= 1834 in music =

This article is about music-related events in 1834.

== Events ==
- September – Viennese ballerina Fanny Elssler makes her debut with the Ballet du Théâtre de l'Académie Royale de Musique at the Paris Opera's Salle Le Peletier.
- October 7 – Birmingham Town Hall in Birmingham, England, designed by Joseph Hansom and Edward Welch, is opened for the Birmingham Triennial Music Festival.
- December 21 – "Kde domov můj" (Where My Home Is), with music by František Škroup and words by Josef Kajetán Tyl, which will become the national anthem of the Czech Republic, originates as a part of the incidental music to the comedy Fidlovačka aneb Žádný hněv a žádná rvačka (Fidlovačka, or No Anger and No Brawl), first performed by Karel Strakatý at the Estates Theatre in Prague, at this time subject to the Habsburg monarchy.
- Mikhail Glinka returns to Russia after several years away with the intention of composing Russian nationalist music.

== Publications ==
- Pierre Baillot – L'art du violon
- J.C. Maugin – Manuel du Luthier

== Popular music ==
- "Alphabet song" (copyrighted by C. Bradlee)

== Classical music ==
- Charles-Valentin Alkan – Variations sur un thème de Bellini, Op.16 No.5
- William Sterndale Bennett – Piano Concerto in C Minor
- Hector Berlioz – Harold in Italy
- Ole Bull
  - Violin Concerto No.1, Op.4
  - Quartet for Solo Violin
- Norbert Burgmuller
  - Rhapsodie in B minor for Piano, Op.13
  - Duo for Piano and Clarinet, Op.15
- Luigi Cherubini – String Quartet No. 3 in D minor
- Frederic Chopin – Fantaisie-Impromptu (published posthumously in 1855)
- Felicien David
  - Fantasia harabi
  - Égyptienne
  - Vieux Caire
- Heinrich Wilhelm Ernst
  - Nocturnes for Violin and Piano, Op.8
  - Thème allemand varié, Op.9
  - Souvenir du 'Pré aux clercs'
- Johann Nepomuk Hummel – Grand rondeau brillant, Op.126
- Friedrich Kalkbrenner
  - Les Soupirs, Op.121
  - Thême favori de la 'Norma' de Bellini varié, Op.122
- Karol Kurpinski – Polonaise in C major
- Franz Paul Lachner
  - Waldklänge, Op.28
  - Symphony No.3, Op.41
- Luigi Legnani – Grande Fantasia, Op.61
- Franz Liszt – Apparations
- Giacomo Meyerbeer
  - Le moine
  - Rachel à Nephtali
- James Nares – The souls of the righteous
- George Onslow
  - 3 String Quartets, Op.46
  - String Quartet No.22, Op.47
- Ludwig Schunke
  - Caprice No.1, Op.9
  - Rondeau brillant, Op.11
- Louis Spohr – Erinnerung an Marienbad, Op.89
- Mikhail Vysotsky – Fuga of Bach

== Opera ==
- Adolphe Adam – Le Chalet, premiered September 25 in Paris
- Daniel Auber – Lestocq, premiered May 24 in Paris
- John Barnett – The Mountain Sylph
- Gaetano Donizetti – Gemma di Vergy, premiered December 26 in Milan
- Konradin Kreutzer – Das Nachtlager in Granada
- Saverio Mercadante
  - Emma d'Antiochia, premiered March 8 in Venice
  - Uggiero il danese

== Births ==
- January 1 – Ludovic Halévy, librettist (died 1908)
- January 14 – William C. F. Robinson, colonial administrator (d. 1897)
- January 20 – Théodore Salomé, composer (died 1896)
- January 23 – Josef Löw, composer (died 1886)
- January 28 – Sabine Baring-Gould, clergyman, hymn-writer, song collector, writer and scholar (d. 1834)
- February 28 – Sir Charles Santley, baritone (d. 1922)
- March 1 – Hildegard Werner, conductor (d. 1911)
- March 23 – Julius Reubke, pianist, organist and composer (d. 1858)
- March 31 – Amalie Wickenhauser-Neruda, pianist (died 1890)
- April 1 – Isidore-Edouard Legouix, composer (died 1916)
- April 6 – Hart Pease Danks, musician (died 1903)
- May 19 – Carl Müllerhartung, composer (died 1908)
- June 8 – George Garrett, composer (d. 1897)
- June 22 – Frédéric Louis Ritter, composer (died 1891)
- June 24 – George Becker, composer and music writer (d. 1928)
- August 9 – Elias Álvares Lobo, composer (d. 1901)
- August 14 – Alexander Winterberger, composer (died 1914)
- August 17 – Peter Benoit, composer (d. 1901)
- August 31 – Amilcare Ponchielli, composer (d. 1886)
- October 3 – Vilém Blodek, composer (died 1874)
- October 4 – Helen Lemmens-Sherrington, opera singer (died 1906)
- October 17 – Josephine Pollard, hymnist (died 1892)
- October 31 – Knowles Shaw, composer of gospel hymns (d. 1878)
- November 2 – Harriet McEwen Kimball, hymnist (died 1917)
- November 7 – Ernest Gagnon, composer (died 1915)
- November 29 – Sedley Taylor, music theorist (died 1920)
- November 30 – Joseph Mosenthal, musician (died 1896)
- December 12 – Wilhelmine Clauss-Szarvady, pianist (died 1907)
- December 22 – Herman Amberg, composer (died 1902)
- date unknown
  - David Braham, composer (died 1905)
  - Harry McCarthy, songwriter (died 1888)

== Deaths ==
- January 29 – Johann Gaudenz von Salis-Seewis, librettist (born 1762)
- February 4 – Amélie-Julie Candeille, singer, librettist and composer (b. 1767)
- April 17 – Catherine Maria Fanshawe, lyricist (born 1765)
- June 29 – Alexandre-Étienne Choron, musicologist (born 1771)
- September 2 – David Charles, hymn-writer (b. 1762)
- August 8 – Silvestro Palma, Italian composer (b. 1754)
- October 8 – François-Adrien Boïeldieu, composer (b. 1775)
- December 7 – Ludwig Schuncke, composer (b. 1810)
- date unknown
  - Antoine-Laurent Baudron, violinist and composer (b. 1742)
  - August Duranowski, violinist and composer (b. c. 1770)
  - Filip Višnjić, gusle player (b. 1767)
