= My Home (Dvořák) =

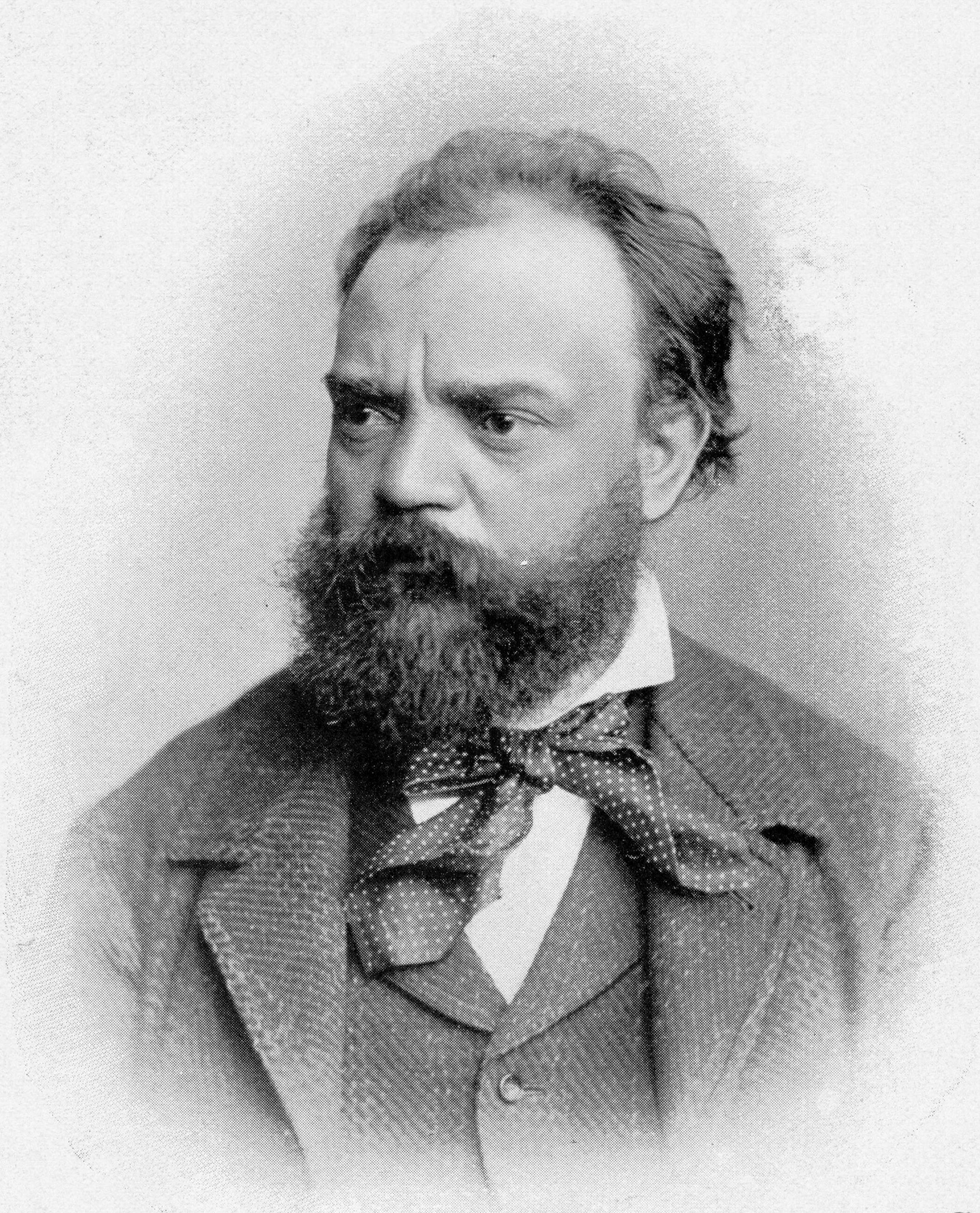
Antonín Dvořák in 1882

My Home (Czech: Můj domov, předehra ke hře F. F. Šamberka), Op. 62, B. 125a, is an overture in C major by Czech composer Antonín Dvořák. He wrote this symphonic poem between December 1881 and January 23 of the next year as one of nine numbers comprising incidental music for the play Josef Kajetán Tyl by František Ferdinand Šamberk, but it is usually performed alone as a concert work of about ten minutes.

The score’s sonata form develops two song-themes associated with the drama’s titular protagonist, himself a Czech playwright: Kde domov můj by František Škroup and the folktune Na tom našem dvoře. Škroup composed Kde domov můj (Where my home is) in 1834 to a text by Tyl; it soon became popular and eventually became the Czech national anthem. Na tom našem dvoře was customarily sung in productions of Strakonický dudák (The Bagpiper of Strakonice), one of Tyl's most popular plays.

== Partial discography ==
- Karel Ančerl conducting the Czech Philharmonic, Supraphon SU 11 1998 (1962)
- István Kertész cond. London Symphony Orchestra, Decca SXL 6273 (Kingsway Hall, Dec. 8-10, 1965)
- Witold Rowicki cond. London Symphony Orchestra, Decca 4782296 (1970)
- Rafael Kubelík cond. Symphonie-Orchester des Bayerischen Rundfunks, Deutsche Grammophon 469366 (rec. 1975)
- Václav Neumann cond. Czech Philharmonic, Supraphon SU 3818-2 (rec. 1982)
- André Previn cond. Los Angeles Philharmonic, Telarc 80173 (1988)
- Neeme Järvi cond. Royal Scottish National Orchestra (1986–1987), Chandos 241-3 (1989)
- Bohumil Gregor cond. Czech Philharmonic (1987), Supraphon SU 11 0378-2 (1990)
- Libor Pešek cond. Czech Philharmonic, Virgin Classics 45127 (1995)
- Otmar Suitner cond. Staatskapelle Berlin, Berlin Classics 93112 (1996)
- Theodore Kuchar cond. Janáček Philharmonic Orchestra, Brilliant Classics 92297 (2004)
