= Juliane Junghans =

Czech stage actress

Juliane Junghans (1773–1819) was a Bohemian stage actress and soprano singer.

She was engaged at the Estates Theatre in Prague in 1811–1819, where she performed mother roles in comedies and soprano parts in operettas.

She was the mother of the actors Karl Heinrich Junghans (1804–1831), Julie Junghans and Marie Junghans.
