= Wilhelmine Ullmayer =

Czech stage actress

Wilhelmine Ullmayer (1846-1890) was a stage actor. She was engaged at the Estates Theatre in Prague in 1874–1890, where she belonged to the theatre's star attractions. She was known for her roles a soubrette and operetta singer.
