= Blatná =

Town in South Bohemian Region, Czech Republic

- Town
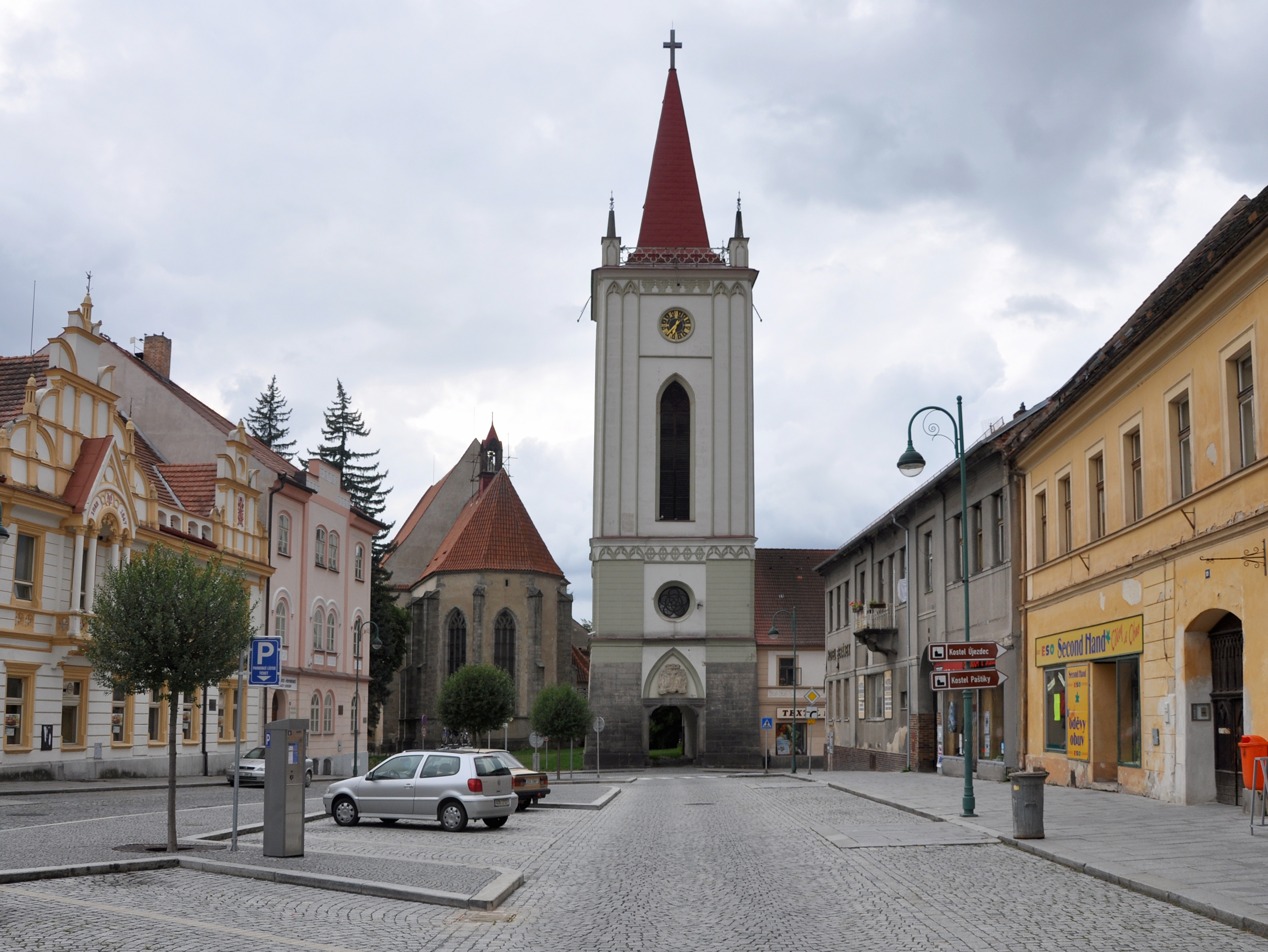
- Town Square with the Church of the Assumption of the Virgin Mary and the bell tower

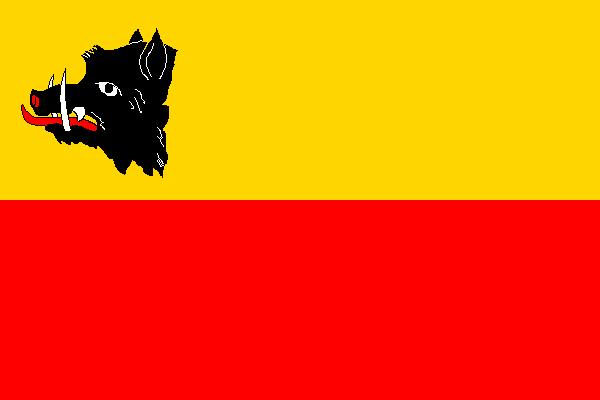
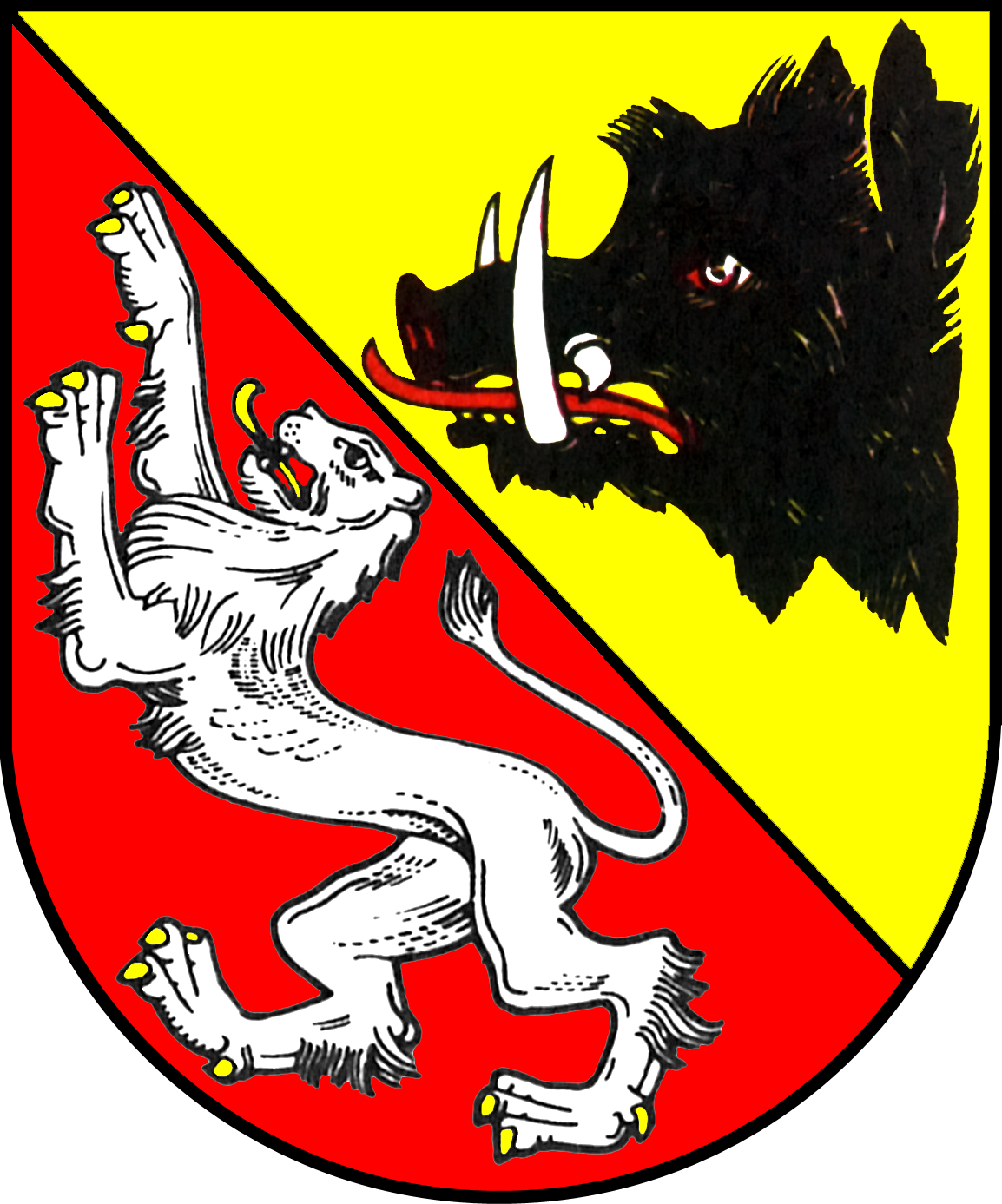
- Flag Coat of arms

- Location of Blatná in the Czech Republic
- Coordinates: 49°25′29″N 13°52′55″E
- Country: Czech Republic
- Region: South Bohemian
- District: Strakonice
- First mentioned: 1235

Government
  - Mayor: Robert Flandera

Area
  - Total: 43.60 km^{2} (16.83 sq mi)
- Elevation: 440 m (1,440 ft)

Population (2026-01-01)
  - Total: 6,679
  - Density: 153.2/km^{2} (396.8/sq mi)
- Time zone: UTC+1 (CET)
  - Summer (DST): UTC+2 (CEST)
- Postal code: 388 01
- Website: www.mesto-blatna.cz

Blatná (Czech pronunciation: [ˈblatnaː]; German: Blatna) is a town in Strakonice District in the South Bohemian Region of the Czech Republic. It has about 6,700 inhabitants. The town is located on the Lomnice River in the Blatná Uplands.

Blatná is known for Blatná Castle, a water castle with a surrounding moat, and a landscape garden around it. The historic town centre with the castle complex is well preserved and is protected as an urban monument zone.

== Administrative division ==
Blatná consists of nine municipal parts (in brackets population according to the 2021 census):

- Blatná (5,830)
- Blatenka (44)
- Čekanice (80)
- Drahenický Málkov (78)
- Hněvkov (63)
- Jindřichovice (10)
- Milčice (18)
- Řečice (42)
- Skaličany (124)

== Etymology ==
The name Blatná is derived from the Old Czech word blata (meaning 'marshes'). It got its name from the marshlands among which it was founded.

== Geography ==
Blatná is located about 18 kilometres (11 mi) north of Strakonice and 48 km (30 mi) southeast of Plzeň. It lies in the Blatná Uplands. The highest point is at 561 m (1,841 ft) above sea level. The Lomnice River flows through the town. The municipal territory is rich in fishponds, built here since the Middle Ages. The municipality of Mačkov forms an enclave in the territory of Blatná.

=== Climate ===
Blatná enjoys an inland version of temperate Oceanic climate (Cfb) with rather balanced temperatures year round. Precipitations are vastly in form of rain, totalling 691 mm. There are four pronounced seasons with notably cold, dry, and murky winter season, contrasting with much sunnier and wetter warm seasons. Average round the clock temperatures in July stays on +17.2 °C and January mean temperatures stays on −2.5 °C. The whole year average is 7.7 °C (45.9 °F).

Climate data for Blatná
Month	Jan	Feb	Mar	Apr	May	Jun	Jul	Aug	Sep	Oct	Nov	Dec	Year
Mean daily maximum °C (°F)	0.5 (32.9)	2.1 (35.8)	7.6 (45.7)	12.9 (55.2)	18.1 (64.6)	21.1 (70.0)	22.9 (73.2)	22.5 (72.5)	18.6 (65.5)	12.6 (54.7)	5.6 (42.1)	2.0 (35.6)	12.2 (54.0)
Daily mean °C (°F)	−2.5 (27.5)	−1.5 (29.3)	3.0 (37.4)	7.5 (45.5)	12.3 (54.1)	15.5 (59.9)	17.2 (63.0)	16.9 (62.4)	13.3 (55.9)	8.1 (46.6)	2.7 (36.9)	−0.6 (30.9)	7.7 (45.9)
Mean daily minimum °C (°F)	−5.5 (22.1)	−5.0 (23.0)	−1.6 (29.1)	2.1 (35.8)	6.6 (43.9)	10.0 (50.0)	11.6 (52.9)	11.3 (52.3)	8.0 (46.4)	3.6 (38.5)	−0.2 (31.6)	−3.2 (26.2)	3.1 (37.6)
Average precipitation mm (inches)	46 (1.8)	38 (1.5)	43 (1.7)	44 (1.7)	74 (2.9)	81 (3.2)	89 (3.5)	80 (3.1)	58 (2.3)	44 (1.7)	43 (1.7)	51 (2.0)	691 (27.2)
Source: Climate-Data.org

== History ==
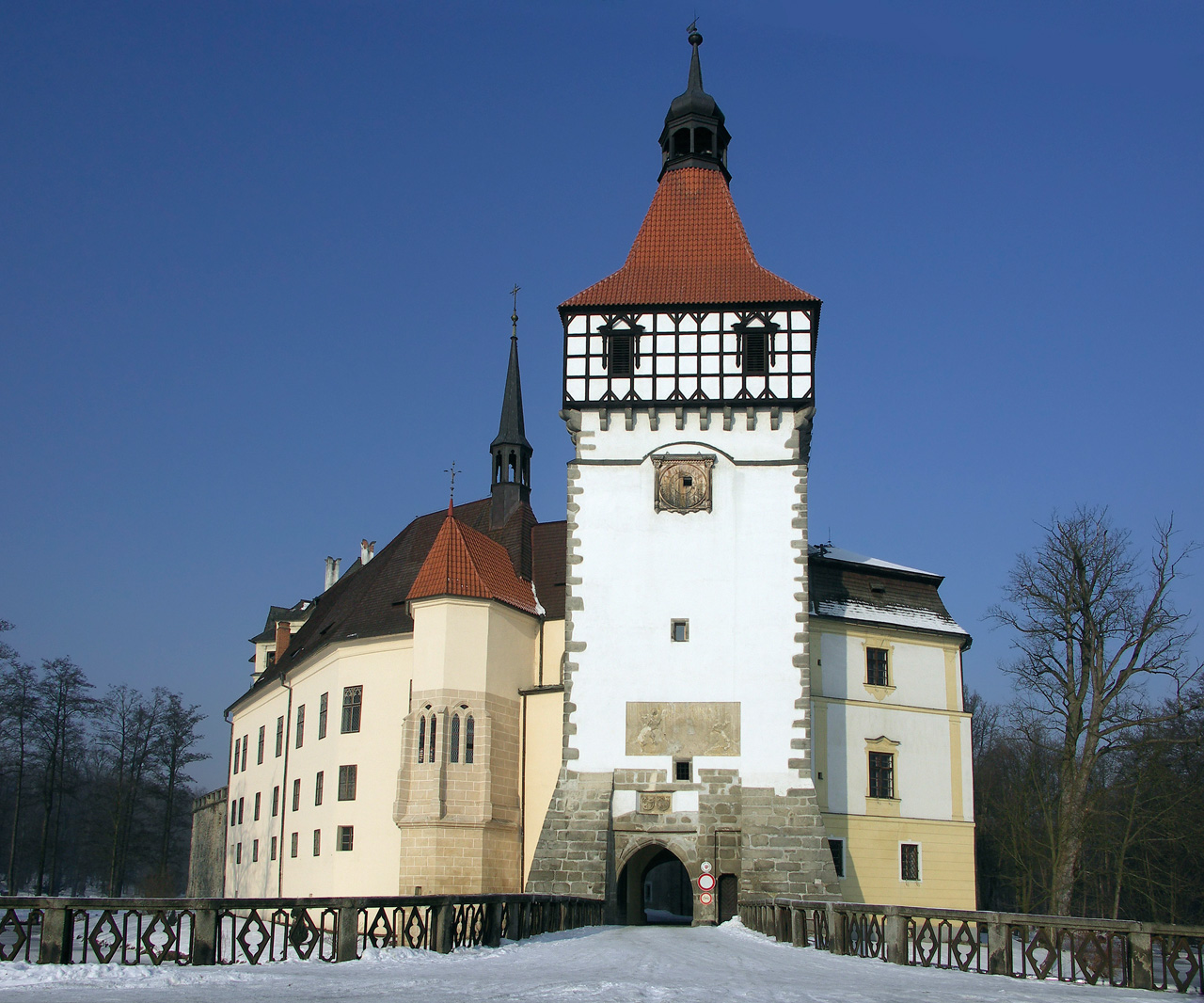
Blatná water castle

The first settlement of the area is documented by archaeological finds up to the 4th century. In the 8th and 9th centuries, a Slavis settlement is documented. The first written mention of Blatná is from 1235, when there probably already existed a fortress with a settlement. In the 14th century, Blatná became a property of the Bavor of Strakonice family, which leads to the development of the settlement.

The importance of Blatná grows especially in the 15th and at the beginning of the 16th century, when Blatná became the centre of the dominion of the family of Lev of Rožmitál. Their long rule marks the golden age of Blatná. At that time, the burghers of Blatná gained the privileges that enabled the development of handicraft production and the growth of the business – the right to organise markets and brew beer. In the second half of the 16th century, Blatná was owned by the Sternberg family for a short time until it was bought by the Polish Counts of Rozdražov. In 1601, Blatná was promoted to a town by Emperor Rudolf II.

During the Thirty Years' War, Blatná was repeatedly looted and destroyed. In 1691, the Kolowrat-Krakowsky family bought Blatná, but they sold it to the Serényi family already in 1695. In the 18th century, during the rule of the Serényis, the town recovered and prospered. Since 1798, Blatná has belonged to the Tyrolean house by origin of Hildprandts of Ottenhausen. They have owned the castle continuously, with the exception of the period of communist dictatorship (1948–1989) when it was confiscated by the state.

The town burned down completely in 1834; 118 houses, the town hall and the bell tower were destroyed and therefore most buildings in the town come from after that event. At that time Blatná fell to one of the poorest towns. In 1858, the town once again recovered and became a district town. The town's economy further developed after the railway to Strakonice and Březnice was built at the end of the 19th century.

== Demographics ==
Historical population

Year	Pop.	±%
1869	4,924	—
1880	5,014	+1.8%
1890	4,891	−2.5%
1900	4,815	−1.6%
1910	4,839	+0.5%

Year	Pop.	±%
1921	4,700	−2.9%
1930	4,476	−4.8%
1950	4,355	−2.7%
1961	4,722	+8.4%
1970	5,265	+11.5%

Year	Pop.	±%
1980	6,208	+17.9%
1991	6,944	+11.9%
2001	6,644	−4.3%
2011	6,705	+0.9%
2021	6,289	−6.2%

Source: Censuses

== Economy ==
The largest employers in Blatná are Dura Automotive CZ (manufacturer of automotive components), Leifheit (household products manufacturer) and Tesla Blatná (manufacture of electronics for cars).

== Transport ==
The I/20 road (part of the European route E49) from Písek to Plzeň runs through the town.

Three railway lines start and terminate in Blatná: to Strakonice, Beroun and Nepomuk.

== Education ==
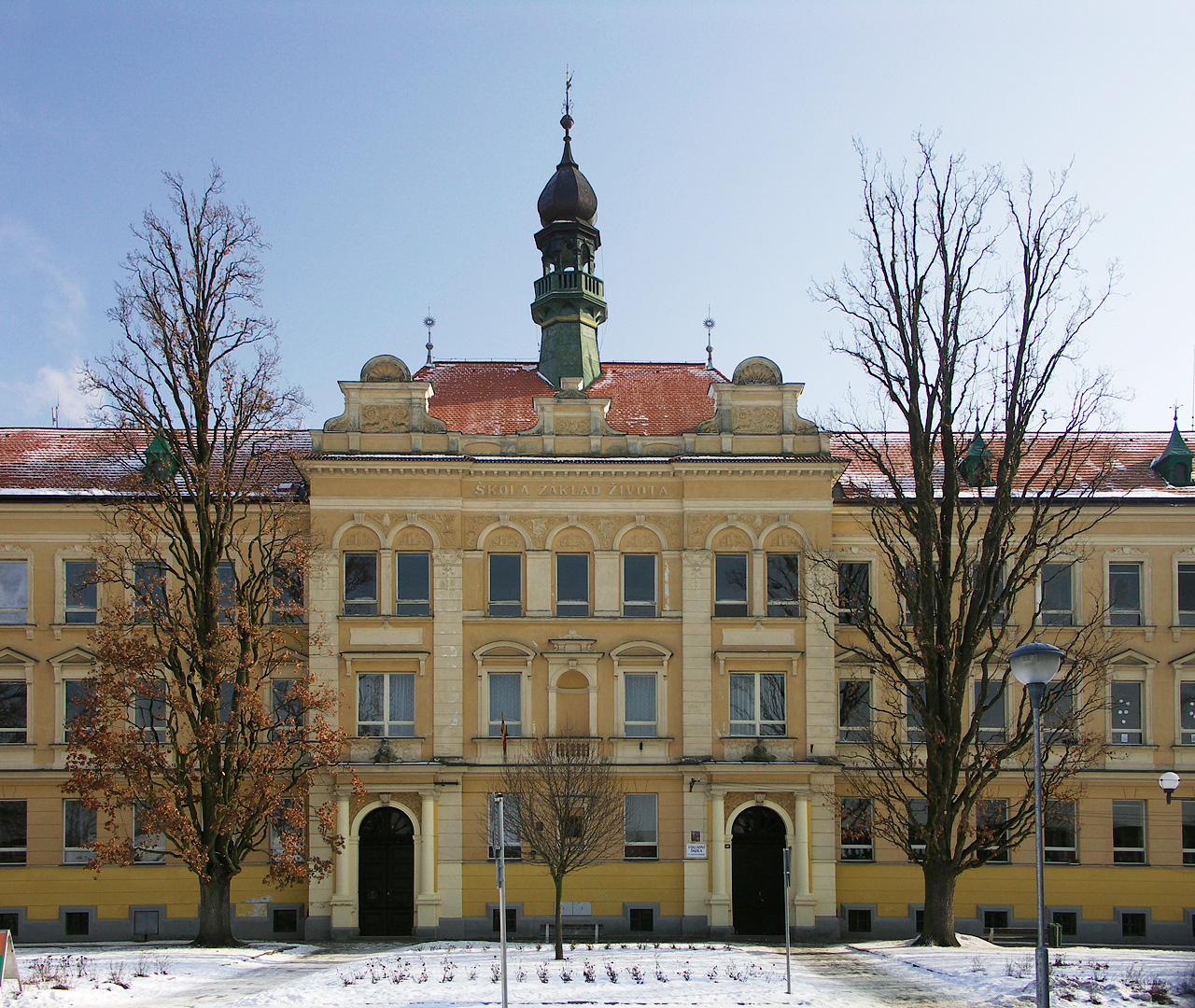
J. A. Komenského School

There are three primary and two secondary schools in town.

== Sights ==
=== Blatná Castle ===
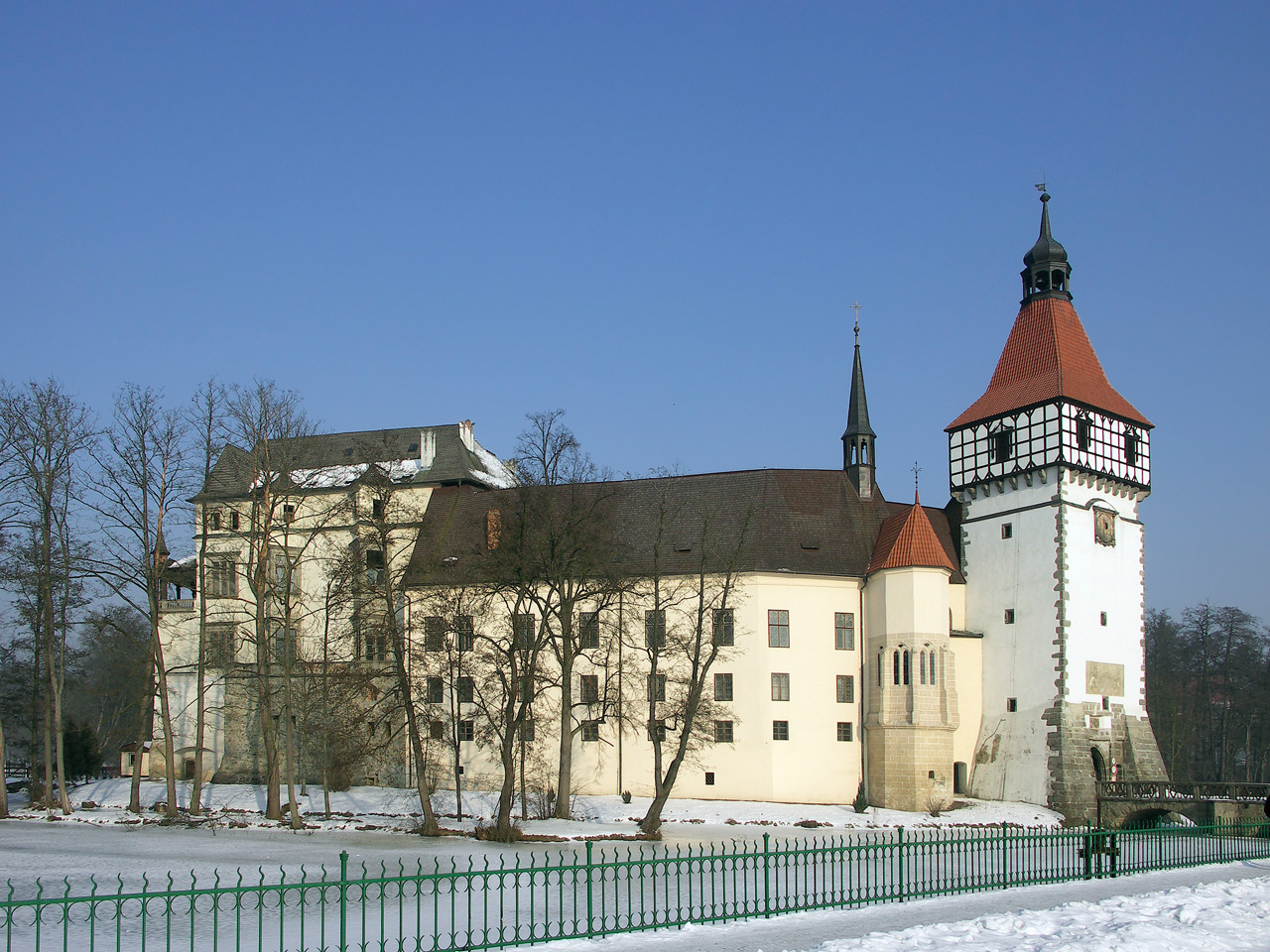
Side view of the castle, from right to left: the tower, Rožmitálský Palace with protruding chapel and Rejt's Palace

Blatná Castle is the town's main landmark. It is built on a rock surrounded by a moat, connected with a pond. The castle is narrow, U-shaped, with a tower in front to which the palaces from various periods attach. The castle is being restored with most of the works finished. It is open for the public, together with the castle park and deer park.

Under the Lev of Rožmitál family, the fortress was for the first time rebuilt in stone (the oldest parts being the tower and Rožmitálský Palace) and the surrounding marshes were changed into wide water trenches. A Gothic chapel was soon attached to the tower and palace. Lords of Rožmitál were continuously rebuilding and enlarging the castle, first with the so-called Old Palace, standing separatedly over the remnants of a Romanesque chapel. In 1523–1530, during the rule of Zdeněk Lev of Rožmitál, a new palace in a mixed Gothic-Renaissance style was appended under the guidance of renowned royal builder Benedikt Rejt and now is called Rejt's Palace.

During the rule of the Counts of Rozdražov, the Renaissance Rozdražovský Palace was built and became the last part of the castle. In the 18th century, the Serényi family had one wing of the castle rebuilt in the Baroque style and also erected many Baroque statues in the town and its surroundings. In 1850–1856, the castle received its last rebuilt, which gave it its contemporary neo-Gothic look.

=== Castle park ===
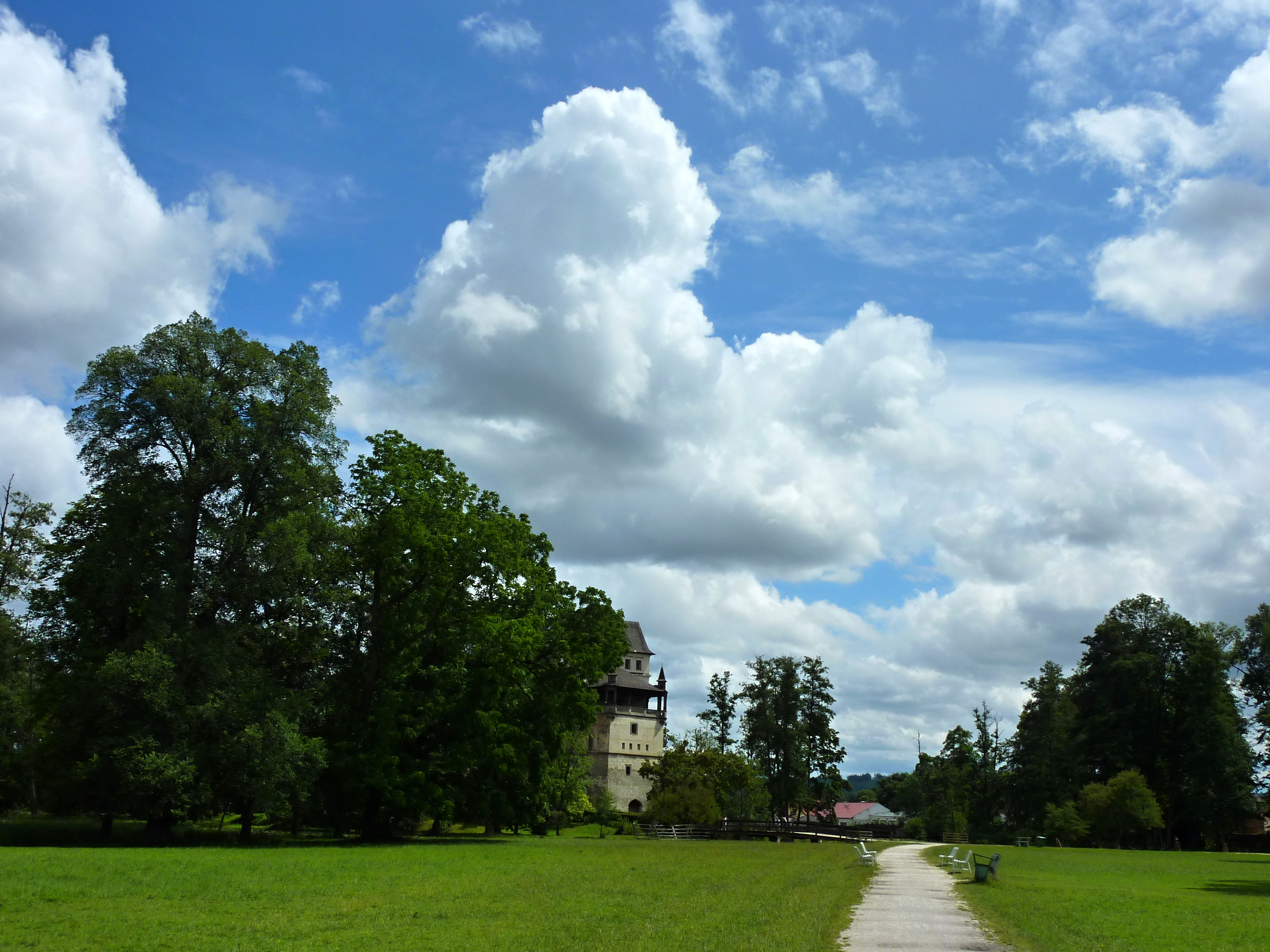
Castle park

The castle park spreads next to the castle on an area of 42 ha (100 acres). The park was created as an English landscape garden at the beginning of the 19th century by František Hildprandt. Its part close to the castle surrounds a large meadow with very old solitary oak trees. Beyond the meadow are preserved old woods with alleys, swamps, streams with footbridges over them, artificial caves, remnants after placer mining and an Empire summer house. Its part is also a deer park. A herd of tame fallow deer freely roams the park.

=== Church of the Assumption of the Virgin Mary ===
The Church of the Assumption of the Virgin Mary lies next to the castle, at the end of the main square. It was founded in the 1290s as a two-aisled building with a long presbytery, and small adytum on the north side. It gained its present looks in 1515 when the reconstruction was finished.

The bell tower is located next to the church. It was first built in 1722–1723 and was 46 m (151 ft) high. It was destroyed with most of the town in the big fire of 1834, but was built again in 1835–1836, this time at 52 metres (171 ft) of height.

=== J. A. Komenského primary school ===
The building of the primary school that carries the name of John Amos Comenius was built according to the design of the local native, architect Karel Fiala, in 1902–1904.

== Notable people ==
- Karel Strakatý (1804–1868), operatic bass, first interpreter of the Czech national anthem
- Kamil Běhounek (1916–1983), accordionist and composer
- Zdenka Fantlová (1922–2022), actor, writer and Holocaust survivor

== Twin towns – sister cities ==
Blatná is twinned with:

- Roggwil, Switzerland
- Sargé-lès-le-Mans, France
- Vacha, Germany
- Važec, Slovakia
