= Friederike Herbst =

Czech actress (1805–1866)

Friederike Herbst (1805-1866) was a stage actress. She was engaged at the Estates Theatre in Prague in 1829-1854, where she belonged to the theatre's star attractions.

She was known for her heroine- and character roles and praised for her ability to improvise and to play the most varied parts.
