= Das Nachtlager in Granada =

Romantic opera by Conradin Kreutzer

- Opera by Conradin Kreutzer
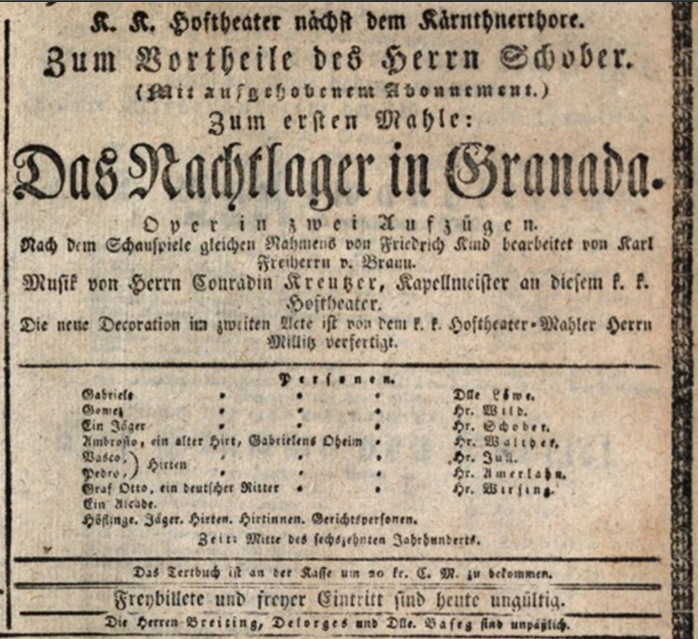
- Playbill of the premiere
- Translation: The Night Camp in Granada
- Librettist: Karl Johann Braun von Braunthal
- Language: German
- Premiere: 13 January 1834; Theater in der Josefstadt, Vienna

Das Nachtlager in Granada (The Night Camp in Granada) is a romantic opera in two acts by Conradin Kreutzer. The libretto is by Karl Johann Braun von Braunthal based on Johann Friedrich Kind's 1818 drama of the same name.

== Performance history ==
The premiere of a first version with spoken dialogue was performed on 13 January 1834 at Theater in der Josefstadt, Vienna. The second version (with recitatives) was performed on 9 March 1837 at Theater am Kärntnertor.

It was subsequently given in London at the former Prince's Theatre on 13 May 1840, and in New York City on 15 December 1862.

== Roles ==
Roles, voice types, premiere cast
Role	Voice type	Premiere cast, 13 January 1834 Conductor: Conradin Kreutzer
Gabriele, Ambrosio's niece	soprano	Anna Segatta
Gomez, a young shepherd	tenor	Josef Emminger
A hunter	baritone	Karl-Josef Pöck
Count Otto, a German nobleman	bass	Brava
Vasco, a shepherd	tenor	Rott
Pedro, a shepherd	bass	Koch
Ambrosio, an old shepherd	bass	Borschitzky
An Alcalde	baritone	Josef Preisinger
Hunters, servants, shepherds and shepherdesses, magistrates

== Synopsis ==
Place: Granada in Spain
Time: middle of the 16th century
