= Zdenka Fantlová =

Czech actor and writer (1922–2022)

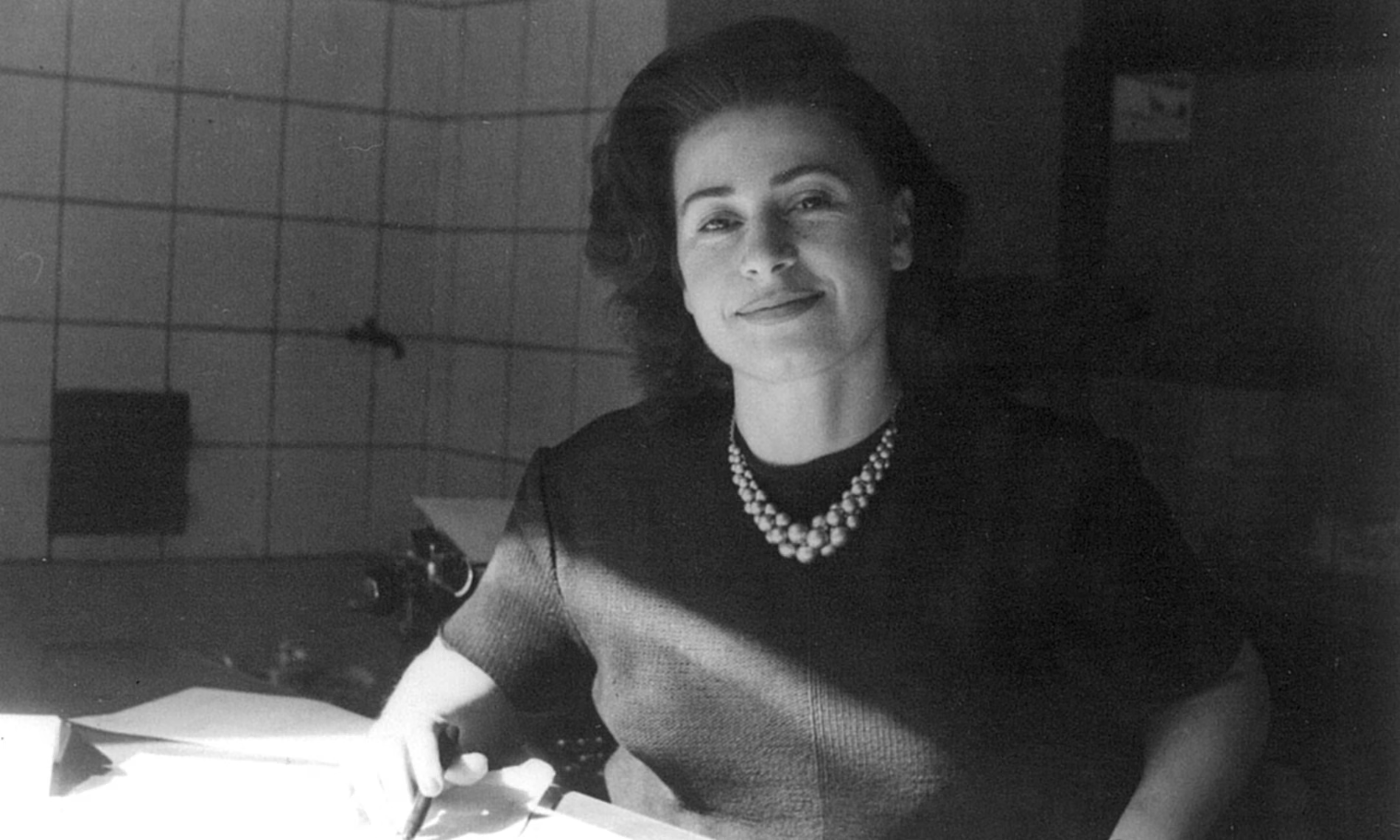
- in 1946
- Born: 28 March 1922; Blatná, Czechoslovakia
- Died: 14 November 2022 (aged 100)

Zdenka Fantlová (28 March 1922 – 14 November 2022) was a Czech actor, writer and Holocaust survivor.

== Biography ==
Fantlová was born in Blatná on 28 March 1922, and grew up in Rokycany in Czechoslovakia. There, she attended grammar school, but due to her Jewish background she was expelled from her studies at the beginning of the Second World War.

Together with her family, like a large part of the Jewish population in Czechoslovakia, Fantlová was deported in January 1942 to the Theresienstadt ghetto, where her boyfriend Arno had also previously been taken. Faced with the prospect of being transported out of Theresienstadt, Arno made a pewter ring with the inscription "Arno 13.6.1942", which he gave to Zdenka as an engagement gift. The next day, Arno was taken away and was never seen again. Under difficult circumstances, Zdenka kept the ring as a memento of her youthful love, and it later became part of the title of her autobiography.

Fantlová participated in organized theatre performances in the ghetto (both Czech and German productions for adults and children), which were permitted by the Nazis as part of a staged demonstration of cultural like in the ghetto for a Red Cross inspection.

The ghetto was closed in autumn 1944 and its inhabitants were transferred to other camps. On 17 October 1944, Fantlová, together with her mother and sister, was deported in cattle cars to Auschwitz-Birkenau, where her mother was murdered shortly after arrival.

Her time in Auschwitz-Birkenau is commemorated by a suitcase bearing her name displayed in a glass case. Fantlová and her sister Lydia were then transferred to different camps; Gross-Rosen in Germany, Mauthausen in Austria, and finally Bergen-Belsen in Germany, where her sister Lydia died during a typhus epidemic. Fantlová survived the camps.

On 15 April 1945, the camp was liberated by the British Army. After the war, Fantlová lived for some time in Sweden, where she was able to receive urgent care and recovery under the auspices of the Red Cross.

In 1949 Fantlová moved to Australia, where she worked as an actor, and in 1969 she moved to London. For many years, Fantlová visited schools and other organisations to speak about her experiences of Nazi abuse during the Second World War.

Fantlová's autobiography, The Tin Ring, was originally written in Czech and was not translated into other languages until 2010. The book later served as the basis of a one-woman stage show.

Fantlová died in London on 14 November 2022 at the age of 100. A memorial plaque bearing her name is installed on the house in Rokycany where she lived.

== Bibliography ==
- Klid je síla, řek̕ tatínek. Primus. 1996. ISBN 80-85625-71-7. OCLC 36752461
- My lucky star. New York: Herodias. 2001. Libris 6938579. ISBN 1-928746-20-9
- Fantlová, Zdenka; Viney, Deryck (2012). The Tin Ring: how I cheated death. Alnwick, Northumberland: McNidder & Grace. Libris 16015278. ISBN 9780857160447
- Haggith, Toby; Newman, Joanna, eds. (2005). Holocaust and the moving image: representations in film and television since 1933. Includes a contribution by Zdenka Fantlová. London: Wallflower Press. Libris 9805801. ISBN 1-904764-52-5
