= Leifheit =

German manufacturing company

Leifheit AG
- Type: Aktiengesellschaft
- Industry: Manufacturing
- Founded: 1959
- Headquarters: Nassau, Rhineland-Palatinate, Germany
- Key people: Alexander Reindler (CEO, Chairman of the Management Board); Igor Iraeta Munduate (COO); Marco Keul (CFO); Günter Blaschke (Chairman of the Supervisory Board)
- Products: household products
- Revenue: €259.2 million (2024)
- Operating income: €12.1 million (2024)
- Net income: 10,000,000 euro
- Total assets: €205 million (2024)
- Number of employees: 993 (2024)

Leifheit AG is a German manufacturer of household products for cleaning, laundry, and kitchen use, headquartered in Nassau. The shares of Leifheit AG have been listed on the Frankfurt Stock Exchange in the Prime Standard segment since 1984.

== History ==
=== 1959 to 1974: Founding and the Leifheit couple's era ===
The company was founded in 1959 by Günter Leifheit (13 December 1920 – 2 July 2009) and his wife Ingeborg, as Günter Leifheit KG. In 1960, production of carpet sweepers based on designs by Hans Erich Slany began. By producing around two million carpet sweepers annually, the company became the leading supplier of this product in Europe in 1970.

In 1972, Leifheit was acquired by the New York-based ITT Corporation. Two years later, the founding couple withdrew from the management of the company. Later, in 2006, Günter Leifheit received the Order of Merit of Rhineland-Palatinate.

=== 1974 to 2020: Various Acquisitions and Internationalization ===
After opening branches in various European countries including France, Switzerland and Italy, Deutsche Bank, which had by then become its owner, took the company public in 1984. Since then, the company has been listed on the Deutsche Börse.

In 1988, with the acquisition of Swiss company Spirella AG, Leifheit entered the bathroom sector, which was expanded in 1989 through the acquisition of the bath textiles factory BTF in Bremen (brand "Kleine Wolke") and in 1993 through companies acquired from Gold-Zack Werke AG, including Semer in Düren as well as the bathroom business of Nitex GmbH in Wedemark.

In 1995, another plant was established in Blatná (Czech Republic). This was followed by acquisitions of FRZ-Metallwarenfabrik Ruschitzka GmbH & Co. KG (Zuzenhausen near Heidelberg) and Meusch group. At the beginning of 2001, Leifheit AG increased its stake in Birambeau, a French company based in Paris with production in Chablis, to a majority holding. Also since 2001, the brand Soehnle (scales and wellbeing products), originally based in Murrhardt, has been part of the Leifheit Group. In 2008, the leading French manufacturer of laundry dryers, Herby, was acquired.

In 2010, the bathroom division (Kleine Wolke, Meusch, and Spirella) was sold to the company Possehl. In 2015, the Schuler-Voith family sold its shares in the company, after which the company's free float increased significantly. The 2010s saw growth in Eastern European markets.

=== Since 2020: Recent Past ===
In 2020, Leifheit launched an advertising campaign featuring television commercials in 16 countries. This initiative, along with the COVID-19 pandemic, during which many people focused more on household activities, was cited by Wirtschaftswoche as a reason for the company's strong growth that year.

In the fiscal year 2024, the revenue increased slightly, while Leifheit's profitability rose significantly. Earnings before interest and taxes doubled from €6.0 million in 2023 to €12.1 million.

== Structure ==
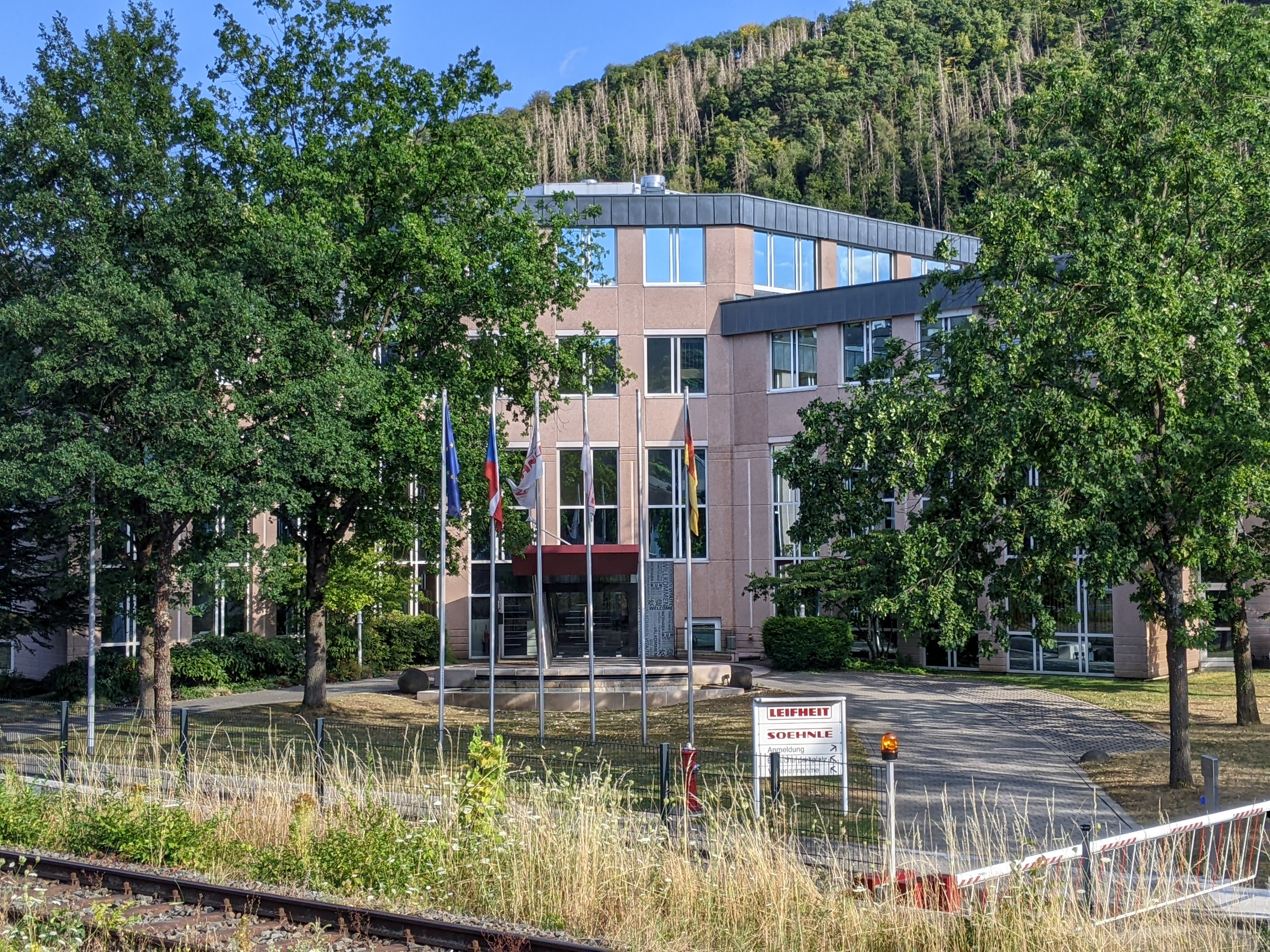
Headquarters in Nassau

Leifheit, based in Nassau, Rhineland-Palatinate, is a publicly listed Aktiengesellschaft. The company supplies to over 80 countries and has 14 branches or locations, operating primarily in the European market (as of 2025). Leifheit operates its own production and logistics facilities in Germany, France, and the Czech Republic.

In 2024, Leifheit generated 62.3% of its turnover outside of Germany, turnover reached €259.2 million and earnings (EBIT) doubled to €12.1 million. In the third quarter of 2024, the e-commerce segment accounted for 23% of the company's sales, with an upward trend.

Leifheit AG has been listed on the Frankfurt Stock Exchange since 1984, and the company's ISIN is DE0006464506. From September 2016, Leifheit was temporarily listed on the SDAX. As of 2020, the company's equity ratio has been around 45% for years. In 2025, Thomas Schumm of Focus Money described Leifheit as a "reliable dividend payer", citing a "payout ratio of 75% of free cash flow" in recent years.

=== Shareholder Structure ===
As of July 2025:

- 10.03%: MKV Verwaltungs GmbH, Grünwald near Munich (Manuel Knapp-Voith)
- 8.26%: Ruthild Loh
- 8.71%: Leifheit AG, Nassau
- 0.05%: Employee shares with lock-in period
- 72.68%: Free float

== Products ==
Leifheit manufactures and sells household products. Leifheit as a brand for household goods is divided into three categories:

- The "Clean Home" segment includes, among others, mechanical cleaning devices for floor and window cleaning, window vacuums and reusable mop covers.
- The "Fresh Laundry" segment includes products for drying and ironing, such as rotary dryers, wall dryers, standing dryers, tower dryers, ironing boards, and ironing accessories.
- The "Smart Kitchen" segment comprises kitchen products such as cutting sets, graters, slicers and mashers, insulated jugs, vacuum sealers, and baking, salad, and grill utensils.

The company’s brands also include:

- Soehnle (household and personal scales, Soehnle app)
- Birambeau (kitchen utensils), French supplier of private-label products
- Herby (laundry dryers), French supplier of private-label products

== Commitment and sustainability ==
In 2022, Leifheit conducted a campaign in cooperation with the Unternehmen Wald foundation, in which one tree was planted for every unit sold of selected promotional products. In 2023, Leifheit and its apprentices participated in the reforestation of the Nassau city forest, planting 4,000 trees. The trees planted are intended to be more resilient to climate change.
