= Drahenický Málkov =

- Village
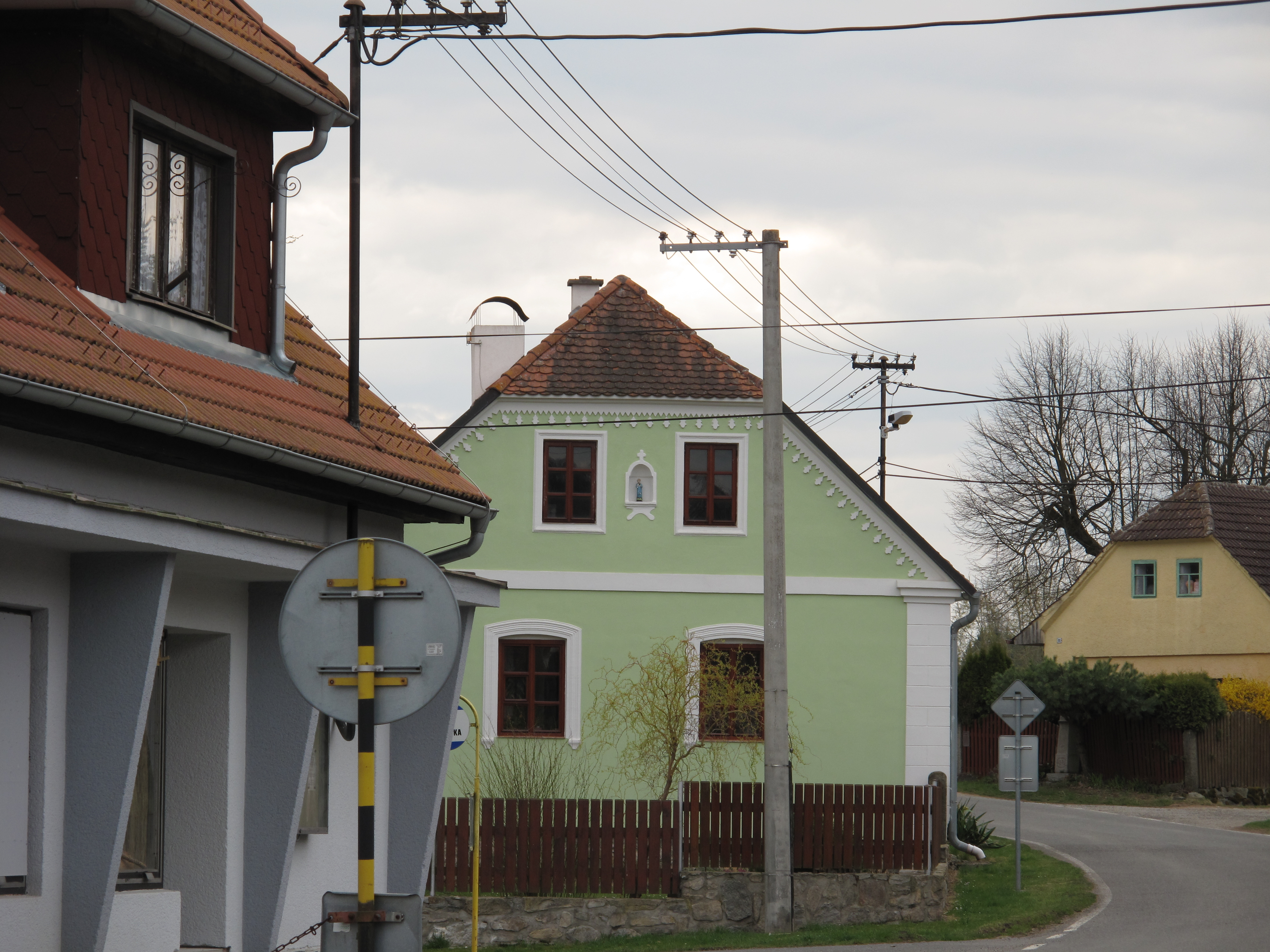
- Houses by the main road
- Interactive map of Drahenický Málkov
- Coordinates: 49.4725°N 13.9008333°E
- Country: Czech Republic
- Region: South Bohemian
- District: Strakonice

Area
  - Total: 4.67 km^{2} (1.80 sq mi)
- Postal code: 388 01
- Website: Drahenický Málkov on the Blatná website(in Czech)

Drahenický Málkov is a village in the district of Strakonice, in the South Bohemian Region, the Czech Republic. It is located about 5.5 km north of the town of Blatná. There are 68 addresses registered in the village. As of 2011, the village had a population of 78.

== History ==
The first written mention of the village dates back to 1454.

== Gallery ==
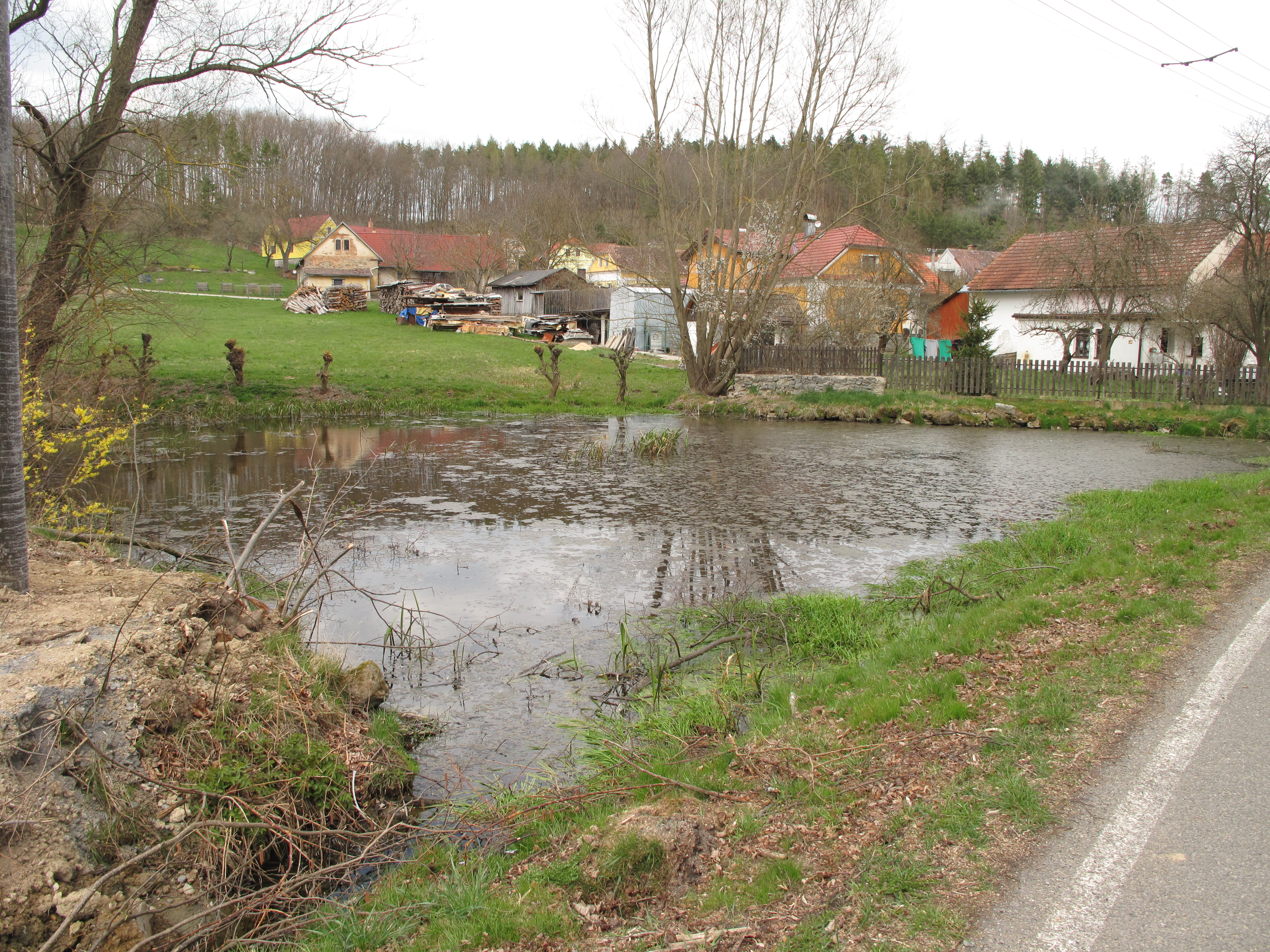
A pond in the part called Chaloupky

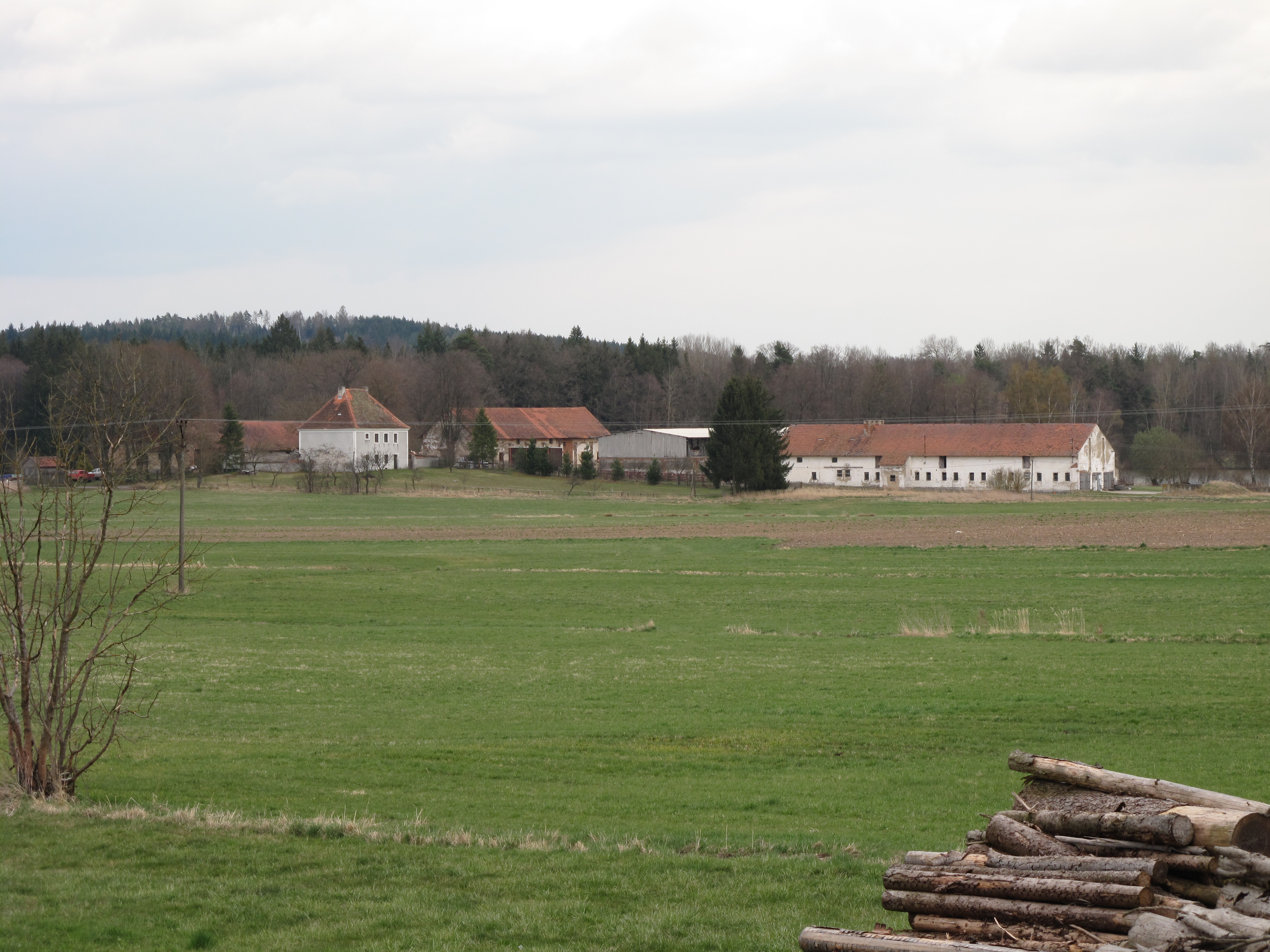
Hamlet called Nový Dvůr from the distance

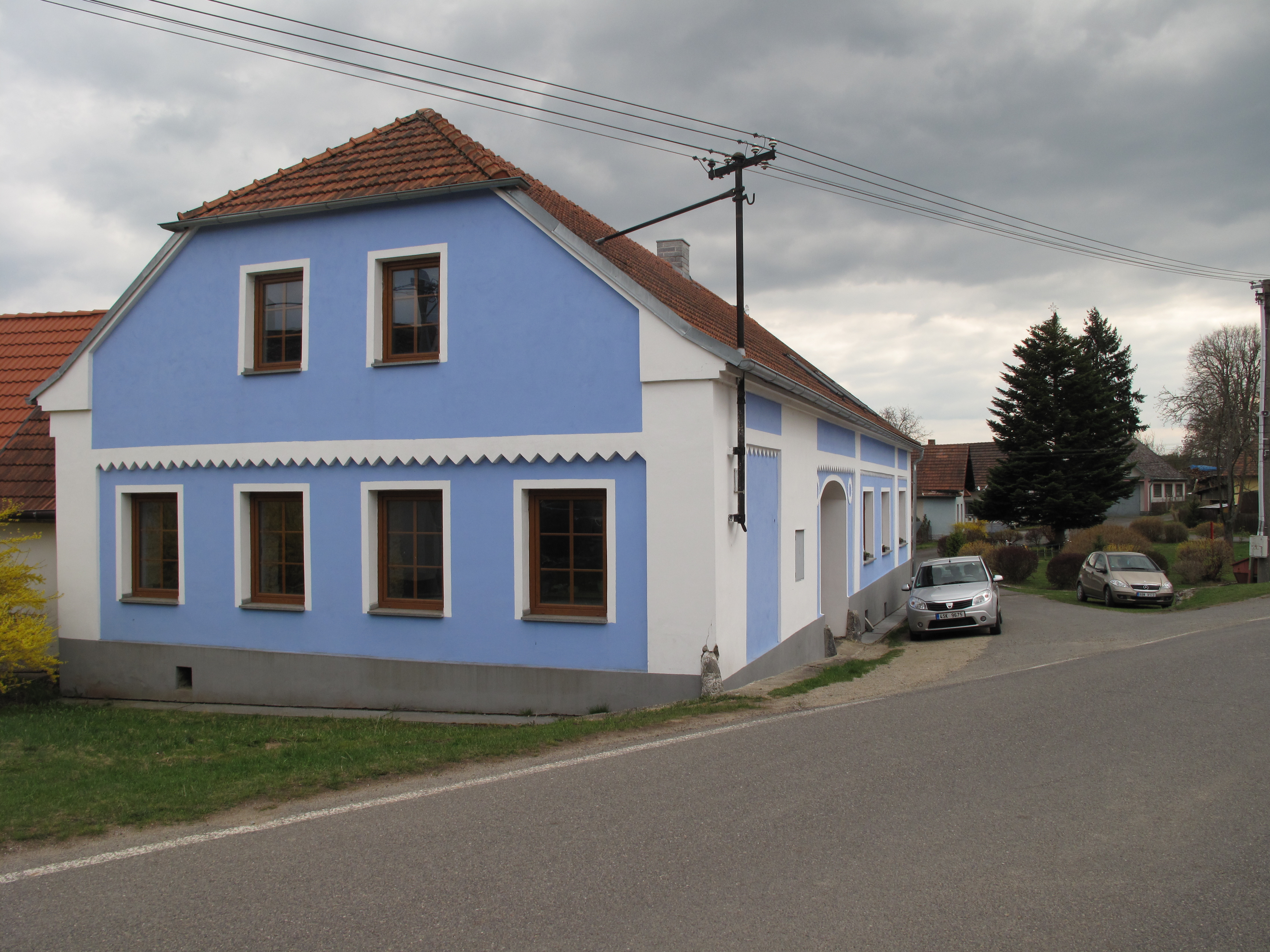
Old house by the road

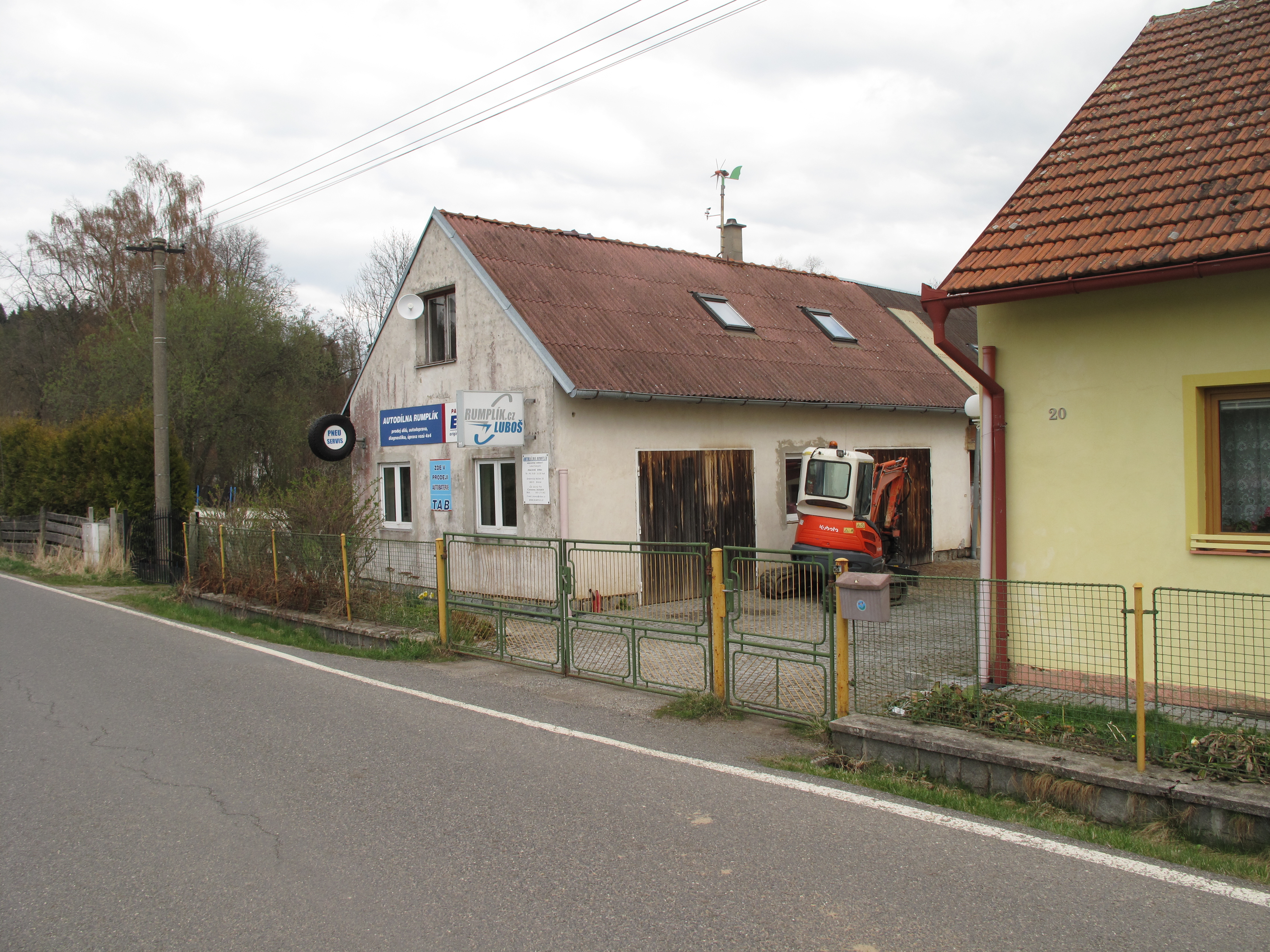
Car service
