= Mačkov =

- Municipality
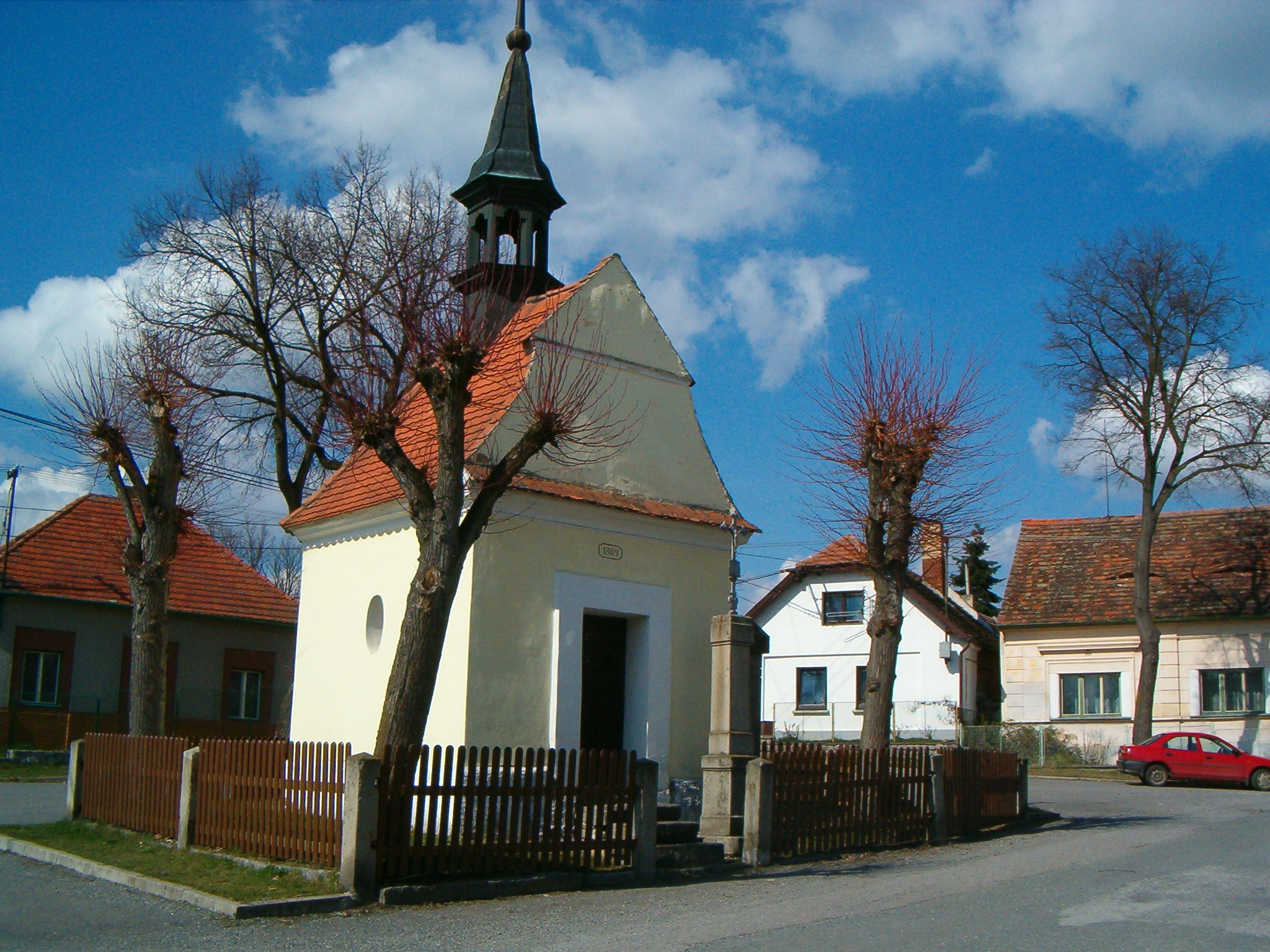
- Chapel of Saint John of Nepomuk

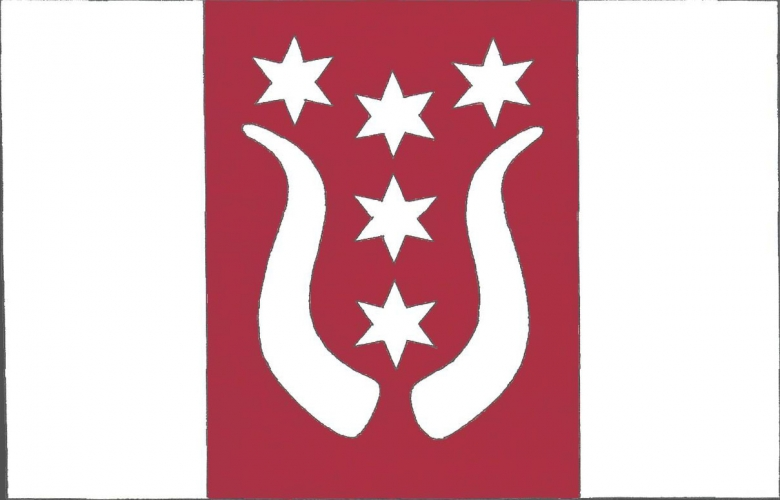
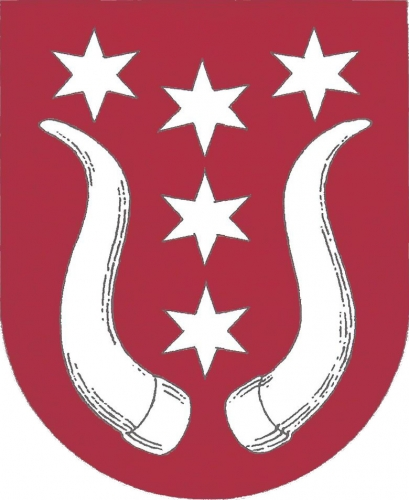
- Flag Coat of arms

- Location in the Czech Republic
- Coordinates: 49°24′16″N 13°53′10″E
- Country: Czech Republic
- Region: South Bohemian
- District: Strakonice
- First mentioned: 1315

Area
  - Total: 5.08 km^{2} (1.96 sq mi)
- Elevation: 454 m (1,490 ft)

Population (2026-01-01)
  - Total: 299
  - Density: 58.9/km^{2} (152/sq mi)
- Time zone: UTC+1 (CET)
  - Summer (DST): UTC+2 (CEST)
- Postal code: 388 01
- Website: www.mackov.cz

Mačkov is a municipality and village in Strakonice District in the South Bohemian Region of the Czech Republic. It has about 300 inhabitants.

== Geography ==
Mačkov is located about 16 kilometres (10 mi) north of Strakonice and 49 km (30 mi) southeast of Plzeň. It lies in the Blatná Uplands. The municipality forms an enclave in the territory of Blatná.

== Demographics ==
Historical population
Year	Pop.	±%
1869	280	—
1880	352	+25.7%
1890	330	−6.2%
1900	310	−6.1%
1910	300	−3.2%
1921	327	+9.0%
1930	312	−4.6%
1950	239	−23.4%
1961	229	−4.2%
1970	205	−10.5%
1980	246	+20.0%
1991	186	−24.4%
2001	294	+58.1%
2011	306	+4.1%
2021	320	+4.6%
Source: Censuses
