= Řečice (Blatná) =

- Village
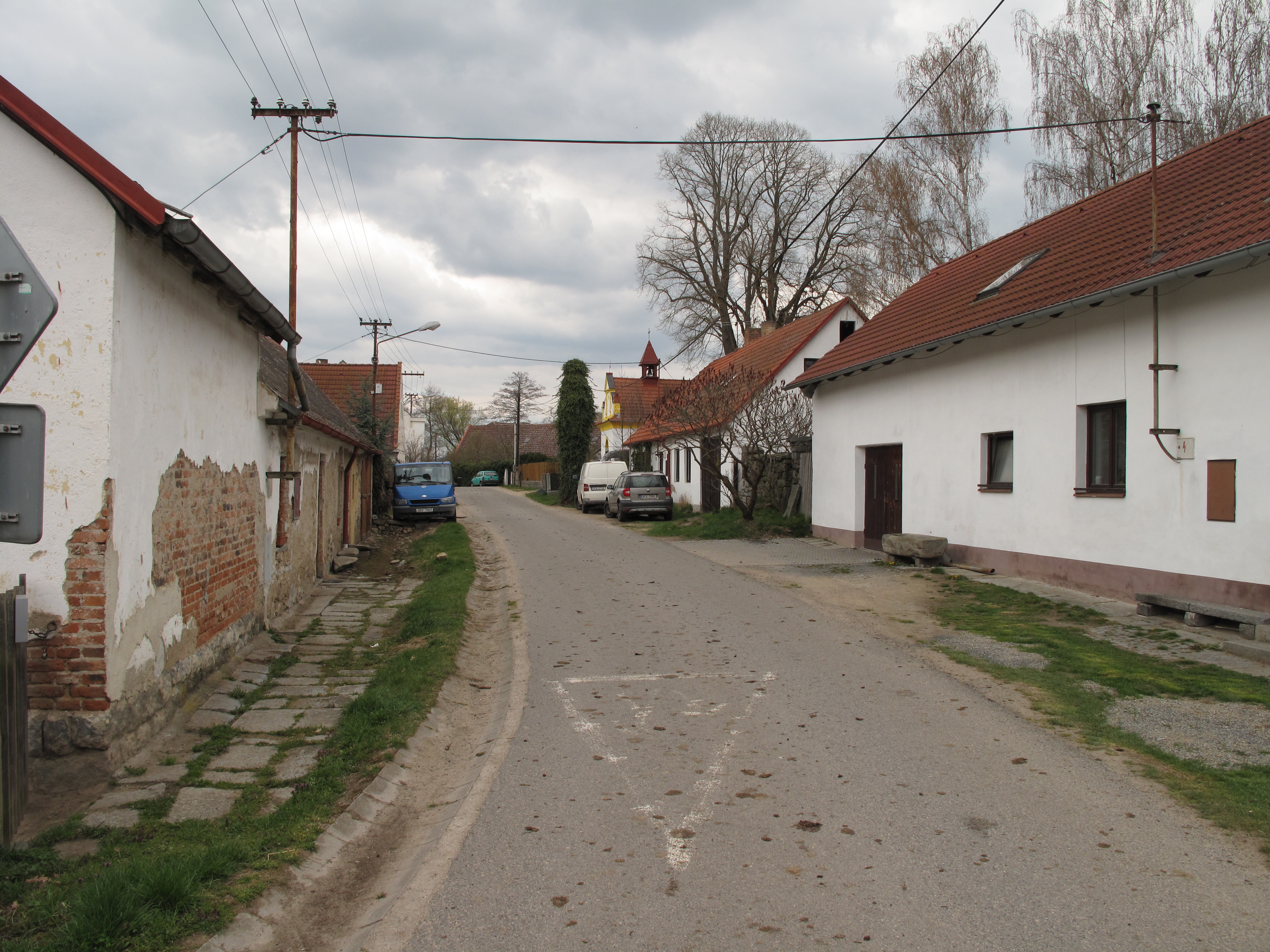
- Road within farms
- Interactive map of Řečice
- Country: Czech Republic
- Region: South Bohemian
- District: Strakonice

Government
  - Mayor: Petra Kuparová

Area
  - Total: 13.62 km^{2} (5.26 sq mi)

Population (2011)
  - Total: 49
  - Density: 3.6/km^{2} (9.3/sq mi)
- Time zone: UTC+1 (CET)
  - Summer (DST): UTC+2 (CEST)
- Postal code: 388 01

Řečice is a village in the district of Strakonice, in the South Bohemian Region, the Czech Republic. It is located approximately 2.5 km northwest of Blatná. There are 22 addresses registered in the village. As of 2011, the village had a population of 49. Petra Kuparová was the chairperson of the settlement committee as of 2022.

There are two ponds nearby the village, Hajanský pond with an area of 18.6 ha and Řečický pond near Malá Řečice. The village is known for the stonecutting tradition of the Blatná region, with both abandoned and functioning quarries mining Blatná-type granodiorite.

== History ==
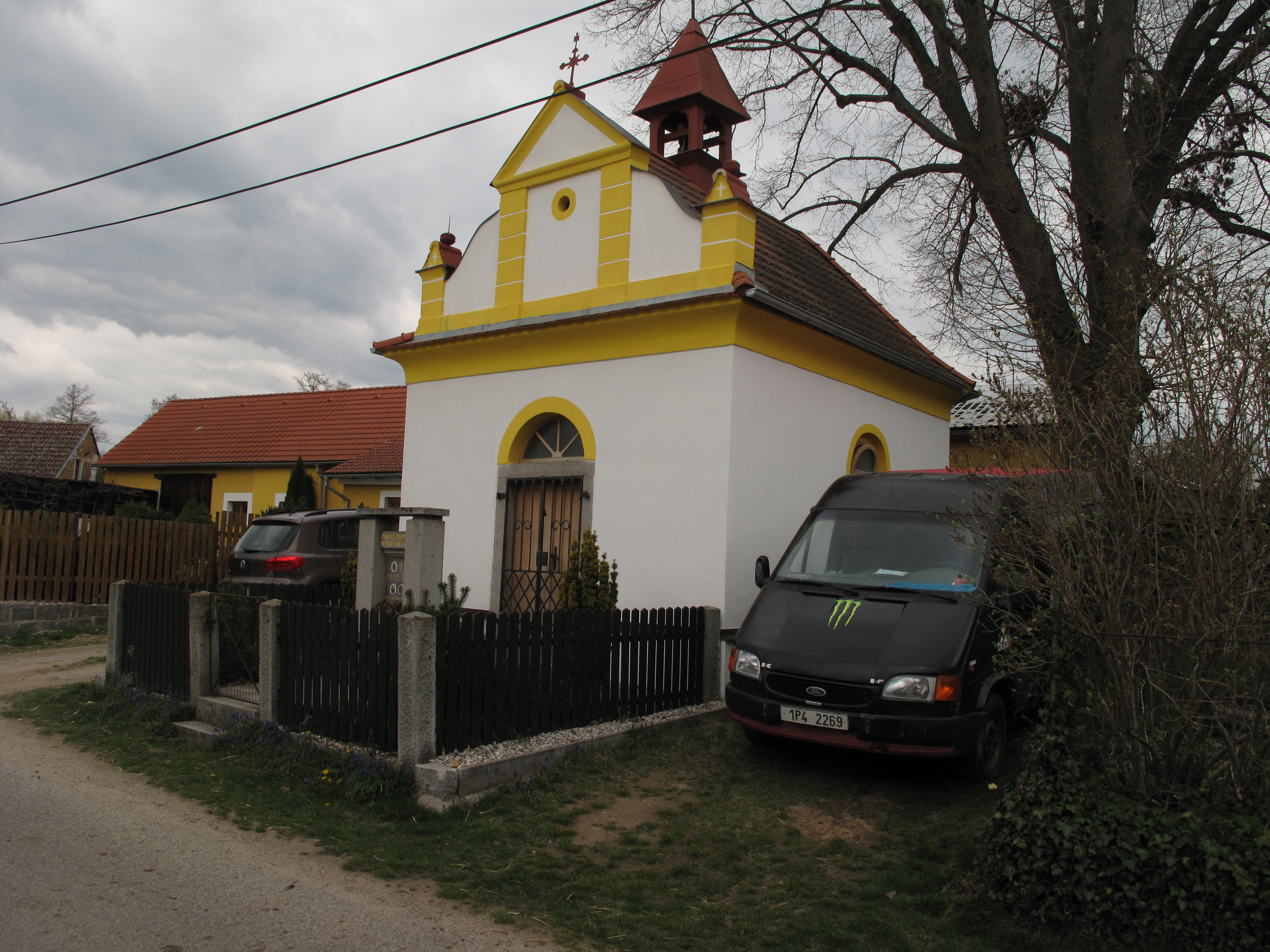
Village chapell

The first written mention of the village dates back to 1772.
