= Kde domov můj =

National anthem of the Czech Republic

English: 'Where My Home Is'
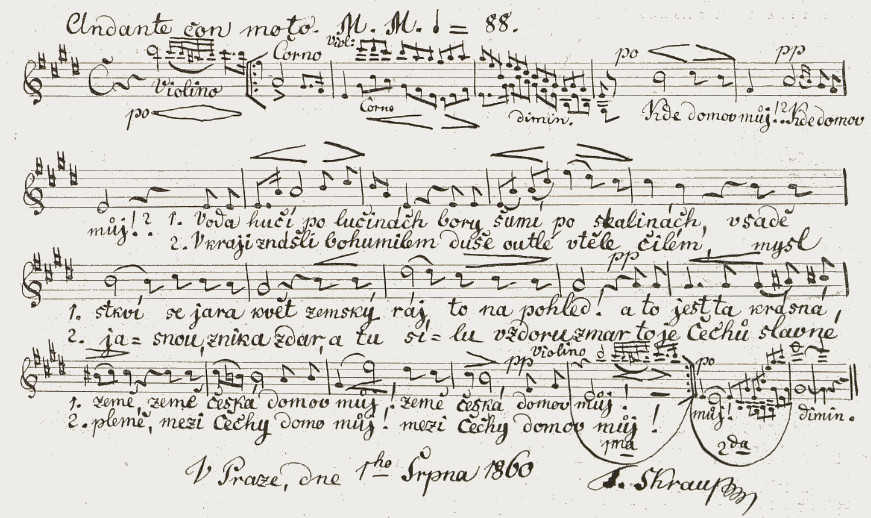
- "Kde domov můj" score written by Škroup in Prague, 1 August 1860
- National anthem of the Czech Republic Former co-national anthem of Czechoslovakia Former regional anthem of the Protectorate of Bohemia and Moravia
- Lyrics: Josef Kajetán Tyl, 1834
- Music: František Škroup, 1834
- Adopted: 1918 (co-national)
- Readopted: 1990 (national)

Audio sample
- 2008 official orchestral and vocal recording by the Choir and Orchestra of the Opera of the Prague National Theatre more recordings below: Instrumentation↓: file; help

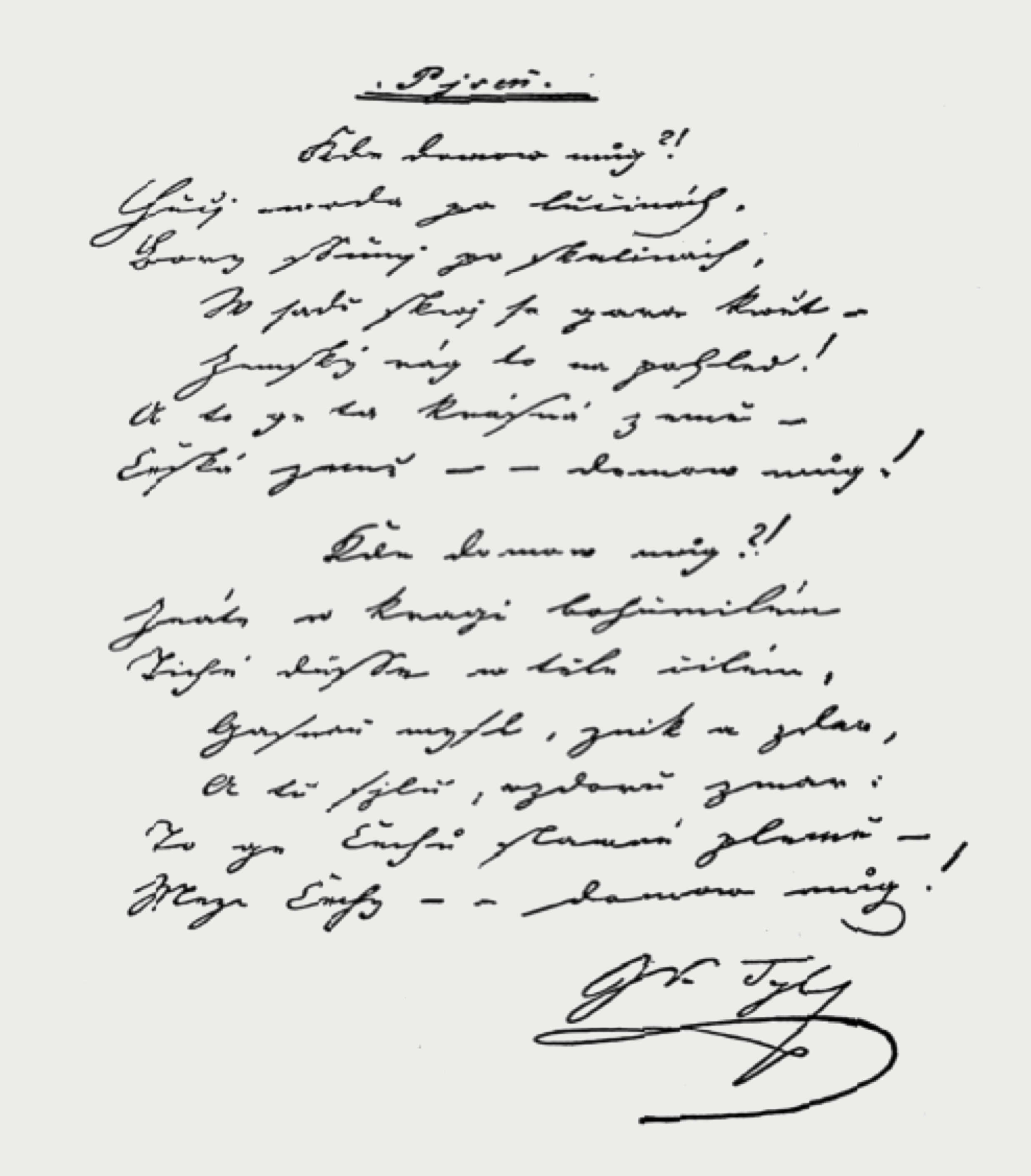
Kde domov můj, text of the song written by Tyl in Prague, 1834

"Kde domov můj" (pronounced [ɡdɛ ˈdomof muːj]) is the national anthem of the Czech Republic. It was composed by František Škroup and written by Josef Kajetán Tyl.

== History ==
=== Origin ===
The piece was written as a part of the incidental music. The piece was one of the twenty-one songs written for comedy Fidlovačka aneb Žádný hněv a žádná rvačka (Fiddlers' Feast, or No Anger and No Brawl). It was first performed by Karel Strakatý at the Estates Theatre in Prague on 21 December 1834. The original song consists of two stanzas (verses). Even if J. K. Tyl is said to have considered leaving the song out of the play, hesitating about its quality, it soon became most popular song from the Fiddlers' Feast which gained popularity among Czechs, seeking to revive their identity within the Habsburg monarchy, and quickly became their unofficial patriotic anthem.

Johann Strauss the Younger included the motif of Kde domov můj into his Slaven-Potpourri (Slavic Potpourri) of melodies of folk songs and dances (Op. 39, 1847). In 1882, Antonín Dvořák used Kde domov můj in his symphonic poem, overture to František Ferdinand Šamberk's play Josef Kajetán Tyl, which is often performed separately as Domov můj (My Home), a concert work of some ten minutes. Rainer Maria Rilke paid tribute to Kde domov můj, in Czech, in two poems, in German, published in Larenopfer (1895).

=== Adoption ===
Soon after Czechoslovakia was formed in 1918, the first verse of the song became the Czech part of the national anthem, followed by the first stanza of the Slovak song Nad Tatrou sa blýska with official translations into German and Hungarian.

During World War II German-controlled Protectorate of Bohemia and Moravia kept that song as its anthem. During the German-occupied Protectorate of Bohemia and Moravia (1939–1945), state kept song as its anthem. Regional anthem was usually played along with German anthems Deutschlandlied and Nazi Horst-Wessel-Lied.

With the split of Czechoslovakia in December 1992, the Czech Republic kept Kde domov můj and Slovakia kept Nad Tatrou sa blýska as their anthems. While Slovakia extended its anthem by adding a second verse, the Czech Republic's national anthem was adopted unextended, in its single-verse version.

== Law ==
The lyrics of the Czech stanza stayed on as Czech Republic's national anthem, according to Appendix 6 of Czech Act No. 3/1993 Coll., as adapted by Act No. 154/1998 Coll.

== Lyrics ==
=== Original song ===
Czech

IPA transcription (Note: See Help:IPA/Czech and Czech phonology.)

Kde domov můj, kde domov můj,
voda hučí po lučinách,
bory šumí po skalinách,
v sadě skví se jara květ,
zemský ráj to na pohled!
A to je ta krásná země,
𝄆 země česká domov můj! 𝄇

Kde domov můj, kde domov můj,
v kraji znáš-li bohumilém
duše útlé v těle čilém,
mysl jasnou, vznik a zdar
a tu sílu vzdoru zmar,
to je Čechů slavné plémě
𝄆 mezi Čechy domov můj! 𝄇

[ɡdɛ ˈdo.mof muːj | ɡdɛ ˈdo.mof muːj |]
[ˈvo.da ˈɦu.t͡ʃiː po ˈlu.t͡ʃɪ.naːx |]
[ˈbo.rɪ ˈʃu.miː po ˈska.lɪ.naːx |]
[ˈf‿sa.ɟɛ skviː sɛ ˈja.ra kvjɛt |]
[ˈzɛm.skiː raːj to na ˈpoɦ.lɛt ǁ]
[a to jɛ ta ˈkraːs.naː ˈzɛm.ɲɛ |]
𝄆 [ˈzɛm.ɲɛ ˈt͡ʃɛs.kaː ˈdo.mof muːj ǁ] 𝄇

[ɡdɛ ˈdo.mof muːj | ɡdɛ ˈdo.mof muːj |]
[ˈf‿kra.jɪ ˈznaːʃ.lɪ ˈbo.ɦu.mɪ.lɛːm]
[ˈdu.ʃɛ ˈuːt.lɛː ˈf‿cɛ.lɛ ˈt͡ʃɪ.lɛːm |]
[ˈmɪs.l̩ ˈjas.nou̯ vznɪk a zdar]
[a tu ˈsiː.lu vzdo.ru zmar |]
[to jɛ ˈt͡ʃɛ.xuː ˈslav.nɛː ˈplɛːm.ɲɛ]
𝄆 [ˈmɛ.zɪ ˈt͡ʃɛ.xɪ ˈdo.mof muːj ǁ] 𝄇

English translation

Where my home is, where my home is,
Streams are rushing through the meadows,
Midst the rocks sigh fragrant pine groves,
Orchards decked in spring's array,
Scenes of Paradise portray.
And this land of wondrous beauty,
𝄆 Is the Czech land, home of mine! 𝄇

Where my home is, where my home is,
If in heavenly land thou hast met
Slender souls in spry bodies,
Of clear mind, vigorous and prosperous,
And with strength ruining all defiance,
This glorious nation of Czechs
𝄆 Is of the Czechs, home of mine! 𝄇

=== National anthem of Czechoslovakia (1918–1992) ===
Czech and Slovak

IPA transcription

Kde domov můj, kde domov můj,
voda hučí po lučinách,
bory šumí po skalinách,
v sadě skví se jara květ,
zemský ráj to na pohled!
A to je ta krásná země,
𝄆 země česká domov můj! 𝄇

𝄆 Nad Tatrou sa blýska,
hromy divo bijú. 𝄇
𝄆 Zastavme sa, bratia,
veď sa ony stratia,
Slováci ožijú. 𝄇

[ɡdɛ ˈdo.mof muːj | ɡdɛ ˈdo.mof muːj |]
[ˈvo.da ˈɦu.t͡ʃiː po ˈlu.t͡ʃɪ.naːx |]
[ˈbo.rɪ ˈʃu.miː po ˈska.lɪ.naːx |]
[ˈf‿sa.ɟɛ skviː sɛ ˈja.ra kvjɛt |]
[ˈzɛm.skiː raːj to na ˈpoɦ.lɛt ǁ]
[a to jɛ ta ˈkraːs.naː ˈzɛm.ɲɛ |]
𝄆 [ˈzɛm.ɲɛ ˈt͡ʃɛs.kaː ˈdo.mof muːj ǁ] 𝄇

𝄆 [ˈnat ta.trɔʊ̯ sa ˈbliːs.ka |]
[ˈɦrɔ.mi ˈdi.ʋɔ ˈbi.juː ‖] 𝄇
𝄆 [ˈzas.taʊ̯ mɛ sa | ˈbra.cɪ̯a |]
[ˈʋɛc sa ˈɔ.ni ˈstra.cɪ̯a |]
[ˈslɔ.ʋaː.t͡si ˈɔ.ʒi.juː ǁ] 𝄇

German version
(first stanza 1918–1938, 1939–1945)

Hungarian version
(first stanza 1920–1938)

Wo ist mein Heim, mein Vaterland,
Wo durch Wiesen Bäche brausen,
Wo auf Felsen Wälder sausen,
Wo ein Eden uns entzückt,
Wenn der Lenz die Fluren schmückt:
Dieses Land, so schön vor allen,
𝄆 Böhmen ist mein Heimatland. 𝄇

Hol van honom, hol a hazám,
Hol patak zúg a hegyháton,
Csörgedez a rónaságon.
Szántóján ezer virág,
Gyönyörű ott a világ.
Földreszállott éden vagy te,
𝄆 Csehországom, szép bazám. 𝄇

English translation
(second stanza)

𝄆 Far above the Tatras
Lightning bolts are pounding. 𝄇
𝄆 These bolts shall we banish,
brothers, they will vanish;
Slovaks are rebounding. 𝄇

== Instrumentation ==
The orchestration of the hymn by Otakar Jeremiáš (1892–1962), in three versions – for large orchestra (1930), for small orchestra (1932), and in the so-called pastoral/Christmas version for organ and orchestra (1932) – is still performed today.

The current, and since 2008 newly official, recording of the Czech national anthem, released 2008 by the Czech government, orchestrated by Otakar Jeremiáš and Jaroslav Krček (*1939), was performed by the National Theatre Opera Chorus and Orchestra under the direction of Jiří Bělohlávek in four interpretations:

- instrumental version, National Theatre Orchestra
- choral version, National Theatre Opera Chorus
- female solo, sung by Kateřina Kněžíková, soprano *
- male solo, sung by Adam Plachetka, bass-baritone *

* *1982 and *1985, soloists of the National Theatre Opera, married since 2012, two daughters)

The celebratory performance of the new recordings took place on the Czech Statehood Day, Sunday, 28 September 2008, in the Pantheon of the Prague National Museum.
