= Conradin Kreutzer =

German composer and conductor (1780–1849)

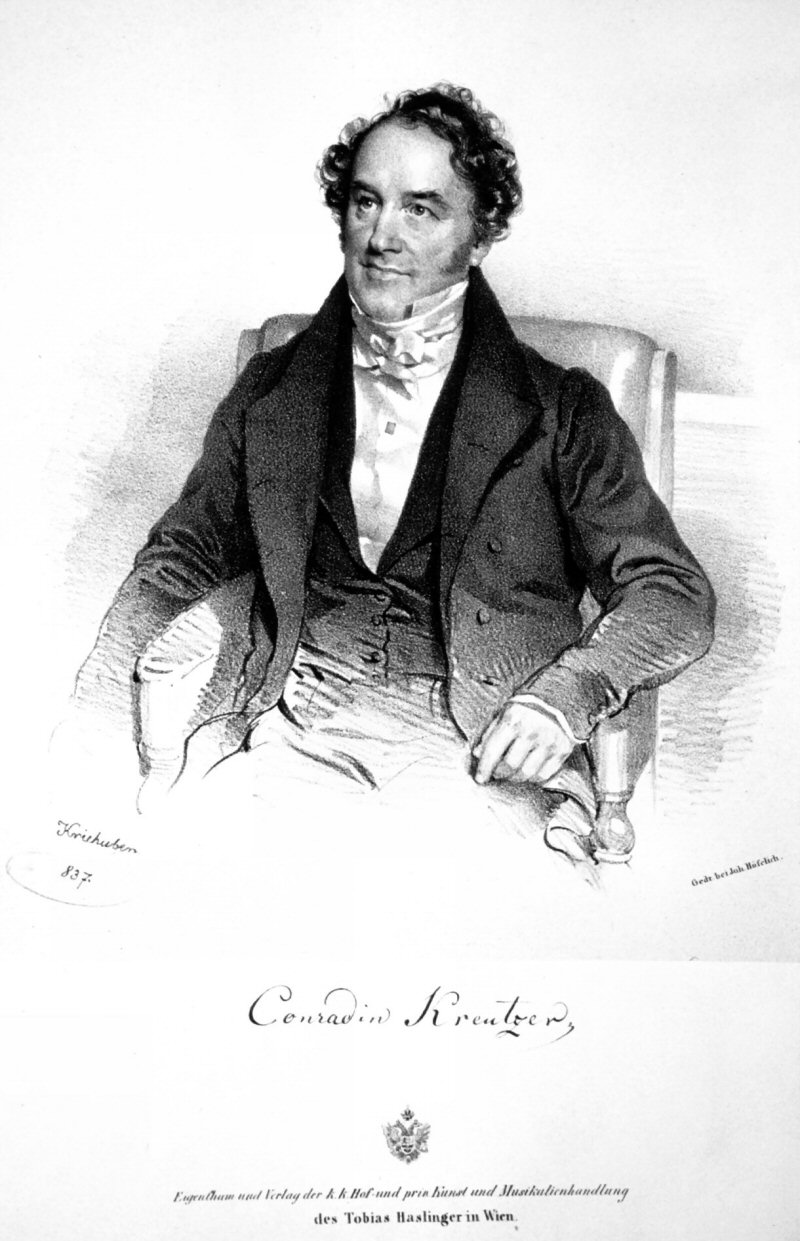
Lithograph by Josef Kriehuber, 1837

Conradin Kreutzer or Kreuzer (22 November 1780 – 14 December 1849) was a German composer and conductor. His works include the operas Das Nachtlager in Granada and incidental music to Der Verschwender, both produced in 1834 in Vienna.

== Biography ==
Born in Meßkirch, Baden, Kreutzer abandoned his studies in the law (University of Freiburg) and went to Vienna about 1804, where he met Ludwig van Beethoven, Joseph Haydn and may have studied with Johann Georg Albrechtsberger, while he tried his hand unsuccessfully at singspiele. He spent 1811–12 in Stuttgart, where at least three of his operas were staged and he was awarded the post of Hofkapellmeister, succeeding Franz Danzi. He was from 1812 to 1816 Kapellmeister to the king of Württemberg. Once he was successful, he became a prolific composer, and wrote a number of operas for the Theater am Kärntnertor, Theater in der Josefstadt and Theater an der Wien in Vienna, which have disappeared from the stage.

In 1840, he became conductor of the opera at Cologne. His daughters, Cecilia and Marie Kreutzer, were sopranos of some renown.

Kreutzer owes his fame almost exclusively to Das Nachtlager in Granada (1834), which kept the stage for half a century in spite of changes in musical taste. It was written in the style of Carl Maria von Weber. The same qualities are found in Kreutzer's part-songs for men's voices, which at one time were extremely popular in Germany. Among these "Das ist der Tag des Herrn" ("The Lord's Day"). His Septet for wind and strings, Op. 62, remains in the chamber music repertory. He was one of the 50 composers who wrote a variation on a waltz of Anton Diabelli for Part II of the "Vaterländischer Künstlerverein" (published 1824).

He died in Riga.

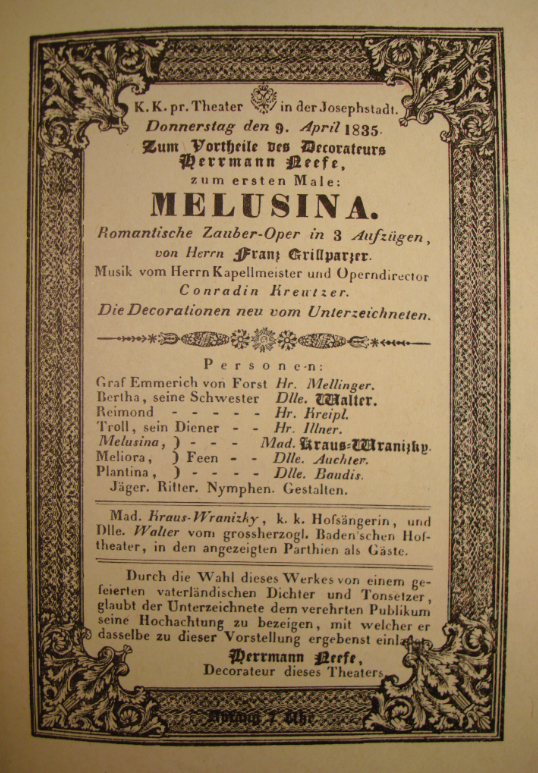
Poster of the opera Melusina, "Romantic magic opera" in 3 acts, libretto by Franz Grillparzer, music by Conradin Kreutzer (representation of April 9, 1835)

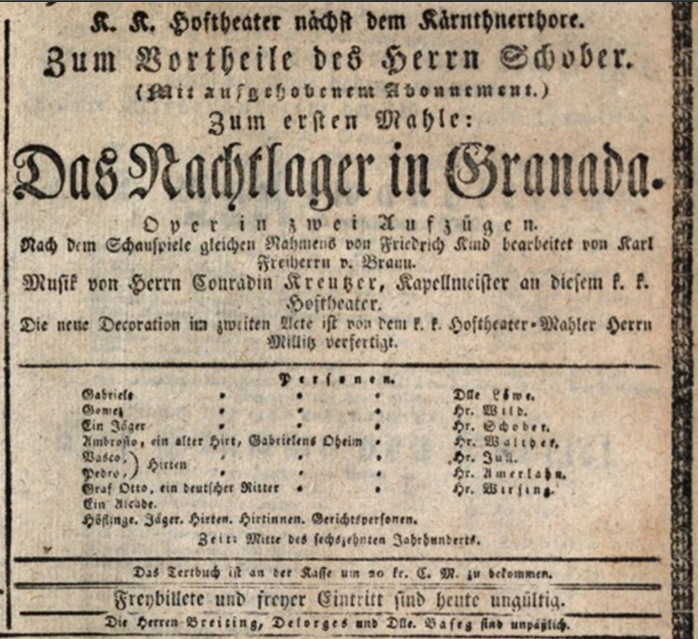
Poster of the opera Das Nachtlager von Granada

== Selected works ==
Operas

- Die Alpenhütte (August von Kotzebue), 1 March 1815, Stuttgart
- Adele von Budoy, one-act opera, 13 August 1821, Stadttheater Königsberg, revised as Cordelia, one act, 15 February 1823, Vienna, Theater am Kärntnertor
- Libussa, romantische Oper (Joseph Carl Bernard) 4 December 1822, Theater am Kärntnertor
- Melusina, romantische Oper (Franz Grillparzer) 27 February 1833, Berlin, Königstädtisches Theater
- Das Nachtlager in Granada, romantische Oper (Karl Johann Braun von Braunthal) 13 January 1834, Vienna, Theater in der Josefstadt
- Der Taucher (The Diver), 1813 and revised for premiere on 24 January 1824, Kärntnertortheater

Chamber works

- Septet in E♭, Op. 62 for clarinet, horn, bassoon, string trio, double bass (c.1816)
- Clarinet Trio in E♭ major, Op. 43
- Duo in C major
- Fantasia for Bassoon in F major
- Variations in G for the Chromatic Trumpet
- Variations in B♭ major for Bassoon and Piano

Orchestral works

- Piano Concerto No. 1 in B♭ major, Op. 42 (1818)
- Piano Concerto No. 2 in C minor, Op. 50 (1822)
- Piano Concerto No. 3 in E♭ major, Op. 65

Choral works

- Te Deum in D major, KWV 3301
- Abendlied

Vocal works

- Der Todte Fagott (The Dead Bassoon) for baritone, bassoon, and pianoforte
- Das Mühlrad song for soprano, clarinet and pianoforte
- Die Lüfte weh'n so lind (text by Elise Schlick)
- Frühlingsglaube
- "Hobellied" Da streiten sich die Leut' herum for Ferdinand Raimund's 1834 play Der Verschwender

Piano work

- Romanza for piano
