= Karel Strakatý =

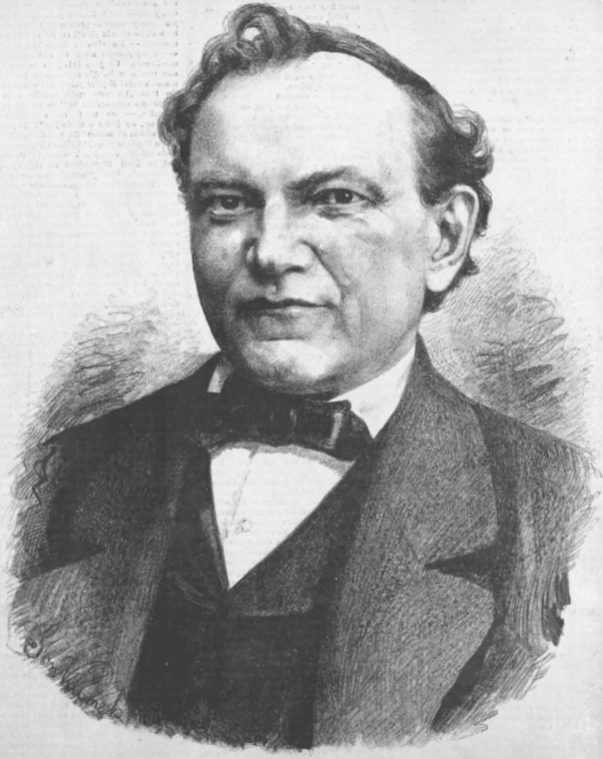
Karel Strakatý

Karel Strakatý (2 July 1804 in Blatná – 26 April 1868 in Prague) was a Czech operatic bass who had a lengthy career at the Estates Theatre in Prague from 1827 until his retirement in 1858. While there he portrayed more than 253 roles in over 3,230 performances. He is best remembered today's as the first interpreter of the Czech national anthem, "Kde domov můj?" (Where is my home?) which he performed in its premiere in 1834.

In addition to his work in the theatre, Strakatý was also active as a concert singer. He notably sang the role of Friar Laurence in Hector Berlioz's symphony Roméo et Juliette when it was performed in Prague for the first time on April 17, 1846. The concert was extremely successful and consolidated definitively the prestige of this French composer in Bohemia.
