= Josef Kajetán Tyl =

Czech dramatist, writer and actor

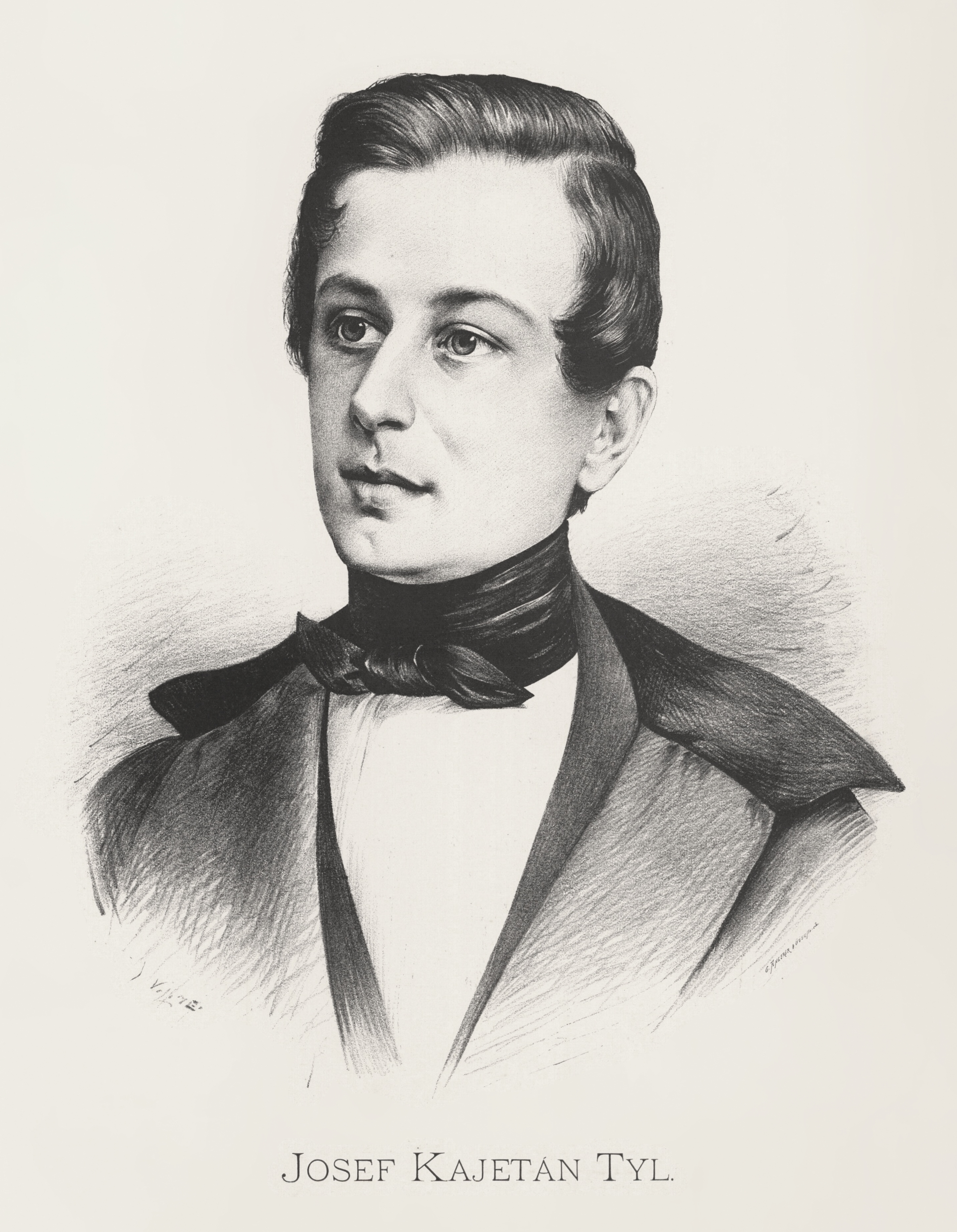
- Portrait of Tyl by Jan Vilímek
- Born: 4 February 1808; Kutná Hora, Bohemia, Austrian Empire
- Died: 11 July 1856 (aged 48); Plzeň, Bohemia, Austrian Empire
- Resting place: Mikulášský hřbitov, Plzeň
- Occupation: Writer
- Spouse: Magdalena Forchheimová
- Partner: Anna Forchheimová-Rajská
- Relatives: Jiří Tyl (father); Barbora Králiková (mother)
- Writing career
- Genre: Romanticism
- Notable works: Fidlovačka; Strakonický dudák

Josef Kajetán Tyl (4 February 1808 – 11 July 1856; Czech pronunciation: [ˈjozɛf ˈkajɛtaːn ˈtɪl]) was a Czech dramatist, writer and actor. He was a notable figure in the Czech National Revival movement and is best known as the author of the current national anthem of the Czech Republic titled Kde domov můj?.

== Life ==
Josef Kajetán Tyl was the first-born son of Jiří Tyl, a tailor and retired military band oboe player, and his wife Barbora née Králíková, daughter of a miller and groats maker. He was christened Josef František, yet this name was changed into Josef Kajetán when he underwent confirmation at the age of eleven. The family surname had several written forms – Tylly, Tylli, Tilly or Tyll – and was later changed to Tyl. Josef Kajetán had four younger siblings: one brother and three sisters, but except sister Anna none of them survived to adulthood.

After finishing elementary school, Josef Kajetán studied at a grammar school in Prague and in Hradec Králové. Among his teachers belonged the leading Czech linguist and writer Josef Jungmann and the playwright Václav Kliment Klicpera. After finishing his studies at the grammar school, he started to study philosophy in Prague.

Already as a student, Tyl started to be active in theatre and finally left school to become a member of the Hilmer traveling theatre company. When the company disbanded after two years of journeying around the countryside, he returned to Prague and got a job as a clerk in an infantry regiment's office. In his free time, he wrote theatre plays and worked as an actor at the Estates Theatre. Due to his abilities, he could leave his job in the military in 1842, as he was given a full-time job at the Estates Theatre, where he became the director, organizer, and playwright of the Czech ensemble in the otherwise mainly German theatre.

In 1833 Tyl became a redactor of a renewed Czech magazine called Květy (Blossoms), which exists until today. He was also a redactor of the magazines Vlastimil and Pražský posel (Prague Messenger), and of the newspaper Sedlské noviny (Farmer´s newspaper), that were later banned because of his political involvement.

Tyl used several pen names that were often derived from the name of his hometown Kutná Hora, for example, Horský, Horník, Kutnohorský, and Vítek.

In the revolutionary year 1848, Tyl became politically active and was briefly a member of the Austrian parliament in Vienna. Because he fought for the independence of the Czech nation from the Austrian Empire, he was later marked as politically unreliable by the authorities and expelled from the Estates Theatre. He wanted to found his own traveling theatre company but his request was rejected, so in 1851 he joined an existing one and left for a tour, together with his family. Yet the theatre company did not fare well, and the Tyl family ended up in poverty. In 1856, during his theatre's stay in Plzeň, the 48 years old Tyl died of an unknown illness and was buried at a local cemetery.

A theatre in Plzeň was later named in his honour Josef Kajetán Tyl Theatre.

== Work ==
Tyl was an author of several novels and short stories, but he is most famous for his about 20 theatre plays, which can be divided into several groups.

=== Plays describing the life of the Czech society in Tyl's time period ===
- Paličova dcera (Arsonist's daughter)
- Pražský flamendr (Prague playboy)
- Bankrotář (Bankrupter)
- Chudý kejklíř (Poor Juggler)

=== Plays portraying famous events from Czech history (especially the Hussite movement) ===
- Jan Hus
- Žižka z Trocnova (Žižka of Trocnov)
- Krvavý soud aneb kutnohorští havíři (A Bloody Verdict: The Miners of Kutná Hora)
- Krvavé křtiny, aneb Drahomíra a její synové (Bloody Baptism, or Drahomíra and Her Sons)

=== Plays featuring fairy tale characters (fairies, witches) ===
- Strakonický dudák (The Bagpiper of Strakonice) – one of his most famous works
- Lesní panna aneb cesta do Ameriky (The Forest Maiden: A Journey to America)
- Tvrdohlavá žena (The Stubborn Woman)
- Jiříkovo vidění (George's Vision)
- Čert na zemi (Devil On Earth)

=== Other plays ===
- Paní Marjánka, matka pluku (Lady Marjánka, Mother of the Regiment)
- Fidlovačka – a song from this play, named Kde domov můj, became the Czech national anthem in 1918
- Slepý mládenec (The Blind Young Man)

== Family ==
Tyl's wife was a Czech actress Magdalena Forchheimová (1803–1870), who performed under the pen name Skalná. Tyl met her in 1829 during his first tour with a traveling theatre company, where they both performed. They married on 28 January 1839, yet their marriage stayed childless, as after a stillbirth Magdalena could not have any more children.

In 1841 Tyl fell in love with his wife's much younger sister Anna, who was also a talented actress and performed under the pen name Anna Rajská (1824–1903). They started an affair, Tyl did not divorce or leave his wife however and all three of them lived together in one household until his death. Anna bore her brother-in-law eight illegitimate children, their youngest son was born one month after Tyl died. Their sons went by their mother's surname Forchheim, daughters were allowed by the authorities to use father's surname Tyl.

On 24 April 1861, five years after Tyl's death, Anna married Tyl's colleague, actor Josef Ladislav Turnovský, with whom she had three more children. Turnovský took care not only of Tyl's family but also of his legacy by saving his manuscripts and publishing his works.

=== Children of Josef Kajetán Tyl ===
- Josef Otakar Forchheim (1843–1907)
- Jan Stanislav Forchheim (1845–1890)
- Marie Eleonora Tylová (1848–1868)
- Eliška Tylová (1850–1909)
- Vojtěch Josef Forchheim (1851–1862)
- František K. Forchheim (1853–1902)
- stillborn boy (1855–1855)
- Kajetán Josef Forchheim (1856–?)
