= Bocek =

Bocek may refer to:

- Mark Bocek (born 1981), Canadian mixed martial artist
- Milt Bocek (1912–2007), American baseball player
- Boček, a Czech given name and surname
- Böcek (disambiguation)
