= Boček =

Boček (feminine: Bočková) is a Czech given name and surname. It originated in two ways: as a diminutive of the surname Bok and as an abbreviation of the word levoboček ('illegitimate child'). Notable people with the name include:

== Given name ==
- Boček I of Poděbrady (diesd 1373), Czech noble
- Boček II of Poděbrady (died 1417), Czech noble
- Boček III of Poděbrady (died 1429), Czech noble
- Boček IV of Poděbrady (1442–1496), Czech noble
- Hynek Boček of Poděbrady (died 1426), Czech noble

== Surname ==
- Emil Boček (1923–2023), Czech World War II veteran
- Martin Boček (born 1976), Czech footballer
- Mark Bocek (born 1981), Canadian mixed martial artist
- Milt Bocek (1912–2007), American baseball player

== See also ==
- Bochek
- Böcek (disambiguation)
