= Kunigunde of Sternberg =

Bohemian noblewoman (1425–1449)

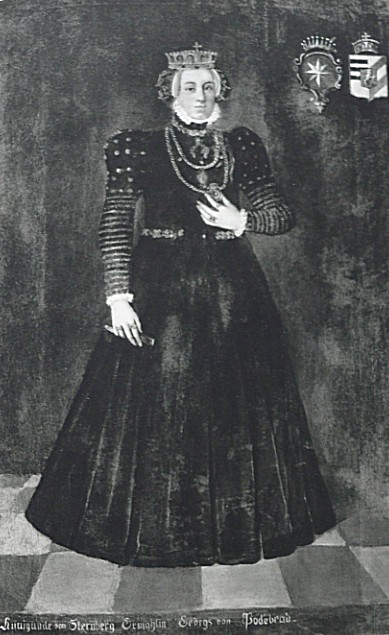
- Born: 18 November 1425; Konopiště
- Died: 19 November 1449 (aged 24); Poděbrady
- Spouse: George of Poděbrady
- Issue: Boček IV of Poděbrady; Victor, Duke of Münsterberg; Barbara, Duchess of Lipé; Henry the Elder; Catherine of Poděbrady, Queen of Hungary; Sidonie of Poděbrady
- Father: Smil of Sternberg
- Mother: Barbara of Pardubice

Kunigunde of Sternberg (Czech: Kunhuta ze Šternberka; 18 November 1425, Konopiště – 19 November 1449, Poděbrady) was the first wife of George of Poděbrady, who later became King of Bohemia.

== Life ==
Kunigunde's parents were the Bohemian nobles Smil of Sternberg (d. 1431) and Barbara of Pardubice (d. 1433). In 1441 she married the 21-year-old George of Poděbrady, who had been captain of the old Bohemian circle of Stará Boleslav since 1440. This marriage produced three sons:

- Boček (1442–1496)
- Victor (1443–1500) and
- Henry the Elder (1448–1498)

and three daughters:

- Barbara (1446–1474), married first with Henry of Lipé (Jindřich z Lipé, d. 1469), and second with Jan Křinecký of Ronov
- Catherine (1449–1464), married Matthias, King of Hungary; and
- Zdenka (1449–1510) (also known as Sidonie of Poděbrady; Catherine's twin)

In 1444 Kunigunde founded a hospital in Poděbrady. It was named after her and remained in operation until the beginning of the 20th century. She also established a foundation for youth education, school construction and rehabilitation of prisoners.

She died in 1449, the day after her twenty-fourth birthday and 9 days after giving birth to twin daughters. She was buried in the parish church Exaltation of the Holy Cross in Poděbrady.
