= Sidonie of Poděbrady =

Duchess consort of Saxony (1449–1510)

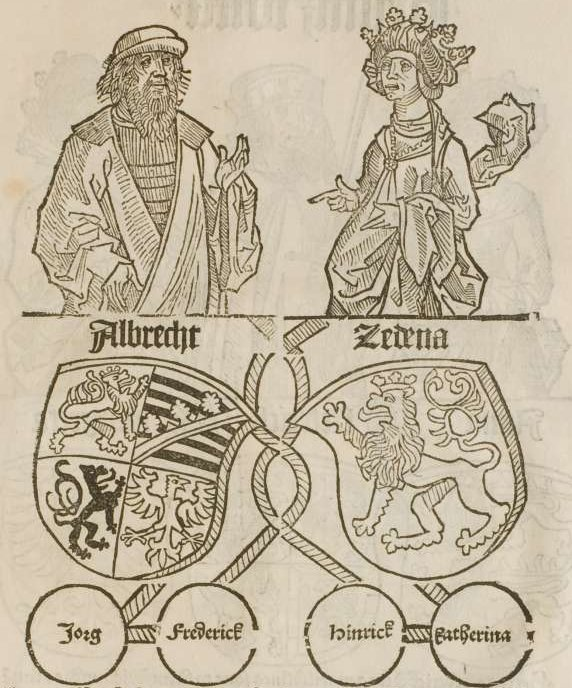
- Sidonie and Albert

Duchess consort of Saxony Margravine consort of Meissen
- Tenure: 1464–1500
- Born: 11 November 1449
- Died: 1 February 1510 (aged 60); Tharandt
- Burial: Meissen
- Spouse: Albert III, Duke of Saxony
- Issue: Catherine, Duchess of Austria; George, Duke of Saxony; Henry IV, Duke of Saxony; Frederick, Grand Master of the Teutonic Order
- House: Poděbrady
- Father: George of Poděbrady
- Mother: Kunigunde of Sternberg

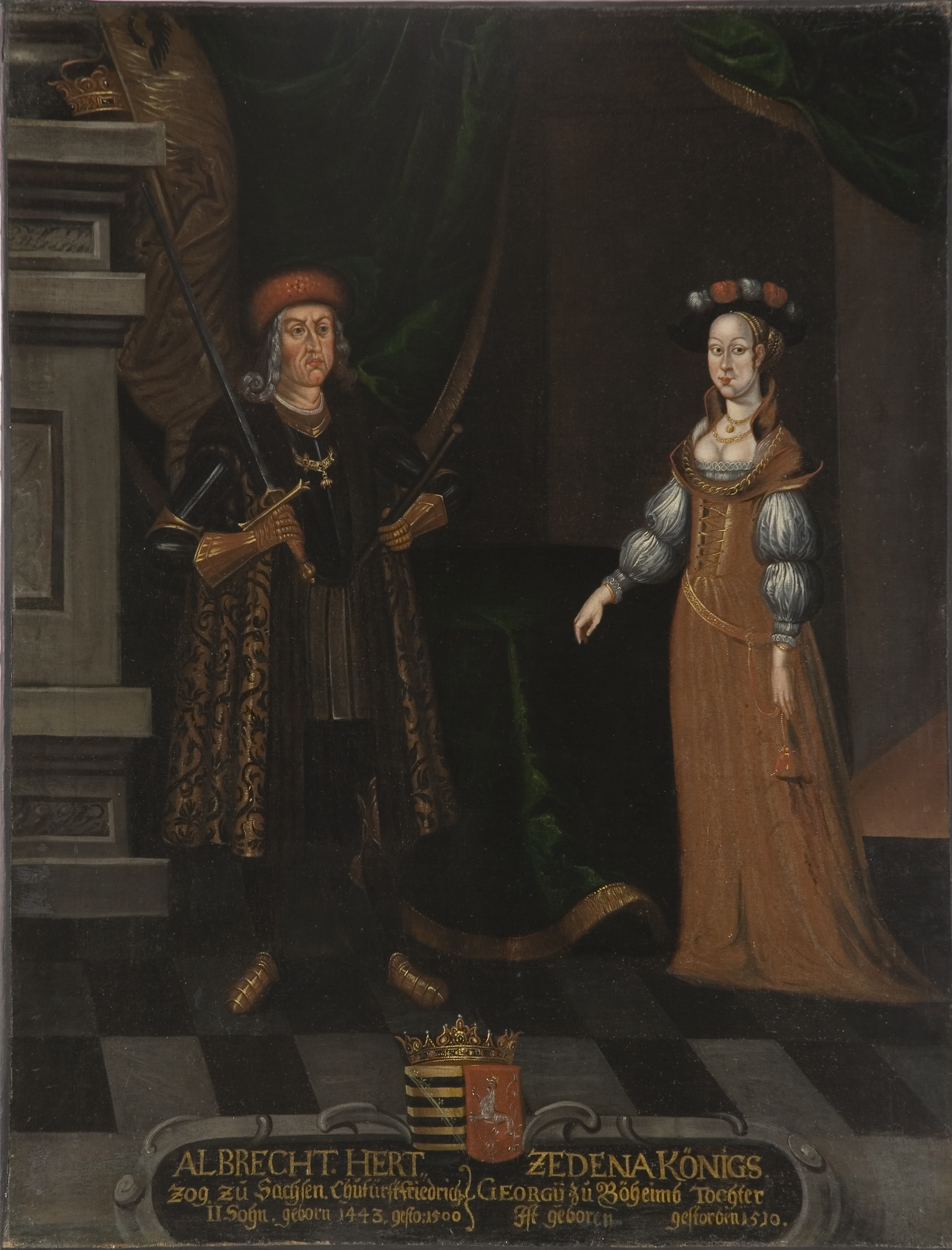
Albrekt and Sidonie.

Sidonie of Poděbrady (Czech: Zdenka z Poděbrad; 11 November 1449 – 1 February 1510) was a duchess consort of Saxony as the wife of Albert III. She was the daughter of George of Poděbrady, King of Bohemia, and his first wife Kunigunde of Sternberg. She was the twin sister of Catherine of Poděbrady, wife of Matthias Corvinus of Hungary.

== Early life ==
Sidonie and Catherine were born on 11 November 1449 to the Bohemian king. The girls' mother, Kunigunde, died from complications of the birth. Sidonie's father eventually remarried; his second wife, Johanna of Rožmitál, bore George more children, including Ludmila of Poděbrady.

Sidonie had four older siblings, but none of her brothers inherited Bohemia from their father. The crown passed instead to Vladislaus II of Bohemia and Hungary.

Sidonie's paternal grandparents were Vítek of Poděbrady and his wife Anna of Vartenberk. Her maternal grandparents were Smil of Sternberg and his wife Barbara of Pardubice.

== Marriage ==
A marriage contract was signed on 11 November 1459 for Sidonie's marriage to Albert, son of Frederick II, Elector of Saxony. The couple married on 11 February 1464. Sidonie followed her husband to Meissen, and the consummation of their marriage took place in May 1464 at Castle Tharandt. Four months after their marriage, Albert's father died, and he became Duke of Saxony with Sidonie as Duchess consort.

Sidonie was a pious Catholic woman who abhorred violence. She therefore refused to accompany her husband during his wars in Groningen and Friesland. In protest, she took her children to Albrechtsburg.

In 1495 she founded the religious festival of the Holy Lance, after being freed from a stone disease.

Many of her letters of correspondence have been preserved, in which she pleads for the release of prisoners. On 12 September 1500, Albert died, leaving Sidonie a widow. She withdrew from the Saxon court and spent the rest of her years in Tharandt. On 1 February 1510 she died there. Sidonie was buried at the cathedral of Meissen.

== Issue ==
Sidonie and Albert were married for thirty-six years, during which time they had nine children:

- Katharina (b. Meissen, 24 July 1468 – d. Göttingen, 10 February 1524), married firstly on 24 February 1484 in Innsbruck to Duke Sigismund of Austria, and secondly on 1497 to Duke Eric I of Brunswick-Calenberg
- Georg "the Bearded" (b. Meissen, 27 August 1471 – d. Dresden, 17 April 1539)
- Heinrich V "der Fromme" (b. Dresden, 16 March 1473 – d. Dresden, 18 August 1541)
- Frederick (b. Torgau, 26 October 1474 – d. Rochlitz, 14 December 1510), Grand Master of the Teutonic Knights
- Anna (b. Dresden, 3 August 1478 – d. Dresden, 1479)
- Stillborn child (1479)
- Louis (b. Torgau, 28 September 1481 – d. Torgau?, some days later / d. Torgau?, young after 1498) [?]
- John (b. and d. Torgau, 24 June 1484)
- John (b. Torgau, 2 December 1498 – d. Torgau?, some days later / d. Torgau?, young in September of the same year as his brother Louis) [?].

Sidonie of Poděbrady Poděbrady Born: 14 November 1449 Died: 1 February 1510
Royal titles
Preceded by Margaret of Austria	Duchess consort of Saxony; Margravine consort of Meissen; 7 September 1464 – 12 September 1500	Succeeded by Barbara Jagiellon
