= Victor, Duke of Münsterberg =

15th-century Czech nobleman

- Born: 29 May 1443; Cieszyn
- Died: 30 August 1500 (aged 57); Cieszyn
- Noble family: Poděbrady
- Spouses: Margaret Ptáček of Pirkstein; Sophie of Teschen; Margarete Palaiologa of Montferrat
- Father: George of Poděbrady
- Mother: Kunigunde of Sternberg

Victor, Duke of Münsterberg also: Victor, Duke of Münsterberg and Opava; Czech: Viktorin z Minsterberka; (29 May 1443 in Cieszyn – 30 August 1500 in Cieszyn) was an Imperial Count from 1459 and Count of Kladsko. From 1462 until his death, he was Duke of Münsterberg, and from 1465 to 1485 Duke of Opava.

== Family background ==
Victor was the second son of the Bohemian king George of Poděbrady and his wife Kunigunde of Sternberg. In 1463 he married Margaret Ptáčková, the only daughter of Hynek Ptáček of Pirkstein, who died in 1472. Two years later he married Sophie, daughter of Duke Boleslaw II of Cieszyn. After her death in 1479, he married in 1480 Helena-Margarete Palaiologa, daughter of John IV, Marquess of Montferrat (d. 1496). From these marriages, he had several daughters:

- Johanna (1463–1496), married to Duke Casimir II of Cieszyn
- Magdalena (d. 1497), Cistercian in Trzebnica
- Anna (d. 1498)
- Uršula (died after 1534) until 1529 nun in the Magdalene convent in Świebodzice
- Apolonia (d. 1534), first Poor Clare in Strzelin, then married to Erhard of Queis

and two sons:

- Lawrence (Vavřinec; d. 1503)
- Bartholomew (c. 1477–1515), a prominent diplomat; died in a shipwreck on the Danube near Hainburg an der Donau; with him Victor's heirs in the male line died out

== Life ==
Because Victor's older brother Boček was mentally challenged, the duties of the first-born were transferred to Victor. Consequently, he had to stand by his father politically from a young age. His father asked emperor Frederick III to appoint Victor to imperial count, which the emperor did in 1449. In 1462, the appointment was confirmed and at the same time his younger brothers Henry the Elder and Henry the Younger were also appointed imperial count. A little earlier, George had appointed Victor and both Henries Dukes of Münsterberg both of Opava (which he had acquired in 1464) and Counts of Kladsko. These areas were ruled by the brothers jointly until George's death in 1471.

As a participant in the campaign against the Hungarian king Matthias Corvinus Victor was captured by the Hungarians in 1469 in Moravia. He was released after two years, after paying a large ransom and secretly converting to Catholicism. After his release, he was a support of Corvinus for a while,

After George's death in 1471, his sons divided the inheritance, according to a plan they agreed on in 1472. Victor received the Duchy of Opava. Later, his brother Henry the Younger gave him the Pless, which Victor then sold to his brother-in-law Duke Casimir II of Cieszyn. At the request of Corvin, Victor agreed in 1485 to a contract by which he had to give the Duchy of Opava to Matthias Corvinus's illegitimate son John, and received several castles in Slavonia in return. When Matthias died in 1490, Victor hoped that Opava would be returned to him, but that did not happen.

Although the three brothers had sold the County of Kladsko in 1501 to their future brother-in-law Ulrich of Hardegg, they retained the title of Counts of Kladsko for themselves and their descendants until their extinction in the male line in 1647.
