= Bochek =

Bochek (Ukrainian: Бочек) is a Slavic surname. It may refer to:

- Pyotr Bochek (1925–2018), Soviet Army officer.
- Kseniia Bochek (born 2009), Ukrainian diver.

== See also ==
- Boček
