= Catherine of Poděbrady =

Queen of Hungary (1449–1464)

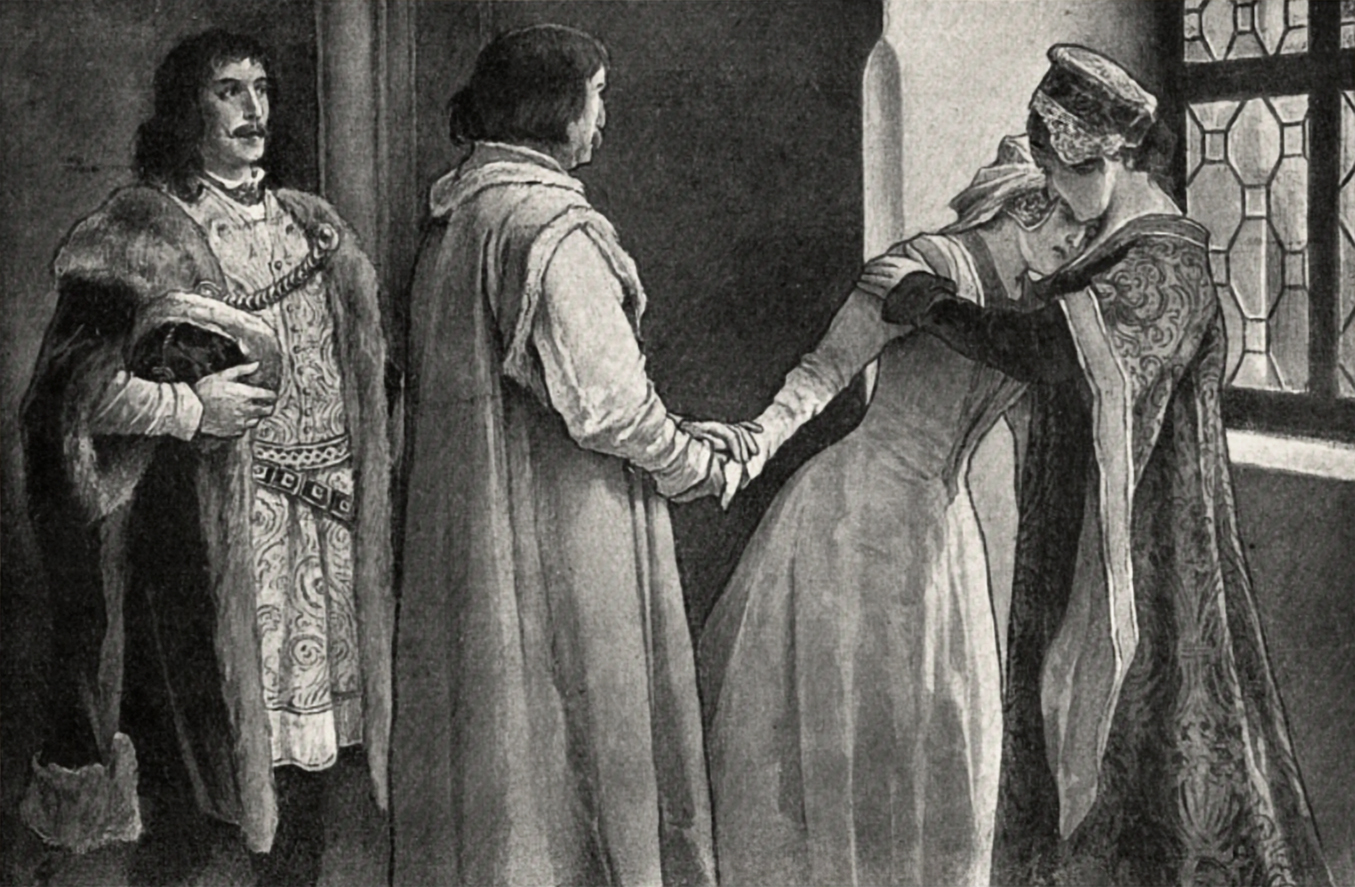
- Catherine leaving her father and stepmother to live in Hungary

Queen consort of Hungary and Croatia
- Tenure: 1 May 1463 – 8 March 1464
- Born: 11 November 1449; Poděbrady
- Died: 8 March 1464 (aged 14); Buda
- Spouse: Matthias Corvinus of Hungary (m. 1463)
- Issue: 1
- House: Poděbrady
- Father: George of Poděbrady
- Mother: Kunigunde of Sternberg

Catherine of Poděbrady (11 November 1449 – 8 March 1464) was Queen of Hungary as the second wife of King Matthias Corvinus.

== Biography ==
Catherine and her twin sister Sidonie were born at Poděbrady to the Bohemian king George of Poděbrady and his first wife, Kunigunde of Šternberk. Kunigunde died from complications of the birth. George of Poděbrady eventually remarried; his second wife, Joanna of Rožmitál, bore George more children, including Ludmila of Poděbrady.

Matthias Corvinus had lost his wife, Elisabeth of Cilli, at a young age. On 1 May 1463 he married Catherine at Matthias Church in Buda. Matthias was eighteen, his bride thirteen. The wedding negotiations had begun in 1458 when Catherine was nine years old. Soon after the marriage, Catherine left her family and went to live in Hungary with her new husband. Janus Pannonius helped teach Catherine Latin.

The queen died in childbirth at the age of 14. Her child died as well. The event caused Matthias to lose hope of siring a legitimate heir. He eventually married Beatrice of Naples, but that marriage also failed to produce an heir. Matthias's only surviving offspring was an illegitimate son, John Corvinus, by his mistress Barbara Edelpöck.

Catherine of Poděbrady House of Poděbrady Born: 1449 Died: 1464
Royal titles
Preceded by Elizabeth of Luxembourg	Queen consort of Hungary; 1463–1464	Succeeded by Beatrice of Naples
