= Boček IV of Poděbrady =

- Born: 15 July 1442
- Died: 28 September 1496 (aged 54); Kladsko
- Father: George of Poděbrady
- Mother: Kunigunde of Sternberg

Boček IV of Poděbrady (also known as: Boczek IV of Kunstadt and Podebrady; Czech: Boček IV z Poděbrad; 15 July 1442 – 28 September 1496, in Kladsko), was, by title, the last member of the Bohemian noble family of Poděbrady, who were descended from the Lords of Kunštát.

== Life ==
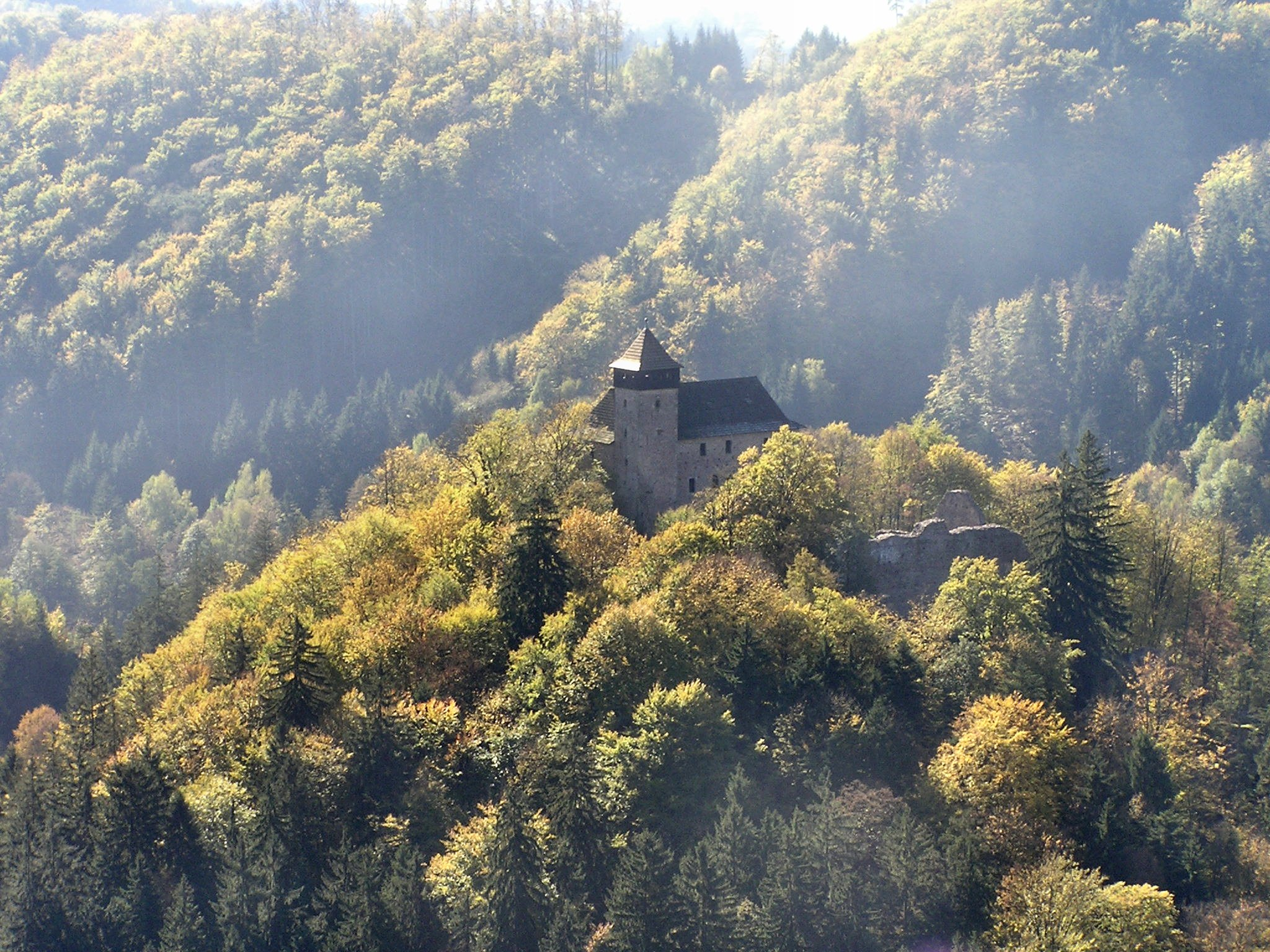
Litice Castle

Boček's parents were the later King of Bohemia George of Poděbrady and his wife Kunigunde of Sternberg. His exact birth date is not known. Following the family tradition, Boček received, as his baptismal name, the name of many of his ancestors from the house of the Lords of Kunstadt.

Although he was the firstborn, his father did not expect Boček to succeed him as Count, because of a mental disability. Unlike his three younger brothers, Victor, Henry the Elder and Henry the Younger, Boček was not created an Imperial Prince and he was not made Count of Kladsko. Since he also was not a Duke of Münsterberg, he could claim that, by title, he was the last member of the noble family of Poděbrady.

In 1458, after George had been elected as King of Bohemia, he transferred the Poděbrady possessions of Náchod and Hummel to his sons Boček and Victor, though he reserved the right to appoint the captains. A year later, the brothers confirmed Náchod's existing privileges and granted more. In 1465, King George transferred parts of the former possessions of the monastery at Opatovice nad Labem to common ownership of Boček and his brothers. However, when later in the same year, he transferred possession of Münsterberg and Kladsko to the three brothers, Boček was not included.

After King George's unexpected death in 1471, his sons agreed on 1 February 1472 at Poděbrady Castle to divide the inheritance. Boček received Litice Castle, which included Rychmberk Castle and the Častolovice and Černíkovice and the town of Týniště nad Orlicí and half of each of the cities Žamberk and Choceň and the town of Kunvald. He also received the city of Jičín, the Lordship of Veliš u Jičína, the estates of the monastery Postoloprty and a number of smaller estates. His brothers received larger estates, but they committed themselves to paying Boček 370 Prague groschens in compensation. Mount Zlaté, with its mines, remained common property; its profits were to be divided among the brothers equally. Henry the Elder received the estates of Náchod and Hummel, that had been joint property of Boček and Victor until then.

The inheritance division of 1472 is the last document that Boček has personally and independently worked on. He is mentioned in later documents, but always in the context of someone else representing him or acting on his behalf. Since Victor spent most of his time in Hungarian captivity, Henry the Elder probably acted as Boček's guardian. Around 1491, Henry the Elder acquired some of Boček's larger East Bohemian possessions, belonging to the Lordship of Litice nad Orlicí. Henry sold these during Boček's lifetime to William II of Pernstein. It is believed that Henry the Elder, when he assumed ownership of Litice, committed himself to caring for Boček for the rest of his life.

Boček died on 28 September 1496 on Henry the Elder's castle in Kladsko. He was not married and had no children. There he was buried, in the church of the Franciscan monastery that Henry the Elder had built. In 1558, Boček and eight relatives who had also been buried there, were reburied in main church in Glatz.
