= Matthias Corvinus =

King of Hungary and Croatia from 1458 to 1490

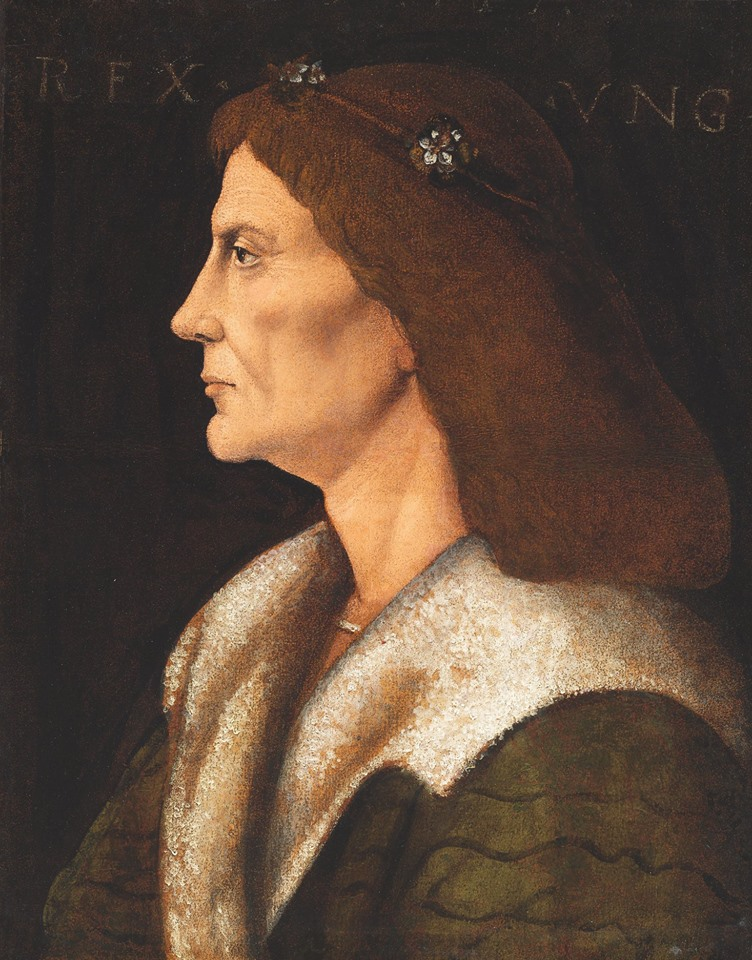
- Portrait by Andrea Mantegna

King of Hungary and Croatia
- Reign: 24 January 1458 – 6 April 1490
- Coronation: 29 March 1464
- Predecessor: Ladislaus V
- Successor: Vladislaus II
- Regent: Michael Szilágyi (1458)

King of Bohemia contested by George and Vladislaus II
- Reign: 1469–1490
- Predecessor: George
- Successor: Vladislaus II

Archduke of Austria contested by Frederick V
- Reign: 1487–1490
- Predecessor: Frederick V
- Successor: Frederick V
- Born: 23 February 1443; Kolozsvár, Hungary (now Cluj-Napoca, Romania)
- Died: 6 April 1490 (aged 47); Vienna, Austria
- Burial: Royal Basilica, Székesfehérvár
- Spouse: Elizabeth of Celje (m. 1455; died 1455); Catherine of Poděbrady (m. 1463; died 1464); Beatrice of Naples (m. 1475)
- Issue Detail: John Corvinus (illegitimate)
- House: Hunyadi
- Father: John Hunyadi
- Mother: Elizabeth Szilágyi
- Religion: Roman Catholic

Matthias Corvinus (Hungarian: Hunyadi Mátyás; Romanian: Matia/Matei Corvin; Croatian: Matija/Matijaš Korvin; Slovene: Matija Korvin/Kralj Matjaž; Slovak: Matej Korvín; Czech: Matyáš Korvín; 23 February 1443 – 6 April 1490) was King of Hungary and Croatia from 1458 to 1490, as Matthias I. He is often given the epithet "the Just". After conducting several military campaigns, he was elected King of Bohemia in 1469 and adopted the title Duke of Austria in 1487. He was the son of John Hunyadi, Regent of Hungary, who died in 1456. In 1457, Matthias was imprisoned along with his older brother, Ladislaus Hunyadi, on the orders of King Ladislaus the Posthumous. Ladislaus Hunyadi was executed, causing a rebellion that forced King Ladislaus to flee Hungary. After the King died unexpectedly, Matthias's uncle Michael Szilágyi persuaded the Estates to unanimously proclaim the 14-year-old Matthias as king on 24 January 1458. He began his rule under his uncle's guardianship, but he took effective control of government within two weeks.

As king, Matthias waged wars against the Czech mercenaries who dominated Upper Hungary (today parts of Slovakia and Northern Hungary) and against Frederick III, Holy Roman Emperor, who claimed Hungary for himself. In this period, the Ottoman Empire conquered Serbia and Bosnia, terminating the zone of buffer states along the southern frontiers of the Kingdom of Hungary. Matthias signed a peace treaty with Frederick III in 1463, acknowledging the Emperor's right to style himself King of Hungary. The Emperor returned the Holy Crown of Hungary with which Matthias was crowned on 29 March 1464. In this year, Matthias invaded the territories that had recently been occupied by the Ottomans and seized fortresses in Bosnia. He soon realized he could expect no substantial aid from the Christian powers and gave up his anti-Ottoman policy.

Matthias introduced new taxes and regularly set taxation at extraordinary levels. These measures caused a rebellion in Transylvania in 1467, but he subdued the rebels. The next year, Matthias declared war on George of Poděbrady, the Hussite King of Bohemia, and conquered Moravia, Silesia, and Lusatia, but he could not occupy Bohemia proper. The Catholic Estates proclaimed him King of Bohemia on 3 May 1469, but the Hussite lords refused to yield to him even after the death of their leader George of Poděbrady in 1471. Instead, they elected Vladislaus Jagiellon, the eldest son of Casimir IV of Poland. A group of Hungarian prelates and lords offered the throne to Vladislaus's younger brother Casimir, but Matthias overcame their rebellion. Having routed the united troops of Casimir IV and Vladislaus at Breslau in Silesia (now Wrocław in Poland) in late 1474, Matthias turned against the Ottomans, who had devastated the eastern parts of Hungary. He sent reinforcements to Stephen the Great, Prince of Moldavia, enabling Stephen to repel a series of Ottoman invasions in the late 1470s. In 1476, Matthias besieged and seized Šabac, an important Ottoman border fort. He concluded a peace treaty with Vladislaus Jagiellon in 1478, confirming the division of the Lands of the Bohemian Crown between them. Matthias waged a war against Emperor Frederick and occupied Lower Austria between 1482 and 1487.

Matthias established one of the earliest professional standing armies of medieval Europe (the Black Army of Hungary), reformed the administration of justice, reduced the power of the barons, and promoted the careers of talented individuals chosen for their abilities rather than their social statuses. Matthias patronized art and science; his royal library, the Bibliotheca Corviniana, was one of the largest collections of books in Europe. With his patronage, Hungary became the first country to embrace the Renaissance from Italy. As Matthias the Just, the monarch who wandered among his subjects in disguise, he remains a popular hero of Hungarian and Slovak folk tales.

== Early life ==
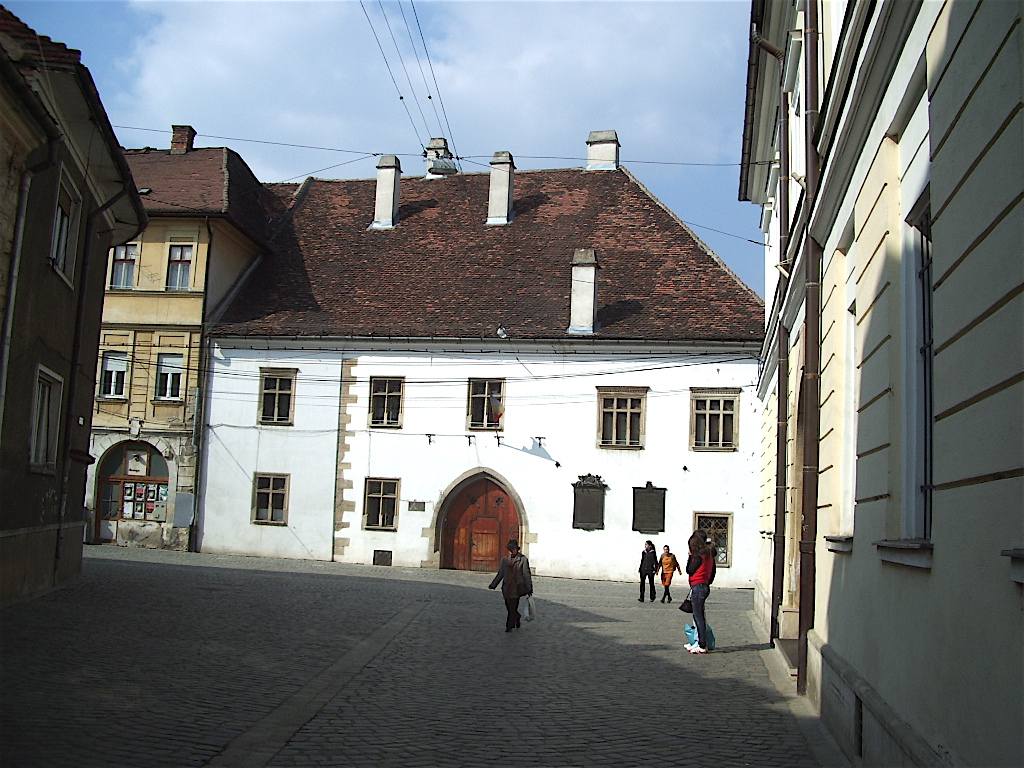
The house where Matthias Corvinus was born in Kolozsvár (present-day Cluj-Napoca, Romania)

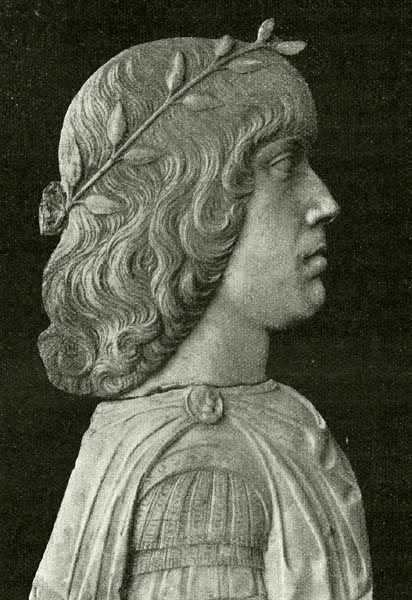
Matthias Corvinus as a young monarch. Museum of Sforza Castle, Milan, Italy.

=== Childhood (1443–1457) ===
Matthias was born in Kolozsvár (now Cluj-Napoca in Romania) on 23 February 1443. He was the second son of John Hunyadi and his wife, Elizabeth Szilágyi. Matthias' education was managed by his mother due to his father's absence. Many of the most learned men of Central Europe, including Gregory of Sanok and John Vitéz, frequented John Hunyadi's court when Matthias was a child. Gregory of Sanok, a former tutor of King Vladislaus III of Poland, was Matthias's only teacher whose name is known. Under these scholars' influences, Matthias became an enthusiastic supporter of Renaissance humanism.

As a child, Matthias learnt many languages and read classical literature, especially military treatises. According to Antonio Bonfini, Matthias "was versed in all the tongues of Europe", with the exceptions of Turkish and Greek. Although this was an exaggeration, it is without doubt that Matthias spoke Hungarian, Latin, Italian, Polish, Czech, and German. Bonfini also wrote that he needed an interpreter to speak with a POW during his Moldavian campaign. On the other hand, the late 16th-century Polish historian Krzystoff Warszewiecki wrote that Matthias had been able to understand the Romanian language of the envoys of Stephen the Great, Prince of Moldavia.

According to a treaty between John Hunyadi and Đurađ Branković, Despot of Serbia, Matthias and the Despot's granddaughter Elizabeth of Celje were engaged on 7 August 1451. Elizabeth was the daughter of Ulrich II, Count of Celje, who was related to King Ladislaus the Posthumous and an opponent of Matthias's father. Because of new conflicts between Hunyadi and Ulrich of Celje, the marriage of their children only took place in 1455. Elizabeth settled in the Hunyadis' estates, but Matthias was soon sent to the royal court, implying that their marriage was a hidden exchange of hostages between their families. Elizabeth died before the end of 1455.

John Hunyadi died on 11 August 1456, less than three weeks after his greatest victory over the Ottomans in Belgrade. John's elder son, who was Matthias's brother, Ladislaus became the head of the family. Ladislaus's conflict with Ulrich of Celje ended with Ulrich's capture and assassination on 9 November 1456. Under duress, the King promised he would never take his revenge against the Hunyadis for Ulrich's killing. However, the murder turned most barons, including Palatine Ladislaus Garai, Judge royal Ladislaus Pálóci, and Nicholas Újlaki, Voivode of Transylvania, against Ladislaus Hunyadi. Taking advantage of their resentment, the King had the Hunyadi brothers imprisoned in Buda on 14 March 1457; Ladislaus was beheaded two days later on 16 March after the royal council condemned him and his brother to death for high treason.

Matthias was held in captivity in a small house in Buda. His mother and her brother Michael Szilágyi staged a rebellion against the King and occupied large territories in the regions to the east of the river Tisza. King Ladislaus fled to Vienna in mid-1457, and from Vienna to Prague in September, taking Matthias with him. The civil war between the rebels and the barons loyal to the monarch continued until the sudden death of the young King on 23 November 1457. Thereafter the Hussite Regent of Bohemia, George of Poděbrady, held Matthias captive.

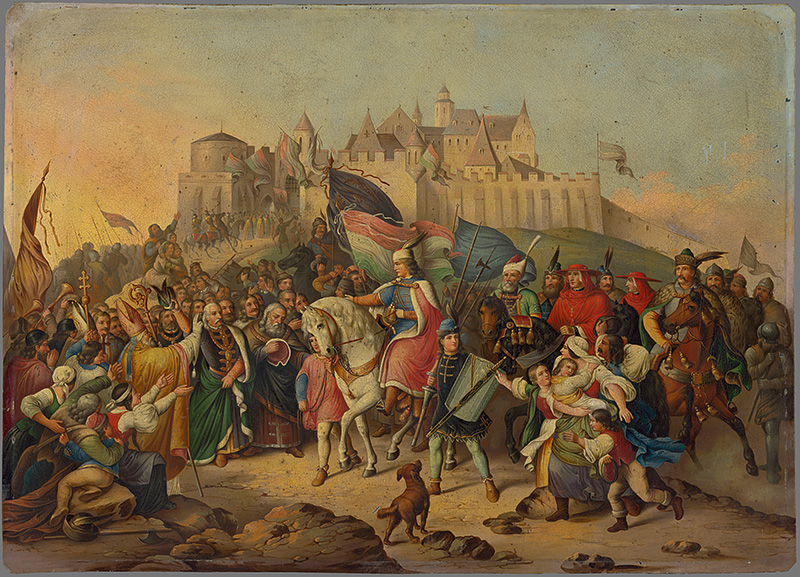
King Matthias' arrival in Buda – a painting by Henrik Weber

=== Election as king (1457–1458) ===
King Ladislaus died childless in 1457. His elder sister, Anna, and her husband, William III, Landgrave of Thuringia, laid claim to his inheritance but received no support from the Estates. The Diet of Hungary was convoked in Pest to elect a new king in January. Pope Calixtus III's legate Cardinal Juan Carvajal, who had been John Hunyadi's admirer, began openly campaigning for Matthias.

The election of Matthias as king was the only way of avoiding a protracted civil war. Ladislaus Garai was the first baron to yield. At a meeting with Matthias's mother and uncle, he promised that he and his allies would promote Matthias's election, and Michael Szilágyi promised that his nephew would never seek vengeance for Ladislaus Hunyadi's execution. They also agreed that Matthias would marry the Palatine's daughter Anna, his executed brother's bride.

Michael Szilágyi arrived at the Diet with 15,000 troops, intimidating the barons who assembled in Buda. Stirred up by Szilágyi, the noblemen gathered on the frozen River Danube and unanimously proclaimed the 14-year-old Matthias king on 24 January 1458. At the same time, the Diet elected his uncle as regent.

== Reign ==
=== Early rule and consolidation (1458–1464) ===
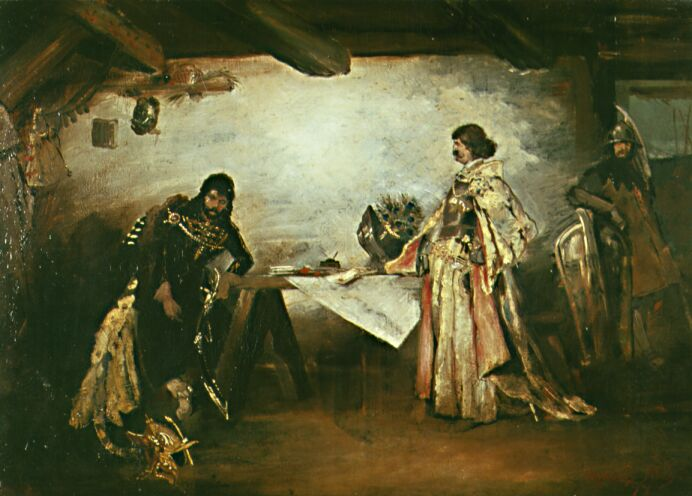
George of Poděbrady and Matthias Corvinus, a painting by Mikoláš Aleš

Matthias's election was the first time that a member of the nobility mounted the royal throne in Hungary. Michael Szilágyi sent John Vitéz to Prague to discuss the terms of Matthias's release with George of Poděbrady. Poděbrady, whose daughter Katalin Matthias promised to marry, agreed to release his future son-in-law for a ransom of 60,000 gold florins. Matthias was surrendered to the Hungarian delegates in Strážnice on 9 February 1458. With Poděbrady's mediation, he was reconciled with John Jiskra of Brandýs, the commander of the Czech mercenaries who dominated most of Upper Hungary.

Matthias made his state entry into Buda five days later. He ceremoniously sat on the throne in the Church of Our Lady, but was not crowned, because the Holy Crown of Hungary had been in the possession of Frederick III, Holy Roman Emperor for almost two decades. The 14-year-old monarch administered state affairs independently from the outset, although he reaffirmed his uncle's position as Regent. For instance, Matthias instructed the citizens of Nagyszeben (now Sibiu in Romania) to reconcile their differences with Vlad Dracula, Prince of Wallachia on 3 March 1458.

Jiskra was the first baron who turned against Matthias. He offered the throne to Casimir IV of Poland, the husband of King Ladislaus V's younger sister Elisabeth, in late March but the General sejm of Poland rejected his offer. Matthias's commander Sebastian Rozgonyi defeated Jiskra's soldiers at Sárospatak but the Ottomans' invasion of Serbia in April forced Matthias to conclude an armistice with the Czechs. They were allowed to keep Sáros Castle (now Šariš Castle, Slovakia) and other fortified places in Upper Hungary. Matthias sent two prelates, August Salánki, Bishop of Győr, and Vincent Szilasi, Bishop of Vác, to Prague to crown George of Poděbrady king. Upon their demand, the "heretic" Poděbrady swore loyalty to the Holy See.

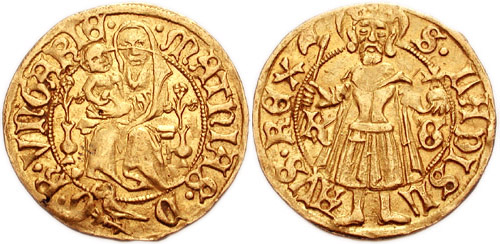
Matthias's golden florin depicting Madonna and Child, and King Saint Ladislaus

The Estates in Pest passed almost 50 decrees after assembling in May, and these were ratified by Matthias, instead of the Regent, on 8 June 1458. One decree prescribed that the King "must call and hold, and order to be held, a diet of all the gentlemen of the realm in person" every year on Whitsunday. Matthias held more than 25 Diets during his reign and convoked the Estates more frequently than his predecessors, especially between 1458 and 1476. The Diets were controlled by the barons, whom Matthias appointed and dismissed at will. For instance, he dismissed Palatine Ladislaus Garai and persuaded Michael Szilágyi to resign from the Regency after they entered into a league in the summer of 1458. The King appointed Michael Ország, who had been his father's close supporter, as the new Palatine. Most of Matthias's barons were descended from old aristocratic families but he also promoted the careers of members of the lesser nobility, or even of skilful commoners. For instance, the noble Zápolya brothers Emeric and Stephen owed their fortunes to Matthias's favour.

Matthias's ordinary revenues amounted around 250,000 golden florins per year when his reign began. A decree passed at the Diet of 1458 explicitly prohibited the imposition of extraordinary taxes. However, an extraordinary tax, one golden florin per each porta or peasant household, was levied late that year. The Ottomans occupied the fort of Golubac in Serbia in August 1458; Matthias ordered the mobilization of all noblemen. He made a raid into Ottoman territory and defeated the enemy forces in minor skirmishes. King Stephen Thomas of Bosnia accepted Matthias's suzerainty. Matthias authorized his new vassal's son Stephen Tomašević to take possession of the parts of Serbia that had not been occupied by the Ottomans.

At the turn of 1458 and 1459, Matthias held a Diet at Szeged to prepare for a war against the Ottoman Empire. However, gossip about a conspiracy compelled him to return to Buda. The rumours proved to be true because at least 30 barons, including Ladislaus Garai, Nicholas Újlaki, and Ladislaus Kanizsai, met in Németújvár (now Güssing in Austria) and offered the throne to Emperor Frederick III on 17 February 1459. Even George of Poděbrady turned against Matthias when Frederick promised him to make him governor of the Holy Roman Empire. Although the joint troops of the Emperor and the rebellious lords defeated a royal army at Körmend on 27 March, Garai had by that time died, Újlaki and Sigismund Szentgyörgyvölgyi soon entered into negotiations with Matthias' envoys. Újlaki became indifferent, Szentgyörgyvölgyi joined to Matthias. Skirmishes along the western borderlands lasted for several months, preventing Matthias from providing military assistance to Tomašević against the Ottomans. The latter took Smederevo on 29 June 1459, completing the conquest of Serbia.

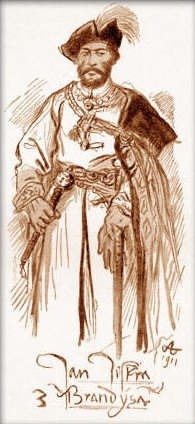
John Jiskra of Brandýs, a picture by Mikoláš Aleš

Jiskra swore an oath of loyalty to Emperor Frederick on 10 March 1460. Pope Pius II offered to mediate a peace treaty between the Emperor and Matthias. George of Poděbrady also realised he needed to support Matthias or at least had to be indifferent. He offered assistance by sending his daughter to Buda. The representatives of the Emperor and Matthias signed a truce in Olomouc in April 1460. The Pope soon offered financial support for an anti-Ottoman campaign. However, John Jiskra returned from Poland, renewing the armed conflicts with Czech mercenaries in early 1460. Matthias seized a newly-erected fort from the Czechs but he could not force them to obey him. The costs of his five-month-long campaign in Upper Hungary were paid for by an extraordinary tax.

Matthias entered into an alliance with the Emperor's rebellious brother Albert VI, Archduke of Austria. George of Poděbrady sided with the Emperor although the marriage of his daughter, who became known as Catherine in Hungary, to Matthias was celebrated on 1 May 1461 (married 1461 to 1464). Relations between Matthias and his father-in-law deteriorated because of the Czech mercenaries' continued presence in Upper Hungary. Matthias launched a new campaign against them after the Diet authorized him to collect an extraordinary tax in mid-1461. However, he did not defeat Jiskra, who even captured Késmárk (now Kežmarok, Slovakia).

The envoys of Matthias and Emperor Frederick agreed the terms of peace treaty on 3 April 1462. According to the agreement, the Emperor was to return the Holy Crown of Hungary for 80,000 golden florins, but his right to use the title King of Hungary along with Matthias was confirmed. In accordance with the treaty, the Emperor adopted Matthias, which granted him the right to succeed his "son" if Matthias died without a legitimate heir. Within a month, Jiskra yielded to Matthias. He surrendered all the forts he held in Upper Hungary to the King's representatives; as compensation, he received a large domain near the Tisza and Arad and 25,000 golden florins. That happened before the peace treaty with Frederick. To pay the large amounts stipulated in his treaties with the Emperor and Jiskra, Matthias collected an extraordinary tax with the consent of the Royal Council. The Diet, which assembled in mid-1462, confirmed this decision but only after 9 prelates and 19 barons promised that no extraordinary taxes would be introduced thereafter. Through hiring mercenaries among Jiskra's companions, Matthias began organizing a professional army, which became known as the "Black Army" in following decades. The peace treaty made in Wiener-Neustadt 19 July 1463.

Ottoman Sultan Mehmed II invaded Wallachia in early 1462. He did not conquer the country but the Wallachian boyars dethroned the anti-Ottoman Vlad Dracula and replaced him with the Sultan's favorite, Radu the Fair. The new Prince was willing to grant concessions to the Transylvanian Saxon merchants, who had come into bitter conflict with Vlad Dracula. The latter sought assistance from Matthias and they met in Brassó (now Brașov, Romania) in November. However, the Saxons presented Matthias with a letter that was allegedly written by Vlad Dracula to Sultan Mehmed in which the Prince offered his support to the Ottomans. Convinced of Vlad Dracula's treachery, Matthias had him imprisoned.

In preparation for a war against the Ottomans, Matthias held a Diet at Tolna in March 1463. Although the Estates authorized him to levy an extraordinary tax of one florin, he did not intervene when Mehmed II invaded Bosnia in June. In a month, the Ottomans murdered King Stephen Tomašević and conquered the whole country. Matthias adopted an offensive foreign policy only after the terms of his peace with Emperor Frederick had been ratified in Wiener Neustadt on 19 July 1463. He led his troops to Bosnia and conquered Jajce and other forts in its northern parts. The conquered regions were organized into new defensive provinces, the banates of Jajce and Srebrenik. Matthias was assisted by Stjepan Vukčić Kosača, Grand Duke of Bosnia, who controlled the area of modern and Old Hercegovina. A former vassal to the Bosnian kings, Stjepan accepted Matthias's suzerainty.

Queen Catherine died in early 1464 during preparations for her husband's coronation with the Holy Crown, which had been returned by Emperor Frederick. The ceremony was carried out in full accordance with the customary law of Hungary on 29 March 1464; Archbishop of Esztergom Dénes Szécsi ceremoniously put the Holy Crown on Matthias's head in Székesfehérvár. At the Diet assembled on this occasion, the newly crowned King confirmed the liberties of the nobility. Hereafter the legality of Matthias's reign could not be questioned.

=== First reforms and internal conflicts (1464–1467) ===
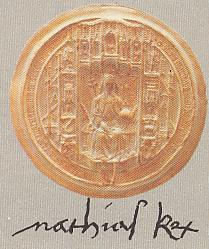
Matthias's signature and royal seal

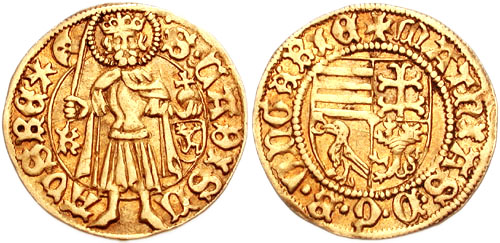
Matthias's golden florin depicting King Saint Ladislaus and Matthias's coat-of-arms

==== Political reforms ====
Matthias dismissed his Chief Chancellor Archbishop Szécsi, replacing him with Stephen Várdai, Archbishop of Kalocsa, and John Vitéz. Both prelates bore the title of Chief and Secret Chancellor, but Várdai was the actual leader of the Royal Chancery. Around the same time, Matthias united the superior courts of justice, the Court of Royal Special Presence and the Court of Personal Presence, into one supreme court. The new supreme court diminished the authority of the traditional courts presided over by the barons and contributed to the professionalization of the administration of justice. He appointed Albert Hangácsi, Bishop of Csanád as the first Chief Justice.

Sultan Mehmed II returned to Bosnia and laid siege to Jajce in July 1464. Matthias began assembling his troops along the River Sava, forcing the Sultan to raise the siege on 24 August 1464. Matthias and his army crossed the river and seized Srebrenica. He also besieged Zvornik, but the arrival of a large Ottoman army forced him to withdraw to Hungary. The following year, Matthias forced Stefan Vukčić, who had transferred Makarska Krajina to the Republic of Venice, to establish Hungarian garrisons in his forts along the river Neretva.

Dénes Szécsi died in 1465 and John Vitéz became the new Archbishop of Esztergom. Matthias replaced the two Voivodes of Transylvania (Nicholas Újlaki and John Pongrác of Dengeleg) with Counts Sigismund and John Szentgyörgyi, and Bertold Ellerbach. Although Újlaki preserved his office of Ban of Macsó, the King appointed Peter Szokoli to administer the province together with the old Ban.

Matthias convoked the Diet to make preparations for an anti-Ottoman campaign in 1466. For the same purpose, he received subsidies from Pope Paul II. However, Matthias had realized that no substantial aid could be expected from the Christian powers and tacitly gave up his anti-Ottoman foreign policy. He did not invade Ottoman territory and the Ottomans did not make major incursions into Hungary, implying that he signed a peace treaty with Mehmed II's envoy who arrived in Hungary in 1465.

Matthias visited Slavonia and dismissed the two Bans Nicholas Újlaki and Emeric Zápolya, replacing them with Jan Vitovec and John Tuz in 1466. Early the following year, he mounted a campaign in Upper Hungary against a band of Czech mercenaries who were under the command of Ján Švehla and had seized Kosztolány (now Veľké Kostoľany in Slovakia). Matthias routed them and had Švehla and his 150 comrades hanged.

==== Economic reforms ====
At the Diet of March 1467, two traditional taxes were renamed; the chamber's profit was thereafter collected as tax of the royal treasury and the thirtieth as the Crown's customs. Because of this change, all previous tax exemptions became void, increasing state revenues. Matthias set about centralizing the administration of royal revenues. He entrusted the administration of the Crown's customs to John Ernuszt, a converted Jewish merchant. Within two years, Ernuszt was responsible for the collection of all ordinary and extraordinary taxes, and the management of the salt mines.

==== The Transylvanian revolt and Matthias's campaign in Moldavia ====
Matthias's tax reform caused a revolt in Transylvania. The representatives of the "Three Nations" of the province (the noblemen, the Saxons and the Székelys) formed an alliance against the King in Kolozsmonostor (now Mănăștur district in Cluj-Napoca, Romania) on 18 August 1467, stating that they were willing to fight for the freedom of Hungary. Matthias assembled his troops immediately and hastened to the province. The rebels surrendered without resistance but Matthias severely punished their leaders, many of whom were impaled, beheaded, or mercilessly tortured upon his orders. Suspecting that Stephen the Great had supported the rebellion, Matthias invaded Moldavia. On the night of December 15, the troops of Stephen the Great initiated a [surprise attack on the Hungarian forces encamped in the town of Baia. The initial phase of the attack resulted in significant casualties for the Hungarian forces. However, Matthias counterattacked, forcing Stephen to retreat. Three days following the Battle of Baia, the Hungarian army returned to Hungary, due to Matthias's severe injury during combat.

=== War for the Lands of the Bohemian Crown (1468–1479) ===
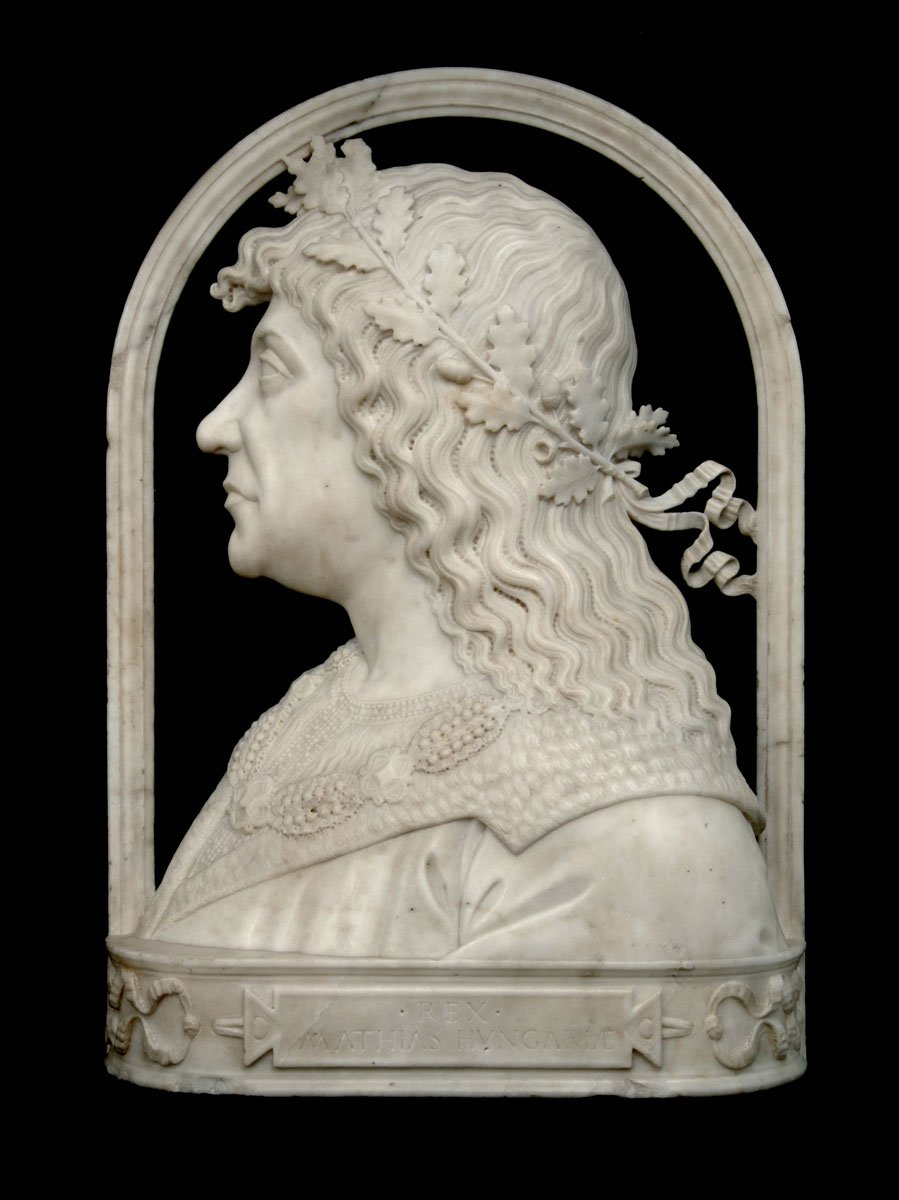
Renaissance portrait of Matthias Corvinus, King of Hungary, (marble relief by Giovanni Dalmata (attributed to), Benedetto da Maiano (previous attribution) 1476)

Matthias's former brother-in-law Victor of Poděbrady invaded Austria in early 1468. Emperor Frederick appealed to Matthias for support, hinting at the possibility of Matthias's election as King of the Romans, the first step towards the imperial throne. Matthias declared war on Victor's father, King George of Bohemia, on 31 March 1468. He said he also wanted to help the Czech Catholic lords against their "heretic monarch", whom the Pope had excommunicated. Matthias expelled the Czech troops from Austria and invaded Moravia and Silesia. He took an active part in the fighting; he was injured during the siege of Třebíč in May 1468 and was captured at Chrudim while spying out the enemy camp in disguise in February 1469. On the latter occasion, he was released because he made his custodians believe he was a local Czech groom.

The Diet of 1468 authorized Matthias to levy an extraordinary tax to finance the new war but only after 8 prelates and 13 secular lords pledged on the King's behalf that he would not demand such charges in the future. Matthias also exercised royal prerogatives to increase his revenues. For instance, he ordered a Palatine's eyre in a county, the cost of which were to be covered by the local inhabitants, but he soon authorised the county to redeem the cancellation of the irksome duty.

The Czech Catholics, who were led by Zdeněk of Šternberk, joined forces with Matthias in February 1469. Their united troops were encircled at Vilémov by George of Poděbrady's army. In fear of being captured, Matthias opened negotiations with his former father-in-law. They met in a nearby hovel in which Matthias persuaded George of Poděbrady to sign an armistice promising that he would mediate a reconciliation between the moderate Hussites and the Holy See. Their next meeting took place in Olomouc in April. Here the papal legates came forward with demands including the appointment of a Catholic Archbishop to the See of Prague, which could not be accepted by George of Poděbrady.

The Czech Catholic Estates elected Matthias King of Bohemia in Olomouc on 3 May 1469 but he was never crowned. Moravia, Silesia and Lusatia soon accepted his rule but Bohemia proper remained faithful to George of Poděbrady. The Estates of Bohemia even acknowledged the right of Vladislaus Jagiello, the eldest son of Casimir IV of Poland, to succeed king George of Poděbrady.

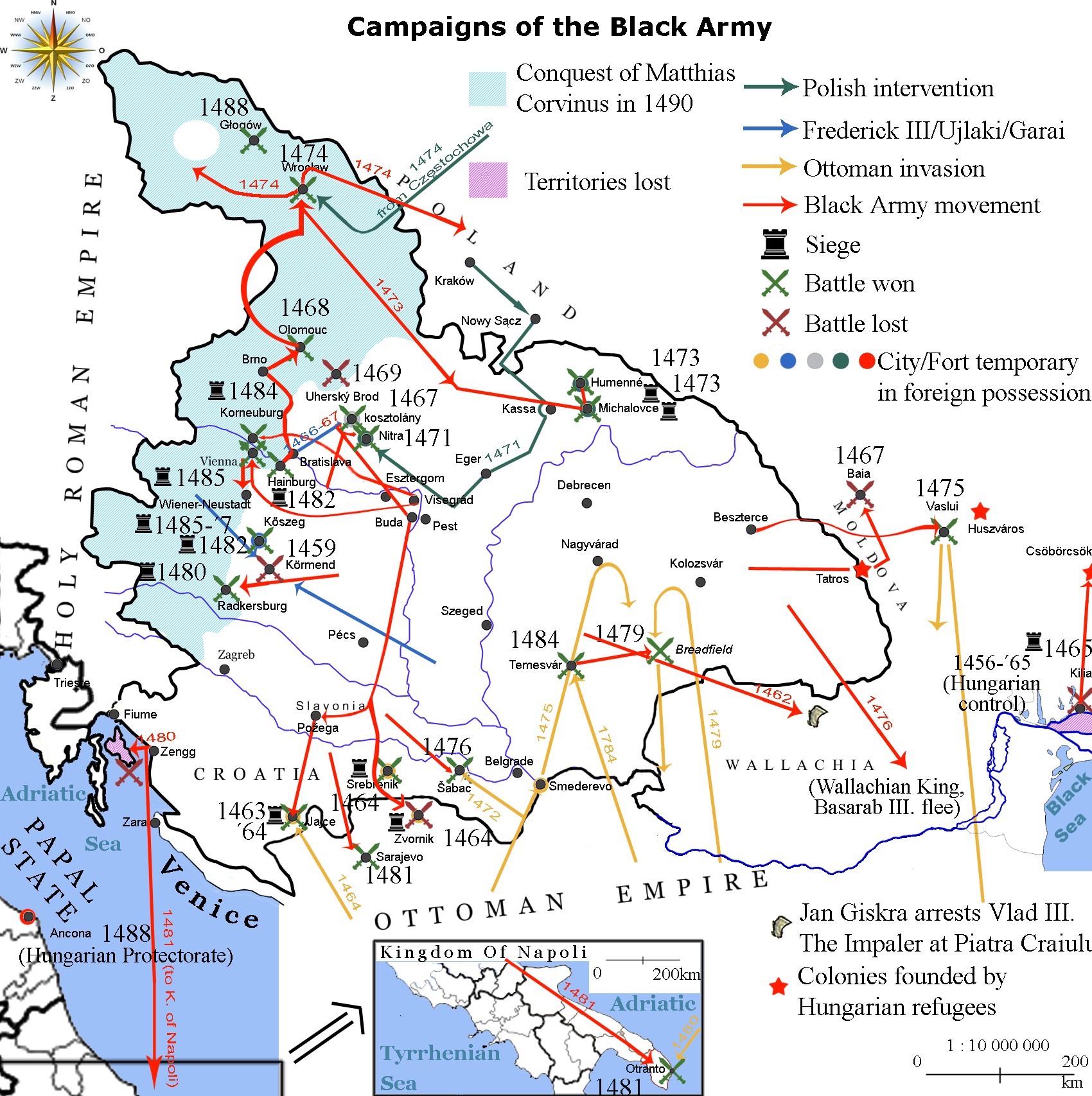
Conquests of Matthias Corvinus in Central Europe

Matthias's relations with Frederick III had in the meantime deteriorated because the Emperor accused Matthias of allowing the Ottomans to march through Slavonia when raiding the Emperor's realms. The Frangepan family, whose domains in Croatia were exposed to Ottoman raids, entered into negotiations with the Emperor and the Republic of Venice. In 1469, Matthias sent an army to Croatia to prevent the Venetians from seizing the Adriatic coastal town Senj.

Matthias expelled George of Poděbrady's troops from Silesia. Matthias's army was encircled and routed at Uherský Brod on 2 November 1489, forcing him to withdraw to Hungary. Matthias soon ordered the collection of an extraordinary tax without holding a Diet, raising widespread discontent among the Hungarian Estates. He visited Emperor Frederick in Vienna on 11 February 1470, hoping the Emperor would contribute to the costs of the war against Poděbrady. Although the negotiations lasted for a month, no compromise was worked out. The Emperor also refused to commit himself to promoting Matthias's election as King of the Romans. After a month, Matthias left Vienna without taking formal leave of Frederick III.

Having realised the Hungarian Estates' growing dissatisfaction, Matthias held a Diet in November 1470. The Diet again authorized him to levy an extraordinary tax, stipulating that the sum of all taxes payable per porta could not exceed one florin. The Estates also made it clear that they opposed the war in Bohemia. George of Poděbrady died on 22 March 1471. The Diet of Bohemia proper elected Vladislaus Jagiello king on 27 May 1471. The papal legate Lorenzo Roverella soon declared Vladislaus's election void and confirmed Matthias's position as King of Bohemia, but the Imperial Diet refused Matthias's claim.

Matthias was staying in Moravia when he was informed that a group of Hungarian prelates and barons had offered the throne to Casimir, a younger son of King Casimir IV of Poland. The conspiracy was initiated by Archbishop John Vitéz and his nephew Janus Pannonius, Bishop of Pécs, who opposed war against the Catholic Vladislaus Jagiellon. Initially, their plan was supported by the majority of the Estates, but nobody dared to rebel against Matthias, enabling him to return to Hungary without resistance. Matthias held a Diet and promised to refrain from levying taxes without the consent of the Estates and to convoke the Diet in each year. His promises remedied most of the Estates' grievances and almost 50 barons and prelates confirmed their loyalty to him on 21 September 1471. Casimir Jagiellon invaded on 2 October 1471. With Bishop Janus Pannonius's support, he seized Nyitra (now Nitra in Slovakia), but only two barons, John Rozgonyi and Nicholas Perényi, joined him. Within five months Prince Casimir withdrew from Hungary, Bishop Janus Pannonius died while fleeing, and Archbishop John Vitéz was forbidden to leave his see. Matthias appointed the Silesian Johann Beckensloer to administer the Archdiocese of Esztergom. Vitéz died and Beckensloer succeeded him in a year.

The Ottomans had meanwhile seized the Hungarian forts along the river Nertva. Matthias nominated the wealthy baron Nicholas Újlaki as King of Bosnia in 1471, entrusting the defence of the province to him. Uzun Hassan, head of the Aq Qoyunlu Turkmens, proposed an anti-Ottoman alliance to Matthias but he refrained from attacking the Ottoman Empire. Matthias supported the Austrian noblemen who rebelled against Emperor Frederick in 1472. The following year, Matthias, Casimir IV and Vladislaus entered into negotiations on the terms of a peace treaty, but the discussions lasted for months. Matthias tried to unify the government of Silesia, which consisted of dozens of smaller duchies, through appointing a captain-general. However, the Estates refused to elect his candidate Duke Frederick I of Liegnitz.

Matthias's great coat-of-arms. In the middle are personal coat of arms of Matthias Corvinus (Quartered: 1. Hungary's two-barred cross, 2. Árpád dynasty, 3. Bohemia, and 4. Hunyadi family) and that of his wife Beatrice of Naples (Quartered: 1. and 4. Arpad dynasty – France ancient – Jerusalem Impaled; 2. and 3. Aragon), above them a royal crown. On the outer edge there are coat of arms of various lands, beginning from the top clockwise they are: Bohemia, Luxemburg, Lower Lusatia, Moravia, Austria, Galicia–Volhynia, Silesia, Dalmatia-Croatia, Beszterce county

Ali Bey Mihaloğlu, Bey of Smederevo, pillaged eastern parts of Hungary, destroyed Várad, and took 16,000 prisoners with him in January 1474. The next month, the envoys of Matthias and Casimir IV signed a peace treaty and a three-year truce between Matthias and Vladislaus Jagiellon was also declared. Within a month, however, Vladislaus entered into an alliance with Emperor Frederick and Casimir IV joined them. Casimir IV and Vladislaus invaded Silesia and laid siege to Matthias in Breslau (now Wrocław in Poland) in October. He prevented the besiegers from accumulating provisions, forcing them to raise the siege. Thereafter the Silesian Estates willingly elected Matthias's new candidate Stephen Zápolya as captain-general. The Moravian Estates elected Ctibor Tovačovský as captain-general. Matthias confirmed this decision, although Tovačovský had been Vladislaus Jagiellon's partisan.

The Ottomans invaded Wallachia and Moldavia at the end of 1474. Matthias sent reinforcements under the command of Blaise Magyar to Stephen the Great. Their united forces routed the invaders in the Battle of Vaslui on 10 January 1475. Fearing a new Ottoman invasion, the Prince of Moldavia swore fealty to Matthias on 15 August 1475. Sultan Mehmed II proposed peace but Matthias refused him. Instead, he stormed into Ottoman territory and captured Šabac, an important fort on the river Száva, on 15 February 1476. During the siege, Matthias barely escaped capture while he was watching the fortress from a boat.

For unknown reasons, Archbishop Johann Beckensloer left Hungary, taking the treasury of the Esztergom See with him in early 1476. He fled to Vienna and offered his funds to the Emperor. Matthias accused the Emperor of having incited the Archbishop against him.

Mehmed II launched a campaign against Moldavia in the summer. Although he won the Battle of Valea Albă on 26 July 1476, the lack of provisions forced him to retreat. Matthias sent auxiliary troops to Moldavia under the command of Vlad Dracula, whom he had released, and Stephen Báthory The allied forces defeated an Ottoman army at the Siret River in August. With Hungarian and Moldavian support, Vlad Dracula was reinstalled as Prince of Wallachia but he was killed fighting against his opponent Basarab Laiotă.

Matthias's bride Beatrice of Naples arrived in Hungary in late 1476. Matthias married her in Buda on 22 December 1476. The Queen soon established a rigid etiquette, making direct contacts between the King and his subjects more difficult. According to Bonfini, Matthias also "improved his board and manner of life, introduced sumptuous banquets, disdaining humility at home and beautified the dining rooms" after his marriage. According to a contemporaneous record, around that time Matthias's revenues amounted about 500,000 florins, half of which derived from the tax of the royal treasury and the extraordinary tax.

Matthias concluded an alliance with the Teutonic Knights and the Bishopric of Ermland against Poland in March 1477. However, instead of Poland, he declared war on Emperor Frederick after he learnt that the Emperor had confirmed Vladislaus Jagiellon's position as King of Bohemia and Prince-elector. Matthias invaded Lower Austria and imposed a blockade on Vienna. Vladislaus Jagiellon denied to support the Emperor, forcing him to seek reconciliation with Matthias. With the mediation of Pope Sixtus IV, Venice, and Ferdinand I of Naples, Matthias concluded a peace treaty with Frederick III, which was signed on 1 December 1477. The Emperor promised to confirm Matthias as the lawful ruler of Bohemia and to pay him an indemnity of 100,000 florins. They met in Korneuburg where Frederick III installed Matthias as King of Bohemia and Matthias swore loyalty to the Emperor.

Negotiations between the envoys of Matthias and Vladislaus Jagiellon accelerated during the next few months. The first draft of a treaty was agreed upon on 28 March 1478, and the text was completed by the end of 1477. The treaty authorized both monarchs to use the title of King of Bohemia although Vladislaus could omit to style Matthias as such in their correspondence, and the Lands of the Bohemian Crown were divided between them. Vladislaus ruled in Bohemia proper and Matthias in Moravia, Silesia and Lusatia. They solemnly ratified the peace treaty at their meeting in Olomouc on 21 July 1478.

=== War for Austria (1479–1487) ===
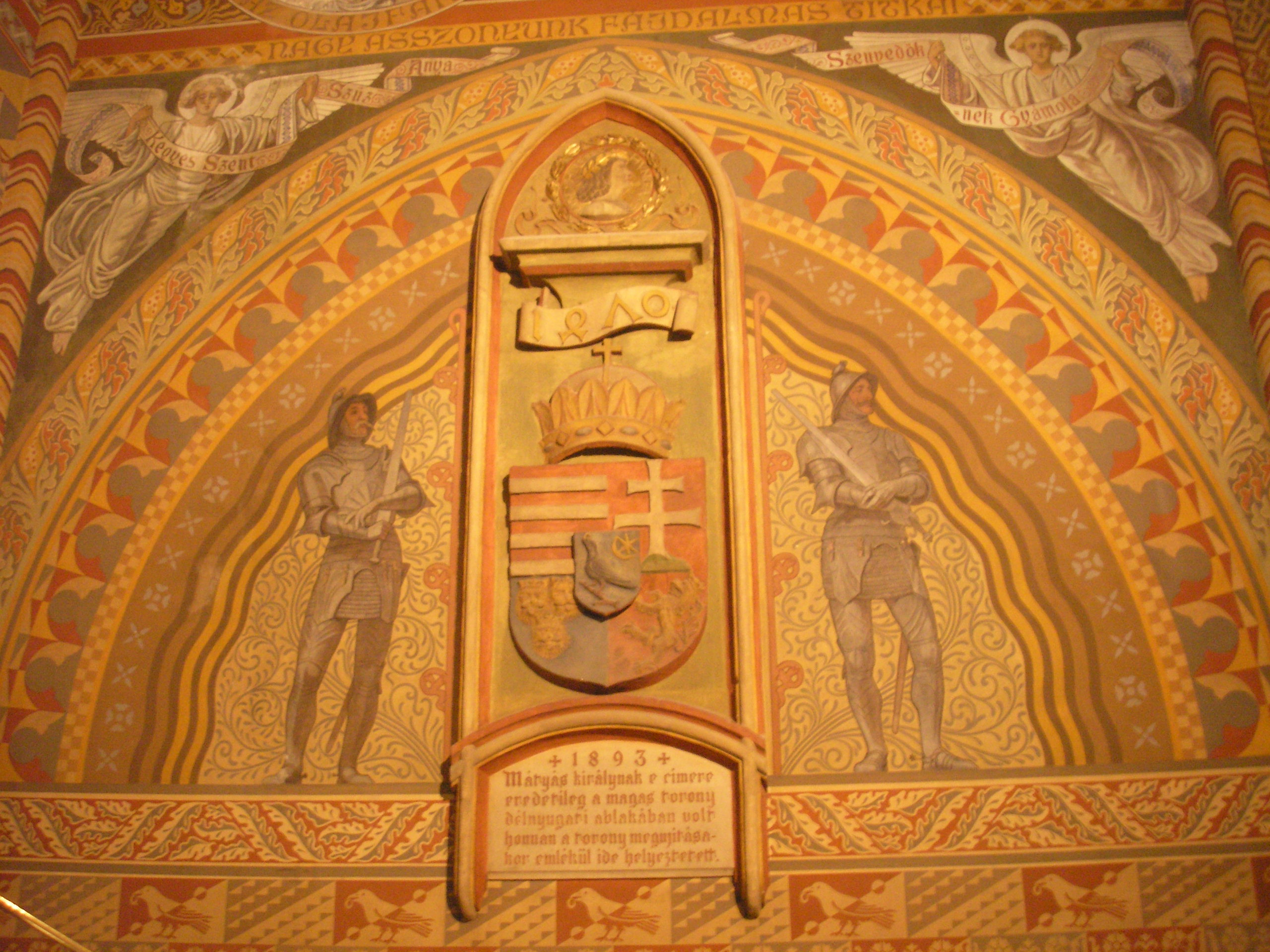
Coat of arms of Matthias Corvinus, guarded by Black Army heavy infantry. Matthias Church, Budapest. The damaged art relic was renovated in 1893.

Emperor Frederick only paid off half of the indemnity due to Matthias according to their treaty of 1477. Matthias concluded a treaty with the Swiss Confederacy on 26 March 1479, hindering the recruitment of Swiss mercenaries by the Emperor. He also entered into an alliance with Archbishop of Salzburg Bernhard II of Rohr, who allowed him to take possession of the fortresses of the Archbishopric in Carinthia, Carniola and Styria.

An Ottoman army supported by Basarab Țepeluș of Wallachia invaded Transylvania and set fire to Szászváros (now Orăștie in Romania) in late 1479. Stephen Báthory and Paul Kinizsi annihilated the marauders in the Battle of Breadfield on 13 October 1479. Matthias united the command of all forts along the Danube to the west of Belgrade in the hand of Paul Kinizsi to improve the defence of the southern frontier. Matthias sent reinforcements to Stephen the Great, who invaded pro-Ottoman Wallachia in early 1480; Matthias launched a campaign as far as Sarajevo in Bosnia in November. He set up five defensive provinces, or banates, centred around the forts of Szörényvár (now Drobeta-Turnu Severin in Romania), Belgrade, Šabac, Srebrenik, and Jajce. The next year, Matthias initiated a criminal case against the Frankapans, the Zrinskis and other leading Croatian and Slavonian magnates for their alleged participation in the 1471 conspiracy. Most barons were pardoned as soon as they consented to the introduction of a new land tax. In 1481, for a loan of 100,000 florins, Matthias seized the town of Mautern in Styria and Sankt Pölten in Lower Austria from Friedrich Mauerkircher, one of the two candidates to the Bishopric of Passau.

Sultan Mehmed II died on 3 May 1481. A civil war ensued in the Ottoman Empire between his sons Bayezid II and Cem. Defeated, Cem fled to Rhodes, where the Knights Hospitaller kept him in custody. Matthias claimed Cem's custody in the hope of using him to gain concessions from Bayezid, but Venice and Pope Innocent VIII strongly opposed this plan. In late 1481, Hungarian auxiliary troops supported Matthias's father-in-law Ferdinand I of Naples to reoccupy Otranto, which had been lost to the Ottomans the year before.

Although the "Black Army" had already laid siege to Hainburg an der Donau in January 1482, Matthias officially declared a new war on Emperor Frederick three months later. He directed the siege in person from the end of June and the town fell to him in October. In the next three months, Matthias also captured Sankt Veit an der Glan, Enzersdorf an der Fischa, and Kőszeg. The papal legate, Bartolomeo Maraschi tried to mediate a peace treaty between Matthias and the Emperor, but Matthias refused. Instead, he signed a five-year truce with Sultan Bayezid.

Matthias's marriage to Beatrice of Naples did not produce sons; he tried to strengthen the position of his illegitimate son John Corvinus. The child received Sáros Castle and inherited the extensive domains of his grandmother Elizabeth Szilágyi with his father's consent. Matthias also forced Victor of Poděbrady to renounce the Duchy of Troppau in Silesia in favour of John Corvinus in 1485. Queen Beatrice opposed Matthias's favouritism towards his son. Even so, Matthias nominated her eight-year-old nephew Ippolito d'Este Archbishop of Esztergom. The Pope refused to confirm the child's appointment for years. The "Black Army" encircled Vienna in January 1485. The siege lasted for five months and ended with the triumphal entry of Matthias, at the head of 8,000 veterans, into Vienna on 1 June 1485. The King soon moved the royal court to the newly conquered town. He summoned the Estates of Lower Austria to Vienna and forced them to swear loyalty to him.

Matthias, by the grace of God, king of Hungary, Bohemia, Dalmatia, Croatia, Rama, Serbia, Galicia, Lodomeria, Cumania, and Bulgaria, Duke of Silesia and Luxemburg and Margrave of Moravia and Lusatia, for the everlasting memory of the matter. It is fitting that kings and princes who by heavenly decree are placed at the summit of the highest office, be adorned not only by arms but also by laws and that the people subjected to them, as well as the reins of authority, are restrained by the strength of good and stable institutions rather than by the harshness of absolute power and reprehensible abuse.

— Preamble to the Decretum Maius

Upon the monarch's initiative, the Diet of 1485 passed the so-called Decretum maius, a systematic law-code which replaced many previous contradictory decrees. The law-code introduced substantial reforms in the administration of justice; the Palatine's eyre and the extraordinary county assemblies were abolished, which strengthened the position of the county courts. Matthias also decreed that in cases of the monarch's absence or minority, the Palatine was authorized to rule as Regent.

Emperor Frederick persuaded six of the seven Prince-electors of the Holy Roman Empire to proclaim his son Maximilian King of the Romans on 16 February 1486. The Emperor, however, had failed to invite the King of Bohemia, either Matthias or Vladislaus Jagiellon, to the assembly. In an attempt to prevail on Vladislaus to protest, Matthias invited him to a personal meeting. Although they formed an alliance in Jihlava in September, the Estates of Bohemia refused to confirm it and Vladislaus recognized Maximilian's election.

In the meantime Matthias continued his war against the Emperor. The "Black Army" seized several towns in Lower Austria, including Laa an der Thaya, and Stein in 1485 and 1486. He set up his chancery for Lower Austria in 1486, but he never introduced a separate seal for this realm. Matthias assumed the title of Duke of Austria at the Diet of the Lower Austrian Estates in Ebenfurth in 1487. He appointed Stephen Zápolya captain-general, Urban Nagylucsei administrator of the Archdiocese of Vienna, and entrusted the defence of the occupied towns and forts to Hungarian and Bohemian captains, but otherwise continued to employ Emperor Frederick's officials who accepted his rule. Wiener Neustadt, the last town resisting Matthias in Lower Austria, fell to him on 17 August 1487.

He started negotiations with Duke Albert III of Saxony, who arrived at the head of the imperial army to fight for Emperor Frederick III. They signed a six-month armistice in Sankt Pölten on 16 December 1487, which ended the war. Matthias offered Emperor Frederick and his son prince Maximilian, the return of Austrian provinces and Vienna, if they would renounce the treaty of 1463 and accept Matthias as Frederick's designated heir and probable the inheritor of the title of Holy Roman Emperor. Before this was settled though, Matthias died in Vienna in 1490.

King Matthias was happy to be described as "the second Attila". The Chronica Hungarorum by Johannes Thuróczy published in 1488, set the goal of glorifying Attila, which was undeservedly neglected, moreover, he introduced the famous "Scourge of God" characterization to the later Hungarian writers, because the earlier chronicles remained hidden for a long time. Thuróczy worked hard to endear Attila, the Hun king with an effort far surpassing his predecessor chroniclers. He made Attila a model for his victorious ruler, King Matthias who had Attila's abilities, with this he almost brought "the hammer of the world" to life.

=== Last years (1487–1490) ===
Europe at the end of the reign of King Matthias

According to the contemporaneous Philippe de Commines, Matthias's subjects feared their king in the last years of his life because he rarely showed mercy towards those he suspected of treachery. He had Archbishop Peter Váradi imprisoned in 1484 and ordered the execution of Chancellor of Bohemia Jaroslav Boskovic in 1485. He also imprisoned Nicholas Bánfi, a member of a magnate family, in 1487, although he had earlier avoided punishing the old aristocracy. Bánfi's imprisonment seems to have been connected to his marriage to a daughter of John the Mad, Duke of Glogau because Matthias tried to seize this duchy for John Corvinus. John the Mad entered into an alliance with the Duke of Münsterberg Henry of Poděbrady, and declared a war on Matthias on 9 May. Six months later, the Black Army invaded and occupied his duchy.

In the meantime, the citizens of Ancona, a town in the Papal States, hoisted Matthias's flag in the hope he would protect them against Venice. Pope Innocent VIII soon protested, but Matthias refused to reject the overture and stated that the link between him and the town would never harm the interests of the Holy See. He also sent an auxiliary troop to his father-in-law, who was waging a war against the Holy See and Venice. The 1482 truce between Hungary and the Ottoman Empire was prolonged for two years in 1488. On this occasion, it was stipulated that the Ottomans were to refrain from invading Wallachia and Moldavia. The following year, Matthias granted two domains to Stephen the Great of Moldavia in Transylvania.

Matthias, who suffered from gout, could not walk and was carried in a litter after March 1489. Hereafter, his succession caused bitter conflicts between Queen Beatrice and John Corvinus. Matthias asked Beatrice's brother Alfonso, Duke of Calabria, to persuade her not to strive for the Crown and stated that the "Hungarian people are capable of killing up unto the last man rather than submit to the government of a woman". To strengthen his illegitimate son's position, Matthias even proposed withdrawing from Austria and confirming Emperor Frederick's right to succeed him if the Emperor was willing to grant Croatia and Bosnia to John Corvinus with the title of king.

Matthias participated in the lengthy Palm Sunday ceremony in Vienna in 1490 although he had felt so ill that morning that he could not eat breakfast. Around noon, he tasted a fig that proved to be rotten and he became very agitated and suddenly felt faint. The next day he was unable to speak. After two days of suffering, Matthias died in the morning of 6 April. According to Professor Frigyes Korányi, Matthias died of a stroke; Dr. Herwig Egert does not exclude the possibility of poisoning. Matthias's funeral was held in St. Stephen's Cathedral, Vienna and he was buried in Székesfehérvár Cathedral on 24 or 25 April 1490.

== Patronage ==
=== Renaissance king ===
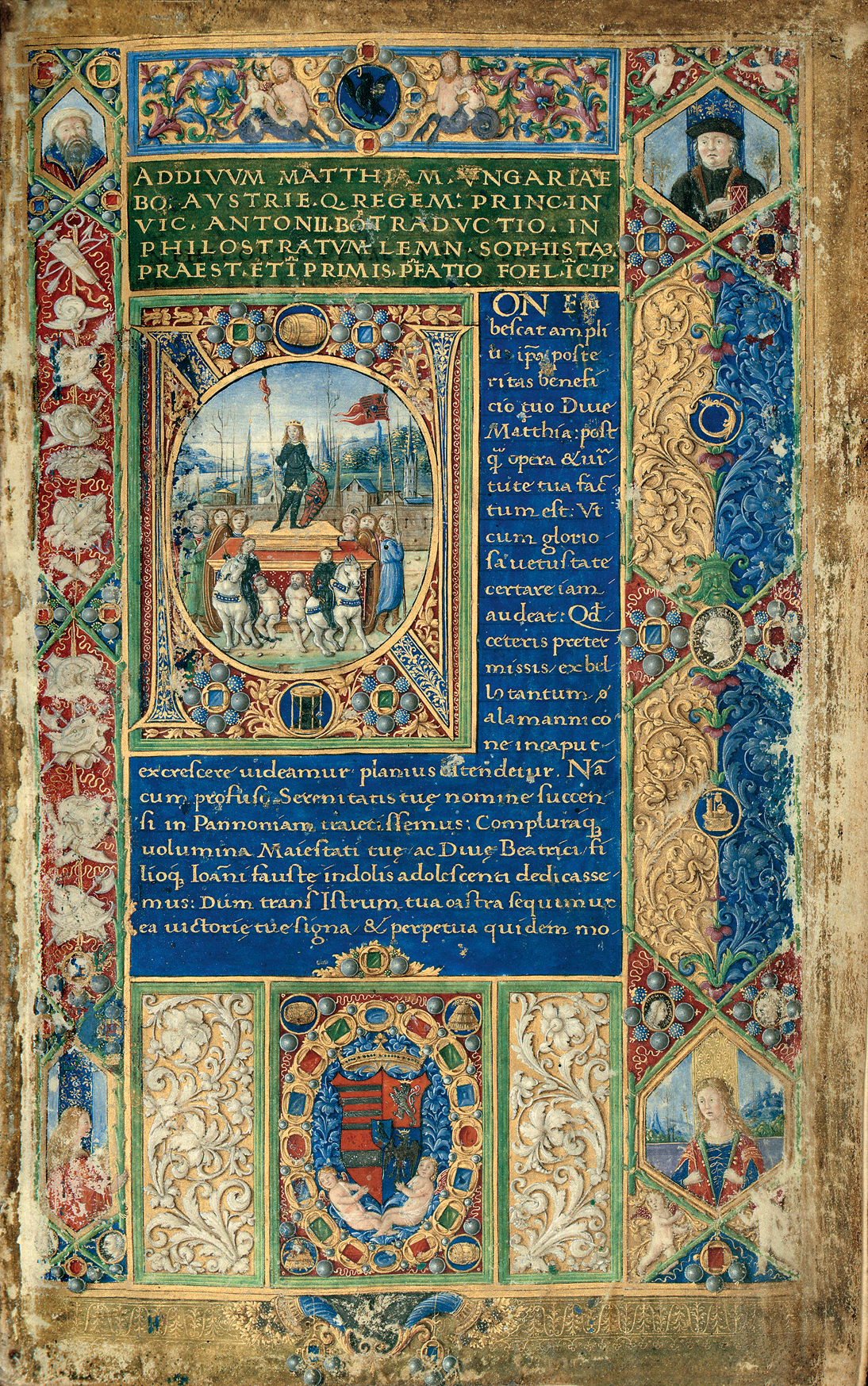
Matthias's illegitimate son, John Corvinus triumphed in Vienna in 1485

Matthias was the first non-Italian monarch promoting the spread of Renaissance style in his realm. His marriage to Beatrice of Naples strengthened the influence of contemporaneous Italian art and scholarship, and it was under his reign that Hungary became the first land outside Italy to embrace the Renaissance. The earliest appearance of Renaissance style buildings and works outside Italy were in Hungary. The Italian scholar Marsilio Ficino introduced Matthias to Plato's ideas of a philosopher-king uniting wisdom and strength in himself, which fascinated Matthias. Matthias is the main character in Aurelio Lippo Brandolini's Republics and Kingdoms Compared, a dialogue on the comparison of the two forms of government. According to Brandolini, Matthias said a monarch "is at the head of the law and rules over it" when summing up his own concepts of state.

Matthias also cultivated traditional art. Hungarian epic poems and lyric songs were often sung at his court. He was proud of his role as the defender of Roman Catholicism against the Ottomans and the Hussites. He initiated theological debates, for instance on the doctrine of the Immaculate Conception, and surpassed both the Pope and his legate "with regard to religious observance", according to the latter. Matthias issued coins in the 1460s bearing an image of the Virgin Mary, demonstrating his special devotion to her cult.

Upon Matthias's initiative, Archbishop John Vitéz and Bishop Janus Pannonius persuaded Pope Paul II to authorize them to set up a university in Pressburg (now Bratislava in Slovakia) on 29 May 1465. The Academia Istropolitana was closed shortly after the Archbishop's death. Matthias was contemplating establishing a new university in Buda but this plan was not accomplished.

=== Building projects and arts ===
Matthias started at least two major building projects. The works in Buda and Visegrád began in about 1479. Two new wings and a hanging garden were built at the royal castle of Buda, and the palace at Visegrád was rebuilt in Renaissance style. Matthias appointed the Italian Chimenti Camicia and the Dalmatian Giovanni Dalmata to direct these projects.

Matthias commissioned the leading Italian artists of his age to embellish his palaces: for instance, the sculptor Benedetto da Majano and the painters Filippino Lippi and Andrea Mantegna worked for him. A copy of Mantegna's portrait of Matthias survived. In the spring of 1485, Matthias decided to commission Leonardo da Vinci to paint a Madonna to him. Matthias also hired the Italian military engineer Aristotele Fioravanti to direct the rebuilding of the forts along the southern frontier. He had new monasteries built in Late Gothic style for the Franciscans in Kolozsvár, Szeged and Hunyad, and for the Paulines in Fejéregyháza.

The court of Matthias had a musical establishment of high quality. The master of the Papal Chapel Bartolomeo Maraschi described Matthias's chapel choir as the best he had ever heard. Composers such as Josquin Dor and Johannes de Stokem spent time in Matthias's court, and numerous Italian musicians visited it. A late remark by Pal Várdai, Archbishop of Esztergom, implies that the influential composer Josquin des Prez was active in Matthias' court for years in the 1480s, but Várdai may have mistaken him for someone else, and there is no documentary evidence that places him there.

=== Royal library ===
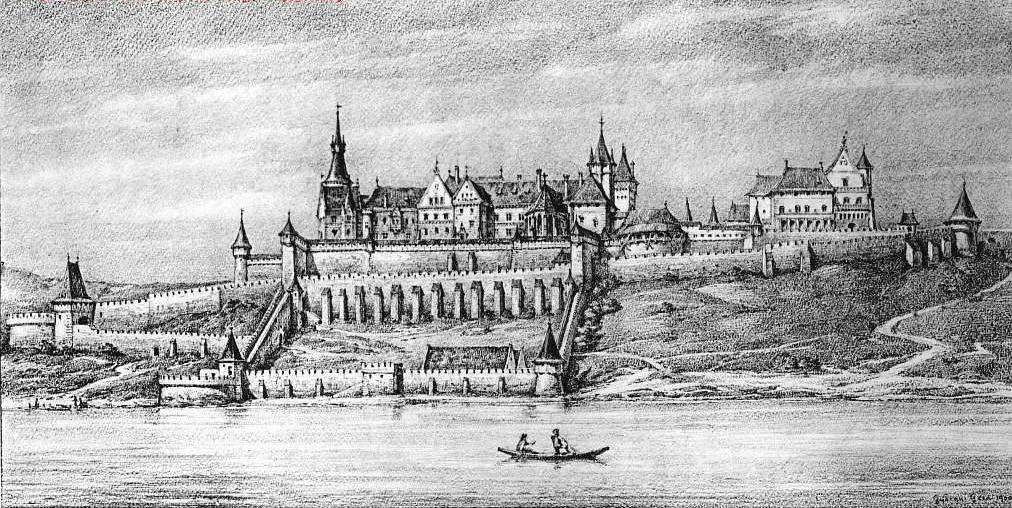
The Royal Palace in Buda, engraving from the 1480s

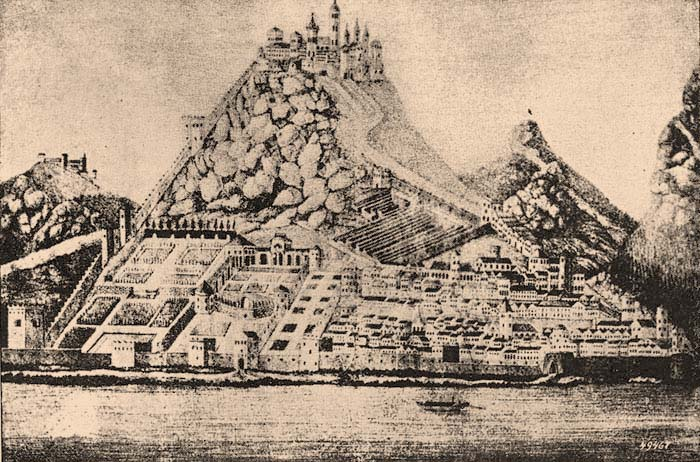
The Renaissance palaces of the summer residence at Visegrád, engraving from the 1480s

Matthias started the systematic collection of books after the arrival of his first librarian, Martius Galeotti, a friend of Janus Pannonius from Ferrara in around 1465. The exchange of letters between Taddeo Ugoleto, who succeeded Marzio in 1471, and Francesco Bandini contributed to the development of the royal library because the latter regularly informed his friend of new manuscripts. Matthias also employed scriptors, illuminators, and book-binders. Although the exact number of his books is unknown, his Bibliotheca Corviniana was one of Europe's largest collections of books when he died.

According to Marcus Tanner, the surviving 216 volumes of the King's library "show that Matthias had the literary tastes of a classic 'alpha male'", who preferred secular books to devotional works. For instance, a Latin translation of Xenophon's biography of Cyrus the Great, Quintus Curtius Rufus's book of Alexander the Great, and a military treatise by the contemporaneous Roberto Valturio survived. Matthias enjoyed reading, as demonstrated by a letter in which he thanked the Italian scholar Pomponio Leto who had sent him Silius Italicus's work of the Second Punic War.

=== Patron of scholars ===
Matthias enjoyed the company of Humanists and had lively discussions on various topics with them. The fame of his magnanimity encouraged many scholars, mostly Italians, to settle in Buda. Antonio Bonfini, Pietro Ranzano, Bartolomeo Fonzio, and Francesco Bandini spent many years in Matthias's court. This circle of educated men introduced the ideas of Neoplatonism to Hungary.

Like all intellectuals of his age, Matthias was convinced that the movements and combinations of the stars and planets exercised influence on individuals' life and on the history of nations. Martius Galeotti described him as "king and astrologer", and Antonio Bonfini said Matthias "never did anything without consulting the stars". Upon his request, the famous astronomers of the age, Johannes Regiomontanus and Marcin Bylica, set up an observatory in Buda and installed it with astrolabes and celestial globes. Regiomontanus dedicated his book on navigation that was used by Christopher Columbus to Matthias. The King appointed Bylica as his advisor in 1468. According to Scott E. Hendrix, "establishing a prominent astrologer as his political advisor provided an anxiety-reduction mechanism that boosted morale for the political elites within his realm while strengthening his sense of control in the face of the multiple adversities the Hungarians faced" in his reign.

== Family ==
Ancestors of Matthias Corvinus

16. Costea (?)
8. Serbe
4. Voyk Hunyadi
2. John Hunyadi
1. Matthias Corvinus
24. Roland Szilágyi
12. Nicholas Szilágyi
6. Ladislaus Szilágyi
3. Elizabeth Szilágyi
28. Michael Bellyéni
14. Stephen Bellyéni
7. Catherina Bellyéni

When Matthias was 12, his family arranged for him to marry Elizabeth of Celje who was also a child when their marriage took place in 1455. She died in September before the marriage was consummated. His second wife Catherine of Poděbrady was born in 1449. She died in childbirth in January or February 1464. The child did not survive.

Matthias approached Emperor Frederick to suggest a new bride for him among Frederick's relatives. Frederick II, Elector of Brandenburg proposed one of his daughters to Matthias but the Hungarian Estates opposed this plan. In an attempt to enter into an alliance with King Casimir IV of Poland, Matthias proposed to the King's daughter Hedvig but he was refused. During the 1470 meeting of Emperor Frederick and Matthias, a marriage between Matthias and the Emperor's five-year-old daughter Kunigunde of Austria was also discussed, but the Emperor was not willing to commit himself to the marriage.

Matthias's third wife Beatrice of Naples was born in 1457. Their engagement was announced in Breslau on 30 October 1474, during the siege of the town by Casimir IV and Vladislaus Jagiellon. Her dowry amounted to 200,000 gold pieces. Beatrice survived her husband and returned to Naples where she died in 1508.

Matthias's only known child John Corvinus was born out of wedlock in 1473. His mother Barbara Edelpöck, the daughter of a citizen of Stein in Lower Austria, met the King in early 1470. John Corvinus died on 12 October 1504.

== Legacy ==
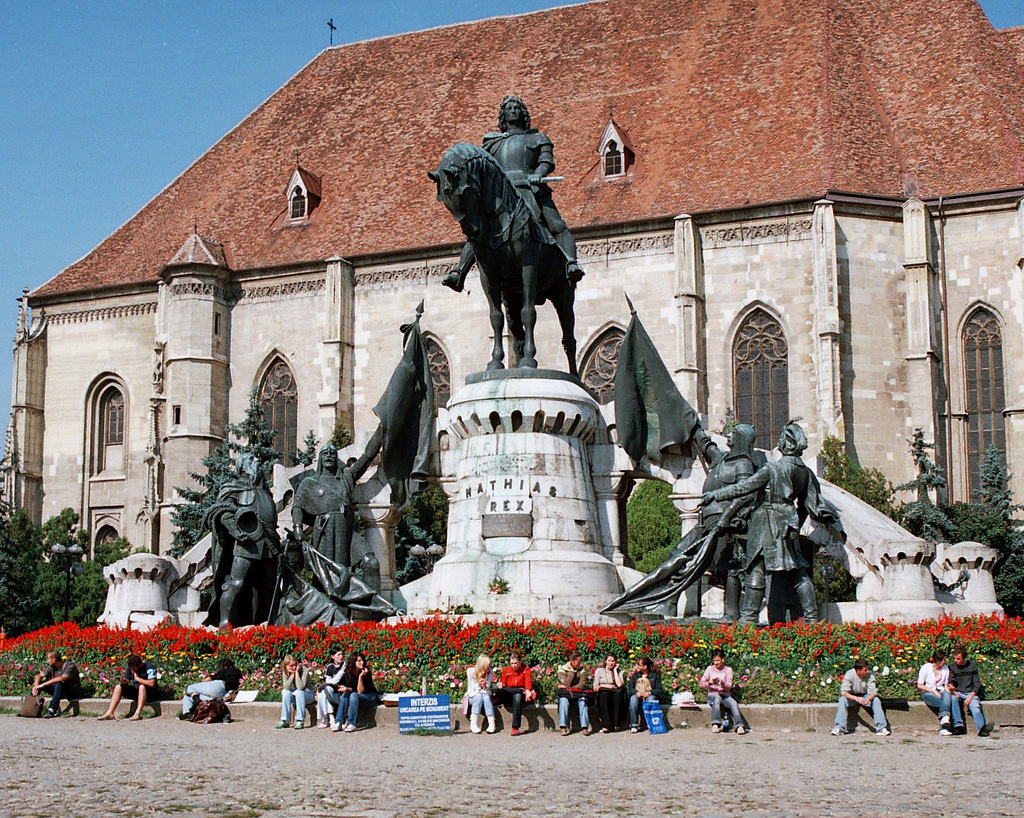
Matthias Corvinus Monument in front of St. Michael's Church (Cluj-Napoca)

According to Marcus Tanner, Matthias ruled "a European superpower" at the end of his reign. His conquests, however, were lost within months of his death. The burghers of Breslau soon murdered his captain, Heinz Dompnig. The Emperor's rule in Vienna and Wiener Neustadt was restored without resistance.

Stephen Zápolya said the King's death relieved "Hungary of the trouble and oppression from which it had suffered so far". Royal authority quickly diminished because various claimants (John Corvinus; Maximilian of the Romans; Vladislaus Jagiellon; and Vladislaus's younger brother, John Albert), who were fighting for the crown. Vladislaus Jagiellon triumphed because the barons regarded him as a weak ruler and he gained the support of Matthias's wealthy widow by promising to marry her. Vladislaus was elected king after he promised he would abolish all "harmful innovations" introduced by Matthias, especially the extraordinary tax. Vladislaus could not finance the maintenance of the Black Army and the unpaid mercenaries began plundering the countryside. A royal force led by Paul Kinizsi eliminated them on the river Száva in 1492.

The burden of Matthias's wars and splendid royal court mainly fell on the peasants, who paid at least 85% of the taxes. The Chronicle of Dubnic, written in eastern Hungary in 1479, says "widows and orphans" cursed the King for the high taxes. However, stories about "Matthias the Just", who wandered in disguise throughout his realm to deliver justice to his subjects, seem to have spread during Matthias's reign. The saying "Dead is Matthias, lost is justice" became popular soon after his death, reflecting that commoners were more likely to have received a fair trial in Matthias's reign than under his successors. Matthias is also the subject of popular folk tales in Croatia, Hungary, Serbia, and Slovenia. For instance, King Matjaž is one of the sleeping kings of Slovenian folklore.

== Origin of the nickname Corvinus ==
As a king, Matthias had the nickname Corvinus, which comes from Corvus, Latin for raven. The image of the raven appeared on his coat of arms. The name Corvinus, as adopted by Matthias and used only by himself and his descendants, was likely based on his family's coat of arms. Through this name, chronicler Antonio Bonfini created a connection between the Hunyadi family and the Roman patrician family of Corvinus (gens Valeria, the Corvinus name originating from Marcus Valerius Corvus), thus Matthias could claim his descent from the legendary Roman noble Valerius Volusus. Using Bonfini's story, the king could turn to this ancient Roman descent whenever other noblemen mentioned his modest "Wallachian" origins.

== In popular culture ==
- Matthias Corvinus leads the Hungarian civilization in the Gathering Storm expansion of the 4X video game Civilization VI.
- In the Turkish historical fiction TV series Mehmed: Fetihler Sultanı, King Matthias is portrayed by Turkish actor Recep Usta.

== Gallery ==
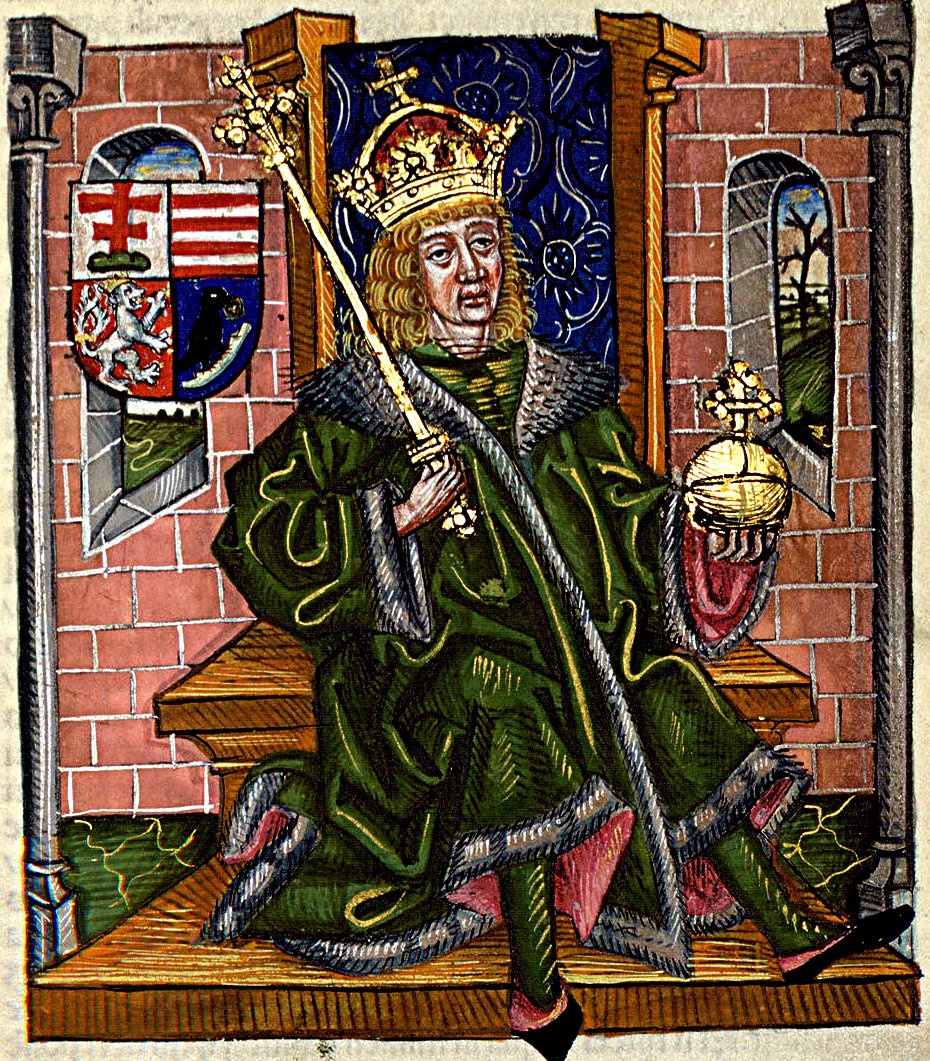
Matthias I (Chronica Hungarorum, 1488)

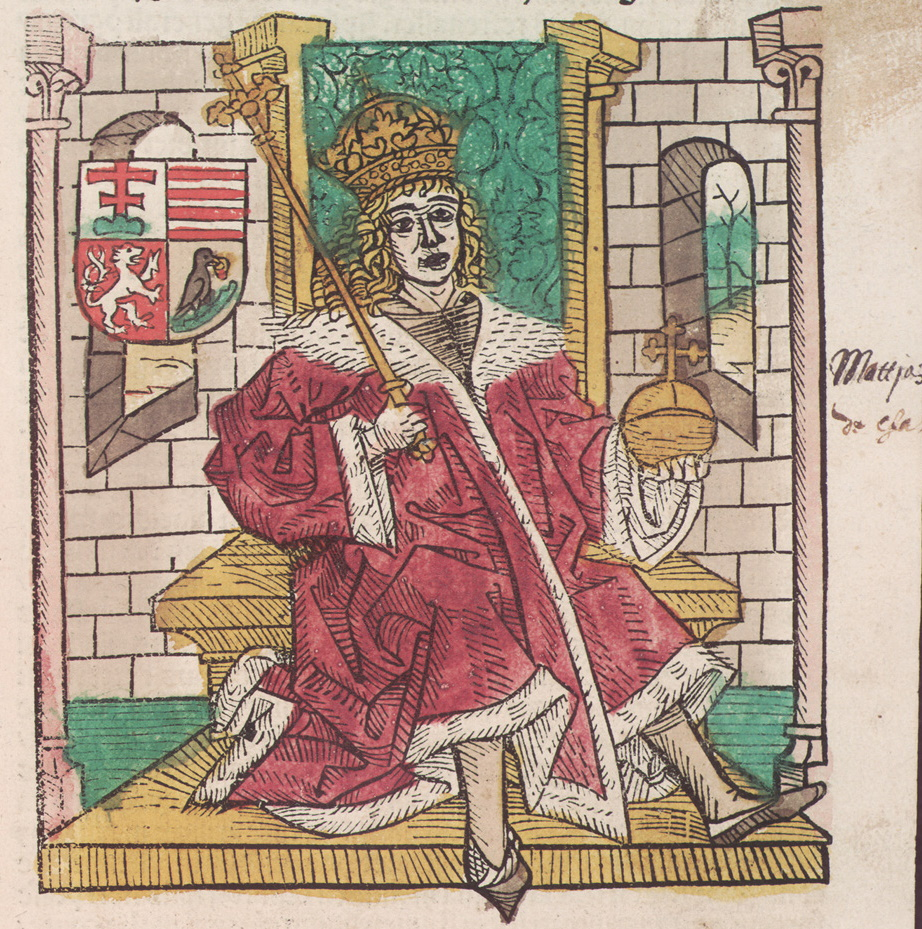
Matthias Corvinus depicted in Johannes de Thurocz's Chronica Hungarorum

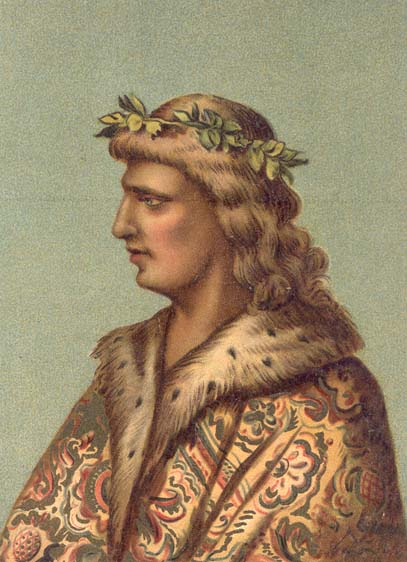
Matthias as young monarch (after a contemporary miniature from the Corviniana collection of the British Museum)

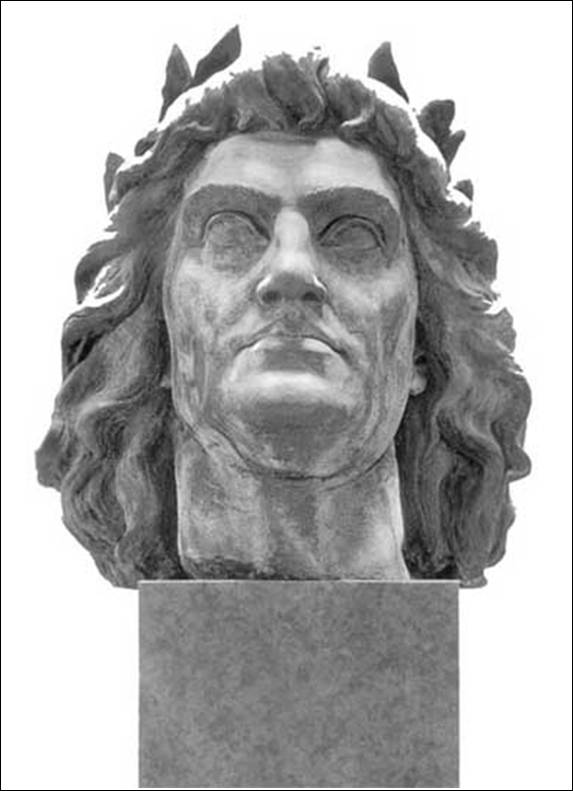
The roughly 50-year-old Matthias in the style of Constantine the Great (contemporary sculpture from Buda Castle)

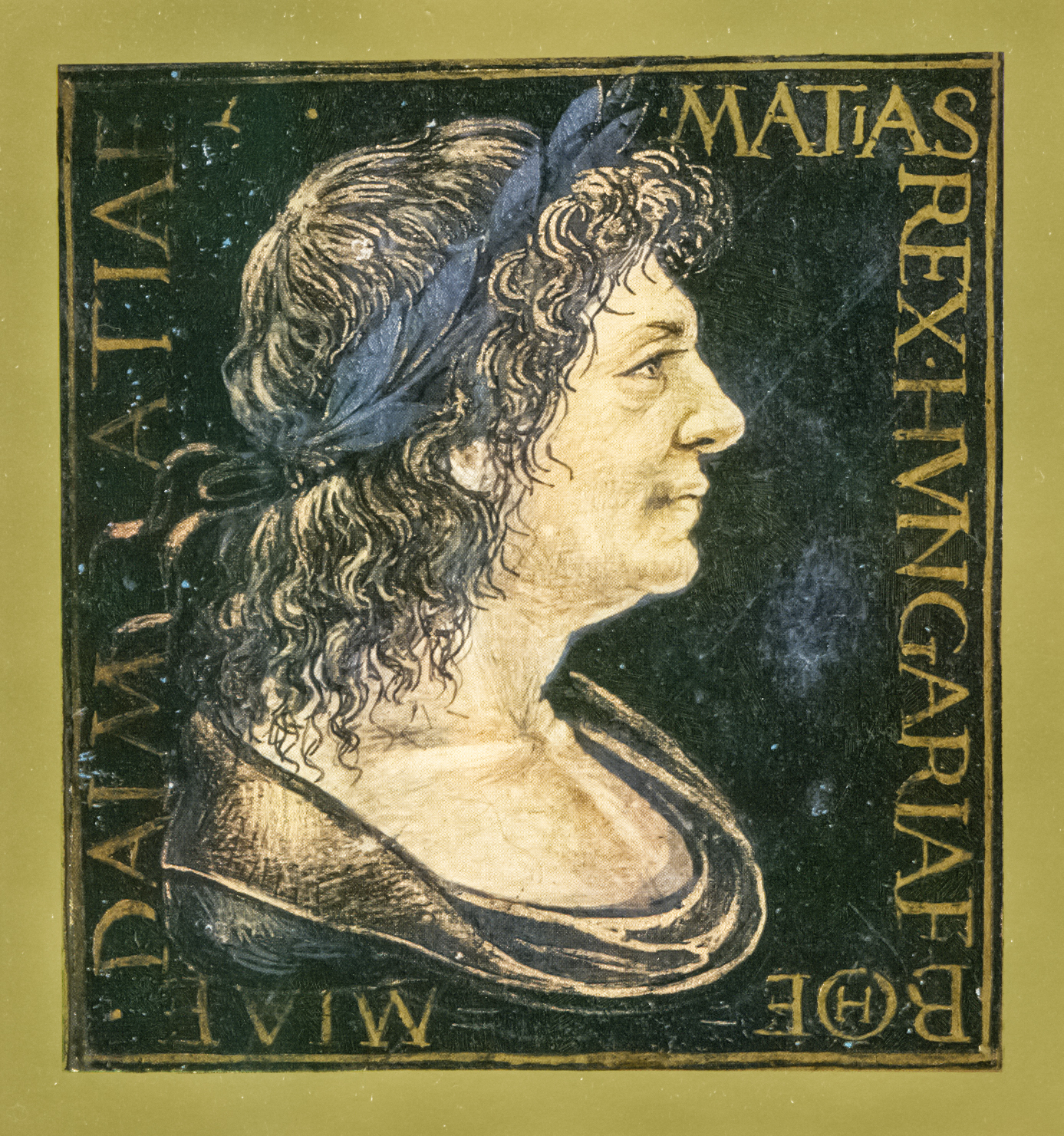
Matthias Corvinus from a Corvina Codex

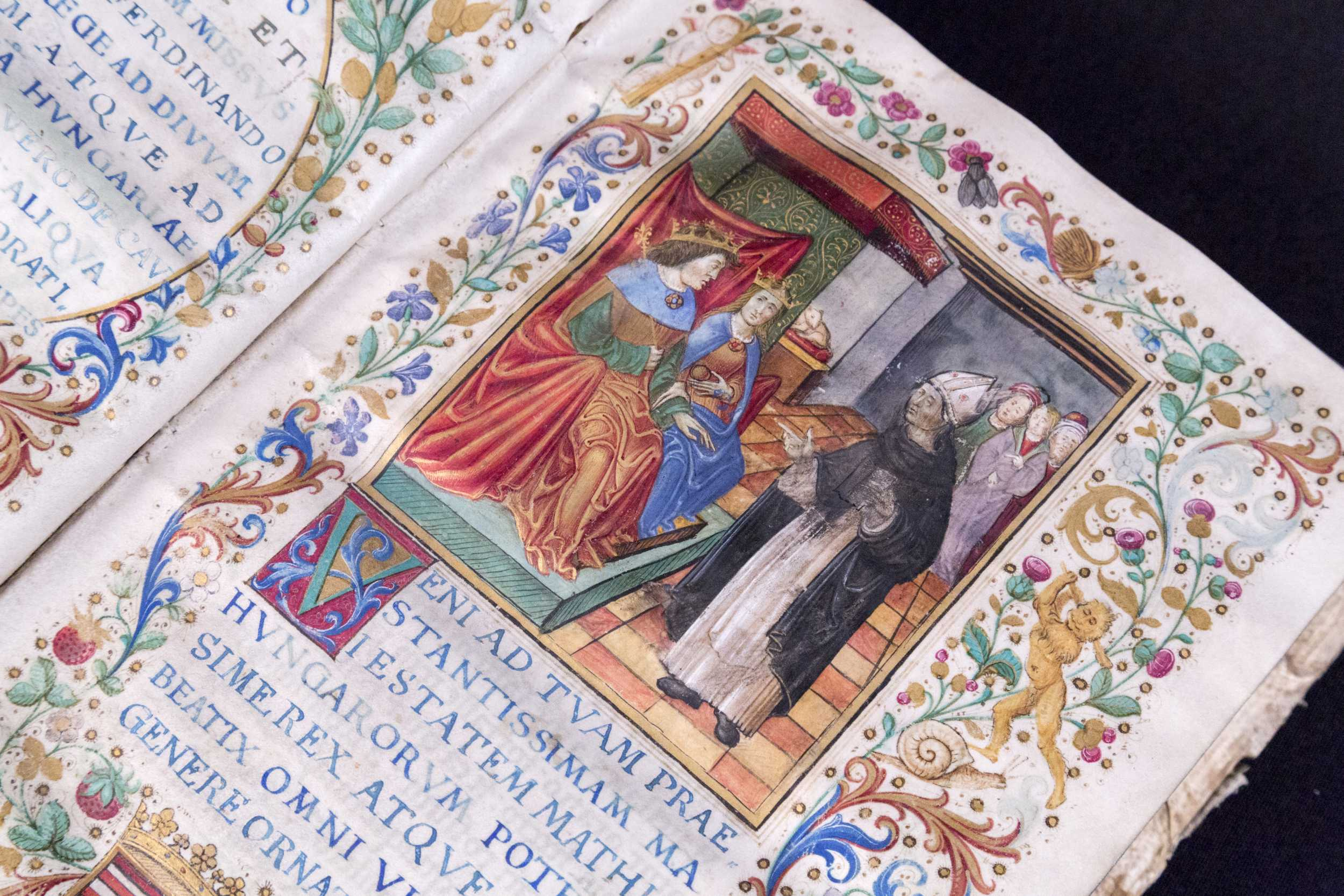
Italian humanist, Pietro Ranzano before King Matthias Corvinus and Queen Beatrice (Epitome rerum Hungarorum, 1490)

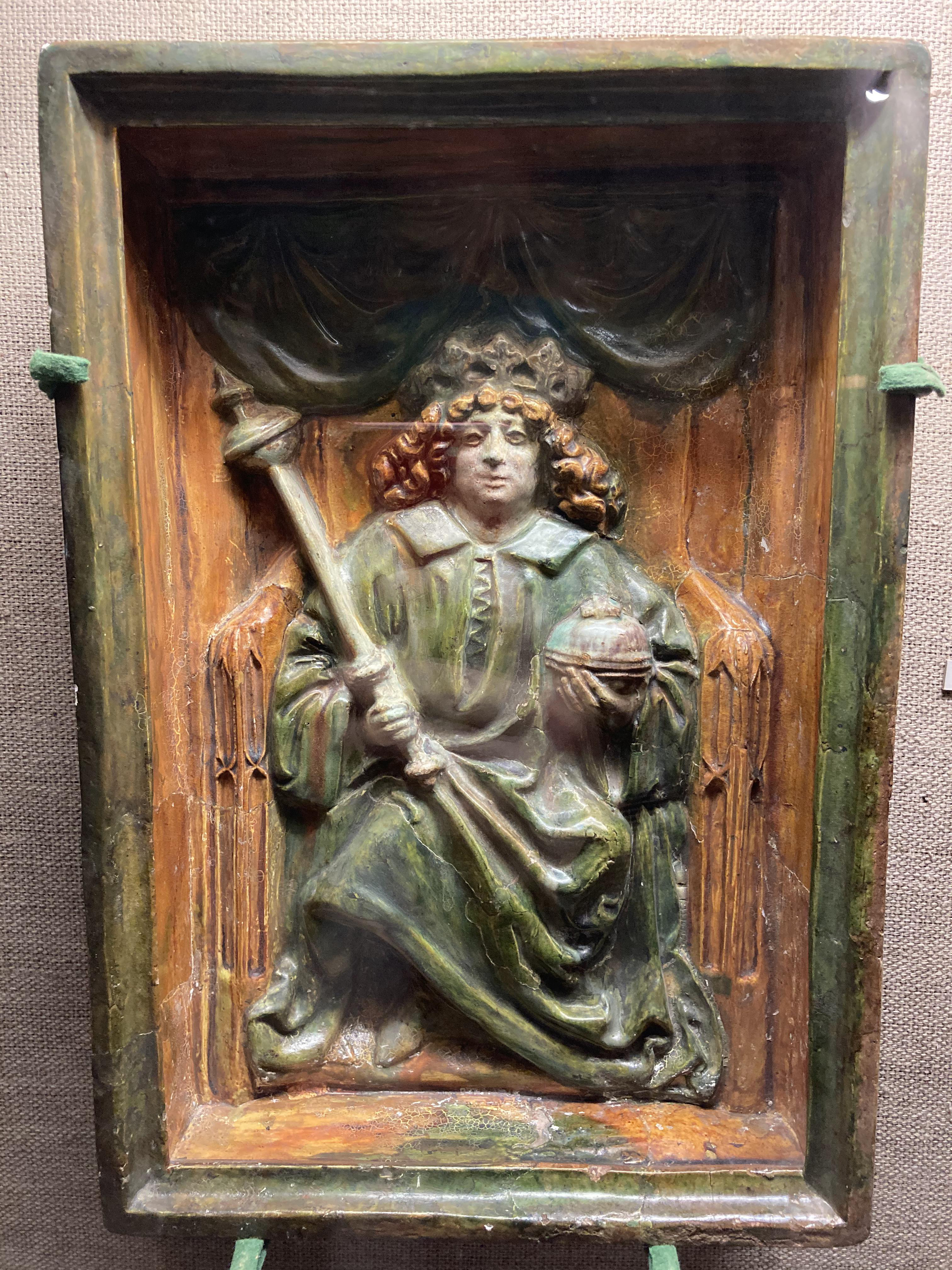
This stove tile depicts King Matthias (from Buda Castle, 1480)

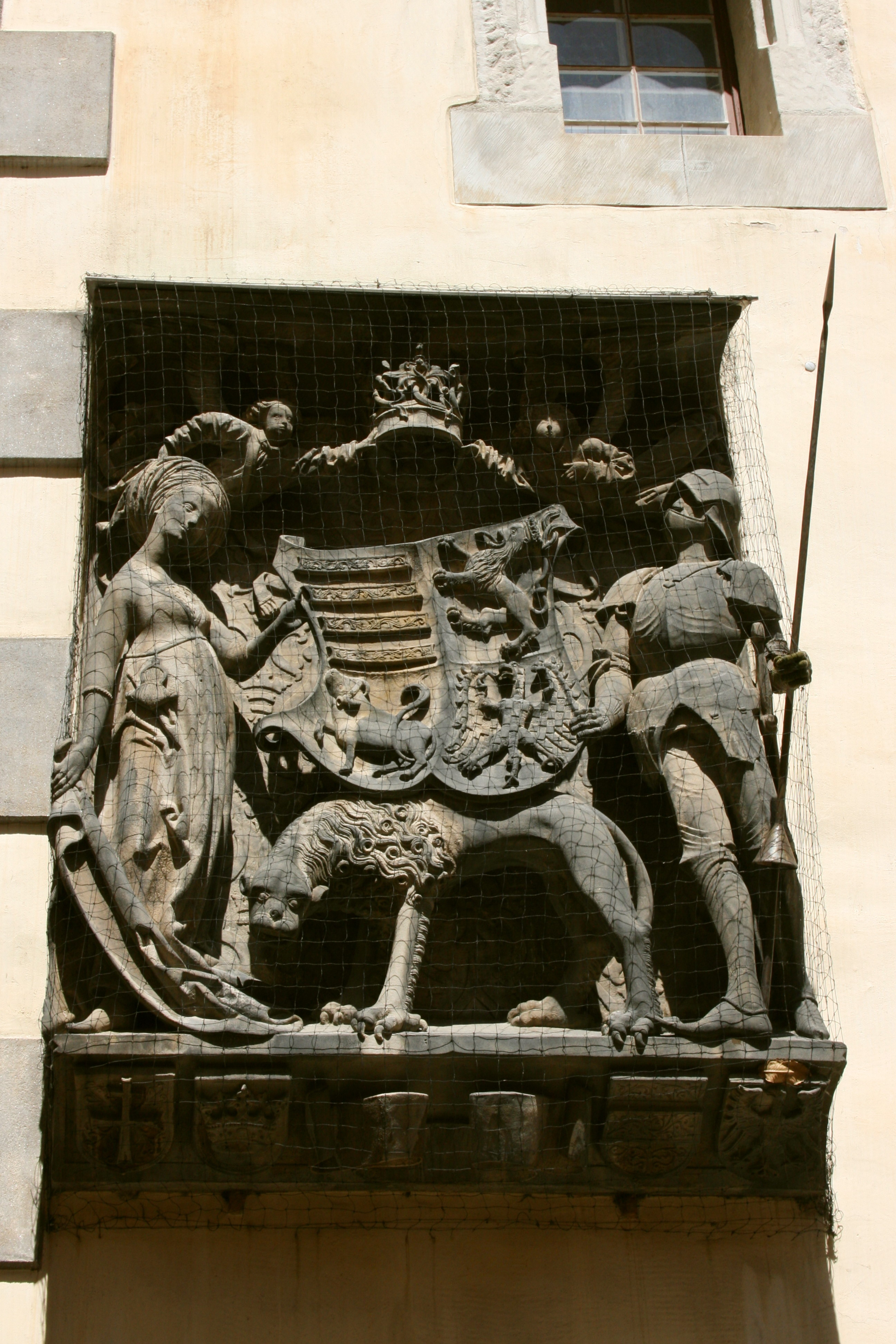
Coat of arms of Corvinus on the old Townhall of Görlitz as a sign that Görlitz belonged to the Hungarian crown under King Matthias (1488)

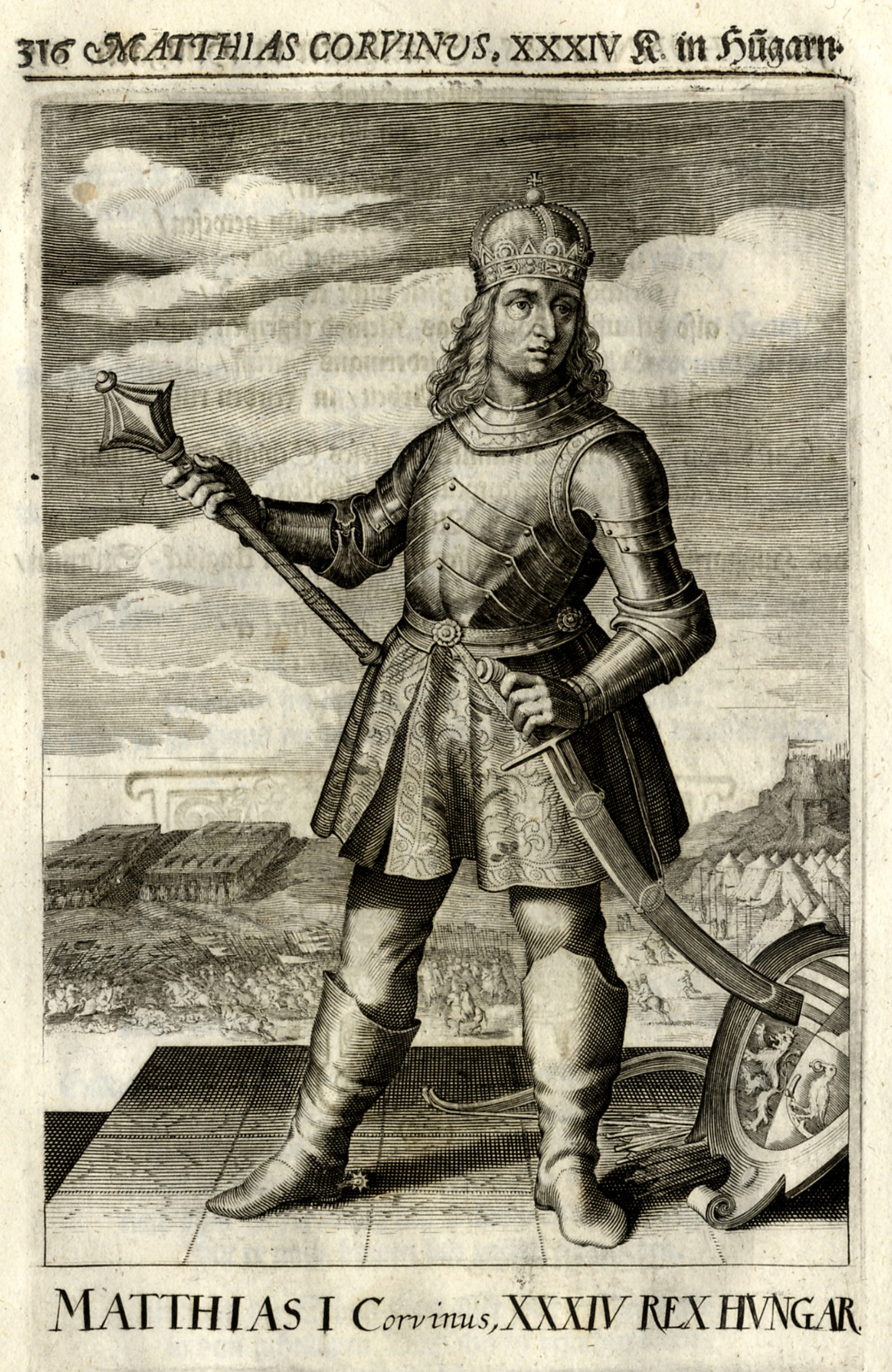
King Matthias Corvinus (Nádasdy Mausoleum, 1664)

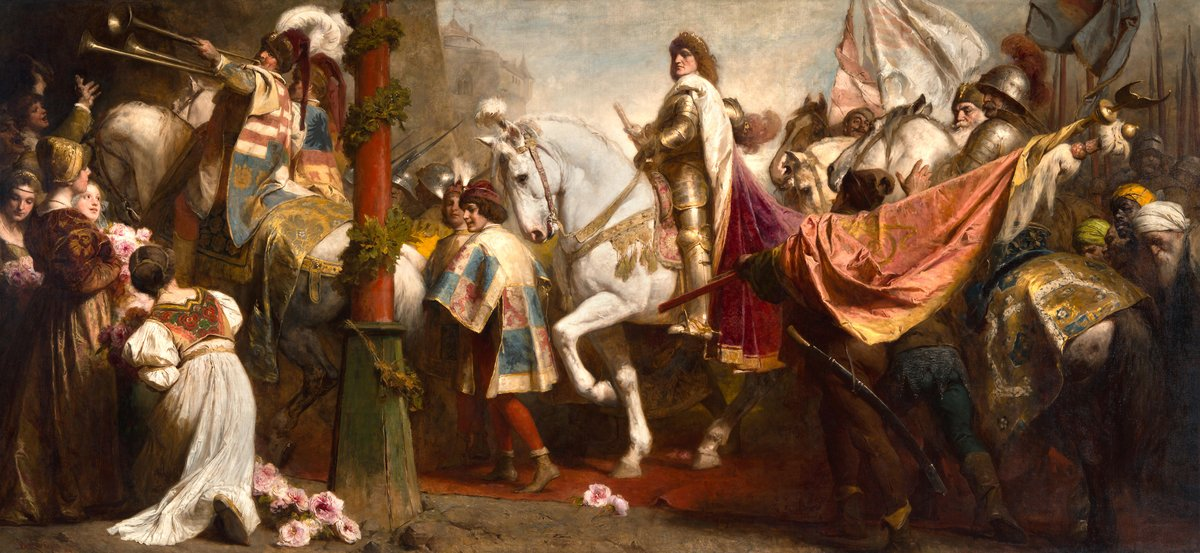
The triumphant Matthias (painting by Gyula Benczúr in 1919, Hungarian National Gallery, Budapest)

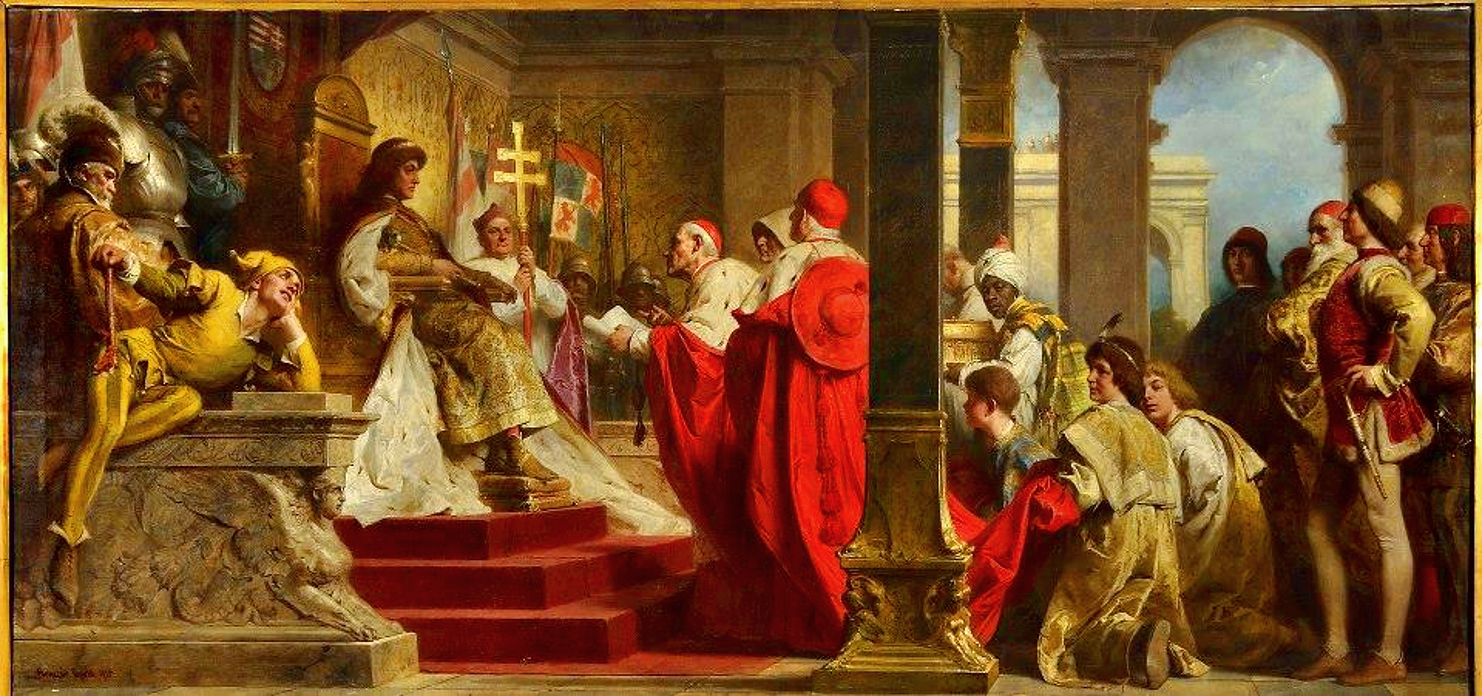
King Matthias receives the Papal Legates (painting by Gyula Benczúr in 1915)

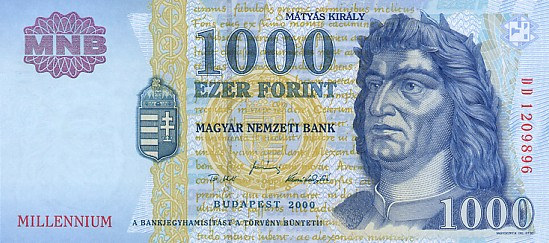
King Matthias on the 1000 forint Hungarian banknote (1998–)

== Sources ==
- Babinger, Franz (1978). Mehmed the Conqueror and His Time. Princeton University Press. ISBN 0-691-09900-6.
- Bak, János (1994). "The Late Medieval period (1382–1526)". In Sugar, Peter F.; Hanák, Péter; Frank, Tibor (eds.). A History of Hungary. Indiana University Press. pp. 54–82. ISBN 0-253-20867-X.
- Bak, János M.; Domonkos, Leslie S.; Harvey, Paul B.; Garay, Kathleen (1996). The Laws of the Medieval Kingdom of Hungary, 1458–1490 (The Laws of Hungary, Series I: Volume3). Charles Schlacks, Jr. ISBN 1-884445-26-8.
- Bartl, Július; Čičaj, Viliam; Kohútova, Mária; Letz, Róbert; Segeš, Vladimír; Škvarna, Dušan (2002). Slovak History: Chronology & Lexicon. Bolchazy-Carducci Publishers, Slovenské Pedegogické Nakladatel'stvo. ISBN 0-86516-444-4.
- Bónis, György (1971). A jogtudó értelmiség a Mohács előtti Magyarországon [Hungarian intelligentsia having legal expertise in the period before the battle of Mohács] (in Hungarian). Akadémiai Kiadó.
- Boubín, Jaroslav (2011). "The Bohemian Crownlands under the Jagiellons (1471–1526)". In Pánek, Jaroslav; Tůma, Oldřich (eds.). A History of the Czech Lands. Charles University in Prague. pp. 173–187. ISBN 978-80-246-1645-2.
- Cacioppe, Ron (2007). "Marsilio Ficino: Magnus of the Renaissance, Shaper of Leaders". Integral Leadership Review. 7 (2). Integral Publishers. ISSN 1554-0790.
- Cartledge, Bryan (2011). The Will to Survive: A History of Hungary. C. Hurst & Co. ISBN 978-1-84904-112-6.
- de Cevins, Marie-Madeleine (2016). Mathias Corvin, un roi pour l'Europe centrale (1458–1490) (in French). Les Indes Savantes. ISBN 978-2-84654-436-8.
- Dörner, Anton E. (2005). "Transylvania between stability and crisis (1457–1541)". In Pop, Ioan-Aurel; Nägler, Thomas (eds.). The History of Transylvania, Vol. I. (until 1541). Romanian Cultural Institute. pp. 299–348. ISBN 973-7784-04-9.
- Dvořáková, Daniela (2019). Barbara Celjska. Črna kraljica (1392–1451) (in Slovenian). Celjska Mohorjeva. ISBN 978-961-278-428-7.
- E. Kovács, Péter (1990). Matthias Corvinus (in Hungarian). Officina Nova. ISBN 963-7835-49-0.
- Engel, Pál (2001). The Realm of St Stephen: A History of Medieval Hungary, 895–1526. I.B. Tauris Publishers. ISBN 1-86064-061-3.
- Fallows, David (2020) [2009]. Josquin (2nd ed.). Turnhout: Brepols Publishers. ISBN 978-2-503-56674-0.
- Fine, John V. A (1994). The Late Medieval Balkans: A Critical Survey from the Late Twelfth Century to the Ottoman Conquest. The University of Michigan Press. ISBN 0-472-08260-4.
- Florescu, Radu R.; McNally, Raymond T. (1989). Dracula Prince of Many Faces: His Life and His Ties. Back Bay Books. ISBN 978-0-316-28656-5.
- Grgin, Borislav (2003). "The Ottoman influences on Croatia in the second half of the fifteenth century". Historical Contributions. 21 (23). Croatian Institute of History: 87–102.
- Gella, Aleksander (1989). Development of Class Structure in Eastern Europe: Poland and Her Southern Neighbors. SUNY Press. ISBN 978-1-4384-0392-2.
- Hendrix, Scott E. (2013). "Astrological forecasting and the Turkish menace in the Renaissance Balkans" (PDF). Anthropology. 13 (2). Universitatis Miskolciensis: 57–72. ISSN 1452-7243. Archived from the original (PDF) on 4 July 2022.
- Johnson, Paul (2007). The Renaissance: A Short History. Random House. p. 175. ISBN 978-0-307-43255-1.
- Kaufmann, Thomas DeCosta (1995). Court, Cloister, and City: The Art and Culture of Central Europe, 1450–1800. University of Chicago Press. p. 30. ISBN 0-226-42729-3.
- Kisfaludy, Katalin: Matthias rex. Budapest 1983. Gondolat.
- Klaniczay, Tibor (1992). "The age of Matthias Corvinus". In Porter, Roy; Teich, Mikuláš (eds.). The Renaissance in National Context. Cambridge University Press. pp. 164–179. ISBN 0-521-36970-3.
- Kubinyi, András (2004). "Adatok a Mátyás-kori királyi kancellária és az 1464. évi kancelláriai reform történetéhez [On the history of the Royal Chancellery in the reign of Matthias Corvinus and of the 1464 reform of the chancellery]" (PDF). Publicationes Universitatis Miskolciensis. Sectio Philosophica (in Hungarian). IX (1). Universitatis Miskolciensis: 25–58. ISSN 1219-543X.
- Kubinyi, András (2008). Matthias Rex. Balassi Kiadó. ISBN 978-963-506-767-1.
- Lukács, István (2010). "King Matthias Corvinus in the Collective Memory of the Slovenian Nation". Studia Slavica 55 (2). Akadémiai Kiadó. pp. 371–379.
- Macey, Patrick; Noble, Jeremy; Dean, Jeffrey; Reese, Gustave (2011) [2001]. "Josquin (Lebloitte dit) des Prez". Grove Music Online. Oxford: Oxford University Press. doi:10.1093/gmo/9781561592630.article.14497. ISBN 978-1-56159-263-0. (subscription, Wikilibrary access, or UK public library membership required)
- Magaš, Branka (2007). Croatia Through History. SAQI. ISBN 978-0-86356-775-9.
- Markó, László (2006). A magyar állam főméltóságai Szent Istvántól napjainkig: Életrajzi Lexikon [Great Officers of State in Hungary from King Saint Stephen to Our Days: A Biographical Encyclopedia] (in Hungarian). Helikon Kiadó. ISBN 963-547-085-1.
- Mureşanu, Camil (2001). John Hunyadi: Defender of Christendom. The Center for Romanian Studies. ISBN 973-9432-18-2.
- Pop, Ioan-Aurel (2005). "The Romanians in the 14th–16th centuries from the "Christian Republic" to the "Restoration of Dacia"". In Pop, Ioan-Aurel; Bolovan, Ioan (eds.). History of Romania: Compendium. Romanian Cultural Institute (Center for Transylvanian Studies). pp. 209–314. ISBN 978-973-7784-12-4.
- Pop, Ioan-Aurel (2012). "The Names in the Family of King Matthias Corvinus: From Old Sources to Contemporary Historiography" (PDF). Ethnographica et Folkloristica Carpathica. 17 (35). Debreceni Egyetem Néprajzi Tanszék: 11–40. ISSN 0139-0600. Archived from the original (PDF) on 3 August 2020.
- Rubinstein, Nicolai (1991). "Italian political thought, 1450–1530". In Burns, J. H.; Goldie, Mark (eds.). The Cambridge History of Political Thought, 1450–1700. Cambridge University Press. pp. 30–65. ISBN 0-521-24716-0.
- Šmahel, František (2011). "The Hussite Revolution (1419–1471)". In Pánek, Jaroslav; Tůma, Oldřich (eds.). A History of the Czech Lands. Charles University in Prague. pp. 149–169. ISBN 978-80-246-1645-2.
- Tanner, Marcus (2009). The Raven King: Matthias Corvinus and the Fate of his Lost Library. Yale University Press. ISBN 978-0-300-15828-1.
- Teke, Zsuzsa (1981). "A középkori magyar állam virágzása és bukása, 1301–1526: 1458–1490 [Flourishing and Fall of Medieval Hungary, 1301–1526: 1458–1490]". In Solymosi, László (ed.). Magyarország történeti kronológiája, I: a kezdetektől 1526-ig [Historical Chronology of Hungary, Volume I: From the Beginning to 1526] (in Hungarian). Akadémiai Kiadó. pp. 79–187. ISBN 963-05-2661-1.
- Verspohl, Franz-Joachim (2007). Michelangelo Buonarroti und Leonardo Da Vinci: Republikanischer Alltag und Künstlerkonkurrenz in Florenz zwischen 1501 und 1505 (in German). Wallstein Verlag. ISBN 978-3-8353-0216-7.
- Waldman, Louis Alexander; Farbaky, Péter (2011). Italy & Hungary: Humanism and Art in the Early Renaissance. Harvard University Graduate School of Design. ISBN 978-0-674-06346-4.

Matthias Corvinus House of Hunyadi Born: 23 February 1443 Died: 6 April 1490
Regnal titles
Vacant Title last held by Ladislaus V	King of Hungary and Croatia; 1458–1490	Succeeded by Vladislaus II
Preceded by George	— DISPUTED — King of Bohemia; 1469–1490; Disputed by George and Vladislaus II	Succeeded by Vladislaus II
Preceded by Frederick V	— DISPUTED — Duke of Austria; 1487–1490; Disputed by Frederick V	Succeeded by Frederick V
