= Böcek =

Böcek may refer to:

- Böcek, Aydın, a neighbourhood in Turkey
- Böcek (novel), a 1980 novel by Erhan Bener
- Muhittin Böcek (born 1962), Turkish politician
