= Zdeněk Lev of Rožmitál =

Czech hofmeister and politician (1470–1535)

- Born: c. 1470
- Died: 14 July 1535
- Noble family: Lev of Rožmitál
- Spouse: Kateřina Švihovská of Rýzmberk
- Father: Jaroslav Lev of Rožmitál

Zdeněk Lev of Rožmitál (Czech: Zdeněk Lev z Rožmitálu, German: Zdeniek Lev von Rosental; c. 1470 – 14 July 1535) was a Bohemian nobleman. He belonged to the estate of the Lords (páni), the highest rank of the Bohemian titled nobility, and held the offices of High Judge and High Burgrave of Prague. He was a member of the aristocratic Lev of Rožmitál family and was one of the most influential noblemen in the country during the reign of Kings Vladislaus II and Louis II.

== Life ==
His father, Jaroslav Lev of Rožmitál, was a brother-in-law of King George of Poděbrady.

Zdeněk belonged to the Catholic party in the Czech peerage. When he was 26 years old, he took part in public negotiations with the Hungarian king. From 1498 to 1504 he was a viscount of Karlštejn. In 1504, he was appointed the High Court Judge of the Kingdom of Bohemia and 1507 he was finally appointed as High Burgrave of Prague.

In this position, Zdeněk administered Bohemia, as King Vladislaus II spent most of his time in Hungary. He primarily represented the interests of the Catholic peers. His aim was to expend their rights and privileges, at the expense of the rest of the nobility. His opponents accused him of deceit, injustice and cruelty. As administrator of the royal domain, he was also accused of avarice. However, historians have described him as a righteous man, who primarily demanded that his officers do their duty.

In 1519, he was accused of embezzling state funds, and criminal proceedings were started. In 1523, he was forced to resign from his post as Supreme Burgrave of Bohemia. However, his successor lasted for only two years, and in 1525 he was re-appointed and some of his friends were also elevated to high office. In the meantime, the number of his Catholic enemies grew; in particular the House of Rosenberg turned against him, due to a dispute over the inheritance of Český Krumlov.

In 1526, Louis II fell in the Battle of Mohács, ending Jagiellon rule in Bohemia. Zdeněk was considered one of the candidates to succeed Louis II, although he was perhaps too old to be elected. Other possible candidates were Duke Charles I of Münsterberg-Oels and Duke Frederick II of Legnica. However, it soon turned out that the Estates preferred Ferdinand of Habsburg, who became Emperor as Ferdinand I. Zdeněk also supported Ferdinand's election. Unlike his predecessor, Ferdinand did not allow himself to be influenced by Zdeněk.

In 1528, Zdeněk again had to resign as High Burgrave. From then on, he concerned himself solely with the administration of his properties at Horní Blatná, Rožmitál, Velhartice, Klenová, Opálka, Lysá, Mšeno, Chbany, Zdechovice, Rýzmberk, Skály and Poděbrady. During this period, his large fortune melted away, as he lived beyond his means, maintaining a large court and organizing numerous feasts. After his death, his inheritance was annihilated by his outstanding debt.

== Marriage and Sale of Rožmitál ==
Zdeněk was married to Kateřina Švihovská of Rýzmberk (d. 1540). They had a daughter, Anna (d. 1563), who married Adam I of Hradec. Adam died of the plague in 1531. Her sons Adam and Zdeněk were Zdeněk's heirs. However, they were unable to pay off his accumulated debts. In 1550, their creditors sold Rožmitál to Florián Gryspek of Griespach, who became the next Lord of Rožmitál. Zdeněk's heirs then moved to Moravia.
