= Rožmitál pod Třemšínem Castle =

Castle in the Czech Republic

- Rožmitál pod Třemšínem in the Czech Republic
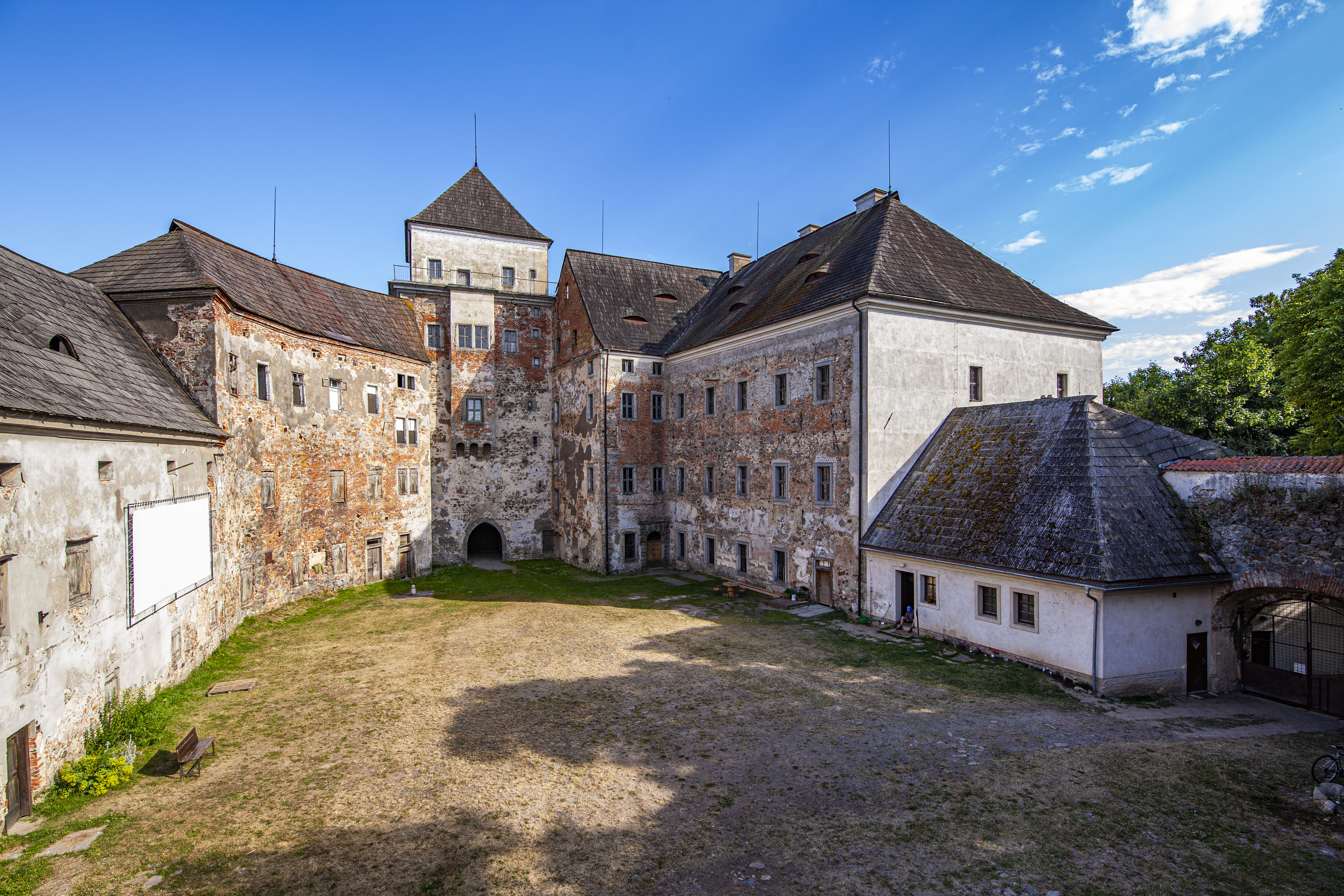
- Castle courtyard

Site information
- Type: Castle
- Owner: private
- Open to the public: occasionally
- Website: rozmitalskyzamek.cz

Location
- Location in the Czech Republic
- Coordinates: 49°36′8″N 13°51′44″E

Site history
- Built: 1230

Rožmitál pod Třemšínem Castle (Czech: zámek Rožmitál, German: Burg Rosental) is a castle in Rožmitál pod Třemšínem in the Central Bohemian Region of the Czech Republic. It was originally built in the Gothic style the 13th century and rebuilt in the Renaissance style in 16th-century on behalf of Florián Gryspek. Since 1958, it has been protected as a cultural monument. The castle is privately owned. Since 2018 it's been managed by a group of volunteers.

== History ==
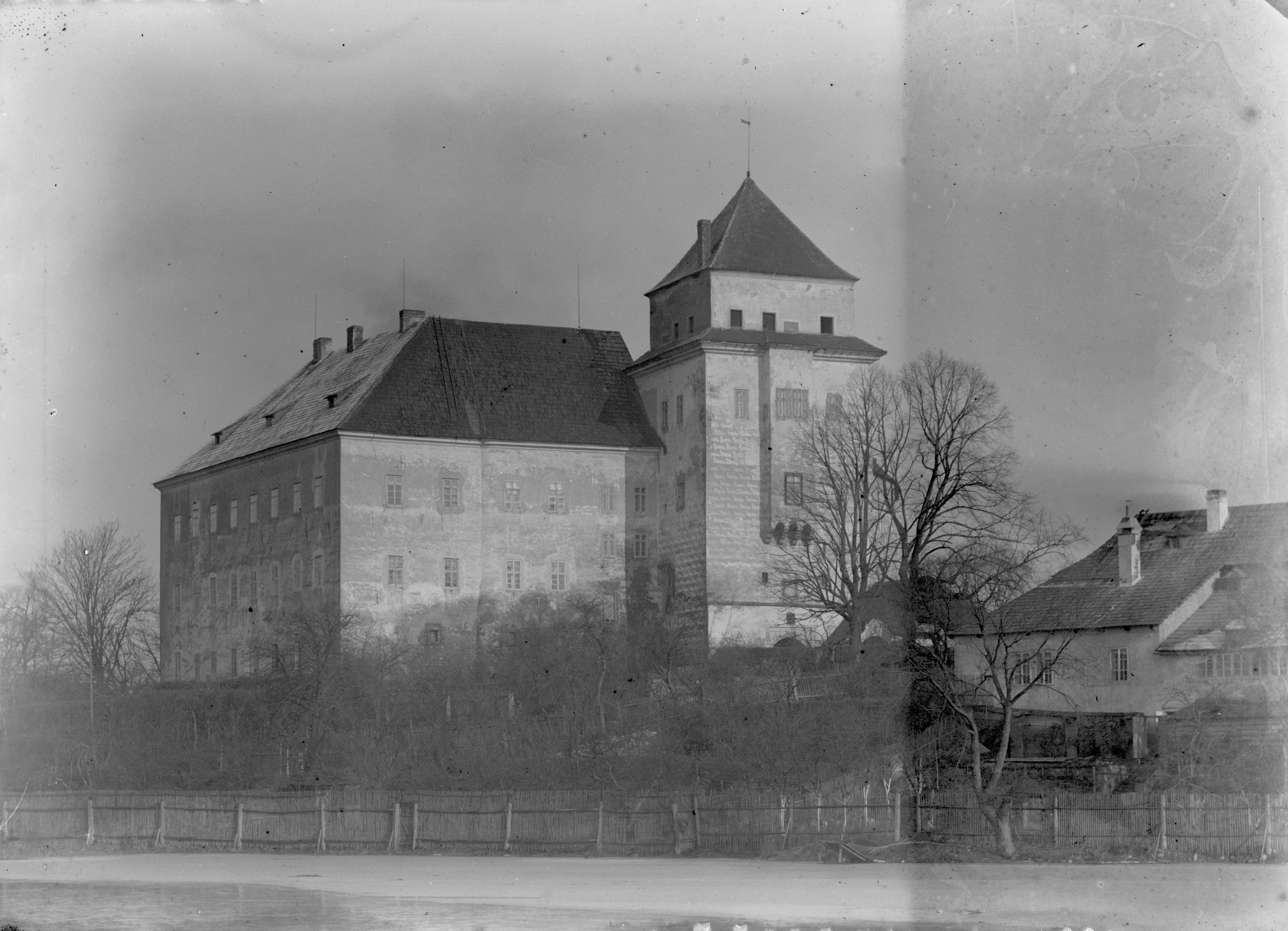
The castle in 1899

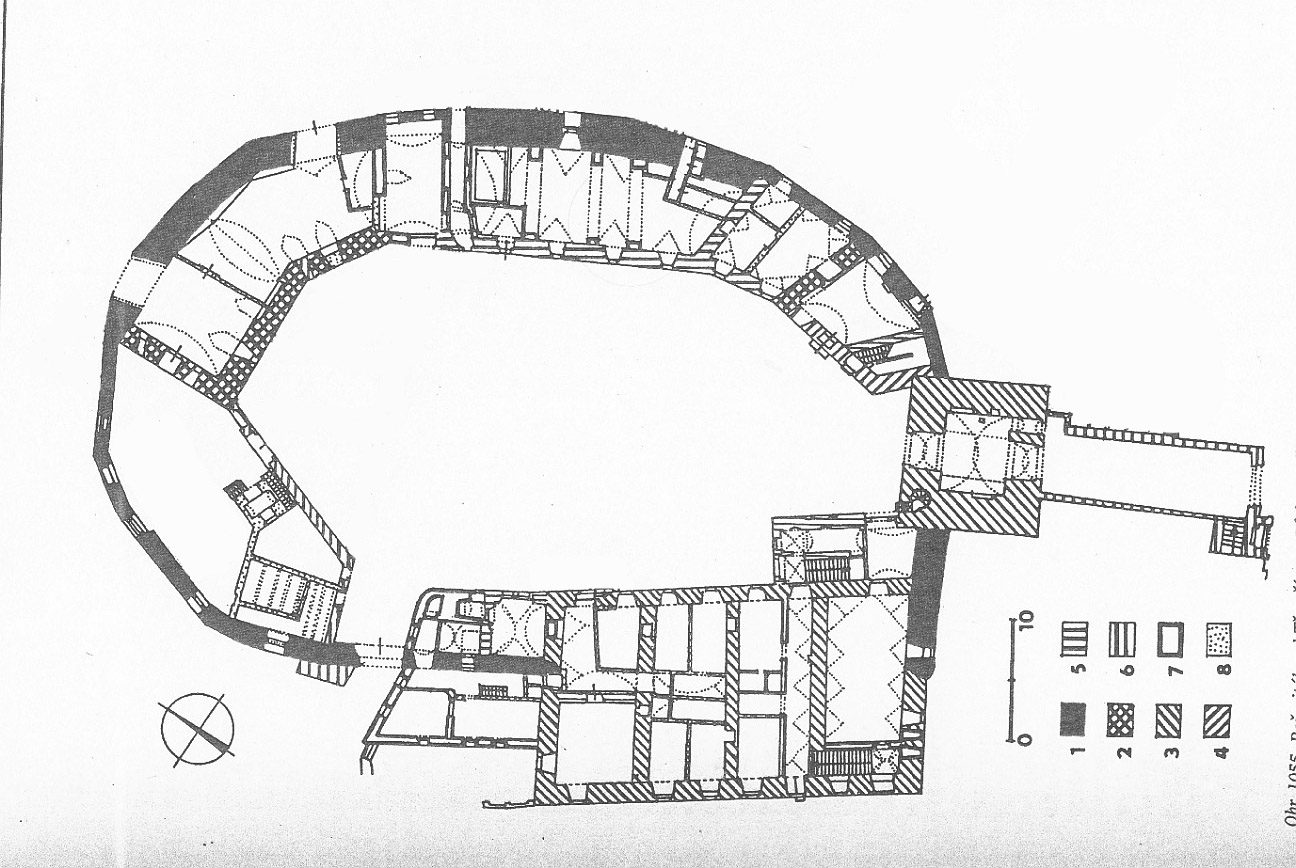
Ground plan

The Gothic castle, originally named Rosenthal, was founded in the first half of the 13th century by Oldřich of Buzic. He was also founder of a new family branch called the Lords of Rožmitál. His son Sezima gave half of the castle and the estate to the Archbishop of Prague in 1347. This division of ownership caused disputes between Sezima's brother Zdeněk and Archbishop Arnošt of Pardubice. The archbishops owned their half until the beginning of the Hussite Wars. In 1436, King Sigismund mortgaged the archbishop's half to the brothers Jan and Václav Zmrzlík of Svojšín. From them, unknown how, it was regained by the Lords of Rožmitál. They owned the reunited estate until 1545. Among the most important members of this family was Joanna of Rožmitál, the Czech queen and wife of King George of Poděbrady. Her brother Jaroslav Lev of Rožmitál led the diplomatic mission of George of Poděbrady, whose task was to unite the European monarchical courts against the Turks. The last prominent member of the family was Jaroslav's son Zdeněk of Rožmitál, the supreme hofmeister of the Bohemian Kingdom, supreme purgatory and judge and patron. During the time of Zdeněk Lev, the castle underwent significant structural modifications, which served as the basis for the later Renaissance reconstruction. Zdeněk Lev of Rožmitál led an expensive life and also lent considerable sums to nobles and the king. At the same time, he was indebted to his estates, making him the biggest creditor and debtor in his time. His sons had to cede their debts, including Rožmitál estate, to creditors. Then they left Bohemia and took refuge in Moravia.

In 1550–1555, the Rožmitál estate was gradually bought from its creditors by Florián Gryspek of Gryspach, a nobleman of Bavarian-Austrian origin. This high royal official had the original castle rebuilt into a Renaissance “chateau” in 1559-1564. The main result was the Great Palace, which rose from the original oval walls. Gryspek established a brewery, a bakery, granaries and had water brought in from a nearby hill through wooden pipes. He won new rights for the town, such as the right to hold markets, its own magistrate and the right to hold court. The Rožmitál estate remained in the possession of the Gryspek family until 1622, when all the property of the Grsypeks was confiscated by Emperor Ferdinand II because of their participation in the Estates Revolt. A year later, the castle and the estate were given to Archbishop Ernst Adalbert of Harrach by the King. The Archbishopric of Prague owned the castle and the estate until 1948. The castle served only as a summer residence. It burned down four times while in the possession of the archbishopric. These were in 1660, 1724, 1813 and 1940. Repairs were not sufficient and in 1893 the director of the archbishop's estate assessed the condition of the castle as very poor and neglected.

In 1948 the castle was nationalized. The furnishings of the castle were taken to other castles or stolen. After the nationalisation, the castle was used by the state enterprise Czechoslovak State Forests, which converted the premises into apartments and offices for its employees. The castle served in this way until the mid-1970s without any major maintenance. In 1974 the castle was transferred to the property of town of Rožmitál, which moved the inhabitants of the apartments to a newly built housing estate. The town began reconstruction of the castle, which was to serve as a museum of regional history when completed. The reconstruction was planned to be completed in 2000, but was interrupted by the events of the Velvet Revolution in 1989. After that, the reconstruction did not continue.

After the fall of the communist regime it was not clear how to use the castle. The town of Rožmitál did not have enough funds for the reconstruction. In February 1990, the town leadership offered the Archbishopric of Prague to transfer the castle back to its ownership, but the Archbishopric did not accept this offer. In the mid-1990s, the town of Rožmitál repaired parts of the castle with financial support from the Ministry of Culture, but the question of its use was still unclear. In 1998, the town of Rožmitál offered the castle to the Archbishopric of Prague again as part of the transfer of other immovable property in Rožmitál. This time the Archbishopric of Prague agreed to take over the castle as its property, as it had an investor, with whom the Archbishopric of Prague had previously collaborated on the renovation of houses in Prague. The castle was transferred to a private company, Trinity Coop. The new investor continued to renovate the castle, but soon the renovations ceased due to the loss of investment funds.

In 2014, part of the roof in the oldest part of the castle, the later brewery, collapsed. Due to the lack of regular maintenance, the castle became a target for vandals and the adjacent grounds were overgrown with trees.

In 2017, an open letter and petition was created from a civic initiative and sent to the owner. The letter was an expression of concern and sadness at the dismal state of the dilapidated castle, but also an offer to help save it. This initiative was also supported by the Czech National Trust, a charity for the preservation of monuments. With its patronage, the Rožmitálský zámek association was formed in 2019, with the aim of making the castle accessible to the public and engaging it in community life. With the help of volunteers and the town, seeding growth and rubbish dumps were removed. Some necessary repairs were also made and a new caretaker was appointed. The castle opened to the public for the first time in years on 22 December 2018. With the owners' approval, the castle was also opened for the first time during the traditional Queen Johana Festival in 2019.

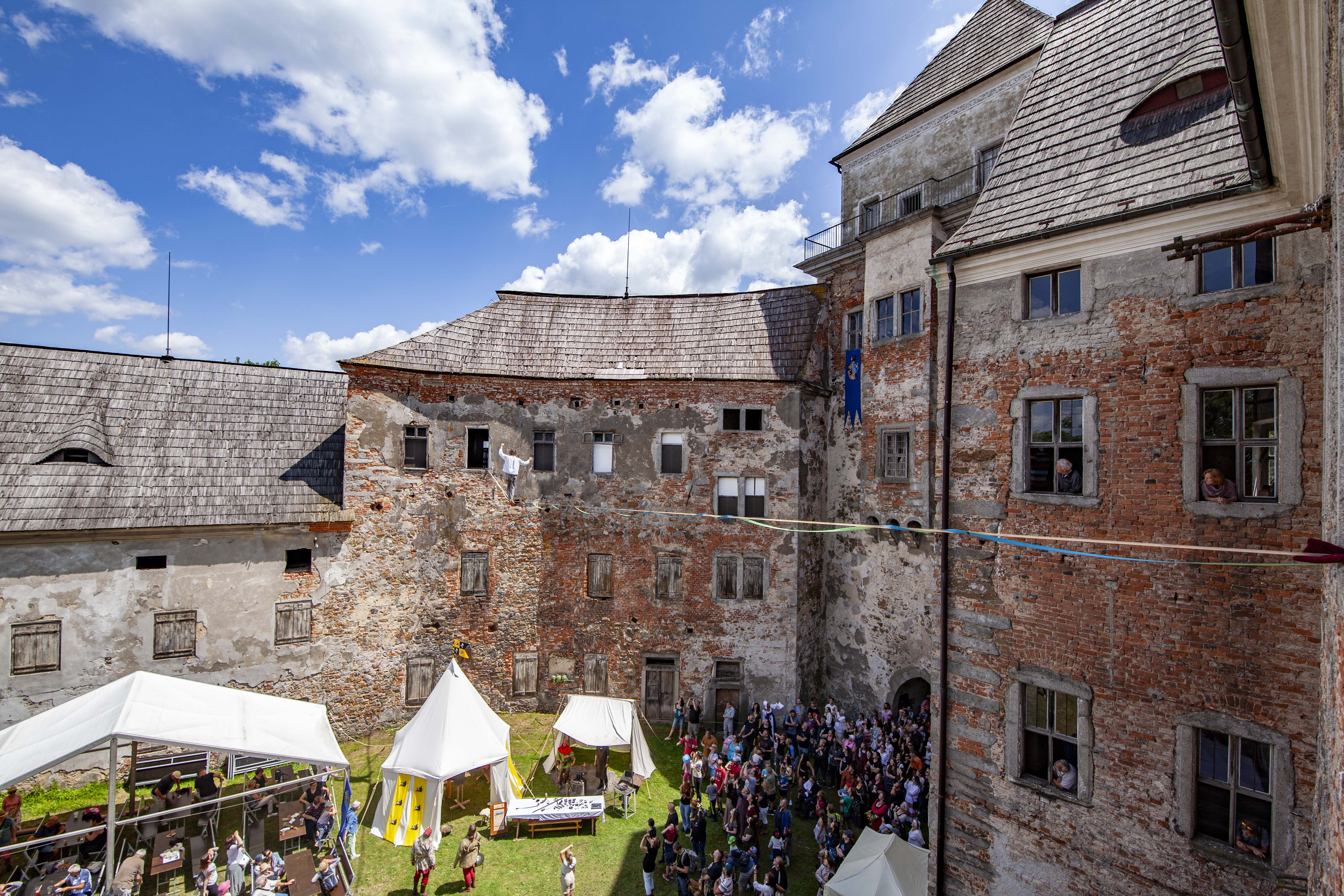
Queen Johana Festival 2023

Since 2019, the castle has been managed by the voluntary association Rožmitálský zámek, which opens the castle to the public during the summer season and organises various cultural events – concerts, theatrical shows, workshops, working holidays, art exhibitions or summer cinema in the courtyard. From 2021, the castle also hosts the multi-genre festival Repete Fest. Minor repairs were also carried out, including the installation of new gate and the replacement of two sections of shingle roofing.

== Description ==
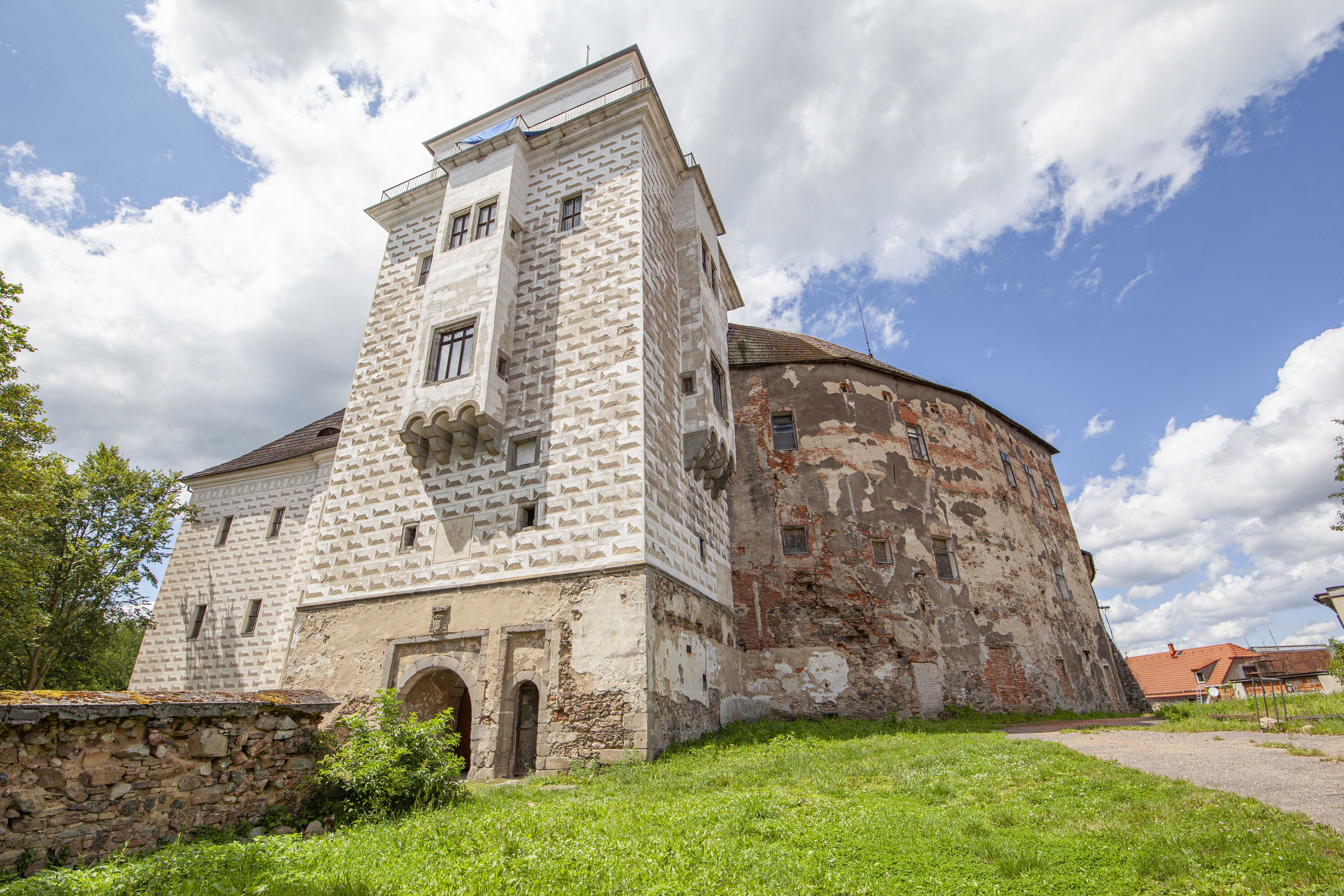
View from the south

The castle was founded in a muddy terrain and water played an important role in its defence. From the earliest construction phase, a perimeter wall has been preserved in the masonry of the castle, which defined an approximately oval area. The only corner in the wall was on the south-western side, where an unknown building may have stood. Some parts of the masonry in the eastern wing may date from the thirteenth century. During the Late Gothic reconstruction a large tower was built and probably under Zdeněk Lev of Rožmitál also a slightly younger large four-room palace, for which part of the outer wall was demolished. At the same time the tower was supplemented with bay windows. According to historical descriptions and depictions, the castle was fortified with ramparts and a wall with round bastions or towers during the late Gothic period. The preserved castle is a three-winged two-storey building built around an asymmetrical courtyard. On the facades there are traces of rustic plaster and on the tower there are sgraffiti and rosette window frames from the 1670s.

== In film ==
Castle Rožmitál was used as a filming location of Nosferatu (2024).

== See also ==
- List of castles in the Czech Republic
