= John II of Rosenberg =

Bohemian nobleman (1434–1472)

- Born: 1434
- Died: 8 November 1472; Ortenburg
- Buried: Vyšší Brod Monastery
- Noble family: House of Rosenberg
- Spouse: Anna of Glogau
- Father: Ulrich II of Rosenberg
- Mother: Catherine of Wartenberg

John II of Rosenberg (nicknamed: the peaceful; Czech: Jan II. "Pokojný" z Rožmberka; 1434 – 8 November 1472, Ortenburg) was a member of the House of Rosenberg. He was governor (Landeshauptmann) of Silesia, and High Chamberlain in Bohemia.

== Biography ==
John's parents were Ulrich II of Rosenberg and Catherine of Wartenberg. From March 1445 to April 1446, he held several posts at the court of the Duke Henry XVI of Bavaria-Landshut. His father had abdicated in 1451, during his lifetime, and transferred his possessions to his sons. The eldest son Henry IV of Rosenberg was to represent his younger brothers John and Jošt II. Jošt II, being the second son, had joined the clergy, so when Henry IV died in 1457, John came to rule the Rosenberg estates. King Ladislaus the Posthumous appointed him as Landeshauptmann of Silesia in that same year. After Ladislaus's death in November 1457, John continued to serve as under the new king, George of Poděbrady. John had supported George's election, even though John was a devout Catholic and George was a Hussite. This led to clashes with John's father Ulrich II. It has been suggested that George may have bought John's vote, since he was a principal creditor of the Rosenberg estates.

At George's request, John and his army fought the battle of Jihlava. They won and on 15 November 1458 a peace treaty was signed, which obligated the City of Jihlava to pay tribute to King George.

The Rosenberg estates were heavily in debt, due to ongoing armed conflict and due to the conflicts fought during his father's reign. John had to pawn or sell several properties. On 4 March 1458, he pledged the castle and lordship of Helfenburk to John Popel of Lobkowicz. Later he sold Helfenburk to Mikuláš Přechov of Čestic, from whom he bought it back when his financial situation had improved. In 1464, he had to sell the town and castle of Rosemberg to John Popel of Lobkowicz. On 31 August 1459, he pledged a large part of his possessions to his brother Jošt II, though this may have been a sham transaction to confirm the solvency of the Rosenbergs.

In April 1459, John participated as advisor to the king in the negotiations that led to the Treaty of Eger, with, among others, Albrecht Achilles of Brandenburg, Elector Palatine Frederick I, William III of Thuringia and Frederick II. Among other issues, this treaty clarified the ownership of the lands of the Bohemian Crown in Germany.

Pope Pius II had allowed the Hussite George of Poděbrady to be King of Bohemia, in the interest of European peace. In 1464, Pius II died and his successor, Pope Paul II, declared George a heretic. This was the start of a political and religious conflict. Sixteen of the most influential Catholic aristocrats in Bohemia, John and Jošt II were among them, gathered on 28 November 1465 at Zelená Hora Castle, which was owned by Zdeněk of Sternberg. They founded the Catholic Alliance, led by Zdeněk and wrote a pamphlet accusing George of violating the law of the land. It is not known why John sided with George's opponents at this stage; he may have been influenced by hist brother Jošt. When John saw the intransigence and unwillingness to compromise on the part of the Catholic Alliance against the king, he joined the Royalists again, in 1466.

In May 1466, he brother Jošt invited him to switch to the Catholic Alliance again, or else Jošt would assert his claims on the possessions John had pledged to him back in 1459. Hilerius of Litomerice, the administrator of the Archdiocese of Prague, also called upon John to switch sides. In the spring on 1467, Zdeněk of Sternberg and Henry IV of Neuhaus declared war on the King. In May 1467, they demanded that John choose their side. He refused, and acted as envoy of the King to Emperor Frederick III later that year.

In July 1467, John besieged Jindřichův Hradec, but he received no support from the King. In the meantime, the Catholic Alliance began to destroy his property. In September 1467, John gave in, and began negotiating with the Alliance. He also asked the pope to lift his excommunication. In early October, he signed a preliminary peace treaty with Zdeněk of Sternberg and Henry IV of Neuhaus.

In a letter dated 13 April 1468, John attacked Emperor Frederick and threatened to defend his possessions against the continuing Austrian attacks. The Emperor and the Pope supported the Catholic Alliance's continuing attacks against the Rosenbergs. After John's army was weakened and his finances were running low, he agreed in the summer of 1468 to hold peace negotiations with the Alliance. On 31 August 1468 he finally committed himself to comply with the terms then had been negotiated on 22 August 1468 in Olomouc in the presence of the Hungarian king Matthias Corvinus and to secede from King George.

Already in September and October 1468, the armies royal of King George of Poděbrady devastated many of John's possessions. Other nobles saw an opportunity to enrich themselves and invaded John's lands. John lost large parts of his possessions until 1470. He had to pledge the remaining possessions to fund his defensive wars. His arch-enemy of Zdeněk Sternberg conquered Soběslav and Choustník castle. Zdeněk quartered Polish soldiers there, who began to raid the area. The Castle of Rosenberg, which John had pledged to John Popel of Lobkowicz in 1464, was conquered by Zdeněk of Sternberg in 1469. John Popel of Lobkowicz and his son Děpolt were captured and were held prisoner in Český Krumlov Castle.

On 3 May 1469, Matthias Corvinus proclaimed himself to be King of Bohemia. Later that month, he appointed John II as High Treasurer of Bohemia. After George of Poděbrady died in 1471, John received from Matthias Corvinus the Lordships of Bechyně and Kouřim and territories along the Vltava.

John wrote his first testament in 1457. In 1467, he wrote a second testament. He wrote the third and last on 8 November 1472, the day he died, in Ortenburg in Bavaria. In this testament, he appointed Reinprecht of Walsee and Bernard of Schaumburg as guardians of his children, who were still minors. He probably was in Ortenburg to visit the Count of Ortenburg.

Ten years later, John's son and successor [[:de: Wok II von Rosenberg|Wok II of Rosenberg]], married Margaret, the daughter of Burian II of Guttenstein, who was then High Treasurer of Bohemia, and Sidonie of Ortenburg.

John was buried in the family tomb in the church of Vyšší Brod Monastery.

== Marriage and issue ==
John was married with Anna of Glogau (Czech: Anna Hlovoská; died: 17 December 1483), a daughter of Duke Henry IX of Glogau. They had four sons and six daughters:

- Henry V of Rosenberg (d. 1489)
- Catherine (d. 1521), married to Peter Holicky of Sternberg (Czech: Petr Holicky ze Šternberka)
- Wok II of Rosenberg (d. 1505)
- Peter IV of Rosenberg (d. 1523)
- Barbara (born: 8 June 1460), married to Jonn of Biberstein (Czech: Jan z Bibršteina)
- Margaret (Czech: Markéta, born: 8 June 1460), Abbess in Český Krumlov
- Hedwig (Czech: Hedvika; died: 1520)

married firstly with Wolf of Grafeneck (Czech: Volf z Grafeneku)
married secondly with Dobesch of Boskowitz (Czech: Dobeš z Boskovic)
married thirdly with Gregory of Starhemberg (Czech: Řehoř ze Štaremberka)

- Elizabeth (Czech: Alzbeta; born: 14 February 1466), married to Henry Prüschenk of Stettenberg, Count of Hardegg (Czech: Jindřich Prüschenk Stettenberka z az Hardeka)
- Johanna (Czech: Johanka; died: 1482)
- Ulrich III Rosenberg (d. 1513)

== References and sources ==
- Anna Kubíková: Rožmberské kroniky. Krátky a summovní výtah od Václava Březana, České Budějovice, 2005, ISBN 80-86829-10-3
