= Blatná Castle =

- Zámek Blatná
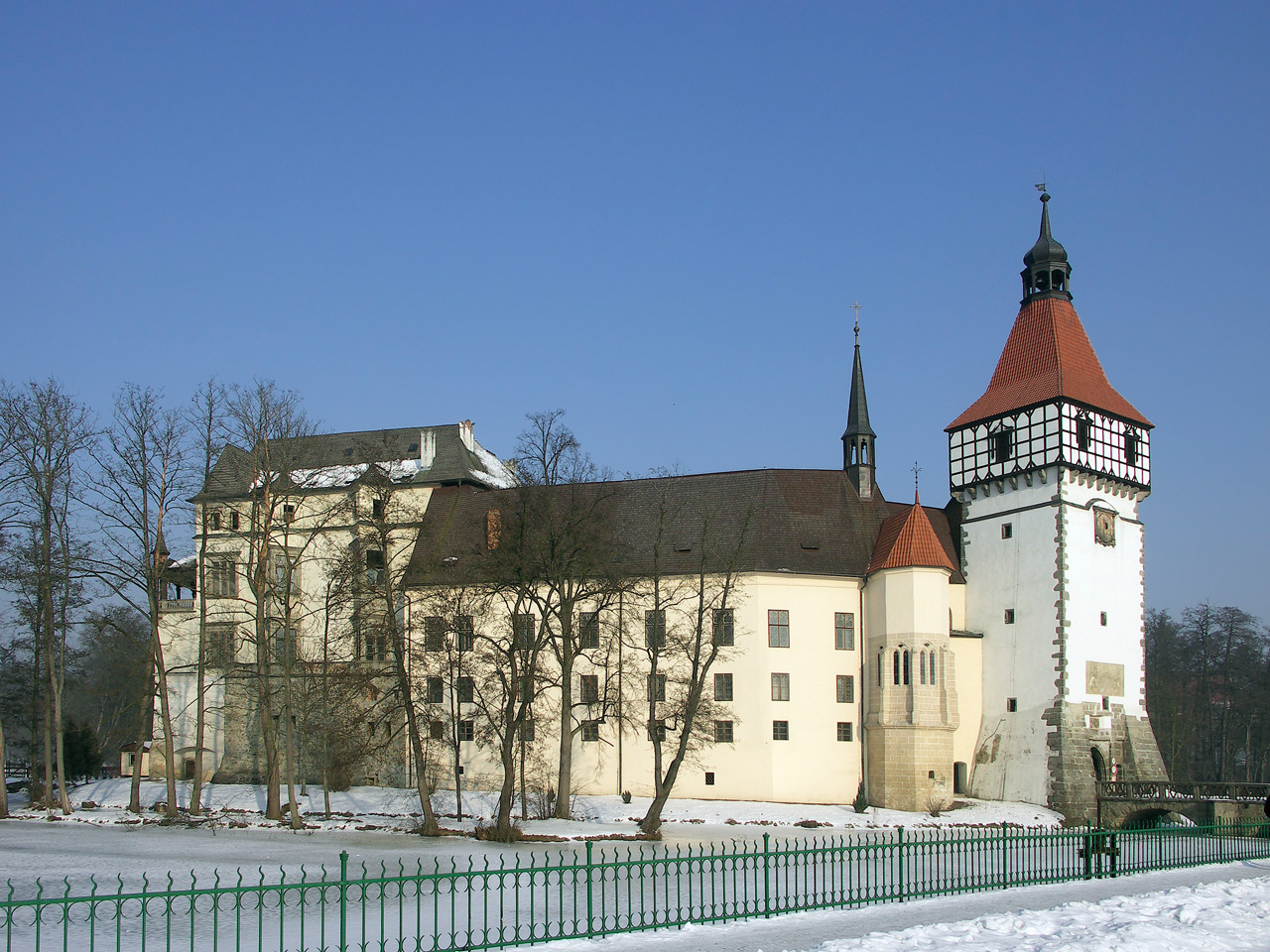
- South façade

General information
- Architectural style: Gothic, Baroque, Gothic Revival
- Location: Blatná, South Bohemian Region, Czech Republic
- Coordinates: 49°25′29″N 13°52′55″E
- Elevation: 440 m (1,444 ft)
- Owner: Hildprandt family

Design and construction
- Architects: Benedikt Rejt; Bernard Grüber of Munich

Website
- castle-blatna.com

Blatná Castle (Czech: zámek Blatná) is a castle in Blatná in the South Bohemian Region of the Czech Republic. Protected as a cultural monument, it is one of three preserved water castles in the country. The site dates to the 13th century, originally serving as a fortified stronghold. It was officially transformed into a Gothic castle in the 14th century, though its architecture reflects a blend of styles due to the different additions over the centuries. These include an early Renaissance wing, a Gothic palace, and the remnants of a 13th-century Romanesque chapel.

== Location ==
Blatná Castle is situated in the town of Blatná in the South Bohemian Region of the Czech Republic. It stands adjoined to an English-style landscaped park, overlooking the surrounding countryside and nearby former mining settlement. The castle lies approximately 65 kilometres (40 mi) northwest of České Budějovice and 78 km (48 mi) southwest of Prague.

== History ==
=== 13th century: becoming a castle ===
The earliest written mention of Blatná Castle dates back to 1235, when it was described as a fortress and the seat of Vyšemír, a member of the lesser nobility believed to be connected to the noble Bavors of Strakonice. By 1241, the site had acquired the official status of a castle and began to be associated with various knightly orders tasked with protecting pilgrims travelling to the Holy Land. Historical records suggest a connection between the castle and the Order of the Knights Hospitaller.

The Bavors of Strakonice, who maintained close ties with the Order for generations, are thought to have overseen the transformation of the original wooden fortress into a more substantial stone residence. This period saw the construction of the Romanesque chapel and the creation of the surrounding moat.

=== 15th century: Gothic renovations ===
In 1403, following the extinction of the male line of the Bavor family, Blatná Castle passed to their relatives, the Rožmitál family. Under the ownership of Jan of Rožmitál, the castle underwent substantial renovations, transitioning into a Gothic residence. One of the most prominent additions during this period was the distinctive fortified entrance tower. Throughout the Hussite Wars, the castle remained under Rožmitál control.

After Jan's death in 1430, his sons Protiva and Jaroslav Lev of Rožmitál inherited the estate. Jaroslav Lev, who later became Lord Chamberlain of the Kingdom of Bohemia, is best known for leading a diplomatic delegation of forty Bohemian nobles across European courts between 1465 and 1467 in a mission to foster peace in Bohemia. Inspired by the art and architecture seen on his travels, Jaroslav Lev commissioned further Gothic enhancements to Blatná Castle. These include an angled doorway and a Gothic chapel. His private study, located at the top of the entrance tower, was adorned with frescoes, some of which are still preserved today.

In 1508, Jaroslav's son, Zdeněk Lev of Rožmitál, commissioned the construction of the Rejt Palace, a three-storey Renaissance wing designed by the royal architect Benedikt Rejt. Rejt had previously worked on Vladislav Hall at Prague Castle and St. Barbara's Church in Kutná Hora as part of the King's Service.

=== 16th–18th centuries: changing hands and turbulent years ===
Adam Lev, the grandson of Zdeněk Lev of Rožmitál, inherited both the Blatná estate and the considerable debts incurred through his grandfather's expenditures. As a result, in 1555 he was forced to sell the castle along with the entire town of Blatná. Over the following decades, the estate changed hands multiple times before being acquired by Jan of Rozdražov, a member of the noble Polish family known as the Counts of Rozdražov. Jan died shortly after purchasing the estate, passing it on to his son, Václav of Rozdražov. Václav was responsible for the construction of the final Renaissance structure on the site – the Rozdražov Palace – built on the northern side of the wall, near the Old Palace and entrance tower.

In 1622, amid the military upheaval caused by the uprising led by Ernst von Mansfeld during the Thirty Years' War, Václav fled to Silesia, where he died in 1625. His widow, Anna Marie, would return to Blatná with their young son, František Ignác, who assumed management of the estate in 1645.

František Ignác died without an heir in 1691, ending the male line of the Rozdražov family. The estate was subsequently inherited by his nephew, Count Jan František Kolowrat-Krakowsky, the son of his sister Anna Kateřina. However, Count Kolowrat-Krakowsky soon sold the castle and estate to Countess Ernestina Serényi of the Hungarian noble Serényi family. The Serényi family owned Blatná Castle from 1695 until the end of the 18th century, and updated the Rozdražov wing of the castle in the Baroque style. During their tenure, the castle suffered a devastating fire that necessitated major reconstruction between 1763 and 1767.

In 1798, with no Serényi heirs remaining, the estate was purchased by Wenzel Karl (Václav Karel) Hildprandt von Ottenhausen, a nobleman from Tyrol.

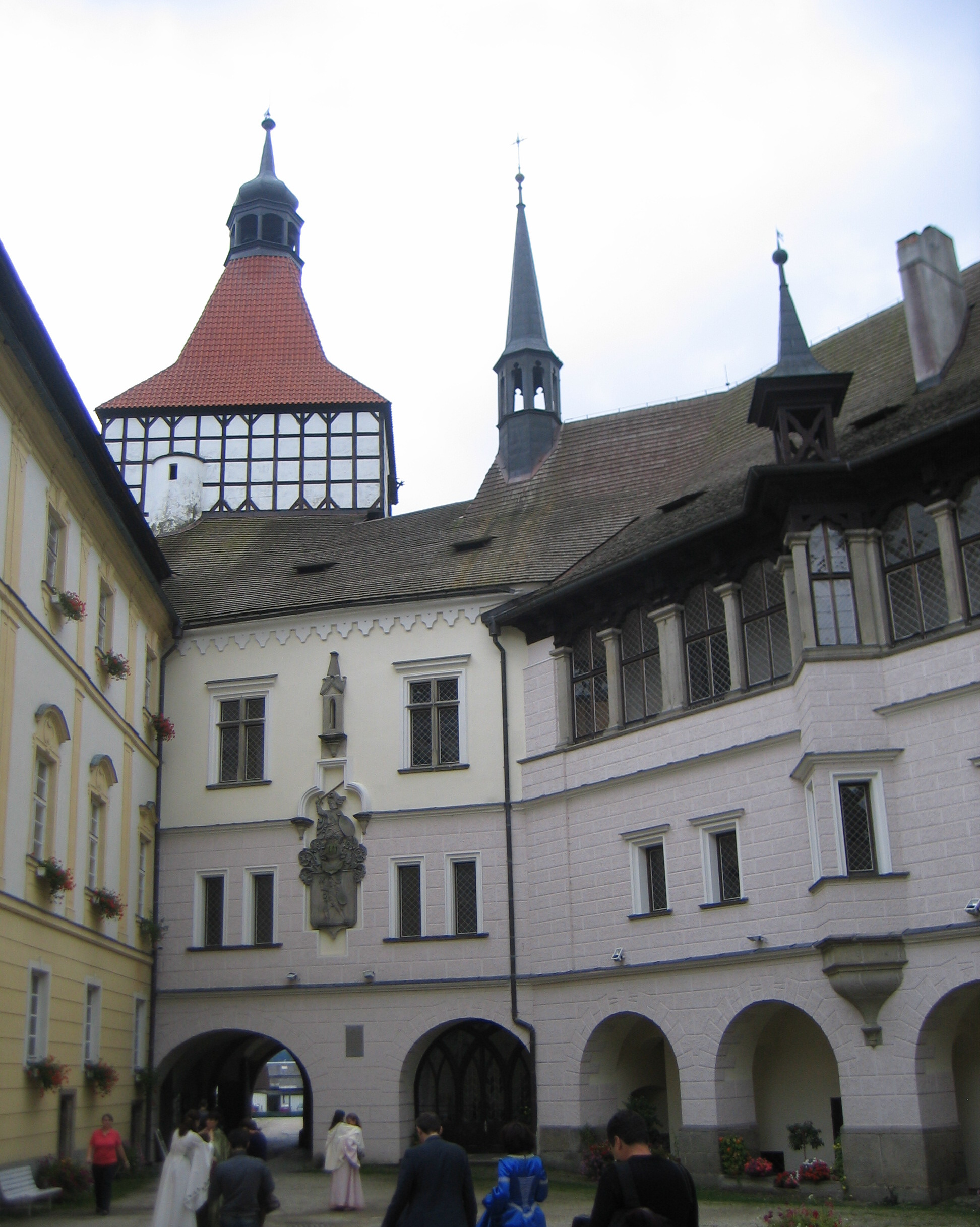
Courtyard

=== 19th–21st centuries: the Hildprandts and communist rule ===
Blatná Castle has remained in the hands of the Hildprandt family to the present day, except for a period of confiscation during the Czechoslovak Socialist Republic communist era.

In the early 19th century, Franz (František) Hildprandt began converting the castle into both a diplomatic residence and comfortable home. A granite plaque at the courtyard entrance commemorates Czech scientist Jan Evangelista Purkyně, who lived at the castle and tutored Baron Franz Hildprandt's children from 1810 to 1813. From 1850 to 1856, Robert Hildprandt oversaw Neo-Gothic renovations designed by Munich architect Bernard Grüber, giving the castle its present appearance.

The castle was taken over by the National Heritage Commission in the late 1940s and later seized by the communist government. In 1958, owner Friedrich (Bedřich) Hildprandt, his wife Cornelia, and their daughters emigrated to Ethiopia due to the family's ties to Emperor Haile Selassie I.

Following the fall of communism in the Velvet Revolution, the castle was returned to Cornelia Hildprandt in 1992. She shared ownership with her daughters, Josefina and Jana. Today, the estate is managed by Jana's son, Stephanos Germenis-Hildprandt.

== Architectural description ==
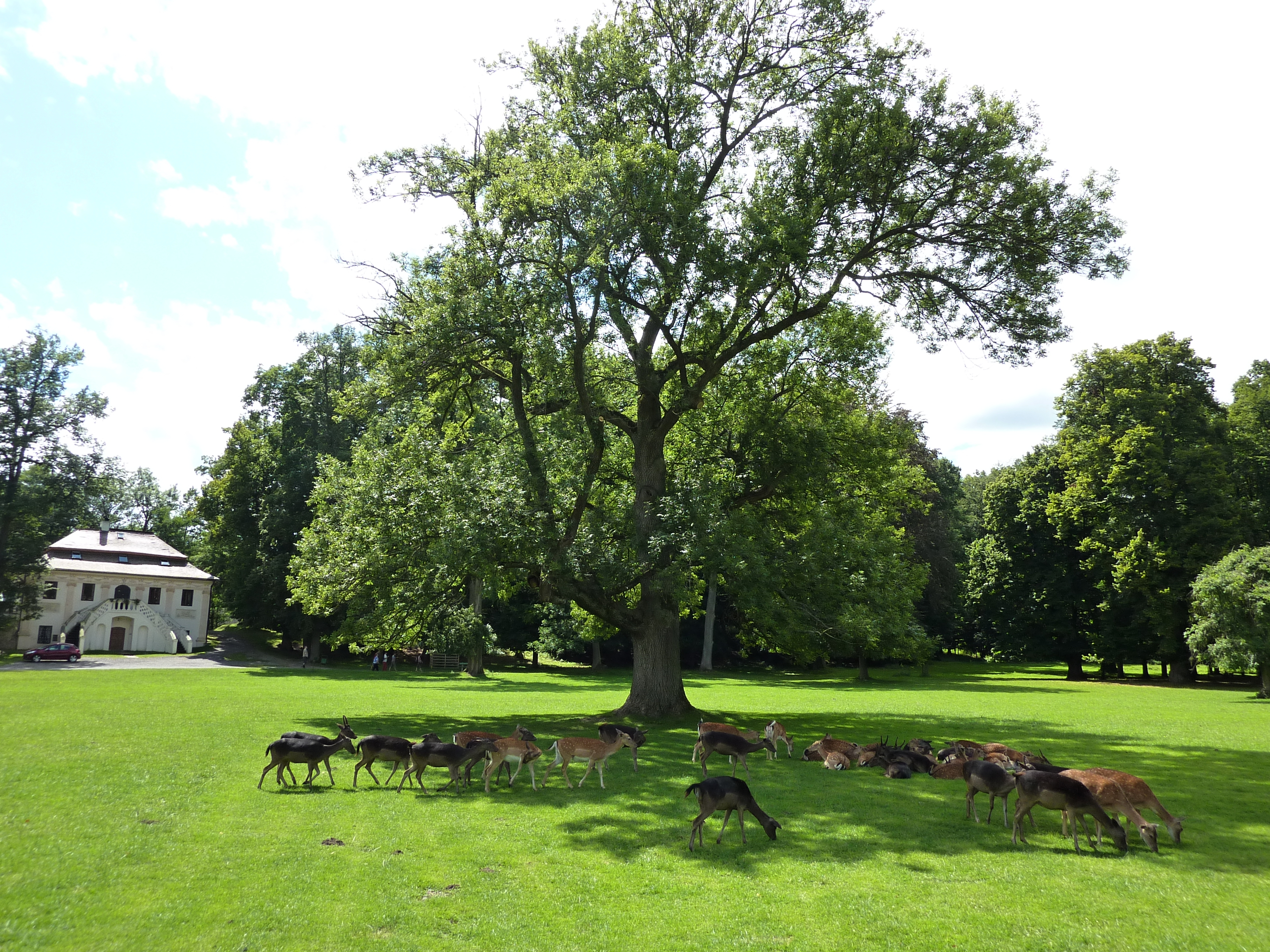
Fallow deer in the park

The castle courtyard is connected to a large English park with an extensive game reserve. In the 17th century, this park was one of the largest in Bohemia. The park was made into the English style by Franz Hildprandt in the late 19th century – preserving several centuries-old oak trees. In 1815, during the Napoleonic Wars, Franz Hildprandt employed locals to build an artificial cave. The castle park currently houses a herd of tame fallow deer, several peacocks, and a few alpacas.

Inside, the castle is decorated with hunting trophies as Ferdinand Hildprandt was an avid hunter. Chairs, tables, and chandeliers can be seen made from fallow deer antlers. Some of the oldest surviving features of the castle include a medieval lavatory and the well-preserved frescoes in the tower's Green Chamber, which date to the 15th century.

== In popular culture ==
Blatná Castle and its surroundings have appeared in a number of films:

- The White Lady (Bílá paní) (1965, director: Zdeněk Podskalský)
- The Incredibly Sad Princess (Šíleně smutná princezna) (1968, director: Bořivoj Zeman)
- Dívka s flétnou (2007, director: Jaroslav Hanuš)
- Křišťálek meč (2007, director: Jitka Němcová)

== See also ==
- Červená Lhota Castle
- Švihov Castle
- List of castles in the South Bohemian Region
