= Henry V of Rosenberg =

Bohemian nobleman

- Born: 25 June 1456
- Died: 21 May 1489 (aged 32)
- Noble family: House of Rosenberg
- Father: John II of Rosenberg
- Mother: Anna of Glogau

Henry V of Rosenberg (Czech: Jindřich V. z Rožmberka; 25 June 1456 – 21 May 1489) was a Bohemian nobleman. He was regent of the House of Rosenberg from 1472 to 1475.

== Biography ==
Henry was the eldest son of John II of Rosenberg and his wife Anna of Glogau (d. 1483). After his father's death in 1472, he inherited the family possessions. Until 1475, he administered the inheritance alone; from January to 24 August 1475, he administered it jointly with his younger brother Wok II. He then transferred the regency to Wok II for a three-year period and retired to Rožmberk Castle, probably because he had mental and psychological problems. We know that he had health problems from a letter by his brother-in-law Peter Holický to Sternberg to the Burgrave of Krumlov of 11 August 1476, informing the latter about the medical treatment necessary.

During his short reign, Henry sold the Lordships of Zvíkov and Milevsko to Bohuslav of Schwanberg. The decision to sell these possessions may have been a result of his psychological problems. Incidentally, the Rosenbergs acquired them by forging in 1437, during the reign of Henry's grandfather Ulrich II of Rosenberg.

Děpolt von Lobkowitz, who had been arrested by Zdeněk Konopišťský of Šternberk during the capture of Rosenberg Castle in 1469 and had been held prisoner at Český Krumlov Castle, was released by Henry in 1475 at the request of Joanna of Rožmitál, the widow of King George of Bohemia, after a financial settlement between the Houses of Rosenberg and Lobkowicz mediated by Bohuslav of Schwanberg.

Henry did not return to power, and died childless in 1489. He was succeeded by his younger brother Wok II.
