= Meinhard of Neuhaus =

Bohemian nobleman (1398–1449)

Menhart of Hradec
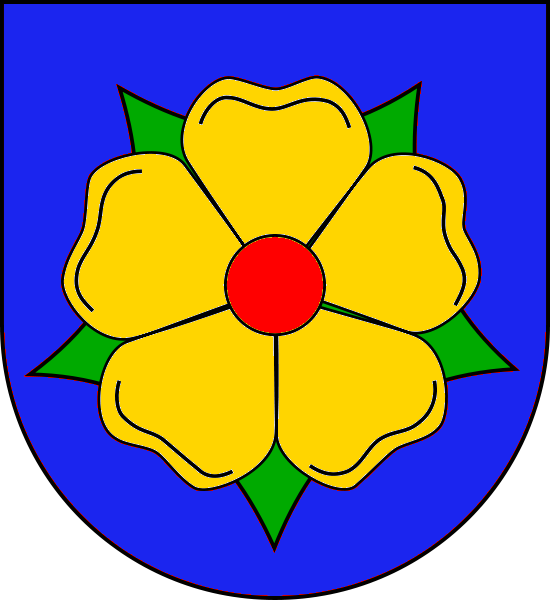
- Born: 1398
- Died: 3 February 1449 (aged 50–51); Říčany
- Buried: Parish church in Jindřichův Hradec
- Noble family: Hradec
- Father: John the Elder of Hradec
- Mother: Catherine of Velhartice

Menhart z Hradce (also known as Meinhard of Hradec, or Meinhard von Neuhaus in German; 1398 – 3 February 1449), was one of the leaders of the moderate Utraquists from 1437 onwards, and was colonel of burgrave of Bohemia. He was a member of the Hradec family, a branch of the Vítkovci dynasty.

== Life ==
His parents were John the Elder of Hradec and Catherine of Velhartice. Menhart's involvement in the administration of his parents' possessions began while his father was still alive. He was also interested in the public interest and made friends with his relative Oldřich II of Rožmberk. When his father died in 1417, he became a ruler of the Velhartic line of the Lords of Hradec. In 1418, he donated two altar priests to Neuhaus. Although his father has been as supporter of the Hussites, Menhart sided with the temperate Utraquists and the Catholic nobility. After the death of King Wenceslaus in 1419, he hoped that an extensions of the rights of the Estates of Bohemia would lead to a political renewal.

In 1421, his cousin Oldřich Vavák of Hradec died without male offspring. Menhart inherited the Lordship of Jindřichův Hradec (Neuhaus in German) and estates around Bílkov in Moravia. He moved to Jindřichův Hradec Castle. In July 1421, during the defense of Rabí Castle, he was taken prisoner by a Hussite army led by Jan Žižka and held for a while at Příběnice Castle.

During the siege of Křemže in 1423, Žižka sent Captain Jan Hvězda of Vicemilic with some troops to take Telč, where Zdeňek of Sternberg acted as guardian of Menhart's younger brothers John and Henry. Menhart came to the rescue, with John of Guttenstein and other nobles and 3000 infantry. He defeated Jan Hvězda in battle, reportedly killing 300 Taborites.

On 31 October 1425, Menhart fought at Kamenice (German: Kamnitz) against a Taborite army led by Prokop the Great and Bohuslav of Schwanberg. Afterwards, the Taborites devastated several Hradec possessions and the city of Počátky. In November 1426, Menhart and Prokop agreed to a ceasefire. Around this time, Menhart also reconciled with John of Hradec at Telč, the son of another nobleman with the same name, who legally owned half of Hradec. The father had been driven out of Hradec by Oldřich V and had fled to Telč.

In 1427, Menhart fought on the side of the Taborites, against the crusaders, who held their fourth crusade against the Hussites. The crusaders were defeated in the Battle of Tachov. In 1428, Menhart arranged a meeting between the Hussite leader Prokop and King Sigismund.

In 1431, Menhart fought in the Battle of Domažlice, below Herštejn Castle at Kdyně. The Hussites again defeated the crusaders and the willingness to negotiate a peace deal grew among both the Catholics and the moderate Utraquists. Menhart publicly distanced himself from the Taborites and at the Diet at Kutná Hora, he demanded that educated men be sent to the Council of Basel, where they should promote the acceptance of the Four Articles of Prague. The Taborites disagreed and then besieged the Catholic city of Plzeň, where the suffered a their final defeat in the 1434 Battle of Lipany.

After King Sigismund's return to Bohemia, Menhart with appointed colonel and Burgrave of Bohemia in 1437. He would hold the post of regent during Sigismund's absence. After Sigismund's death in December 1437, Menhart supported the candidacy of his son Albert II as his successor. In 1438, Albert was crowned King of Bohemia. Menhart fought on his side against the Tábor, which had opposed Albert's election. After Albert's death in October 1439, a delegation of nobles, including Menhart, George of Poděbrady, Oldřich II of Rožmberk and Hynce Ptáček of Pirkštejn offered the Bohemian crown to Duke Albert III of Bavaria, who turned the offer down.

Thus, the Bohemian throne remained vacant. Albert's widow, Elizabeth of Luxembourg, claimed the throne on behalf of her son Ladislaus the Posthumous. A religious conflict broke out again, between Catholics and moderate Utraquists on one side and the strict Utraquists on the other side. The captain of the Old Bohemian Circle, George of Poděbrady, led the moderate Utraquists. In 1448, he captured Prague and its castle. He successfully used military pressure to have himself recognized as the new ruler of Bohemia.

Menhart was taken prisoner on 9 September 1448 in the Old Town of Prague. He was initially detained in the Old Town Hall. Later, he was taken to Poděbrady Castle. The office of High Burgrave of Bohemia was given to Zdeněk of Šternberk. Menhart's son Oldřich (died 1453) demanded his father's release in a letter dated 20 September 1448. George of Poděbrady refused, and indicated the Meinhard would be tried in a court of law.

Menhart fell ill during the subsequent civil strife and was released on 1 February 1449, under the condition that he should surrender to the court when summoned. He died two days later at Říčany, on his way to Karlštejn Castle. His body was taken to Jindřichův Hradec, where he was buried.

On 6 February 1449, the Alliance of Strakonice was formed. Its members included Henry IV of Rožmberk, Zajíc of Hasenburg, John of Lichtenburg, Zdeněk of Šternberk, William the Younger of Rýzmberk and Zdeněk Kostka of Postupice. The alliance accused George of Poděbrady on 3 August 1450 of having poisoned Mainhard. This allegation was never proved.

== Marriage and issue ==
Meinhard married Margaret of Walsee. They had three son:

- John (Jan), died in infancy
- Ulrich (Oldrich) († 1453), married to Margaret of Pottenstein (Markéta z Potštejn)
- Henry (Jindřich) died in infancy
