= Rožmitál pod Třemšínem =

- Town
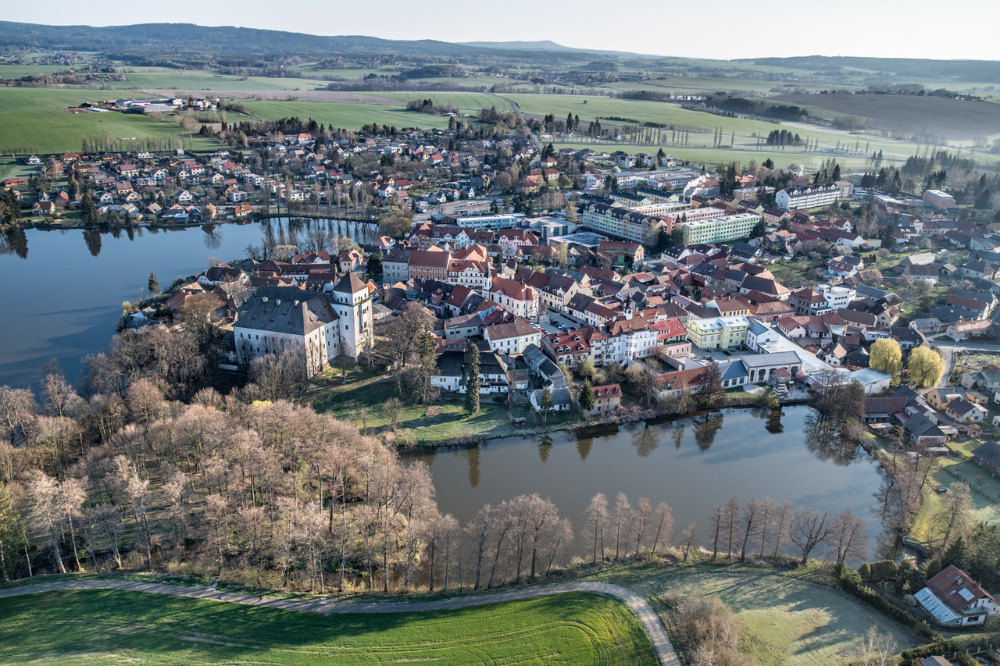
- Aerial view

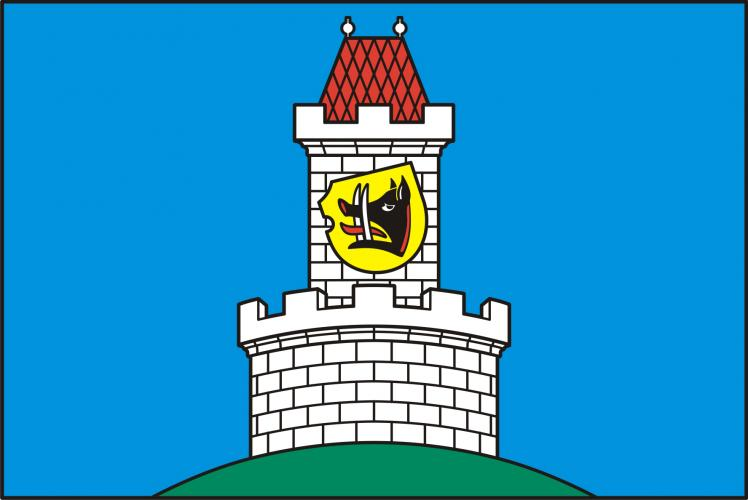
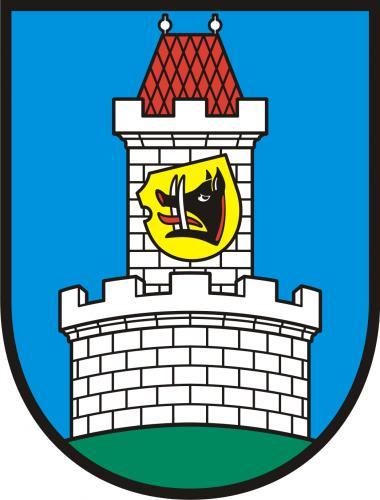
- Flag Coat of arms

- Location in the Czech Republic
- Coordinates: 49°36′7″N 13°51′52″E
- Country: Czech Republic
- Region: Central Bohemian
- District: Příbram
- First mentioned: 1265

Government
  - Mayor: Pavel Bártl

Area
  - Total: 53.01 km^{2} (20.47 sq mi)
- Elevation: 519 m (1,703 ft)

Population (2026-01-01)
  - Total: 4,255
  - Density: 80.27/km^{2} (207.9/sq mi)
- Time zone: UTC+1 (CET)
  - Summer (DST): UTC+2 (CEST)
- Postal code: 262 42
- Website: www.rozmitalptr.cz

Rožmitál pod Třemšínem (Czech pronunciation: [ˈroʒmɪtaːl ˈpot tr̝̊ɛmʃiːnɛm]; German: Rosenthal) is a town in Příbram District in the Central Bohemian Region of the Czech Republic. It has about 4,300 inhabitants. The historic town centre is well preserved and is protected as an urban monument zone. The most important monument in the town is the Rožmitál pod Třemšínem Castle.

== Administrative division ==
Rožmitál pod Třemšínem consists of nine municipal parts (in brackets population according to the 2021 census):

- Rožmitál pod Třemšínem (2,950)
- Hutě pod Třemšínem (110)
- Nesvačily (27)
- Pňovice (209)
- Skuhrov (43)
- Starý Rožmitál (370)
- Strýčkovy (95)
- Voltuš (227)
- Zalány (154)

== Etymology ==
According to legend, the castle that was built here was surrounded by rose bushes, and therefore named Rosenthal ('rose valley' in German). The German name was later transcribed into Czech as Rožmitál.

== Geography ==
Rožmitál pod Třemšínem is located about 12 kilometres (7 mi) southwest of Příbram and 60 km (37 mi) southwest of Prague. It lies in an outcrop of the Benešov Uplands, surrounded by the Brdy Highlands. The highest point is the hill Třemšín at 827 m (2,713 ft) above sea level, which already belongs to the Brdy Highlands.

The Skalice River originates in the western part of the municipal territory, then flows to the east through the town proper and supplies a system of fishponds there. The largest of these ponds is Podzámecký rybník. The Lomnice River also originates in the western part of the municipal territory, then flows to the southwest.

== History ==
The oldest part of the town is Starý Rožmitál ('old Rožmitál'), called the Old Town. Pottery from the 10th and 11th centuries was found here. The Rožmitál Castle was built in the mid-13th century. The first written mention of Rožmitál pod Třemšínem is from 1265. In 1349 it became a market town, in 1850 it became a town.

== Demographics ==
Historical population

Year	Pop.	±%
1869	5,082	—
1880	5,276	+3.8%
1890	4,856	−8.0%
1900	5,215	+7.4%
1910	5,037	−3.4%

Year	Pop.	±%
1921	4,546	−9.7%
1930	4,300	−5.4%
1950	3,608	−16.1%
1961	3,825	+6.0%
1970	4,119	+7.7%

Year	Pop.	±%
1980	4,578	+11.1%
1991	4,518	−1.3%
2001	4,357	−3.6%
2011	4,367	+0.2%
2021	4,185	−4.2%

Source: Censuses

== Transport ==
The I/19 road (the section from Plzeň to Tábor) runs through the town. The I/18 splits from it and connects Rožmitál pod Třemšínem with Příbram.

Rožmitál pod Třemšínem is the start of a short railway line to Březnice. However, the track is used only occasionally during the summer season for nostalgic rides of historic trains.

== Sights ==
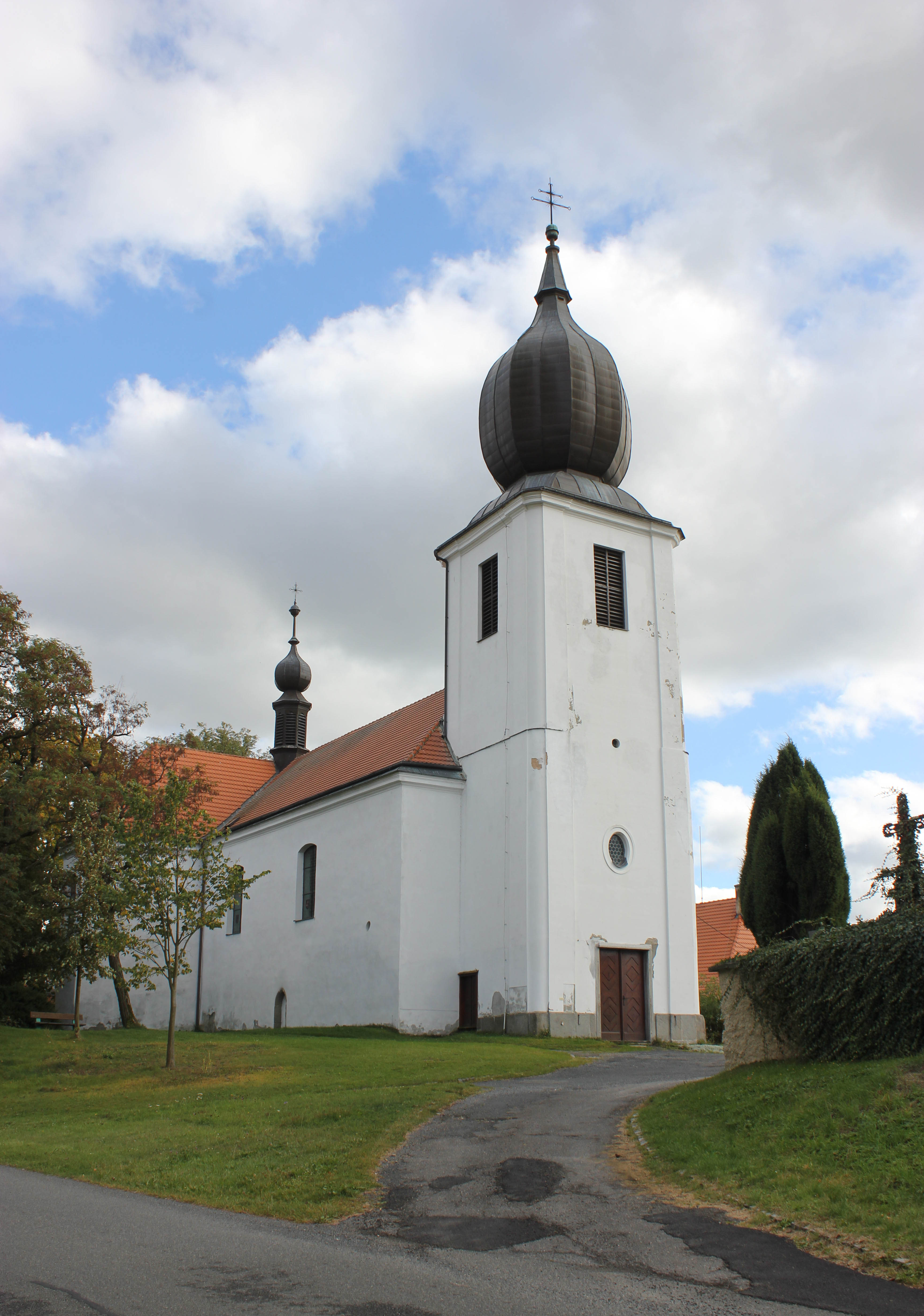
Church of the Exaltation of the Holy Cross

The most notable sight is the Rožmitál pod Třemšínem Castle. In the second half of the 20th century, it was used as apartments and offices, and began to fall into disrepair. Today it is being slowly restored to its original state and is partially open to the public.

The Church of the Exaltation of the Holy Cross is located in Starý Rožmitál. It was probably built in the first half of the 13th century and is the oldest monument in the town. The originally Gothic church was baroque rebuilt in 1729–1731. The church is associated with the work of Jakub Jan Ryba, who played Czech Christmas Mass here for the first time.

== In popular culture ==
The caste was used as a filming location of Nosferatu (2024).

== Notable people ==
- Jaroslav Lev of Rožmitál (c. 1425–1486), Bohemian nobleman and diplomat
- Joanna of Rožmitál (c. 1430–1475), Queen consort of Bohemia, second wife of George of Poděbrady
- Jakub Jan Ryba (1765–1815), composer and teacher; worked here
- Miloslav Vlk (1932–2017), prelate of the Roman Catholic Church; worked here
- Josef Černý (1939–2025), ice hockey player
- Eva Syková (born 1944), neuroscientist and politician
- Václav Hudeček (born 1952), violinist
