= John Tovačovský of Cimburg (younger) =

- Born: 1440
- Died: November 1483 (aged 42–43)
- Noble family: Tovačovští of Cimburg
- Spouses: Magdalene of Michalovic; Johanka Krajířová of Krajku
- Heir: Adam Tovačovský of Cimburg; Agnes Tovačovská of Cimburg
- Parents: John Tovačovský of Cimburg; Sophie of Kunštát

John Tovačovský of Cimburg (Czech: Jan Tovačovský z Cimburka, 1440 – November 1483) was an utraquist Moravian noble from the House of Cimburg. He was a butler (nejvyšší komorník) and chamberlain (nejvyšší zemský sudí) and belonged to the Unity of Bretheren.

== Life ==
He was born to the Moravian hauptmann John Tovačovský of Cimburg and Sophie of Kunštát. In the 1450s he married Magdalene of Michalovic with whom he had a daughter, Agnes Tovačovská. Agnes later married the widowed Henry IV of Neuhaus.

After the death of Tovačovský's brother-in-law Henry Kruhlata of Michalovic in 1468, Tovačovský inherited his estate (including the estates of Mladá Boleslav and Brandýs nad Labem and the castle of Hrubý Rohozec). He moved to Mladá Boleslav and began the reconstruction of the local castle. Later in the 16th century, under the ownership of John II of Šelmberk, the castle saw a Gothic conversion.

Tovačovský's wife Magdalene died on July 15, 1469. In 1477 he married Johanka Krajířová of Krajku, known for her support of the Unity of Bretheren. Their son was Adam Tovačovský.

=== Support of Vladislaus Jagiellon ===
John and Ctibor Tovačovský supported Vladislaus II Jagiellon for the Czech throne over Matthias Corvinus. They traveled to Kraków to improve relations with the Polish Jagiellons. On March 15, 1478 Tovačovský went to the peace conference in Brno as a delegate of Vladislaus. In 1475 Vladislaus promoted him to be the highest-ranking butler, and in 1479 the highest-ranking provincial chamberlain, in the Kingdom of Bohemia.

== Death ==
Tovačovský died on November 25, 1483. His possessions were inherited by his only son Adam, but they were managed by his uncle Ctibor Tovačovský until he came of age.
