= The Slav Epic =

Cycle of paintings by Alphonse Mucha

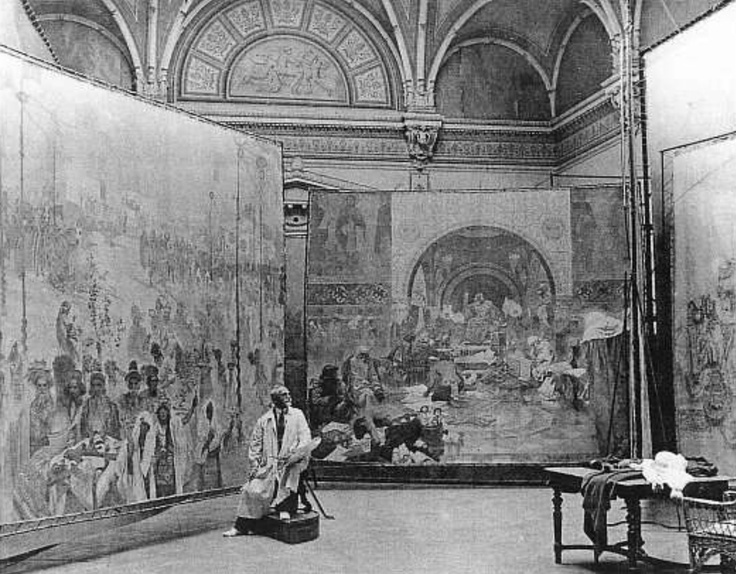
Alphonse Mucha working on the cycle in 1920.

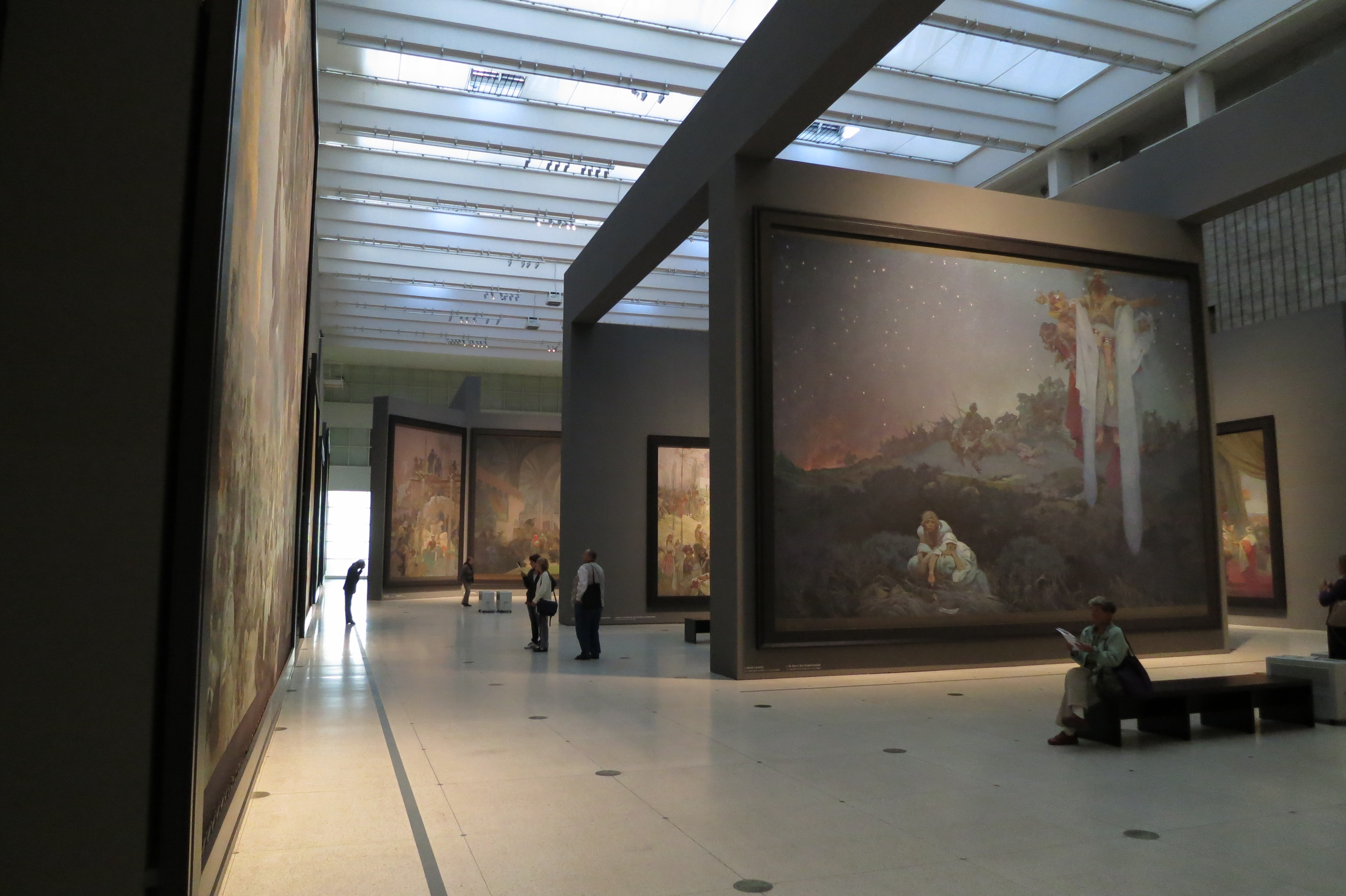
Mucha's The Slav Epic in the National Gallery of Prague

The Slav Epic (Czech: Slovanská epopej) is a cycle of 20 large canvases painted by Czech Art Nouveau painter Alphonse Mucha between 1910 and 1928. The cycle depicts the mythology and history of Czechs and other Slavic peoples. In 1928, after finishing his monumental work, Mucha bestowed the cycle upon the city of Prague on the condition that the city build a special pavilion for it.

Prior to 2012, the work was a part of the permanent exhibition at the chateau in the town of Moravský Krumlov in the South Moravian Region of the Czech Republic. In 2012, all 20 works were moved and displayed together on the ground floor of the Veletržní Palace until 2016, in an exhibition organized by the National Gallery in Prague (exhibition catalogue: Alphonse Mucha – Slovanská epopej). The works are currently on display back in the town of Moravský Krumlov.

== Background ==
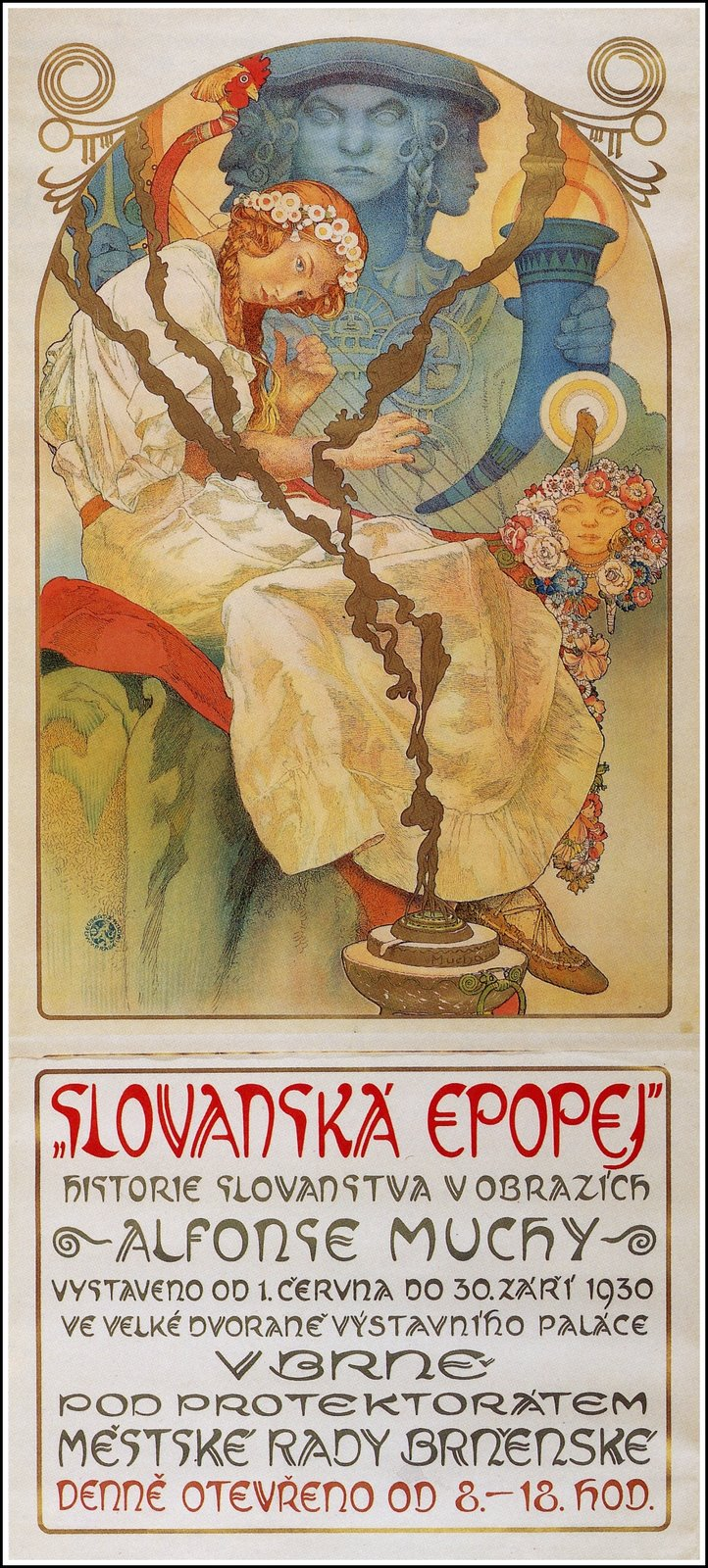
The Slav Epic 1930 exhibition poster

Alphonse Mucha spent many years working on The Slav Epic cycle, which he considered his life's masterwork. He had dreamed of completing such a series, a celebration of Slavic history, since the turn of the 20th century; however, his plans were limited by financial constraints. In 1909, he managed to obtain grants by an American philanthropist and keen admirer of the Slavic culture, Charles Richard Crane. He began by visiting the places he intended to depict in the cycle: Russia, Poland, and the Balkans, including the Orthodox Christian monasteries of Mount Athos. Additionally, he consulted historians regarding details of historical events to ensure an accurate depiction. In 1910, he rented part of the castle in Zbiroh and began working on the series.

Mucha continued working on the cycle for 18 years, gradually submitting paintings to the city of Prague as he completed them. In 1919, the first part of the series comprising eleven canvases was displayed in the Prague's Clementinum. In his opening speech, Mucha stated:

the mission of the Epic is not completed. Let it announce to foreign friends – and even to enemies – who we were, who we are, and what we hope for. May the strength of the Slav spirit command their respect, because from respect, love is born.

In 1921, five of the paintings were shown in New York and Chicago to great public acclaim.

In 1928, the complete cycle was displayed for the first time in the Trade Fair Palace in Prague, the Czechoslovak capital.

Alphonse Mucha died in July 1939. Shortly before his death he was interrogated by the Gestapo, as he was an important exponent of public life in Czechoslovakia. During World War II, The Slav Epic was wrapped and hidden away to prevent seizure by the Nazis.

Following the Czechoslovak coup d'état of 1948 and subsequent communist takeover of the country, Mucha was considered a decadent and bourgeois artist, estranged from the ideals of socialist realism. The building of a special pavilion for the exposition of The Slav Epic cycle became irrelevant and unimportant for the new communist regime. After the war, the paintings were moved to the chateau at Moravský Krumlov by a group of local patriots, and the cycle went on display there in 1963.

== Legal battle ==
The city of Prague has waged a decade-long legal battle over the work which intensified in early 2010. Much consideration has been given to relocating The Slav Epic from Moravský Krumlov (where it had been displayed for almost 50 years), to Prague. The hope was that Prague, a city frequented by many thousands of tourists, would attract increased attention to the series of paintings. However, there is no suitable space for the work in Prague's galleries. Therefore, some Czech state institutions, such as the Office of the President of the Czech Republic, found it preferable to leave the paintings in their current location since there have been few problems there. Nevertheless, in early 2010, the city of Prague requested the return of The Slav Epic for restoration work and subsequent display. However, the Mucha Foundation, run by the artist's grandson John Mucha and his mother Geraldine, blocked the move as it would simply be a provisional measure. The City of Prague argued that not Alphonse Mucha but Charles R. Crane was the owner of the paintings and that he has donated the cycle to the City of Prague. According to the newspaper Mladá fronta DNES, the information was proved by contracts found in the city archives. The Foundation is in talks with the City of Prague for the construction of a permanent home for the work.

On 25 July 2010, over a thousand people gathered in Moravský Krumlov to protest the planned move of The Slav Epic from the town.

After a two-year dispute between Prague and the Moravian town of Moravský Krumlov, the renowned cycle of 20 monumental canvases was—in a move protested by conservationists and art historians alike—taken for display at the National Gallery's Veletržní Palace in 2012 and remained there until the end of 2016. In 2018, nine of the canvases of The Slav Epic were shown in Brno during the RE:PUBLIKA Festival. The exhibition combined two opposing worlds of renowned Art Nouveau artist Alphonse Mucha's works – the majestic Slav Epic and a unique collection of posters.

The paintings were controversially taken on a two-year tour of Asia, returning to Prague in 2019.

== List of paintings ==
The work consists of 20 paintings, up to six metres tall and eight metres wide.

#	Image	Title	Subtitle	Representing		Completed	Dimensions
#	Image	Title	Subtitle	Location	Time	Completed	Dimensions
1		Slavs in their Original Homeland	Between the Turanian Whip and the Sword of the Goths	Polesia, Europe	Dark Ages	1912	8.10 m × 6.10 m 26 ft 7 in × 20 ft 0 in
2		The Celebration of Svantovit	When Gods Are at War, Salvation is in the Arts	Rügen, Germany	Middle Ages	1912	8.10 m × 6.10 m 26 ft 7 in × 20 ft 0 in
3		The Introduction of the Slavonic Liturgy	Praise the Lord in Your Native Tongue	"Veligrad" (? Mikulčice), Czech Republic	9th century	1912	8.10 m × 6.10 m 26 ft 7 in × 20 ft 0 in
4		The Bulgarian Tsar Simeon	The Morning Star of Slavonic Literature	Veliki Preslav, Bulgaria	10th century	1923	4.80 m × 4.05 m 15 ft 9 in × 13 ft 3 in
5		The Bohemian King Přemysl Otakar II	The Union of Slavic Dynasties	Prague, Czech Republic	1260s	1924	4.80 m × 4.05 m 15 ft 9 in × 13 ft 3 in
6		The Coronation of the Serbian Tsar Stefan Dušan as East Roman Emperor	The Slavic Code of Law	Skopje	1346	1926	4.05 m × 4.80 m 13 ft 3 in × 15 ft 9 in
7		Jan Milíč of Kroměříž	A Brothel Converted to a Convent	Prague, Czech Republic	1372	1916	4.05 m × 6.20 m 13 ft 3 in × 20 ft 4 in
8		Master Jan Hus Preaching at the Bethlehem Chapel	Truth Prevails	Prague, Czech Republic	1412	1916	8.10 m × 6.10 m 26 ft 7 in × 20 ft 0 in
9		The Meeting at Křížky	Utraquism	Slavkov Forest, Czech Republic	1419	1916	4.05 m × 6.20 m 13 ft 3 in × 20 ft 4 in
10		After the Battle of Grunwald	The Solidarity of the Northern Slavs	Grunwald, Masuria, Poland	1410	1924	6.10 m × 4.05 m 20 ft 0 in × 13 ft 3 in
11		After the Battle of Vítkov Hill	God Represents Truth, Not Power	Vítkov Hill, by Prague, Czech Republic	1420	1923	4.80 m × 4.05 m 15 ft 9 in × 13 ft 3 in
12		Petr Chelčický at Vodňany	Do Not Repay Evil with Evil	Vodňany, Czech Republic	1420s	1918	6.20 m × 4.05 m 20 ft 4 in × 13 ft 3 in
13		The Hussite King Jiří of Poděbrady	Treaties Are to Be Observed	Prague, Czech Republic	1460s	1923	4.80 m × 4.05 m 15 ft 9 in × 13 ft 3 in
14		Defense of Sziget against the Turks by Nicholas Zrinsky	The Shield of Christendom	Szigetvár, Hungary	1566	1914	8.10 m × 6.10 m 26 ft 7 in × 20 ft 0 in
15		The Printing of the Bible of Kralice in Ivančice	God Gave Us a Gift of Language	Ivančice, Czech Republic	1579	1914	8.10 m × 6.10 m 26 ft 7 in × 20 ft 0 in
16		The Last days of Jan Amos Komenský [Comenius] in Naarden	A Flicker of Hope	Naarden, Netherlands	1670	1918	6.20 m × 4.05 m 20 ft 4 in × 13 ft 3 in
17		Holy Mount Athos	Sheltering the Oldest Orthodox Literary Treasures	Mount Athos, Greece		1926	4.80 m × 4.05 m 15 ft 9 in × 13 ft 3 in
18		The Oath of Omladina Under the Slavic Linden Tree	The Slavic Revival	Czech Republic	1890s	1926	4.80 m × 4.05 m 15 ft 9 in × 13 ft 3 in
19		The Abolition of Serfdom in Russia	Work in Freedom is the Foundation of a State	Moscow, Russia	1861	1914	8.10 m × 6.10 m 26 ft 7 in × 20 ft 0 in
20		Apotheosis of the Slavs	Slavs for Humanity	Undefined	Future	1926	4.05 m × 4.80 m 13 ft 3 in × 15 ft 9 in

== See also ==
- Pan-Slavism
- List of works by Alphonse Mucha
