= Henry the Younger of Poděbrady =

Czech nobleman and poet (1452–1492)

- Born: 18 May 1452; Prague
- Died: 1 July 1492 (aged 40); Poděbrady
- Buried: Kłodzko
- Spouse: Catherine of Saxony
- Father: George of Poděbrady
- Mother: Johana of Rožmitál

Henry the Younger of Poděbrady (also: Henry the Younger of Münsterberg; German: Heinrich der Jüngere von Podiebrad or Heinrich d. J. von Münsterberg; Czech: Hynek Poděbrady or Hynek z Minstrberka; 18 May 1452 – 1 July 1492) was an Imperial Count and Count of Glatz. From 1462 to 1471, he served as Duke of Münsterberg jointly with his older brothers Victor and Henry the Elder. He also ruled Duchy of Opava jointly with his brothers from 1465 to 1472. Henry the Younger, held at times the office of regent of Bohemia and is also known as an author.

== Life ==
Heinrich the Younger of Poděbrady was a son of King George of Podebrady of Bohemia from his second marriage with Johana of Rožmitál. He received a humanist training and participated in knightly tournaments. His father, George, was King of Bohemia, but this crown was not heritable. George persuaded Emperor Frederick III in 1459 to appoint his eldest son Victor to Imperial Count. In 1462, Frederick also appointed Henry the Younger and his elder brother Henry the Elder to Imperial Count. Earlier, George had appointed his three sons Count of Glatz and enfeoffed them with the County of Glatz and the Duchy of Münsterberg. In 1465 he also enfeoffed them with the Duchy of Opava, which he had acquired in 1464.

In 1471, Henry the Younger married Catherine, the daughter of William III, Landgrave of Thuringia. His father died soon thereafter. Although Henry had stood at his father's side politically and religiously when he was young, he then turned to the Catholic faith. George's successor King Vladislaus II undertook to protect George's sons and to take over their debts. George's sons initially ruled his territories together, but in 1472, the inheritance was split. Henry the Younger received Poděbrady, Kostomlaty nad Labem and possessions in Silesia. From his mother he inherited Lichnice Castle, Mělník and Teplice.

At the state convention of Benešov in 1472, Henry was elected as the provincial administrator on the recommendation of his mother, who also took part. Unlike his mother, however, he sided with the Hungarian king, Matthias Corvinus. The reason for this was probably that Vladislas repaid his debts only slowly, while Matthias Corvinus did so without hesitation. In 1475, Henry sold the Lordship of Kolín, which he had received from his older brother Victor, for 20000 ducats to Matthias Corvinus, who stationed his Hungarian occupation troops there. After Henry appointed the Corvinus supported and despot Racek Kocovský as the administrator of Konopiště, Vladislas's supporters aligned with those of Matthias Corvinus. In 1478 it came to a reconciliation between Henry and Vladislas under the Treaty of Brno.

Henry prepared the agreement to appointment Vladislas as King of Bohemia and played a significant role in resolving various religious and legal disputes Bohemia. In 1488 he chose the side of the Silesian princes who rebelled against Matthias Corvinus. After the rebellion was suppressed, he had to assign his inherited possessions of Poděbrady and Kostomlaty to John Corvinus, an illegitimate son of Matthias Corvinus. Henry was, however, granted a life interest in these possessions.

Henry the Younger died in 1492 at the Poděbrady Castle. His body was transferred to Kłodzko (German: Glatz) and buried in the Franciscan monastery founded by his brother Henry the Elder. In 1558 he and eight other members of the Poděbrady family who had been buried there as well, were reburied in the church in Kłodzko. His main heir was Henry the Elder, who also took care of Henry's widow and her children.

== Offspring ==
- From his marriage to Catherine of Saxony, Henry had a daughter Anna (1471–1517), who married in 1493 with Henry IV of Neuhaus.
- With his mistress Kateřina Vojková of Štítary and Strážnice, he had several children, including Frederick, to whom he later bequeathed Kostomlaty.

== Literary activity ==
Henry was also active in literature. In his works he dealt with contemporary history, the conversion to Catholicism, property disputes and his political stance. His poems about happiness, virtue, chivalry, and wisdom are in the contemporary style of the late Middle Ages and early Renaissance. He translated several novels and wrote entertaining prose. In his travels with King Matthias Corvinus, he met many humanists. Through him, the works of Giovanni Boccaccio became known in Bohemia. He translated them from German, and even added some of his own.

== Literary works ==
- Májový sen (Maitraum)
- O Veršové milovníku
