= List of works by Alphonse Mucha =

This is a truncated, illustrated list of works by Alphonse Maria Mucha, and shows few examples of the many iconic images for which he is famous. The list does not include all of Mucha's 1910–1928 series The Slav Epic.

Title	Format	Year	Note	Collection	Picture
Gismonda, Theatre de la Renaissance		1894			
Luchon	lithograph	1895	advertisement		
The Judgement of Paris	lithograph	1895			
(untitled)	photograph	1895	Portrait of Paul Gauguin playing a harmonium		
Winter		1896			
Spring		1896			
Summer		1896			
Autumn		1896			
Salammbô	lithograph	1896			
Lorenzaccio	lithograph	1896			
Biscuits Lefèvre-Utile	lithograph	1896			
The Lady of the Camellias	lithograph	1896			
Biscuits Champagne-Lefèvre-Utile	lithograph	1896			
Monaco Monte Carlo	lithograph	1897			
Fruit	lithograph	1897			
Bières de la Meuse	lithograph	1897			
F. Champenois Imprimeur-Éditeur	lithograph	1897			
Nestlé's Food for Infants	lithograph	1897			
Savonnerie de Bagnolet	lithograph	1897			
Dance	lithograph	1898			
Bénédictine	lithograph	1898			
Medea	lithograph	1898			
The Rose	lithograph	1898			
Hamlet	lithograph	1899			
Moët & Chandon Crémant Impérial	lithograph	1899			
Moët & Chandon White Star	lithograph	1899			
Heidsieck & Co.	lithograph	1901			
Cycles Perfecta	lithograph	1902			
Maude Adams as Joan of Arc	lithograph	1909			
Princezna Hyacinta	lithograph	1911			
Moravian Teachers' Choir	lithograph	1911			
The Celebration of Svantovit	lithograph	1912	The second painting of The Slav Epic		
Window in St. Vitus Cathedral	stained glass	early 1930s			
(untitled)	watercolor	unknown			
