= Treaty on the Establishment of Peace throughout Christendom =

1462–1464 unsuccessful peace initiative

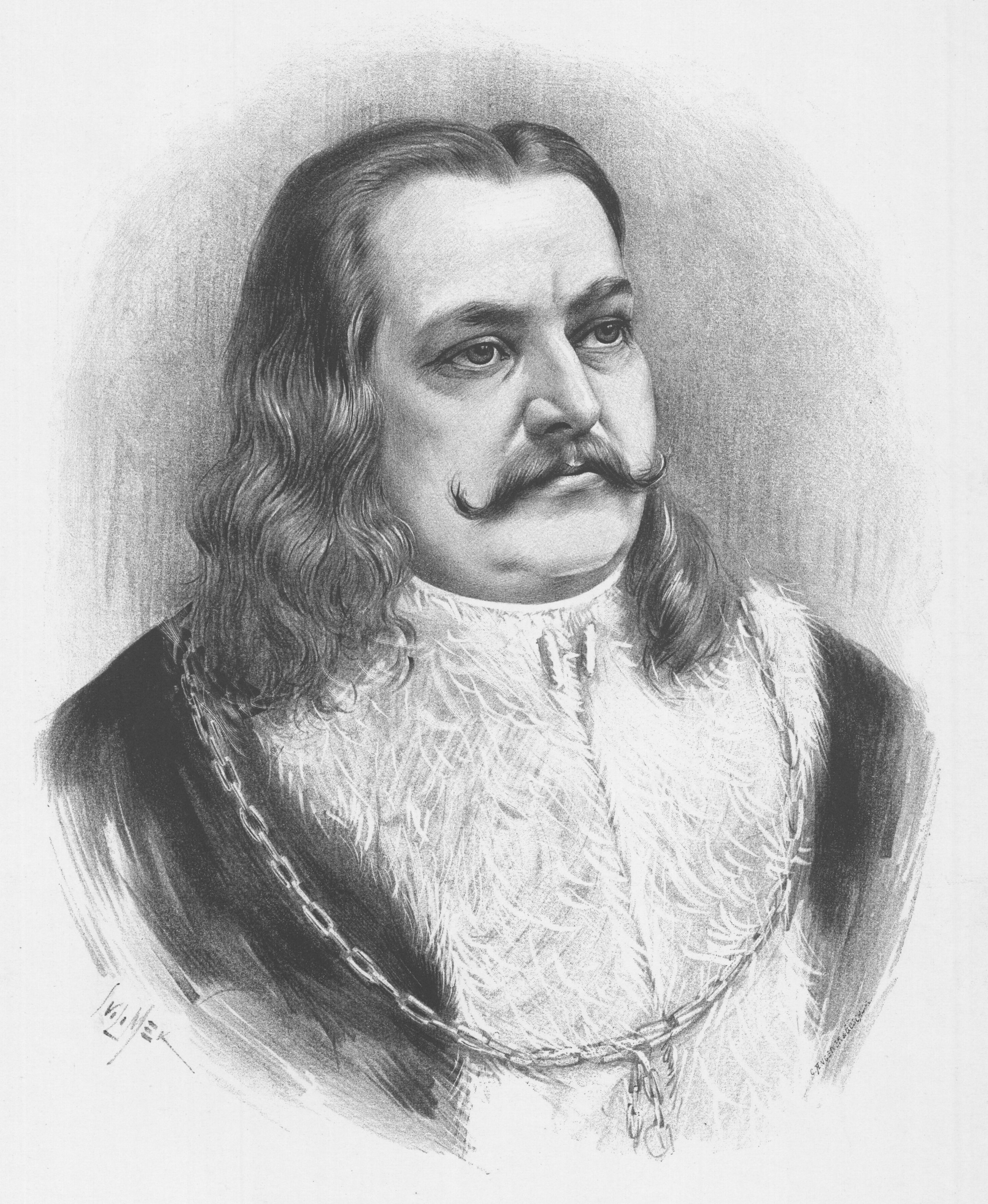
George of Poděbrady

The Tractatus pacis toti Christianitati fiendae, or Treaty on the Establishment of Peace throughout Christendom, was the unsuccessful project of universal peace initiated by King George of Bohemia in the 15th century.

The aim of the project was to achieve universal peace and cooperation within European Christendom. However, as a result, a necessary condition for the project's success was the abandonment of the medieval idea of a universal empire headed by the Emperor Frederick III and the Pope for the concept, for, up to that time unknown, a permanent union of independent and equal European states. The agreement as offered by George of Poděbrady, in addition to ensuring peace as far as possible throughout Europe, served primarily to insure the safety of the Kingdom of Bohemia against attacks from neighboring countries. Another reason, however, was the desire to gain possible powerful allies in the impending conflict against the Papacy.

== History ==
=== Diplomatic mission of Antoina Marina ===
In order to fulfill the project, King George of Poděbrady, between the years 1462 and 1464, sent a diplomatic mission from Prague to Strasbourg under the leadership of the humanist Antoina Marina of Grenoble. Over the course of these 2 years, negotiations were held with Matthias Corvinus of Hungary and Casimir IV Jagiellon of Poland and Lithuania, alongside repeated visits to the Republic of Venice, and visits to the Kingdom of France, the Duchy of Burgundy, the Margraviate of Brandenburg, and the Electorate of Saxony.

However, the project only was of interest to the German princes, Casimir IV Jagiellon, and Louis XI of France. The Venetians refused to accept the treaty without the approval of the Papacy, whilst Mathias Corvinus had been bribed through papal subsidies, and the Duke of Burgundy, as the rival of France at the time, opted to take a cold stance on the matter. Even a secret message intended specifically for France, led by both Antoina Marina and Albrecht Kostka of Potsdam, was not successful due to political intrigue and Papal pressure. Louis XI ultimately only agreed to a bilateral friendship treaty.

=== Pilgrimage-promotional expedition ===
Barely a few months after returning to Bohemia, George of Poděbrady sent another diplomatic mission to garner support from other European countries, this time led by his brother-in-law, Jaroslav Lev of Rožmitál. He received a draft of the treaty alongside passports for his travels from his sister, Queen Joanna of Rožmitál and Frederick III, Holy Roman Emperor. As Jaroslav was a devout Catholic in stark contrast to his brother-in-law, the expedition was intended not only to serve as a pilgrimage for him, but also as a means to show that the Kingdom of Bohemia was not a nation of heretics and peasant robbers, and to instead paint the picture that it was a realm of devout orthodox believers. The expedition left Prague on 26 November 1465 and consisted of 40 Bohemian lords and 52 knights, among them being Bořita II of Martinice, Burian of Švamberka, and Jan II Žehrovský of Kolovrat. In Nuremberg, the merchant and banker Gabriel Tetzel of Gräfenbergu, who wrote a travelogue regarding the expedition, joined the delegation. Tetzel was likely also in charge of the financial management for the expedition. The first of the rulers visited by the delegation was Phillip the Good of Burgundy, in Brussels. Whilst in Brussels, Jaroslav was the first Czech to be bestowed the honor of being a Knight of the Golden Fleece.

Following their stay in Burgundy, the delegation next visited King Edward IV of England in London, Louis XI once more in France, Henry IV in Castile, John II in Aragon, Afonso V in Portugal, Galeazzo Maria Sforza in Milan, the Doge of Venice, Cristoforo Moro, and lastly, the Holy Roman Emperor Frederick III in Graz. Over the course of the year-and-a-half long journey, the delegation also visited the cities of Santiago de Composteia and Finistère, then seen as the westernmost extent of the world. Whilst it had been planned to visit Mathias Corvinus, he refused the delegation entry due to being an enemy of George of Poděbrady, as the Bohemian War (1467–1471) had just begun due to Pope Paul II's excommunication of the Bohemian royal family and the following rebellion of the Czech Catholic estates, who elected Mathias Corvinus as King. As a result, the delegation, which had planned to return to Bohemia through Moravia, instead had to change route and returned to Prague through Jaroslav's estates in Blatná. Upon their return, the envoys were met by Jan Rokycana and university professors.

== Causes of failure ==
The plan of King George of Poděbrady was proposed in the form of a multilateral agreement; this differed from conventional international instruments of the Middle Ages, which in general remained bilateral. The Project in determining the contractual terms of this agreement would have bound together the parties at issue with similar rights and responsibilities for the achieving of common goals. All this gives reason to assert that the Treaty on the Establishment of Peace throughout Christendom was the first multilateral treaty to have been closest in design to modern ones, which is also a large factor in the failure to garner support for the project.

Additionally, another factor in the failure of the project was its inherent exclusion of the Holy See. By excluding the Holy See in such an important plan, George of Poděbrady alienated individuals who may have otherwise given their full approval for the project. Partially as a result, Pope Paul II excommunicated George of Poděbrady on 23 December 1466, and declared him deposed as King of Bohemia, releasing all of his subjects from their oaths of allegiance, leading to the Bohemian-Hungarian War (1468–1478).

It is seen as one of historical visions of European unity forgoing the European Union, such as by Anthony D. Smith, a prominent scholar of nationalism.

== Bibliography ==
- Treaty on the Establishment of Peace throughout Christendom. Edit. Kejř J., Transl. Dvořák I. In VANĚČEK V., The Universal Peace Organization of King George of Bohemia a fifteenth Century Plan for World Peace 1462 / 1464. Prague: Publishing House of the Czechoslovak Academy of Sciences 1964, p. 81-9
- Cultus Pacis. Studies and documents of the Symposium Pragense Cultus Pacis 1464–1964. Ed. Václav Vaněček. Prague 1966.
- Boubín, Jaroslav, et al., Searching for a New Europe. King George's Project. Prague, Historical Institute, 2015. 292 pp. ISBN ISBN 978-80-7286-263-4.
- Kotlárová, Simona. Páni z Rožmitálu . České Budějovice: Veduta, 2008. 256 p. ISBN ISBN 978-80-86829-37-1.
- Anthony D. Smith. "National Identity and the Idea of European Unity" International Affairs, Vol. 68, No. 1 (Jan., 1992), pp. 55–76

== See also ==
- Westphalian system
