= Henry IV of Neuhaus =

Czech nobleman

- Born: 13 April 1442
- Died: 17 January 1507 (aged 64)
- Noble family: von Neuhaus
- Spouses: Elizabeth of Sternberg; Agnes of Cimburg; Magdalena of Gleichen; Anna of Poděbrady
- Father: John of Neuhaus and Telč
- Mother: Catherine of Sternberg

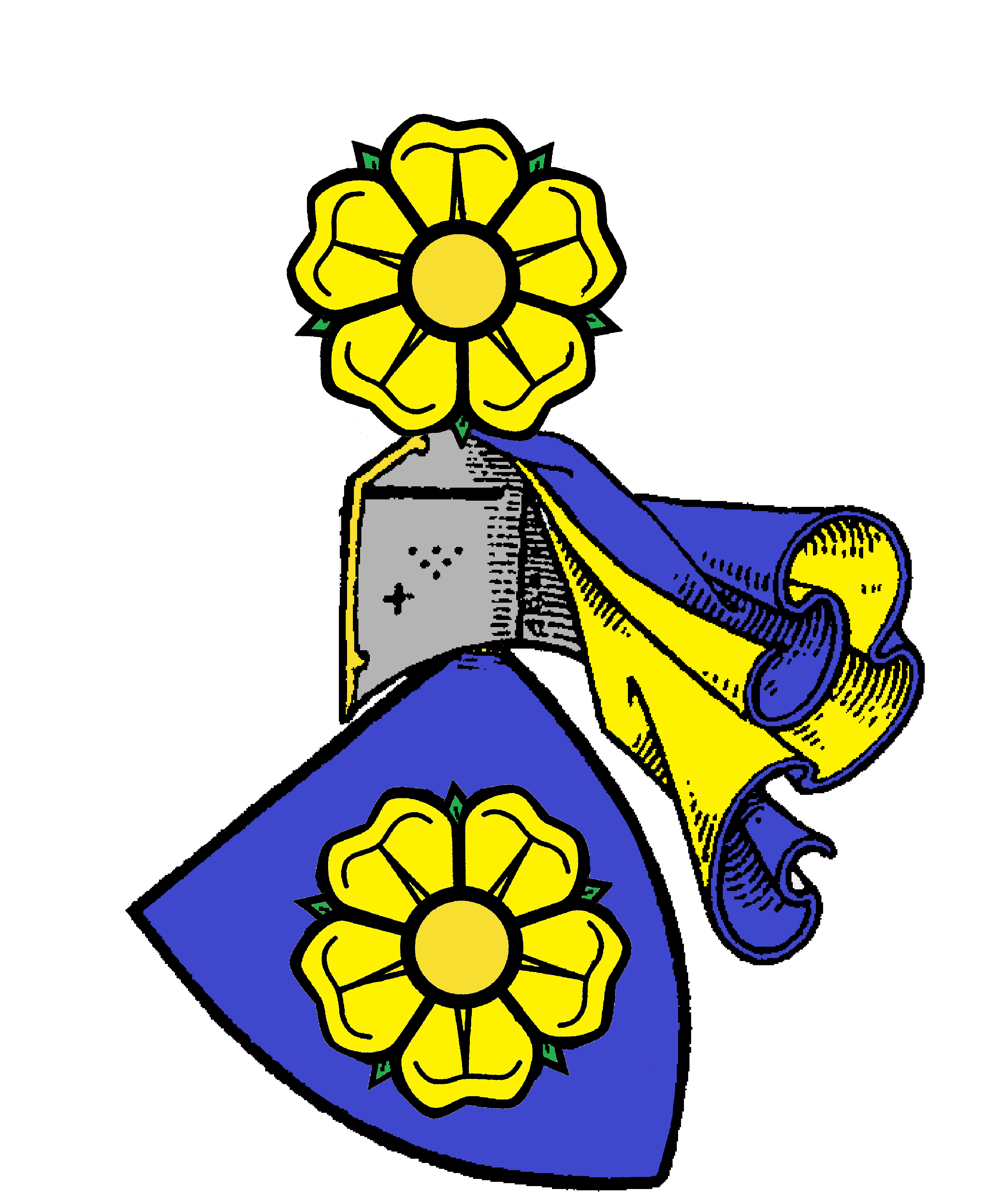
Gentlemen from Hradec, old coat of arms.png

Henry IV of Neuhaus (also known as Henry IV of Hradec; Czech: Jindřich IV. z Hradce; 13 April 1442 – 17 January 1507), was a member of the Telč branch of the noble von Neuhaus family. He was High Treasurer of Bohemia from 1485 to 1503 and Highest Burgrave of the Prague Castle (1503–1507).

== Life ==
His parents were John of Neuhaus and Telč (1419–1451) and Catherine of Sternberg. In 1453, Ulrich von Neuhaus, a son of Meinhard of Neuhaus, died without male offspring, and his possessions were inherited by Henry IV and his brother Hermann. However, Hermann died young in 1464.

When Henry IV came of age in 1464, he became to sole ruler of the family possessions. He managed to reduce the family debt and to round off his territory by acquiring twelve small manors, making him one of the largest land-owners in Bohemia and Moravia. His possessions included Jindřichův Hradec (German: Neuhaus), Telč, Počátky, Slavonice and many villages and towns in the associated Lordships.

Henry resided at Jindrichuv Hradec Castle. He was one of the most influential members of the von Neuhaus family and attained high state offices. From 1485 to 1503 he was High Treasurer of Bohemia; from 1503 to 1507, he was Burgrave of Prague Castle. On 17 January 1507 he was killed while hunting.

== Family ==
Henry's first marriage was with Elizabeth of Sternberg; his second wife was Agnes of Cimburg (d. 1485). His third marriage was with Magdalena of Gleichen, and after her death in 1492, he married Anna of Poděbrady, the daughter of Duke Henry the Younger Münsterberg-Oels.

From his fourth marriage, he had two children

- Adam I (d. 1531)
- Anna (d. 1570), who married

firstly with Hynek Boček of Kunštát (d. 1518),
secondly with Ladislav of Sternberg and Bechyně (d. 1521)
thirdly with Henry VII of Rosenberg (d. 1526)
