= Lev of Rožmitál =

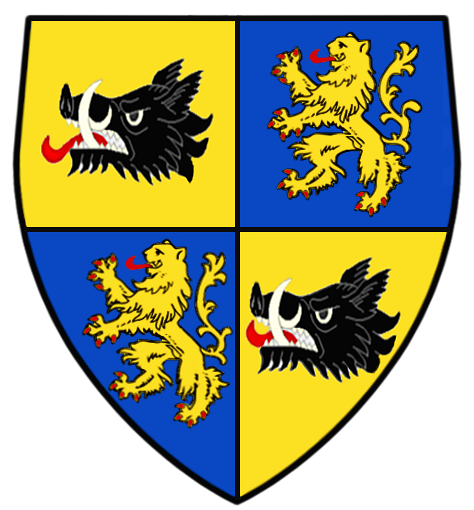
Lords of Rožmitál coat of arms

Lev of Rožmitál (Czech: Lvové z Rožmitálu, German: Lev von Rosental) was a Bohemian noble family. They named themselves after the Rožmitál Castle. They held the castles Rožmitál, Blatná and Buzice.

== History ==
This family came of an ancient and noble Buzici clan – boyars, members of higher Slavic nobility. Omeljan Pritsak concluded in research about the Attila clan of the Hunnic Empire that the religious suffix 'sig' when combined with Hunnic 'Buz' would mean "Wild Boar like-man", a symbol in the family emblem. In addition she thinks that the movement of the Slavs in Europe is accompanied under the leadership of the ruling class of Huns, whose language gradually melted into Slavonic.

Greatest power has the family in the 15th century. In the days of King George of Poděbrady, of King Vladislaus II of Hungary and his successor King Louis II of Hungary, they were one of the most influential families in the Kingdom of Bohemia. The last effort to keep the power of the family was the marriage between the grandson of Queen Joanna of Rožmitál, Adam I of Hradec, with the grand daughter of Jaroslav Lev of Rožmitál, Anna of Rožmitál and Blatná.

Gradually the family lost their power, moved to Moravia and finally became part of the stock that emigrated to Poland after the Battle of White Mountain and the events in 1626.

== Coat of arms ==
A shield divided by a cross. In the first and third quadrant are golden lions, in the second and fourth quadrant golden heads of wild boar.
