= Jaroslav Lev of Rožmitál =

Jaroslav Lev of Rožmitál (c. 1425 – 23 October 1486) was a Bohemian nobleman from the Lev of Rožmitál family. This family came of an ancient and noble Buzice stock. In addition to the family castle in Rožmitál they also held the Castles Blatná and Buzice.

== Biography ==
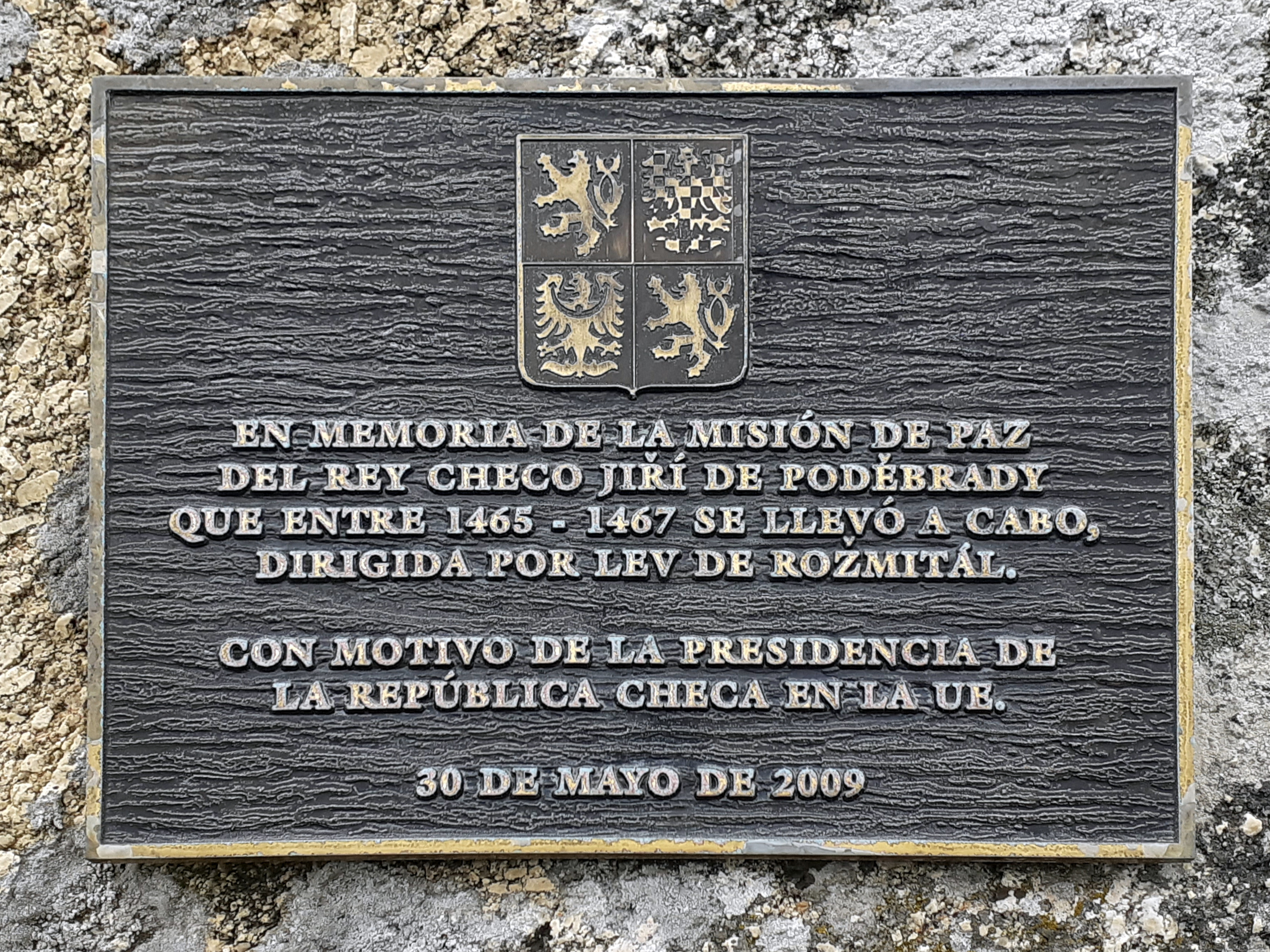
Plaque in Cape Finisterre commemorating the peace mission of George of Podebrady and the travel of Jaroslav Lev of Rožmitál

Very little is known of Jaroslav's youth, but he was trained a soldier. He was probably a member of the Czech expedition, as a soldier of fortune in the invasion of Władysław III of Poland in Ottoman territory and took part in the Battle of Varna in 1444. His wife came from the family of the Bezdružický of Kolowrat.

King of Bohemia George of Poděbrady was Hussite and Lev was a devout Catholic and they were in opposing camps but when Lev's sister Johana of Rožmitál married George Poděbrad in 1450, Lev was loyal to his royal brother-in-law. The King was anxious to ease his quarrel with the Papacy and between 1465 and 1467 Lev undertook diplomatic travels on behalf of the King through Europe to the Cape Finisterre. Jaroslav was leader of a delegation of 40 nobles and knights with 52 horses. He made himself a name for jousting, and also tried to purge the reputation of Bohemia, which was damaged by the Hussite wars. The legacy toured Germany, Belgium, England, France, Spain, Portugal and met in Venice at the end. After the visit of the Emperor Frederick III, they returned to Bohemia. Jaroslav was the figurehead of the message of peace to the European countries. This is considered as the first step to the European Community. The main purpose of his trip was to build unity between the free Christian Princes under the leadership of Louis XI of France and manage the resistance against the Ottoman Empire. The furtive reasons for the trip can be discovered in Šašek's Memoirs, notably the rumour that the King Władysław III of Poland had survived the Battle of Varna in 1444.

Upon his return, Jaroslav Lev of Rožmitál was appointed to the highest rank of Lord Steward of the Bohemian kingdom, from 1467 to 1469 he was also captain of the district of Písek.

The delegation was also accompanied by Gabriel Tetzel of Nurenberg, who later described the trip in his chronicle. Memoirs were also left his fellow-traveler, the knight Václav Šašek z Bířkova. A translation into the Latin language was made by Stanislaw Pavlovsky in 1577.

Jaroslav Lev of Rožmitál died in the 15th century, probably in 1486, and was buried in his castle in Blatná. The last effort to keep the power of the family was the marriage between the grandson of Queen Joanna of Rožmitál – Adam I of Hradec with the grand daughter of Jaroslav Lev of Rožmitál – Anna of Rožmitál and Blatná. Gradually the family lost their power, moved to Moravia and finally became part of the stock that emigrated to Poland after the Battle of White Mountain and the events in 1626.
