= Zdeněk of Šternberk =

Bohemian noble (1410–1476)

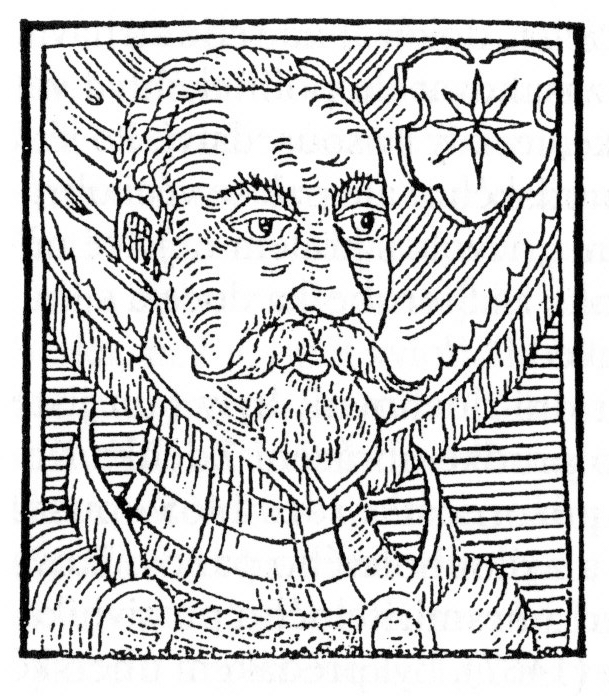
- Born: 1410
- Died: 4 December 1476 (aged 65–66); Wiener Neustadt

Zdeněk of Šternberk or Zdeněk of Sternberg (Czech: Zdeněk Konopišťský ze Šternberka; 1410 – 4 December 1476) was a Czech noble, diplomat and politician from the Šternberk family.
