= Joanna of Rožmitál =

Queen consort of Bohemia (d. 1475)

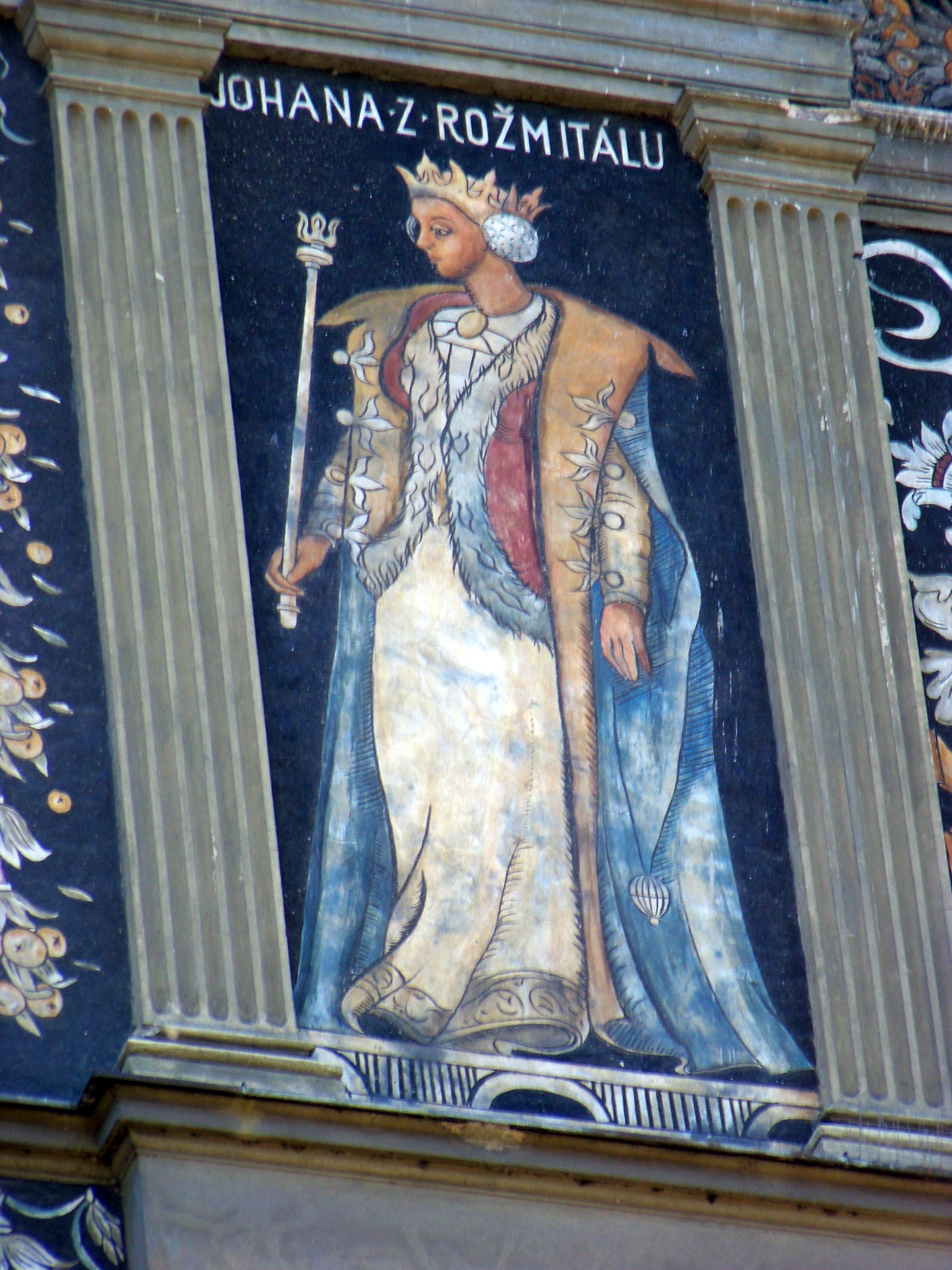
- Fictional portrait on facade of a Prague house

Queen consort of Bohemia
- Tenure: 1458–1471
- Coronation: 1458
- Born: c. 1430
- Died: 12 November 1475; Mělník
- Spouse: George of Poděbrady
- Issue: Henry, Duke of Münsterberg; Ludmila, Duchess of Brzeg
- House: Rožmitál
- Father: John of Rožmitál
- Mother: Ludmila of Strakonice

Joanna of Rožmitál (Czech: Johana z Rožmitálu; c. 1430 – 12 November 1475) was Queen of Bohemia as the second wife of George of Poděbrady.

== Life ==
She was a daughter of John of Rožmitál and his wife Ludmila of Strakonice.

=== Marriage ===
Joanna married George of Poděbrady in 1450 (the marriage was probably arranged by Joanna's brother, Jaroslav Lev because her father had died in her childhood), a year after the death of his first wife Kunigunde (Kunhuta), by whom he had six children.

Shortly after the marriage, in 1452, George became adept with the provincial administrator on behalf of future king Ladislaus the Posthumous. When Ladislaus died in 1457 of leukemia, people questioned who would succeed the childless king in Bohemia and Hungary; the main candidates to succeed were Matthias Corvinus of Hungary and George. George was eventually selected and crowned as King of Bohemia on 7 May 1458; Joanna was crowned the following day.

Joanna actively supported her husband in politics; she was not only a mentor, but she was personally involved in state affairs, being part of her husband's political agenda. Joanna, however gained recognition as an esteemed wife and mother. George later brought his children with Joanna and her stepchildren to court. Joanna's stepdaughter Catherine was even married off to George's old rival Matthias Corvinus.

Joanna's brother lent her passport to travel to Western Europe in the years 1465–1467. She left her husband for making the prayer book of King George. When the Pope cursed George, this applied even to his wife and all their children. In August 1470 she led the Czech armies fighting Matthias Corvinus for Bohemia, when all peace was broken after the premature death of Catherine.

=== Widowhood ===
George died in 1471; Joanna wanted to fulfill his political testament and helped to enforce acceptance of Polish prince Vladislaus Jagiellon on the Bohemian throne. In 1473 queen dowager and new king Vladislaus launched a provincial diet in Benešov, where they sought to remind to gathered Estates the political legacy of Joanna's husband and his constant effort to achieve religious tolerance and lasting truce between Catholicism and Utraquism in country.

After 1473 Joanna withdrew from political life and moved to the traditional place of Bohemian widowed queens, one of her so-called dowry towns, Mělník. She bequeathed six thousand threescores of Prague groschen for renewal of local royal collegiate chapter of St. Peter and Paul, defunct at the beginning of the Hussite Revolution.

Joanna died on 12 November 1475 at Mělník. According to her last will she wished to rest in local Church of St. Peter and Paul but other sources indicate that she was finally buried in royal burial vault beneath the St. Vitus Cathedral in Prague, alongside her husband George. Her funeral was also attended by king Vladislaus II.

Of her four children, only Henry (Hynek) and Ludmila lived to adulthood. Both of Joanna's surviving children went on to have their own children.

== Family ==
Joanna and George had the following children, only two of them lived to adulthood:

1. Henry (1452–1492) married Catherine, daughter of William III, Duke of Saxony
2. Frederick (1453–1458), died young
3. Agnes?, believed to have died young
4. Ludmila (16 October 1456 – 20 January 1503), married Frederick I of Liegnitz

== Notes ==
Joanna of Rožmitál Born: c. 1430 Died: 1471
Royal titles
Preceded by Elizabeth of Luxembourg	Queen consort of Bohemia; 1458–1471	Succeeded by Barbara of Brandenburg
