= George of Poděbrady =

King of Bohemia (r. 1458–71)

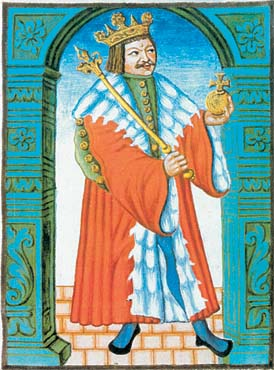
- George of Poděbrady as depicted in 1607

King of Bohemia
- Reign: 2 March 1458 – 22 March 1471
- Coronation: 2 March 1458, Prague
- Predecessor: Ladislaus the Posthumous
- Successor: Vladislaus II
- Born: 23 April 1420 probably at Poděbrady Castle
- Died: 22 March 1471 (aged 50); Prague
- Spouses: Kunigunde of Sternberg; Johana of Rožmitál
- Issue: Boček IV of Poděbrady; Victor, Duke of Münsterberg; Henry the Elder, Duke of Münsterberg-Oels; Catherine, Queen of Hungary and Croatia; Sidonie, Duchess of Saxony; Henry the Younger, Duke of Münsterberg; Ludmila, Duchess of Legnica
- House: Poděbrady
- Father: Victor of Munsterberg
- Religion: Utraquist Hussite

George of Kunštát and Poděbrady (23 April 1420 – 22 March 1471), also known as Poděbrad or Podiebrad (Czech: Jiří z Poděbrad; German: Georg von Podiebrad), was the sixteenth King of Bohemia, who ruled in 1458–1471. He was a leader of the Hussites, but moderate and tolerant toward the Catholic faith. His rule was marked by great efforts to preserve peace and tolerance between the Hussites and Catholics in the religiously divided Crown of Bohemia – hence his contemporary nicknames: "King of two peoples" (Czech: král dvojího lidu) and "Friend of peace" (přítel míru).

During the 19th century, in period of the so-called Czech National Revival, he began to be praised (even somewhat idealized) as the last Czech national monarch (in terms of ethnic awareness), a great diplomat and a courageous fighter against the domination of the Catholic Church. In modern times he is remembered mainly for his idea and attempt to establish common European Christian institutions, which is now seen as an early historical vision of European unity.

== Early life ==
George was the son of Victor of Kunštát and Poděbrady, a Bohemian nobleman whose ancestors were of Moravian origin, one of the leaders of more moderate faction (called Utraquists) of the Hussites during the Hussite Wars. George's mother is not known by name and it is likely that George was born out of wedlock; during his life he repeatedly heard ridicule from his enemies about his origin.

At the age of fourteen, George himself took part in the Battle of Lipany (1434), which marked the downfall of more radical Hussite factions (Taborites and Orebites) and the end of revolutionary phase of the Hussite movement. By that time he was already orphaned, as his father had died in 1427.

Early in life, as one of the leaders of the Hussite party, he defeated Austrian troops of King Albert II, who had succeeded King Sigismund as King of Bohemia, Germany and Hungary. George soon became a prominent member of the Hussite party after the death of Hynce Ptáček of Pirkstein, its leader.

King Albert was succeeded by his posthumously born son Ladislaus, during whose reign Bohemia sharply divided into two parties: the party faithful to Rome, led by powerful "viceroy" Oldřich II of Rosenberg, and the Hussite party, led by George.

After various attempts at reconciliation, George sought a military decision. He gradually raised an armed force in north-eastern Bohemia, where the Hussites were strong and where his ancestral Litice Castle was situated. In 1448, he marched this army, about 9000 strong, from Kutná Hora to Prague, and obtained possession of the capital almost without resistance.

Civil war broke out, but George succeeded in defeating the nobles who remained faithful to Rome. In 1451 the Emperor Frederick III, as guardian of the young king Ladislaus, entrusted Poděbrad with the administration of Bohemia. In the same year a diet assembled at Prague also confirmed the regency on George.

== Ruler of Bohemia ==
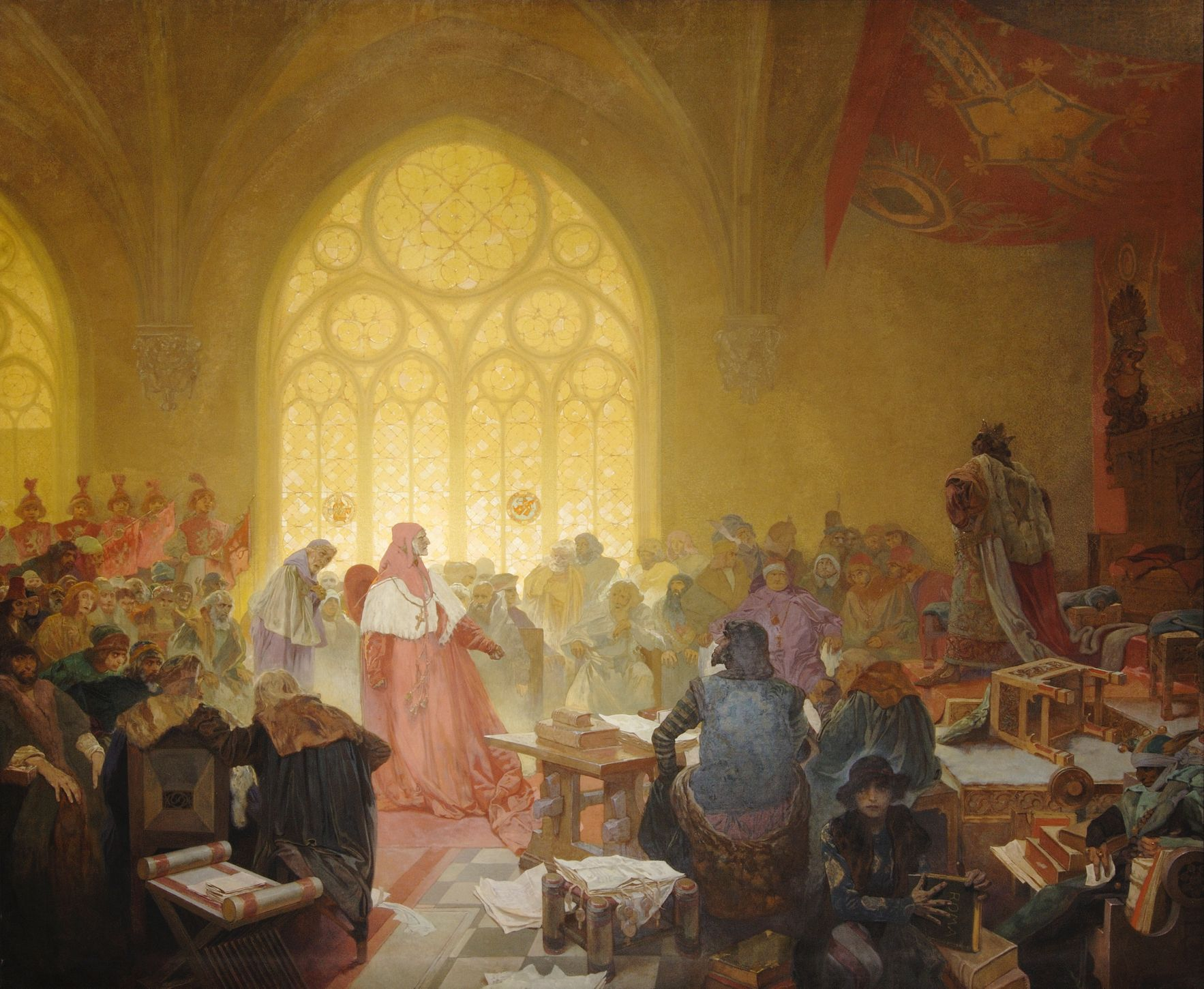
George of Poděbrady, "King of Two Peoples": Treaties Are to Be Observed. (1923) A painting by Alfons Mucha, part of his monumental cycle The Slav Epic, depicts papal nuncio Fantinus de Valle reminding to king his coronation promise to bring Bohemia "back to the womb of the true Church" and exterminate "heretics" (i.e. Utraquists / Hussites), while the king passionately objects that he isn't a heretic but maintain faithfulness to the faith – "according to his conscience"

The struggle of the Hussites against the papal party continued uninterruptedly, and the position of George became a very difficult one when the young king Ladislaus, who was crowned in 1453, expressed his pro-Roman sympathies, though he had recognized the compacts and the ancient privileges of Bohemia. In 1457 King Ladislaus died suddenly and some voices accused George of having poisoned him. However, research in 1985 proved acute leukemia as the cause of death.

On 2 March 1458 the estates of Bohemia unanimously chose George as king. Even the adherents of the papal party voted for him, some in honour of his moderate policies, some out of deference to popular feeling, which opposed the election of a foreign ruler.

George attempted to rule in a moderate manner based on the Compacta of Prague. He won the loyalty of some Catholics, but had to contend with the opposition of Pope Pius II, which proved one of the most serious obstacles to his rule. Pius declared the Compacta null and void in 1462 and wished George to consent to this. George rejected this demand but endeavoured to curry favour with the Papal See by punishing the more extreme Hussites (Taborites) or members of then newly founded Unitas Fratrum church.

=== Message of peace ===
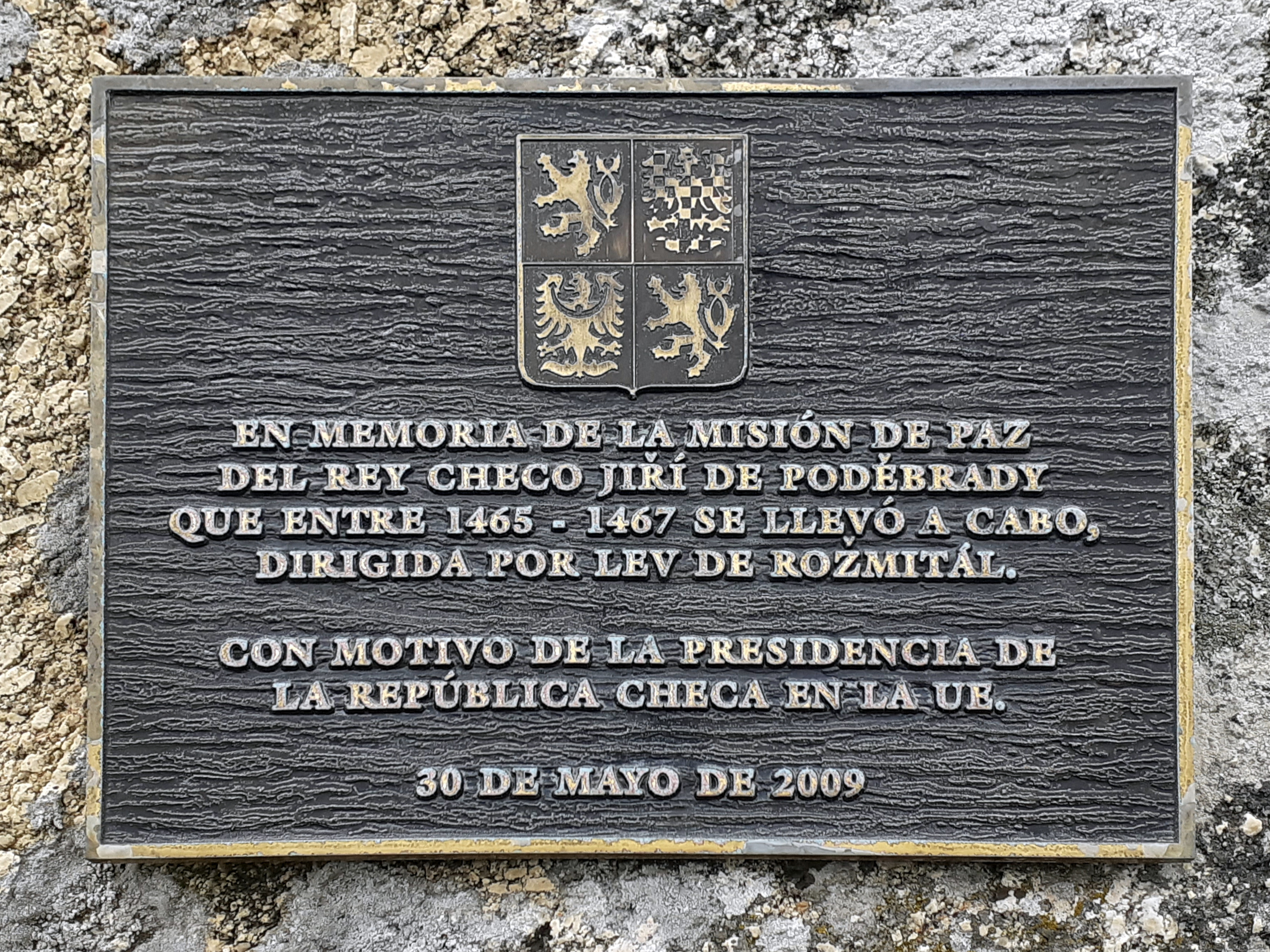
Plaque in Cape Finisterre commemorating the peace mission of George of Podebrady and the travel of Jaroslav Lev of Rožmitál

George attempted to secure peace with Rome by a radical suggestion, which some consider to have been a proposal before its time of a European Union. He proposed a treaty among all Christian powers, with Hungary, Poland, Bohemia, Bavaria, Brandenburg, Saxony, France, Burgundy and Italian states and its princes the founding members, but others, especially the Hispanic powers, joining later. The member states would pledge to settle all differences by exclusively peaceful means. There was to be a common parliament and other common institutions. George couched the proposal in Christian terms ("Europe" is not explicitly mentioned) as a way to stop the "abominable Turk", who had conquered Constantinople in 1453.

He sent his brother-in-law Jaroslav Lev of Rožmitál on a tour of European courts with a draft treaty of the message of peace to promote the idea. George hoped that the treaty would come into effect in 1464. It is seen as one of historical proposals of European unity foreshadowing the European Union.

That did not happen. All George's endeavours to establish peace with Rome proved ineffectual, but Pius II's plan of a crusade against Bohemia remained unexecuted. After Pius' death in 1464, George attempted to negotiate with the new pope, Paul II, who proved to be an equally determined opponent.

=== Struggle with internal opposition and antiking ===
George made enemies among the nobles of the papal party, who assembled at Zelená Hora (Grüneberg) on 28 November 1465 to voice their grievances and conclude an alliance against the king. The alliance was from the outset supported by Paul II, who, on 23 December 1466, excommunicated George and pronounced his deposition as king of Bohemia, which released all subjects of the Bohemian crown from their oaths of allegiance to George. Emperor Frederick III and Hungarian King Matthias Corvinus, George's former ally, joined the insurgent Bohemian nobles, starting the Bohemian War. Matthias conquered a large part of Moravia, and was crowned by the papal party in the Moravian ecclesiastical metropolis Olomouc as king of Bohemia on 3 May 1469.

George was successful against Matthias but, contrary to the wishes of his followers, came to an agreement with the Hungarian king in 1470.

Tomb of George of Poděbrady, King of Bohemia

In the spring of 1471, however, George's health deteriorated significantly and he died on 22 March. He was buried in the royal tomb in St. Vitus Cathedral. His heart and entrails were placed in the Church of Our Lady before Týn in the Old Town, next to the grave of John of Rokycany.

His followers chose Vladislaus II, the son of the Polish king, as his successor to continue the fight against Matthias.

== Legacy ==
The large Jiřího z Poděbrad Square in Prague 3 with the nearby eponymous metro station are named after him. Other squares named after him are in Ostrava, Hořice, Toužim, Řevnice, Kunštát or Nový Knín.

In 1896, an equestrian statue of King George, sculpted by Bohuslav Schnirch was erected in Poděbrady.

During World War I, early in 1917, the 2nd Czechoslovak Rifle Regiment of the Czechoslovak Legions was formed in Russia and named after King George.

== Marriages and children ==
In 1440 he married Kunigunde of Sternberg; they had the following children:

1. Boček (15 July 1442 – 28 September 1496)
2. Victor (29 May 1443 – 30 August 1500), Imperial prince, Duke of Munsterberg and Opava and Count of Kladsko. Married to 1. Margaret Ptáček; 2. Sophie of Silesian Piasts; 3. Helen Margaret Palaiologina, daughter of John IV, Marquess of Montferrat.
3. Barbara (1446–1469), married firstly to Henry of Lipá, and secondly to John of Ronov
4. Henry the Elder (1448–1498), married Ursula of Brandenburg, daughter of Albert III, Margrave of Brandenburg
5. Katharina (11 November 1449 – 8 March 1464), twin of Sidonie, married Matthias Corvinus of Hungary, however died young
6. Sidonie (11 November 1449 – 1 February 1510), twin of Katharina, called Zdeňka, married Albert III, Duke of Saxony

After Kunigunde died in 1449, he married Johanna of Rožmitál in 1450, they had the following children:

1. Henry the Younger (18 May 1452 – 1 July 1492) married Catherine, daughter of William III, Duke of Saxony
2. Frederick (1453–1458)
3. Agnes?, believed to have married in Wallachia
4. Ludmila (16 October 1456 – 20 January 1503), married Frederick I of Liegnitz

== See also ==
- Gregory of Heimburg

George of Poděbrady House of Poděbrady Cadet branch of the Lords of Kunštát Born: 23 April 1420 Died: 22 March 1471
Regnal titles
Preceded by Ladislaus the Posthumous	King of Bohemia; 1458–1471	Succeeded by Vladislaus II & Matthias Corvinus
