= Jan Trampota =

Czech natural painter (1889–1942)

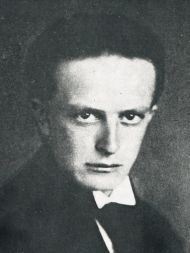
Jan Trampota (date unknown)

Jan Trampota (21 May 1889, Prague – 19 October 1942, Poděbrady) was a Czech Modernist landscape painter.

== Biography ==
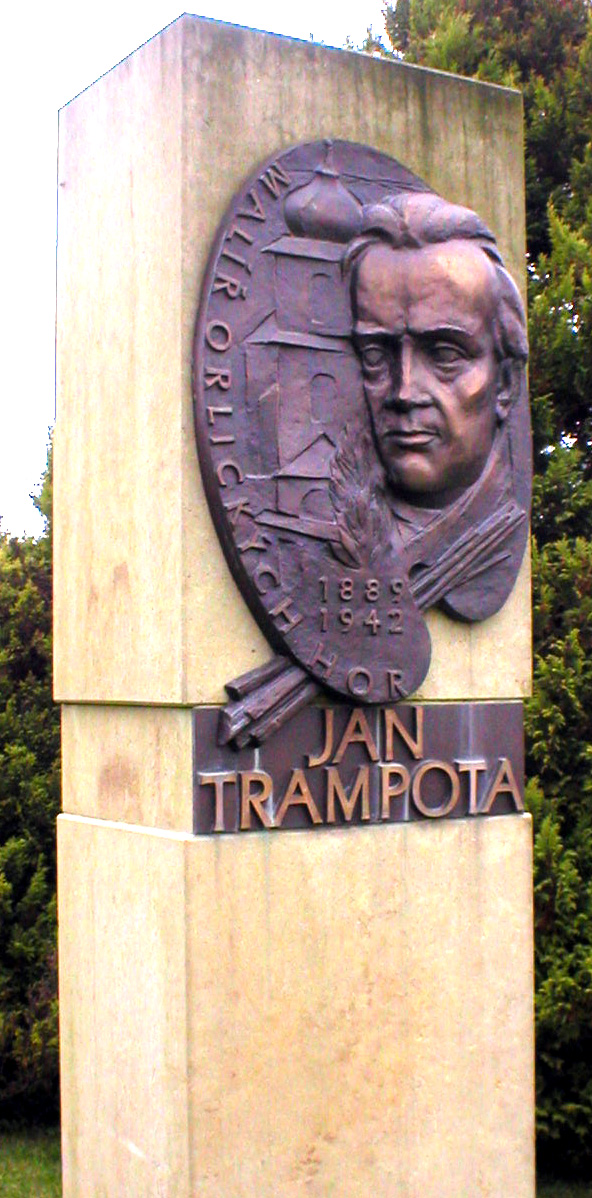
Monument in Pěčín

His father was a shoemaker. He originally intended to be a gardener, but decided to pursue landscape painting instead. From 1907 to 1909, he studied at the Academy of Arts, Architecture and Design and at the Academy of Fine Arts with Jan Preisler, among others. In 1910, his family emigrated to America for economic reasons, but he remained behind.

In 1913, he became a member of the Mánes Union of Fine Arts. Two years later, he went to Nová Ves u Chotěboře at the invitation of Jarmila Šťastná-Mixová (sister of the poet Tereza Dubrovská) where he and several other young Czech artists spent the time painting en plein aire. In 1916, he was drafted into service and was stationed in Salzburg, Bergheim and Fondo. He held his first exhibition upon returning.

From 1919 to 1920, he lived in Nové Hrady and Vysoké Mýto as a guest of the painter Josef Kubíček, and created a series of works on apple farming. He married Albertina Venclová (an amateur actor) in 1921 and, after touring Slovakia and Hungary, settled in Pěčín. From then on, most of his works consisted of landscapes of the local countryside there. His wife died in 1928.

From 1930 to 1931, to help relieve his depression, he visited France with his friend, Rudolf Kremlička, where he visited the art galleries and went on painting expeditions to Normandy. Upon returning, he exhibited the works he created there, but they were not critically well received.

Back in Pěčín, he attempted to synthesize what he had learned by painting seascapes with his earlier landscape style and spent much of his time in the Orlické Mountains. Many of his works from this period were left unfinished.

He had always suffered from a weak heart. In 1939, his health began to fail and he died three years later while seeking a cure at the spa in Poděbrady. A small monument to him has been erected in Pěčín.

== Selected paintings ==
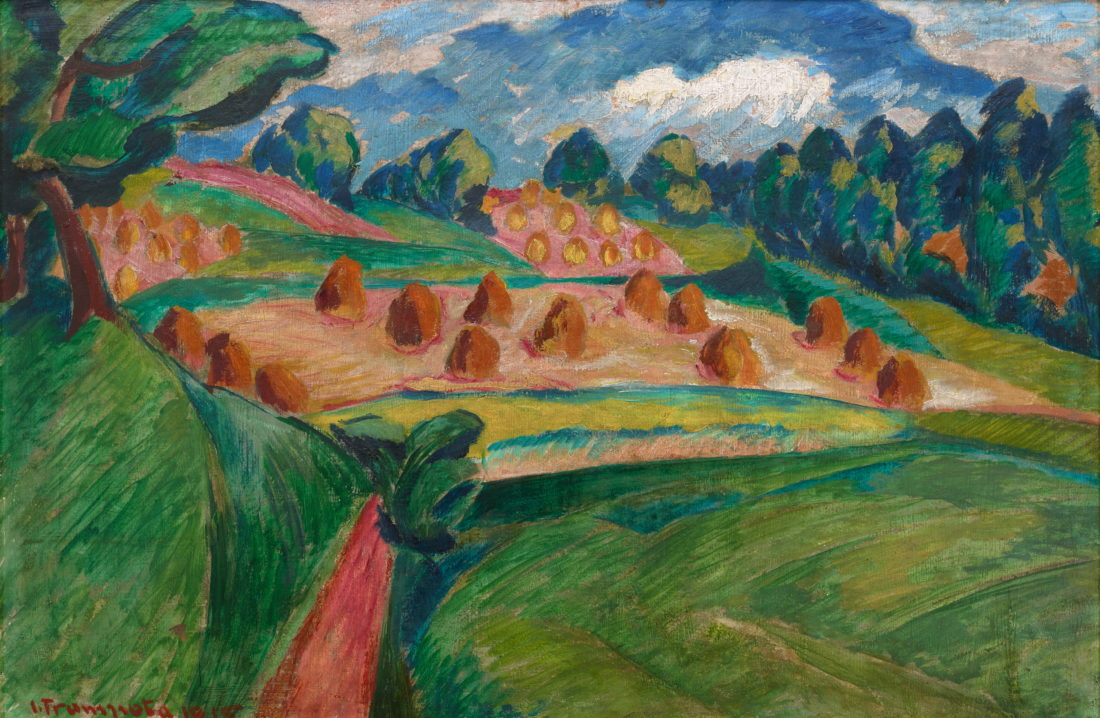
Hillside near Nová Ves

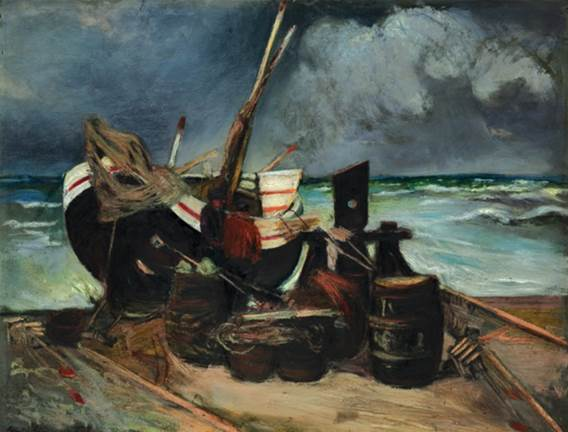
Fishermen in Étretat

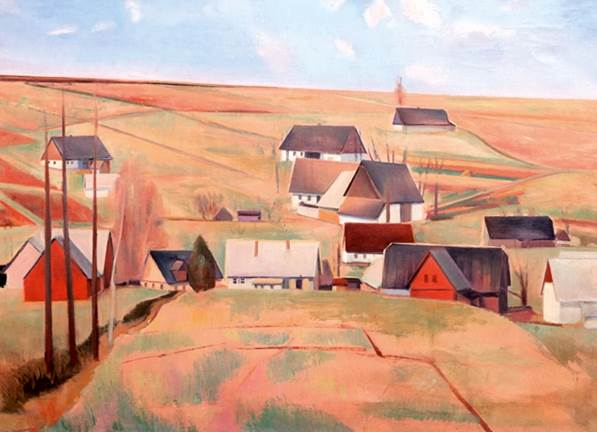
Easter in Pěčín

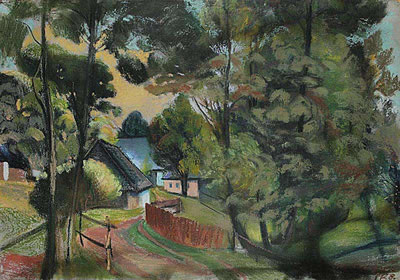
Village in the Orlické Mountains
