= Běrunice =

- Municipality
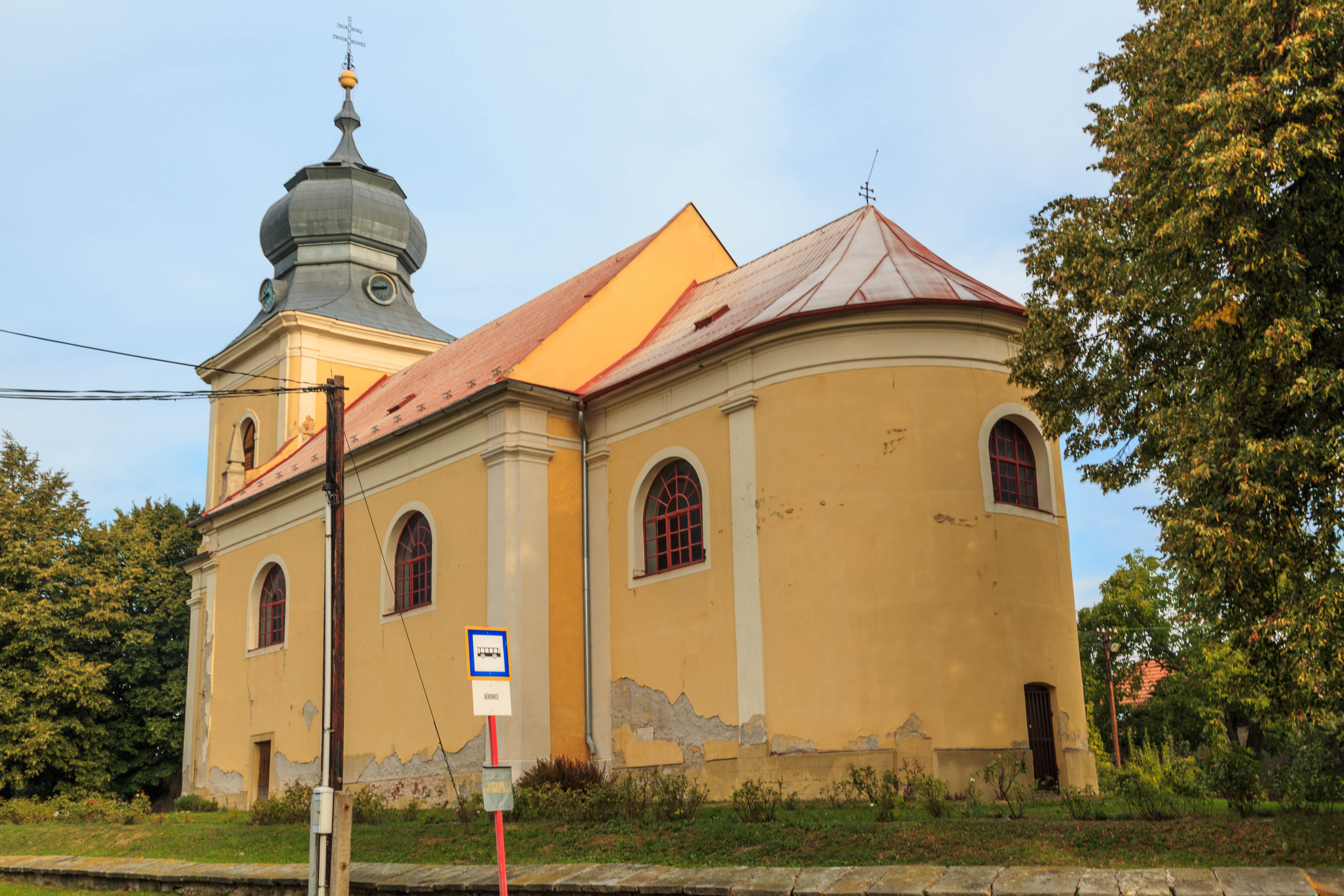
- Church of the Nativity of the Virgin Mary

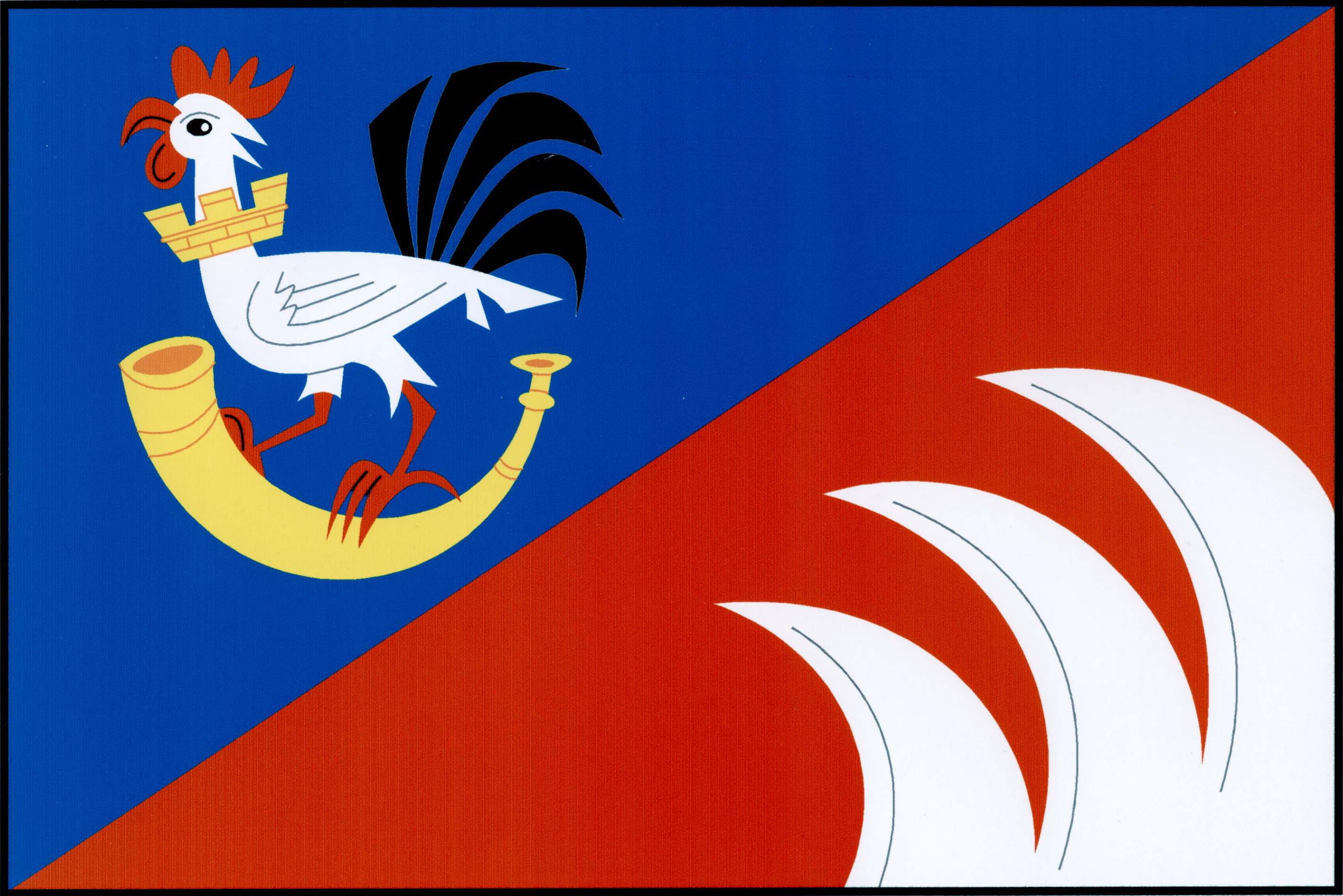
- Flag Coat of arms

- Location in the Czech Republic
- Coordinates: 50°11′9″N 15°20′1″E
- Country: Czech Republic
- Region: Central Bohemian
- District: Nymburk
- First mentioned: 1354

Area
  - Total: 26.64 km^{2} (10.29 sq mi)
- Elevation: 218 m (715 ft)

Population (2026-01-01)
  - Total: 890
  - Density: 33/km^{2} (87/sq mi)
- Time zone: UTC+1 (CET)
  - Summer (DST): UTC+2 (CEST)
- Postal code: 289 08
- Website: www.berunice.cz

Běrunice is a municipality and village in Nymburk District in the Central Bohemian Region of the Czech Republic. It has about 900 inhabitants.

== Administrative division ==
Běrunice consists of five municipal parts (in brackets population according to the 2021 census):

- Běrunice (444)
- Běruničky (64)
- Slibovice (52)
- Velké Výkleky (229)
- Vlkov nad Lesy (61)

== Etymology ==
The name is derived from the personal name Berún, meaning "the village of Berún's people".

== Geography ==
Běrunice is located about 20 kilometres (12 mi) east of Nymburk and 56 km (35 mi) east of Prague. Most of the municipal territory lies in a flat agricultural landscape in the Central Elbe Table. However, the northeastern part extends into the East Elbe Table and includes the highest point of Běrunice at 272 m (892 ft) above sea level. The stream Štítarský potok flows through the municipality.

== History ==
The first written mention of Běrunice is from 1354. The nearby villages of Běruničky and Nový were historically administered by Běrunice, but Nový was attached to Městec Králové in 1950. In 1965, the municipalities of Slibovice, Velké Výkleky, Vlkov nad Lesy and Kněžičky were merged with Běrunice, but Kněžičky became independent again in 1990.

== Demographics ==
Historical population

Year	Pop.	±%
1869	1,814	—
1880	1,871	+3.1%
1890	2,061	+10.2%
1900	2,125	+3.1%
1910	2,090	−1.6%

Year	Pop.	±%
1921	1,911	−8.6%
1930	1,788	−6.4%
1950	1,357	−24.1%
1961	1,365	+0.6%
1970	1,262	−7.5%

Year	Pop.	±%
1980	1,067	−15.5%
1991	909	−14.8%
2001	877	−3.5%
2011	819	−6.6%
2021	850	+3.8%

Source: Censuses

== Transport ==
Běrunice is located on the railway line Městec Králové–Stará Paka.

== Sights ==
The main landmark of Běrunice is the Church of the Nativity of the Virgin Mary. It is a simple Baroque church from 1718, which replaced a demolished medieval church from the 14th century.

== Notable people ==
- František Janda (1886–1956), architect and urban planner
