= CDE Poděbrady =

The Institute for Language and Preparatory Studies at Charles University established the Centre for Distance Education (Czech: Centrum distančního vzdělávání; CDV) in order to prepare distant on-line courses. The Centre is located in Poděbrady at the Poděbrady Castle.

Initially, language courses in the form of blended learning, which is a combination of e-learning and attendance conversational meetings, were chosen. The language courses include courses of Czech language for foreigners and courses of English. English courses available are intended for elementary, pre-intermediate, intermediate, upper-intermediate and FCE students, Czech courses available are intended for A1 and A2 levels (CEFR). A B1 level course is being prepared.

The Institute cooperated on a project called @languages within the framework of the European Union program Leonardo da Vinci. Its aim was to create a course of business English for SMEs.

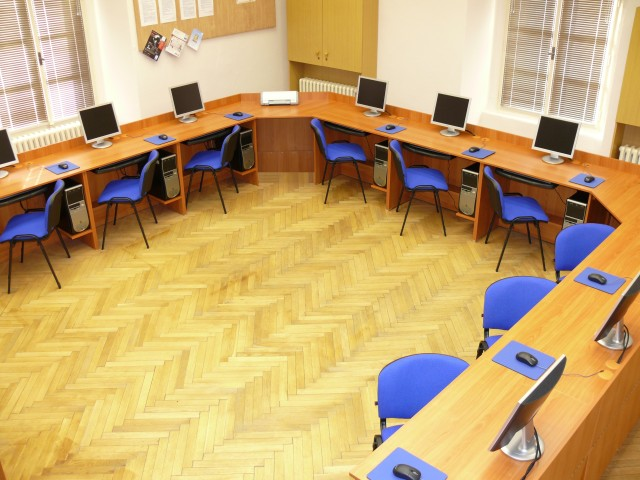
Computer study room

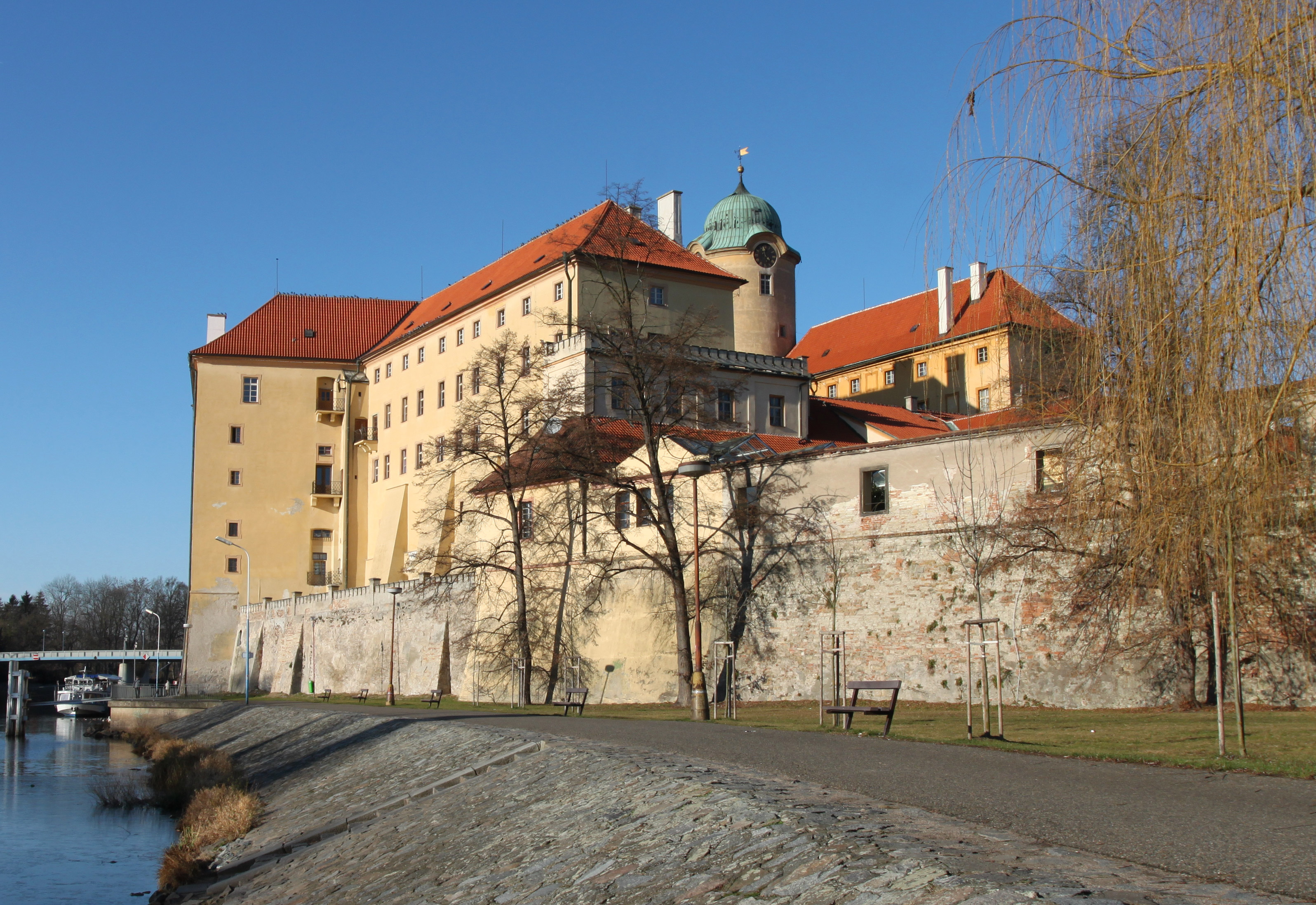
Poděbrady Castle

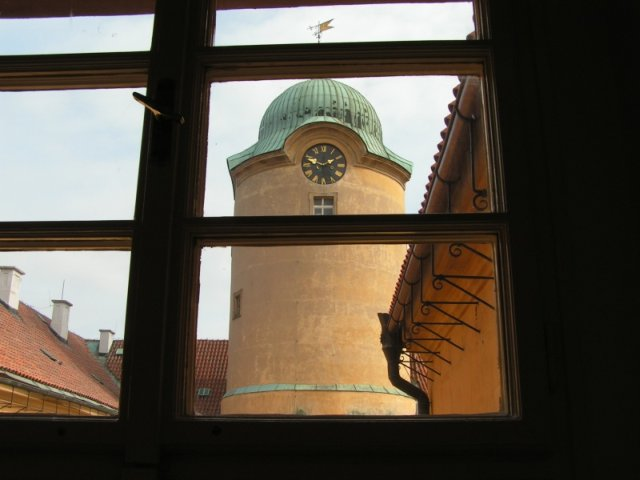
Poděbrady Castle

== See also ==
- Common European Framework of Reference for Languages
- Electronic learning
- Blended learning
