= Poděbrady =

- Town
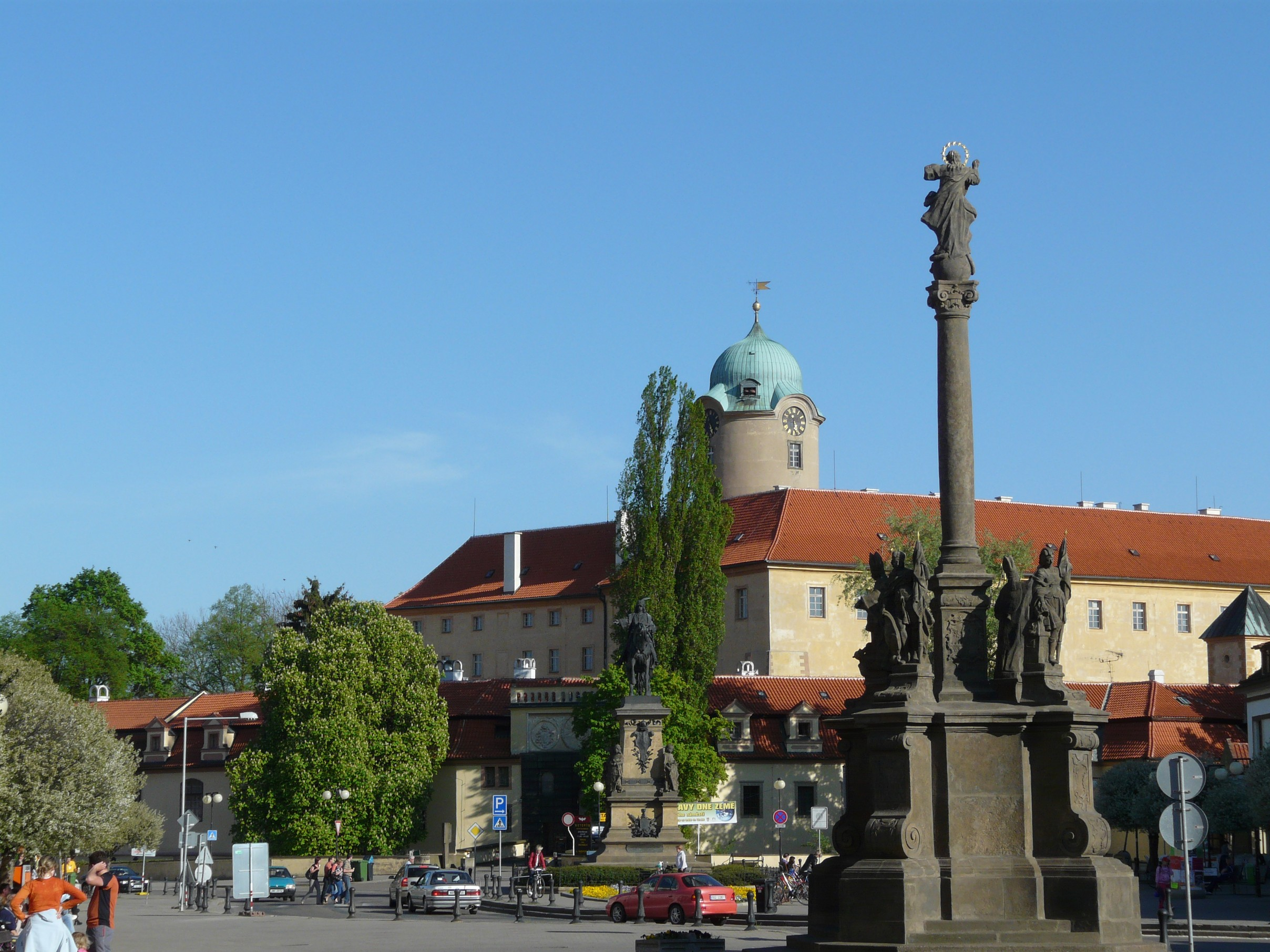
- The square Náměstí Jiřího

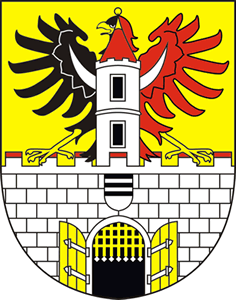
- Flag Coat of arms

- Location in the Czech Republic
- Coordinates: 50°8′33″N 15°7′8″E
- Country: Czech Republic
- Region: Central Bohemian
- District: Nymburk
- First mentioned: 1223

Government
  - Mayor: Roman Schulz (ODS)

Area
  - Total: 33.69 km^{2} (13.01 sq mi)
- Elevation: 185 m (607 ft)

Population (2026-01-01)
  - Total: 15,238
  - Density: 452.3/km^{2} (1,171/sq mi)
- Time zone: UTC+1 (CET)
  - Summer (DST): UTC+2 (CEST)
- Postal code: 290 01
- Website: www.mesto-podebrady.cz

Poděbrady (Czech pronunciation: [ˈpoɟɛbradɪ]; German: Podiebrad) is a spa town in Nymburk District in the Central Bohemian Region of the Czech Republic. It has about 15,000 inhabitants. The town is located on the Elbe River in the Central Elbe Table. It is known for its mineral spring called Poděbradka.

Poděbrady achieved its greatest prosperity during the rule of the Poděbrady family in the 15th century and is known as the probable birthplace of King George of Poděbrady. His descendants promoted Poděbrady to a town in 1472. The historic town centre is well preserved and is protected as an urban monument zone. The main landmark of Poděbrady is the Poděbrady Castle and the most valuable monuments, protected as national cultural monuments, are the Monument of King George and the local hydroelectric power plant.

== Administrative division ==
Poděbrady consists of nine municipal parts (in brackets population according to the 2021 census):

- Poděbrady I (331)
- Poděbrady II (4,254)
- Poděbrady III (6,855)
- Poděbrady IV (50)
- Poděbrady V (768)
- Kluk (639)
- Polabec (442)
- Přední Lhota (347)
- Velké Zboží (850)

== Etymology ==
An ancient community and a small fortress originated near the ford. It is most likely that the position of this community is reflected in the present name of the town: pode brody = 'below the ford'.

== Geography ==
Poděbrady is located about 7 kilometres (4 mi) southeast of Nymburk and 39 km (24 mi) east of Prague. It lies in the Central Elbe Table lowland within the Polabí region. The Elbe River flows through the town.

South of the town is located Poděbrady Lake. It is a 260 ha (640-acre) large lake, created by the flooding of an excavated sandstone quarry. It is mainly used for recreational purposes.

== History ==
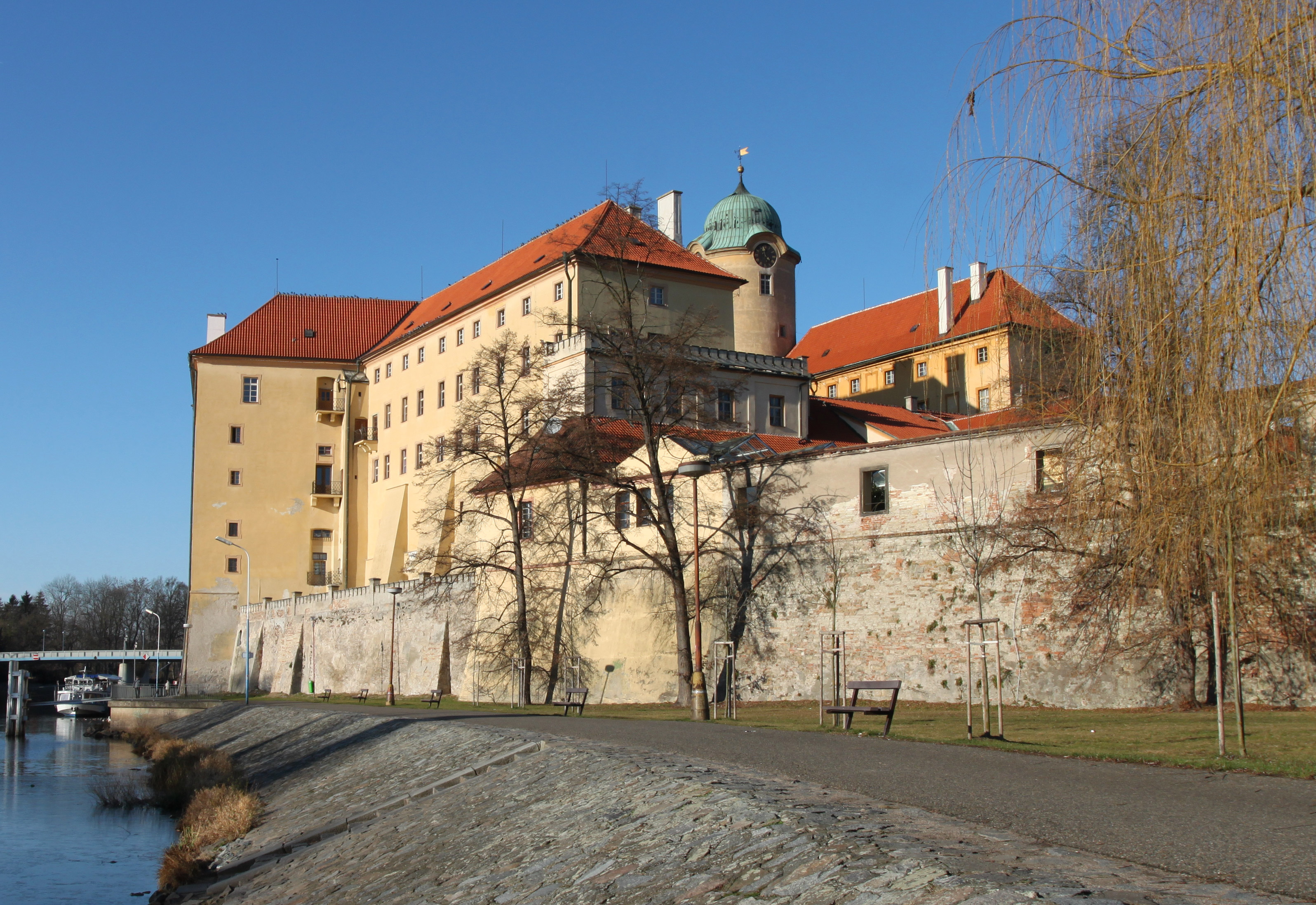
Poděbrady Castle

The first written mention of Poděbrady is from 1223, however, there is also an unverified mention from 1199. A long-distance trade route running from Prague to eastern Bohemia and then on to Silesia and Poland passed through the then-forested landscape interwoven with a dense network of river branches. This important communication intersected the Elbe River to the west of the present town, at a place called Na Vinici. The Poděbrady estate was private, but between 1262 and 1268, it became the property of King Ottokar II as escheat, and he built a stone water castle in Poděbrady. The place has become a popular destination for rulers due to its proximityto Prague and the possibility of hunting in local forests.

Emperor Charles IV handed over the estate to Lords of Kunštát, who later became known as the Poděbrady family. During their presence, Poděbrady achieved its greatest prosperity. In 1472, Poděbrady obtained the town privileges from the descendants of King George of Poděbrady.

During the reign of Ferdinand I, Poděbrady flourished further, however in the 17th century, the town suffered from Thirty Years' War and fires. The biggest fire hit Poděbrady in 1681, when the town hall and most of the wooden houses completely burned down. After this event, only the construction of brick houses was allowed on the square. The town walls were demolished and the town changed its character in a short time.

A historic milestone of the history of the town was the year 1905, when it was visited by the German estate owner Prince von Bülow. This well-known water diviner marked the place of a strong spring in the castle's inner courtyard, which was later bored to a depth of 97.6 metres (320 ft). The discovery of carbonic mineral water resulted in the opening of the first spa in 1908. After World War I Poděbrady rapidly changed into a spa town which from 1926 specialized in the treatment of cardiovascular diseases, rapidly gaining renown not only in the Czech Republic, but also abroad.

== Demographics ==
Historical population

Year	Pop.	±%
1869	4,976	—
1880	5,736	+15.3%
1890	6,096	+6.3%
1900	6,738	+10.5%
1910	7,165	+6.3%

Year	Pop.	±%
1921	7,589	+5.9%
1930	8,967	+18.2%
1950	12,414	+38.4%
1961	13,162	+6.0%
1970	13,353	+1.5%

Year	Pop.	±%
1980	13,782	+3.2%
1991	13,213	−4.1%
2001	13,364	+1.1%
2011	14,133	+5.8%
2021	14,536	+2.9%

Source: Censuses

== Spa ==
The mineral water that was found in the early 1900s is better known as Poděbradka. The water contains iron deposits. There are twelve free public taps where people are able to obtain Poděbradka. The refined version of Poděbradka that is not as heavy is bottled and headed to shops in the whole country.

Lázně Poděbrady, a. s. (Spa Poděbrady, Inc.) is a Czech spa provider in Poděbrady. The spa is focused mainly on the treatment of heart problems and the musculoskeletal system.

== Transport ==
The D11 motorway runs south of the town.

Poděbrady lies on several railway lines: Prague–Kolín, Prague–Trutnov, Kolín–Rumburk and Kolín–Ústí nad Labem.

== Sights ==
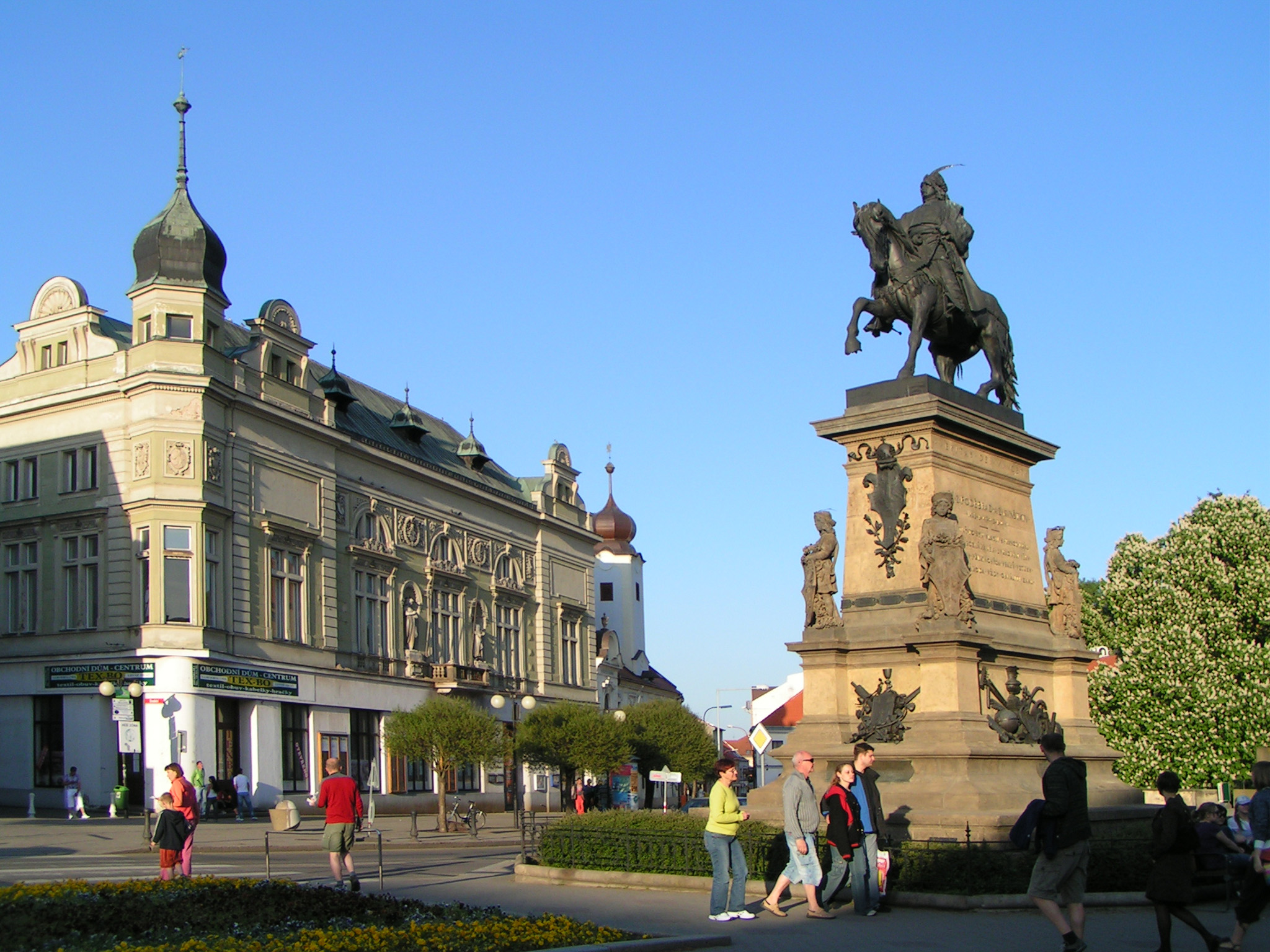
Monument of King George and the Civic Bank building

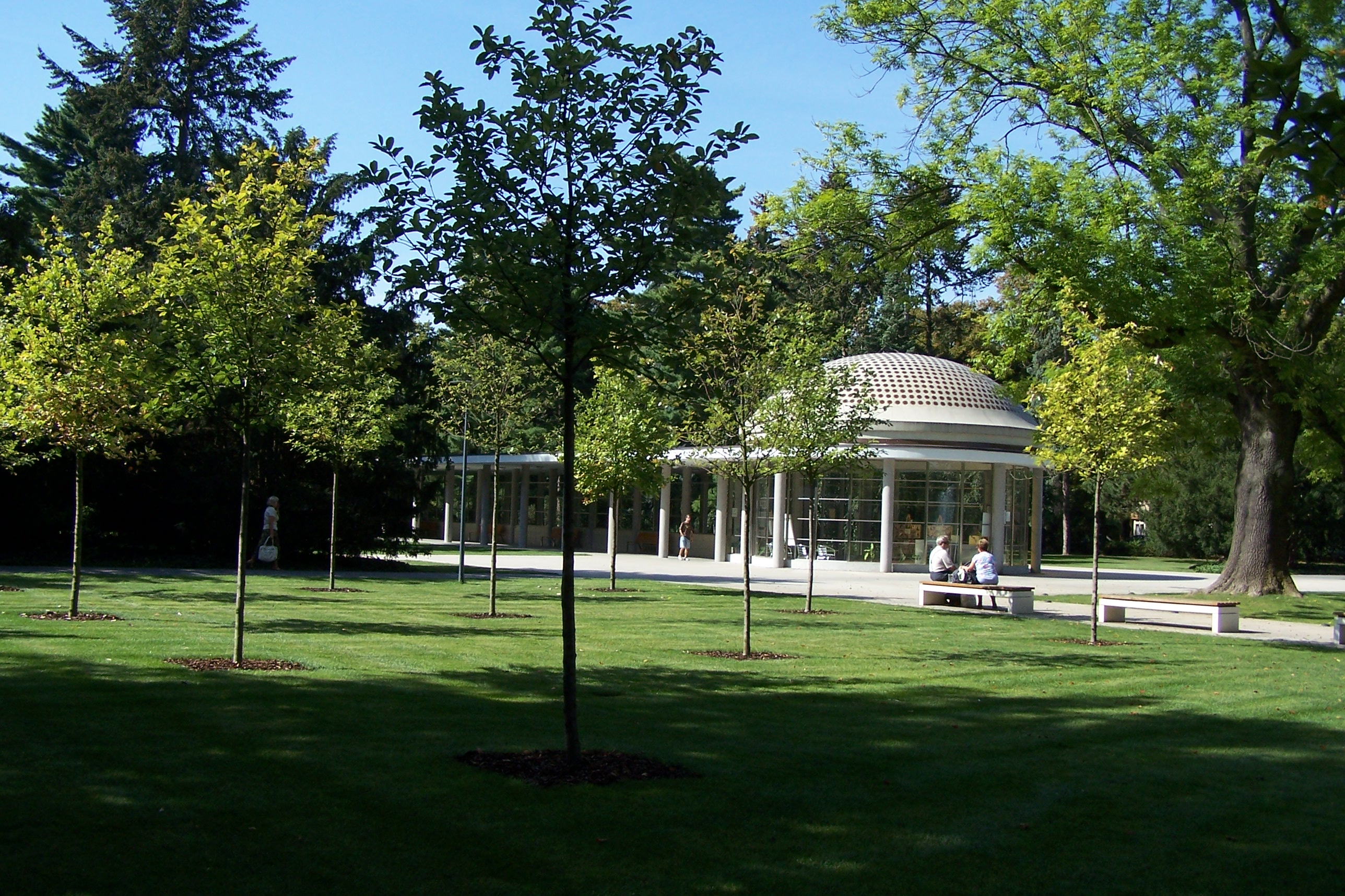
Libenského colonnade

The historic centre is made up of the square Náměstí Jiřího and its surroundings. The main landmark is Poděbrady Castle. It was rebuilt to its current form in 1752–1757 at the behest of Maria Theresa. Today it serves as a museum and monument of George of Poděbrady.

The square is made up of terraced houses of Renaissance and Baroque origin and former Renaissance town hall from the 16th century, nowadays a library. The Neo-Renaissance building of the Civic Bank from 1898 is also valuable. The Baroque Marian column dates from 1765. A significant element of the square is the Monument of King George with his equestrian statue, created in the Neo-Renaissance style in 1890–1896 according to the design by Bohuslav Schnirch. Since 2024, it has been protected as a national cultural monument.

The large spa park with a modern colonnade is also a part of the urban monument zone. The oldest part of the park was created on the site of a former manor park according to the project of architect František Janda. Gradually, more parts were added and the park expanded. The glass colonnade of Professor Libenský was built in 1938. The colonnade was built above a spring of mineral water.

The most notable technical monument is the Poděbrady hydroelectric power plant. It is a Neoclassical building designed by Antonín Engel in 1913 and built in 1914–1919. It is valued for still functional technology and its architectural solution. It is one of the oldest locks in the Middle Elbe and at the same time a valuable example of technological and operational solutions for this type of waterworks. The power plant is protected as a national cultural monument.

== Notable people ==
- George of Poděbrady (1420–1471), King of Bohemia
- Kunigunde of Sternberg (1425–1449), wife of George of Poděbrady; died here
- Ludvík Kuba (1853–1956), painter, musician and writer
- Jan Vladimír Hráský (1857–1939); architect; worked here and is buried here
- Jan Trampota (1889–1942), painter; died here
- Hans Janowitz (1890–1954), Austrian writer
- Franz Janowitz (1892–1917), Austrian poet
- Josef and Ctirad Mašín, resistance fighters; studied here
- Miloš Forman (1932–2018), filmmaker; studied here
- Václav Havel (1936–2011), first president of the Czech Republic; studied here
- Jiří Kodeš (1933–2006), sprint canoer and golf player
- Marta Kubišová (born 1942), singer

== Twin towns – sister cities ==
Poděbrady is twinned with:

- Celldömölk, Hungary
- Netanya, Israel
- Piešťany, Slovakia
- Tharandt, Germany
- Vertou, France
- Wołomin, Poland

== Gallery ==
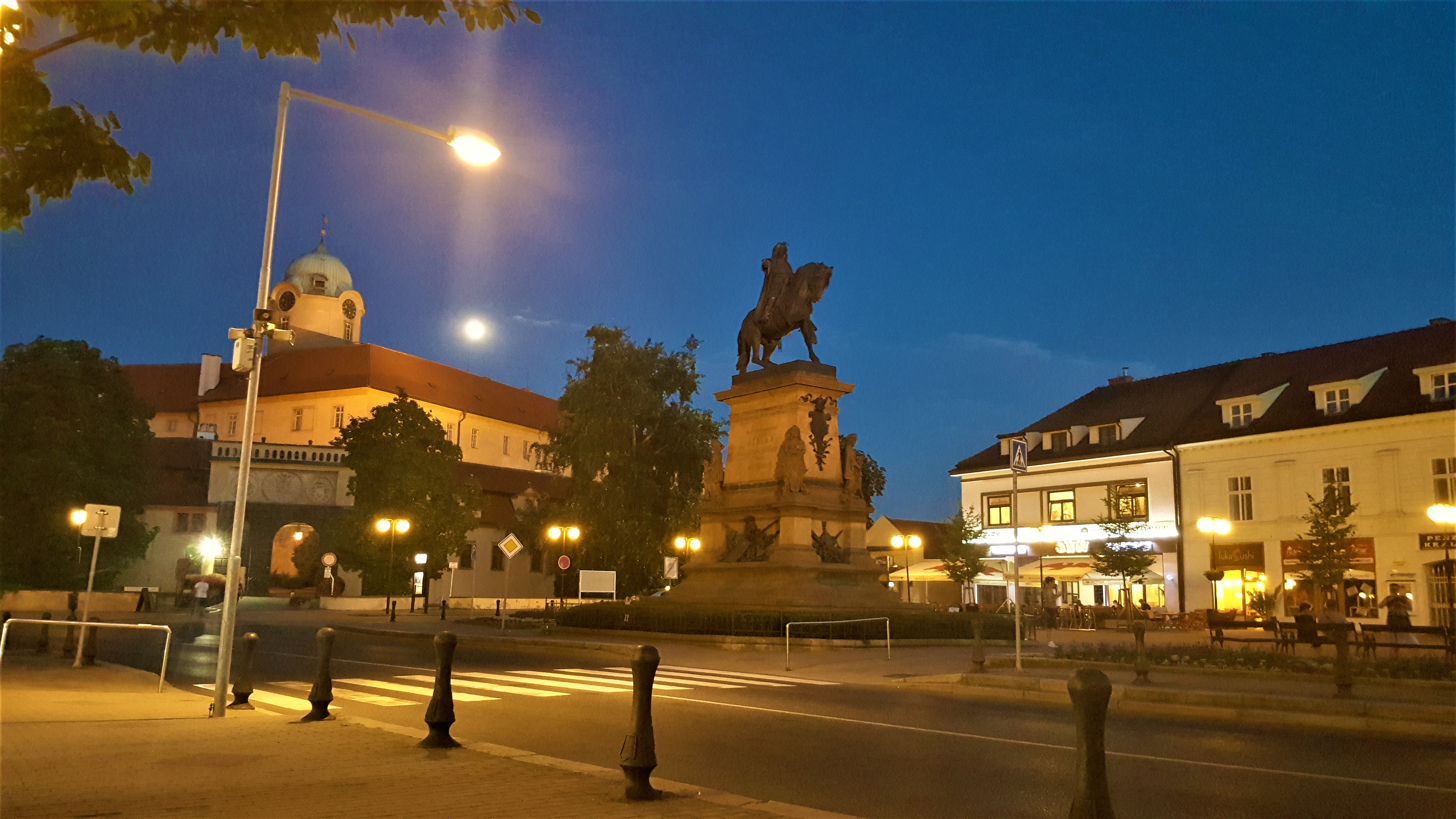
Náměstí Jiřího

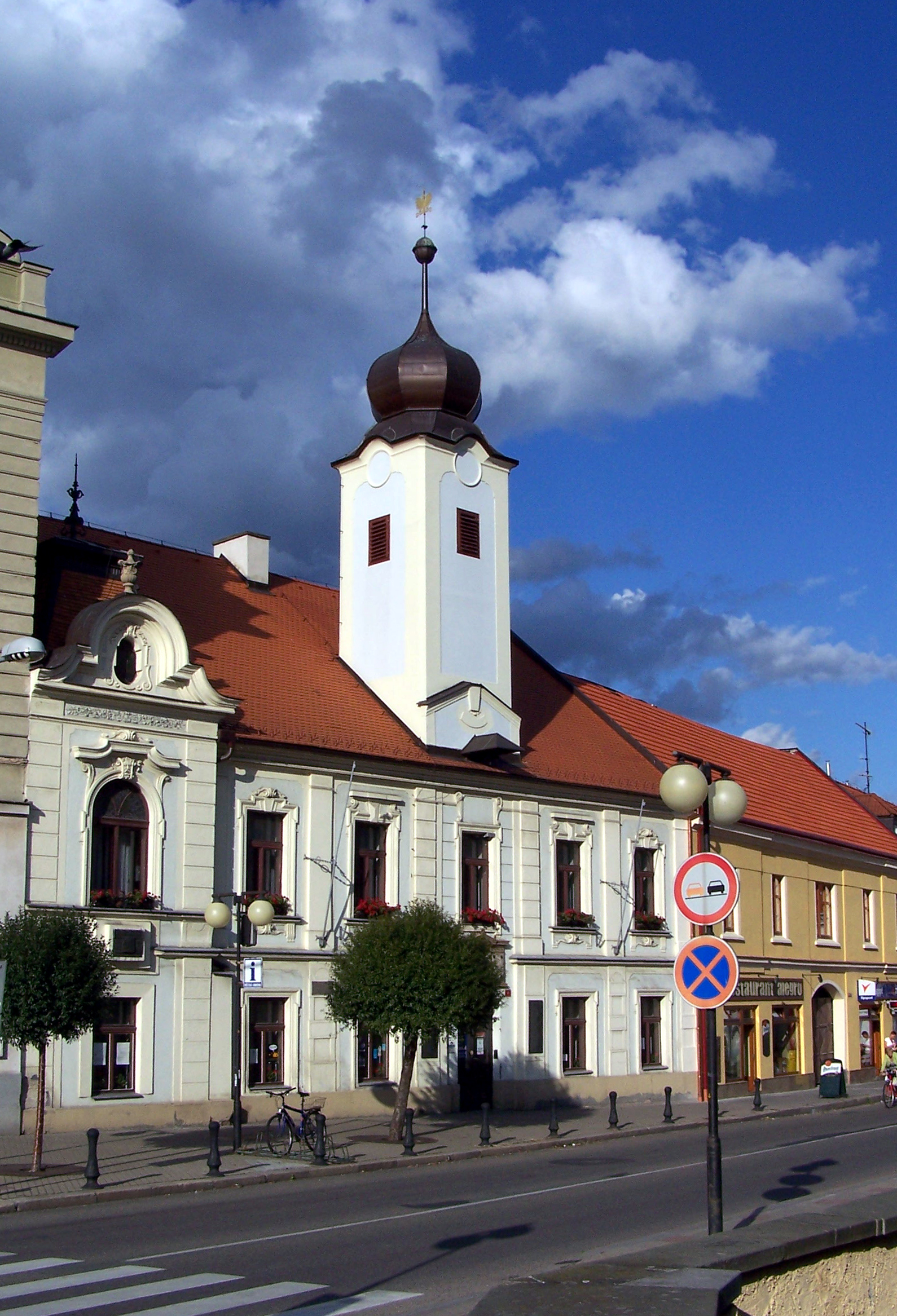
Old town hall

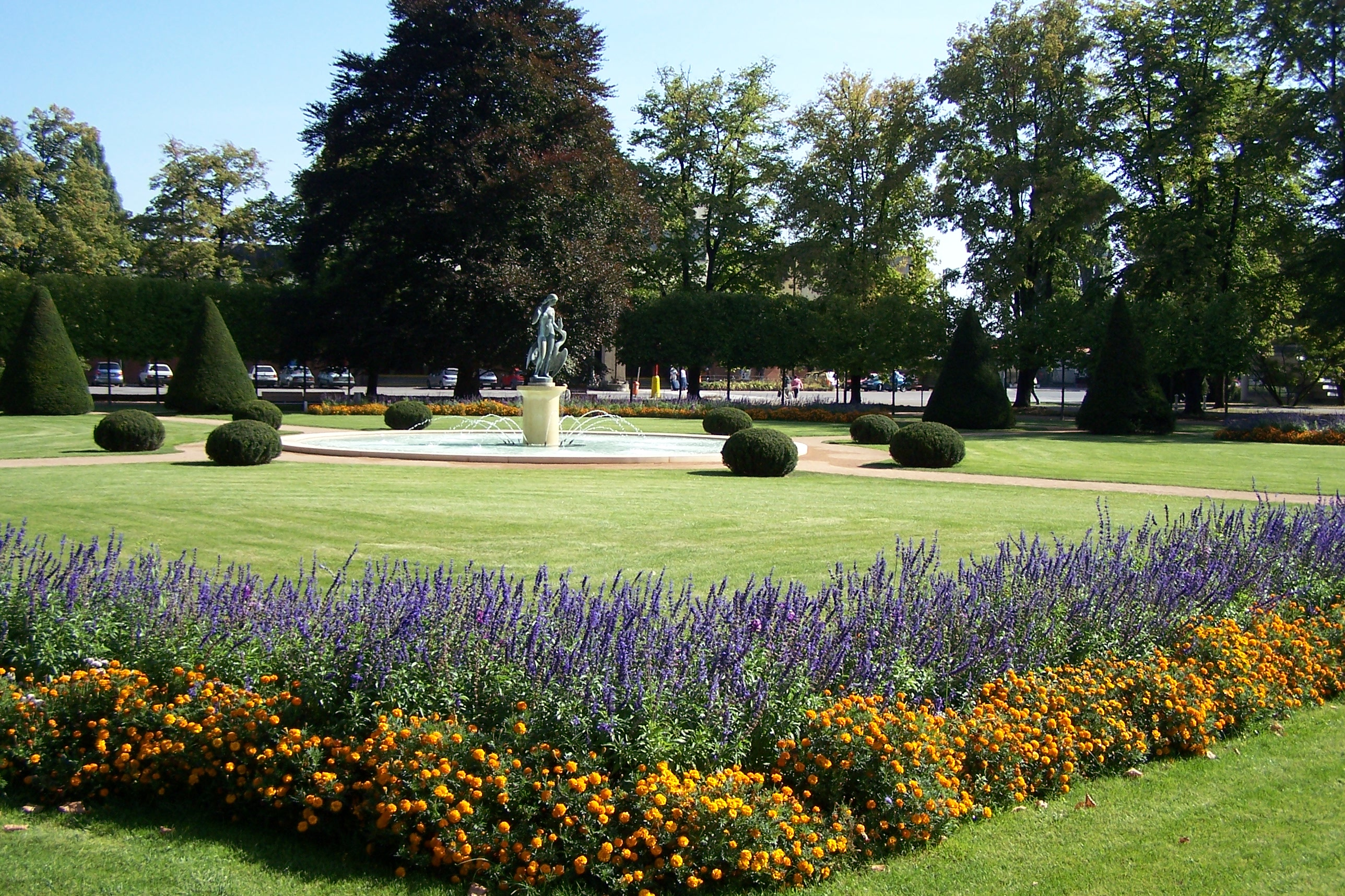
Spa park

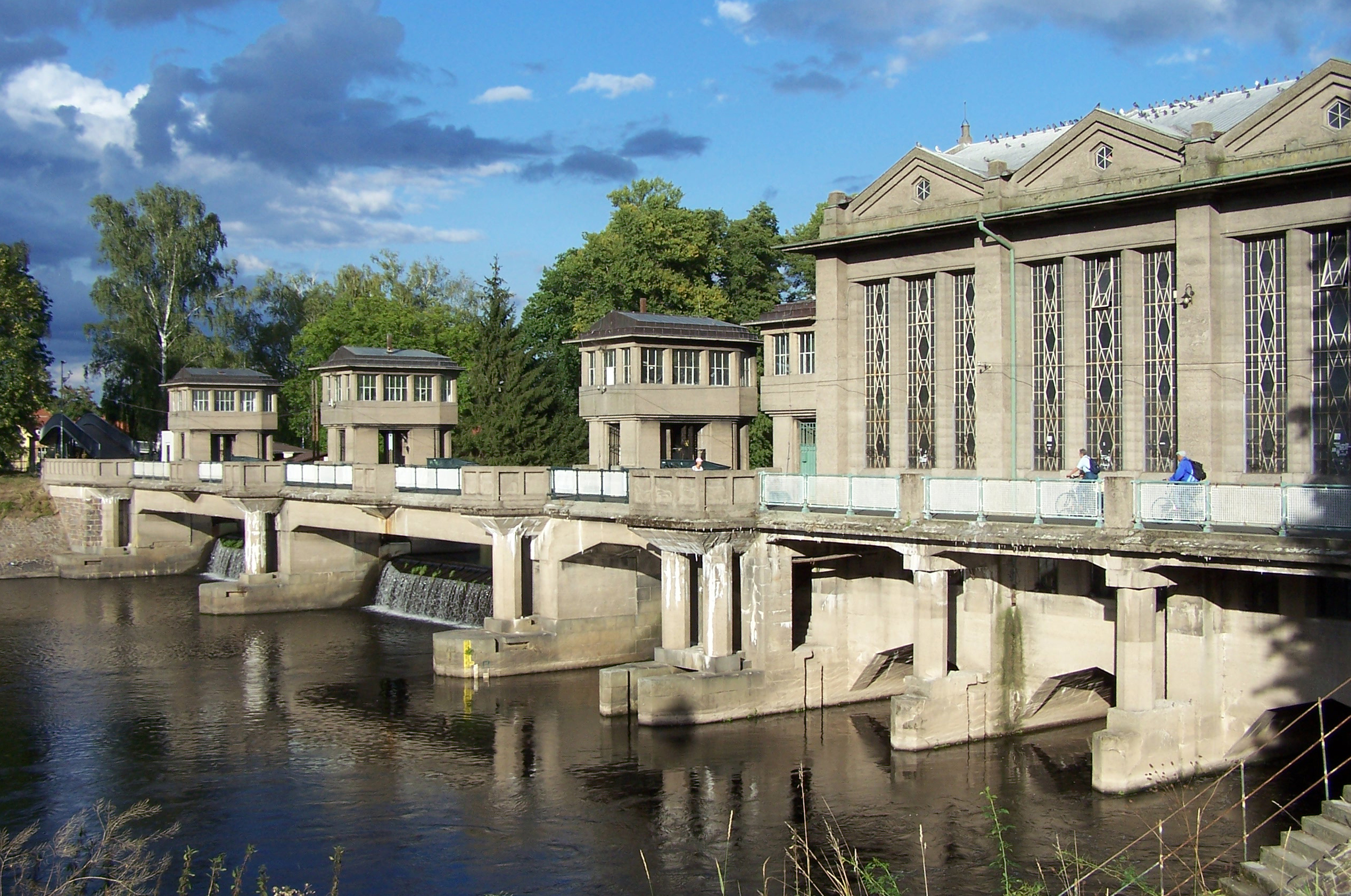
Hydroelectric power plant

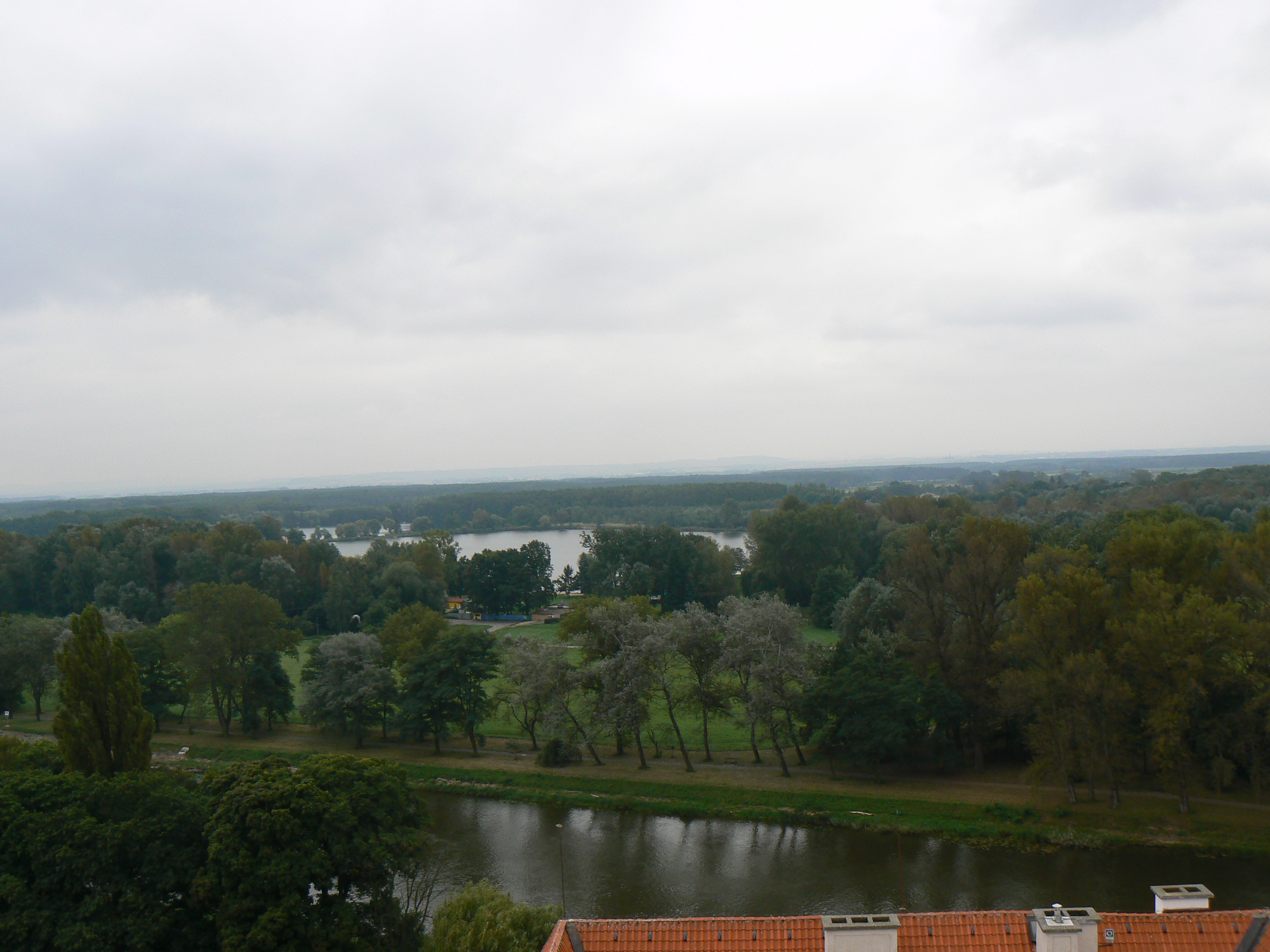
Elbe and Poděbrady Lake

== See also ==
- CDE Poděbrady
