= František Janda =

Czech architect and urban planner (1886–1956)

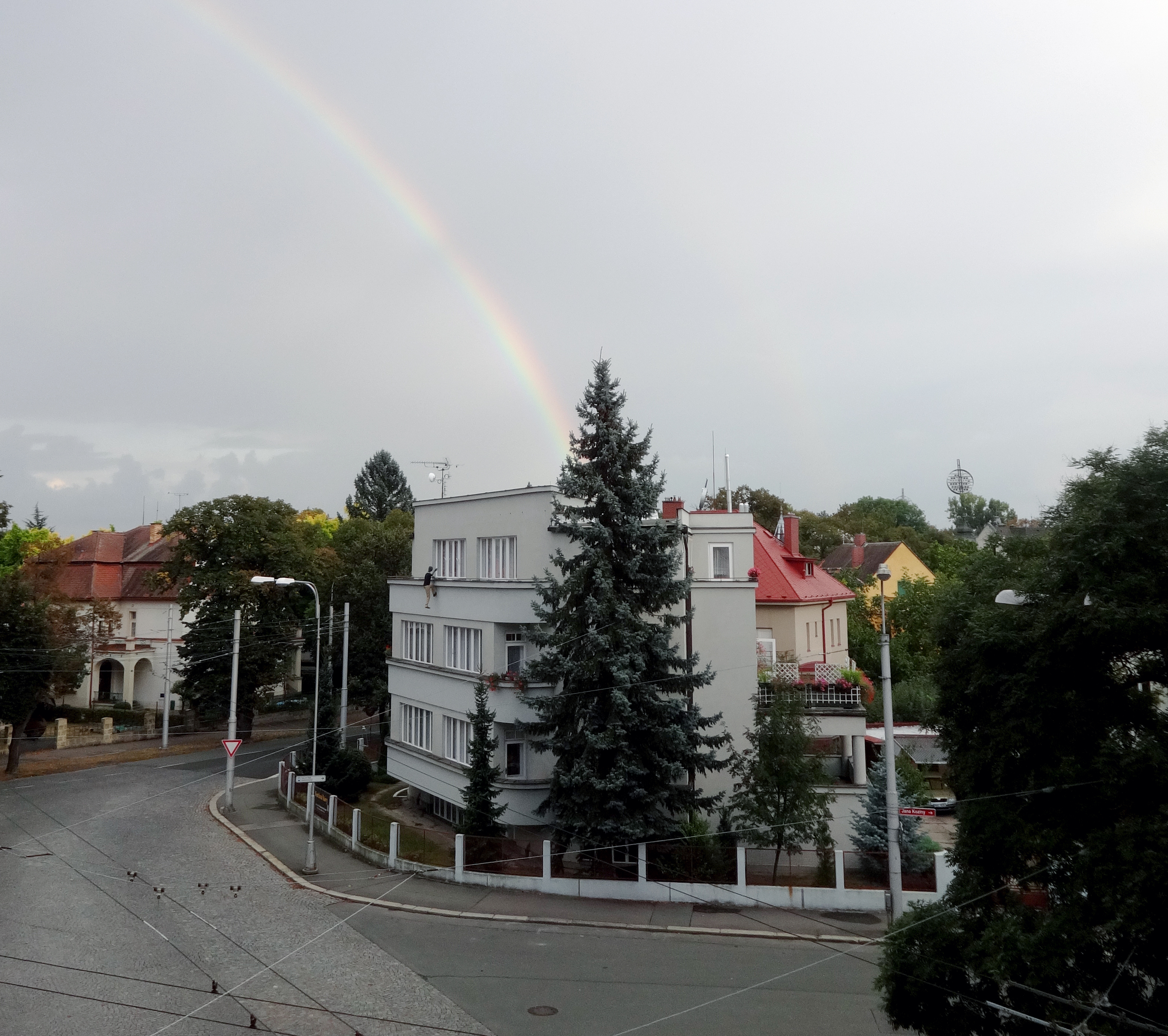
- Waldekova Vila (1937)
- Born: 10 September 1886; Běrunice, Bohemia, Austria-Hungary
- Died: 2 March 1956 (aged 69); Prague, Czechoslovakia
- Education: Academy of Arts, Architecture and Design in Prague
- Occupations: Architect, urban planner

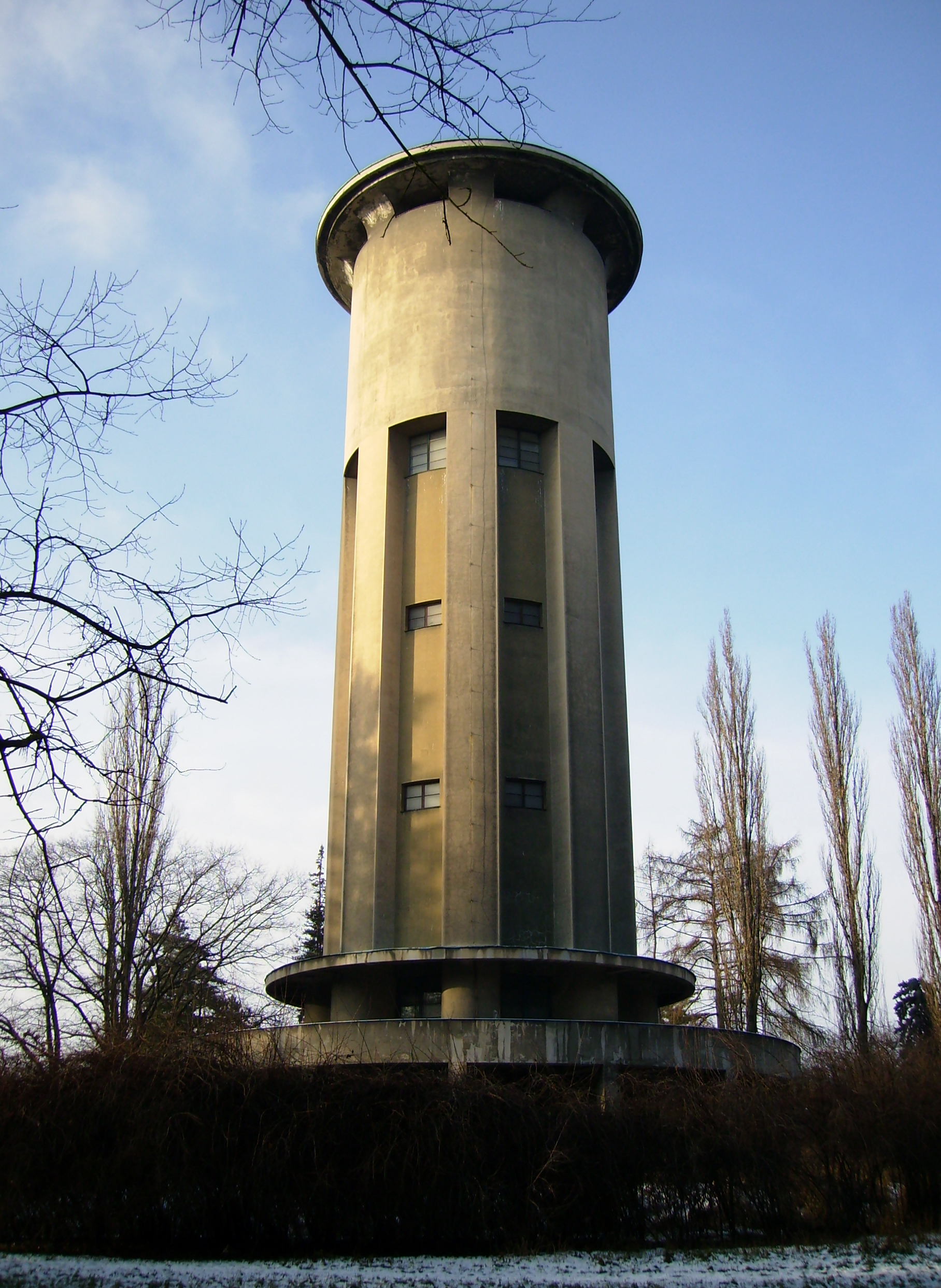
Poděbrady water tower

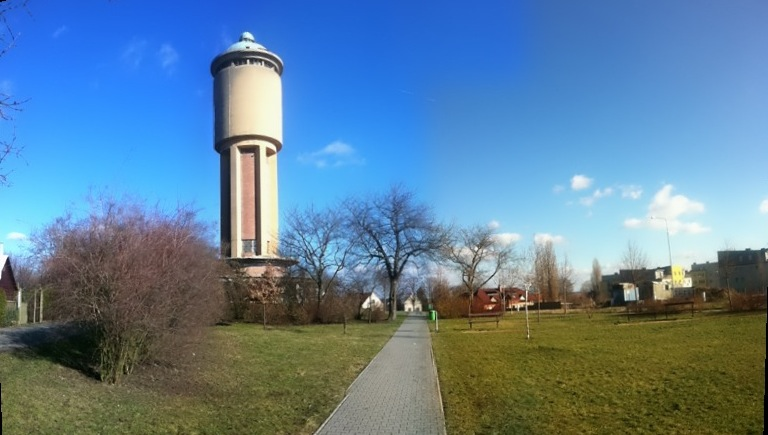
Kolín water tower

František Janda (10 September 1886 – 2 March 1956) was a Czech architect and urban planner, in which capacity he authored many regulation designs. Janda studied under the tutelage of Jan Kotěra at the Academy of Arts, Architecture and Design in Prague. Along with pianist and composer Václav Štěpán he founded the Arts Forum, for which he designed and in 1925 finished construction of his Cooperative Arts Forum building in Prague's Malá Strana district. For the remainder of his life Janda lived in this building. In 1960, four years after his death, the property was confiscated by the communist government. Janda's wife, however, was allowed to continue living there until her death. His most famous building is probably the functionalist Waldekova Vila in Hradec Králové (1937).

== Works ==
- Winter spa in Poděbrady (1912)
- 30-room art nouveau guest house at Rieger's Square, Poděbrady spa (1912)
- Regulation plans for the cities of Mladá Boleslav and Poděbrady (1912) and the spa village Brestovičky
- Mladá Boleslav courthouse
- Building societies in Mnichovo Hradiště, Holice, Bakov nad Jizerou, Nová Paka and Mnichovo Hradiště
- Arts Forum in Prague (1925)
- (with Č. Vořech) Theatre Na Prádle, Prague-Malá Strana (1924–26)
- District Union building in Nové Strašecí (1928–1930)
- Water towers in Kolín (1930; Janda replaced Jan Vladimír Hráský, author of the original 1928 project), Podebrady, Jaroměř, Bělá pod Bezdězem and Pečky
- Merkur restaurant and cafe in Jablonec nad Nisou (1930)
- Office buildings, including erstwhile municipal HQ, in Sušice (1925–1932)
- Waldekova Vila in Hradec Králové (1937)
