= Franz Janowitz =

Austrian poet and soldier (1892–1917)

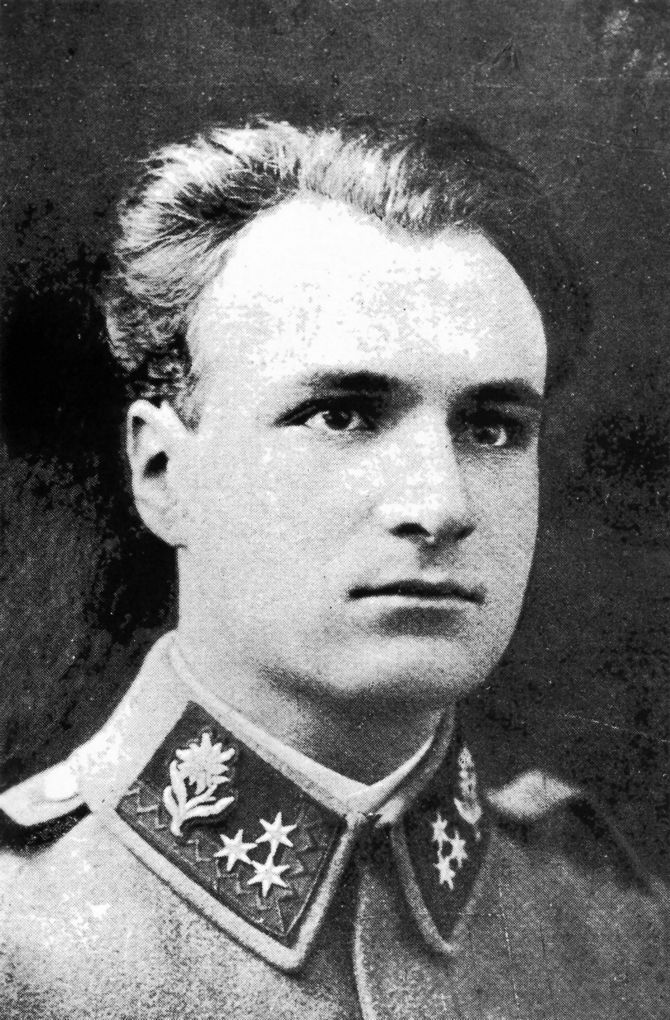
Franz Janowitz in 1914

Franz Janowitz (28 July 1892 – 4 November 1917) was an Austrian-Jewish poet, who wrote in German.

== Life and work ==
Franz Janowitz was born on 28 July 1892 in Poděbrady, Bohemia, Austria-Hungary (now the Czech Republic). He was the younger son of the German-Jewish factory owner Gustav Janowitz (1849–1923) and his wife Hermine (née Schick) (1866–1924). He had two older brothers, including the writer and screenwriter Hans Janowitz (1890–1954).

In 1903, his parents sent him to Prague, where he attended the Imperial and Royal State Gymnasium in Prague-New Town. In Prague, he met Franz Werfel, Willy Haas, Max Brod, and other German-Jewish writers. He soon became involved in organizing Prague's cultural life. Together with Willy Haas, they invited the famous Viennese satirist Karl Kraus, which caused a great stir. In Prague, Karl Kraus made friends with young writers, including Franz Janowitz. This friendship deepened over the years into a special affection that shaped his future life.

After passing his school leaving examination in 1911, Janowitz, at his father's urgent request, began studying chemistry in Leipzig, which he completed in 1912. From then on, he wanted to devote himself exclusively to philosophical studies and literary work. In the winter semester of 1912, he enrolled in the Faculty of Philosophy at the University of Vienna. His doctoral thesis was to be devoted to the philosophy of Otto Weininger. His first poems appeared in Herder-Blätter, and he was recognized as a promising talent. Max Brod selected 16 of his poems for his yearbook Arkadia, published by Kurt Wolff Verlag. Janowitz was enrolled in Vienna for only three semesters. His one-year volunteer service interrupted his studies, and the war forced an end to his studies altogether.

Janowitz had enlisted in the Austro-Hungarian Army in 1913. After Austria-Hungary declared war on Serbia on 28 July 1914, Janowitz was mobilized in Bolzano and sent to the Galician front. Suffering from severe dysentery, his war service was initially deferred, but he later drafted into company duty in the hinterland and was stationed in Enns. Most of his war poems were written in Enns. However, after being declared fit for military service again, he was forced to return to the front in Enns. During an assault on Monte Rombon, in the Battle of Caporetto, he suffered a severe chest wound and died of his injuries on 4 November 1917, in Field Hospital 1301. He was buried in the military cemetery in Mittel-Breth (now Log pod Mangartom in Slovenia).

Two years after Janowitz's death, Karl Kraus published in Munich a slim volume of his poetry from his estate, entitled Aus der Erde und anderen Dichtungen ("Out of the Earth and Other Poems"), with Kurt Wolff Verlag. The volume represents the brief selection that the poet himself was preparing for publication.

The first complete collection of his poems, however, came out only in 1992. According to the British scholar and poet Jeremy Adler, "Franz Janowitz conflicts with the received idea of the best German war poets. Neither realistic, nor ironic, nor properly expressionistic, while he excoriated the battlefield that the whole world had become, he still preserved a Faith in nobility, innocence, and song. Forced into maturity by the war, his poetic voice never lost a certain childlike note – indeed, in some of his best poems, naivety and wisdom coexist to an almost paradoxical degree. Such poetry was fired by a vision of a transcendental realm that lay beyond conflict, but never sought to exclude death. His 25 years, the last four of which were spent in the Army, scarcely left him time to develop a wholly independent voice, but his work displays an increasing mastery of form and deepening of vision. His small oeuvre consists of Novellen, essays, aphorisms, and a handful of the best German poems connected with the Great War."

== Works ==
- Auf der Erde und andere Dichtungen (On Earth and Other Poems), Works, Letters, and Documents (with an appendix edited by Dieter Sudhoff. Innsbruck Haymon-Verlag, 1992 (Brenner Studies; Vol. 12)
- Die Fackel. Nos. 474-483 / xx (May 23, 1918), pp. 69–71
- Judaica Bohemiae IV, Statni Zidovske Muzeum Prague 1968
- Die literarische Welt – Erinnerungen. Willy Haas, Paul List Verlag, Munich 1980, p. 257
- Bo Osdrowski/Tom Riebe (eds.): Versensporn – Heft für lyrische Reize. No. 17: Franz Janowitz, Poesie Schmeckt Gut e.V., 2014
- Prague German Stories, Philipp Reclam Jr., Stuttgart 1992, ISBN 3-15-008771-6, pp. 466–477.
