= Pěčín =

- Municipality
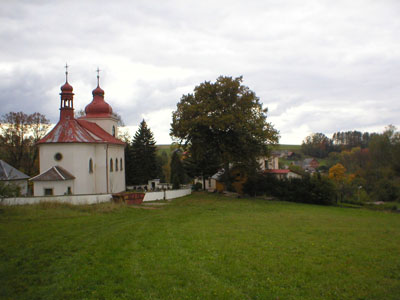
- Church of Saint John the Baptist

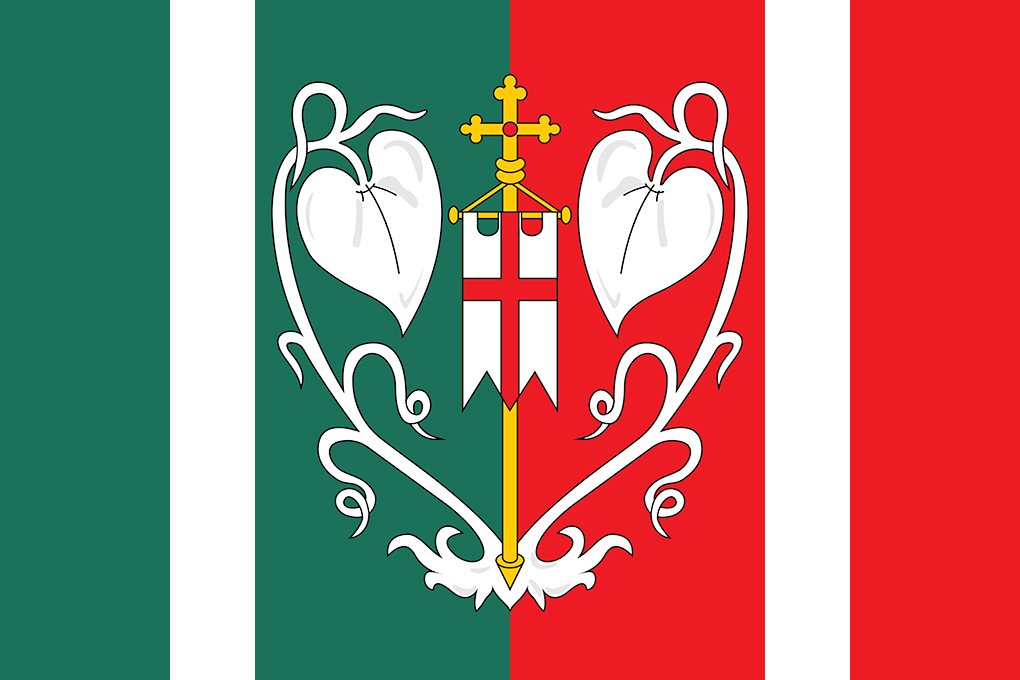
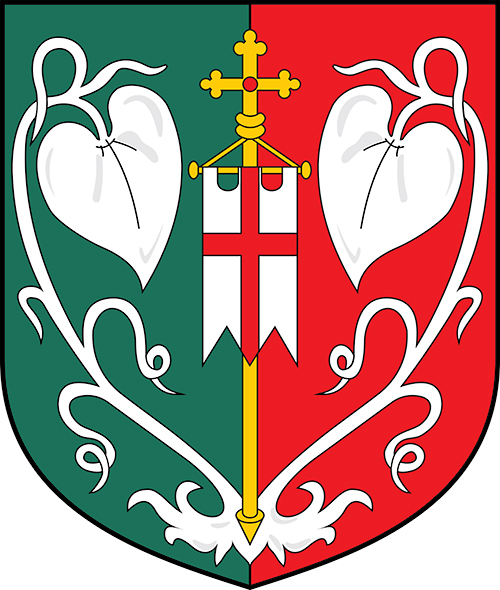
- Flag Coat of arms

- Location in the Czech Republic
- Coordinates: 50°9′14″N 16°25′29″E
- Country: Czech Republic
- Region: Hradec Králové
- District: Rychnov nad Kněžnou
- First mentioned: 1237

Area
  - Total: 14.79 km^{2} (5.71 sq mi)
- Elevation: 507 m (1,663 ft)

Population (2026-01-01)
  - Total: 473
  - Density: 32.0/km^{2} (82.8/sq mi)
- Time zone: UTC+1 (CET)
  - Summer (DST): UTC+2 (CEST)
- Postal code: 517 57
- Website: www.pecin.cz

Pěčín is a municipality and village in Rychnov nad Kněžnou District in the Hradec Králové Region of the Czech Republic. It has about 500 inhabitants.

== Demographics ==
Historical population
Year	Pop.	±%
1869	1,193	—
1880	1,177	−1.3%
1890	1,240	+5.4%
1900	1,152	−7.1%
1910	1,108	−3.8%
1921	1,050	−5.2%
1930	891	−15.1%
1950	683	−23.3%
1961	649	−5.0%
1970	563	−13.3%
1980	530	−5.9%
1991	479	−9.6%
2001	490	+2.3%
2011	508	+3.7%
2021	447	−12.0%
Source: Censuses
