= Kněžičky =

- Municipality
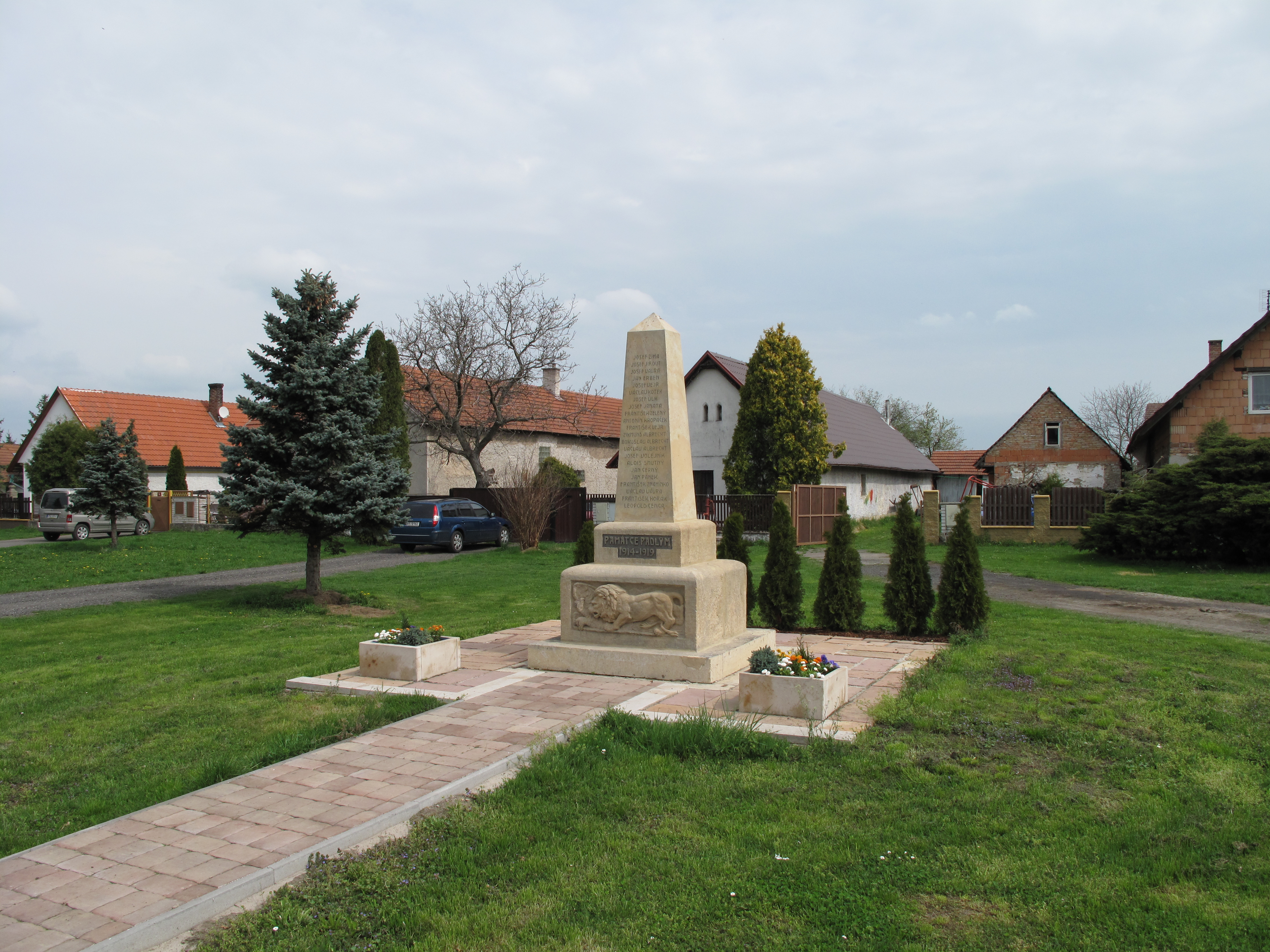
- Memorial to the Fallen in World War I

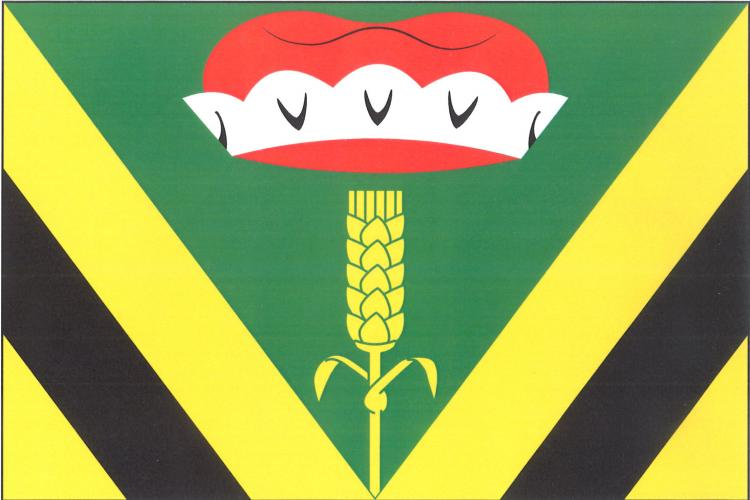
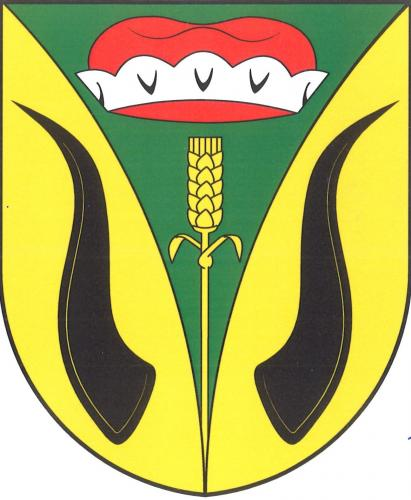
- Flag Coat of arms

- Location in the Czech Republic
- Coordinates: 50°10′26″N 15°20′42″E
- Country: Czech Republic
- Region: Central Bohemian
- District: Nymburk
- First mentioned: 1390

Area
  - Total: 11.88 km^{2} (4.59 sq mi)
- Elevation: 227 m (745 ft)

Population (2026-01-01)
  - Total: 197
  - Density: 16.6/km^{2} (42.9/sq mi)
- Time zone: UTC+1 (CET)
  - Summer (DST): UTC+2 (CEST)
- Postal code: 289 08
- Website: www.knezicky.cz

Kněžičky is a municipality and village in Nymburk District in the Central Bohemian Region of the Czech Republic. It has about 200 inhabitants.

== Demographics ==
Historical population
Year	Pop.	±%
1869	410	—
1880	381	−7.1%
1890	401	+5.2%
1900	437	+9.0%
1910	512	+17.2%
1921	456	−10.9%
1930	418	−8.3%
1950	356	−14.8%
1961	306	−14.0%
1970	294	−3.9%
1980	235	−20.1%
1991	204	−13.2%
2001	183	−10.3%
2011	188	+2.7%
2021	170	−9.6%
Source: Censuses
