= Poděbrady Castle =

Castle in central Czech Republic

Coordinates: 50°08′29.7″N 15°07′09.6″E

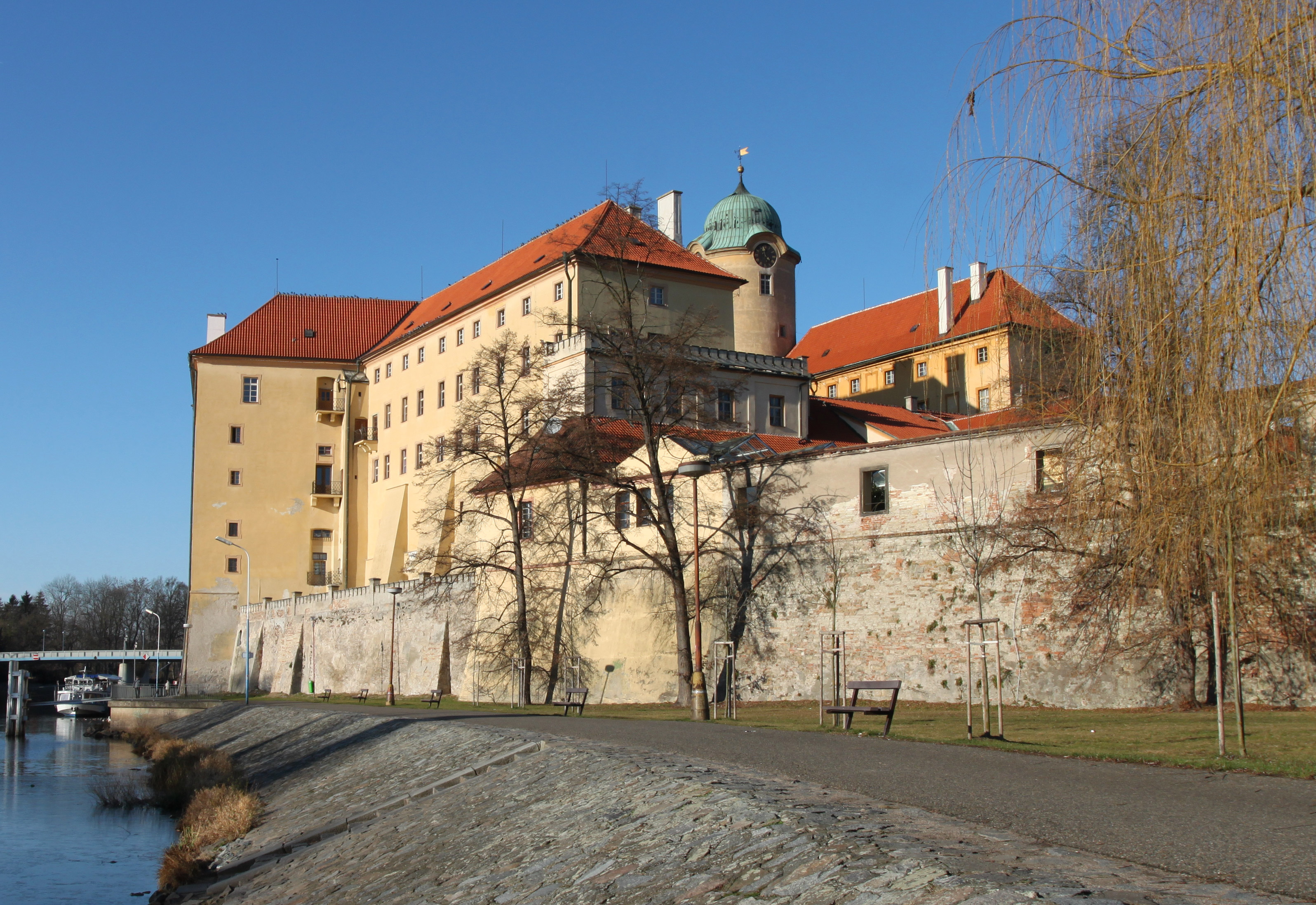
Poděbrady Castle

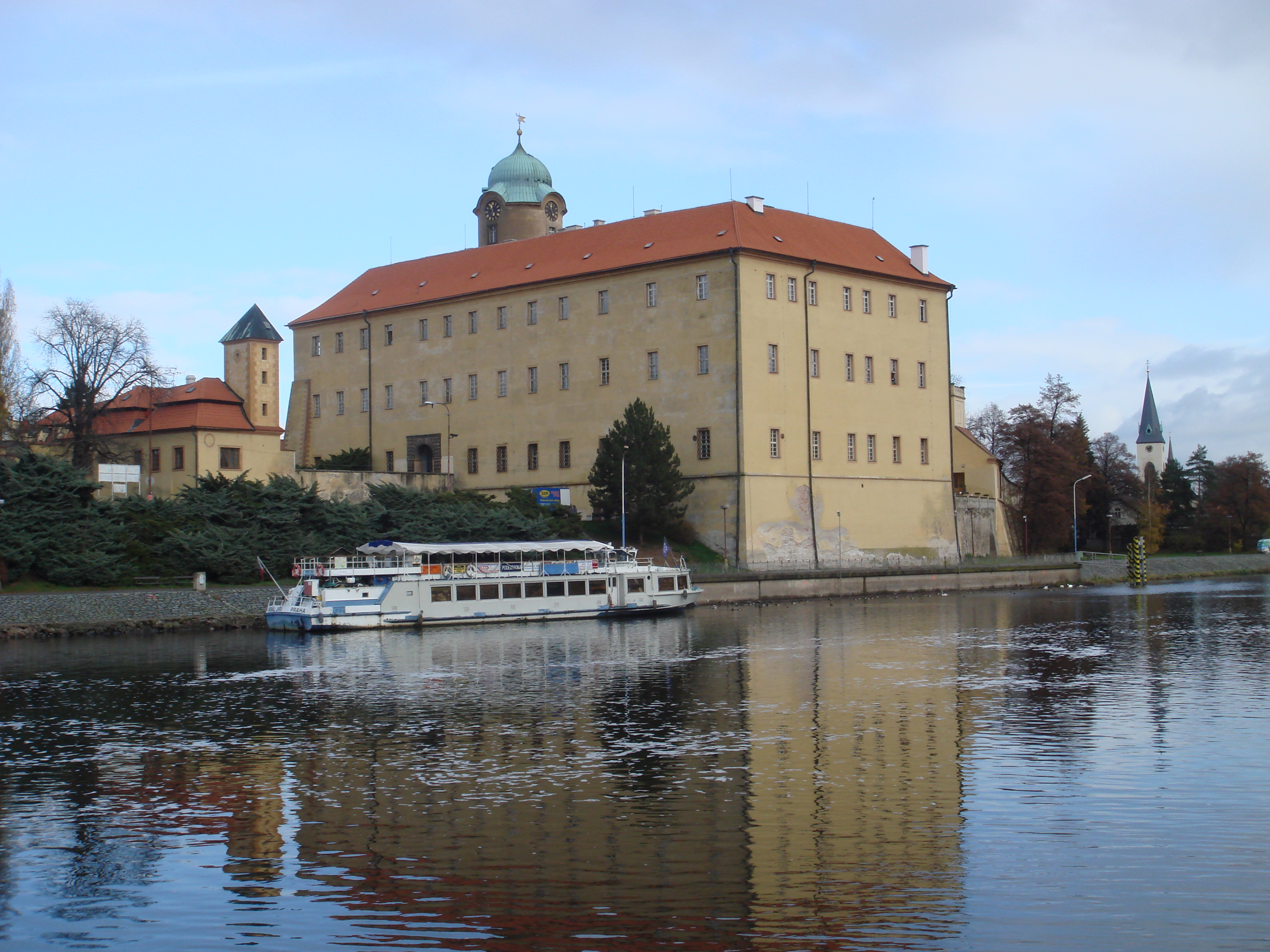
View from the river

Poděbrady Castle (Czech: Zámek Poděbrady) is a castle in the town of Poděbrady in the Czech Republic.

== History ==
A wooden fortress originally stood at the site of the present castle. King Ottokar II of Bohemia replaced it by a stone castle, which became the seat of the Lordship of Poděbrady. King John of Bohemia pledged the Lordship and the Castle to Hynek of Lichtenburg in 1345. When in 1350, Hynek's daughter Eliška married Boček I of Poděbrady (d. 1373), the castle came into the possession of the Kunštát family. After Emperor Charles IV gave Poděbrady to Boček as a hereditary possession, Boček called himself Boček of Poděbrady, thereby founding the Poděbrady line of the Kunštát family.

According to legend, King George of Poděbrady, Boček's great-grandson, was born in the castle. After George's death in 1471, the Castle and Lordship of Poděbrady were inherited by his son, Henry the Younger of Poděbrady, whose heirs had to transfer ownership of both the castle and the lordship to King Vladislaus II in 1495. Both were pledged several times before the loan was repaid by King Ferdinand I. They remained in the possession of the Bohemian Crown until 1839.

The castle was rebuilt several times. Between 1548 and 1580, it was reconstructed to a Renaissance style, after a design by Giovanni and Ulrico Aostalli and Hans Vienna. After the Thirty Years' War, the castle lost most of its importance. In 1723 and 1724, it was reconstructed in a Baroque style under the direction of the builder Franz Maximilian Kanka. Further modifications were made after 1750. Maria Theresa, in her capacity as Queen of Bohemia, stayed at the castle on several occasions. Under her son Joseph II, the castle was the residence of retired Imperial Army officers.

In 1839, the Crown sold the Castle and the Lordship to the Viennese banker Georg Simon Sina (1783–1856). Through marriage, the castle came into the possession of the Counts of Ypsilanti in 1884.
