= Nová Ves (Rychnov nad Kněžnou District) =

- Municipality
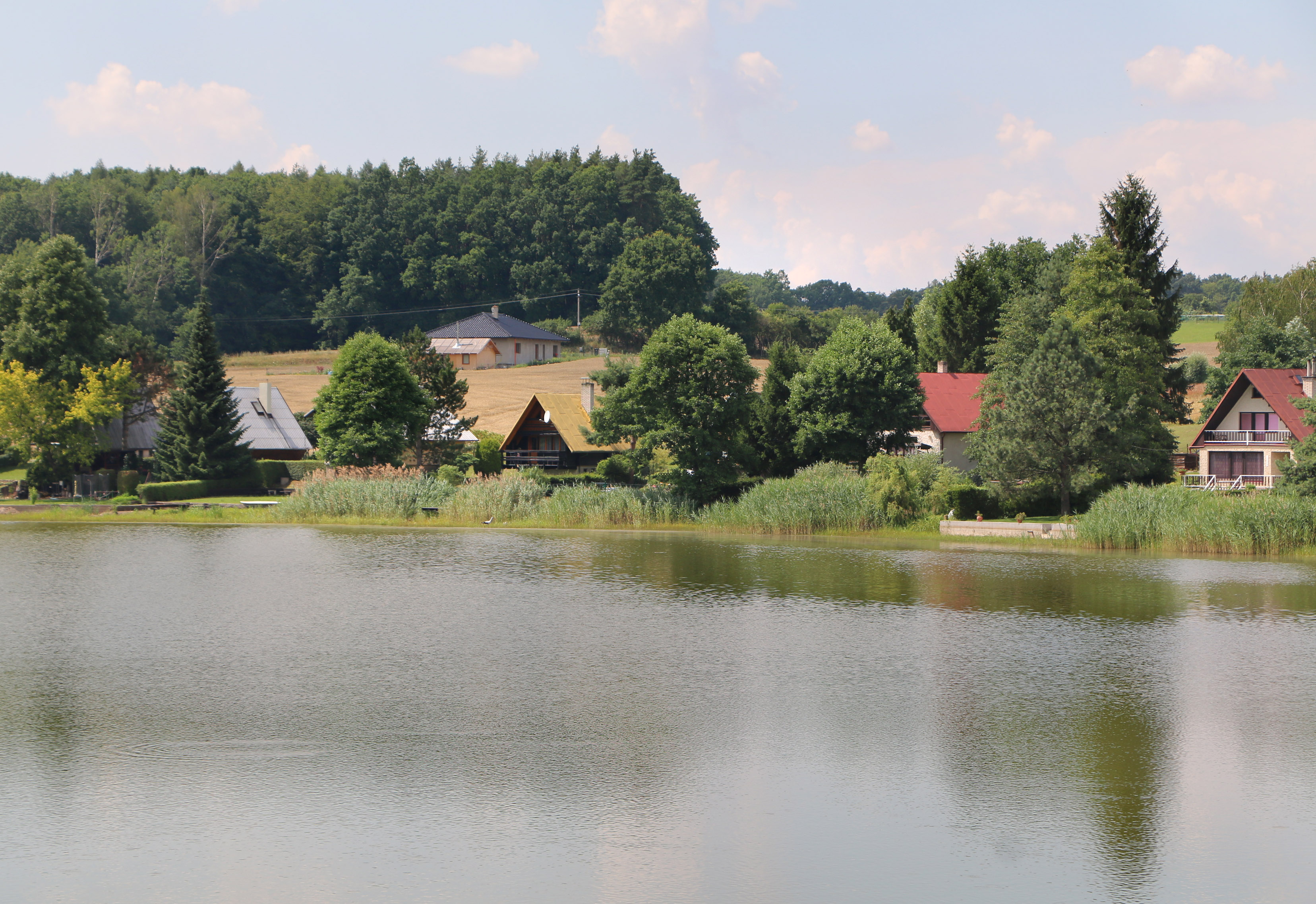
- Fishpond Novoveský rybník

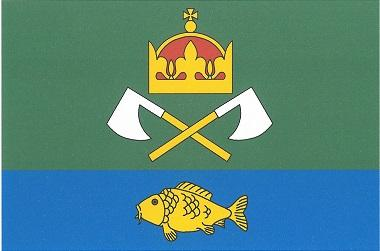
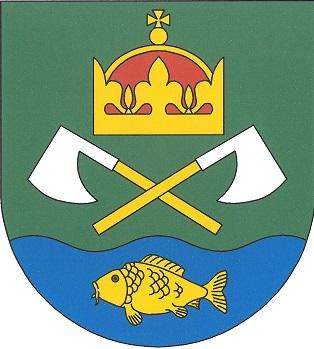
- Flag Coat of arms

- Location in the Czech Republic
- Coordinates: 50°7′51″N 16°3′0″E
- Country: Czech Republic
- Region: Hradec Králové
- District: Rychnov nad Kněžnou
- First mentioned: 1575

Area
  - Total: 8.42 km^{2} (3.25 sq mi)
- Elevation: 276 m (906 ft)

Population (2026-01-01)
  - Total: 243
  - Density: 28.9/km^{2} (74.7/sq mi)
- Time zone: UTC+1 (CET)
  - Summer (DST): UTC+2 (CEST)
- Postal code: 517 21
- Website: www.novavesobec.cz

Nová Ves is a municipality and village in Rychnov nad Kněžnou District in the Hradec Králové Region of the Czech Republic. It has about 200 inhabitants.

== Demographics ==
Historical population
Year	Pop.	±%
1869	299	—
1880	326	+9.0%
1890	310	−4.9%
1900	316	+1.9%
1910	301	−4.7%
1921	312	+3.7%
1930	294	−5.8%
1950	230	−21.8%
1961	240	+4.3%
1970	247	+2.9%
1980	190	−23.1%
1991	165	−13.2%
2001	139	−15.8%
2011	161	+15.8%
2021	221	+37.3%
Source: Censuses
