= Svídnice =

Svídnice may refer to places in the Czech Republic:

- Svídnice (Chrudim District), a municipality and village in the Pardubice Region
- Svídnice (Rychnov nad Kněžnou District), a municipality and village in the Hradec Králové Region
- Svídnice, a village and part of Dymokury in the Central Bohemian Region
- Schweinitz (stream) (Czech: Svídnice), a stream in the Czech Republic and Germany

== See also ==
- Świdnica, a city in Poland called Svídnice in Czech
