= Olešnice =

Olešnice may refer to places in the Czech Republic:

- Olešnice (Blansko District), a town in the South Moravian Region
- Olešnice (České Budějovice District), a municipality and village in the South Bohemian Region
- Olešnice (Hradec Králové District), a municipality and village in the Hradec Králové Region
- Olešnice (Rychnov nad Kněžnou District), a municipality and village in the Hradec Králové Region
- Olešnice (Semily District), a municipality and village in the Liberec Region
- Olešnice v Orlických horách, a municipality and village in the Hradec Králové Region
- Olešnice, a village and part of Bouzov in the Olomouc Region
- Olešnice, a village and part of Červený Kostelec in the Hradec Králové Region
- Olešnice, a village and part of Okrouhlice in the Vysočina Region
- Olešnice, a village and part of Ústí nad Labem in the Ústí nad Labem Region
