= Krchleby =

Krchleby may refer to places in the Czech Republic:

- Krchleby (Kutná Hora District), a municipality and village in the Central Bohemian Region
- Krchleby (Nymburk District), a municipality and village in the Central Bohemian Region
- Krchleby (Rychnov nad Kněžnou District), a municipality and village in the Hradec Králové Region
- Krchleby (Šumperk District), a municipality and village in the Olomouc Region
- Krchleby, a village and part of Křečovice in the Central Bohemian Region
- Krchleby, a village and part of Staňkov (Domažlice District) in the Plzeň Region
