= Chlístov =

Chlístov may refer to places in the Czech Republic:

- Chlístov (Benešov District), a municipality and village in the Central Bohemian Region
- Chlístov (Rychnov nad Kněžnou District), a municipality and village in the Hradec Králové Region
- Chlístov (Třebíč District), a municipality and village in the Vysočina Region
- Chlístov, a village and part of Hořičky in the Hradec Králové Region
- Chlístov, a village and part of Kratušín in the South Bohemian Region
- Chlístov, a village and part of Nadějkov in the South Bohemian Region
- Chlístov, a village and part of Neustupov in the Central Bohemian Region
- Chlístov, a village and part of Okrouhlice in the Vysočina Region
- Chlístov, a village and part of Všelibice in the Liberec Region
- Chlístov, a village and part of Železný Brod in the Liberec Region

== See also ==
- Chlistov, a municipality and village in the Plzeň Region
