= Rychnov nad Kněžnou District =

Rychnov nad Kněžnou District Okres Rychnov nad Kněžnou
- District
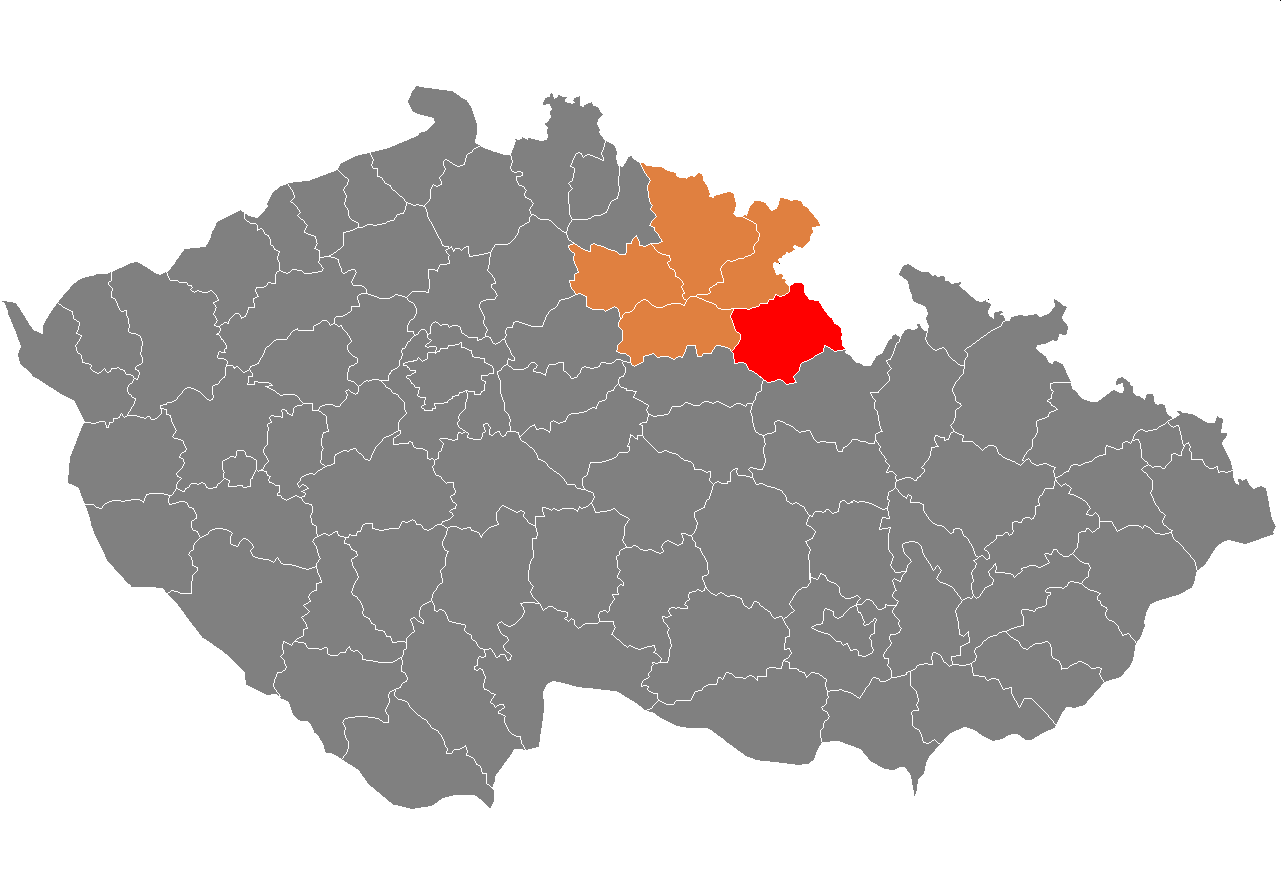
- Location in the Hradec Králové Region within the Czech Republic
- Coordinates: 50°14′N 16°17′E
- Country: Czech Republic
- Region: Hradec Králové
- Capital: Rychnov nad Kněžnou

Area
  - Total: 982.08 km^{2} (379.18 sq mi)

Population (2026)
  - Total: 81,263
  - Density: 82.746/km^{2} (214.31/sq mi)
- Time zone: UTC+1 (CET)
  - Summer (DST): UTC+2 (CEST)
- Municipalities: 80
- * Towns: 9
- * Market towns: 2

Rychnov nad Kněžnou District (Czech: okres Rychnov nad Kněžnou) is a district in the Hradec Králové Region of the Czech Republic. Its capital is the town of Rychnov nad Kněžnou.

== Administrative division ==
Rychnov nad Kněžnou District is divided into three administrative districts of municipalities with extended competence: Rychnov nad Kněžnou, Dobruška and Kostelec nad Orlicí.

=== List of municipalities ===
Towns are marked in bold and market towns in italics:

Albrechtice nad Orlicí - Bačetín - Bartošovice v Orlických horách - Bílý Újezd - Bohdašín - Bolehošť - Borohrádek - Borovnice - Bystré - Byzhradec - Častolovice - Čermná nad Orlicí - Černíkovice - České Meziříčí - Čestice - Chleny - Chlístov - Deštné v Orlických horách - Dobřany - Dobré - Dobruška - Doudleby nad Orlicí - Hřibiny-Ledská - Jahodov - Janov - Javornice - Kostelec nad Orlicí - Kostelecké Horky - Kounov - Králova Lhota - Krchleby - Kvasiny - Lhoty u Potštejna - Libel - Liberk - Lično - Lípa nad Orlicí - Lukavice - Lupenice - Mokré - Nová Ves - Očelice - Ohnišov - Olešnice - Olešnice v Orlických horách - Opočno - Orlické Záhoří - Osečnice - Pěčín - Podbřezí - Pohoří - Polom - Potštejn - Přepychy - Proruby - Říčky v Orlických horách - Rohenice - Rokytnice v Orlických horách - Rybná nad Zdobnicí - Rychnov nad Kněžnou - Sedloňov - Semechnice - Skuhrov nad Bělou - Slatina nad Zdobnicí - Sněžné - Solnice - Svídnice - Synkov-Slemeno - Třebešov - Trnov - Tutleky - Týniště nad Orlicí - Val - Vamberk - Voděrady - Vrbice - Záměl - Žďár nad Orlicí Zdelov - Zdobnice

== Geography ==
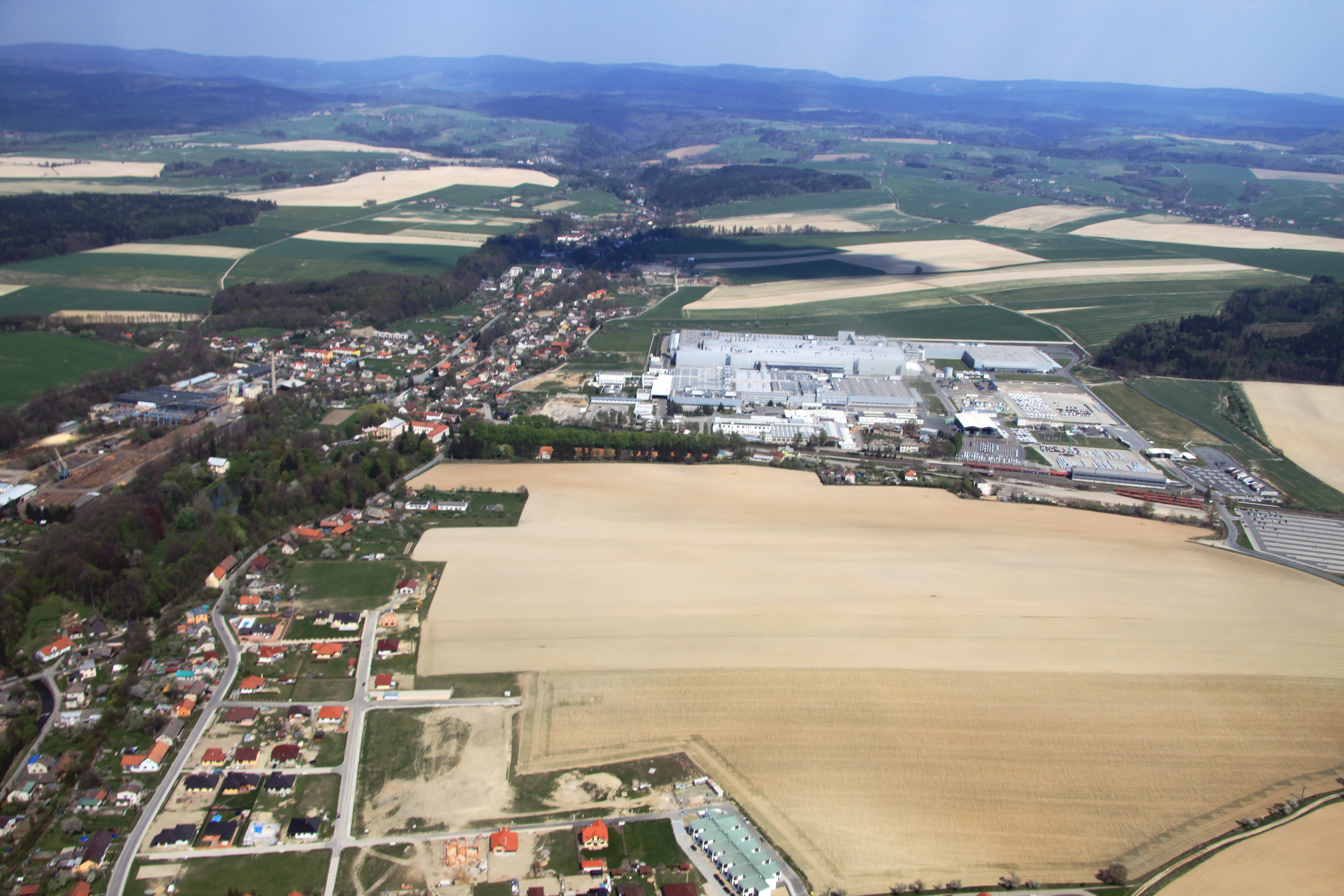
Kvasiny and surrounding landscape

Rychnov nad Kněžnou District borders Poland in the east. The terrain is very varied, in the east it is mountainous and towards the west it becomes foothills and then flat. The territory extends into four geomorphological mesoregions: Orlice Table (west), Orlické Foothills (centre), Orlické Mountains (east) and Svitavy Uplands (small part in the southwest). The highest point of the district is the mountain Velká Deštná in Deštné v Orlických horách with an elevation of 1,116 m (3,661 ft). The lowest point is the river bed of the Orlice in Týniště nad Orlicí at 240 m (787 ft).

From the total district area of 982.1 km^{2} (379.2 sq mi), agricultural land occupies 520.1 km^{2} (200.8 sq mi), forests occupy 373.1 km^{2} (144.1 sq mi), and water area occupies 13.4 km^{2} (5.2 sq mi). Forests cover 38.0% of the district's area.

The most significant river is the Divoká Orlice, which forms the Czech–Polish border and then crosses the district in the south. It then connects with the Tichá Orlice within the district to form the Orlice River. Other notable rivers are the Dědina, Bělá and Zdobnice. The largest body of water is the fishpond Broumar with an area of 67 ha (170 acres).

Orlické hory is a protected landscape area that covers the eastern part of the district.

== Demographics ==
Historical population

Year	Pop.	±%
1869	101,194	—
1880	105,070	+3.8%
1890	105,913	+0.8%
1900	103,483	−2.3%
1910	104,203	+0.7%

Year	Pop.	±%
1921	98,019	−5.9%
1930	95,802	−2.3%
1950	74,322	−22.4%
1961	77,122	+3.8%
1970	76,751	−0.5%

Year	Pop.	±%
1980	79,491	+3.6%
1991	78,144	−1.7%
2001	78,294	+0.2%
2011	77,829	−0.6%
2021	77,580	−0.3%

Source: Censuses

=== Most populous municipalities ===
Name	Population	Area (km^{2})
Rychnov nad Kněžnou	11,693	35
Dobruška	6,445	34
Kostelec nad Orlicí	6,224	26
Týniště nad Orlicí	6,133	52
Vamberk	4,580	21
Opočno	3,118	14
Solnice	2,515	13
Rokytnice v Orlických horách	2,113	40
Borohrádek	2,059	14
České Meziříčí	2,044	22

== Economy ==
The largest employers with headquarters in Rychnov nad Kněžnou District and at least 500 employees are:

Economic entity	Location	Number of employees	Main activity
Federal-Mogul Friction Products	Kostelec nad Orlicí	500–999	Automotive industry
Assa Abloy Opening Solutions CZ	Rychnov nad Kněžnou	500–999	Manufacture of locks and hinges

The main employer is the factory of Škoda Auto in Kvasiny with about 9,000 employees.

== Transport ==
There are no motorways passing through the district. The most important roads are the I/11 from Hradec Králové to Šumperk and the I/14 from Náchod to Ústí nad Orlicí.

== Sights ==
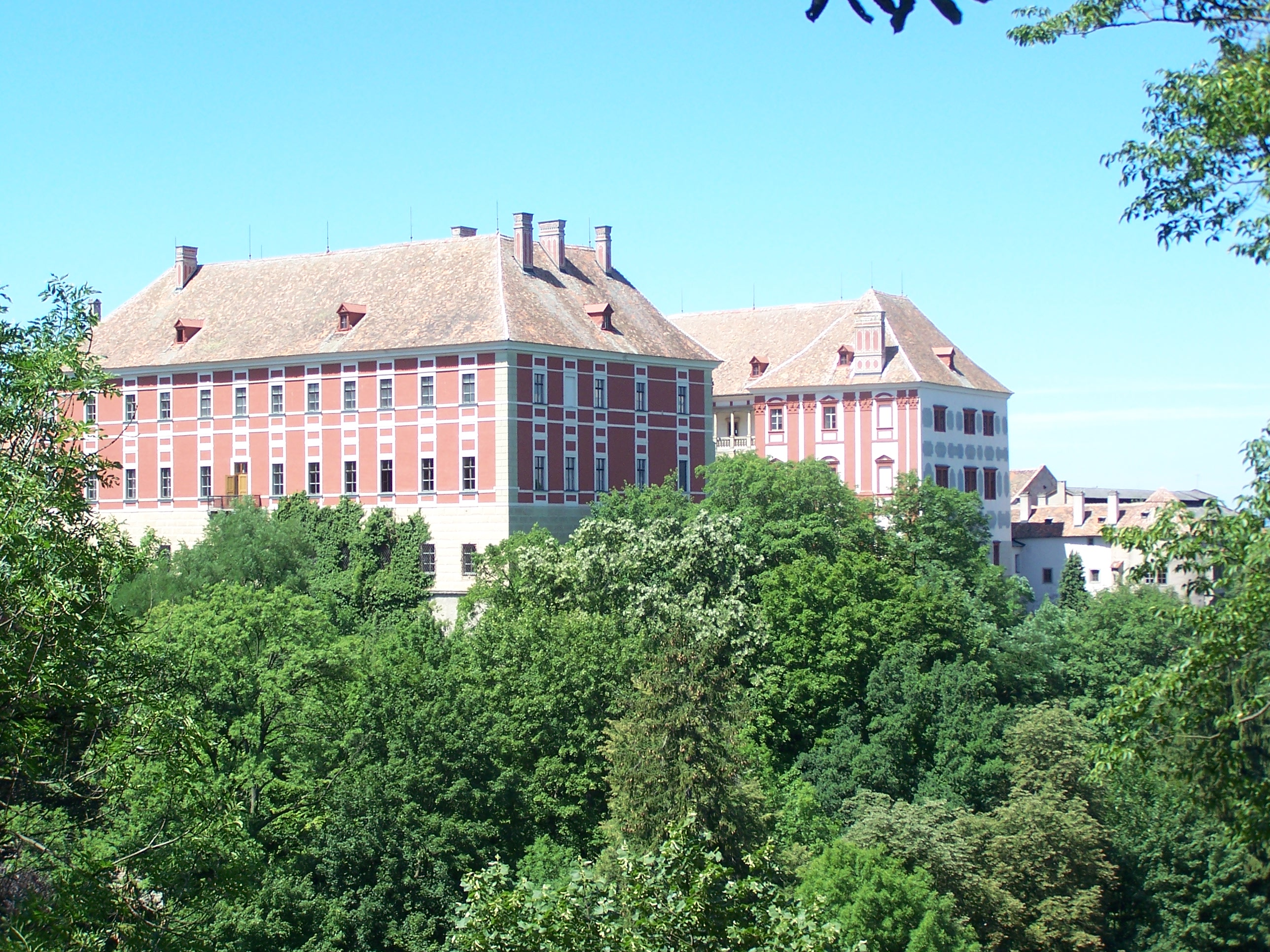
Opočno Castle

The most important monuments in the district, protected as national cultural monuments, are:

- Opočno Castle
- Church of Saints Peter and Paul in Liberk
- Church of Our Lady of Sorrows in Lhoty u Potštejna

The best-preserved settlements, protected as monument zones, are:

- Dobruška
- Opočno
- Rokytnice v Orlických horách
- Rychnov nad Kněžnou
- Zdobnice-Kačerov

The most visited tourist destination is the Velká Deštná observation tower.
