= Rohenice =

- Municipality
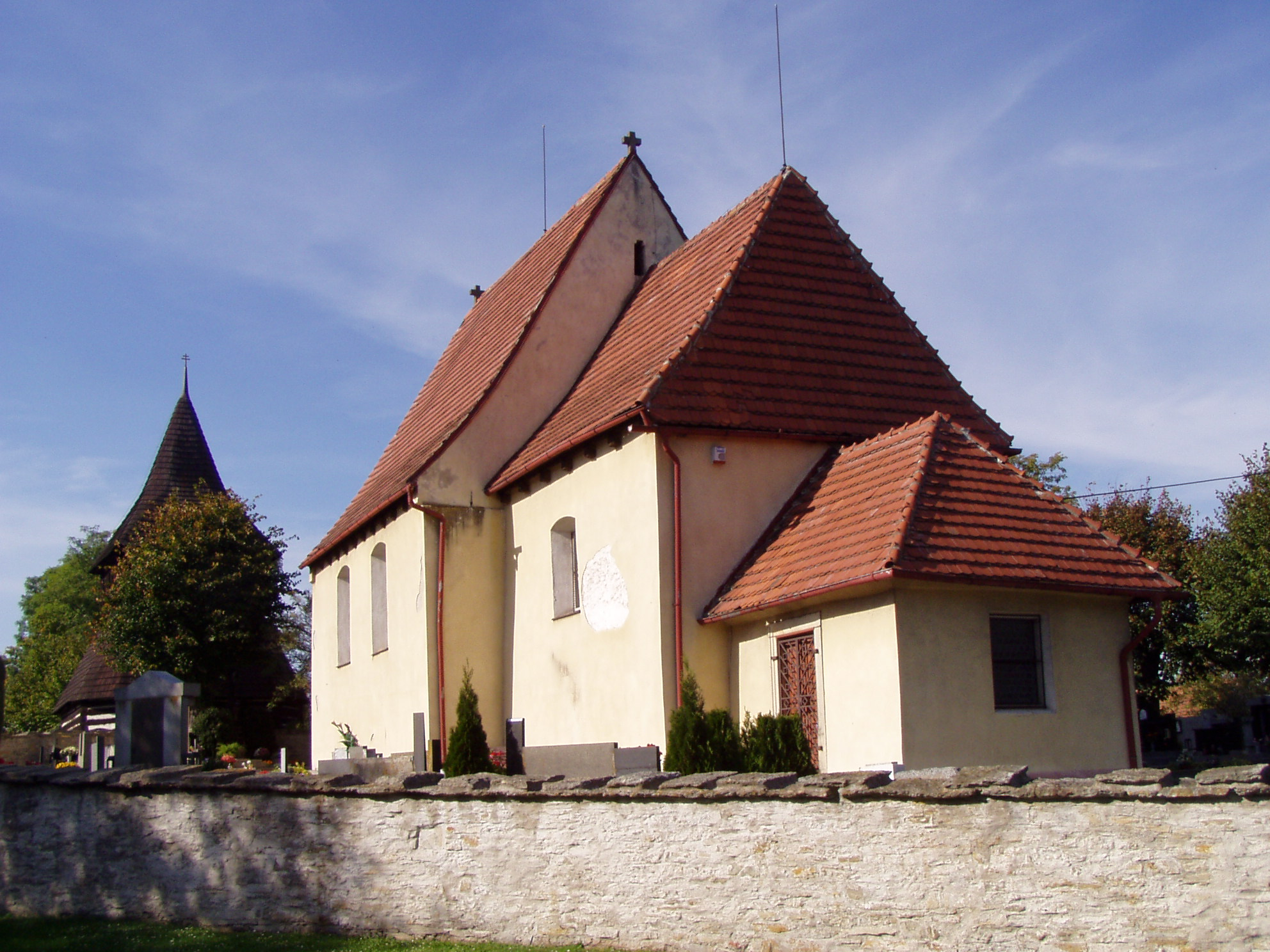
- Church of Saint John the Baptist

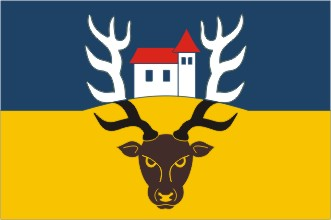
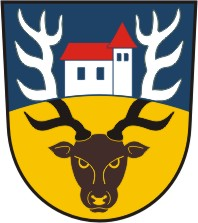
- Flag Coat of arms

- Location in the Czech Republic
- Coordinates: 50°18′34″N 16°1′56″E
- Country: Czech Republic
- Region: Hradec Králové
- District: Rychnov nad Kněžnou
- First mentioned: 1356

Area
  - Total: 3.47 km^{2} (1.34 sq mi)
- Elevation: 268 m (879 ft)

Population (2026-01-01)
  - Total: 333
  - Density: 96.0/km^{2} (249/sq mi)
- Time zone: UTC+1 (CET)
  - Summer (DST): UTC+2 (CEST)
- Postal code: 517 71
- Website: www.rohenice.cz

Rohenice is a municipality and village in Rychnov nad Kněžnou District in the Hradec Králové Region of the Czech Republic. It has about 300 inhabitants.

== Demographics ==
Historical population
Year	Pop.	±%
1869	294	—
1880	343	+16.7%
1890	317	−7.6%
1900	292	−7.9%
1910	315	+7.9%
1921	329	+4.4%
1930	286	−13.1%
1950	218	−23.8%
1961	197	−9.6%
1970	175	−11.2%
1980	195	+11.4%
1991	206	+5.6%
2001	203	−1.5%
2011	233	+14.8%
2021	279	+19.7%
Source: Censuses
