= Lupenice =

- Municipality
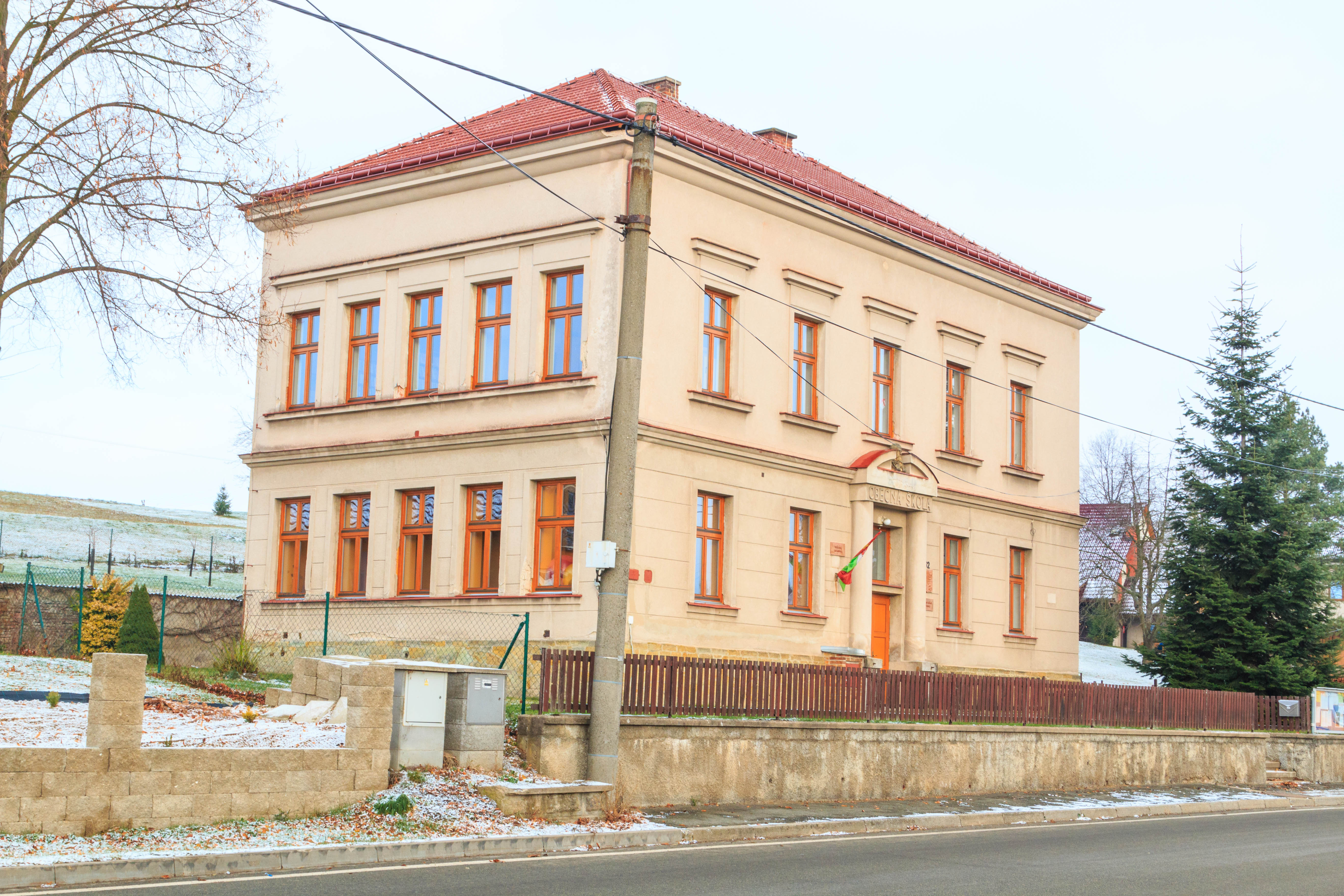
- Municipal office

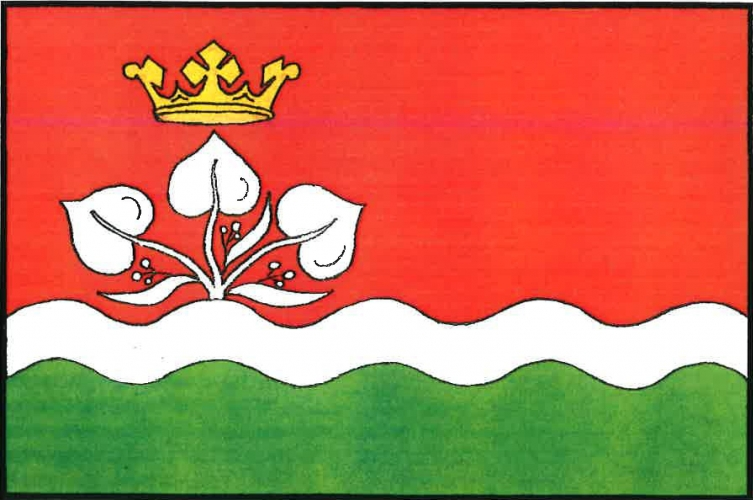
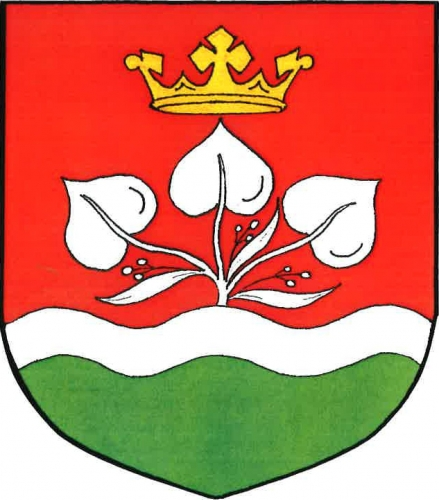
- Flag Coat of arms

- Location in the Czech Republic
- Coordinates: 50°7′59″N 16°16′26″E
- Country: Czech Republic
- Region: Hradec Králové
- District: Rychnov nad Kněžnou
- First mentioned: 1360

Area
  - Total: 4.42 km^{2} (1.71 sq mi)
- Elevation: 330 m (1,080 ft)

Population (2026-01-01)
  - Total: 279
  - Density: 63.1/km^{2} (163/sq mi)
- Time zone: UTC+1 (CET)
  - Summer (DST): UTC+2 (CEST)
- Postal code: 517 41
- Website: www.obeclupenice.cz

Lupenice is a municipality and village in Rychnov nad Kněžnou District in the Hradec Králové Region of the Czech Republic. It has about 300 inhabitants.

== Demographics ==
Historical population
Year	Pop.	±%
1869	383	—
1880	399	+4.2%
1890	377	−5.5%
1900	395	+4.8%
1910	427	+8.1%
1921	401	−6.1%
1930	370	−7.7%
1950	302	−18.4%
1961	298	−1.3%
1970	298	+0.0%
1980	252	−15.4%
1991	256	+1.6%
2001	241	−5.9%
2011	260	+7.9%
2021	273	+5.0%
Source: Censuses
