= Lhoty u Potštejna =

- Municipality
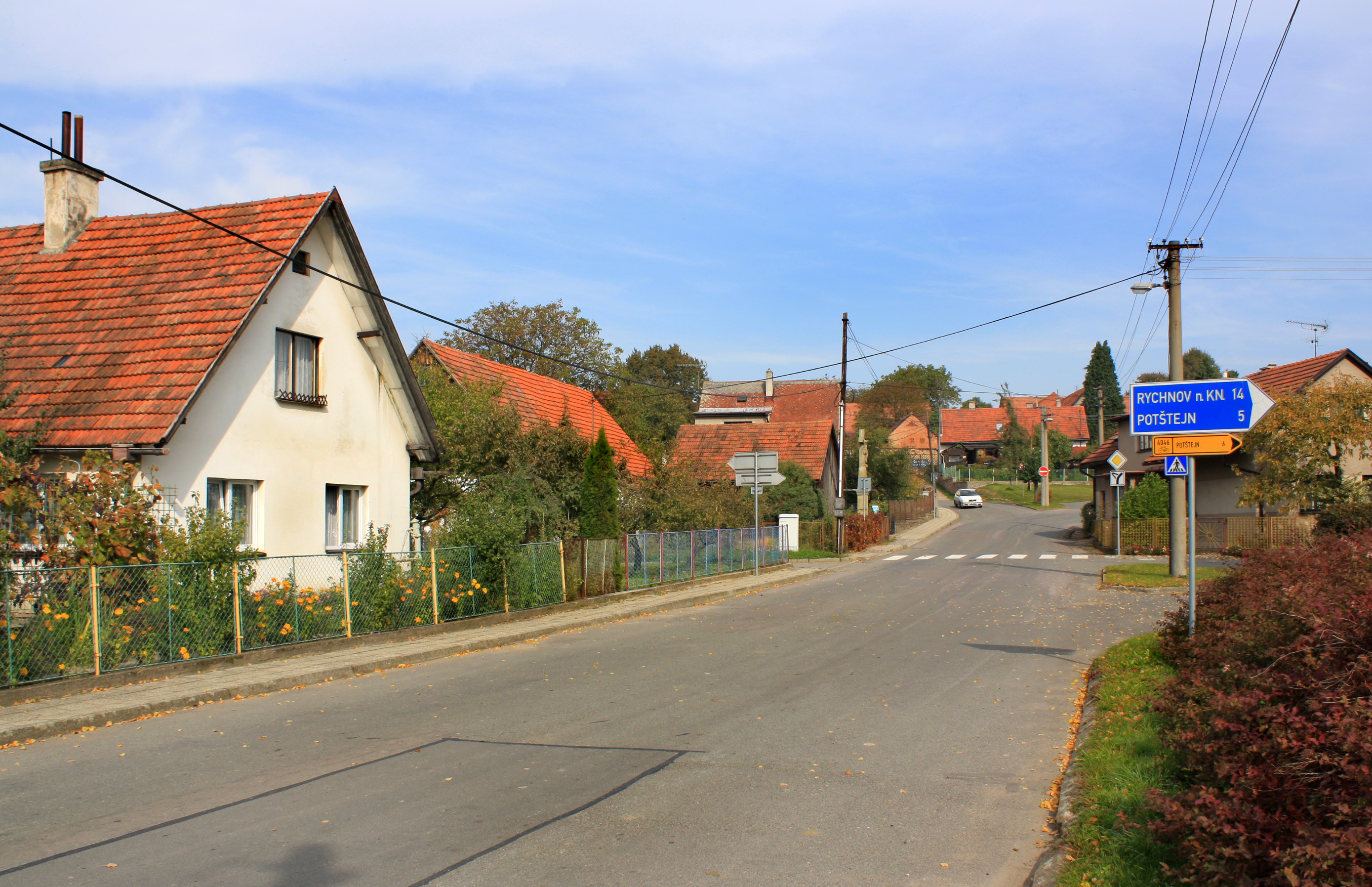
- Main street

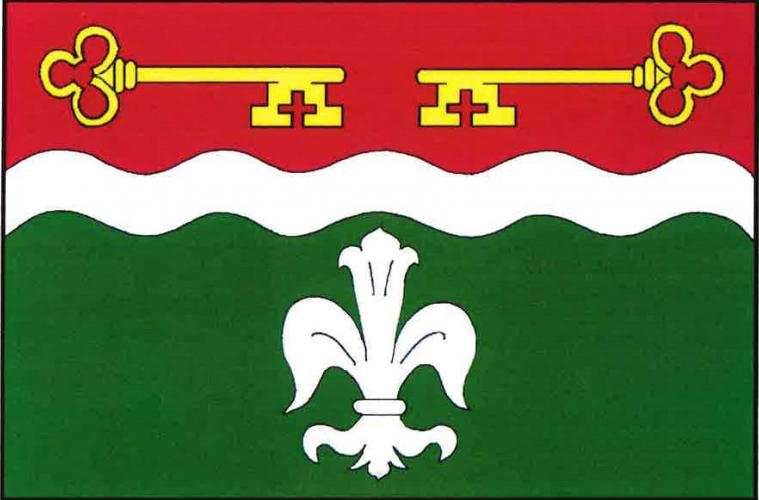
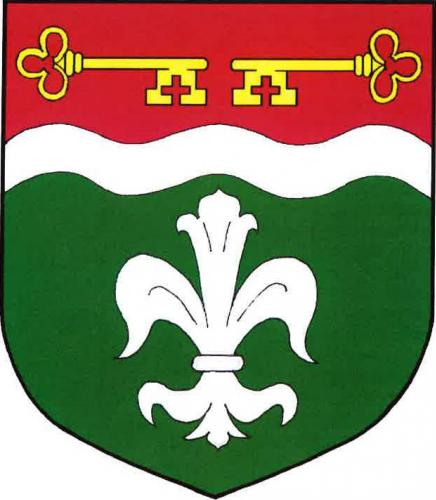
- Flag Coat of arms

- Location in the Czech Republic
- Coordinates: 50°3′21″N 16°16′8″E
- Country: Czech Republic
- Region: Hradec Králové
- District: Rychnov nad Kněžnou
- First mentioned: 1352

Area
  - Total: 5.72 km^{2} (2.21 sq mi)
- Elevation: 335 m (1,099 ft)

Population (2026-01-01)
  - Total: 353
  - Density: 61.7/km^{2} (160/sq mi)
- Time zone: UTC+1 (CET)
  - Summer (DST): UTC+2 (CEST)
- Postal code: 517 41
- Website: www.obeclhoty.cz

Lhoty u Potštejna is a municipality and village in Rychnov nad Kněžnou District in the Hradec Králové Region of the Czech Republic. It has about 400 inhabitants.

== Demographics ==
Historical population
Year	Pop.	±%
1869	453	—
1880	491	+8.4%
1890	499	+1.6%
1900	429	−14.0%
1910	397	−7.5%
1921	395	−0.5%
1930	390	−1.3%
1950	350	−10.3%
1961	383	+9.4%
1970	345	−9.9%
1980	310	−10.1%
1991	278	−10.3%
2001	255	−8.3%
2011	269	+5.5%
2021	343	+27.5%
Source: Censuses
