= Bohdašín =

- Municipality
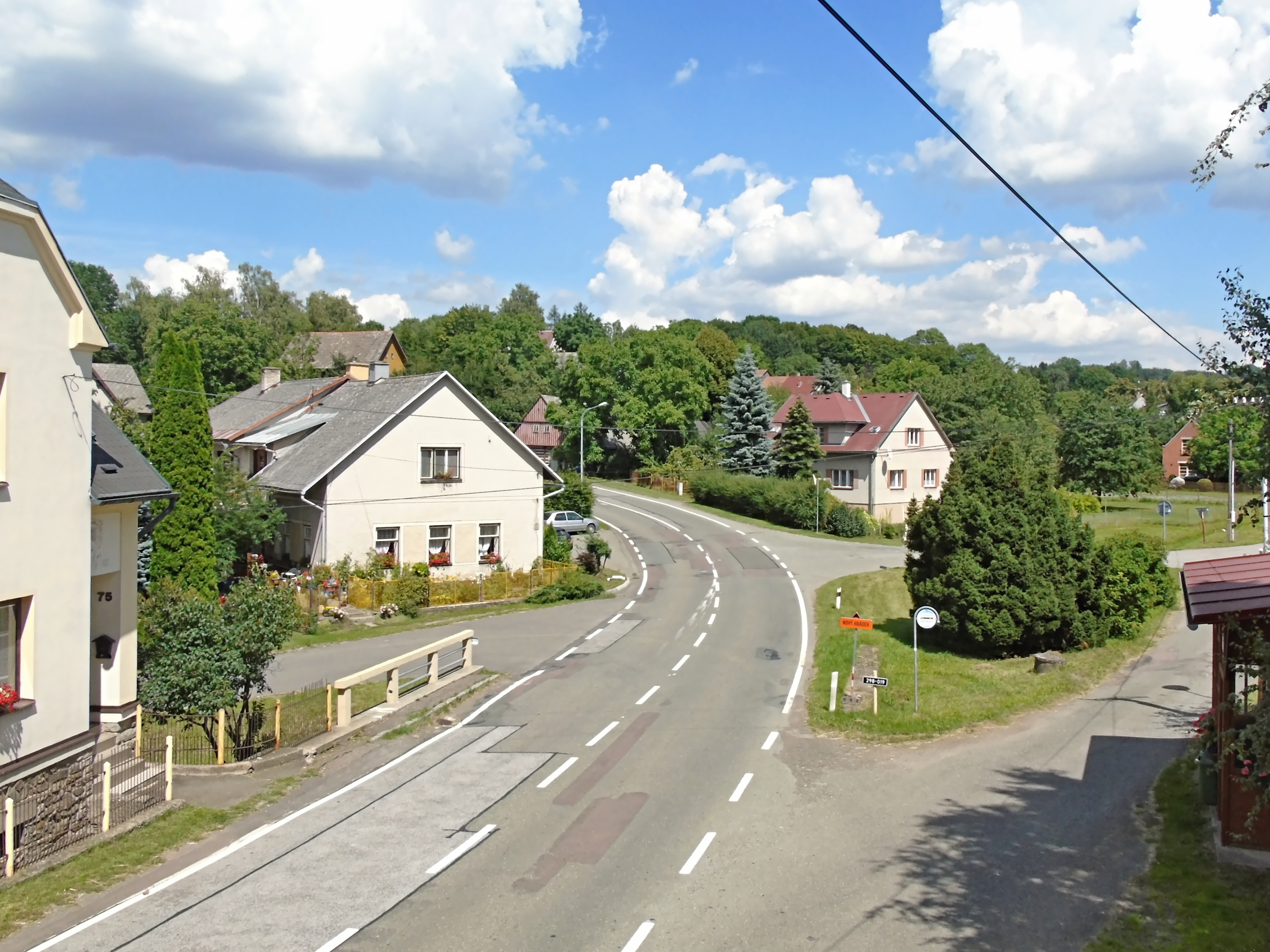
- Centre of Bohdašín

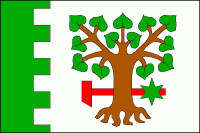
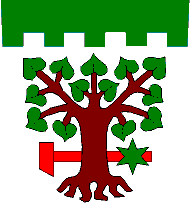
- Flag Coat of arms

- Location in the Czech Republic
- Coordinates: 50°20′19″N 16°13′30″E
- Country: Czech Republic
- Region: Hradec Králové
- District: Rychnov nad Kněžnou
- First mentioned: 1544

Area
  - Total: 5.36 km^{2} (2.07 sq mi)
- Elevation: 485 m (1,591 ft)

Population (2026-01-01)
  - Total: 203
  - Density: 37.9/km^{2} (98.1/sq mi)
- Time zone: UTC+1 (CET)
  - Summer (DST): UTC+2 (CEST)
- Postal code: 518 01
- Website: www.bohdasin.cz

Bohdašín is a municipality and village in Rychnov nad Kněžnou District in the Hradec Králové Region of the Czech Republic. It has about 200 inhabitants.

== Administrative division ==
Bohdašín consists of two municipal parts (in brackets population according to the 2021 census):

- Bohdašín (171)
- Vanovka (22)

== Demographics ==
Historical population
Year	Pop.	±%
1869	533	—
1880	535	+0.4%
1890	583	+9.0%
1900	525	−9.9%
1910	497	−5.3%
1921	484	−2.6%
1930	442	−8.7%
1950	310	−29.9%
1961	299	−3.5%
1970	284	−5.0%
1980	256	−9.9%
1991	208	−18.8%
2001	222	+6.7%
2011	224	+0.9%
2021	193	−13.8%
Source: Censuses
