= Proruby =

- Municipality
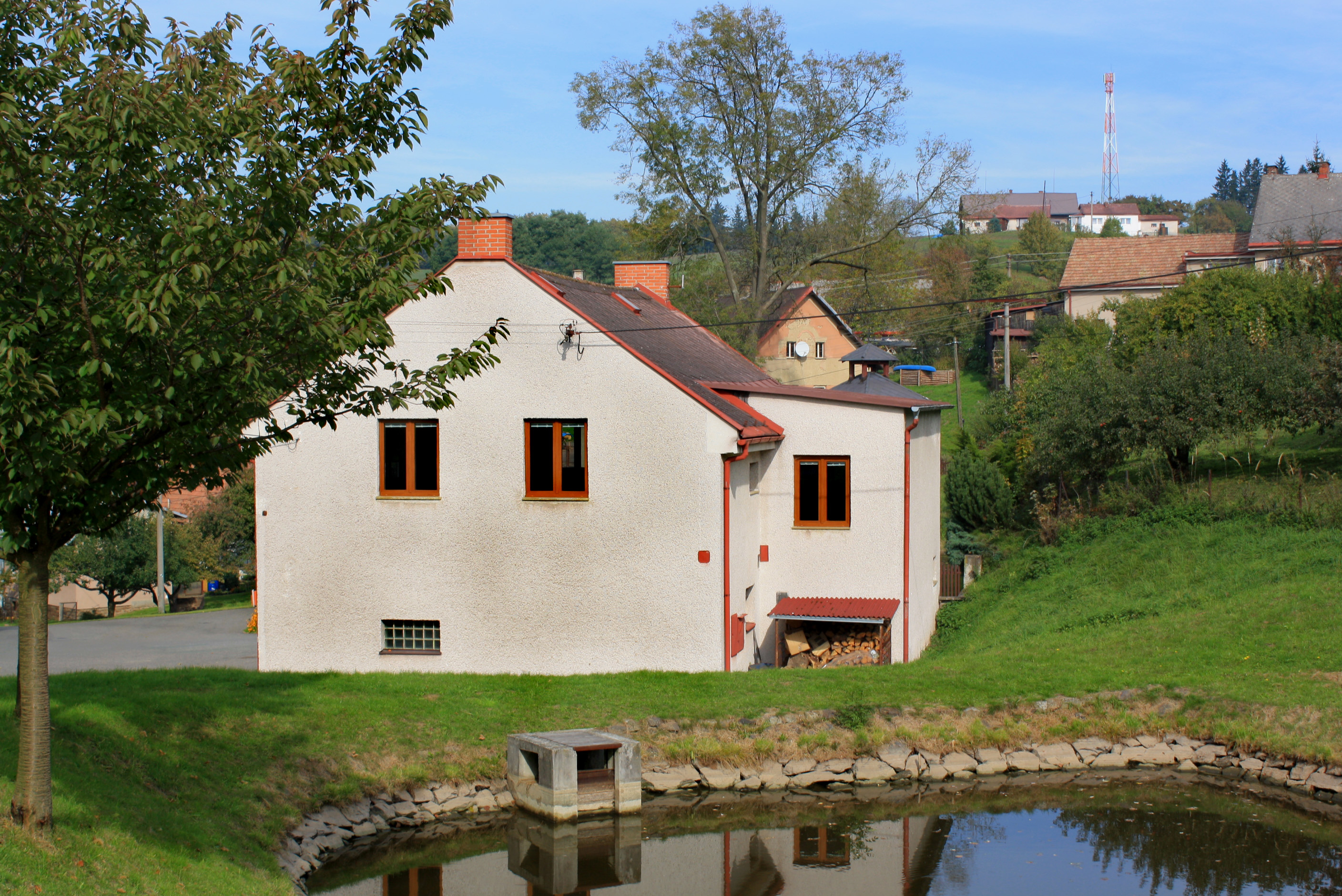
- Municipal office

- Location in the Czech Republic
- Coordinates: 50°4′14″N 16°17′43″E
- Country: Czech Republic
- Region: Hradec Králové
- District: Rychnov nad Kněžnou
- First mentioned: 1497

Area
  - Total: 2.53 km^{2} (0.98 sq mi)
- Elevation: 480 m (1,570 ft)

Population (2026-01-01)
  - Total: 56
  - Density: 22/km^{2} (57/sq mi)
- Time zone: UTC+1 (CET)
  - Summer (DST): UTC+2 (CEST)
- Postal code: 517 41
- Website: proruby.webnode.cz

Proruby is a municipality and village in Rychnov nad Kněžnou District in the Hradec Králové Region of the Czech Republic. It has about 60 inhabitants.

== Demographics ==
Historical population
| Year | Pop. | ±% |
|---|---|---|
| 1869 | 359 | — |
| 1880 | 343 | −4.5% |
| 1890 | 315 | −8.2% |
| 1900 | 308 | −2.2% |
| 1910 | 301 | −2.3% |
| 1921 | 277 | −8.0% |
| 1930 | 261 | −5.8% |
| 1950 | 204 | −21.8% |
| 1961 | 148 | −27.5% |
| 1970 | 115 | −22.3% |
| 1980 | 83 | −27.8% |
| 1991 | 55 | −33.7% |
| 2001 | 52 | −5.5% |
| 2011 | 58 | +11.5% |
| 2021 | 49 | −15.5% |
Source: Censuses
