= Chleny =

- Municipality
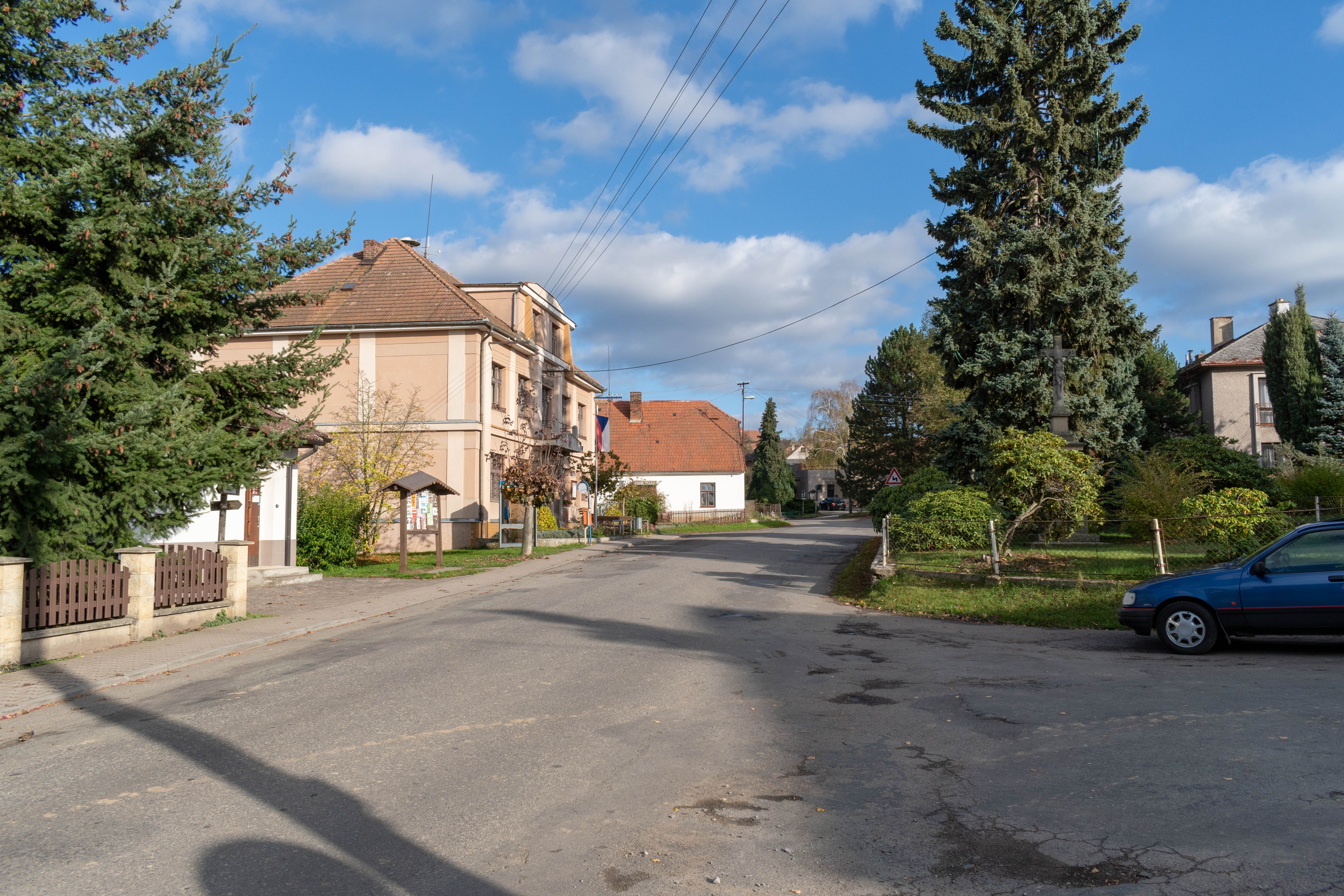
- Centre of Chleny

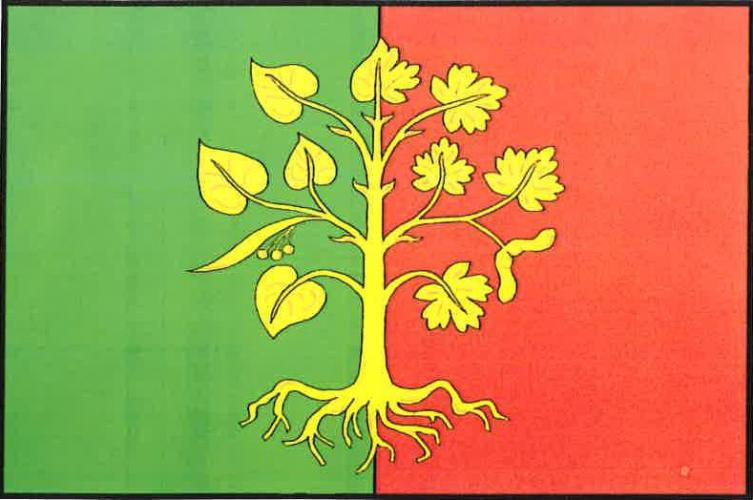
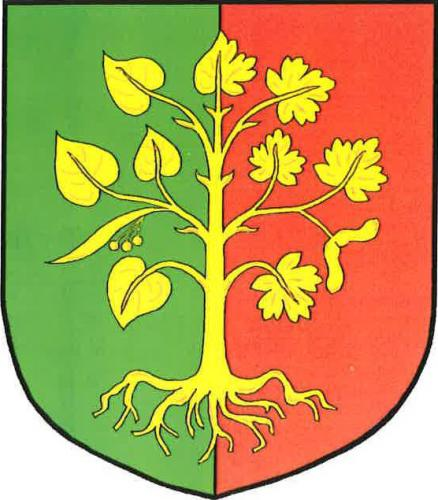
- Flag Coat of arms

- Location in the Czech Republic
- Coordinates: 50°4′40″N 16°14′38″E
- Country: Czech Republic
- Region: Hradec Králové
- District: Rychnov nad Kněžnou
- First mentioned: 1353

Area
  - Total: 4.09 km^{2} (1.58 sq mi)
- Elevation: 368 m (1,207 ft)

Population (2026-01-01)
  - Total: 201
  - Density: 49.1/km^{2} (127/sq mi)
- Time zone: UTC+1 (CET)
  - Summer (DST): UTC+2 (CEST)
- Postal code: 517 41
- Website: www.chleny.cz

Chleny is a municipality and village in Rychnov nad Kněžnou District in the Hradec Králové Region of the Czech Republic. It has about 200 inhabitants.

== Demographics ==
Historical population
Year	Pop.	±%
1869	360	—
1880	411	+14.2%
1890	397	−3.4%
1900	347	−12.6%
1910	350	+0.9%
1921	318	−9.1%
1930	303	−4.7%
1950	267	−11.9%
1961	240	−10.1%
1970	224	−6.7%
1980	236	+5.4%
1991	209	−11.4%
2001	236	+12.9%
2011	214	−9.3%
2021	195	−8.9%
Source: Censuses
