= Kostelecké Horky =

- Municipality
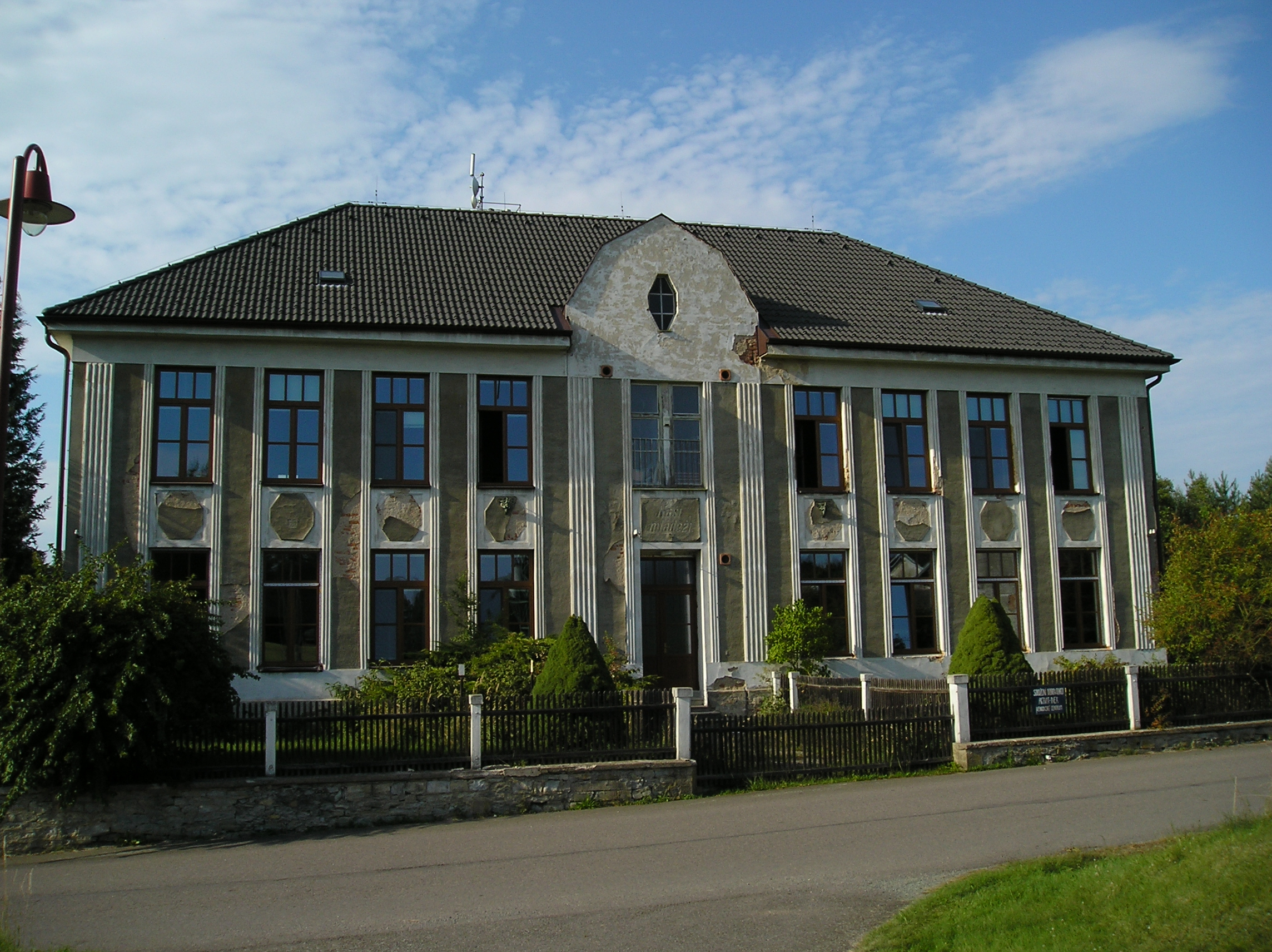
- Former school

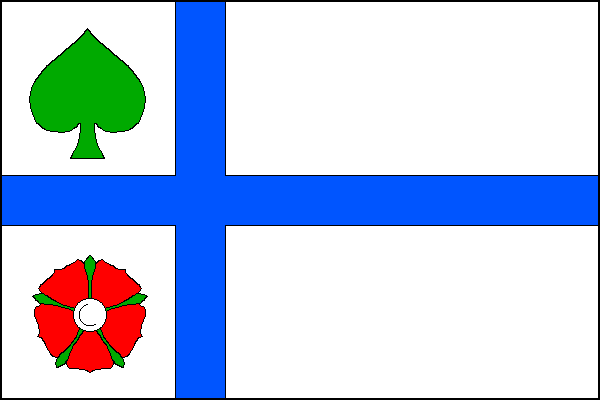
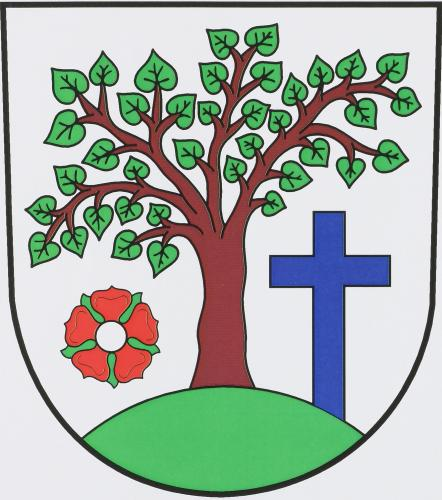
- Flag Coat of arms

- Location in the Czech Republic
- Coordinates: 50°3′6″N 16°12′25″E
- Country: Czech Republic
- Region: Hradec Králové
- District: Rychnov nad Kněžnou
- First mentioned: 1342

Area
  - Total: 13.25 km^{2} (5.12 sq mi)
- Elevation: 320 m (1,050 ft)

Population (2026-01-01)
  - Total: 177
  - Density: 13.4/km^{2} (34.6/sq mi)
- Time zone: UTC+1 (CET)
  - Summer (DST): UTC+2 (CEST)
- Postal code: 517 41
- Website: www.obec-kosteleckehorky.cz

Kostelecké Horky is a municipality and village in Rychnov nad Kněžnou District in the Hradec Králové Region of the Czech Republic. It has about 200 inhabitants.

== Demographics ==
Historical population
| Year | Pop. | ±% |
|---|---|---|
| 1869 | 334 | — |
| 1880 | 379 | +13.5% |
| 1890 | 342 | −9.8% |
| 1900 | 348 | +1.8% |
| 1910 | 314 | −9.8% |
| 1921 | 306 | −2.5% |
| 1930 | 290 | −5.2% |
| 1950 | 215 | −25.9% |
| 1961 | 183 | −14.9% |
| 1970 | 172 | −6.0% |
| 1980 | 164 | −4.7% |
| 1991 | 149 | −9.1% |
| 2001 | 143 | −4.0% |
| 2011 | 132 | −7.7% |
| 2021 | 149 | +12.9% |
Source: Censuses
