= Osečnice =

- Municipality
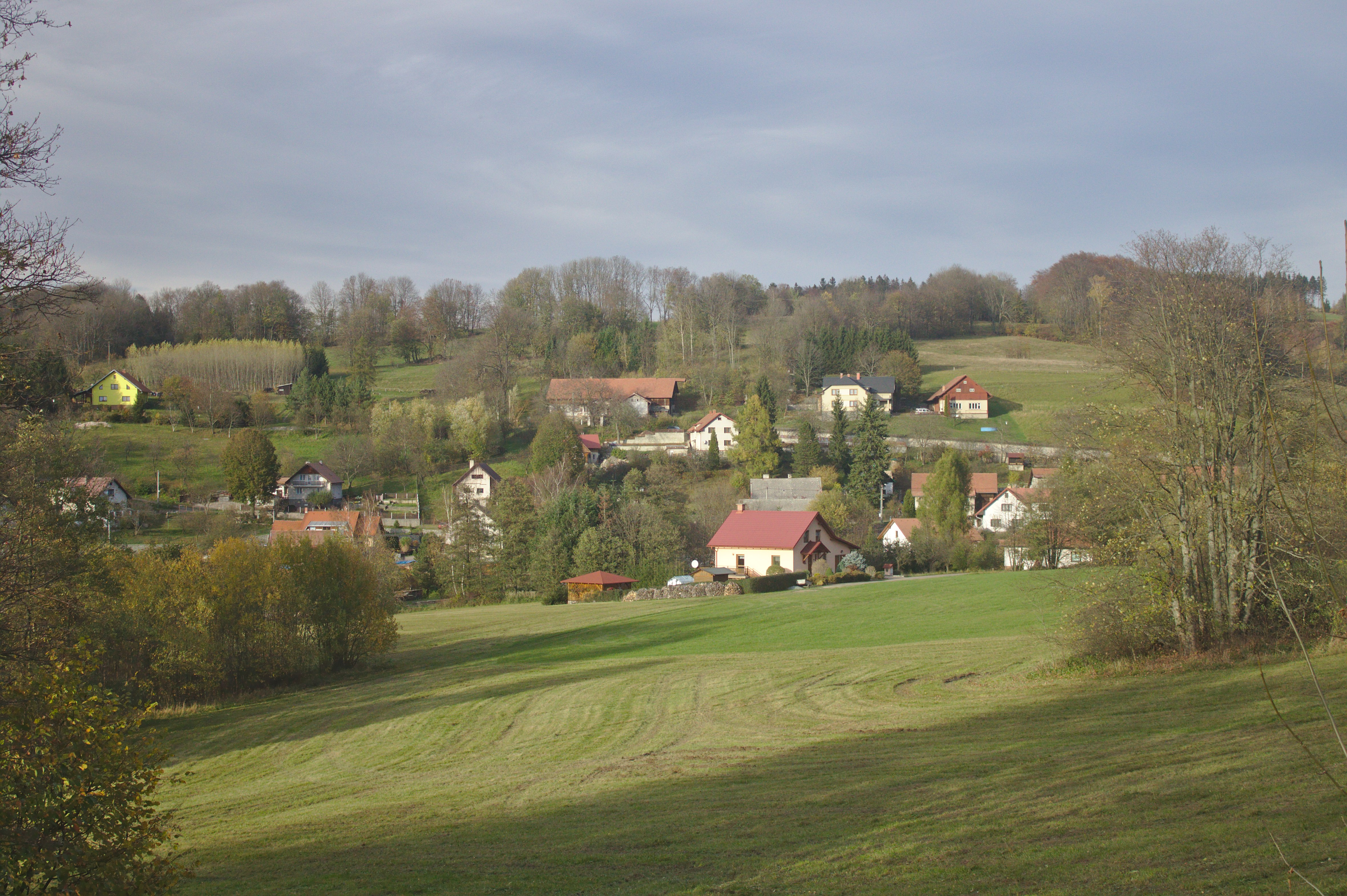
- Houses in Osečnice

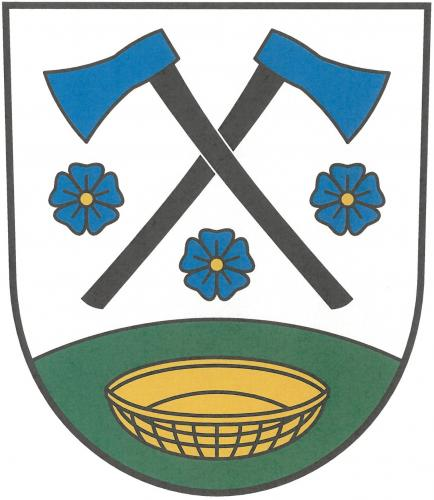
- Coat of arms

- Location in the Czech Republic
- Coordinates: 50°15′26″N 16°18′25″E
- Country: Czech Republic
- Region: Hradec Králové
- District: Rychnov nad Kněžnou
- First mentioned: 1598

Area
  - Total: 7.84 km^{2} (3.03 sq mi)
- Elevation: 545 m (1,788 ft)

Population (2026-01-01)
  - Total: 295
  - Density: 37.6/km^{2} (97.5/sq mi)
- Time zone: UTC+1 (CET)
  - Summer (DST): UTC+2 (CEST)
- Postal code: 517 03
- Website: www.osecnice.cz

Osečnice is a municipality and village in Rychnov nad Kněžnou District in the Hradec Králové Region of the Czech Republic. It has about 300 inhabitants.

== Administrative division ==
Osečnice consists of four municipal parts (in brackets population according to the 2021 census):

- Osečnice (152)
- Lomy (69)
- Proloh (58)
- Sekyrka (15)

== Demographics ==
Historical population
Year	Pop.	±%
1869	811	—
1880	672	−17.1%
1890	695	+3.4%
1900	649	−6.6%
1910	613	−5.5%
1921	582	−5.1%
1930	537	−7.7%
1950	384	−28.5%
1961	384	+0.0%
1970	352	−8.3%
1980	321	−8.8%
1991	291	−9.3%
2001	279	−4.1%
2011	271	−2.9%
2021	294	+8.5%
Source: Censuses
