= Zdelov =

- Municipality
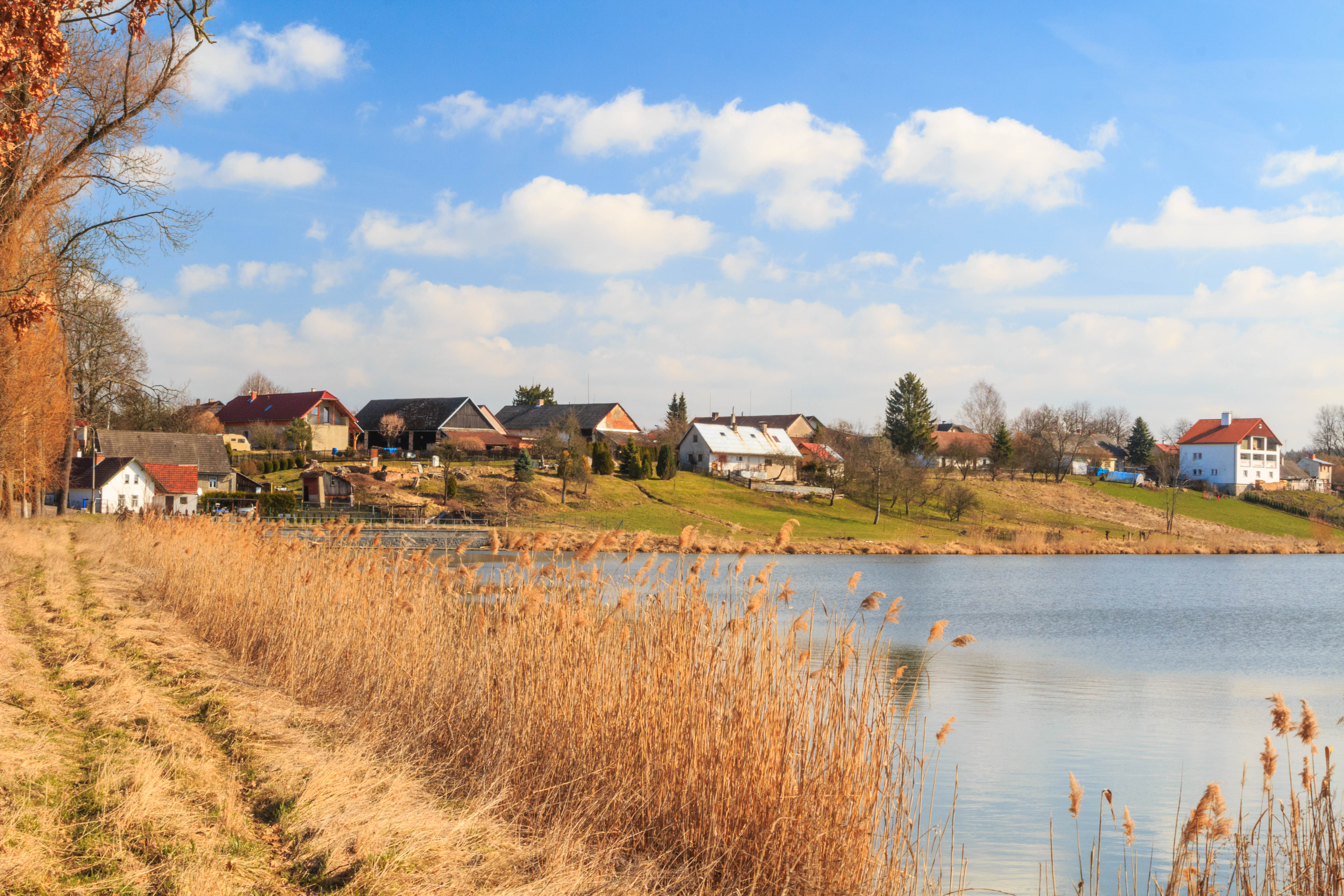
- Fishpond in Zdelov

- Flag Coat of arms

- Location in the Czech Republic
- Coordinates: 50°6′3″N 16°8′32″E
- Country: Czech Republic
- Region: Hradec Králové
- District: Rychnov nad Kněžnou
- First mentioned: 1342

Area
  - Total: 3.35 km^{2} (1.29 sq mi)
- Elevation: 292 m (958 ft)

Population (2026-01-01)
  - Total: 269
  - Density: 80.3/km^{2} (208/sq mi)
- Time zone: UTC+1 (CET)
  - Summer (DST): UTC+2 (CEST)
- Postal code: 517 21
- Website: www.zdelov.cz

Zdelov is a municipality and village in Rychnov nad Kněžnou District in the Hradec Králové Region of the Czech Republic. It has about 300 inhabitants.

== Demographics ==
Historical population
| Year | Pop. | ±% |
|---|---|---|
| 1869 | 565 | — |
| 1880 | 559 | −1.1% |
| 1890 | 577 | +3.2% |
| 1900 | 564 | −2.3% |
| 1910 | 534 | −5.3% |
| 1921 | 515 | −3.6% |
| 1930 | 488 | −5.2% |
| 1950 | 411 | −15.8% |
| 1961 | 368 | −10.5% |
| 1970 | 338 | −8.2% |
| 1980 | 274 | −18.9% |
| 1991 | 202 | −26.3% |
| 2001 | 194 | −4.0% |
| 2011 | 229 | +18.0% |
| 2021 | 255 | +11.4% |
Source: Censuses
