= Polom (Rychnov nad Kněžnou District) =

- Municipality
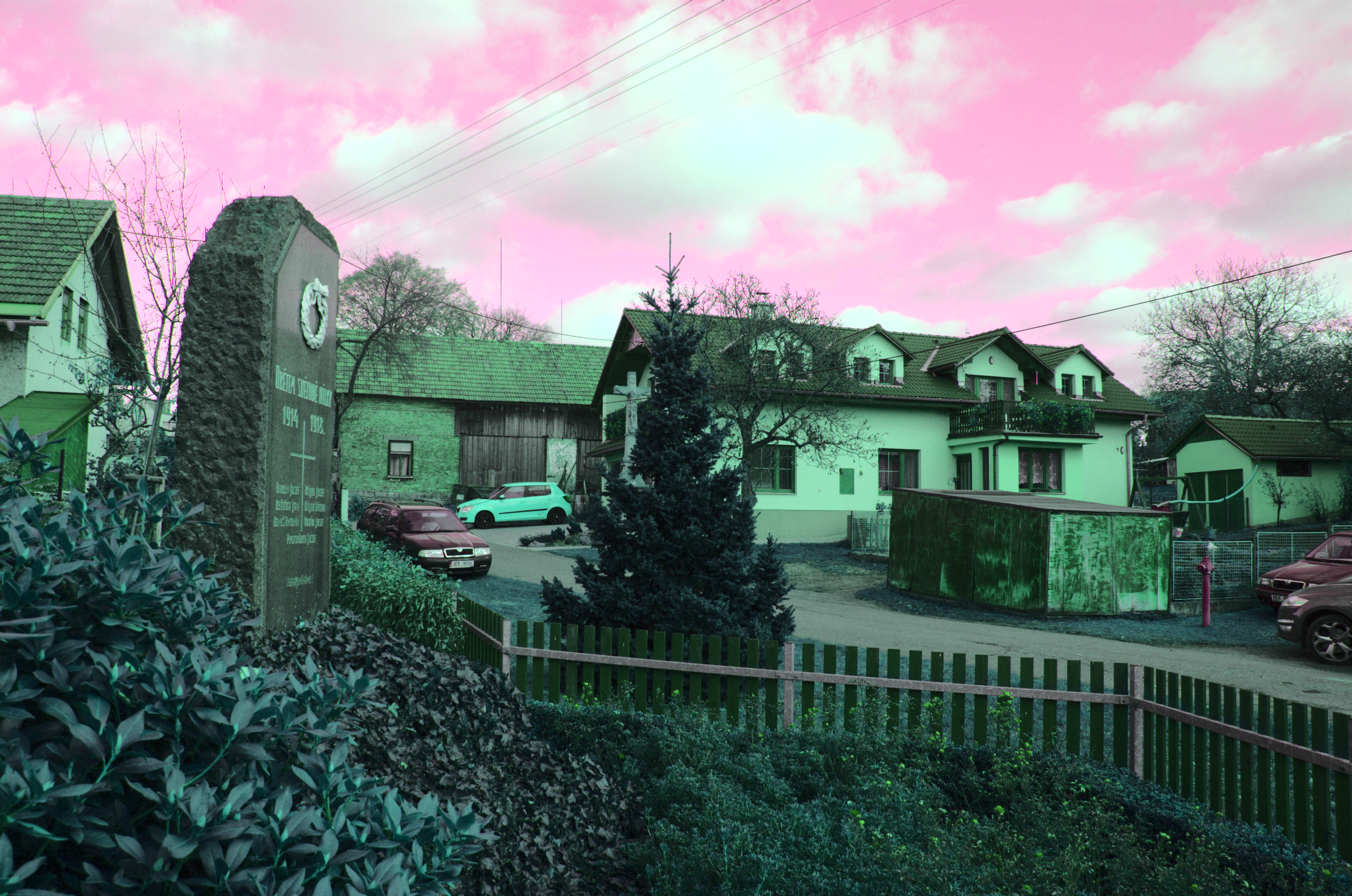
- Centre of Polom

- Coat of arms

- Location in the Czech Republic
- Coordinates: 50°3′32″N 16°18′24″E
- Country: Czech Republic
- Region: Hradec Králové
- District: Rychnov nad Kněžnou
- First mentioned: 1495

Area
  - Total: 4.68 km^{2} (1.81 sq mi)
- Elevation: 490 m (1,610 ft)

Population (2026-01-01)
  - Total: 174
  - Density: 37.2/km^{2} (96.3/sq mi)
- Time zone: UTC+1 (CET)
  - Summer (DST): UTC+2 (CEST)
- Postal code: 517 41
- Website: www.polom.cz

Polom is a municipality and village in Rychnov nad Kněžnou District in the Hradec Králové Region of the Czech Republic. It has about 200 inhabitants.

== Demographics ==
Historical population
Year	Pop.	±%
1869	398	—
1880	403	+1.3%
1890	342	−15.1%
1900	306	−10.5%
1910	280	−8.5%
1921	252	−10.0%
1930	254	+0.8%
1950	180	−29.1%
1961	200	+11.1%
1970	157	−21.5%
1980	122	−22.3%
1991	95	−22.1%
2001	113	+18.9%
2011	119	+5.3%
2021	136	+14.3%
Source: Censuses
