= Vrbice (Rychnov nad Kněžnou District) =

- Municipality
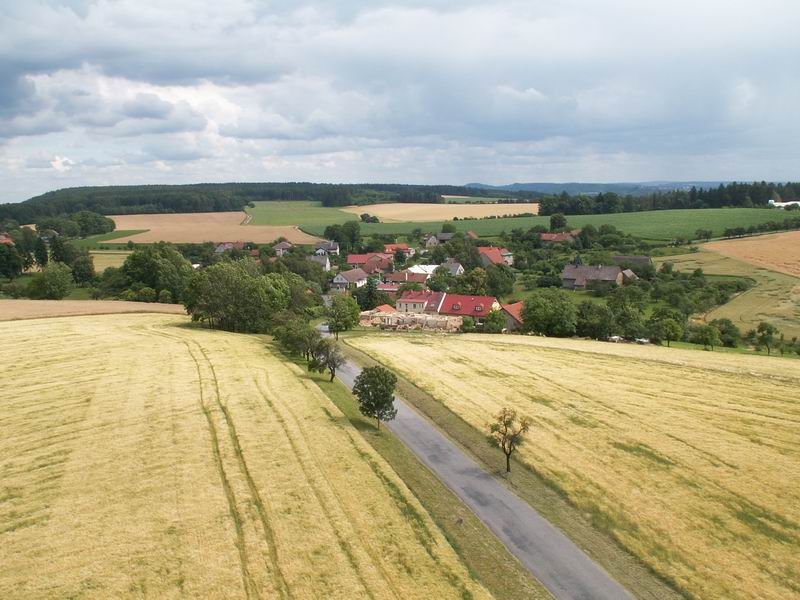
- View from the northwest

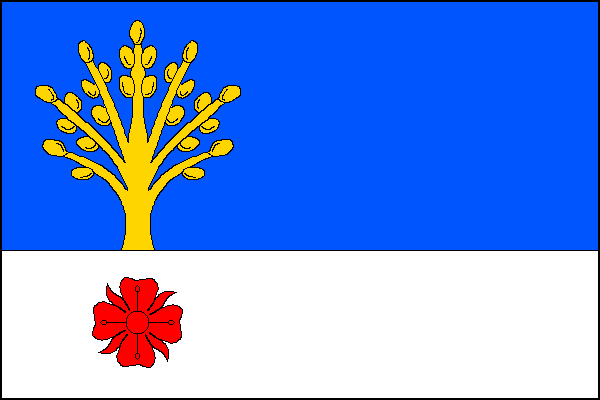
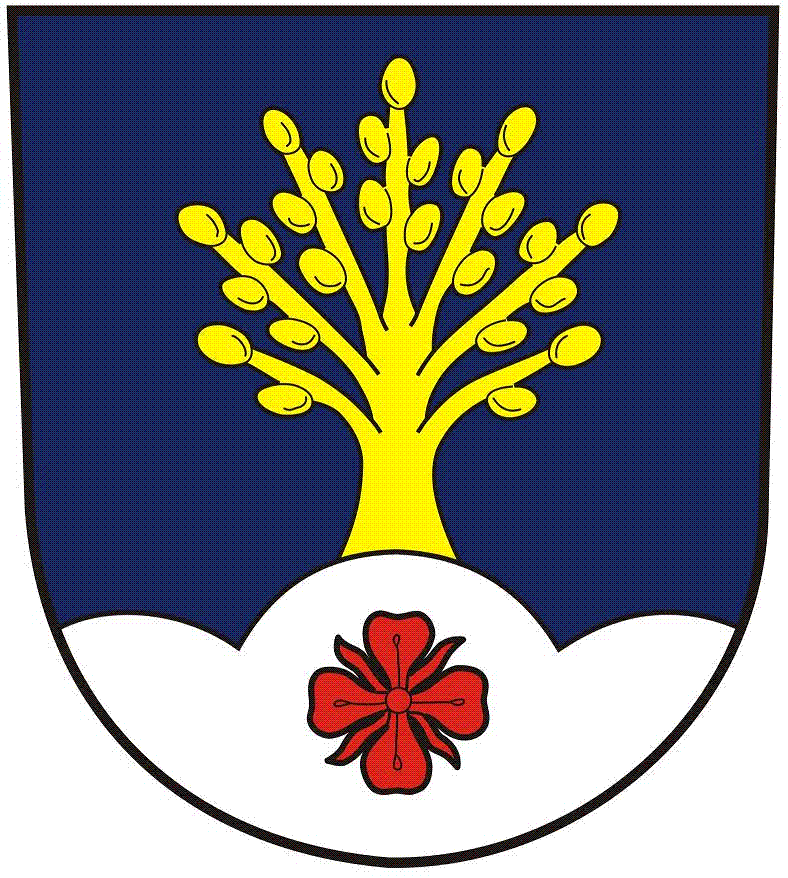
- Flag Coat of arms

- Location in the Czech Republic
- Coordinates: 50°5′21″N 16°15′6″E
- Country: Czech Republic
- Region: Hradec Králové
- District: Rychnov nad Kněžnou
- First mentioned: 1495

Area
  - Total: 2.43 km^{2} (0.94 sq mi)
- Elevation: 423 m (1,388 ft)

Population (2026-01-01)
  - Total: 158
  - Density: 65.0/km^{2} (168/sq mi)
- Time zone: UTC+1 (CET)
  - Summer (DST): UTC+2 (CEST)
- Postal code: 517 41
- Website: www.vrbice.info

Vrbice (German: Weidenbusch) is a municipality and village in Rychnov nad Kněžnou District in the Hradec Králové Region of the Czech Republic. It has about 200 inhabitants.

== Administrative division ==
Vrbice consists of two municipal parts (in brackets population according to the 2021 census):

- Vrbice (124)
- Chlínky (30)

== Demographics ==
Historical population
Year	Pop.	±%
1869	248	—
1880	258	+4.0%
1890	267	+3.5%
1900	244	−8.6%
1910	250	+2.5%
1921	262	+4.8%
1930	229	−12.6%
1950	199	−13.1%
1961	195	−2.0%
1970	160	−17.9%
1980	133	−16.9%
1991	123	−7.5%
2001	130	+5.7%
2011	133	+2.3%
2021	154	+15.8%
Source: Censuses
