= Byzhradec =

- Municipality
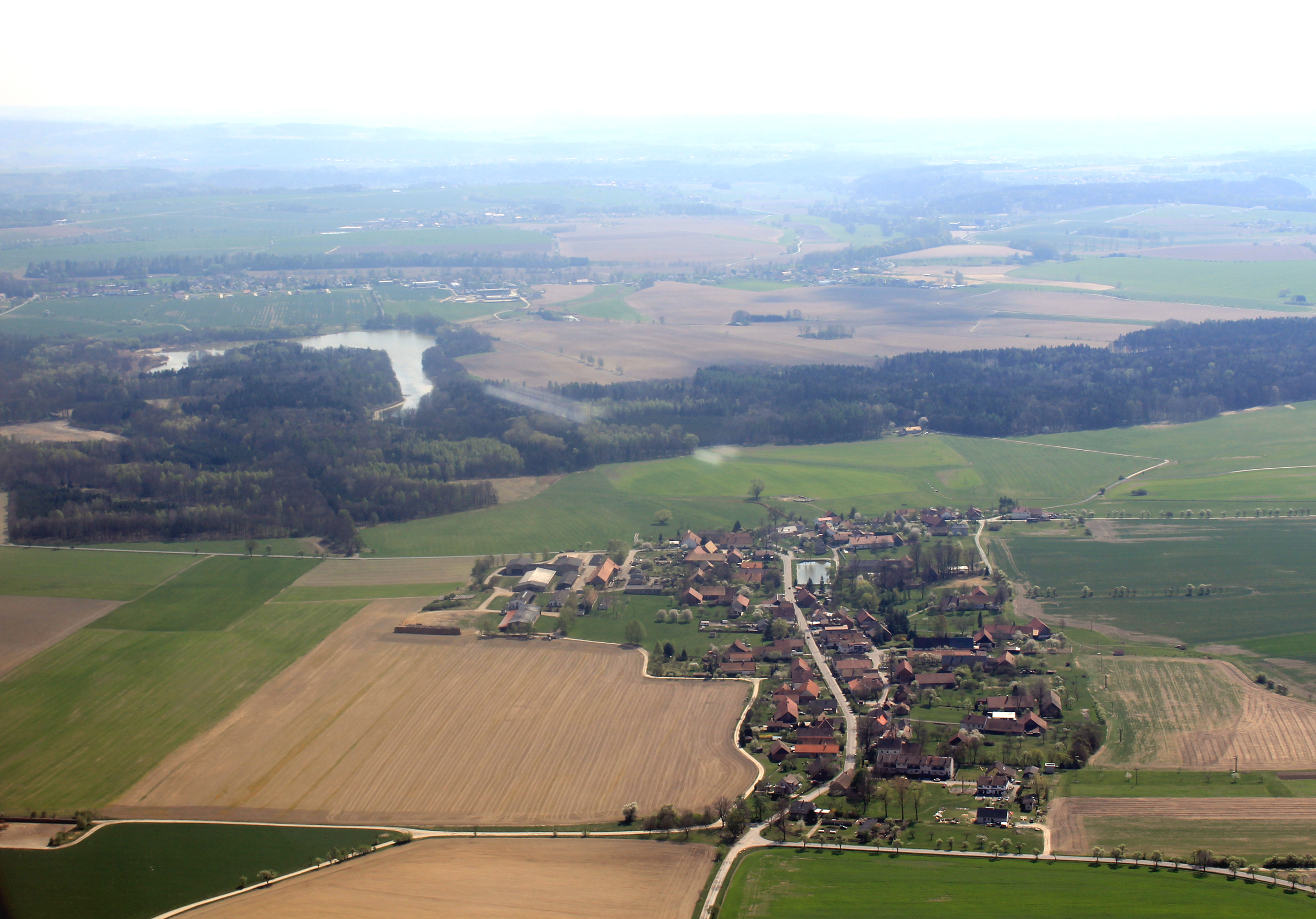
- Aerial view

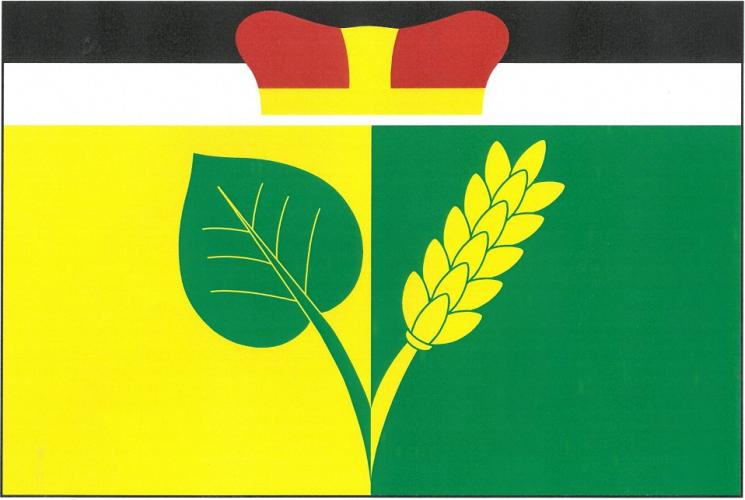
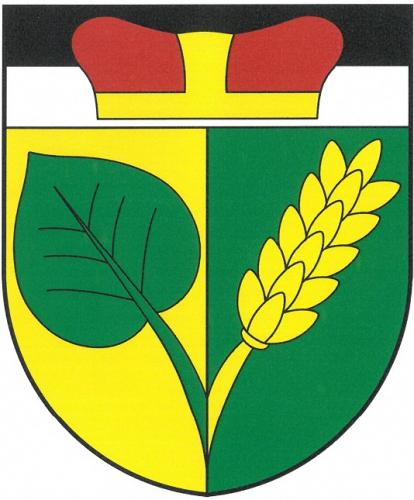
- Flag Coat of arms

- Location in the Czech Republic
- Coordinates: 50°12′57″N 16°11′25″E
- Country: Czech Republic
- Region: Hradec Králové
- District: Rychnov nad Kněžnou
- First mentioned: 1544

Area
  - Total: 5.31 km^{2} (2.05 sq mi)
- Elevation: 313 m (1,027 ft)

Population (2026-01-01)
  - Total: 207
  - Density: 39.0/km^{2} (101/sq mi)
- Time zone: UTC+1 (CET)
  - Summer (DST): UTC+2 (CEST)
- Postal code: 518 01
- Website: www.byzhradec.cz

Byzhradec is a municipality and village in Rychnov nad Kněžnou District in the Hradec Králové Region of the Czech Republic. It has about 200 inhabitants.

== Demographics ==
Historical population
| Year | Pop. | ±% |
|---|---|---|
| 1869 | 406 | — |
| 1880 | 440 | +8.4% |
| 1890 | 404 | −8.2% |
| 1900 | 396 | −2.0% |
| 1910 | 339 | −14.4% |
| 1921 | 370 | +9.1% |
| 1930 | 335 | −9.5% |
| 1950 | 258 | −23.0% |
| 1961 | 260 | +0.8% |
| 1970 | 242 | −6.9% |
| 1980 | 228 | −5.8% |
| 1991 | 241 | +5.7% |
| 2001 | 224 | −7.1% |
| 2011 | 196 | −12.5% |
| 2021 | 220 | +12.2% |
Source: Censuses
