= Třebešov =

- Municipality
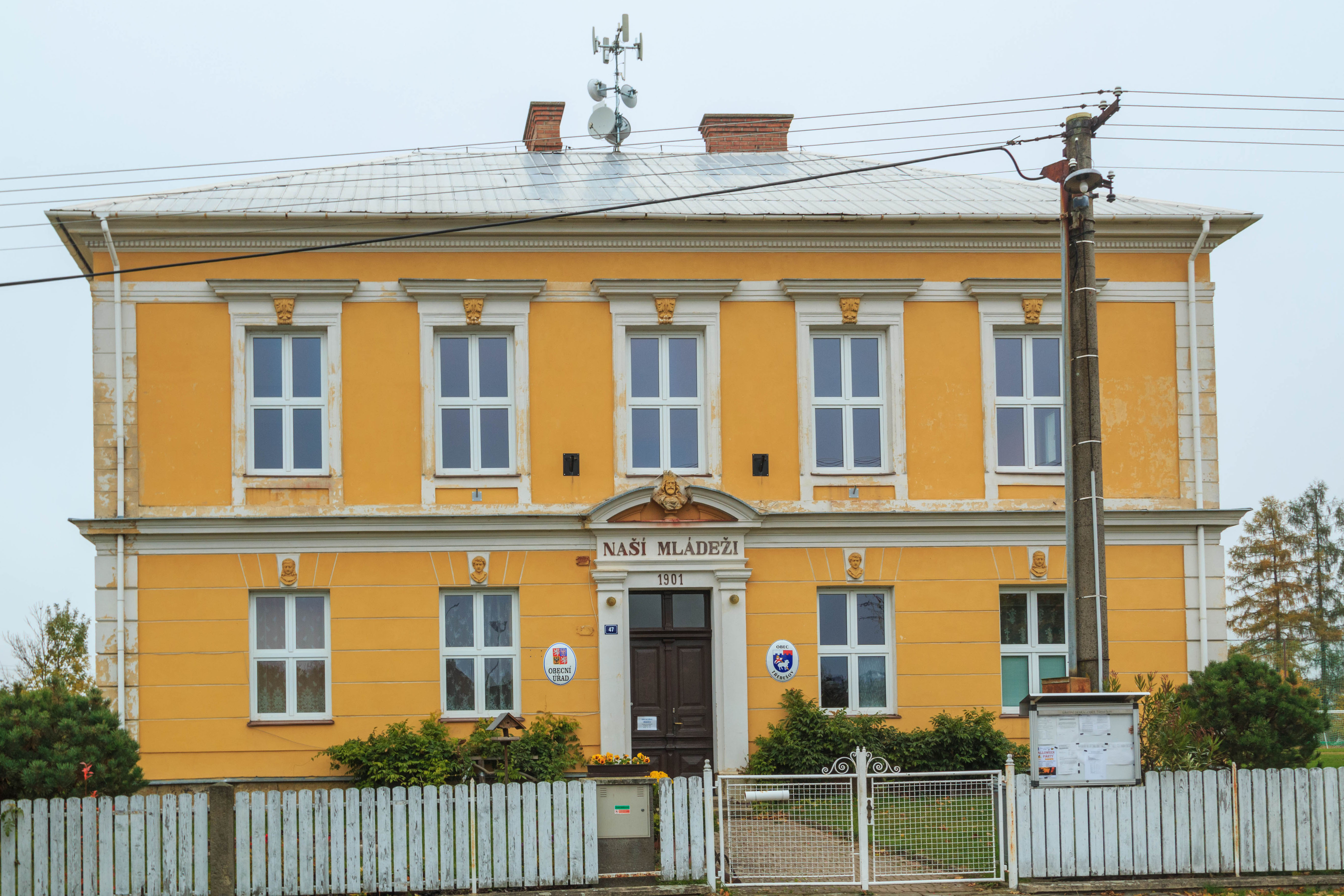
- Municipal office

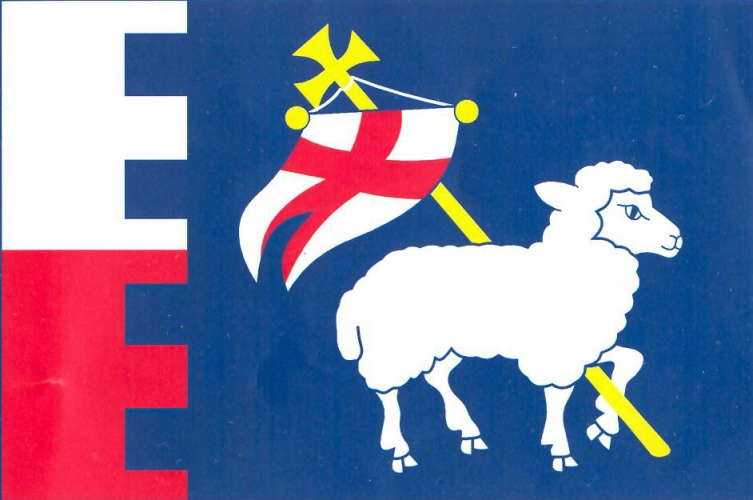
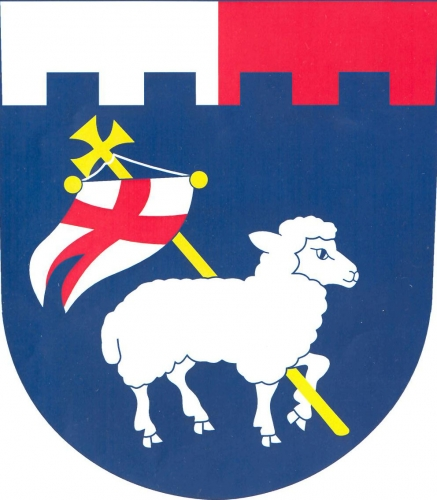
- Flag Coat of arms

- Location in the Czech Republic
- Coordinates: 50°10′6″N 16°12′15″E
- Country: Czech Republic
- Region: Hradec Králové
- District: Rychnov nad Kněžnou
- First mentioned: 1360

Area
  - Total: 3.13 km^{2} (1.21 sq mi)
- Elevation: 304 m (997 ft)

Population (2026-01-01)
  - Total: 326
  - Density: 104/km^{2} (270/sq mi)
- Time zone: UTC+1 (CET)
  - Summer (DST): UTC+2 (CEST)
- Postal code: 516 01
- Website: trebesov.cz

Třebešov is a municipality and village in Rychnov nad Kněžnou District in the Hradec Králové Region of the Czech Republic. It has about 300 inhabitants.

== Demographics ==
Historical population
Year	Pop.	±%
1869	276	—
1880	317	+14.9%
1890	363	+14.5%
1900	326	−10.2%
1910	353	+8.3%
1921	336	−4.8%
1930	314	−6.5%
1950	268	−14.6%
1961	312	+16.4%
1970	259	−17.0%
1980	231	−10.8%
1991	252	+9.1%
2001	236	−6.3%
2011	268	+13.6%
2021	289	+7.8%
Source: Censuses
