= Tutleky =

- Municipality
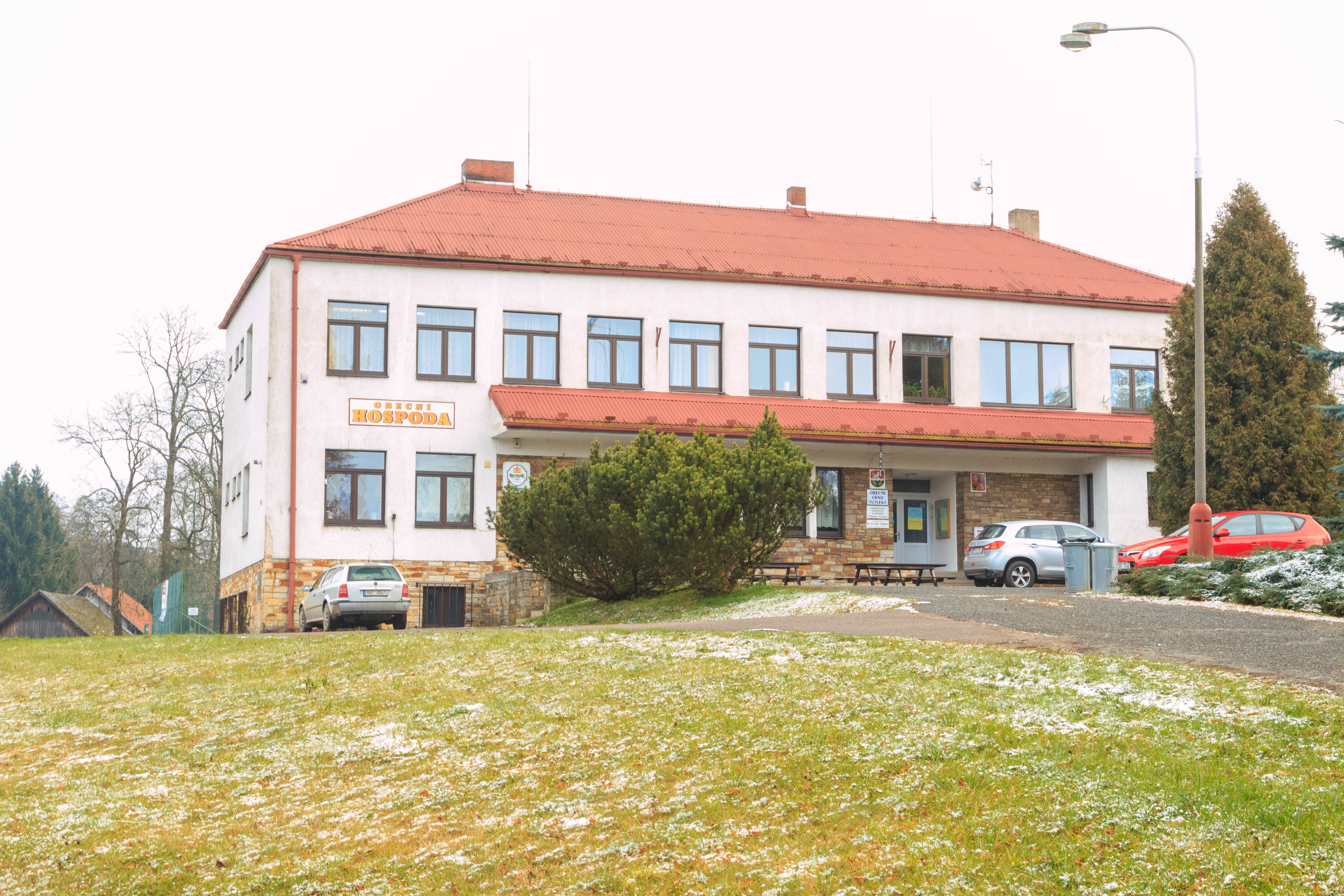
- Municipal office

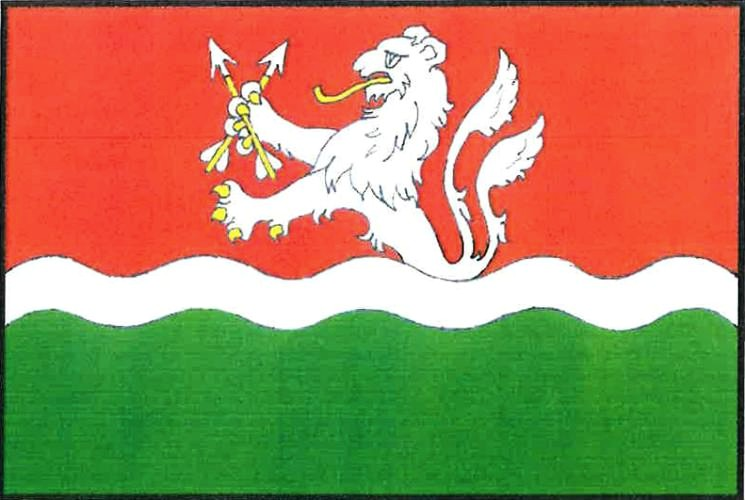
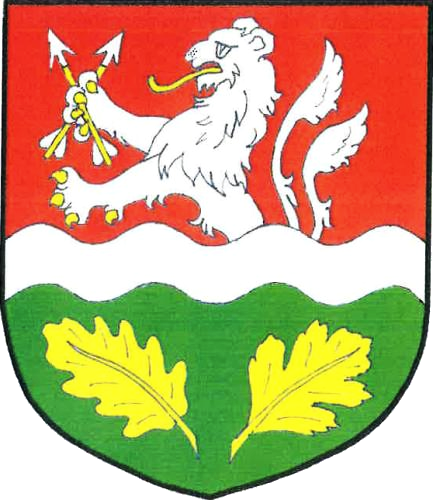
- Flag Coat of arms

- Location in the Czech Republic
- Coordinates: 50°8′2″N 16°14′29″E
- Country: Czech Republic
- Region: Hradec Králové
- District: Rychnov nad Kněžnou
- First mentioned: 1358

Area
  - Total: 5.58 km^{2} (2.15 sq mi)
- Elevation: 307 m (1,007 ft)

Population (2026-01-01)
  - Total: 338
  - Density: 60.6/km^{2} (157/sq mi)
- Time zone: UTC+1 (CET)
  - Summer (DST): UTC+2 (CEST)
- Postal code: 517 41
- Website: www.tutleky.cz

Tutleky is a municipality and village in Rychnov nad Kněžnou District in the Hradec Králové Region of the Czech Republic. It has about 300 inhabitants.

== Administrative division ==
Tutleky consists of two municipal parts (in brackets population according to the 2021 census):

- Tutleky (285)
- Dubí (63)

== Demographics ==
Historical population
| Year | Pop. | ±% |
|---|---|---|
| 1869 | 536 | — |
| 1880 | 521 | −2.8% |
| 1890 | 525 | +0.8% |
| 1900 | 533 | +1.5% |
| 1910 | 556 | +4.3% |
| 1921 | 536 | −3.6% |
| 1930 | 494 | −7.8% |
| 1950 | 366 | −25.9% |
| 1961 | 398 | +8.7% |
| 1970 | 363 | −8.8% |
| 1980 | 328 | −9.6% |
| 1991 | 335 | +2.1% |
| 2001 | 322 | −3.9% |
| 2011 | 346 | +7.5% |
| 2021 | 348 | +0.6% |
Source: Censuses
