= Trnov =

- Municipality
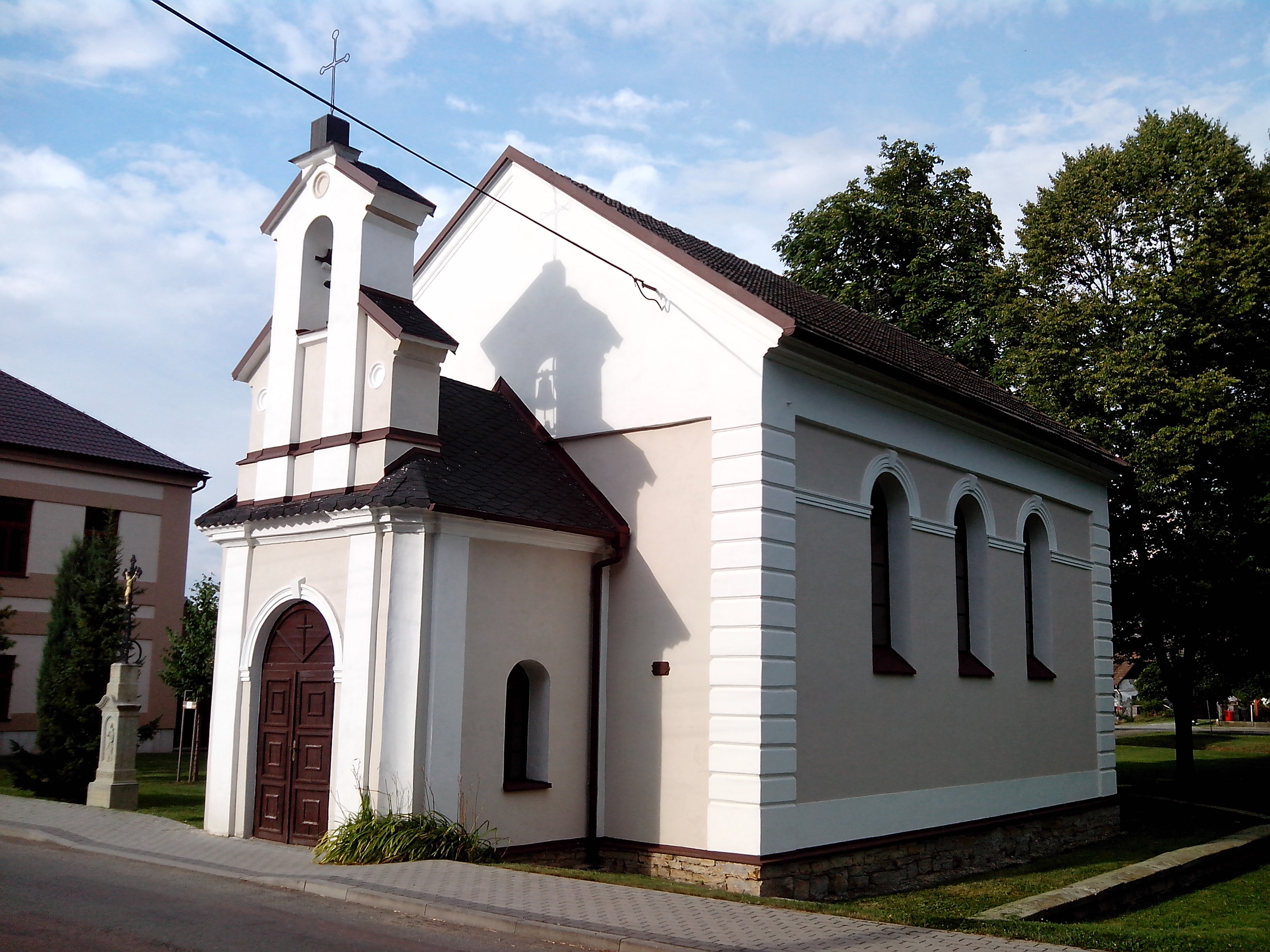
- Chapel of Saint John

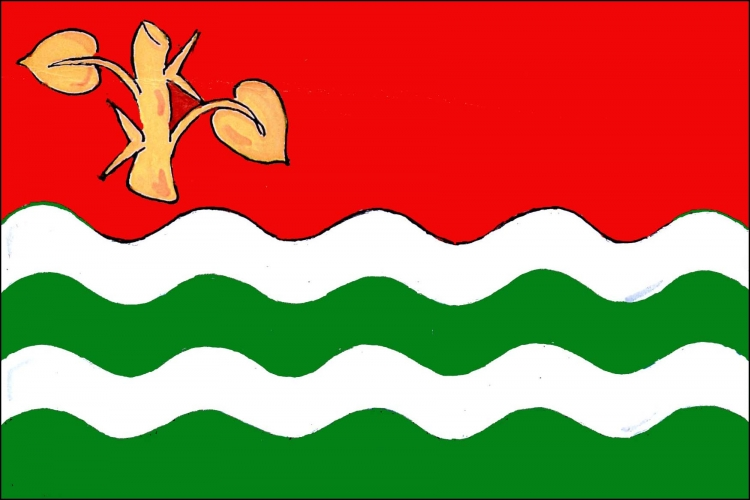
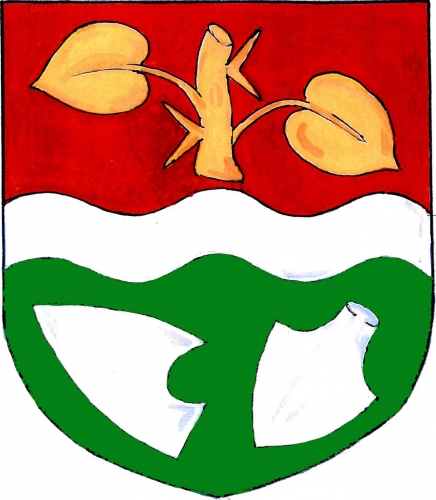
- Flag Coat of arms

- Location in the Czech Republic
- Coordinates: 50°14′41″N 16°9′52″E
- Country: Czech Republic
- Region: Hradec Králové
- District: Rychnov nad Kněžnou
- First mentioned: 1388

Area
  - Total: 14.79 km^{2} (5.71 sq mi)
- Elevation: 292 m (958 ft)

Population (2026-01-01)
  - Total: 779
  - Density: 52.7/km^{2} (136/sq mi)
- Time zone: UTC+1 (CET)
  - Summer (DST): UTC+2 (CEST)
- Postal codes: 517 32, 517 33, 518 01
- Website: trnov.cz

Trnov is a municipality and village in Rychnov nad Kněžnou District in the Hradec Králové Region of the Czech Republic. It has about 800 inhabitants.

== Administrative division ==
Trnov consists of four municipal parts (in brackets population according to the 2021 census):

- Trnov (242)
- Houdkovice (272)
- Zádolí (57)
- Záhornice (165)

== Demographics ==
Historical population
Year	Pop.	±%
1869	1,300	—
1880	1,437	+10.5%
1890	1,292	−10.1%
1900	1,343	+3.9%
1910	1,293	−3.7%
1921	1,263	−2.3%
1930	1,176	−6.9%
1950	893	−24.1%
1961	866	−3.0%
1970	781	−9.8%
1980	688	−11.9%
1991	678	−1.5%
2001	640	−5.6%
2011	705	+10.2%
2021	736	+4.4%
Source: Censuses
