= Očelice =

- Municipality
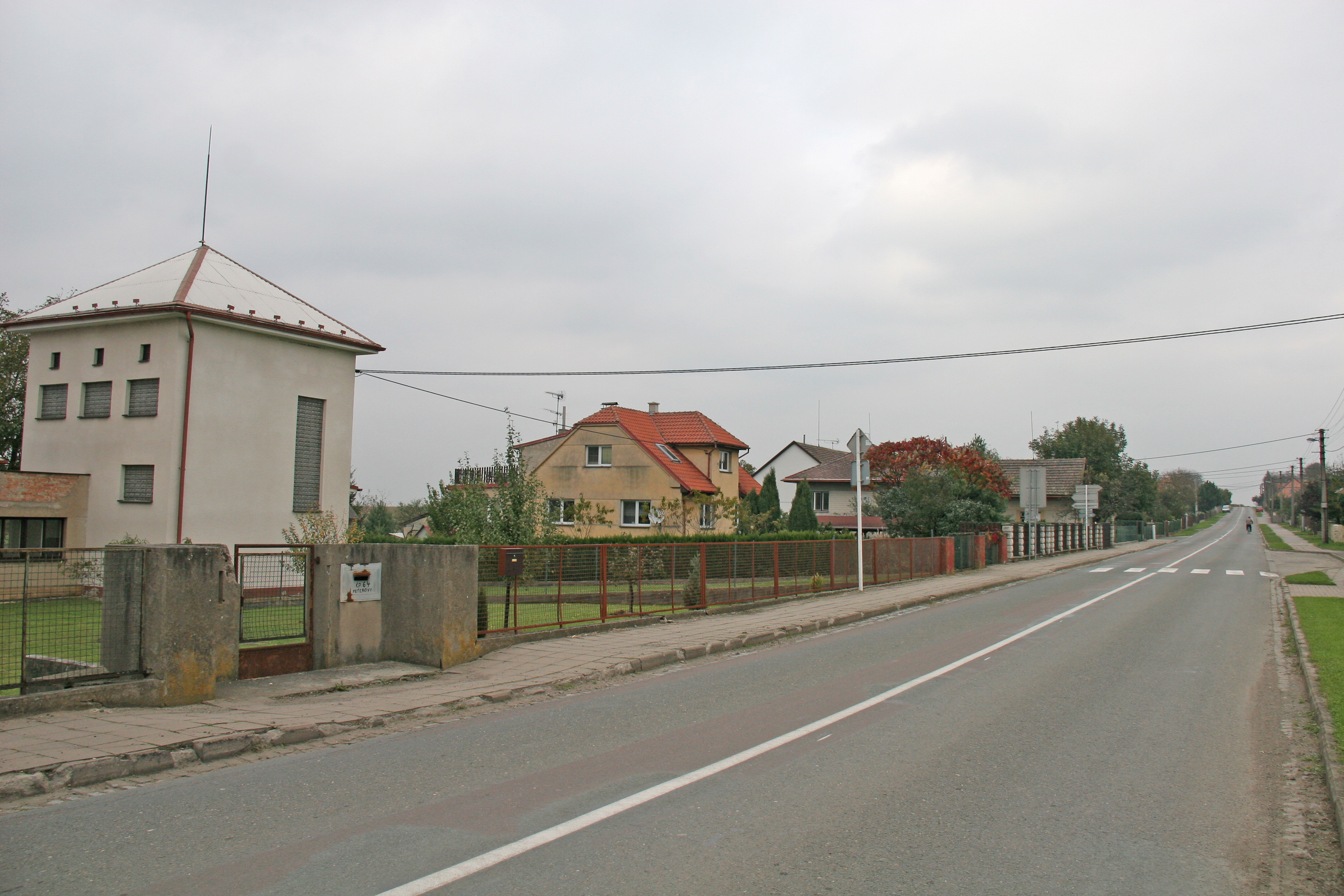
- Main road

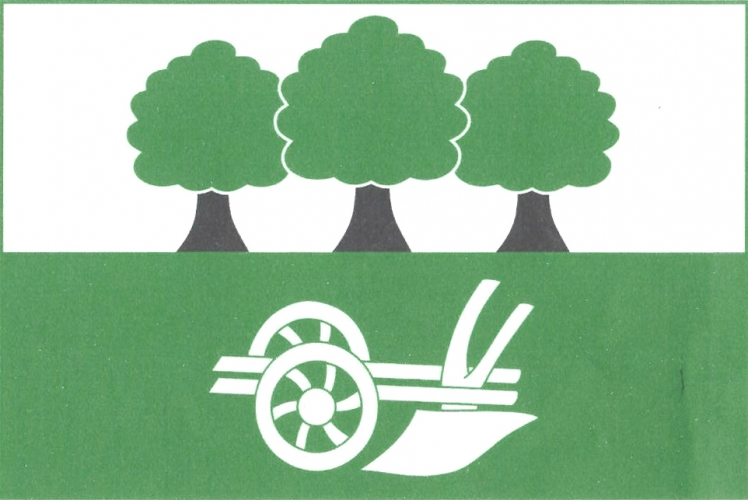
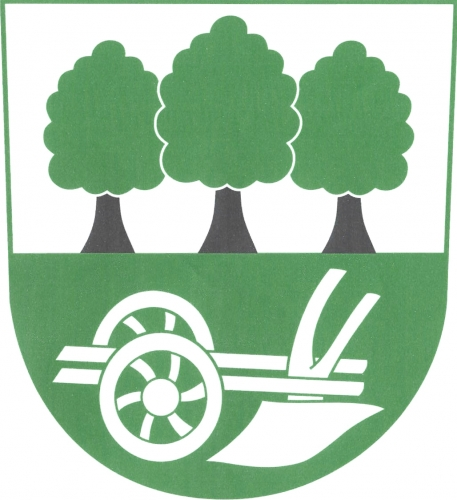
- Flag Coat of arms

- Location in the Czech Republic
- Coordinates: 50°14′24″N 16°4′3″E
- Country: Czech Republic
- Region: Hradec Králové
- District: Rychnov nad Kněžnou
- First mentioned: 1378

Area
  - Total: 5.65 km^{2} (2.18 sq mi)
- Elevation: 274 m (899 ft)

Population (2026-01-01)
  - Total: 225
  - Density: 39.8/km^{2} (103/sq mi)
- Time zone: UTC+1 (CET)
  - Summer (DST): UTC+2 (CEST)
- Postal code: 517 71
- Website: ocelice.trebechovicko.cz

Očelice is a municipality and village in Rychnov nad Kněžnou District in the Hradec Králové Region of the Czech Republic. It has about 200 inhabitants.

== Administrative division ==
Očelice consists of two municipal parts (in brackets population according to the 2021 census):

- Očelice (179)
- Městec (38)

== Demographics ==
Historical population
Year	Pop.	±%
1869	422	—
1880	495	+17.3%
1890	508	+2.6%
1900	466	−8.3%
1910	454	−2.6%
1921	469	+3.3%
1930	417	−11.1%
1950	327	−21.6%
1961	349	+6.7%
1970	299	−14.3%
1980	261	−12.7%
1991	261	+0.0%
2001	236	−9.6%
2011	252	+6.8%
2021	217	−13.9%
Source: Censuses
