= Ohnišov =

- Municipality
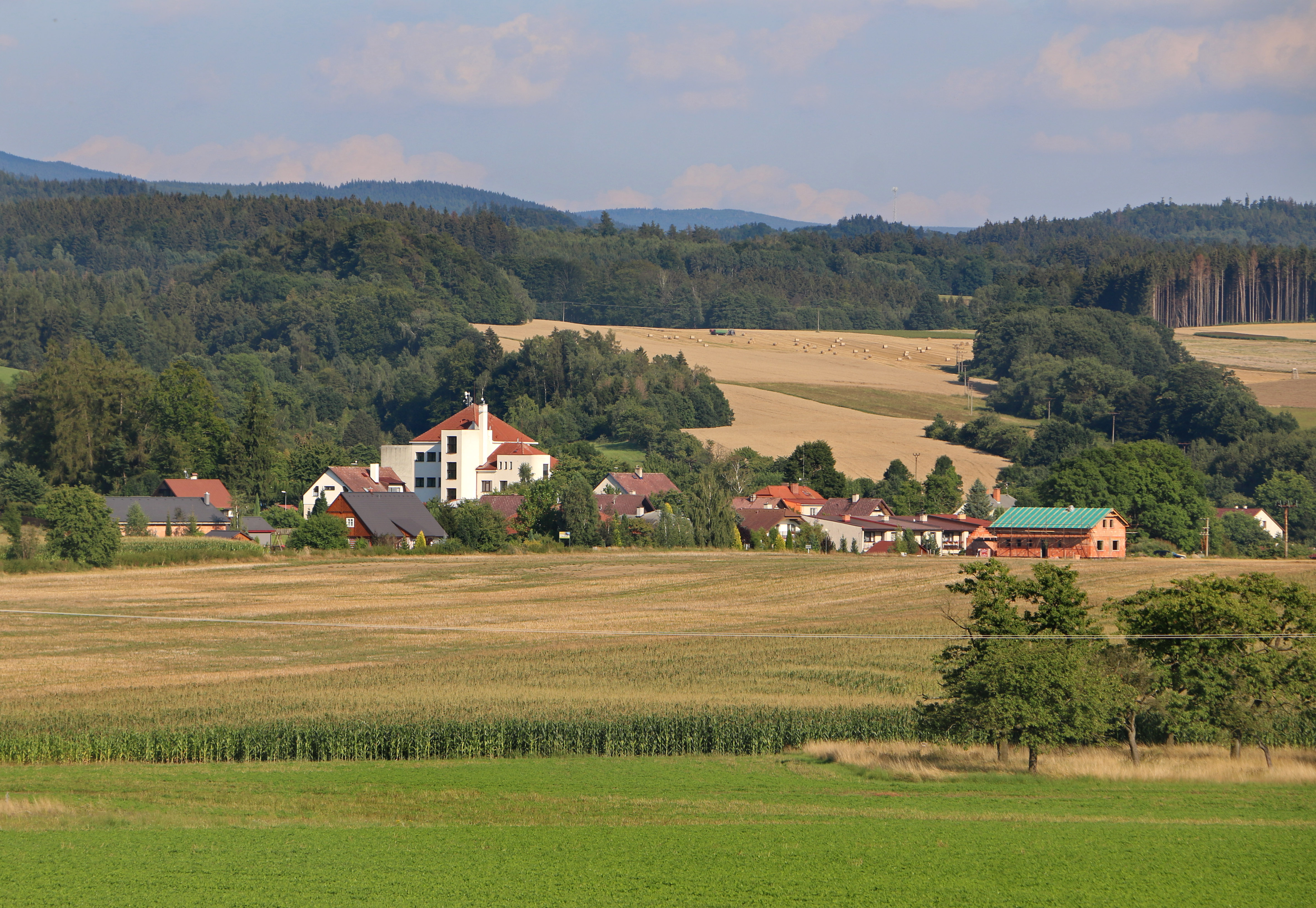
- View from the west

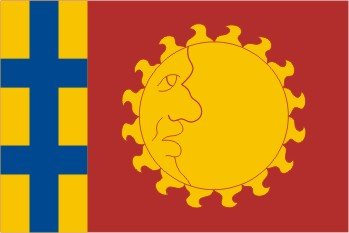
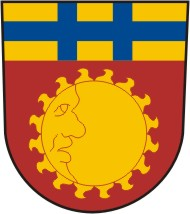
- Flag Coat of arms

- Location in the Czech Republic
- Coordinates: 50°19′21″N 16°12′50″E
- Country: Czech Republic
- Region: Hradec Králové
- District: Rychnov nad Kněžnou
- First mentioned: 1471

Area
  - Total: 10.50 km^{2} (4.05 sq mi)
- Elevation: 406 m (1,332 ft)

Population (2026-01-01)
  - Total: 511
  - Density: 48.7/km^{2} (126/sq mi)
- Time zone: UTC+1 (CET)
  - Summer (DST): UTC+2 (CEST)
- Postal code: 517 84
- Website: www.ohnisov.cz

Ohnišov is a municipality and village in Rychnov nad Kněžnou District in the Hradec Králové Region of the Czech Republic. It has about 500 inhabitants.

== Administrative division ==
Ohnišov consists of two municipal parts (in brackets population according to the 2021 census):

- Ohnišov (471)
- Zákraví (45)

== Demographics ==
Historical population
| Year | Pop. | ±% |
|---|---|---|
| 1869 | 1,034 | — |
| 1880 | 1,062 | +2.7% |
| 1890 | 1,071 | +0.8% |
| 1900 | 1,135 | +6.0% |
| 1910 | 978 | −13.8% |
| 1921 | 891 | −8.9% |
| 1930 | 827 | −7.2% |
| 1950 | 616 | −25.5% |
| 1961 | 578 | −6.2% |
| 1970 | 563 | −2.6% |
| 1980 | 498 | −11.5% |
| 1991 | 499 | +0.2% |
| 2001 | 478 | −4.2% |
| 2011 | 484 | +1.3% |
| 2021 | 516 | +6.6% |
Source: Censuses
