= Chlístov (Rychnov nad Kněžnou District) =

- Municipality
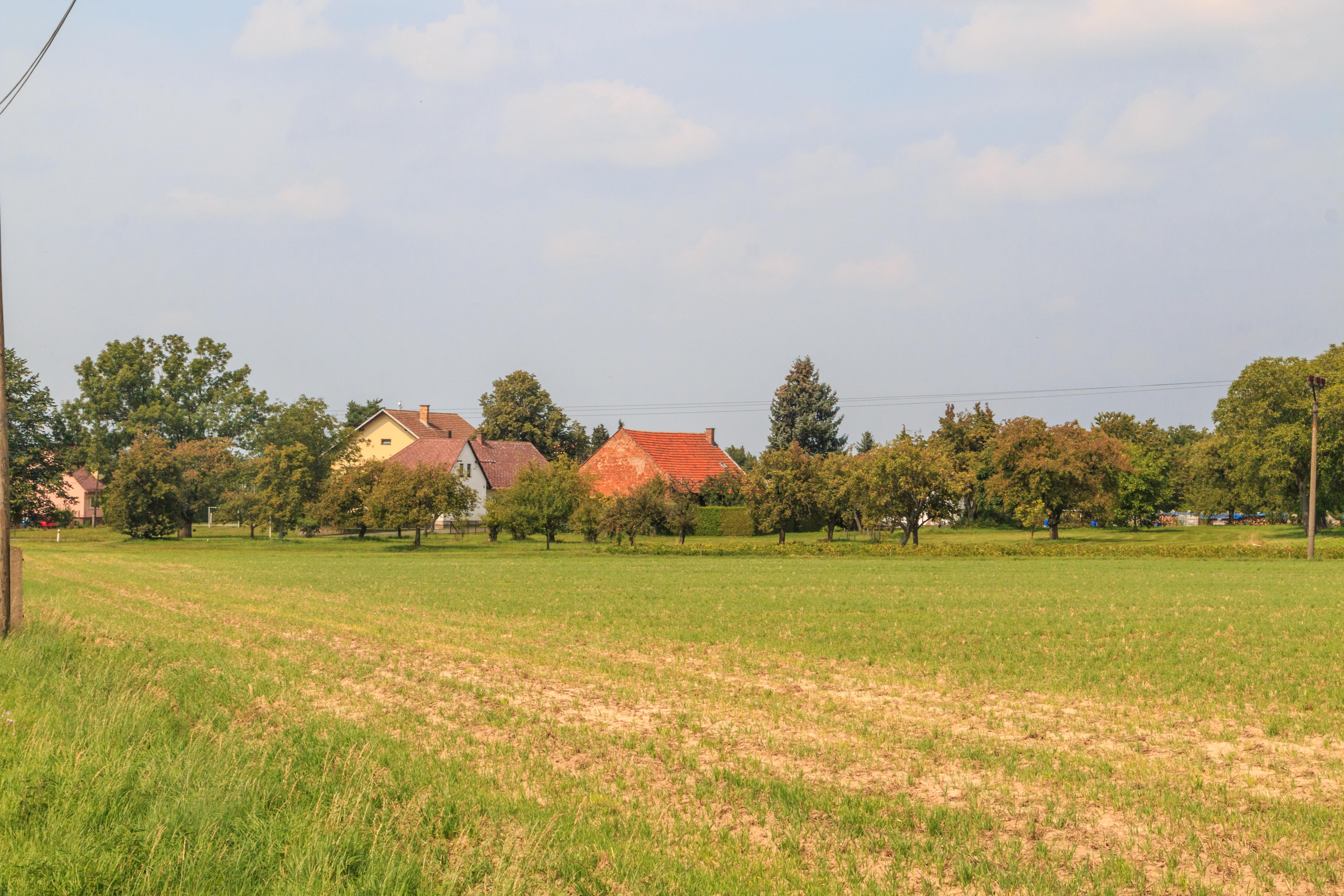
- View from the south

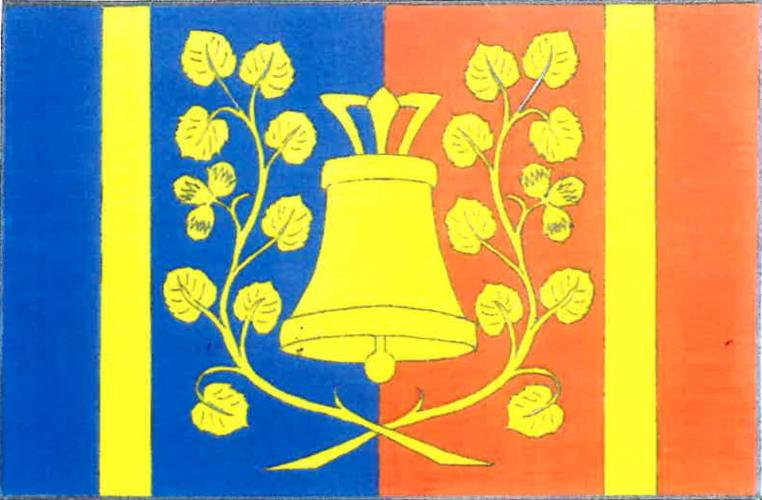
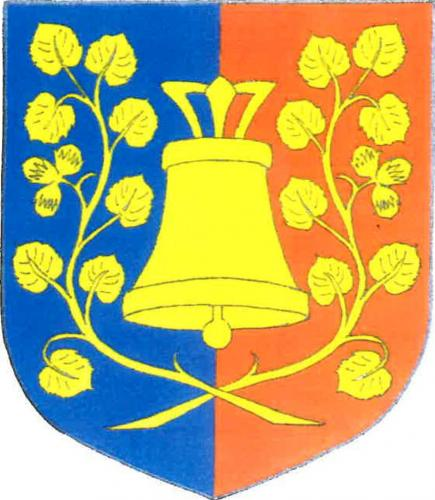
- Flag Coat of arms

- Location in the Czech Republic
- Coordinates: 50°19′21″N 16°10′10″E
- Country: Czech Republic
- Region: Hradec Králové
- District: Rychnov nad Kněžnou
- First mentioned: 1545

Area
  - Total: 1.39 km^{2} (0.54 sq mi)
- Elevation: 354 m (1,161 ft)

Population (2026-01-01)
  - Total: 78
  - Density: 56/km^{2} (150/sq mi)
- Time zone: UTC+1 (CET)
  - Summer (DST): UTC+2 (CEST)
- Postal code: 518 01
- Website: www.obec-chlistov.cz

Chlístov is a municipality and village in Rychnov nad Kněžnou District in the Hradec Králové Region of the Czech Republic. It has about 80 inhabitants.

== Demographics ==
Historical population
Year	Pop.	±%
1869	153	—
1880	135	−11.8%
1890	136	+0.7%
1900	139	+2.2%
1910	125	−10.1%
1921	129	+3.2%
1930	125	−3.1%
1950	100	−20.0%
1961	110	+10.0%
1970	100	−9.1%
1980	87	−13.0%
1991	111	+27.6%
2001	95	−14.4%
2011	84	−11.6%
2021	77	−8.3%
Source: Censuses
