= Olešnice (Rychnov nad Kněžnou District) =

- Municipality
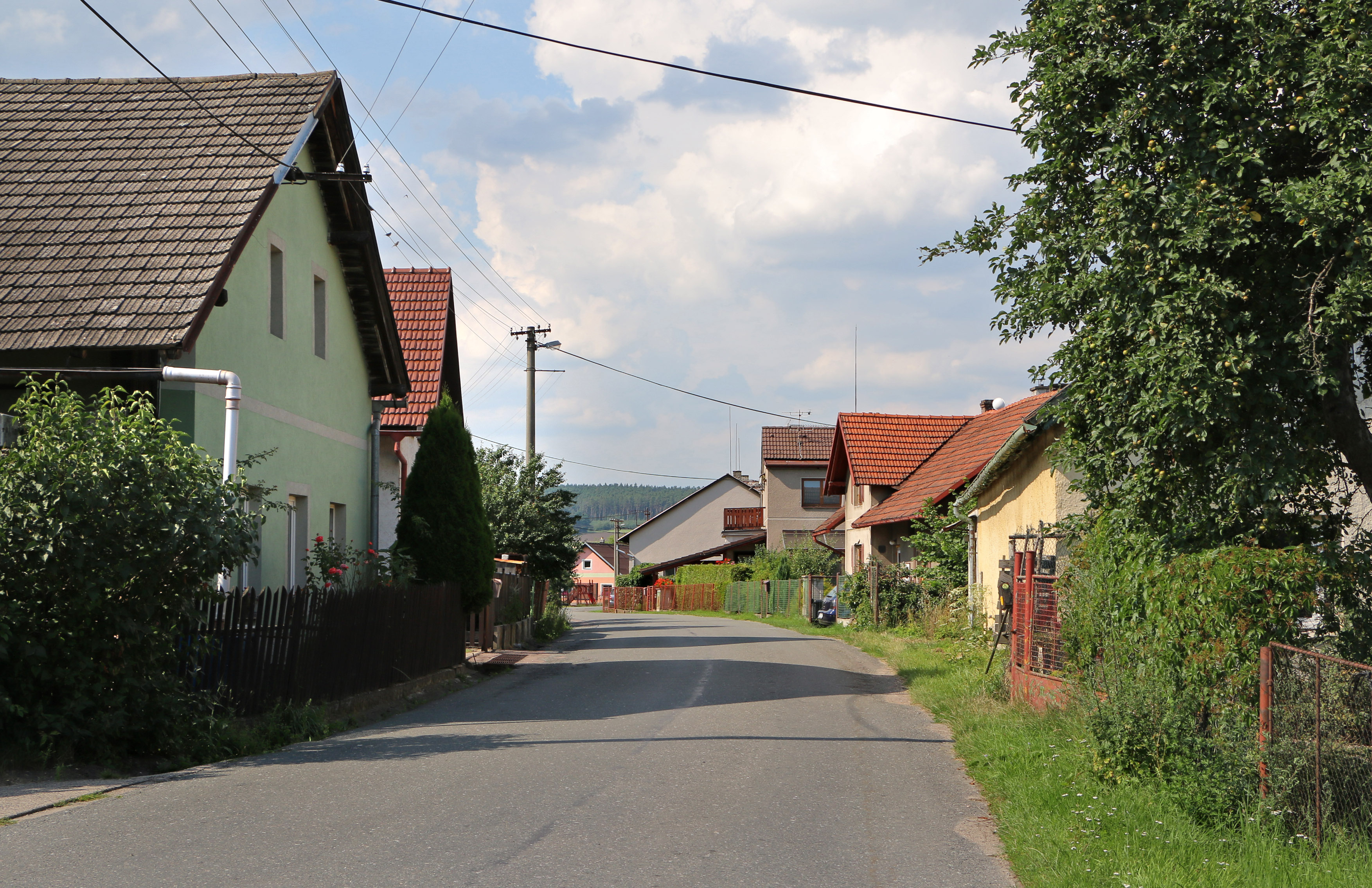
- Main street

- Location in the Czech Republic
- Coordinates: 50°8′39″N 16°8′55″E
- Country: Czech Republic
- Region: Hradec Králové
- District: Rychnov nad Kněžnou
- First mentioned: 1407

Area
  - Total: 7.80 km^{2} (3.01 sq mi)
- Elevation: 277 m (909 ft)

Population (2026-01-01)
  - Total: 486
  - Density: 62.3/km^{2} (161/sq mi)
- Time zone: UTC+1 (CET)
  - Summer (DST): UTC+2 (CEST)
- Postal code: 517 36
- Website: www.obecolesnice.cz

Olešnice is a municipality and village in Rychnov nad Kněžnou District in the Hradec Králové Region of the Czech Republic. It has about 500 inhabitants.

== Administrative division ==
Olešnice consists of two municipal parts (in brackets population according to the 2021 census):

- Olešnice (381)
- Hoděčín (89)

== Demographics ==
Historical population
Year	Pop.	±%
1869	837	—
1880	864	+3.2%
1890	822	−4.9%
1900	780	−5.1%
1910	748	−4.1%
1921	752	+0.5%
1930	758	+0.8%
1950	565	−25.5%
1961	595	+5.3%
1970	534	−10.3%
1980	472	−11.6%
1991	409	−13.3%
2001	417	+2.0%
2011	451	+8.2%
2021	470	+4.2%
Source: Censuses
