= Svídnice (Rychnov nad Kněžnou District) =

- Municipality
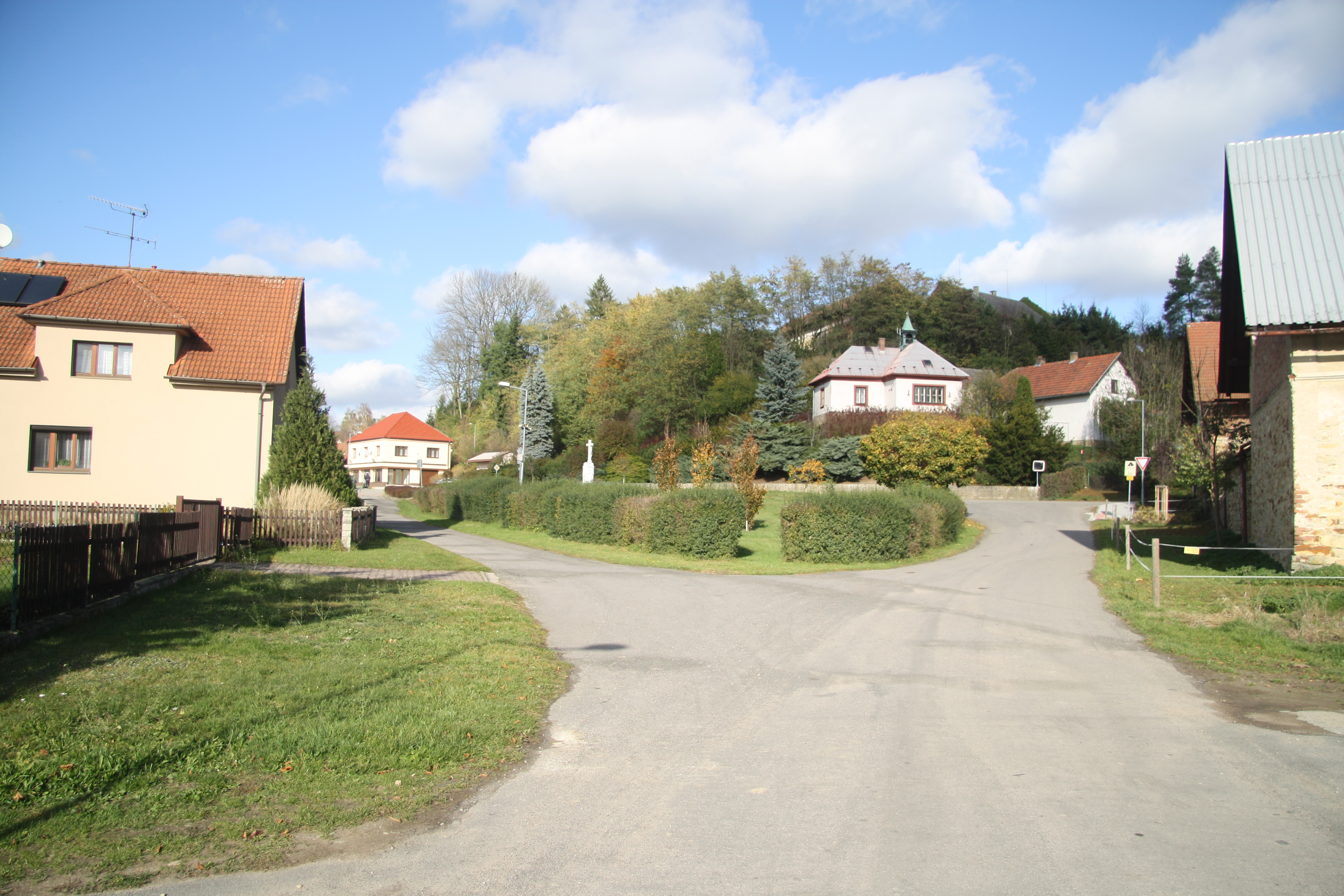
- Centre of Svídnice

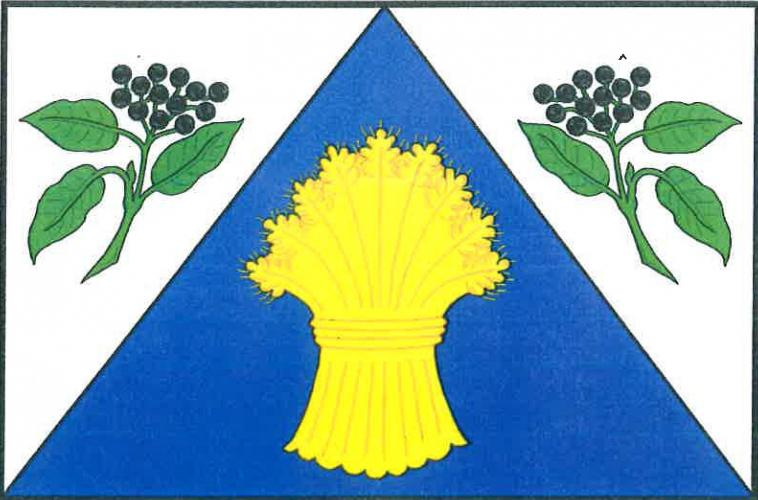
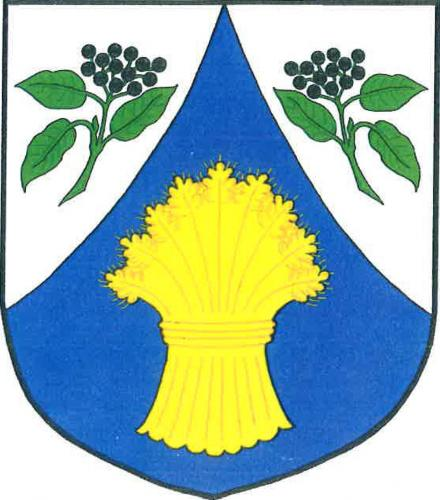
- Flag Coat of arms

- Location in the Czech Republic
- Coordinates: 50°5′10″N 16°13′24″E
- Country: Czech Republic
- Region: Hradec Králové
- District: Rychnov nad Kněžnou
- First mentioned: 1342

Area
  - Total: 4.62 km^{2} (1.78 sq mi)
- Elevation: 314 m (1,030 ft)

Population (2026-01-01)
  - Total: 168
  - Density: 36.4/km^{2} (94.2/sq mi)
- Time zone: UTC+1 (CET)
  - Summer (DST): UTC+2 (CEST)
- Postal code: 517 41
- Website: www.svidnice.cz

Svídnice is a municipality and village in Rychnov nad Kněžnou District in the Hradec Králové Region of the Czech Republic. It has about 200 inhabitants.

== Administrative division ==
Svídnice consists of two municipal parts (in brackets population according to the 2021 census):

- Svídnice (123)
- Suchá Rybná (42)

== Demographics ==
Historical population
Year	Pop.	±%
1869	475	—
1880	483	+1.7%
1890	480	−0.6%
1900	438	−8.8%
1910	407	−7.1%
1921	417	+2.5%
1930	385	−7.7%
1950	278	−27.8%
1961	265	−4.7%
1970	258	−2.6%
1980	235	−8.9%
1991	170	−27.7%
2001	182	+7.1%
2011	161	−11.5%
2021	165	+2.5%
Source: Censuses
