= Krchleby (Rychnov nad Kněžnou District) =

- Municipality
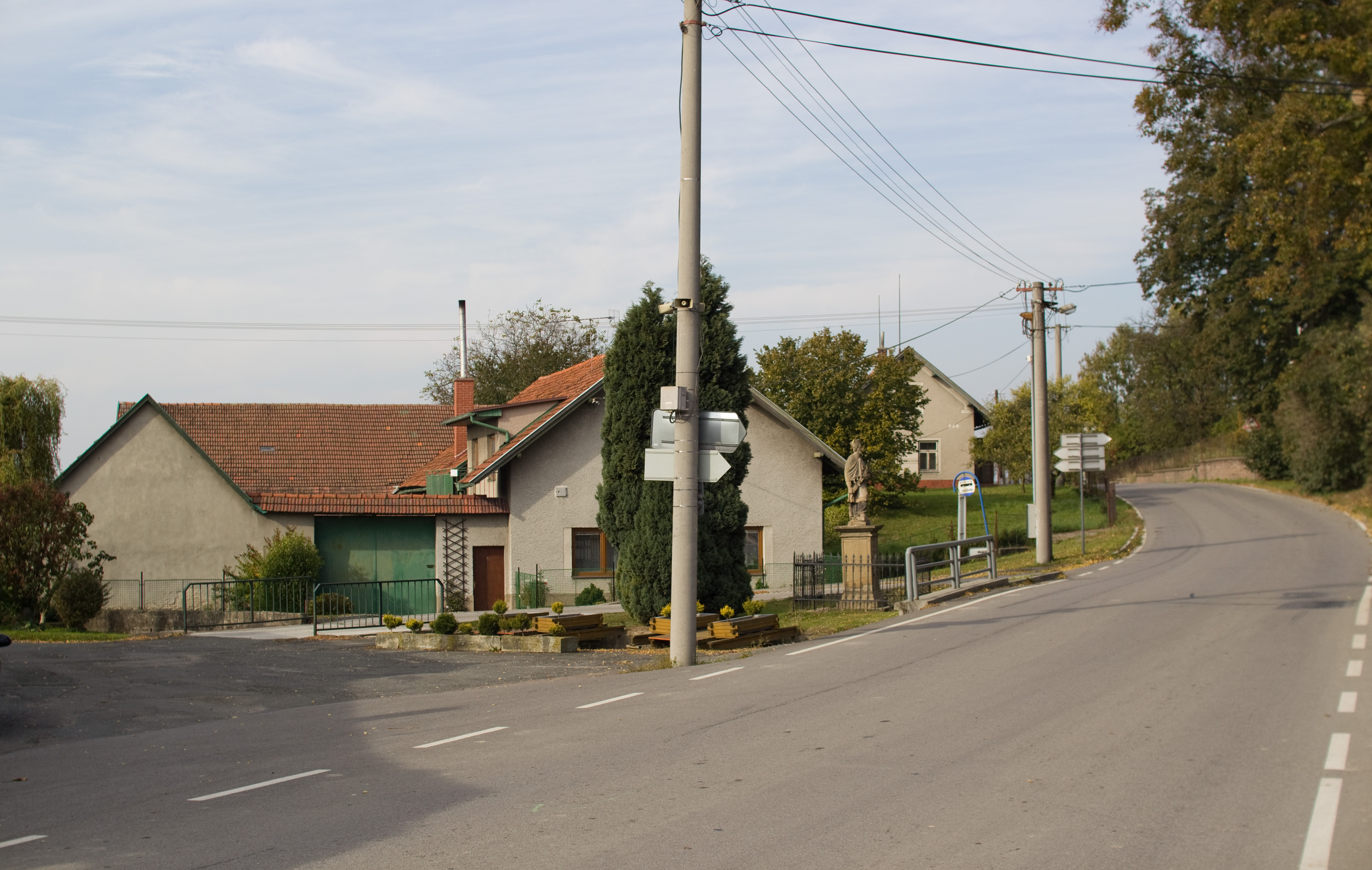
- Main road

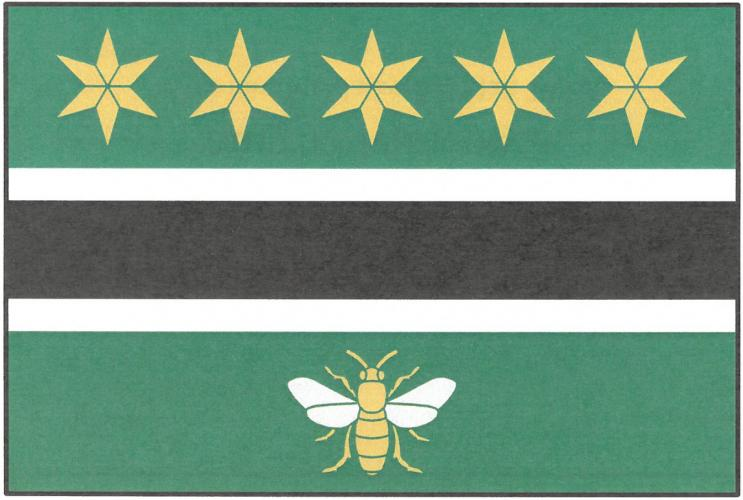
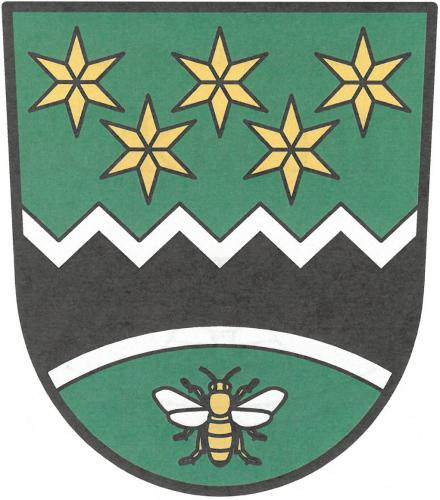
- Flag Coat of arms

- Location in the Czech Republic
- Coordinates: 50°4′45″N 16°14′5″E
- Country: Czech Republic
- Region: Hradec Králové
- District: Rychnov nad Kněžnou
- First mentioned: 1227

Area
  - Total: 1.69 km^{2} (0.65 sq mi)
- Elevation: 325 m (1,066 ft)

Population (2026-01-01)
  - Total: 109
  - Density: 64.5/km^{2} (167/sq mi)
- Time zone: UTC+1 (CET)
  - Summer (DST): UTC+2 (CEST)
- Postal code: 517 41
- Website: www.obec-krchleby.cz

Krchleby (German: Kirchles) is a municipality and village in Rychnov nad Kněžnou District in the Hradec Králové Region of the Czech Republic. It has about 100 inhabitants.

== Demographics ==
Historical population
Year	Pop.	±%
1869	207	—
1880	216	+4.3%
1890	189	−12.5%
1900	184	−2.6%
1910	166	−9.8%
1921	169	+1.8%
1930	143	−15.4%
1950	116	−18.9%
1961	119	+2.6%
1970	105	−11.8%
1980	90	−14.3%
1991	88	−2.2%
2001	80	−9.1%
2011	80	+0.0%
2021	99	+23.8%
Source: Censuses
