= Dědina =

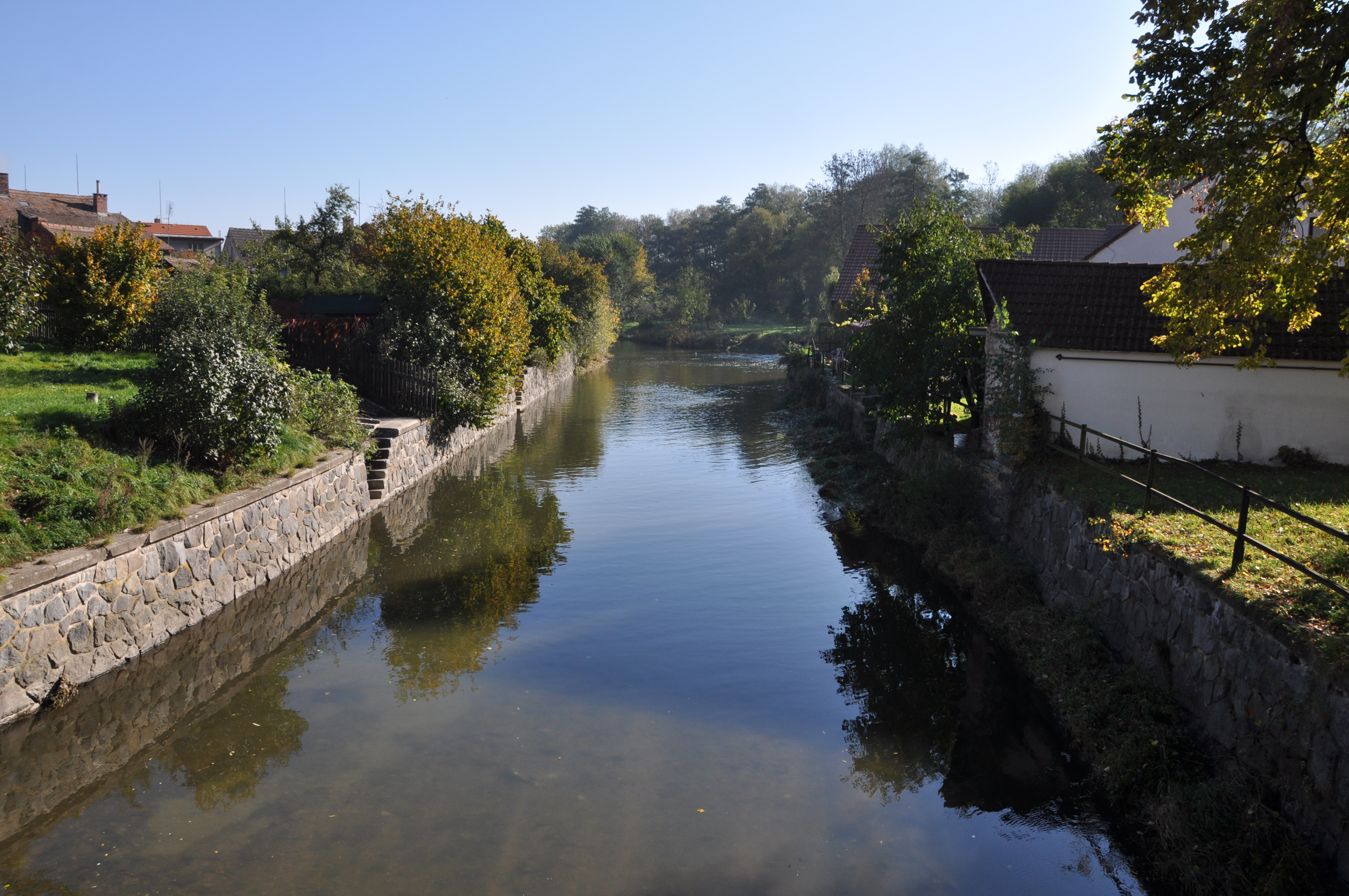
- The Dědina in Třebechovice pod Orebem

Location
- Country: Czech Republic
- Region: Hradec Králové

Physical characteristics
- Source
  - location: Sedloňov, Orlické Mountains
  - coordinates: 50°21′11″N 16°20′0″E
  - elevation: 780 m (2,560 ft)
- Mouth
  - location: Orlice
  - coordinates: 50°11′56″N 15°58′31″E
  - elevation: 236 m (774 ft)
- Length: 56.7 km (35.2 mi)
- Basin size: 367.7 km^{2} (142.0 sq mi)
- Discharge
  - average: 2.28 m^{3}/s (81 cu ft/s) near estuary

Basin features
- Progression: Orlice→ Elbe→ North Sea

The Dědina (Czech pronunciation: [ˈɟɛɟɪna]; also called Zlatý potok) is a river in the Czech Republic, a right tributary of the Orlice River. It flows through the Hradec Králové Region. It is 56.7 km (35.2 mi) long.

== Etymology ==
The Czech word dědina denoted 'inherited property' and regionally also 'village'. Until 1984, the upper and middle course of the river was called Zlatý potok (meaning 'golden stream'). However, for the sake of simplification, the official name of the river was unified and the name Zlatý potok is used only for the artificial branch of the Dědina and for a small tributary in the upper course of the Dědina. An effort to re-name the river to its historical name was unsuccessful due to the cost it would entail.

== Characteristic ==
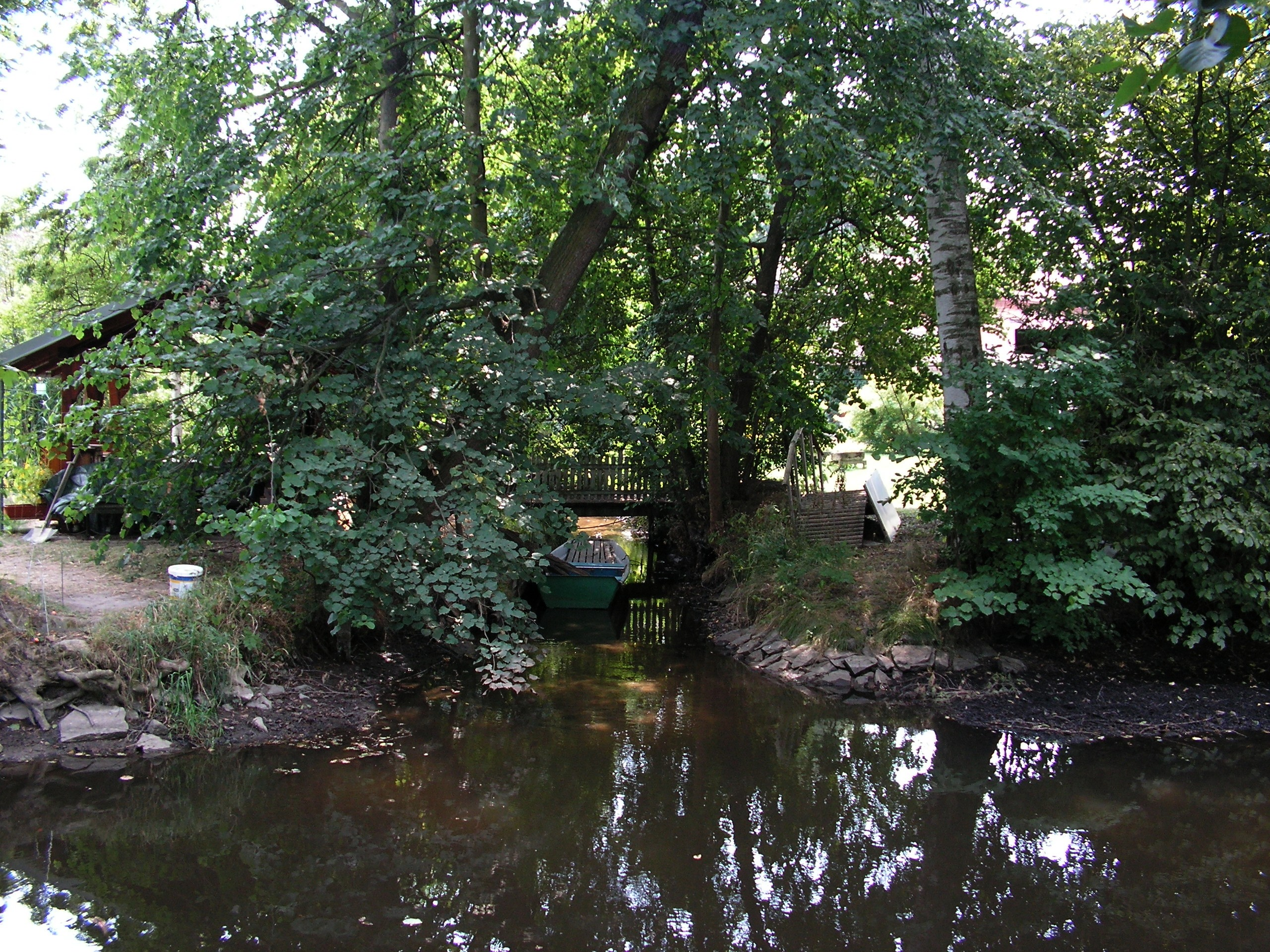
Alba canal joining the Dědina

The Dědina originates in the territory of Sedloňov in the Orlické Mountains at an elevation of 766 m (2,513 ft) and flows to Třebechovice pod Orebem, where it enters the Orlice River at an elevation of 236 m (774 ft). It is 56.7 km (35.2 mi) long. Its drainage basin has an area of 367.7 km^{2} (142.0 sq mi).

In Dobruška-Chábory the flow of the river divides. The southern branch is the secondary flow, artificially created for irrigation and for supplying fishponds. The two branches join again in České Meziříčí.

Dědina has many tributaries, but none of them is significant. In addition to natural tributaries, the river also receives water from the Alba canal, which connects the Dědina with the Bělá River. The canal was built in several phases from the end of the 14th century until 1550. It used to feed a system of fishponds, which no longer exist today. It is a historically important example of landscape modifications in the Middle Ages, which is protected as a cultural monument.

The longest tributaries of the Dědina are:

Tributary	Length (km)	River km	Side
Alba	17.4	1.9	right
Brtevský potok	8.7	25.7	right
Hluky	6.8	45.5	left
Haťský potok	6.7	11.0	right

== Course ==
The most populous settlement on the river is the town of Dobruška. The river flows through the municipal territories of Sedloňov, Sněžné, Dobřany, Bystré, Kounov, Bačetín, Dobré, Bílý Újezd, Podbřezí, Dobruška, Bohuslavice, Pohoří, České Meziříčí, Mokré, Očelice, Ledce and Třebechovice pod Orebem.

The Zlatý potok branch flows through Dobruška, Semechnice, Opočno, Pohoří and České Meziříčí.

== Bodies of water ==
There are 351 bodies of water in the basin area. The largest of them is the fishpond Broumar with an area of 54.5 ha (135 acres), supplied by the Zlatý potok branch.

== Nature ==
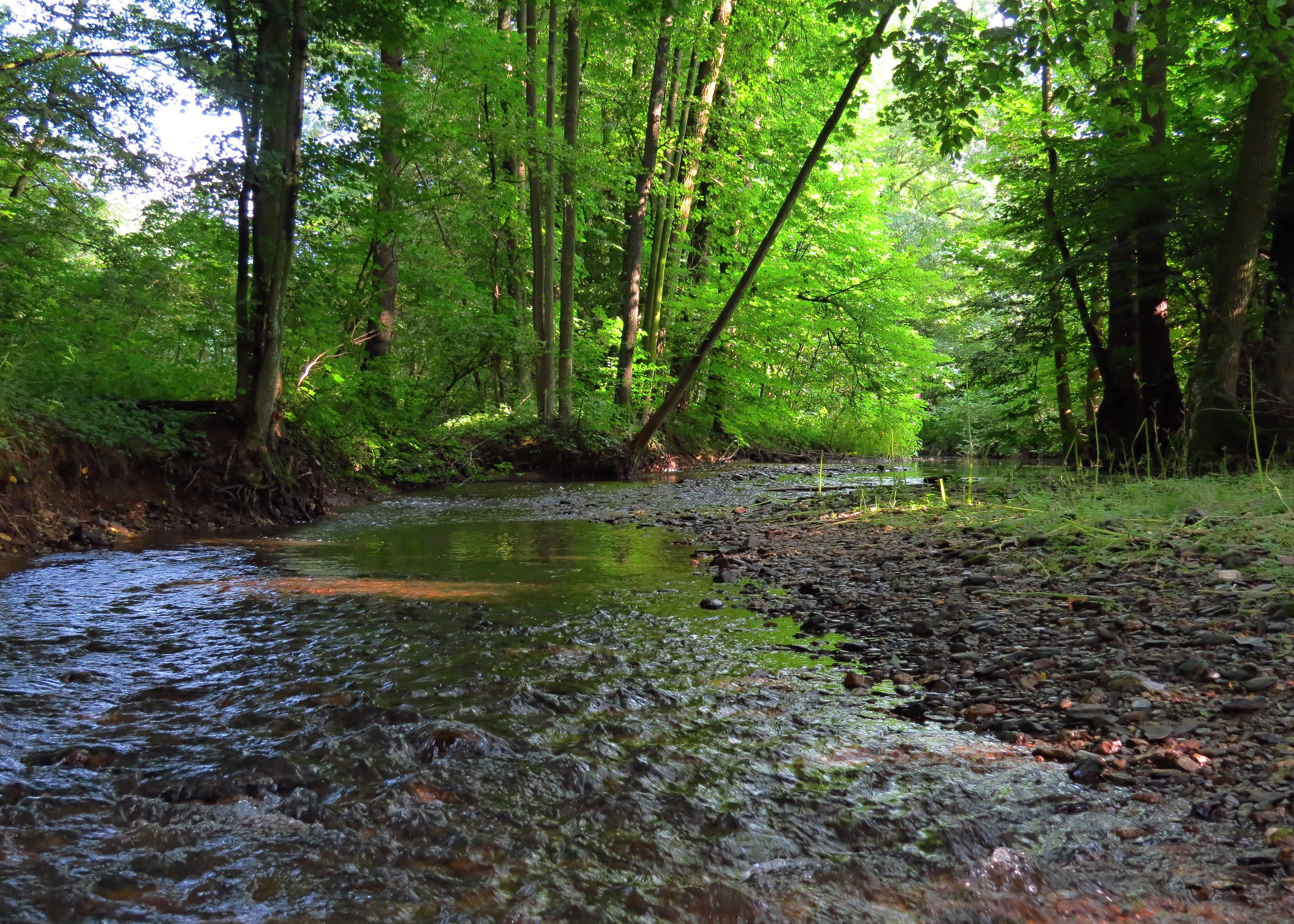
Dědina u Dobrušky Nature Monument

The Dědina originates in the territory of the Orlické hory Protected Landscape Area. The river bed in its middle course is protected as the Dědina u Dobrušky Nature Monument. It has an area of 9.0 ha (22 acres). The reason is the protection of the habitat and communities of the brook lamprey and the European bullhead.

In Bohuslavice, the Dědina flows through the Zbytka Nature Reserve with an area of 82.8 ha (205 acres). The subject of protection are floodplain forests, wet meadows and the meandering course of the river, where many protected species of plants and animals can be found.

== See also ==
- List of rivers of the Czech Republic
