= Nedvězí =

Nedvězí may refer to places in the Czech Republic:

- Nedvězí (Svitavy District), a municipality and village in the Pardubice Region
- Nedvězí, a village and part of Dubá in the Liberec Region
- Nedvězí, a village and part of Kounov (Rychnov nad Kněžnou District) in the Hradec Králové Region
- Nedvězí, a village and part of Olomouc in the Olomouc Region
- Nedvězí, a village and part of Rabyně in the Central Bohemian Region
- Nedvězí, a village and part of Rohle in the Olomouc Region
- Nedvězí, a village and part of Slaná (Semily District) in the Liberec Region
- Nedvězí u Říčan, a municipal part of Prague
