= Dedina =

Dedina may refer to:

- Dedina, Serbia, a village near Kruševac
- Dedina, Croatia, a village near Sveti Petar Orehovec
- Dedina, Bulgaria, a village in the Zlataritsa Municipality
- Dědina, a river in the Czech Republic

== See also ==
- Dedina Bara
