= Sněžné =

Sněžné may refer to places in the Czech Republic:

- Sněžné (Žďár nad Sázavou District), a market town in the Vysočina Region
- Sněžné (Rychnov nad Kněžnou District), a municipality and village in the Hradec Králové Region
