= Kounov =

Kounov may refer to places in the Czech Republic:

- Kounov (Rakovník District), a municipality and village in the Central Bohemian Region
- Kounov (Rychnov nad Kněžnou District), a municipality and village in the Hradec Králové Region
