= Dobřany (Rychnov nad Kněžnou District) =

- Municipality
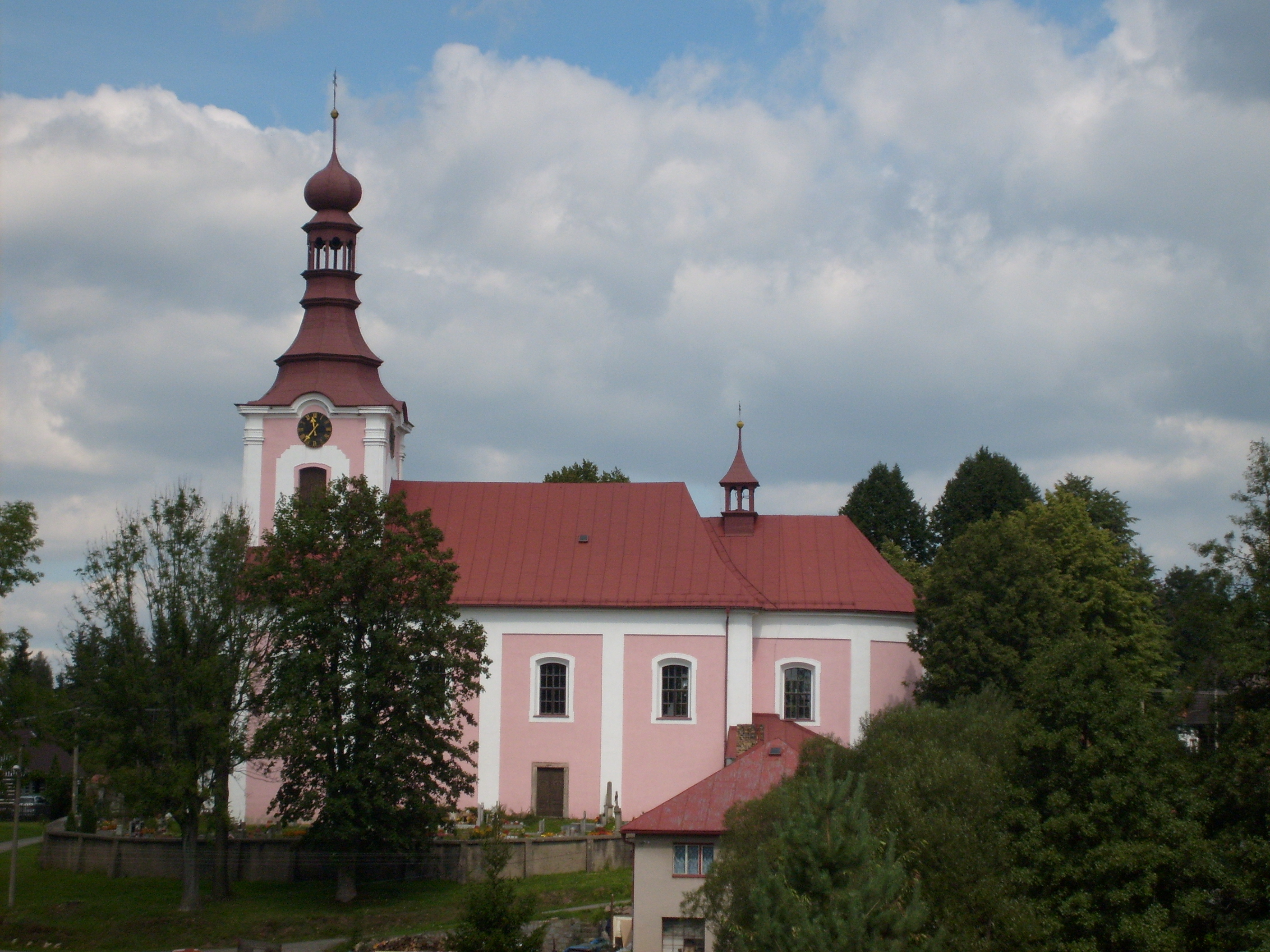
- Church of Saint Nicholas

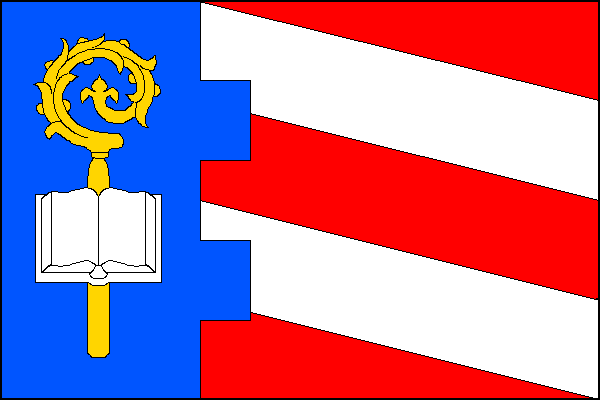
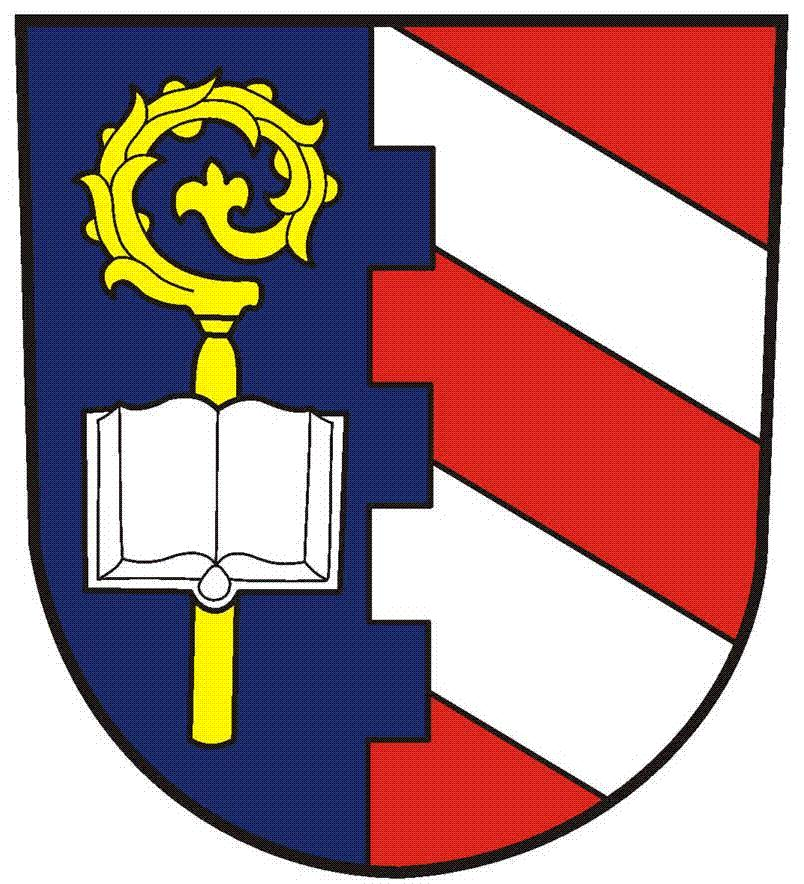
- Flag Coat of arms

- Location in the Czech Republic
- Coordinates: 50°19′20″N 16°17′7″E
- Country: Czech Republic
- Region: Hradec Králové
- District: Rychnov nad Kněžnou
- First mentioned: 1361

Area
  - Total: 4.06 km^{2} (1.57 sq mi)
- Elevation: 630 m (2,070 ft)

Population (2026-01-01)
  - Total: 139
  - Density: 34.2/km^{2} (88.7/sq mi)
- Time zone: UTC+1 (CET)
  - Summer (DST): UTC+2 (CEST)
- Postal code: 518 01
- Website: www.obecdobrany.cz

Dobřany (German: Dobschan) is a municipality and village in Rychnov nad Kněžnou District in the Hradec Králové Region of the Czech Republic. It has about 100 inhabitants.

== Etymology ==
The name is derived from the Czech adjective dobrá (i.e. 'good'). It referred to good (fertile) land.

== Geography ==
Dobřany is located about 17 kilometres (11 mi) north of Rychnov nad Kněžnou and 33 km (21 mi) east of Hradec Králové. It lies in the Orlické Foothills. The highest point is a nameless hill at 775 m (2,543 ft) above sea level. The Dědina River flows along the western municipal border.

== History ==
The first written mention of Dobřany is from 1361. Until the establishment of an independent municipality in 1848, the village belonged to the Opočno estate.

== Demographics ==
Historical population

Year	Pop.	±%
1869	466	—
1880	434	−6.9%
1890	466	+7.4%
1900	411	−11.8%
1910	388	−5.6%

Year	Pop.	±%
1921	337	−13.1%
1930	332	−1.5%
1950	218	−34.3%
1961	183	−16.1%
1970	151	−17.5%

Year	Pop.	±%
1980	132	−12.6%
1991	130	−1.5%
2001	105	−19.2%
2011	131	+24.8%
2021	128	−2.3%

Source: Censuses

== Transport ==
There are no railways or major roads passing through the municipality.

== Sights ==
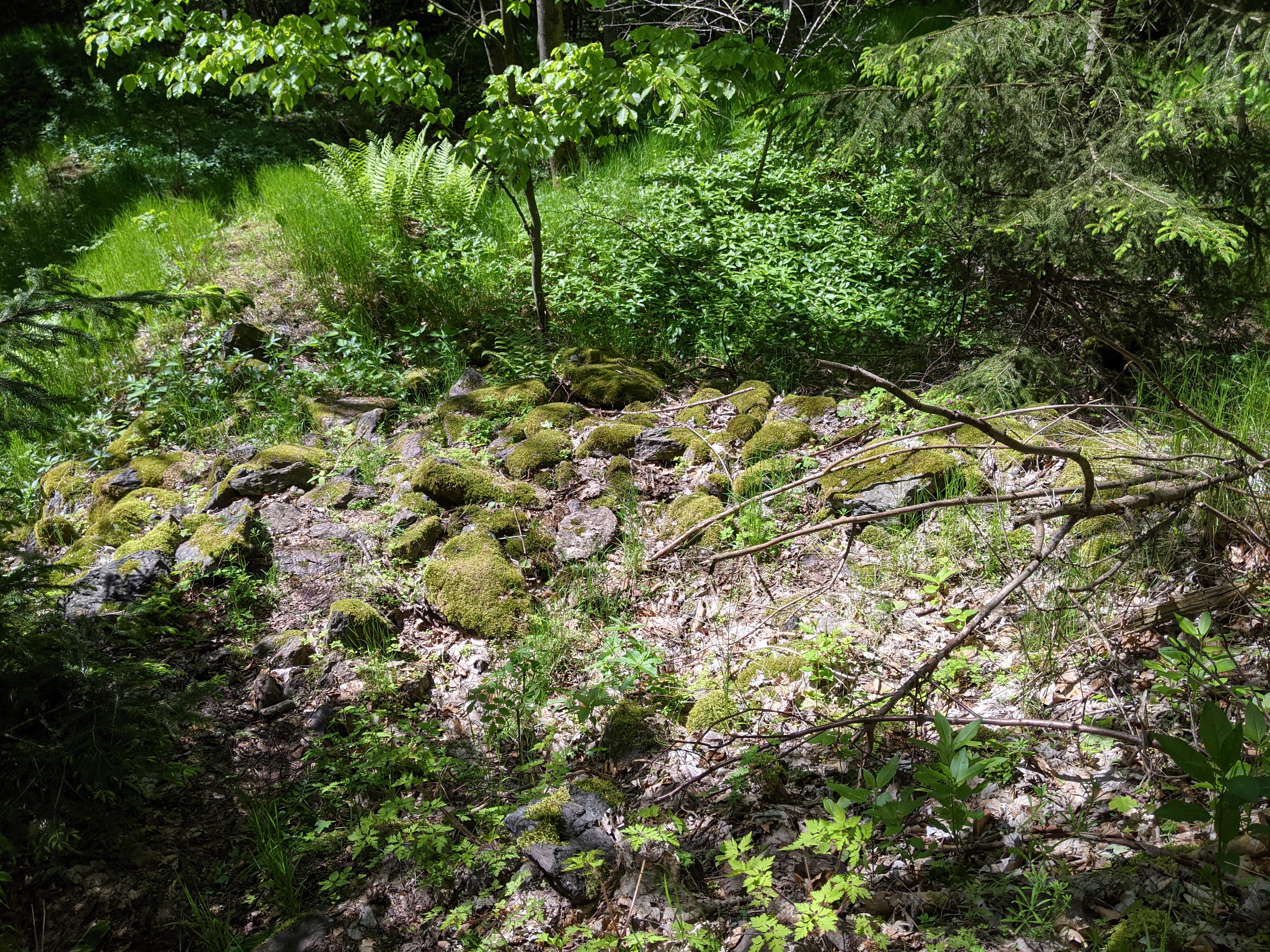
Ruin of the Dobřany Castle

The main landmark of Dobřany is the Church of Saint Nicholas. It was built in the Baroque style in 1738–1740 on the site of an older church.

A cultural monument is also the nearby rectory, dating from 1776. The wooden house is an example of local folk architecture. At the beginning of the 19th century, the patriotic priest Josef Liboslav Ziegler worked here. The rectory then became an important regional centre of the Czech National Revival, where notable personalities met, such as Josef Dobrovský, František Vladislav Hek and Magdalena Dobromila Rettigová. Today the house serves as a recreational facility.

On a hill above the Dědina River in the western part of the municipality there is a ruin of the Dobřany Castle. The castle was founded at the end of the 13th century at the earliest, but more likely at the beginning of the 14th century. No written records have been preserved about the castle. It was probably abandoned already in the 14th century and disappeared during the Hussite Wars in 1425, when it was conquered by the Orebites. It was a two-part bergfried-type castle. It is a tourist destination, but only a little of the castle has survived to this day.
