= České Meziříčí =

- Municipality
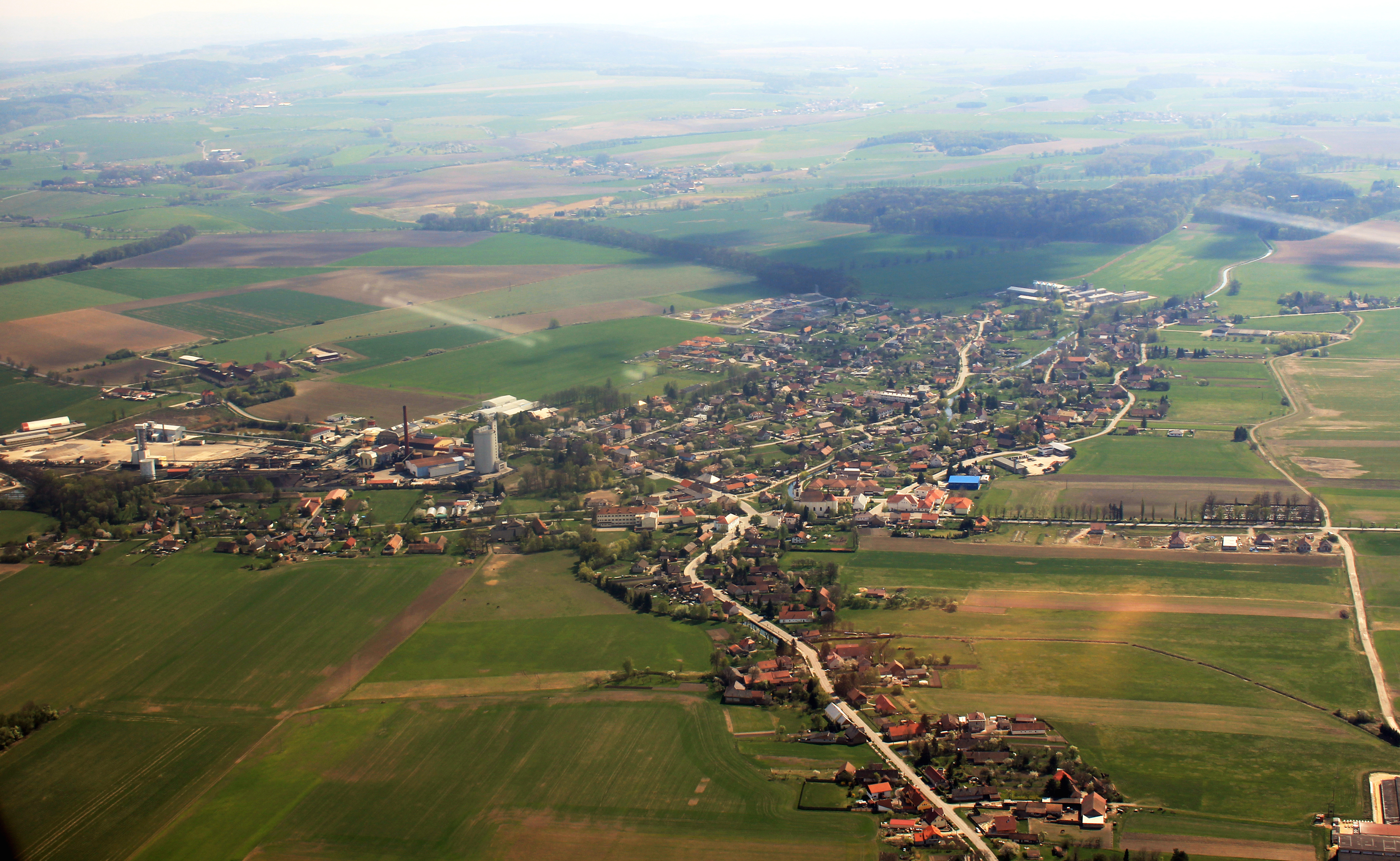
- Aerial view

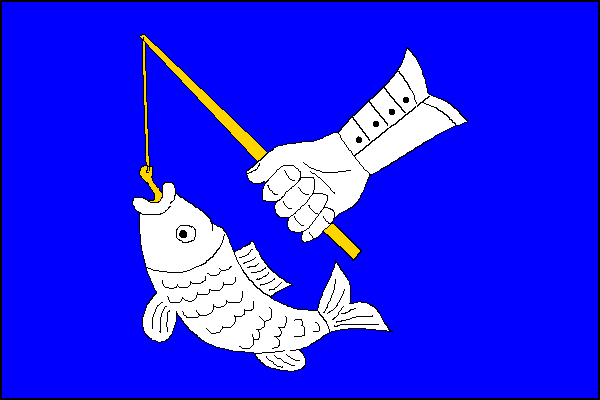
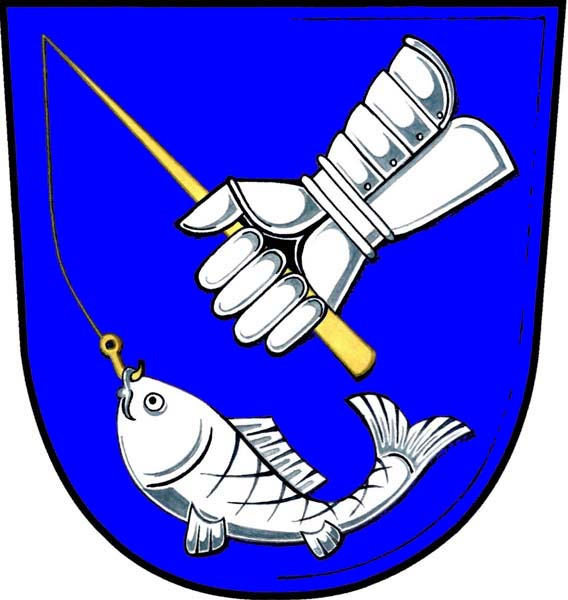
- Flag Coat of arms

- Location in the Czech Republic
- Coordinates: 50°17′13″N 16°2′40″E
- Country: Czech Republic
- Region: Hradec Králové
- District: Rychnov nad Kněžnou
- First mentioned: 1352

Area
  - Total: 21.90 km^{2} (8.46 sq mi)
- Elevation: 254 m (833 ft)

Population (2026-01-01)
  - Total: 2,044
  - Density: 93.33/km^{2} (241.7/sq mi)
- Time zone: UTC+1 (CET)
  - Summer (DST): UTC+2 (CEST)
- Postal code: 517 71
- Website: www.ceskemezirici.cz

České Meziříčí (German: Böhmisch Meseritsch) is a municipality and village in Rychnov nad Kněžnou District in the Hradec Králové Region of the Czech Republic. It has about 2,000 inhabitants.

== Administrative division ==
České Meziříčí consists of three municipal parts (in brackets population according to the 2021 census):

- České Meziříčí (1,793)
- Skršice (114)
- Tošov (34)

== Etymology ==
The Czech word meziříčí translates as '[area] between the rivers'. The initial name of České Meziříčí (i.e. 'Bohemian/Czech Meziříčí') was just Meziříčí. In the 14th century, the village was also alternativelly called by its German name Kunigswald ("king's forest"). In the 1920s, it acquired its current name.

== Geography ==
České Meziříčí is located about 16 kilometres (10 mi) northeast of Hradec Králové. It lies in a flat agricultural landscape in the Orlice Table. The Dědina River flows through the municipality.

== History ==
The first written mention of České Meziříčí is from 1352.

== Demographics ==
Historical population

Year	Pop.	±%
1869	1,887	—
1880	2,308	+22.3%
1890	2,325	+0.7%
1900	2,353	+1.2%
1910	2,304	−2.1%

Year	Pop.	±%
1921	2,329	+1.1%
1930	2,064	−11.4%
1950	1,621	−21.5%
1961	1,674	+3.3%
1970	1,599	−4.5%

Year	Pop.	±%
1980	1,567	−2.0%
1991	1,522	−2.9%
2001	1,567	+3.0%
2011	1,796	+14.6%
2021	1,941	+8.1%

Source: Censuses

== Transport ==
There are no railways (except for one spur line) or major roads passing through the municipality.

== Sights ==
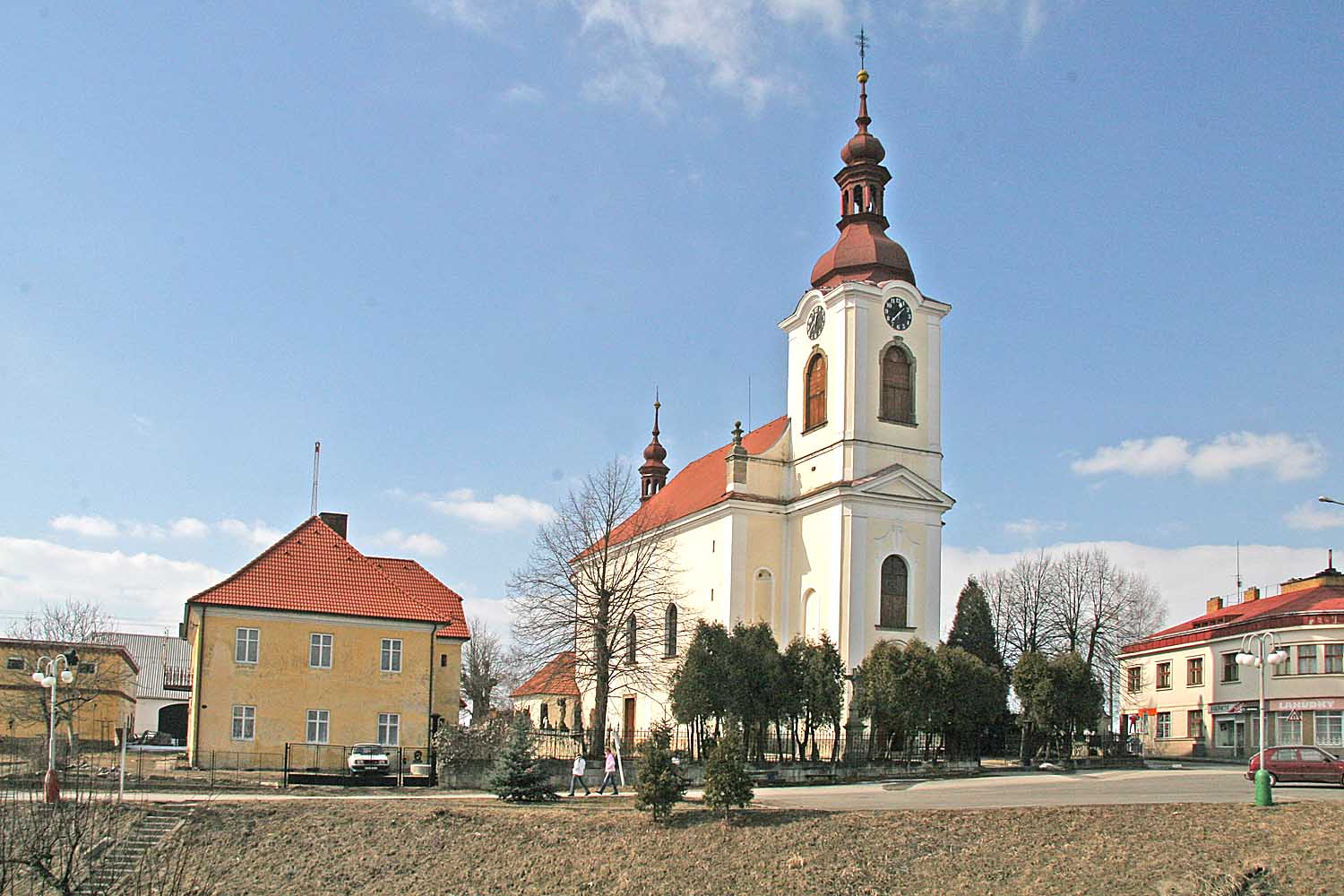
Church of Saint Catherine

The main landmark of Bohuňovice is the Church of Saint Catherine. It was built in the Baroque style in 1748–1752. It replaced an old wooden church, which was as old as the settlement.

== Notable people ==
- Karel Otčenášek (1920–2011), Catholic bishop
