= Zdeněk Kárník =

Czech historian and pedagogue (1931-2011)

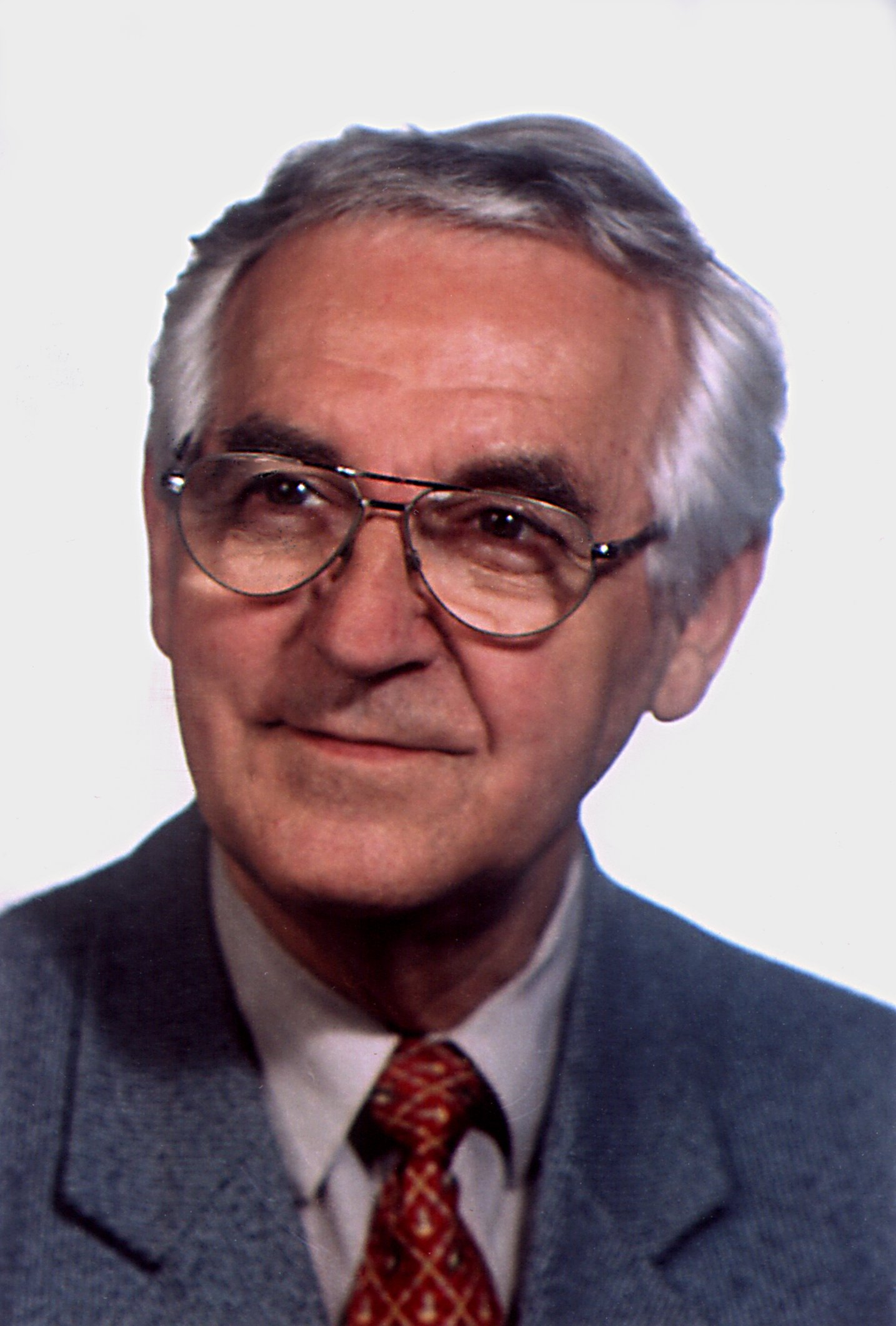
Zdeněk Kárník

Prof. PhDr. Zdeněk Kárník, DrSc. (Czech pronunciation: [ˈZdenyek 'Car-neek]; 25 June 1931 in Dobré – 30 September 2011 in Prague) was a Czech historian and pedagogue.

== Life ==
Zdeněk Kárník was born to the family of eastern Bohemian tradesman František Kárník. His early influences include his elder brother František who worked as a lecturer and later as an assistant professor at Vysoká škola politických a hospodářských věd (University of Political and Economic Sciences) and was a resolute patriot and an anti-nazi resistance supporter during World War II; he died prematurely at age 38. Zdeněk Kárník graduated from the Reálné gymnázium F. M. Pelcla (F. M. Pelcl Gymnasium) in Rychnov nad Kněžnou and was a student of the Faculty of Social Sciences of the UPES from 1950; the Faculty was merged with the Faculty of Philosophy and History of the Charles University from 1952; and he started teaching at the institution in 1954, becoming a modern Czechoslovak history lecturer in 1965. Zdeněk Kárník got involved in the renascence movement of 1968 at the Faculty; as a result, he had to quit teaching in 1969 and was forced to leave the faculty altogether one year later. He was permitted to return in 1990 (as the Head of the Social History Seminar of the Institute for Economic and Social History). In the meantime (1970–1990), he worked at the State Heritage Care Centre for the Central Bohemian Region. He published in the samizdat (as an editor of Historický sborník - Historical Proceedings, published 1978 to 1989) and/or under other names. He has worked at the Charles University in Prague, Academy of Sciences of the Czech Republic and University of Pedagogy in Hradec Králové – Faculty of Arts, later Faculty of Philosophy of the University of Hradec Králové. In 1993 he was an adjunct professor at Ruhr-Universität Bochum, and he was on internship in Vienna in 1998. A member of the Communist Party of Czechoslovakia between 1956 and 1969, he left the party later on (expulsed in 1970). His hobbies included skiing, hiking, and classical music.

== Brief description of the work ==
Zdeněk Kárník initially focused on the history of the workers' movement and socialist parties, extending his interest later on to the history of the First and Second Czechoslovak Republics (1918–1939) in relation to the period of the existence of Austria-Hungary: Socialisté na rozcestí: Habsburk, Masaryk či Šmeral? (Socialists at the Crossroads: The Habsburg, Masaryk, or Šmeral? 1968, extended edition in 1996), České země v éře První republiky (1918–1938), I–III (Bohemia in the First Republic Era (1918-1938), ed. 2000-2003), Malé dějiny československé (1867–1939) (Small History of Czechoslovakia (1867–1039), 2007). Professor Kárník's professional creed was: “Find the cause of the phenomenon regardless of others’ and your own previous conviction or opinion.”

In his inaugural dissertation, První pokusy o založení komunistické strany v Čechách (Initial Attempts at Founding a Communist Party in Bohemia), he focused on radical leftist groupings, primarily anarchists and anarchist-communists. His chef d’oeuvre about ‘socialists at the crossroads’ focuses in detail on the developments in the social democrats’ policies in Bohemia during the First World War in the Czech, Austrian-Hungarian, and international political context. The extensive trilogy on the First Republic brings a multifaceted analysis and description of the political, economic, demographic, social, and cultural and scientific development between the two world wars. The book is illustrated with images and tables, and the third tome analyses in detail the tragic period of the way to Munich Agreement. The work also takes into consideration the developments in Slovakia and Carpathian Ruthenia. His subsequent (and again extensive) work with a modest title of Small History of Czechoslovakia (1867–1939) approaches the topic from new positions. The timeline in itself is of principal importance, suggesting that the author examined both the prelude to the rise of the first Czechoslovak state towards the close of the Habsburg monarchy and its epilogue – the Second Republic. The delivery tends towards the non-fiction fiction genre, in places focusing even more on the topics brought up by the ‘trilogy’, with more attention focused on Slovakia. Compared with the ‘trilogy’, the illustrations are much more extensive and illustration captions have the form of extensive explanations.

Kárník's editorial work is also of importance: Karel Kazbunda, Otázka česko-německá v předvečer Velké války (Czech-German Question at the Dawn of the Great War, 1995), Bolševismus, komunismus a radikální socialismus v Československu, I–V (Bolshevism, Communism, and Radical Socialism in Czechoslovakia, 2003–2005), K novověkým sociálním dějinám českých zemí, I–IV (On the Modern Times History of Bohemia, 1998–2001), etc. He also wrote a number of articles, essays, and 2 children's books about a group of boys set in the vicinity of Castle Handštejn during World War II.

Zdeněk Kárník has also contributed to the periodicals Památkářské práce (Heritage Works), Acta Oeconomica Pragensia, Historický obzor (Historical Horizon), Východočeské listy historické (Eastern Bohemian Historical Letters), Acta historica et museologica Universitatis Silesianae Opaviensis et al., to the Larousse encyclopaedia, and a number of collections and publications focusing on heritage preservation.

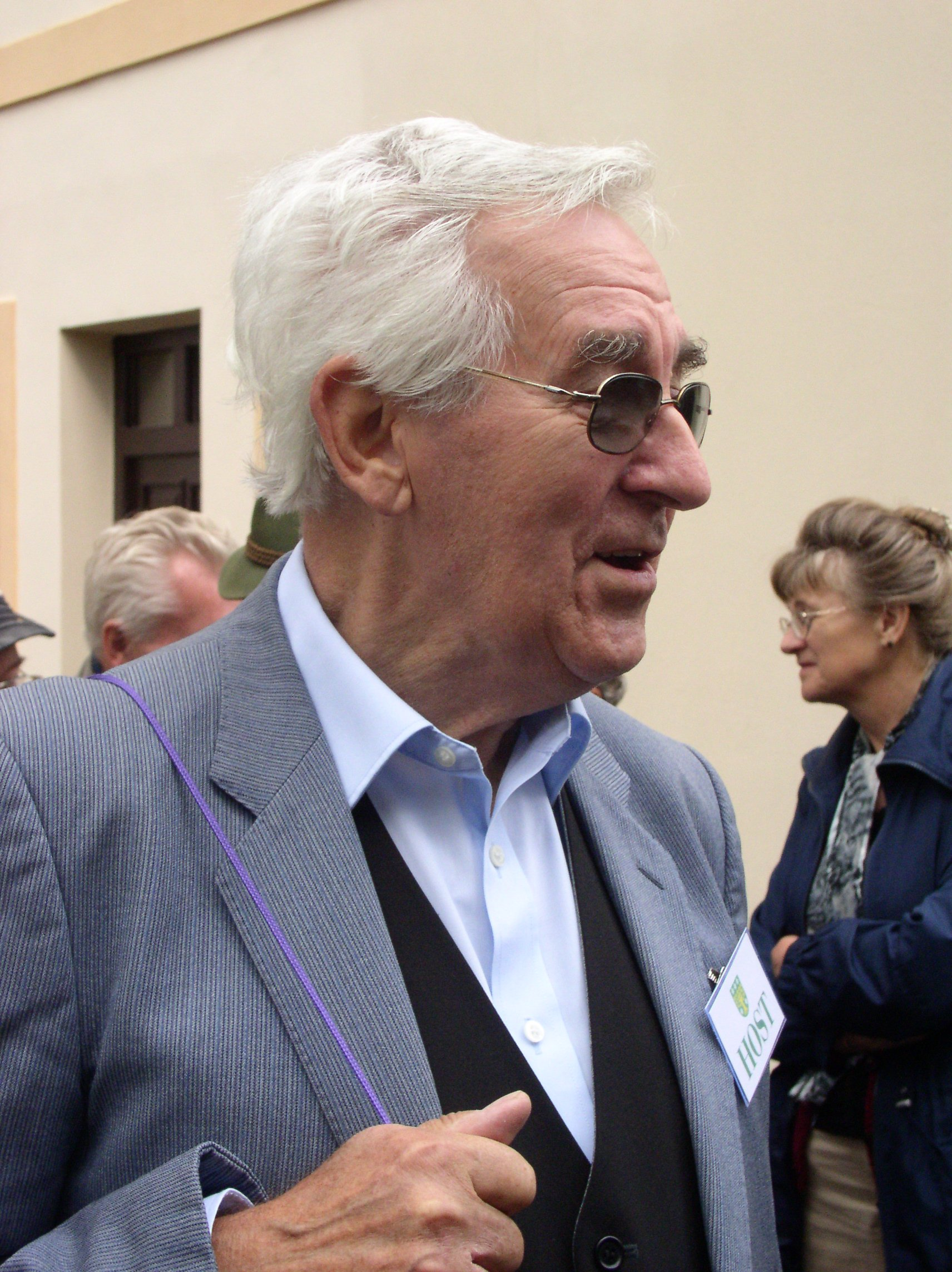
Zdeněk Kárník

== Publications (sample) ==
=== Science and non-fiction ===
- Dělnické rady v českých zemích 1917–1920. Praha : Filozofická fakulta Univerzity Karlovy, 1960.
- Založení KSČ v severovýchodních Čechách. Havlíčkův Brod : Krajské nakladatelství, 1961.
- Za československou republiku rad. Národní výbory a dělnické rady 1917–20. Praha : ČSAV, 1963.
- První pokusy o založení komunistické strany v Čechách. Praha : Academia, 1966.
- Socialisté na rozcestí: Habsburk, Masaryk či Šmeral? (1968), 1996, Praha : Karolinum. ISBN 978-80-7184-128-9.
- Rumburská vzpoura (as Eva Myšková). Ústí nad Labem : Severočeské nakladatelství, 1978. Postavy an události, sv. 6.
- Rozpad Rakousko-Uherska I–II (1988, samizdat).
- České země v éře První republiky (1918–1938). Díl první. Vznik, budování a zlatá léta republiky (1918–1929). Praha : Libri, 2000. ISBN 80-7277-027-6.
- České země v éře První republiky (1918–1938). Díl druhý. Československo a české země v krizi a v ohrožení (1930–1935). Praha : Libri, 2002. ISBN 80-7277-027-6.
- České země v éře První republiky (1918–1938). Díl třetí. O přežití a o život (1936–1938). Praha : Libri, 2003. ISBN 80-7277-119-1.
- Vlastimil Tusar. Novinář, politik, diplomat. Praha : Česká strana sociálně demokratická, 2005. ISBN 80-239-7703-2
- Malé dějiny československé (1867–1939). Praha : Dokořán, 2007. ISBN 978-80-7363-146-8.

=== Articles (German) ===
- Zdeněk Kárník and Vladimír Dubský. Die Anfänge des tschechoslowakischen Staates und die sozialistische Bewegung (1917–1921). In: Die Entstehung der Tschechoslowakischen Republik und ihre national-politische Stellung. Praha 1968, pp. 105–134.
- Die ersten Versuche zur Gründung einer kommunistischen Partei in Böhmen. Archiv für die Geschichte des Widerstandes und Arbeit, No. 14, Bochum 1996.
- Bemühungen um einen deutsch-tschechischen Ausgleich in Österreich unf Folgen ihren Schreiterns. In: State and Nation in multiethnic Society. Boston 1991, pp. 81–97.
- Die tschechoslowakische Sozialdemokratie und tschechischen katholischen politischen Parteien in Böhmen am Anfang des 1. Weltkrieges – Kooperation, Koexistenz, oder Konflikt?. In: Prager Wirtschafts- und Sozialgeschichte, Praha 1994, pp. 105–113.
- Die Haltung der tschechischen politischen Parteien zum Reichsproblem bis zum Völkermanifest Kaisers Karls. In: První světová válka a vztahy mezi Čechy a Němci. (Eds. Hans Mommsen, Dušan Kováč, Jiří Malíř, Michaela Marková). Brno 2000, pp. 13–36.
- Die Erste Republik im Strom der Sozialgeschichte. In: Sozialgeschichte und soziale Bewegungen in der Historiographie der Tschechischen und Slowakischen republik, Mitteilungsblatt des Instituts für Soziale Bewegungen, Hft. 23, 2000, pp. 74–90.

=== For children ===
- Bílá ruka – Za tajemstvím hradu Handštejna. Praha : Knižní klub, 2003. ISBN 80-242-0956-X.
- Bílá ruka a poklad hradu Handštejna. Praha : Dokořán, 2004. ISBN 80-86569-57-8.

=== As editor ===
- Karel Kazbunda, Otázka česko-německá v předvečer Velké války. (Ed. Zdeněk Kárník.) Praha : Karolinum, 1995. ISBN 80-7184-056-4.
- Sborník k problematice multiethnicity. České země jako multietnická společnost: Češi, Němci a Židé ve společenském životě českých zemí 1848–1918. Praha : Filozofická fakulta Univerzity Karlovy, 1996. ISBN 80-85899-17-5.
- K novověkým sociálním dějinám českých zemí I. Čechy mezi tradicí a modernizací 1566–1848. (Eds. Zdeněk Kárník and Jiří Štaif.) Praha : Karolinum, 1999. ISBN 80-7184-930-8.
- K novověkým sociálním dějinám českých zemí II. Z dob rakouských a předlitavských (1848–1918). (Ed. Zdeněk Kárník.) Praha : Karolinum, 1998.
- K novověkým sociálním dějinám českých zemí III. Od války k válce (1914–1939). (Ed. Zdeněk Kárník.) Praha : Karolinum, 2001. ISBN 80-7184-495-0.
- K novověkým sociálním dějinám českých zemí IV. Zvraty a převraty (1939–1992). (Eds. Zdeněk Kárník and Jan Měchýř.) Praha : Karolinum, 2001. ISBN 80-246-0198-2.
- Antologie studijních textů k novověkým sociálním dějinám V/I. (Eds. Jaroslav Čechura and Zdeněk Kárník.) Praha : Karolinum, 2002. ISBN 80-246-0341-1.
- Masaryk, Tomáš Garrigue, 1850–1937. Parlamentní projevy 1907–1914. (Eds. Vratislav Doubek, Zdeněk Kárník and Martin Kučera.) Praha : Masarykův ústav AV ČR, 2002. ISBN 80-86495-11-6.
- Bolševismus, komunismus a radikální socialismus v Československu I. (Eds. Zdeněk Kárník and Michal Kopeček.) Praha : Dokořán, 2003. ISBN 80-86569-60-8.
- Bolševismus, komunismus a radikální socialismus v Československu II. (Eds. Zdeněk Kárník and Michal Kopeček.) Praha : Dokořán, 2004. ISBN 80-86569-77-2.
- Bolševismus, komunismus a radikální socialismus v Československu III. (Eds. Zdeněk Kárník and Michal Kopeček.) Praha : Dokořán, 2005. ISBN 80-7363-006-0.
- Bolševismus, komunismus a radikální socialismus v Československu IV. (Eds. Zdeněk Kárník and Michal Kopeček.) Praha : Dokořán, 2005. ISBN 80-7363-032-X.
- Bolševismus, komunismus a radikální socialismus v Československu V. (Eds. Zdeněk Kárník and Michal Kopeček.) Praha : Dokořán, 2006. ISBN 80-7363-033-8.
