= Dedina Bara =

- Village
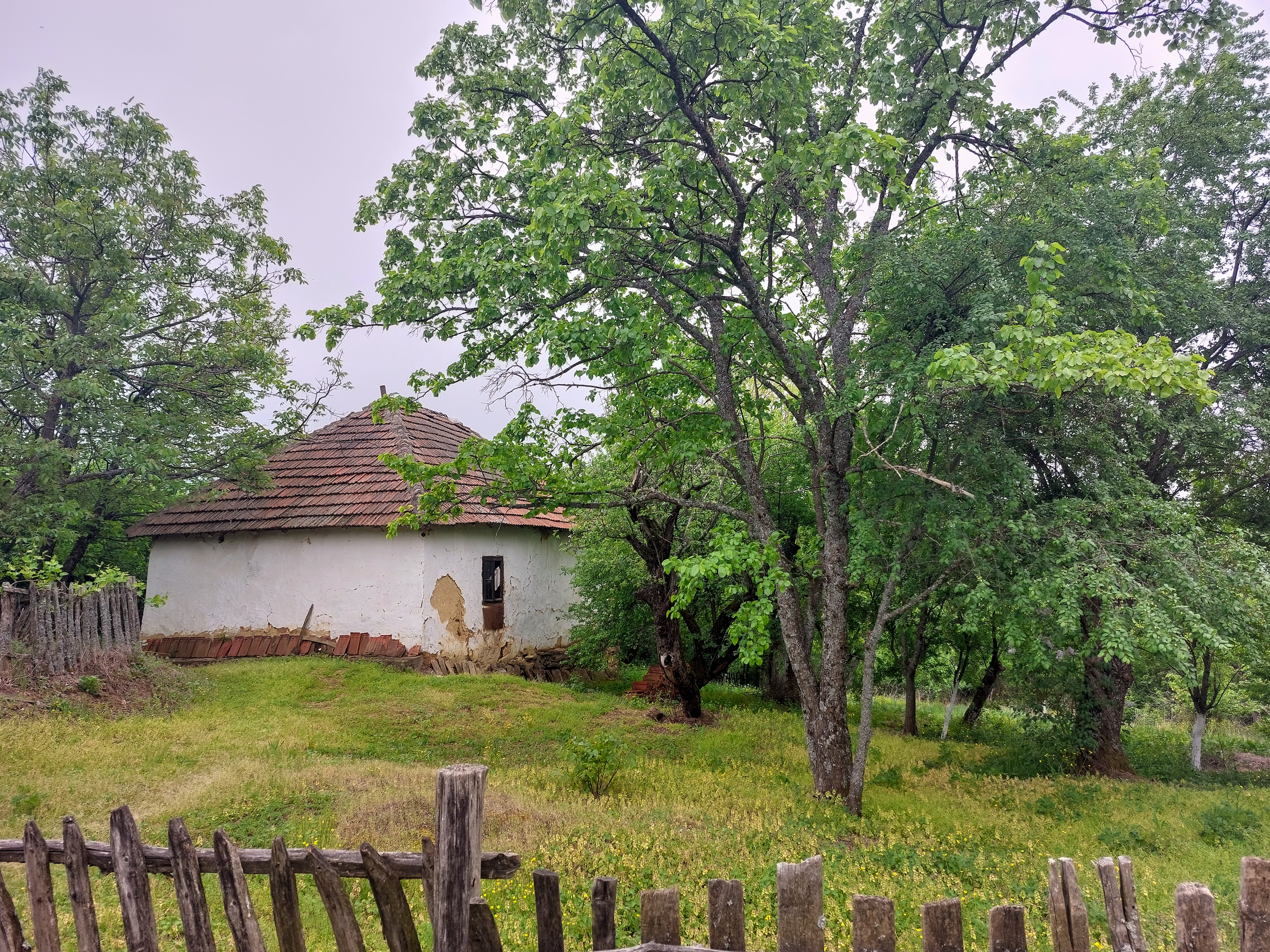

- Location within Serbia
- Coordinates: 42°53′41″N 22°05′44″E
- Country: Serbia
- District: Jablanica District
- Municipality: Leskovac

Population (2002)
  - Total: 802
- Time zone: UTC+1 (CET)
  - Summer (DST): UTC+2 (CEST)

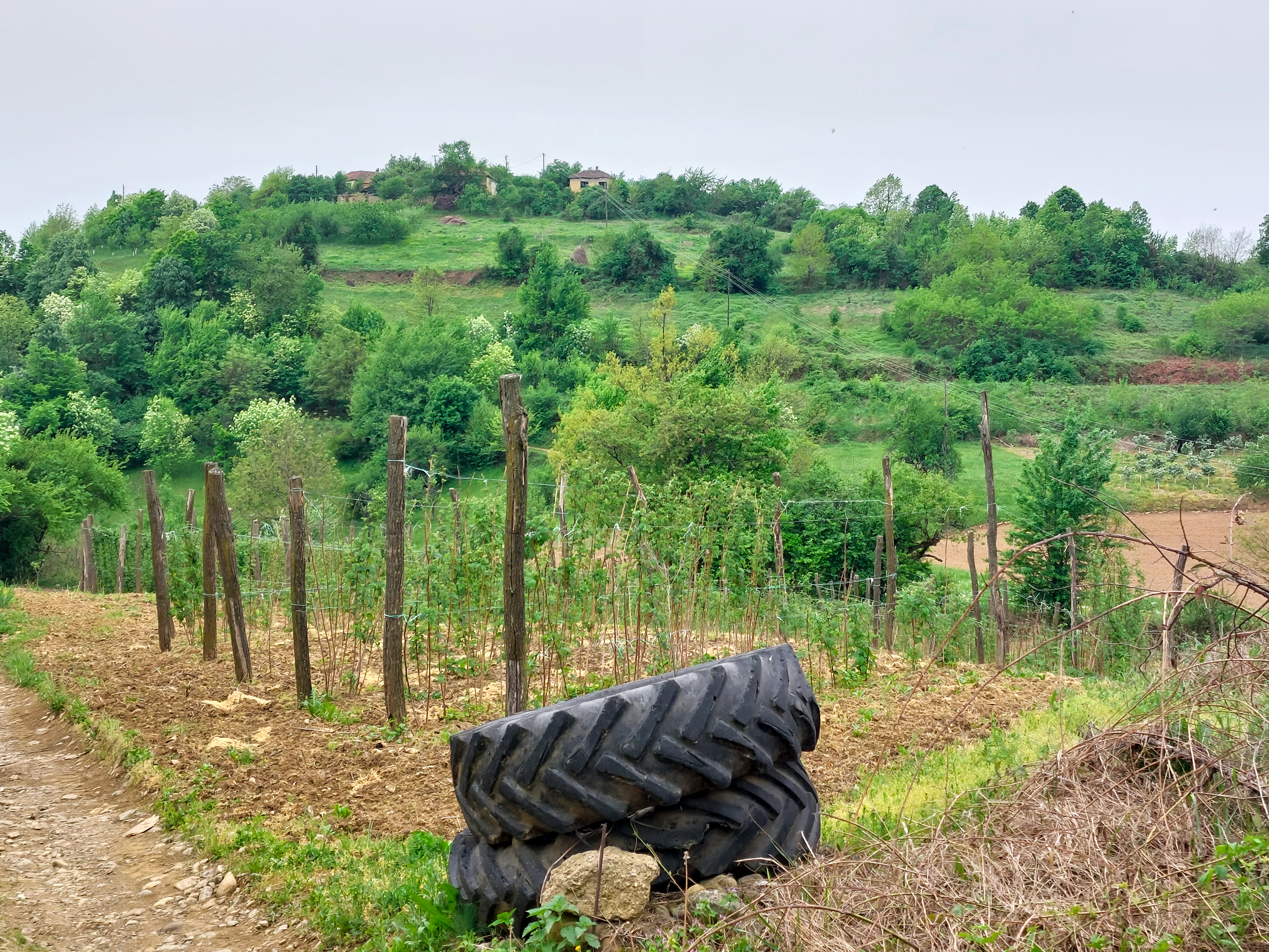
Dedina bara village

Dedina Bara is a village in the municipality of Leskovac, Serbia. According to the 2002 census, the village has a population of 802 people.
