= Nedvězí (Svitavy District) =

- Municipality
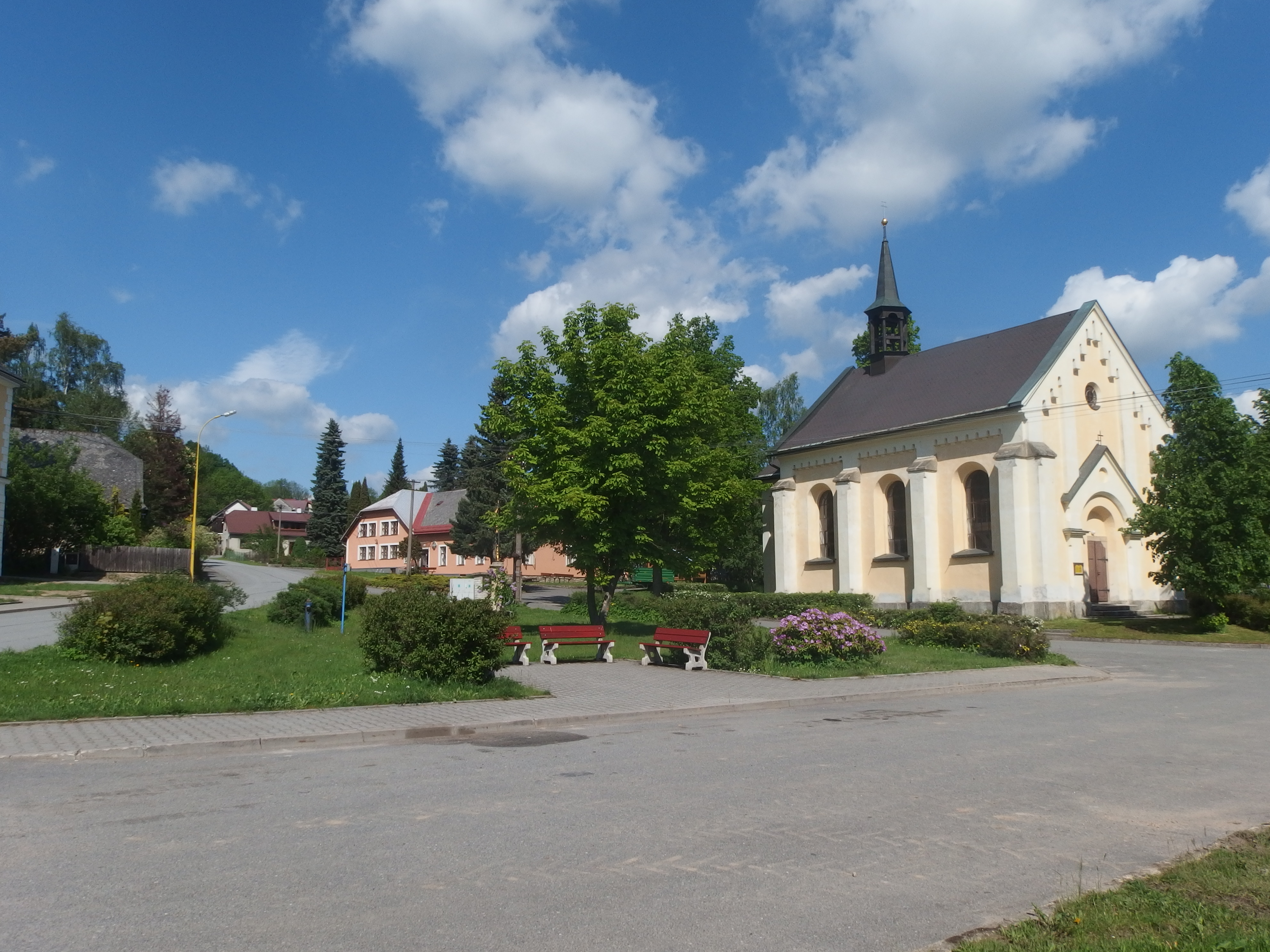
- Centre of Nedvězí with the Church of Saint Procopius

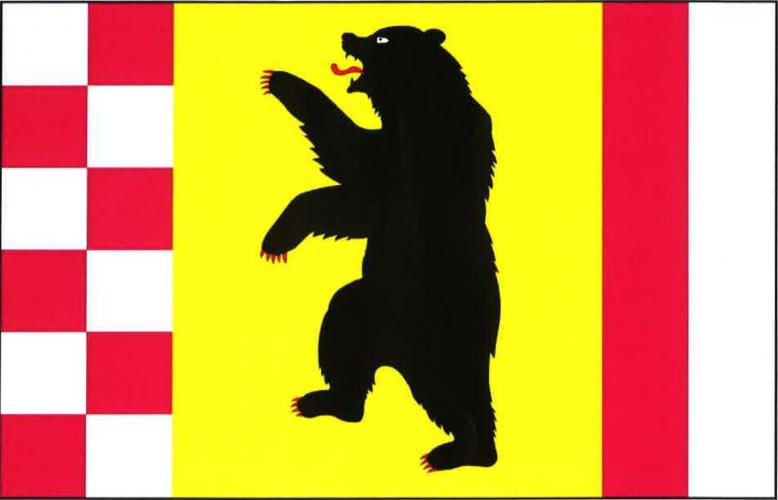
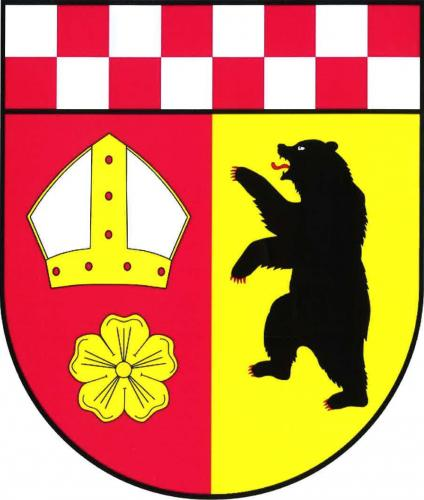
- Flag Coat of arms

- Location in the Czech Republic
- Coordinates: 49°37′50″N 16°18′3″E
- Country: Czech Republic
- Region: Pardubice
- District: Svitavy
- First mentioned: 1474

Area
  - Total: 5.77 km^{2} (2.23 sq mi)
- Elevation: 670 m (2,200 ft)

Population (2026-01-01)
  - Total: 183
  - Density: 31.7/km^{2} (82.1/sq mi)
- Time zone: UTC+1 (CET)
  - Summer (DST): UTC+2 (CEST)
- Postal code: 569 92
- Website: www.obec-nedvezi.cz

Nedvězí (German: Ewitz) is a municipality and village in Svitavy District in the Pardubice Region of the Czech Republic. It has about 200 inhabitants.

Nedvězí lies approximately 19 kilometres (12 mi) south-west of Svitavy, 59 km (37 mi) south-east of Pardubice, and 144 km (89 mi) east of Prague.

== Demographics ==
Historical population
Year	Pop.	±%
1869	457	—
1880	476	+4.2%
1890	538	+13.0%
1900	587	+9.1%
1910	559	−4.8%
1921	532	−4.8%
1930	535	+0.6%
1950	364	−32.0%
1961	348	−4.4%
1970	327	−6.0%
1980	277	−15.3%
1991	261	−5.8%
2001	226	−13.4%
2011	208	−8.0%
2021	200	−3.8%
Source: Censuses
