= Rabyně =

- Municipality
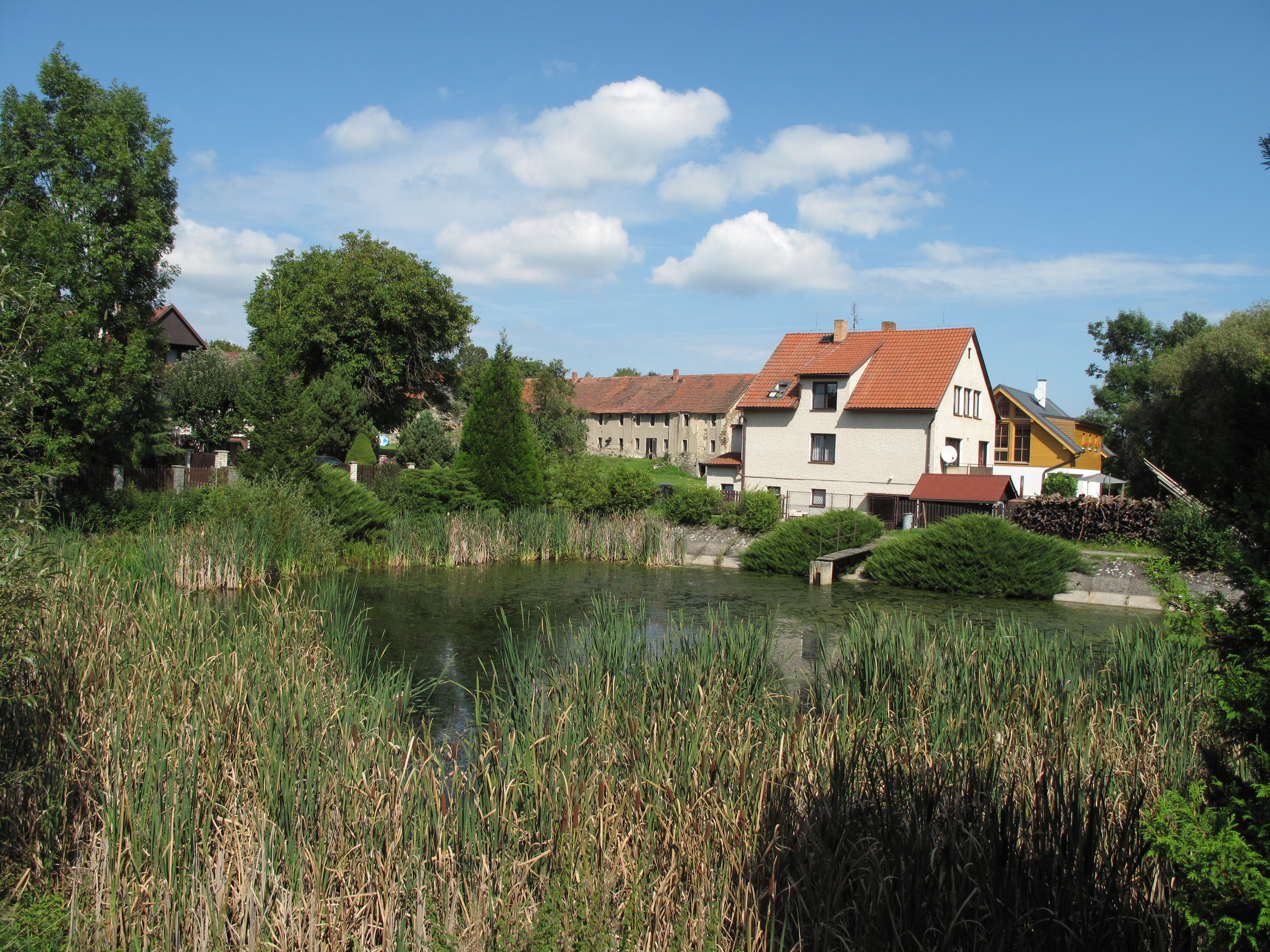
- Pond in the centre of Rabyně

- Location in the Czech Republic
- Coordinates: 49°48′51″N 14°26′10″E
- Country: Czech Republic
- Region: Central Bohemian
- District: Benešov
- First mentioned: 1227

Area
  - Total: 15.89 km^{2} (6.14 sq mi)
- Elevation: 370 m (1,210 ft)

Population (2026-01-01)
  - Total: 289
  - Density: 18.2/km^{2} (47.1/sq mi)
- Time zone: UTC+1 (CET)
  - Summer (DST): UTC+2 (CEST)
- Postal codes: 252 08, 257 44
- Website: www.rabyne-obec.cz

Rabyně is a municipality and village in Benešov District in the Central Bohemian Region of the Czech Republic. It has about 300 inhabitants. It lies on the shore of Slapy Reservoir.

== Administrative division ==
Rabyně consists of five municipal parts (in brackets population according to the 2021 census):

- Rabyně (98)
- Blaženice (64)
- Loutí (46)
- Měřín (62)
- Nedvězí (50)

== Demographics ==
Historical population
Year	Pop.	±%
1869	563	—
1880	565	+0.4%
1890	559	−1.1%
1900	489	−12.5%
1910	513	+4.9%
1921	472	−8.0%
1930	527	+11.7%
1950	288	−45.4%
1961	333	+15.6%
1970	278	−16.5%
1980	224	−19.4%
1991	198	−11.6%
2001	227	+14.6%
2011	278	+22.5%
2021	320	+15.1%
Source: Censuses
