= Dobré, Czech Republic =

Dobré
- Municipality
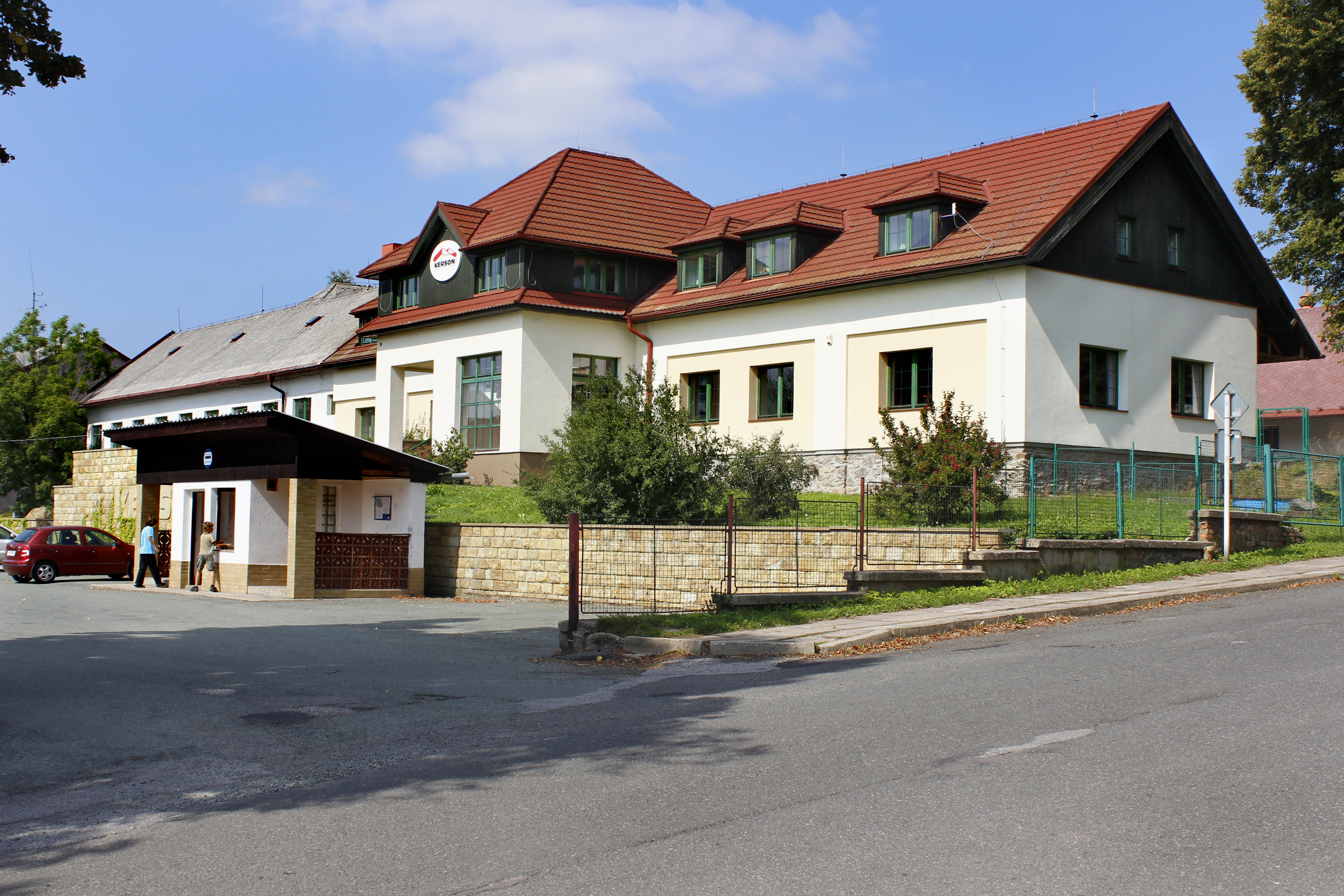
- Bus stop in the centre of Dobré

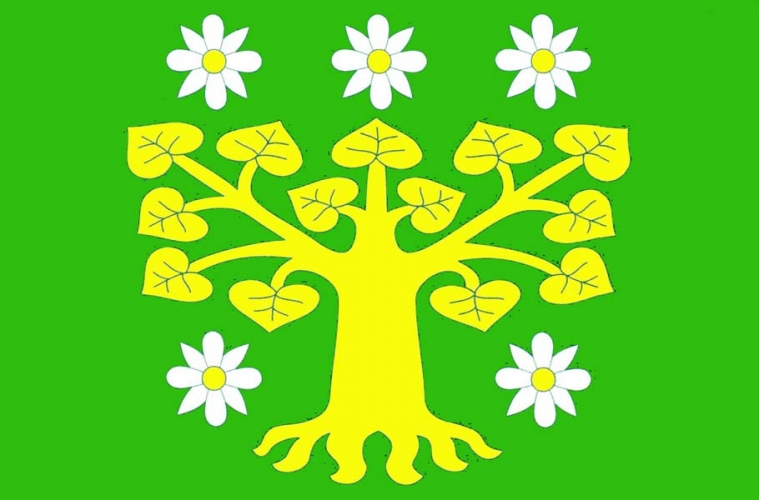
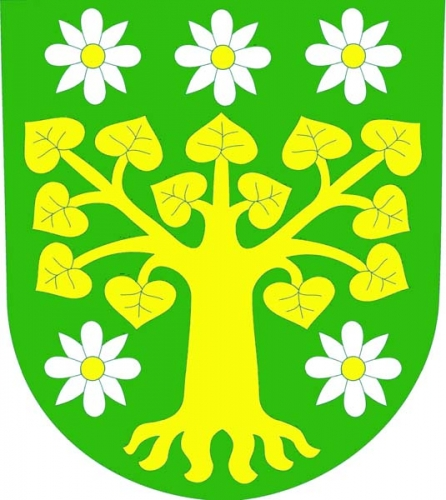
- Flag Coat of arms

- Location in the Czech Republic
- Coordinates: 50°16′11″N 16°15′50″E
- Country: Czech Republic
- Region: Hradec Králové
- District: Rychnov nad Kněžnou
- First mentioned: 1367

Area
  - Total: 17.34 km^{2} (6.70 sq mi)
- Elevation: 435 m (1,427 ft)

Population (2026-01-01)
  - Total: 880
  - Density: 51/km^{2} (130/sq mi)
- Time zone: UTC+1 (CET)
  - Summer (DST): UTC+2 (CEST)
- Postal code: 517 93
- Website: www.obecdobre.cz

Dobré is a municipality and village in Rychnov nad Kněžnou District in the Hradec Králové Region of the Czech Republic. It has about 900 inhabitants.

== Administrative division ==
Dobré consists of six municipal parts (in brackets population according to the 2021 census):

- Dobré (548)
- Chmeliště (12)
- Hlinné (106)
- Kamenice (108)
- Rovné (36)
- Šediviny (25)

== History ==
The first written mention about Dobré is from 1367. It was founded during the colonisation of forests in the 12th and 13th centuries.

== Demographics ==
Historical population
Year	Pop.	±%
1869	1,925	—
1880	1,965	+2.1%
1890	1,999	+1.7%
1900	1,811	−9.4%
1910	1,685	−7.0%
1921	1,583	−6.1%
1930	1,437	−9.2%
1950	1,050	−26.9%
1961	1,014	−3.4%
1970	954	−5.9%
1980	867	−9.1%
1991	779	−10.1%
2001	832	+6.8%
2011	810	−2.6%
2021	835	+3.1%
Source: Censuses

== Notable people ==
- Zdeněk Kárník (1931–2011), historian
