= Bílý Újezd =

- Municipality
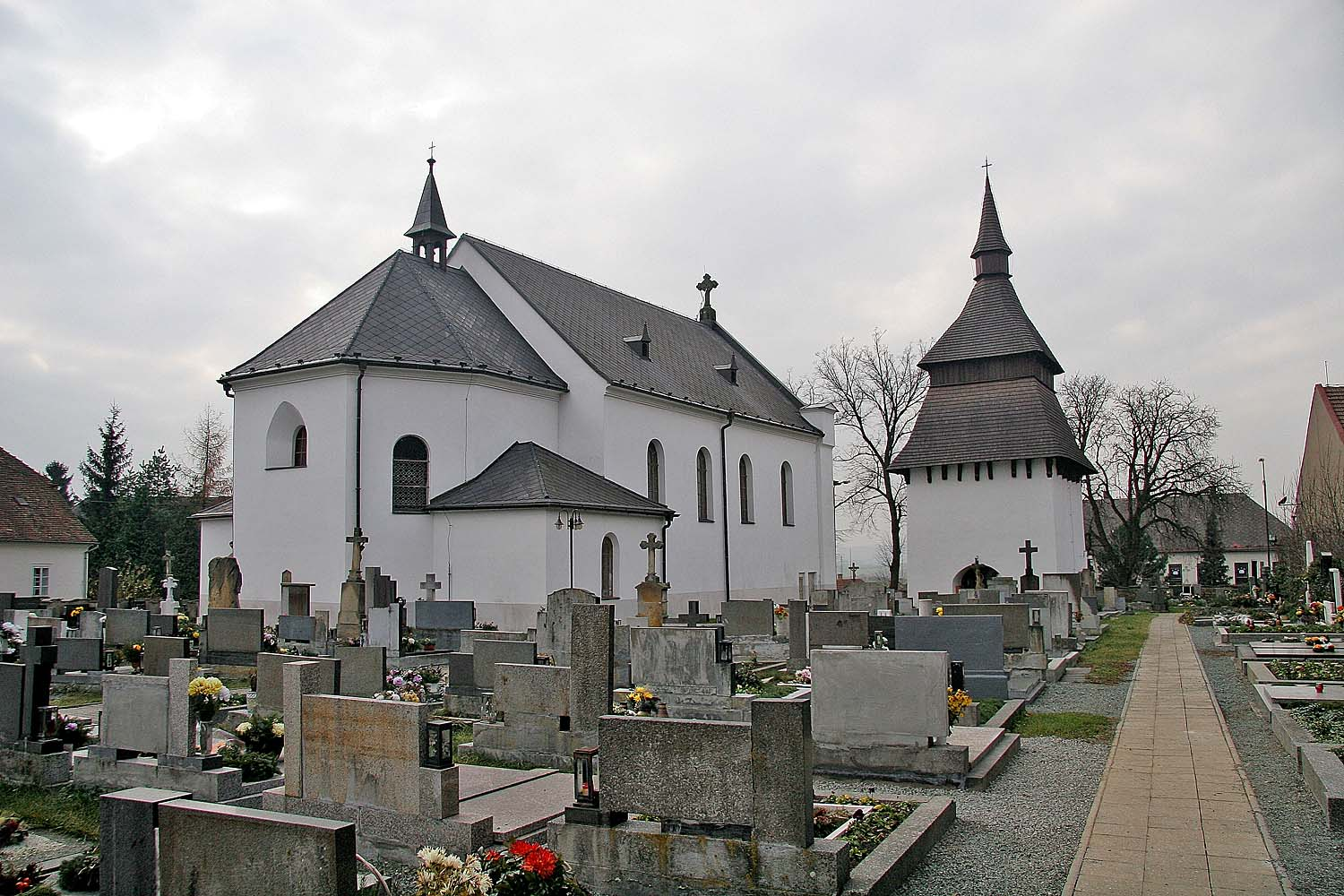
- Church of the Transfiguration of Jesus

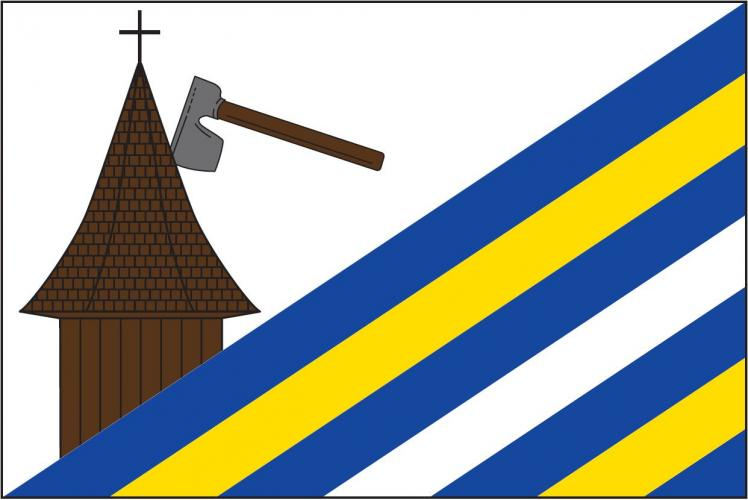
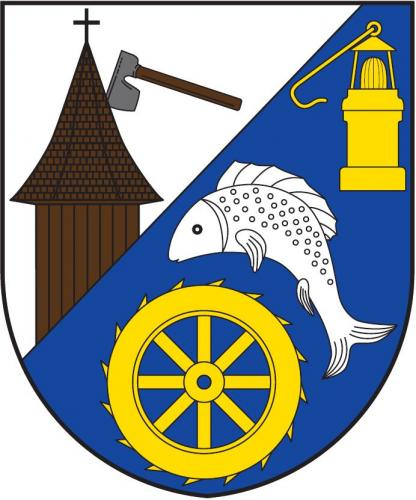
- Flag Coat of arms

- Location in the Czech Republic
- Coordinates: 50°14′19″N 16°13′31″E
- Country: Czech Republic
- Region: Hradec Králové
- District: Rychnov nad Kněžnou
- First mentioned: 1369

Area
  - Total: 13.84 km^{2} (5.34 sq mi)
- Elevation: 333 m (1,093 ft)

Population (2026-01-01)
  - Total: 755
  - Density: 54.6/km^{2} (141/sq mi)
- Time zone: UTC+1 (CET)
  - Summer (DST): UTC+2 (CEST)
- Postal code: 518 01
- Website: www.bilyujezd.cz

Bílý Újezd is a municipality and village in Rychnov nad Kněžnou District in the Hradec Králové Region of the Czech Republic. It has about 800 inhabitants.

== Administrative division ==
Bílý Újezd consists of four municipal parts (in brackets population according to the 2021 census):

- Bílý Újezd (305)
- Hroška (259)
- Masty (58)
- Roudné (68)

== Demographics ==
Historical population
Year	Pop.	±%
1869	1,336	—
1880	1,398	+4.6%
1890	1,295	−7.4%
1900	1,281	−1.1%
1910	1,207	−5.8%
1921	1,115	−7.6%
1930	990	−11.2%
1950	795	−19.7%
1961	786	−1.1%
1970	717	−8.8%
1980	673	−6.1%
1991	602	−10.5%
2001	594	−1.3%
2011	595	+0.2%
2021	690	+16.0%
Source: Censuses
