= Dedina, Serbia =

Dedina
- Village
- Location within Serbia
- Coordinates: 43°35′25″N 21°21′57″E
- Country: Serbia
- District: Rasina District
- Municipality: Kruševac

Population (2011)
  - Total: 2,887
- Time zone: UTC+1 (CET)
  - Summer (DST): UTC+2 (CEST)

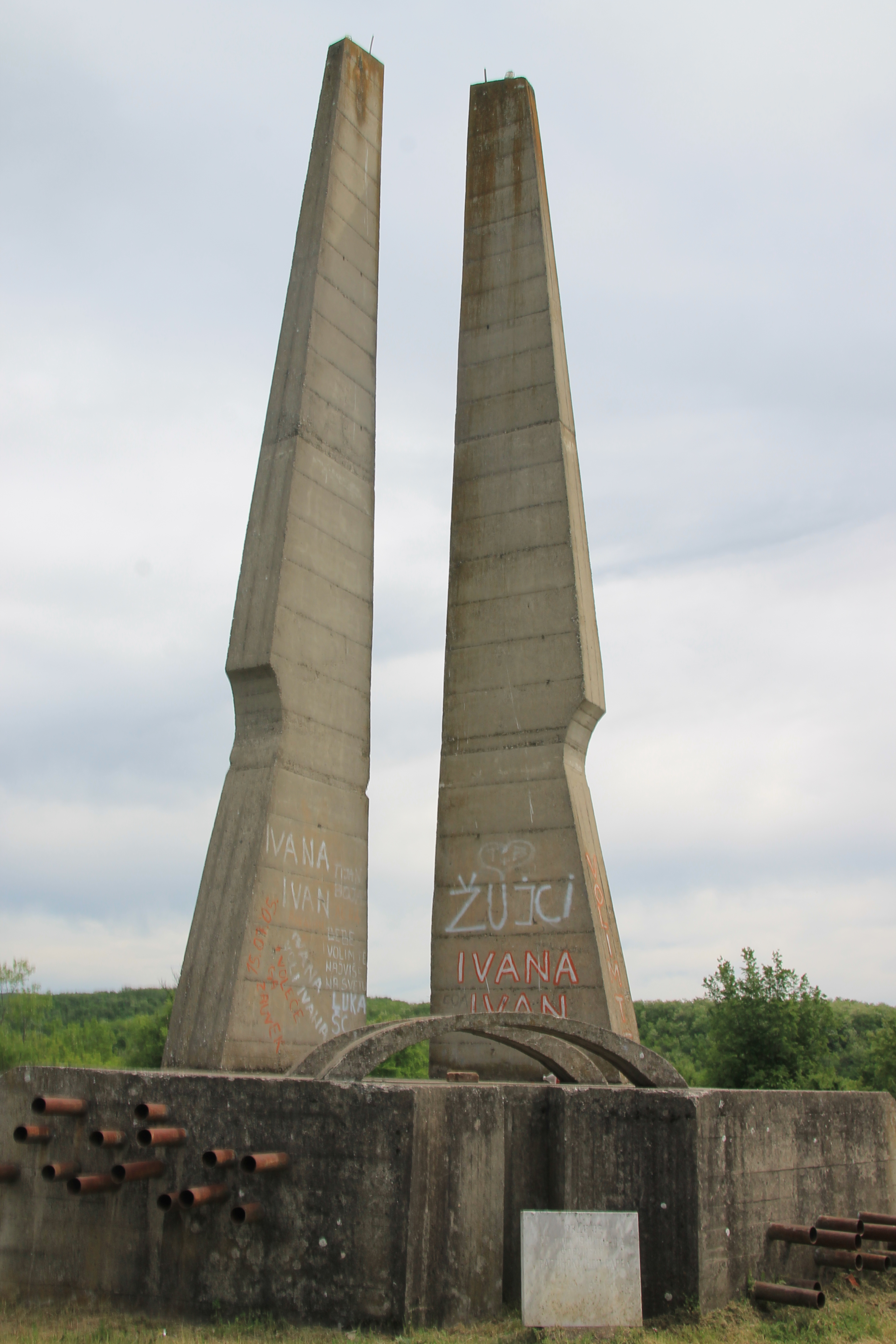
A memorial in Dedina

Dedina is a village in the municipality of Kruševac, Serbia. According to the 2002 census, the village has a population of 2775 people.
