= Bohuslavice (Náchod District) =

- Municipality
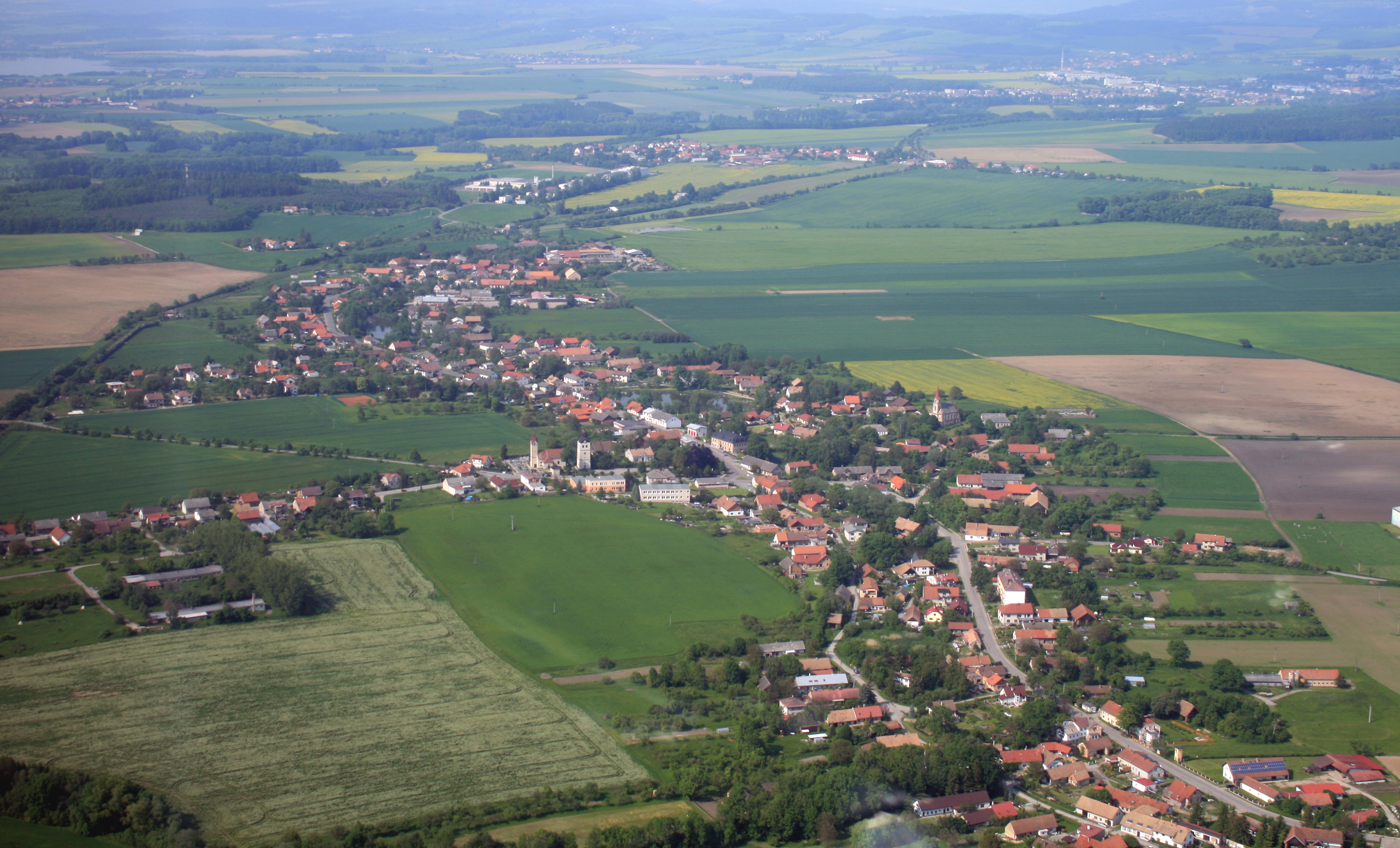
- Aerial view

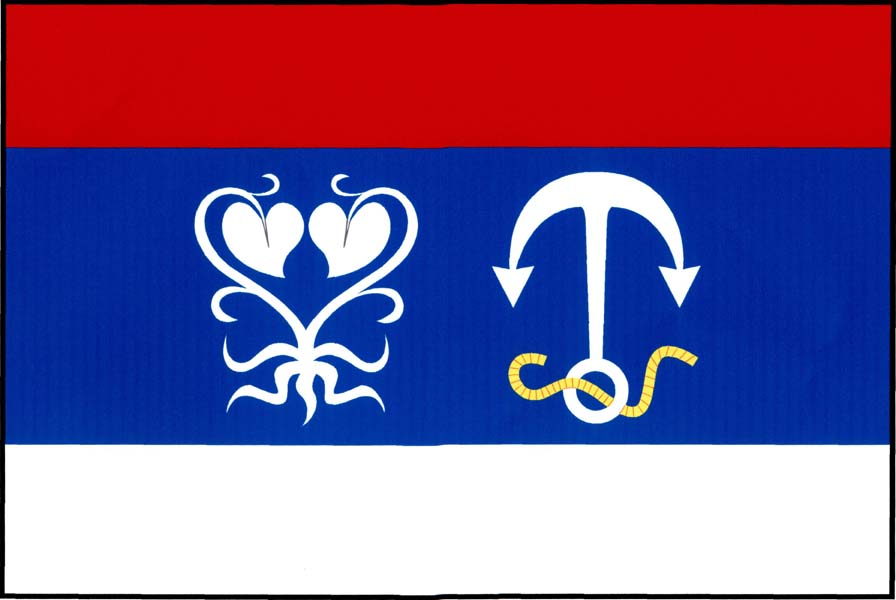
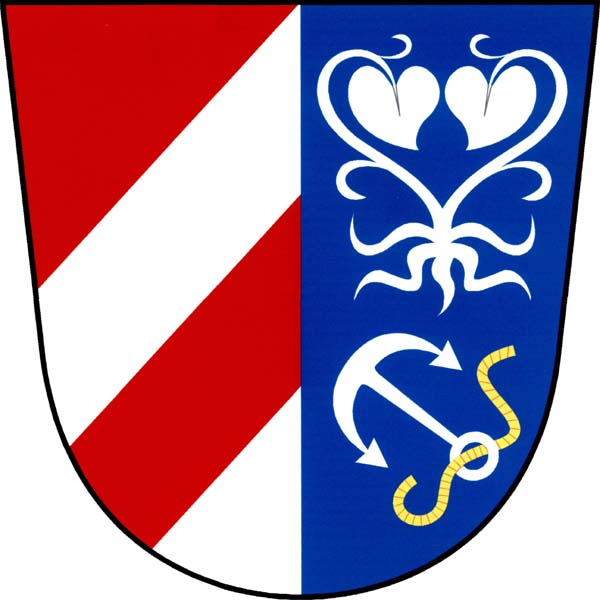
- Flag Coat of arms

- Location in the Czech Republic
- Coordinates: 50°18′46″N 16°5′19″E
- Country: Czech Republic
- Region: Hradec Králové
- District: Náchod
- First mentioned: 1361

Area
  - Total: 14.13 km^{2} (5.46 sq mi)
- Elevation: 284 m (932 ft)

Population (2026-01-01)
  - Total: 1,036
  - Density: 73.32/km^{2} (189.9/sq mi)
- Time zone: UTC+1 (CET)
  - Summer (DST): UTC+2 (CEST)
- Postal code: 549 06
- Website: www.bohuslavice.com

Bohuslavice is a municipality and village in Náchod District in the Hradec Králové Region of the Czech Republic. It has about 1,000 inhabitants.

== Demographics ==
Historical population
Year	Pop.	±%
1869	1,420	—
1880	1,589	+11.9%
1890	1,510	−5.0%
1900	1,433	−5.1%
1910	1,439	+0.4%
1921	1,417	−1.5%
1930	1,381	−2.5%
1950	1,139	−17.5%
1961	1,095	−3.9%
1970	1,031	−5.8%
1980	1,023	−0.8%
1991	888	−13.2%
2001	927	+4.4%
2011	1,000	+7.9%
2021	984	−1.6%
Source: Censuses
