= Podbřezí =

- Municipality
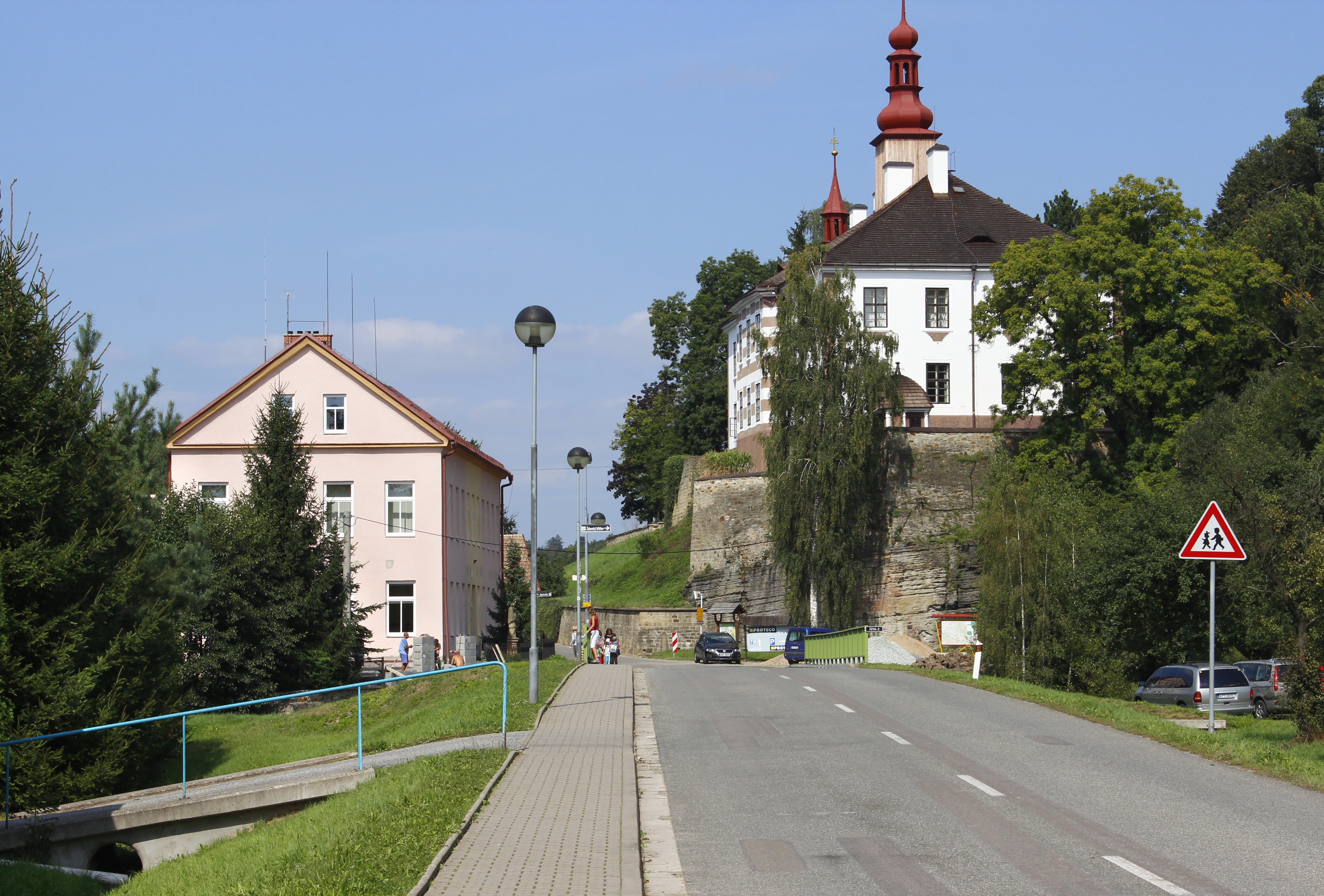
- Skalka Castle

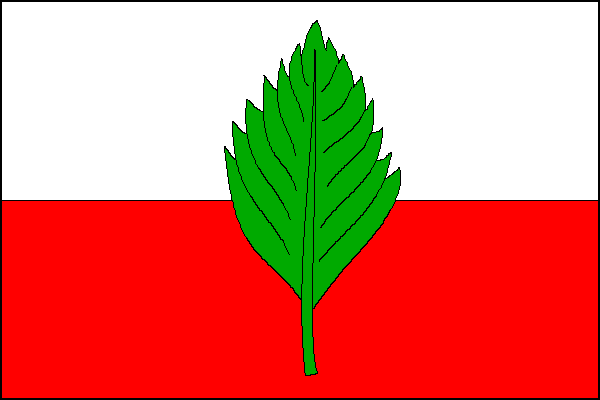
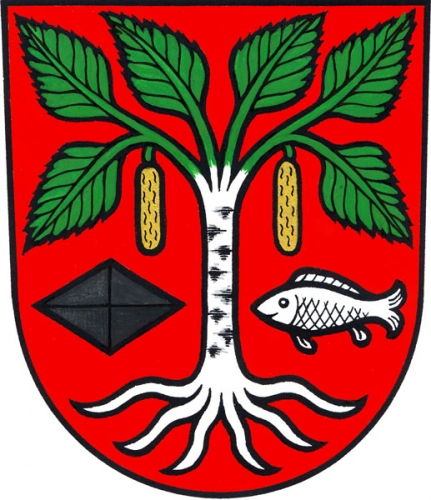
- Flag Coat of arms

- Location in the Czech Republic
- Coordinates: 50°15′36″N 16°12′53″E
- Country: Czech Republic
- Region: Hradec Králové
- District: Rychnov nad Kněžnou
- First mentioned: 1388

Area
  - Total: 7.87 km^{2} (3.04 sq mi)
- Elevation: 323 m (1,060 ft)

Population (2026-01-01)
  - Total: 618
  - Density: 78.5/km^{2} (203/sq mi)
- Time zone: UTC+1 (CET)
  - Summer (DST): UTC+2 (CEST)
- Postal code: 518 03
- Website: www.podbrezi.cz

Podbřezí is a municipality and village in Rychnov nad Kněžnou District in the Hradec Králové Region of the Czech Republic. It has about 600 inhabitants.

== Administrative division ==
Podbřezí consists of three municipal parts (in brackets population according to the 2021 census):

- Podbřezí (354)
- Chábory (50)
- Lhota Netřeba (176)

== Demographics ==
Historical population
Year	Pop.	±%
1869	1,148	—
1880	1,172	+2.1%
1890	1,075	−8.3%
1900	985	−8.4%
1910	932	−5.4%
1921	837	−10.2%
1930	790	−5.6%
1950	603	−23.7%
1961	622	+3.2%
1970	539	−13.3%
1980	515	−4.5%
1991	459	−10.9%
2001	457	−0.4%
2011	531	+16.2%
2021	580	+9.2%
Source: Censuses

== Sights ==
The main landmark of Podbřezí is the Skalka Castle. It was built in the Baroque style in 1736–1739, when the original Renaissance fortress from the end of the 16th century was completely rebuilt. It is inaccessible to the public.

A cultural monument is the Jewish cemetery with the oldest tomb being from 1725.
