= Bačetín =

- Municipality
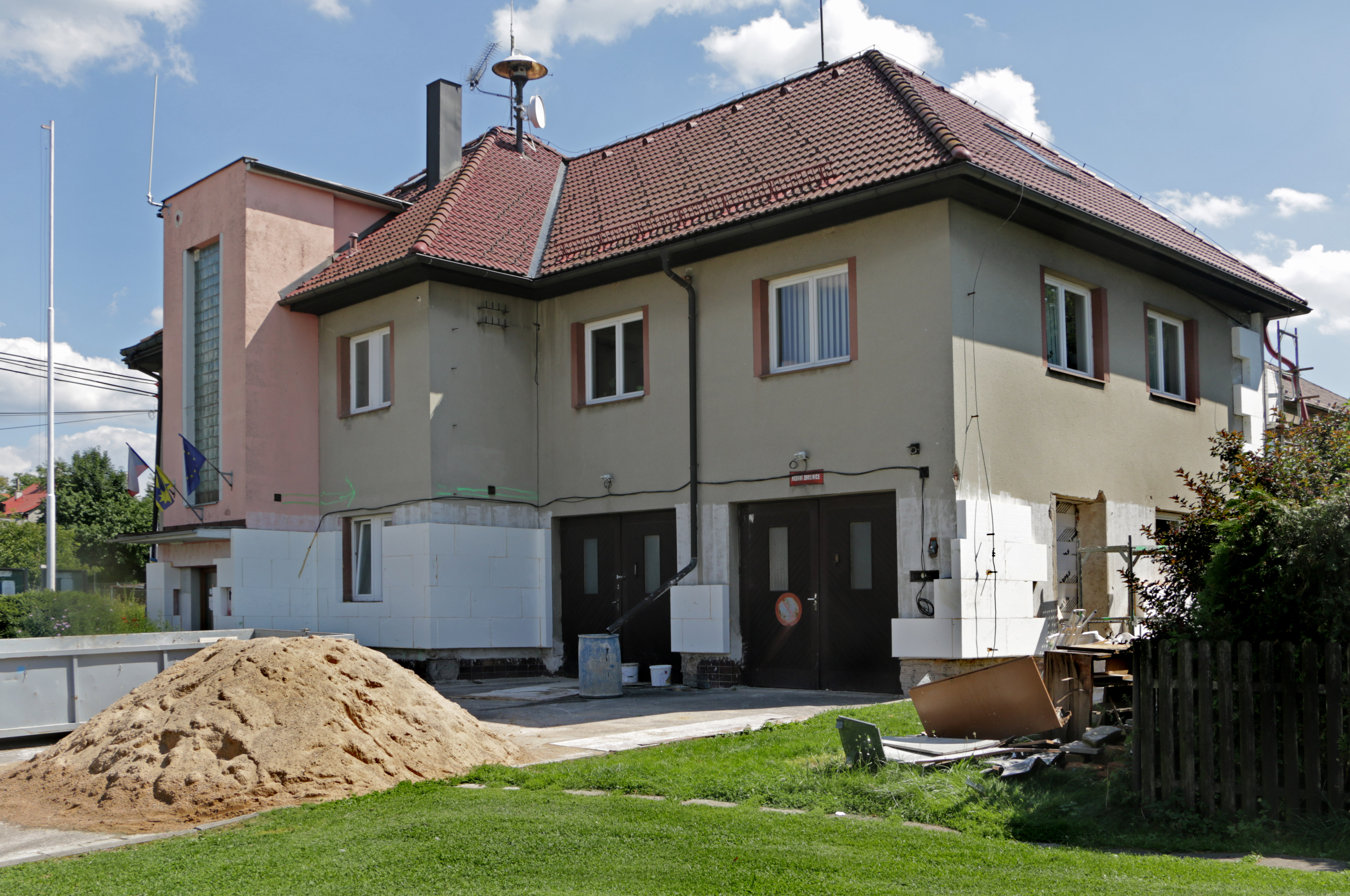
- Municipal office

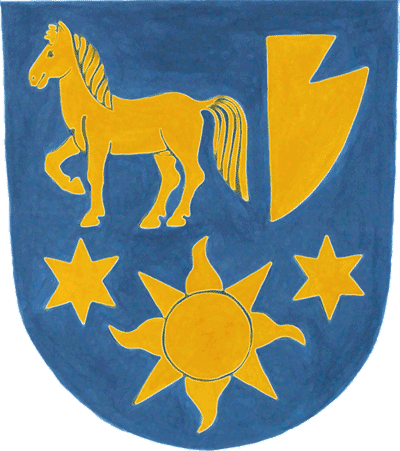
- Flag Coat of arms

- Location in the Czech Republic
- Coordinates: 50°17′59″N 16°14′0″E
- Country: Czech Republic
- Region: Hradec Králové
- District: Rychnov nad Kněžnou
- First mentioned: 1458

Area
  - Total: 8.13 km^{2} (3.14 sq mi)
- Elevation: 462 m (1,516 ft)

Population (2026-01-01)
  - Total: 391
  - Density: 48.1/km^{2} (125/sq mi)
- Time zone: UTC+1 (CET)
  - Summer (DST): UTC+2 (CEST)
- Postal code: 518 01
- Website: bacetin.cz

Bačetín is a municipality and village in Rychnov nad Kněžnou District in the Hradec Králové Region of the Czech Republic. It has about 400 inhabitants.

== Administrative division ==
Bačetín consists of two municipal parts (in brackets population according to the 2021 census):

- Bačetín (316)
- Sudín (52)

== Demographics ==
Historical population
Year	Pop.	±%
1869	623	—
1880	632	+1.4%
1890	648	+2.5%
1900	563	−13.1%
1910	577	+2.5%
1921	532	−7.8%
1930	466	−12.4%
1950	338	−27.5%
1961	328	−3.0%
1970	306	−6.7%
1980	314	+2.6%
1991	382	+21.7%
2001	383	+0.3%
2011	393	+2.6%
2021	368	−6.4%
Source: Censuses
