= Mokré =

- Municipality
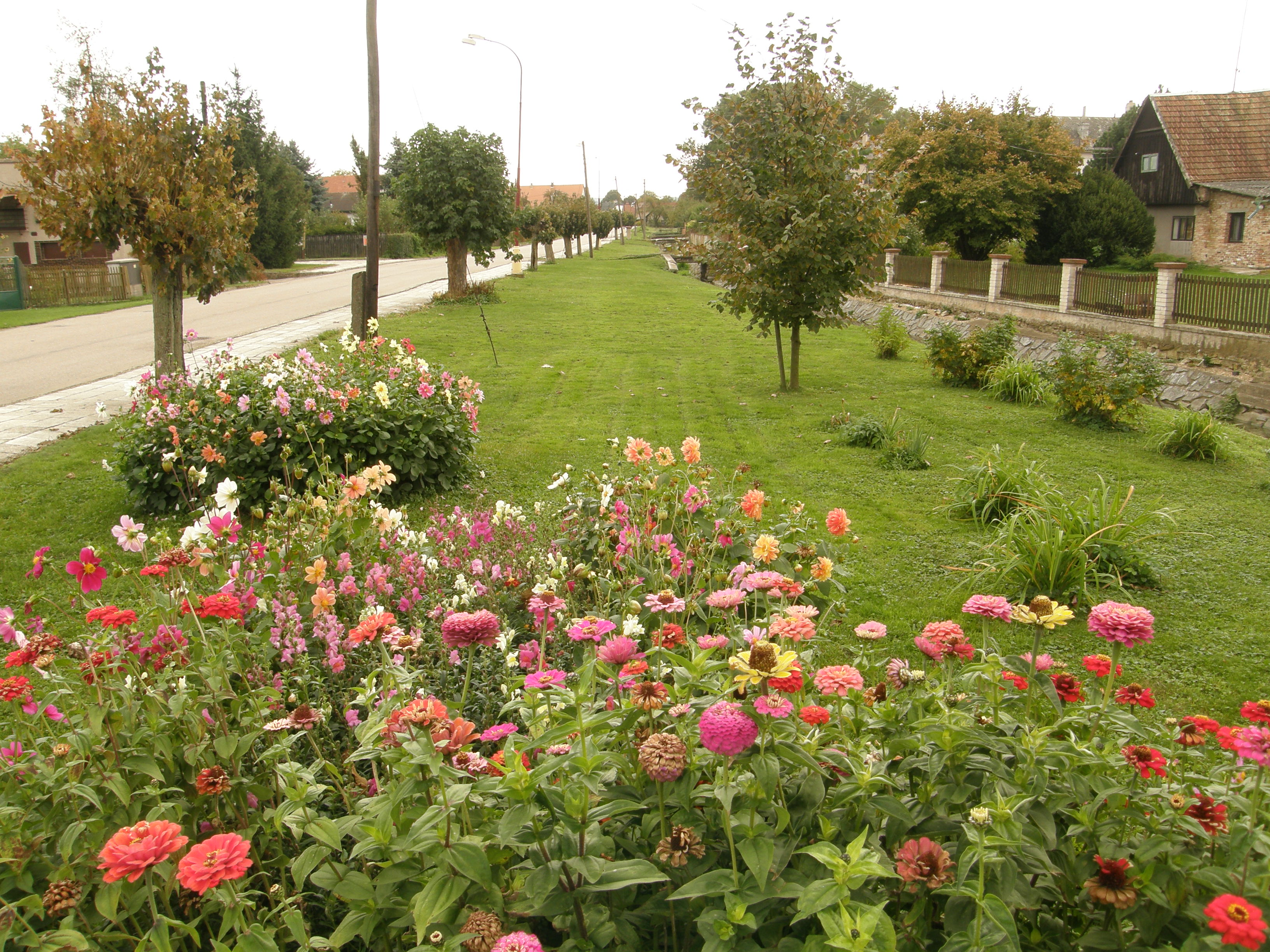
- Centre of Mokré

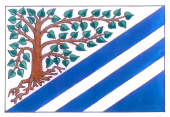
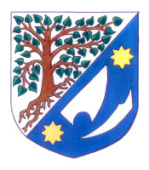
- Flag Coat of arms

- Location in the Czech Republic
- Coordinates: 50°15′33″N 16°3′59″E
- Country: Czech Republic
- Region: Hradec Králové
- District: Rychnov nad Kněžnou
- First mentioned: 1390

Area
  - Total: 5.89 km^{2} (2.27 sq mi)
- Elevation: 262 m (860 ft)

Population (2026-01-01)
  - Total: 172
  - Density: 29.2/km^{2} (75.6/sq mi)
- Time zone: UTC+1 (CET)
  - Summer (DST): UTC+2 (CEST)
- Postal code: 517 71
- Website: www.obecmokre.cz

Mokré is a municipality and village in Rychnov nad Kněžnou District in the Hradec Králové Region of the Czech Republic. It has about 200 inhabitants.

== Demographics ==
Historical population
Year	Pop.	±%
1869	374	—
1880	438	+17.1%
1890	395	−9.8%
1900	413	+4.6%
1910	436	+5.6%
1921	397	−8.9%
1930	406	+2.3%
1950	296	−27.1%
1961	297	+0.3%
1970	248	−16.5%
1980	206	−16.9%
1991	181	−12.1%
2001	164	−9.4%
2011	169	+3.0%
2021	172	+1.8%
Source: Censuses
