= Semechnice =

- Municipality
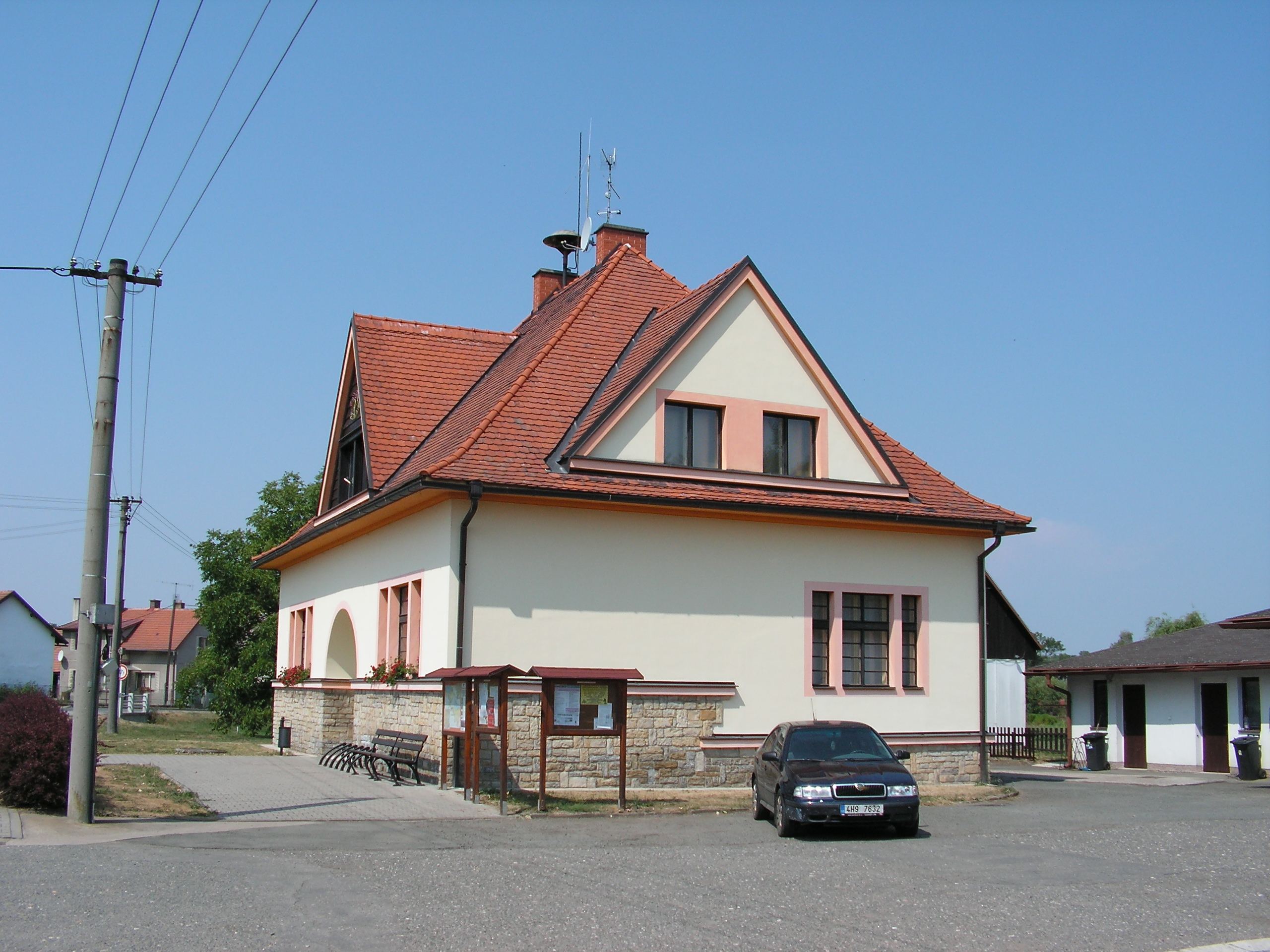
- Municipal office

- Flag Coat of arms

- Location in the Czech Republic
- Coordinates: 50°15′37″N 16°8′54″E
- Country: Czech Republic
- Region: Hradec Králové
- District: Rychnov nad Kněžnou
- First mentioned: 1364

Area
  - Total: 7.76 km^{2} (3.00 sq mi)
- Elevation: 282 m (925 ft)

Population (2026-01-01)
  - Total: 458
  - Density: 59.0/km^{2} (153/sq mi)
- Time zone: UTC+1 (CET)
  - Summer (DST): UTC+2 (CEST)
- Postal code: 518 01
- Website: www.semechnice.cz

Semechnice is a municipality and village in Rychnov nad Kněžnou District in the Hradec Králové Region of the Czech Republic. It has about 500 inhabitants.

== Administrative division ==
Semechnice consists of three municipal parts (in brackets population according to the 2021 census):

- Semechnice (388)
- Kruhovka (19)
- Podchlumí (9)

== Demographics ==
Historical population
Year	Pop.	±%
1869	692	—
1880	705	+1.9%
1890	706	+0.1%
1900	747	+5.8%
1910	707	−5.4%
1921	696	−1.6%
1930	702	+0.9%
1950	517	−26.4%
1961	489	−5.4%
1970	431	−11.9%
1980	395	−8.4%
1991	370	−6.3%
2001	368	−0.5%
2011	381	+3.5%
2021	416	+9.2%
Source: Censuses
