= Sněžné (Rychnov nad Kněžnou District) =

- Municipality
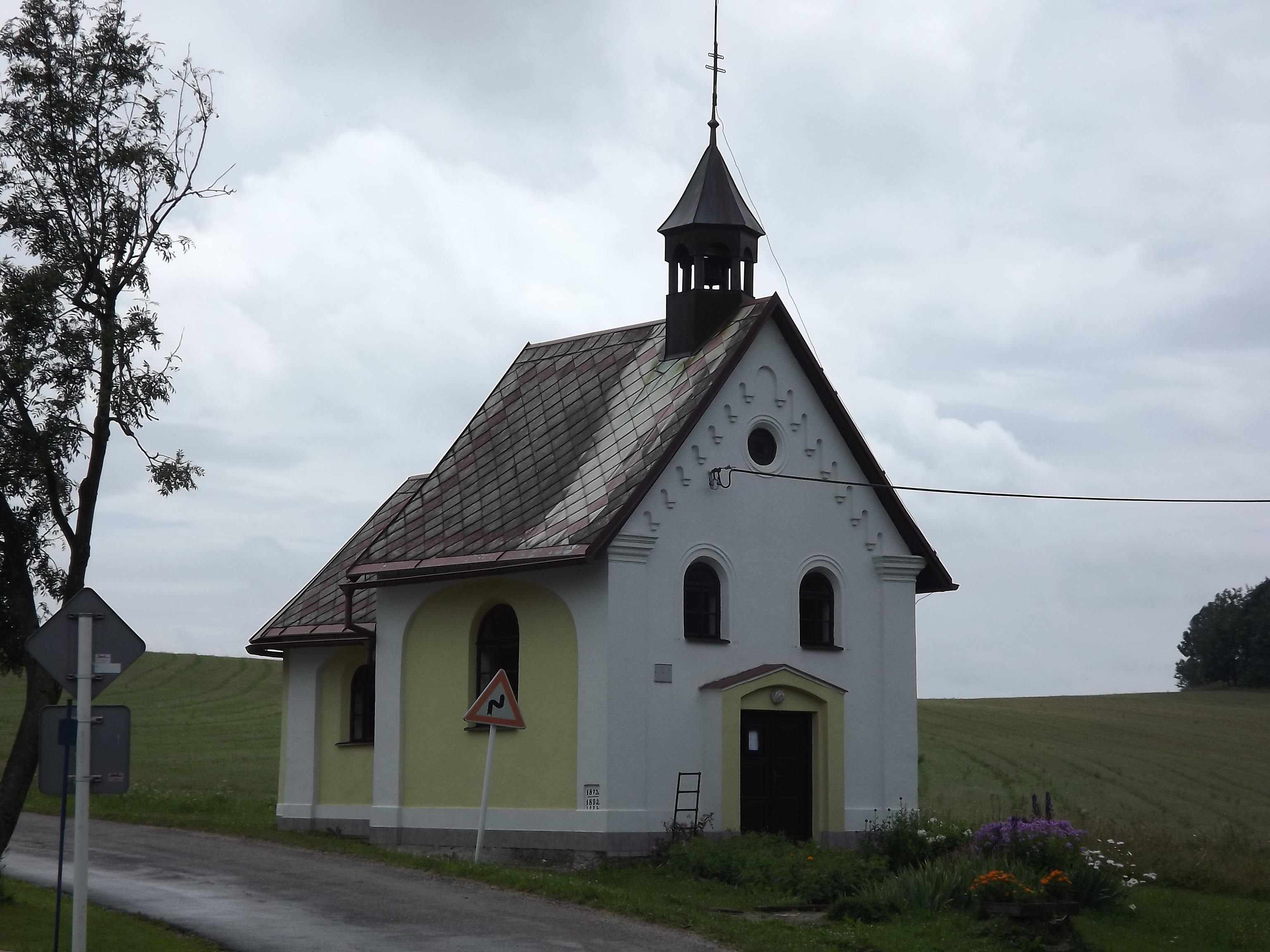
- Chapel of Our Lady of the Snows

- Flag Coat of arms

- Location in the Czech Republic
- Coordinates: 50°20′24″N 16°16′38″E
- Country: Czech Republic
- Region: Hradec Králové
- District: Rychnov nad Kněžnou
- First mentioned: 1534

Area
  - Total: 6.12 km^{2} (2.36 sq mi)
- Elevation: 610 m (2,000 ft)

Population (2026-01-01)
  - Total: 141
  - Density: 23.0/km^{2} (59.7/sq mi)
- Time zone: UTC+1 (CET)
  - Summer (DST): UTC+2 (CEST)
- Postal code: 518 01
- Website: www.snezne.net

Sněžné is a municipality and village in Rychnov nad Kněžnou District in the Hradec Králové Region of the Czech Republic. It has about 100 inhabitants.

== Demographics ==
Historical population
| Year | Pop. | ±% |
|---|---|---|
| 1869 | 710 | — |
| 1880 | 729 | +2.7% |
| 1890 | 735 | +0.8% |
| 1900 | 617 | −16.1% |
| 1910 | 608 | −1.5% |
| 1921 | 568 | −6.6% |
| 1930 | 472 | −16.9% |
| 1950 | 338 | −28.4% |
| 1961 | 305 | −9.8% |
| 1970 | 252 | −17.4% |
| 1980 | 207 | −17.9% |
| 1991 | 164 | −20.8% |
| 2001 | 142 | −13.4% |
| 2011 | 143 | +0.7% |
| 2021 | 136 | −4.9% |
Source: Censuses
