= Kounov (Rychnov nad Kněžnou District) =

- Municipality
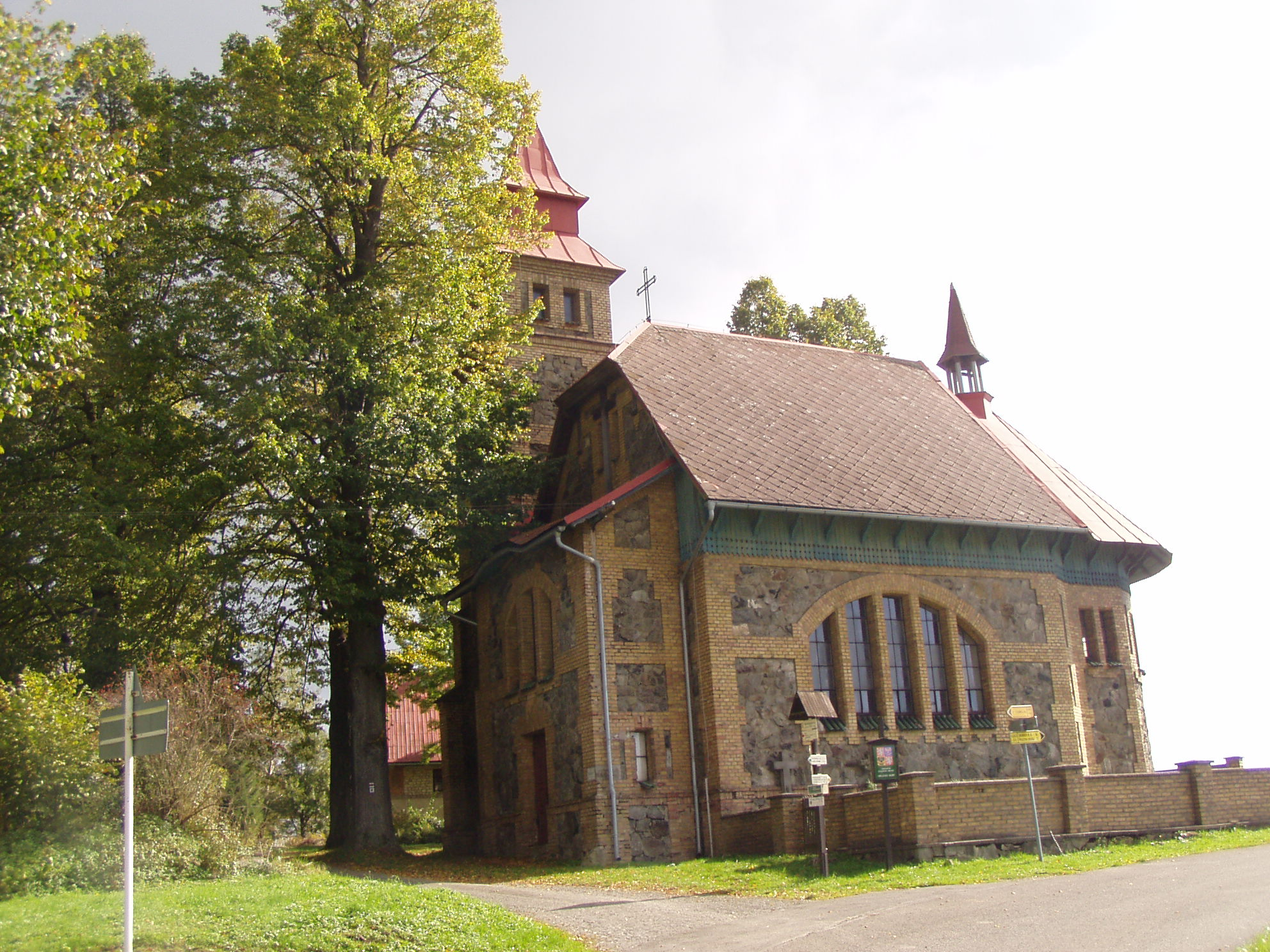
- Church of Saint Joseph

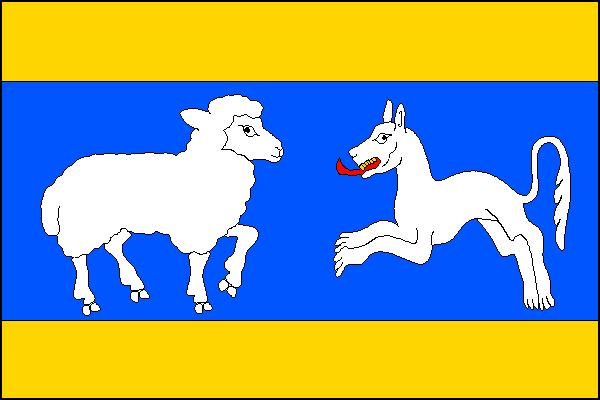
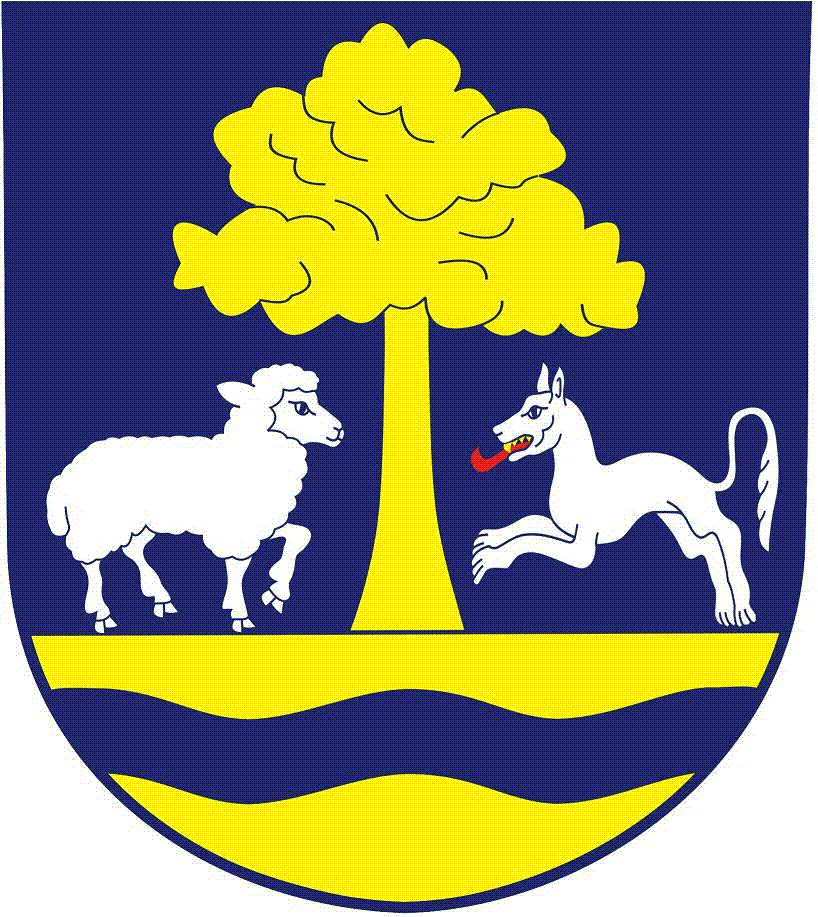
- Flag Coat of arms

- Location in the Czech Republic
- Coordinates: 50°17′56″N 16°15′29″E
- Country: Czech Republic
- Region: Hradec Králové
- District: Rychnov nad Kněžnou
- First mentioned: 1490

Area
  - Total: 11.35 km^{2} (4.38 sq mi)
- Elevation: 445 m (1,460 ft)

Population (2026-01-01)
  - Total: 239
  - Density: 21.1/km^{2} (54.5/sq mi)
- Time zone: UTC+1 (CET)
  - Summer (DST): UTC+2 (CEST)
- Postal codes: 517 92, 518 01
- Website: www.obeckounov.cz

Kounov is a municipality and village in Rychnov nad Kněžnou District in the Hradec Králové Region of the Czech Republic. It has about 200 inhabitants.

== Administrative division ==
Kounov consists of five municipal parts (in brackets population according to the 2021 census):

- Kounov (74)
- Hluky (26)
- Nedvězí (24)
- Rozkoš (75)
- Šediviny (19)

== Demographics ==
Historical population
| Year | Pop. | ±% |
|---|---|---|
| 1869 | 1,362 | — |
| 1880 | 1,367 | +0.4% |
| 1890 | 1,352 | −1.1% |
| 1900 | 1,193 | −11.8% |
| 1910 | 1,193 | +0.0% |
| 1921 | 1,085 | −9.1% |
| 1930 | 999 | −7.9% |
| 1950 | 651 | −34.8% |
| 1961 | 574 | −11.8% |
| 1970 | 449 | −21.8% |
| 1980 | 338 | −24.7% |
| 1991 | 270 | −20.1% |
| 2001 | 220 | −18.5% |
| 2011 | 222 | +0.9% |
| 2021 | 218 | −1.8% |
Source: Censuses
