= Divoká Orlice =

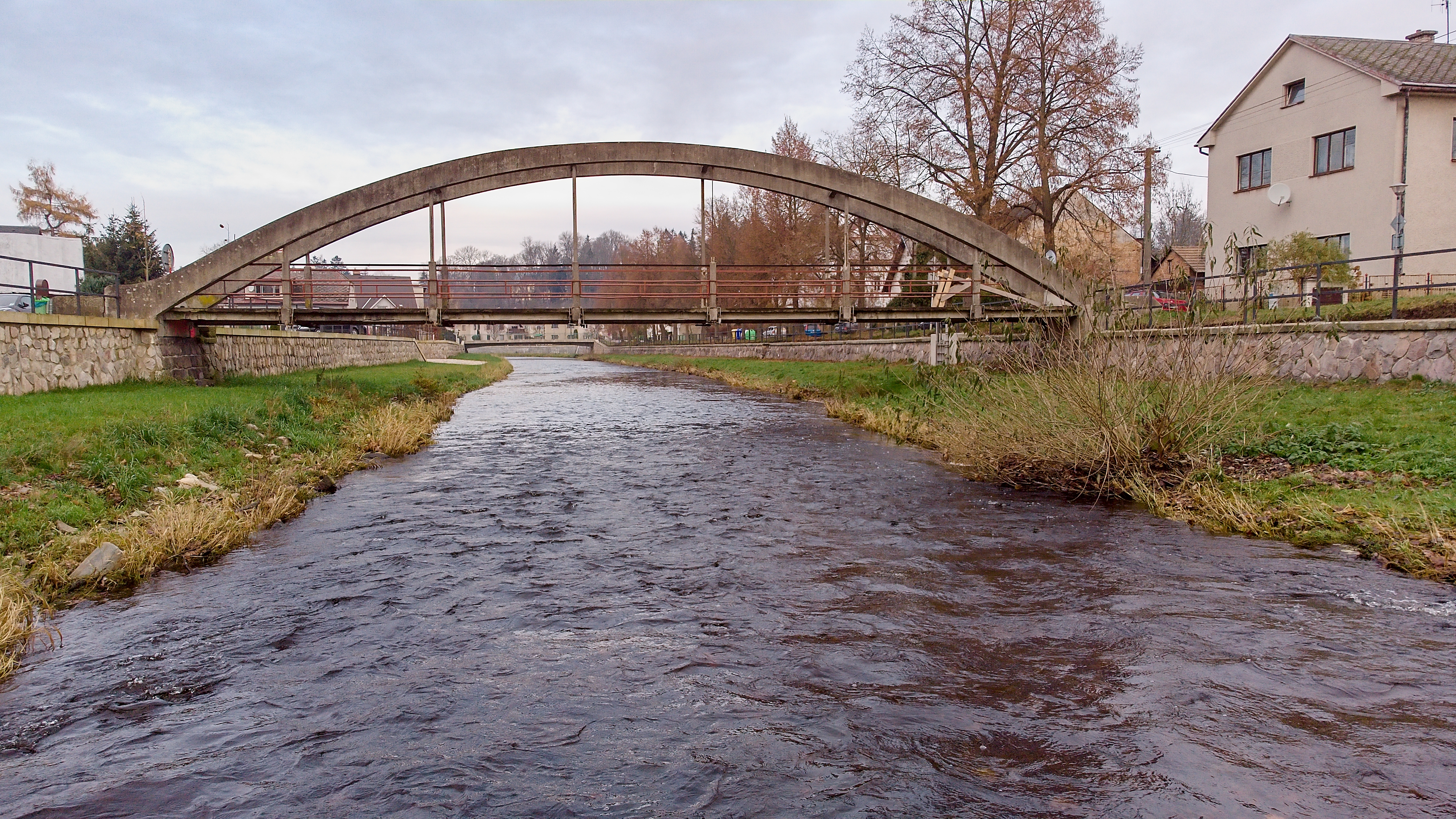
- The Divoká Orlice in Žamberk

Location
- Countries: Czech Republic; Poland
- Regions/ Voivodeships: Hradec Králové; Pardubice; Lower Silesian

Physical characteristics
- Source
  - location: Szczytna, Bystrzyckie Mountains
  - coordinates: 50°21′29″N 16°26′6″E
  - elevation: 802 m (2,631 ft)
- Mouth
  - location: Orlice
  - coordinates: 50°21′30″N 16°26′5″E
  - elevation: 249 m (817 ft)
- Length: 99.3 km (61.7 mi)
- Basin size: 806.5 km^{2} (311.4 sq mi)
- Discharge
  - average: 11.5 m^{3}/s (410 cu ft/s) near estuary

Basin features
- Progression: Orlice→ Elbe→ North Sea

The Divoká Orlice (Czech pronunciation: [ˈɟɪvokaː ˈorlɪtsɛ]; Polish: Dzika Orlica, German: Wilde Adler) is a river in the Czech Republic and Poland. It flows through Lower Silesian Voivodeship in Poland and through the Hradec Králové and Pardubice regions. It is the upper and middle course of the Orlice, but usually it is considered a separate river. Until its confluence with the Tichá Orlice, when it further continues as the Orlice, the Divoká Orlice is 99.3 km (61.7 mi) long.

== Etymology ==
The name Orlice is derived from the Slavic word orel, i.e. 'eagle' (literally "female eagle"). The river probably got its name from the abundance of eagles, but it could also have just been the accidental catch of an eagle. The attribute divoká means 'wild' and refers to its character (compared to Tichá Orlice, i.e. "silent Orlice"). The Divoká Orlice was also called Dravá Orlice (i.e. 'ferocious', 'fierce').

== Characteristic ==
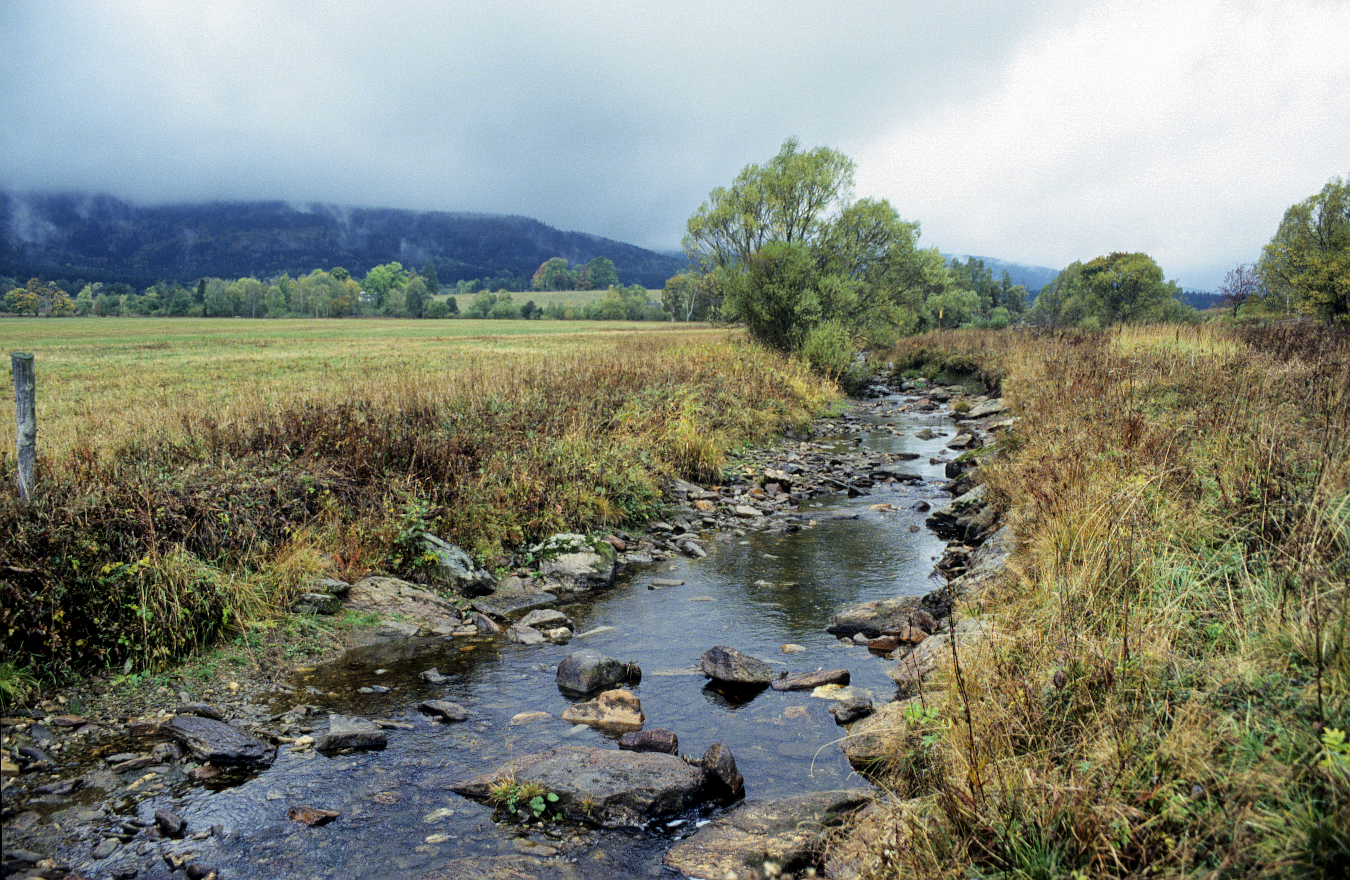
The upper course at Lasówka

From a water management point of view, the Orlice and Divoká Orlice are two different rivers with separate numbering of river kilometres. The Divoká Orlice originates in the territory of Szczytna in the Bystrzyckie Mountains at an elevation of 802 m (2,631 ft) and then flows to Žďár nad Orlicí, where it merges with the Tichá Orlice River at an elevation of 249 m (817 ft) and continues as Orlice. It is 99.3 km (61.7 mi) long, of which 3.2 km (2.0 mi) (excluding the Czech–Polish border) is in Poland. It forms the state boundary for a distance of 29.5 km (18.3 mi) and separates the Bystrzyckie Mountains and Orlické Mountains. Its drainage basin has an area of 806.5 km^{2} (311.4 sq mi), of which 705.9 km^{2} (272.5 sq mi) is in the Czech Republic.

The longest tributaries of the Divoká Orlice are:

Tributary	Length (km)	River km	Side
Bělá	40.6	12.3	right
Zdobnice	33.9	21.7	right
Brodec	19.8	8.1	left
Rokytenka	19.0	44.8	right

== Flow ==
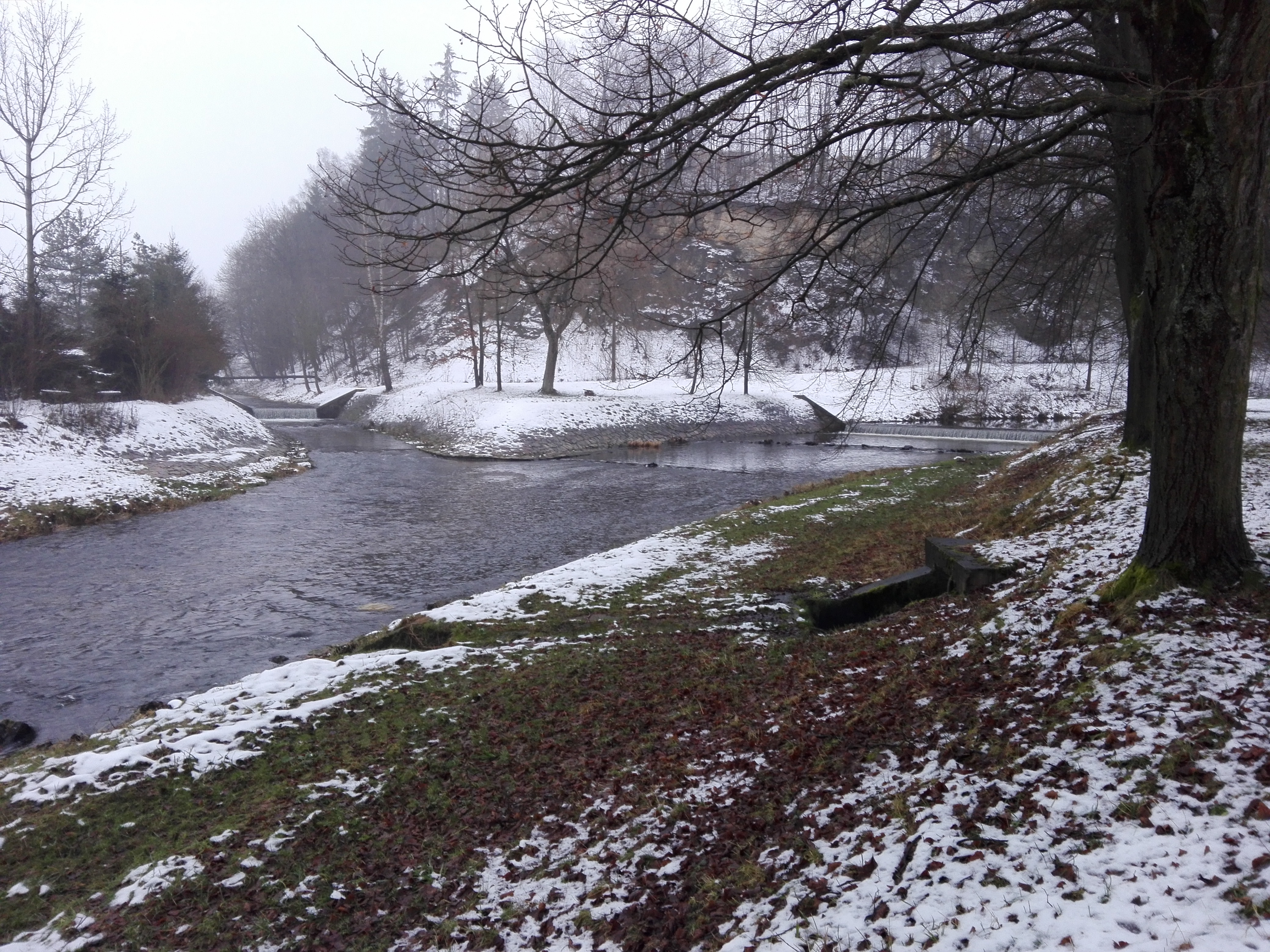
Confluence of the Divoká Orlice and Rokytenka

The river flows through the territories of the gminas Szczytna, Bystrzyca Kłodzka and Międzylesie in Poland and through the municipal territories of Orlické Záhoří, Bartošovice v Orlických horách, Klášterec nad Orlicí, Pastviny, Nekoř, Líšnice, Žamberk, Helvíkovice, Záchlumí, Potštejn, Záměl, Doudleby nad Orlicí, Kostelec nad Orlicí, Častolovice, Čestice, Lípa nad Orlicí and Žďár nad Orlicí in the Czech Republic.

== Bodies of water ==
There are 376 bodies of water in the basin area. The largest of them is Pastviny I Reservoir with an area of 63 ha (160 acres), built directly on the Divoká Orlice.

== Tourism ==
The Divoká Orlice is suitable for river tourism and belongs to the rivers suitable for less experienced paddlers.

== See also ==
- List of rivers of the Czech Republic
- List of rivers of Poland
