= Zemská brána =

Coordinates: 50.1357°N 16.5724°E

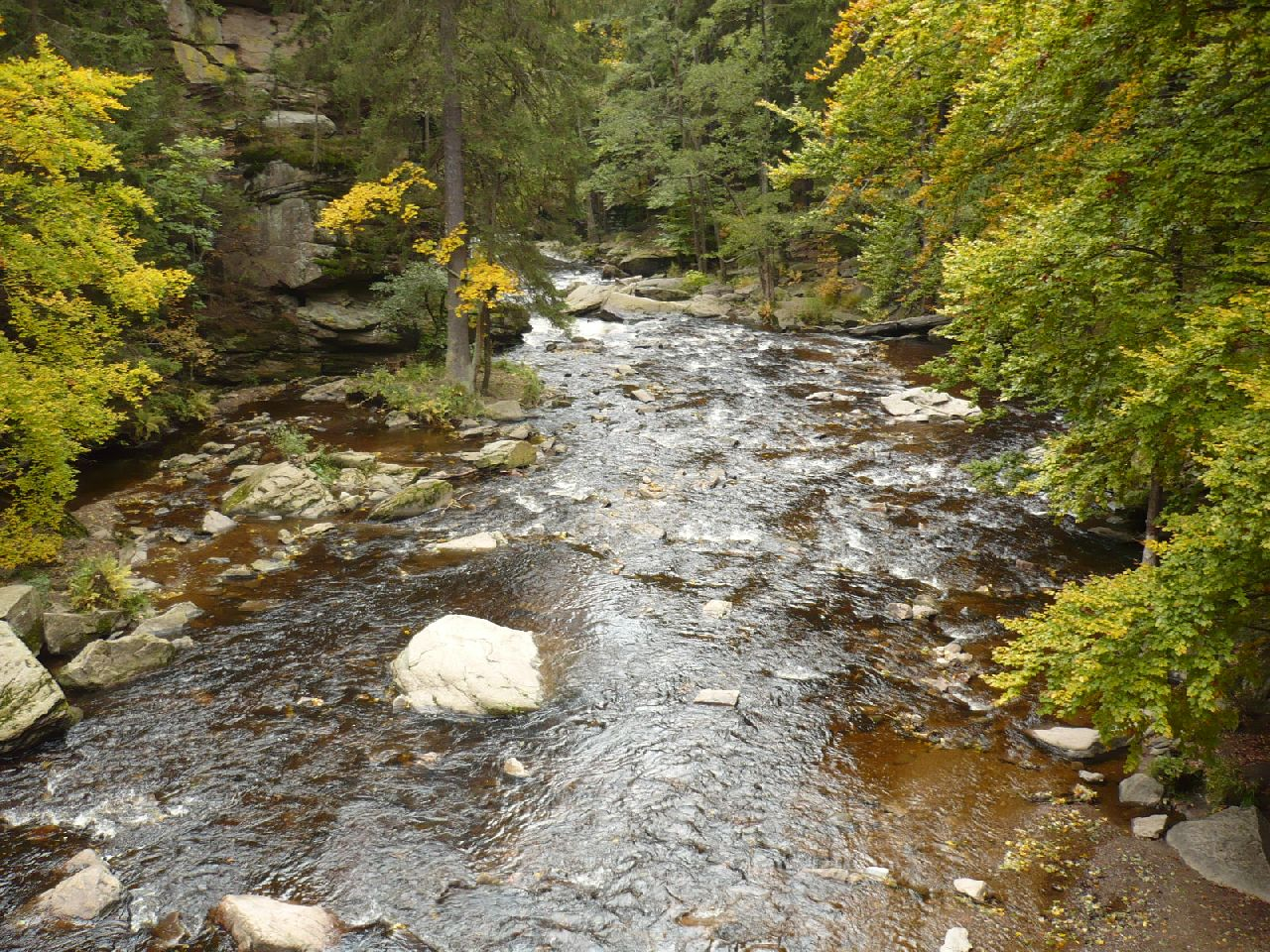
Zemská brána from the stone bridge

Zemská brána (English: 'Land's Gate') is a valley and a nature reserve in the Orlické Mountains in the Czech Republic. It is located around the Divoká Orlice River in the territory of Klášterec nad Orlicí and Bartošovice v Orlických horách in the Hradec Králové Region, near the Czech–Polish border.

It is a rocky valley carved by the river, offering a remarkable environment of forests. At the beginning of the valley there is a stone bridge. Zemská brána was declared a nature reserve in 1987.

== Natural trail ==
A three-kilometre long natural trail starts at the stone bridge. It has about 22 stops. This trail is suitable even for small children due to its low intensity. The purpose of this trail is hiking and learning about local nature.

== Stone bridge ==
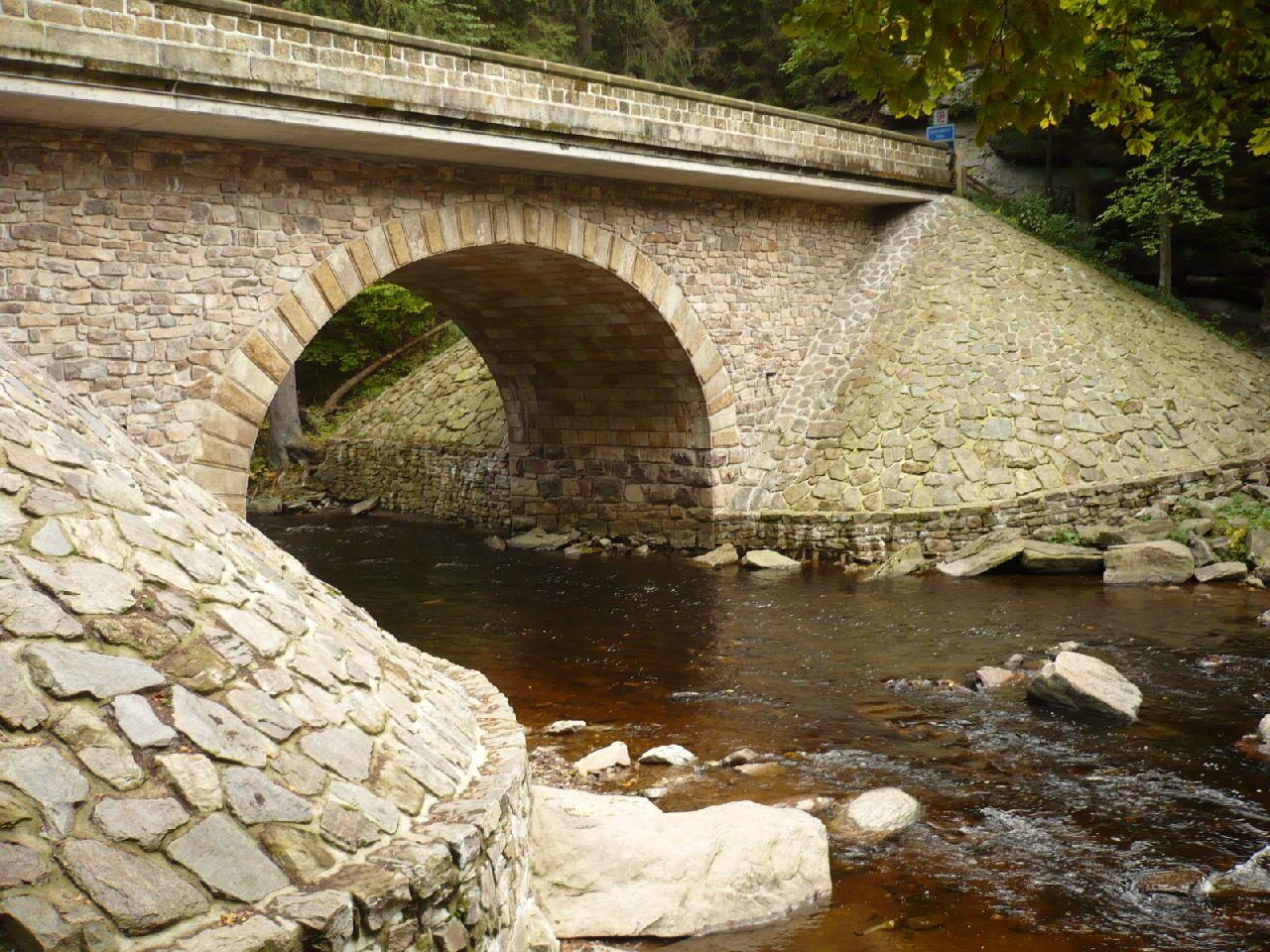
The stone bridge

The natural trail starts at the stone bridge which is considered the main dominant of the nature reserve Zemská brána. It was built between the years of 1901-1903 by Italian workers. The bridge was reconstructed in 2004, but the original appearance has not been changed.

== Pašerácká lávka ==
Across the river there is the bridge called Pašerácká lávka ('Smugglers' footbridge'). Previously, it was used for smuggling. After the floods in 1999, the bridge was rebuilt and currently it is built of wood.

== Lusthaus hunting lodge ==
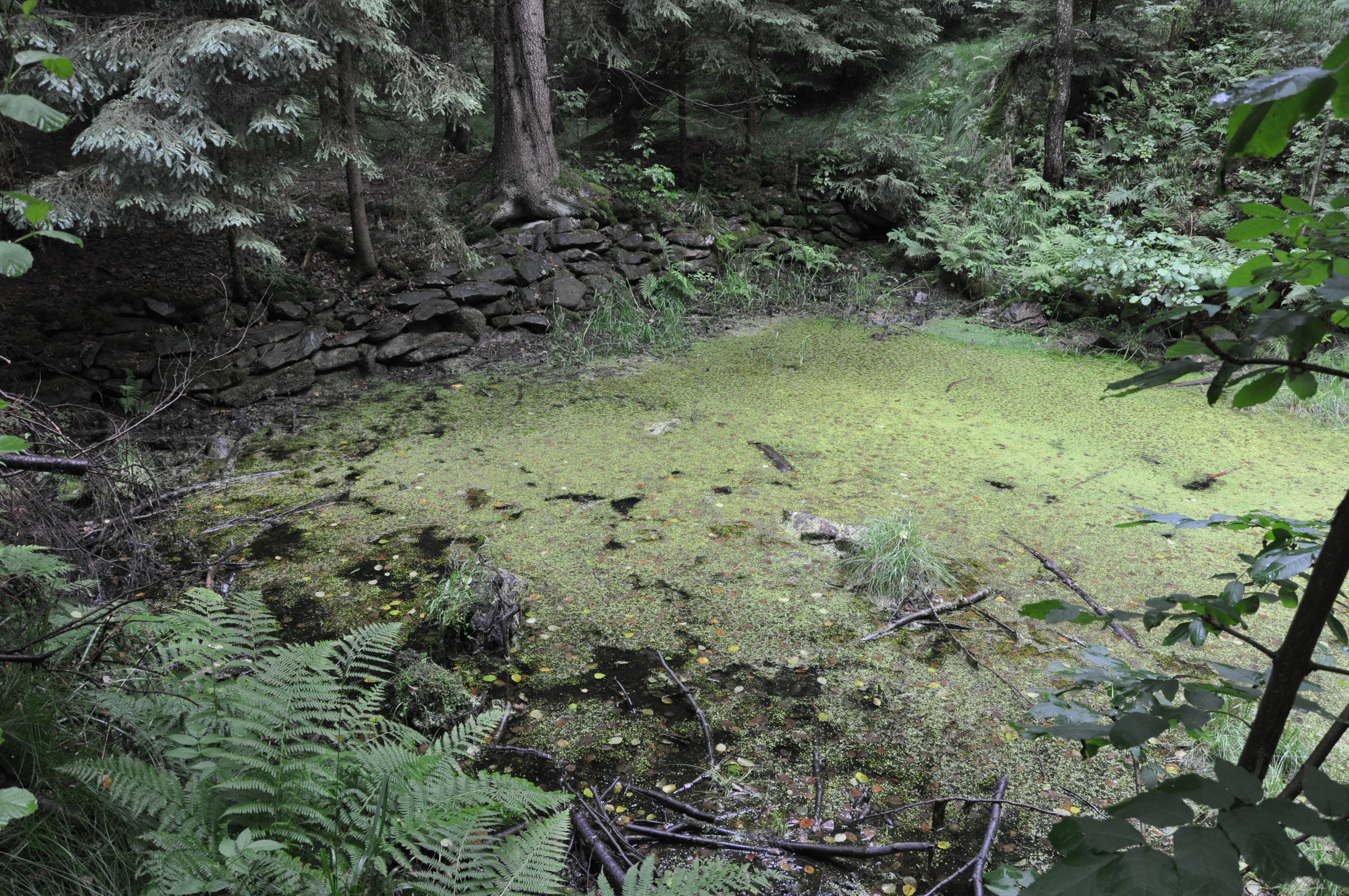
The hunting lodge Lusthaus

Not far from the Pášerácká lávka the Empire style hunting lodge Lusthaus was built. It was built by František Adam Bubna in 1806. Later, it was used as a lodge. In 1936 it burnt down and was never rebuilt. Today there are just two ponds and a yew.

== Ledříčkova skála ==
Above the right bank of the river Divoká Orlice there is a 60 metres high rock called Ledříčkova skála ('Ledříček's rock'). In its lower part there is a 20 meters high vertical wall with a clearly visible cave. This cave is associated with the legend of a robber of the Orlické Mountains called Ledříček. He took from the rich and gave to the poor. He was caught several times, but each time he managed to escape. One day, he tried to hide himself in his secret place, but the rope broke with him and he fell off a cliff and killed himself.
