= Neratov =

Neratov may refer to:

== Places in the Czech Republic ==
- Neratov (Pardubice District), a municipality and village in the Pardubice Region
- Neratov (Bartošovice v Orlických horách), a hamlet and former municipality in the Hradec Králové Region

== People ==
- Anatoly Neratov, Russian diplomat
