= Čestice =

Čestice may refer to places in the Czech Republic:

- Čestice (Rychnov nad Kněžnou District), a municipality and village in the Hradec Králové Region
- Čestice (Strakonice District), a market town in the South Bohemian Region

== See also ==
- Čestlice
