= Al-Zamel =

Al-Zamel (Arabic: الزامل) is a surname. Notable people with the surname include:

- Adel al-Zamel (born 1963), Kuwaiti Guantanamo prisoner
- Ghassan al-Zamel (born 1963), Syrian politician

== See also ==
- Záměl
