= Neratov (Bartošovice v Orlických horách) =

- Hamlet
- view from southeast

- Location in Czech Republic
- Coordinates: 50°12′54″N 16°33′1″E
- Country: Czech Republic
- Region: Hradec Králové
- District: Rychnov nad Kněžnou
- Municipality: Bartošovice v Orlických horách
- First mentioned: 1550
- Elevation: 650 m (2,130 ft)
- Postal code: 517 61

Neratov (German: Bärnwald) is a hamlet in Bartošovice v Orlických horách in Rychnov nad Kněžnou District of the Hradec Králové Region of the Czech Republic. Before World War II, it was a separate municipality with its own administrative area.

== History ==
The first written mention of Neratov dates from 1550, when its emergence coincided with a burgeoning glassworks, which arose in the late 15th century in connection with the German colonization of the Orlické Mountains. Just prior to World War II, the alpine village had several hundred residents.

After the Expulsion of Germans from Czechoslovakia, which occurred after World War II in 1945-1946, the community almost disappeared. In 1989, Neratov had only two permanent residents.

In 1992, local priest Josef Suchár of Church of the Assumption of the Virgin Mary, a Baroque church built between 1723 and 1733, founded the Neratov Association with the aim of restoring the village by concomitantly establishing a living community for mentally disabled adults from throughout the country. In 2016 the erstwhile Neratov section of municipal Bartošovice v Orlických horách was home to about 60 permanent residents and was otherwise filled during winter and summer months with cottagers and vacationers.

Neratov has become one of Czech Republic's three largest employers of mentally challenged persons. Key among sources of that employment are local gardening needs and the manufacture of baked goods shipped daily to Prague. Says Father Suchár in 2017, "We offer assembly operations work to people with mental disabilities, and a brewery is on its way." Moreover, Suchár is understood to have transformed the obscure bygone village into a tourist attraction. In 2018, Neratov's first microbrewery began operations.

== Bridge to Poland ==
In December 2019, a new footbridge connecting Neratov to neighbouring Poland over the Divoká Orlice river was constructed, restoring an historic pilgrimage route. The bridge, more than twenty meters long and two and a half meters wide, is anchored on concrete pillars. A stone bridge at this location was built in 1618, followed by a reconstruction in 1730 and an unfinished restoration in 1932. After World War II the existing bridge was dismantled, leaving Neratov unbridged from Poland for nearly 75 years.

== Gallery ==
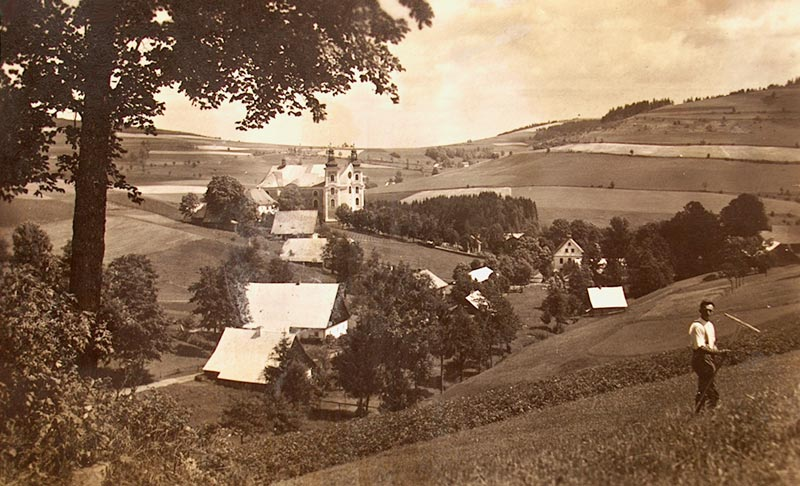
Neratov in 1921

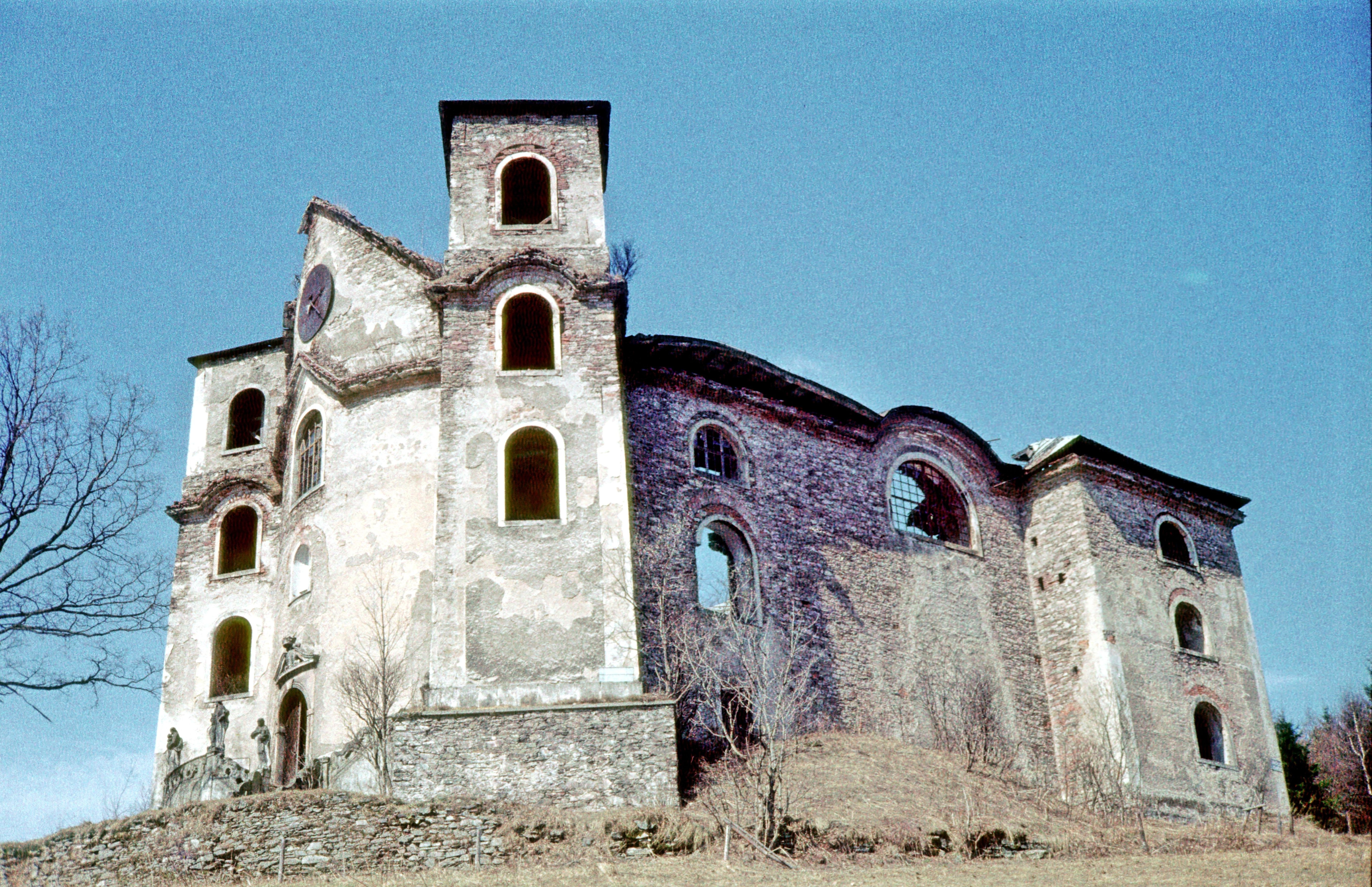
Church of the Assumption of the Virgin Mary, c. 1970s

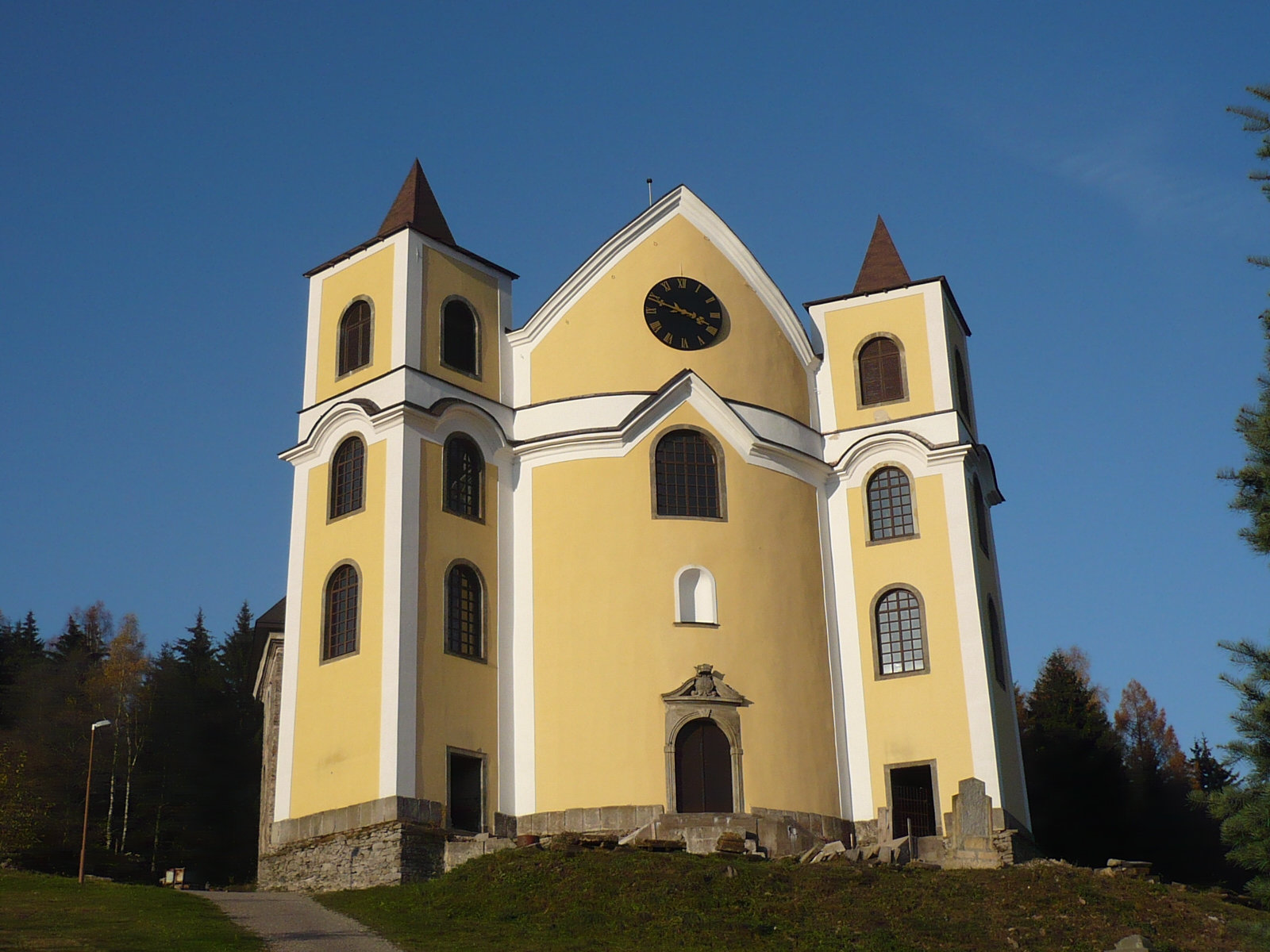
Facade, Church of the Assumption of the Virgin Mary, 2009

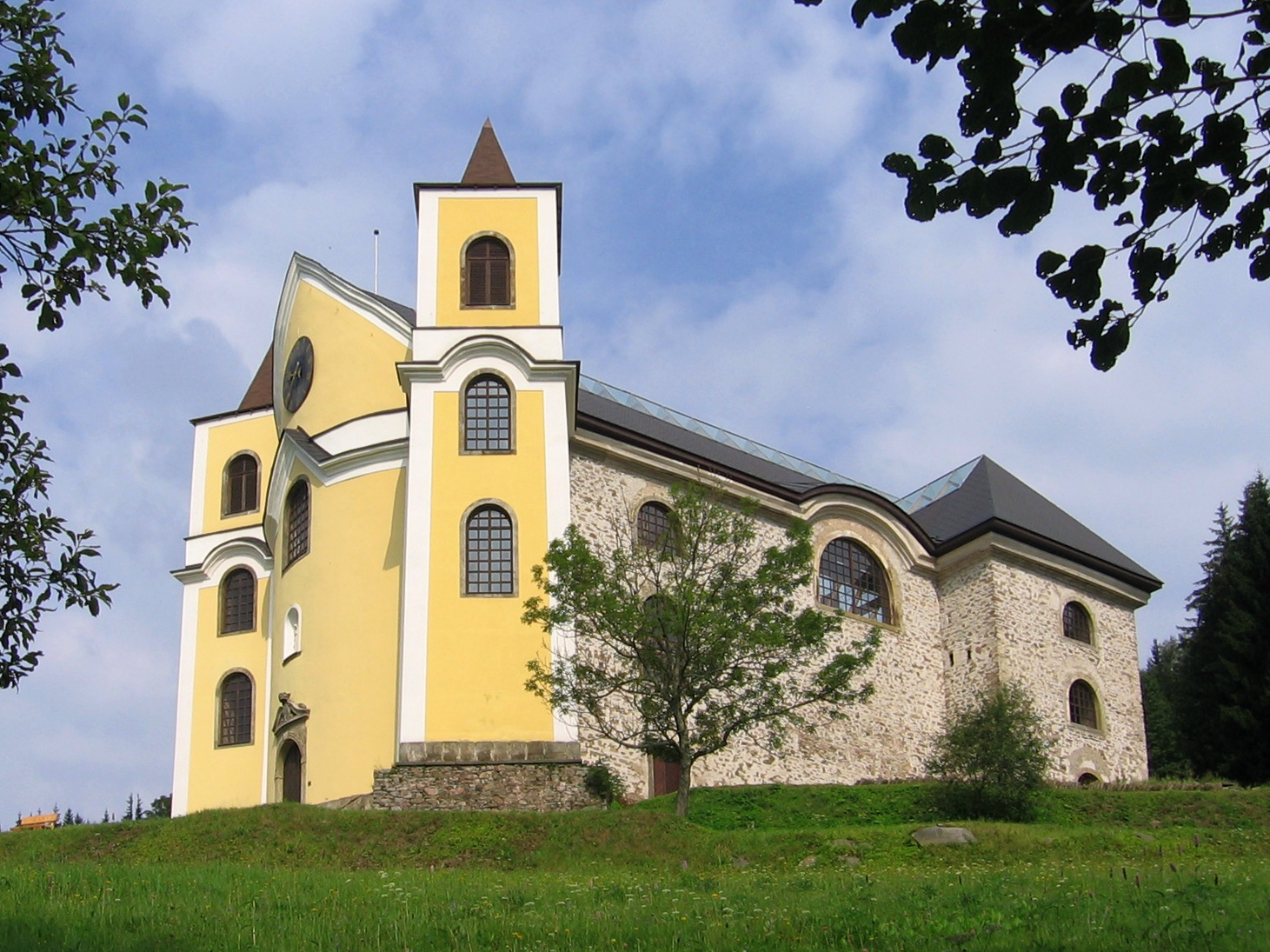
Church of the Assumption of the Virgin Mary, 2014

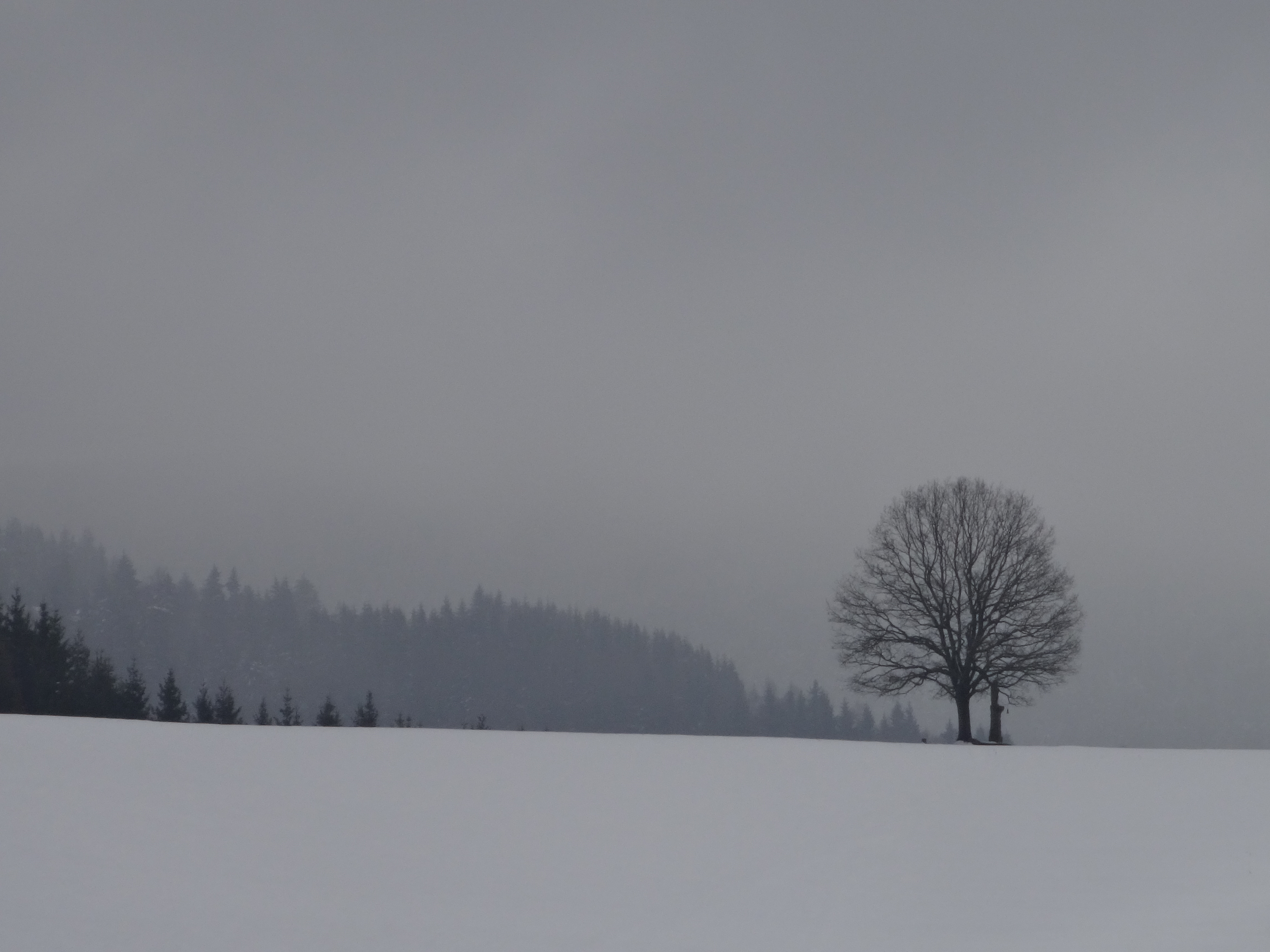
Neratov countryside, 2016
