= Klösterle =

Klösterle may refer to:

- Klášterec nad Ohří, a town in the Czech Republic known in German as Klösterle an der Eger
- Klášterec nad Orlicí, a village in the Czech Republic known in German as Klösterle an der Adler
- Klösterle, Austria, a town in the district of Bludenz in Vorarlberg in Austria
