= Lípa nad Orlicí =

- Municipality
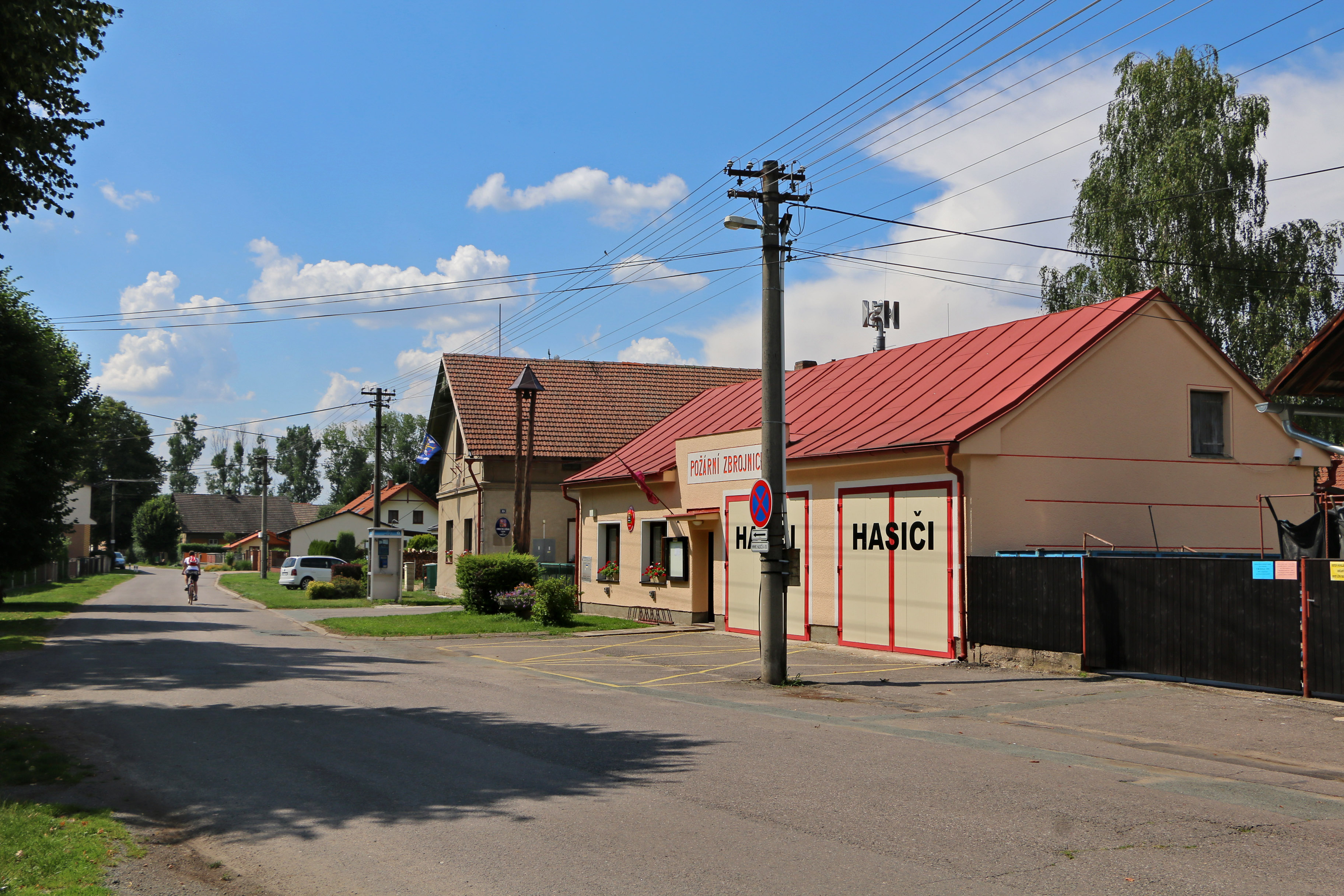
- Fire house

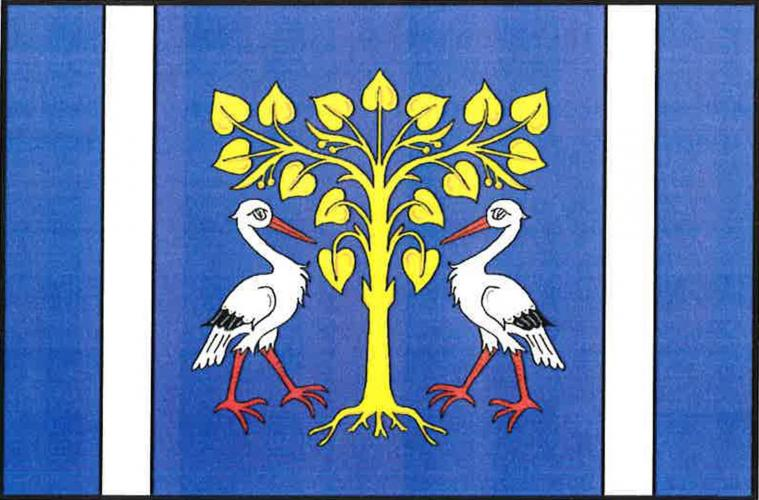
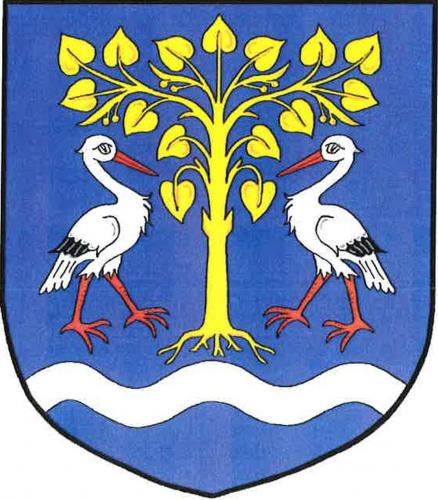
- Flag Coat of arms

- Location in the Czech Republic
- Coordinates: 50°8′8″N 16°5′53″E
- Country: Czech Republic
- Region: Hradec Králové
- District: Rychnov nad Kněžnou
- First mentioned: 1396

Area
  - Total: 10.57 km^{2} (4.08 sq mi)
- Elevation: 252 m (827 ft)

Population (2026-01-01)
  - Total: 647
  - Density: 61.2/km^{2} (159/sq mi)
- Time zone: UTC+1 (CET)
  - Summer (DST): UTC+2 (CEST)
- Postal code: 517 21
- Website: www.lipanadorlici.cz

Lípa nad Orlicí is a municipality and village in Rychnov nad Kněžnou District in the Hradec Králové Region of the Czech Republic. It has about 600 inhabitants.

== Administrative division ==
Lípa nad Orlicí consists of two municipal parts (in brackets population according to the 2021 census):

- Lípa nad Orlicí (526)
- Dlouhá Louka (52)

== History ==
The first written mention of Lípa nad Orlicí is from 1396.

== Demographics ==
Historical population
Year	Pop.	±%
1869	600	—
1880	572	−4.7%
1890	541	−5.4%
1900	561	+3.7%
1910	534	−4.8%
1921	557	+4.3%
1930	553	−0.7%
1950	585	+5.8%
1961	569	−2.7%
1970	535	−6.0%
1980	461	−13.8%
1991	419	−9.1%
2001	428	+2.1%
2011	503	+17.5%
2021	578	+14.9%
Source: Censuses
