= Žďár nad Orlicí =

- Municipality
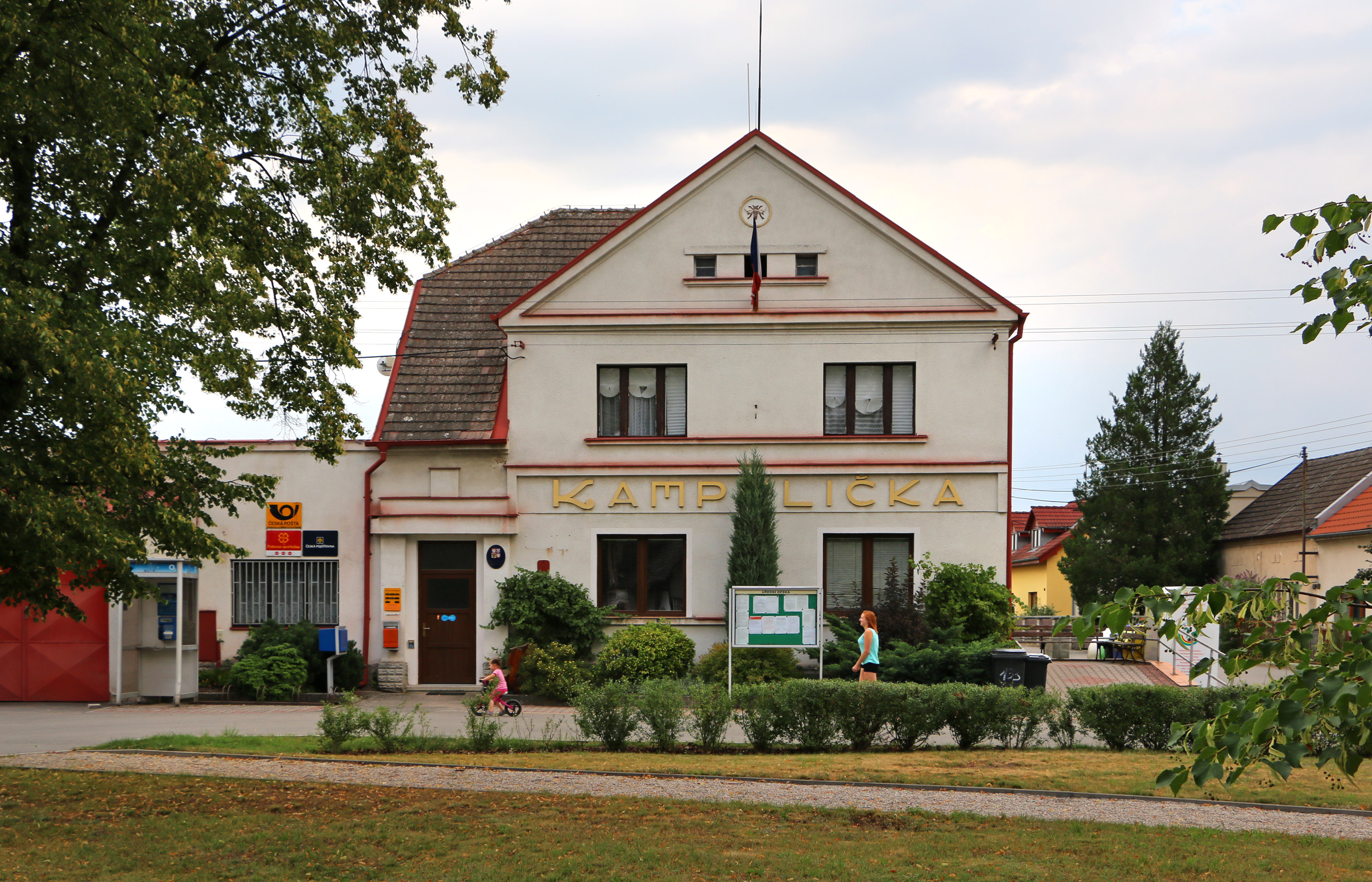
- Municipal office

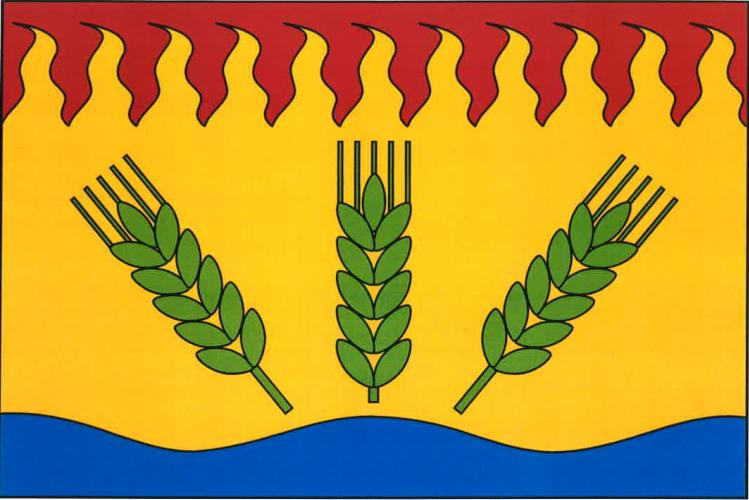
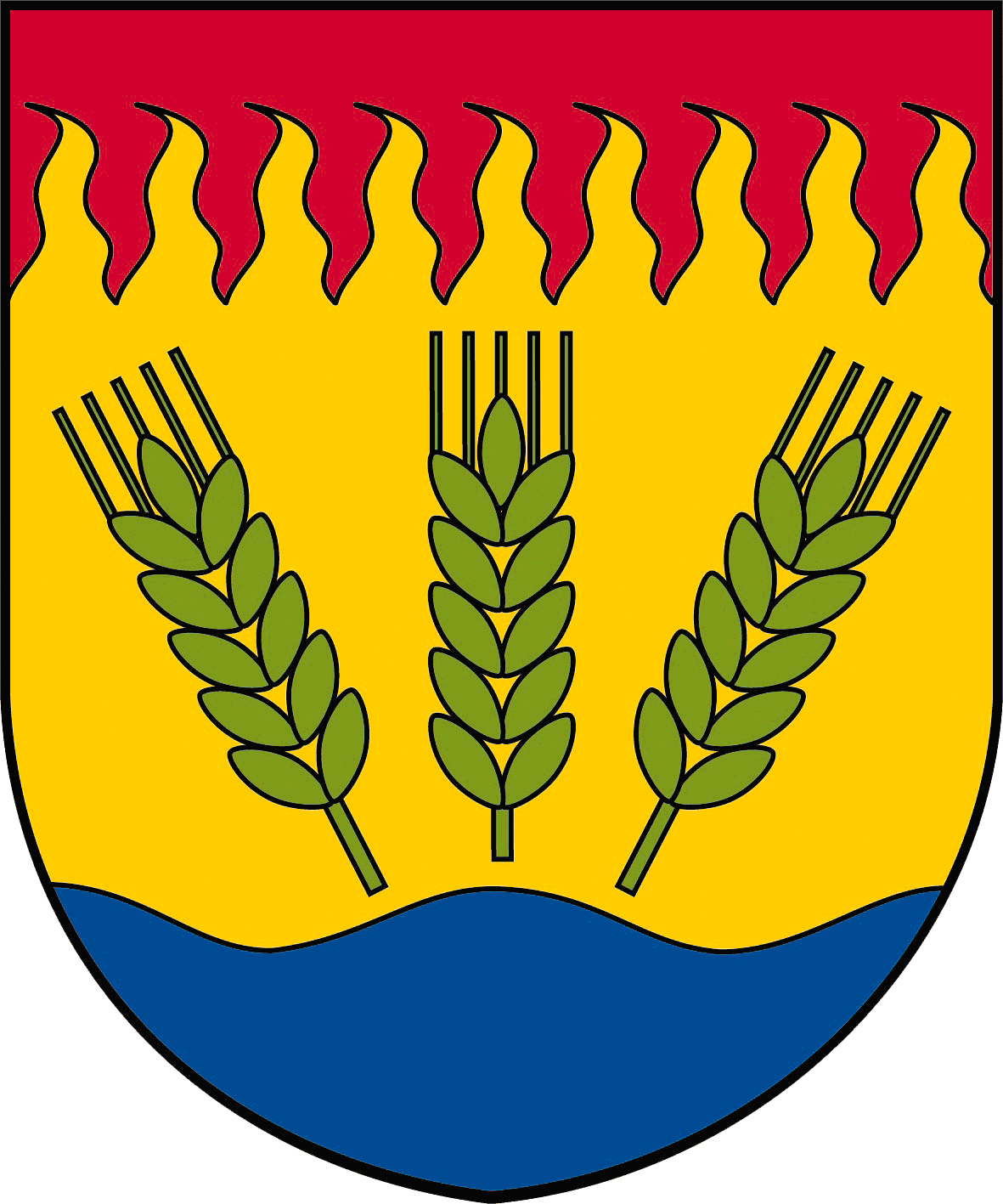
- Flag Coat of arms

- Location in the Czech Republic
- Coordinates: 50°7′11″N 16°4′10″E
- Country: Czech Republic
- Region: Hradec Králové
- District: Rychnov nad Kněžnou
- First mentioned: 1342

Area
  - Total: 9.36 km^{2} (3.61 sq mi)
- Elevation: 257 m (843 ft)

Population (2026-01-01)
  - Total: 537
  - Density: 57.4/km^{2} (149/sq mi)
- Time zone: UTC+1 (CET)
  - Summer (DST): UTC+2 (CEST)
- Postal code: 517 23
- Website: www.zdarnadorlici.cz

Žďár nad Orlicí (German: Brand an der Adler) is a municipality and village in Rychnov nad Kněžnou District in the Hradec Králové Region of the Czech Republic. It has about 500 inhabitants.

== Administrative division ==
Žďár nad Orlicí consists of three municipal parts (in brackets population according to the 2021 census):

- Žďár nad Orlicí (451)
- Chotiv (25)
- Světlá (33)

== History ==
The first written mention of Žďár nad Orlicí is from 1342.

== Demographics ==
Historical population
Year	Pop.	±%
1869	787	—
1880	833	+5.8%
1890	819	−1.7%
1900	785	−4.2%
1910	837	+6.6%
1921	836	−0.1%
1930	845	+1.1%
1950	656	−22.4%
1961	593	−9.6%
1970	569	−4.0%
1980	479	−15.8%
1991	427	−10.9%
2001	421	−1.4%
2011	435	+3.3%
2021	509	+17.0%
Source: Censuses
