= Pastviny =

- Municipality
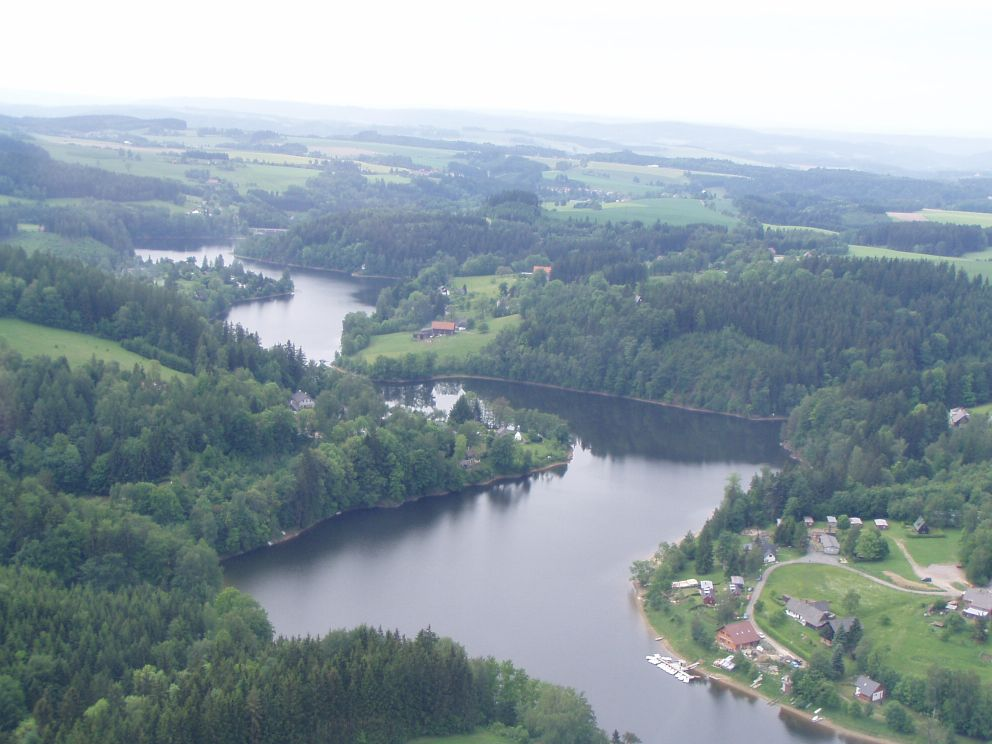
- Pastviny Reservoir

- Flag Coat of arms

- Location in the Czech Republic
- Coordinates: 50°5′43″N 16°33′54″E
- Country: Czech Republic
- Region: Pardubice
- District: Ústí nad Orlicí
- First mentioned: 1514

Area
  - Total: 8.35 km^{2} (3.22 sq mi)
- Elevation: 495 m (1,624 ft)

Population (2026-01-01)
  - Total: 378
  - Density: 45.3/km^{2} (117/sq mi)
- Time zone: UTC+1 (CET)
  - Summer (DST): UTC+2 (CEST)
- Postal code: 564 01
- Website: www.obecpastviny.cz

Pastviny (German: Weiden) is a municipality and village in Ústí nad Orlicí District in the Pardubice Region of the Czech Republic. It has about 400 inhabitants.

Pastviny lies approximately 19 kilometres (12 mi) north-east of Ústí nad Orlicí, 57 km (35 mi) east of Pardubice, and 154 km (96 mi) east of Prague.

== Demographics ==
Historical population
Year	Pop.	±%
1869	724	—
1880	836	+15.5%
1890	920	+10.0%
1900	795	−13.6%
1910	742	−6.7%
1921	695	−6.3%
1930	625	−10.1%
1950	377	−39.7%
1961	397	+5.3%
1970	356	−10.3%
1980	321	−9.8%
1991	313	−2.5%
2001	297	−5.1%
2011	362	+21.9%
2021	350	−3.3%
Source: Censuses
