= Neratov (Pardubice District) =

Municipality in the Czech Republic

- Municipality
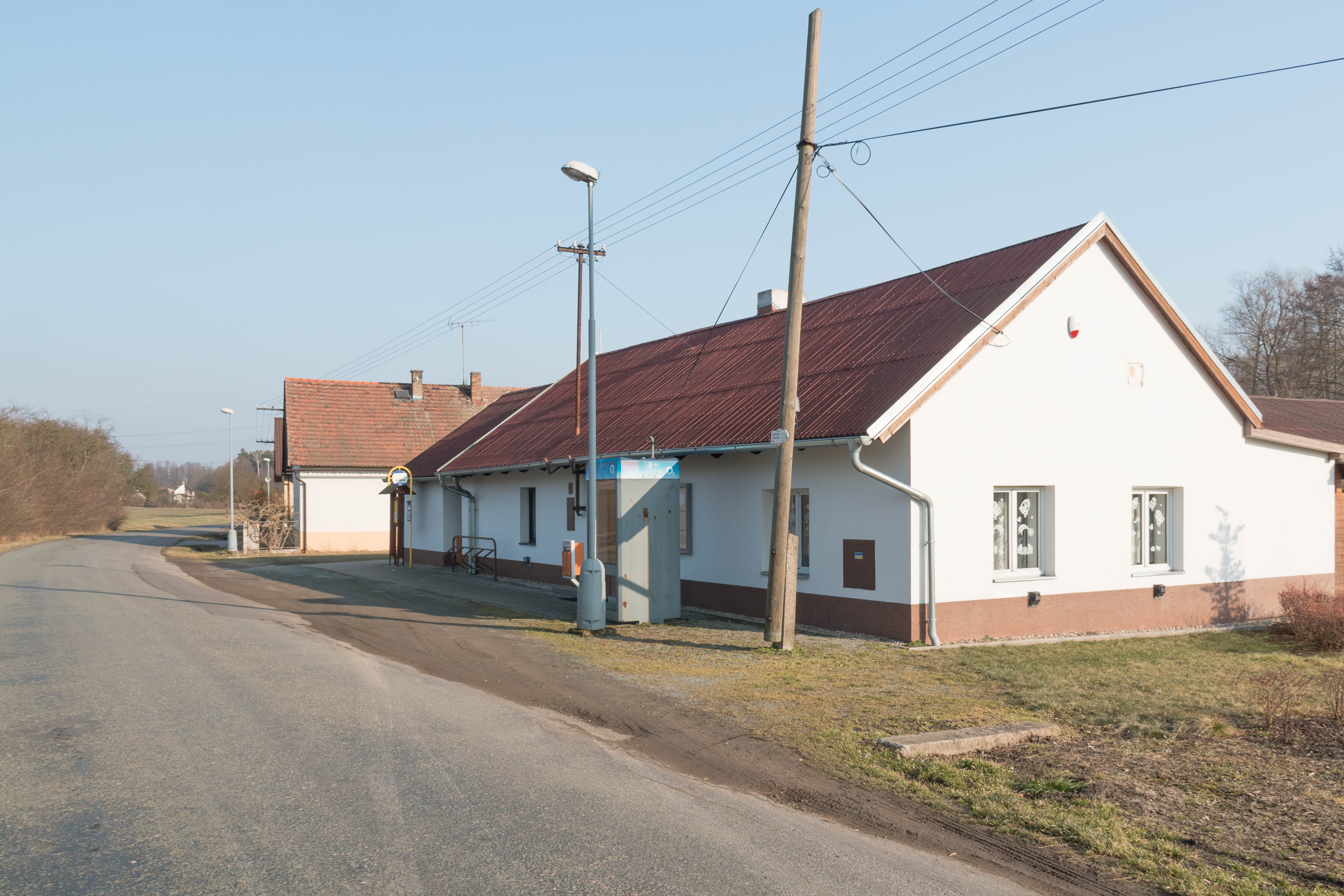
- Municipal office

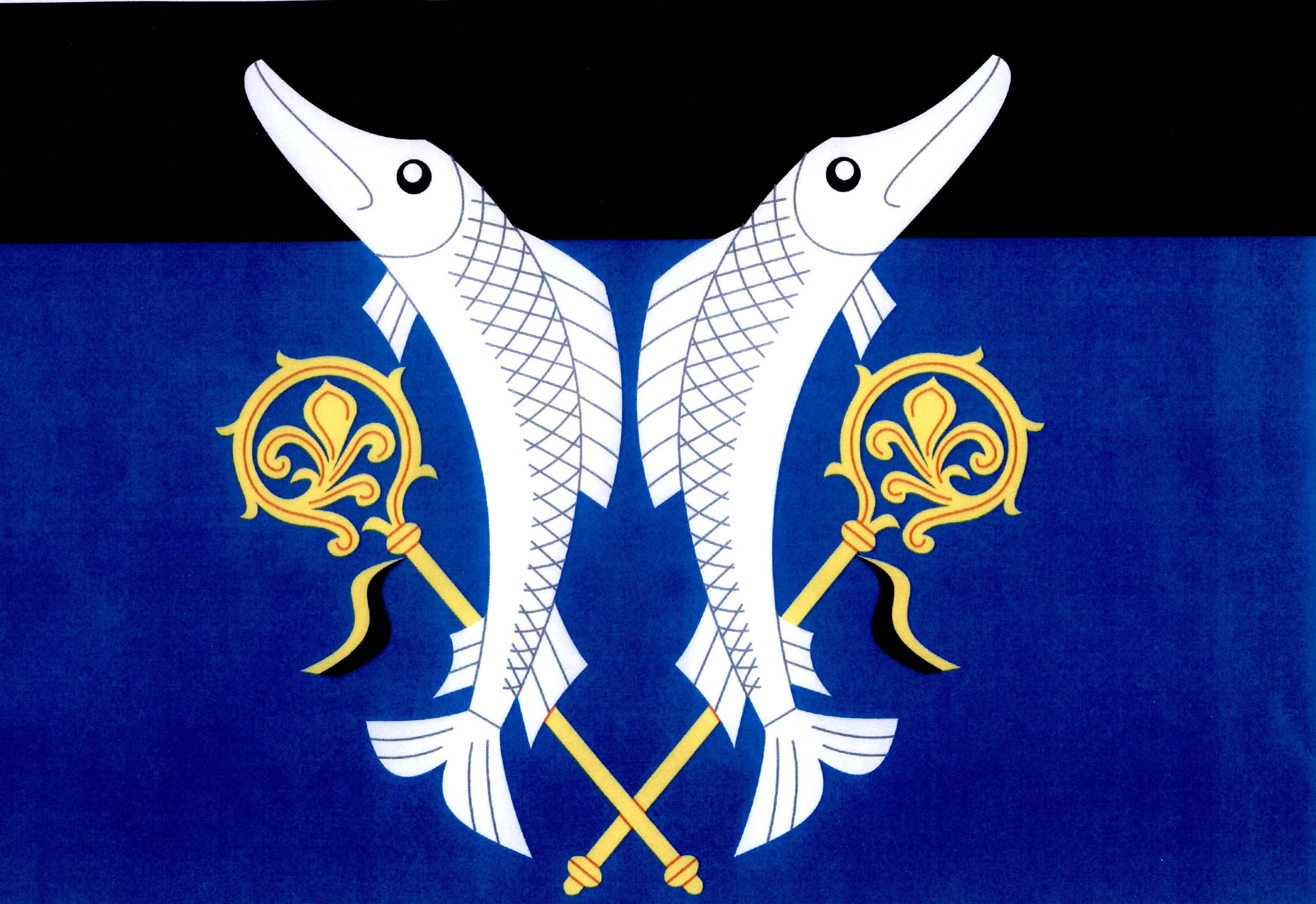
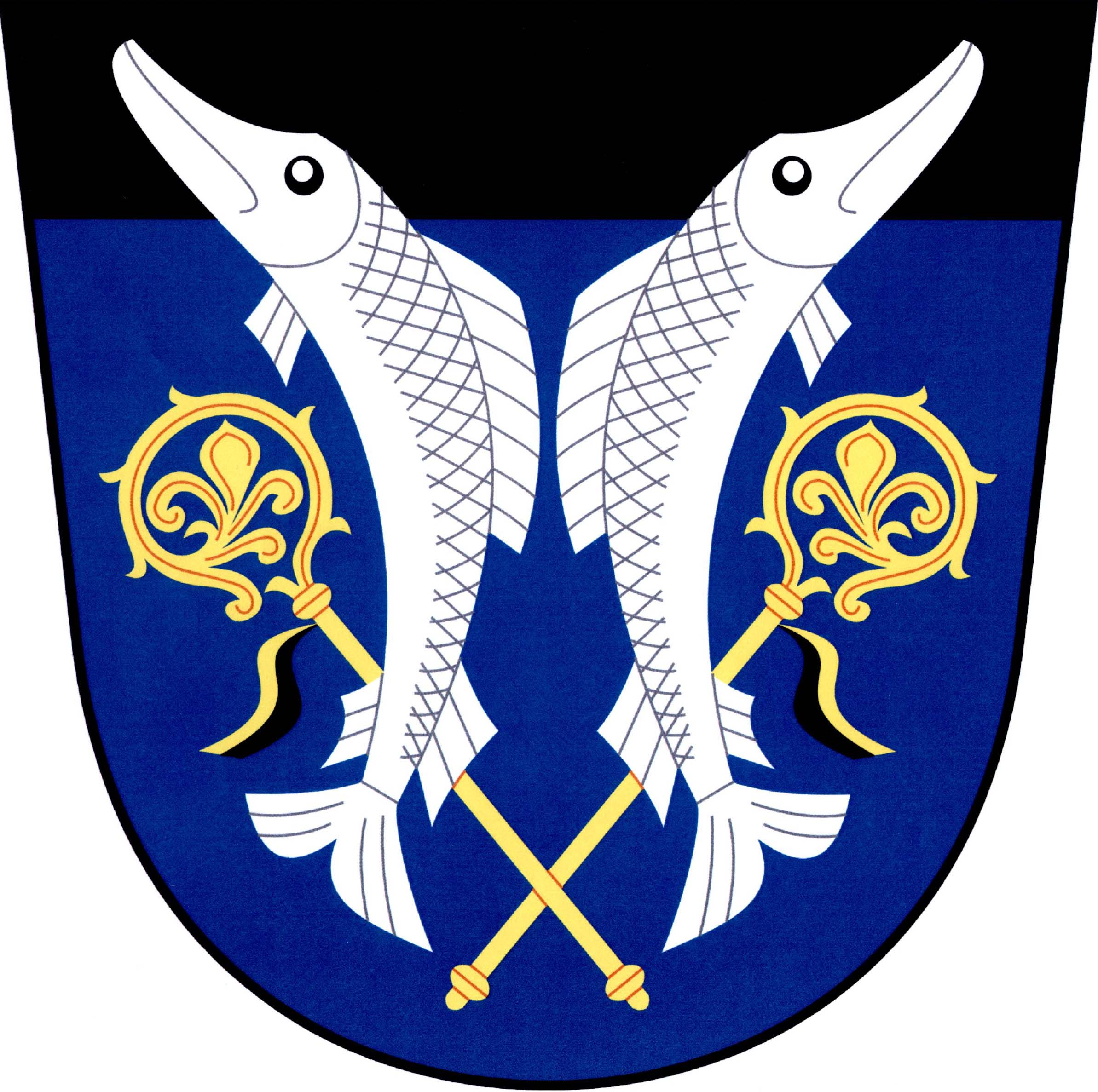
- Flag Coat of arms

- Location in the Czech Republic
- Coordinates: 50°4′47″N 15°38′50″E
- Country: Czech Republic
- Region: Pardubice
- District: Pardubice
- First mentioned: 1436

Area
  - Total: 4.04 km^{2} (1.56 sq mi)
- Elevation: 222 m (728 ft)

Population (2026-01-01)
  - Total: 176
  - Density: 43.6/km^{2} (113/sq mi)
- Time zone: UTC+1 (CET)
  - Summer (DST): UTC+2 (CEST)
- Postal code: 533 41
- Website: www.neratov-novinsko.cz

Neratov is a municipality and village in Pardubice District in the Pardubice Region of the Czech Republic. It has about 200 inhabitants.

== Demographics ==
Historical population
Year	Pop.	±%
1869	148	—
1880	151	+2.0%
1890	172	+13.9%
1900	157	−8.7%
1910	179	+14.0%
1921	173	−3.4%
1930	152	−12.1%
1950	130	−14.5%
1961	103	−20.8%
1970	94	−8.7%
1980	102	+8.5%
1991	80	−21.6%
2001	101	+26.2%
2011	144	+42.6%
2021	166	+15.3%
Source: Censuses
