= Čestice (Strakonice District) =

- Market town
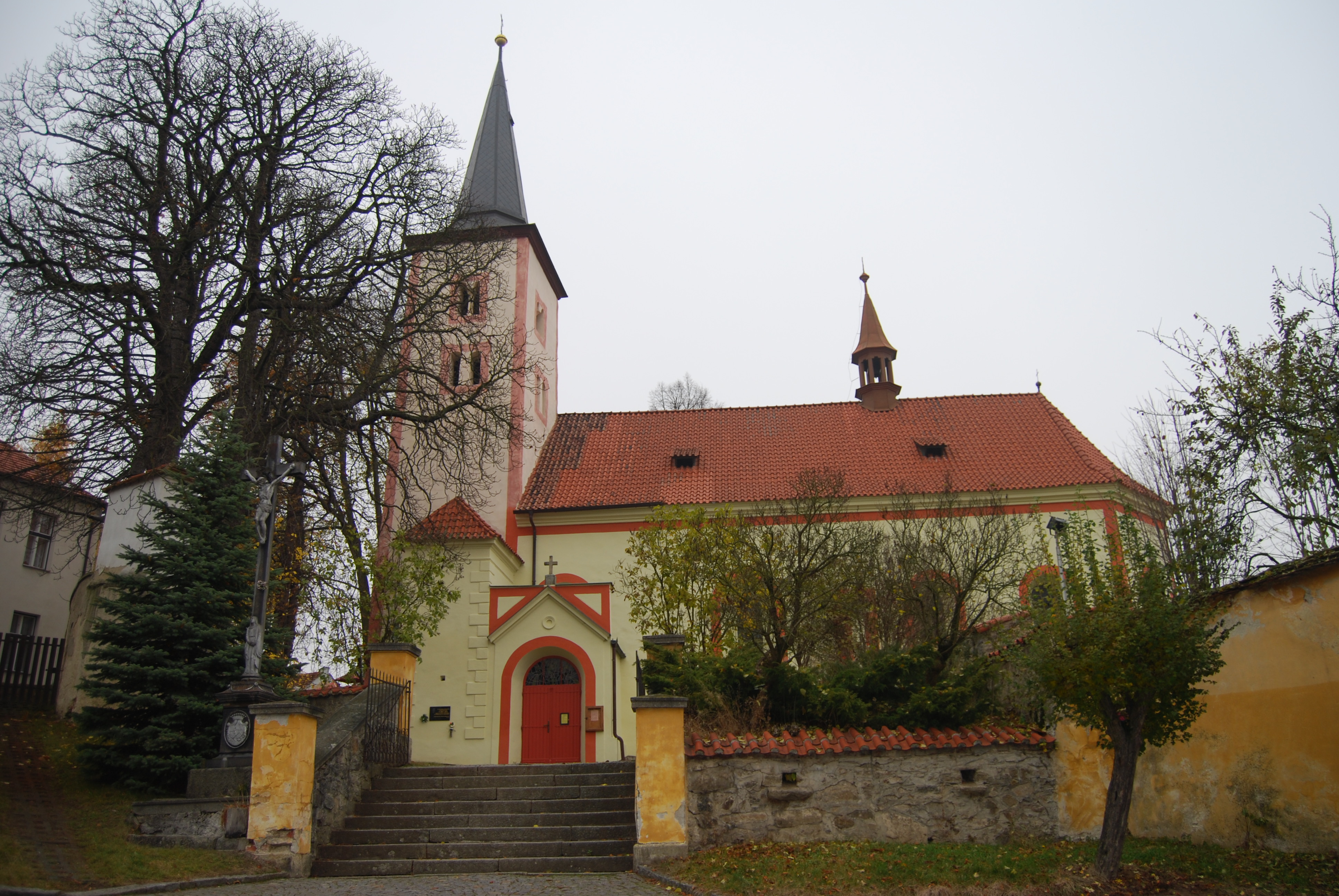
- Church of the Beheading of Saint John the Baptist

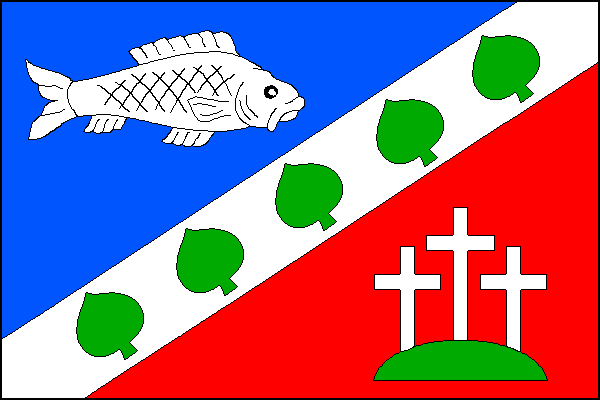
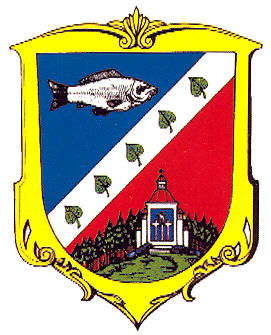
- Flag Coat of arms

- Location in the Czech Republic
- Coordinates: 49°10′4″N 13°48′13″E
- Country: Czech Republic
- Region: South Bohemian
- District: Strakonice
- First mentioned: 1243

Area
  - Total: 23.21 km^{2} (8.96 sq mi)
- Elevation: 558 m (1,831 ft)

Population (2026-01-01)
  - Total: 887
  - Density: 38.2/km^{2} (99.0/sq mi)
- Time zone: UTC+1 (CET)
  - Summer (DST): UTC+2 (CEST)
- Postal code: 387 19
- Website: www.cestice.cz

Čestice (Czech pronunciation: [ˈtʃɛscɪsɛ]) is a market town in Strakonice District in the South Bohemian Region of the Czech Republic. It has about 900 inhabitants.

== Administrative division ==
Čestice consists of seven municipal parts (in brackets population according to the 2021 census):

- Čestice (571)
- Doubravice u Volyně (81)
- Krušlov (52)
- Nahořany (90)
- Nuzín (37)
- Radešov (38)
- Střídka (26)

== Etymology ==
The name is derived from the personal name Částa, meaning "the village of Částa's people".

== Geography ==
Čestice is located about 13 kilometres (8 mi) southwest of Strakonice and 53 km (33 mi) northwest of České Budějovice. It lies in the Bohemian Forest Foothills. The highest point is the hill Vacovický vrch at 823 m (2,700 ft) above sea level. The Peklov Stream flows through the municipality.

== History ==
The first written mention of Čestice is in a deed of King Wenceslaus I from 1243. The village was probably founded in the mid-12th century.

In 1908, Čestice was promoted to a market town.

== Demographics ==
Historical population

Year	Pop.	±%
1869	1,868	—
1880	1,884	+0.9%
1890	1,907	+1.2%
1900	1,889	−0.9%
1910	1,929	+2.1%

Year	Pop.	±%
1921	1,891	−2.0%
1930	1,745	−7.7%
1950	1,288	−26.2%
1961	1,281	−0.5%
1970	1,178	−8.0%

Year	Pop.	±%
1980	1,115	−5.3%
1991	992	−11.0%
2001	952	−4.0%
2011	893	−6.2%
2021	895	+0.2%

Source: Censuses

== Transport ==
There are no railways or major roads passing through the municipality.

== Sights ==
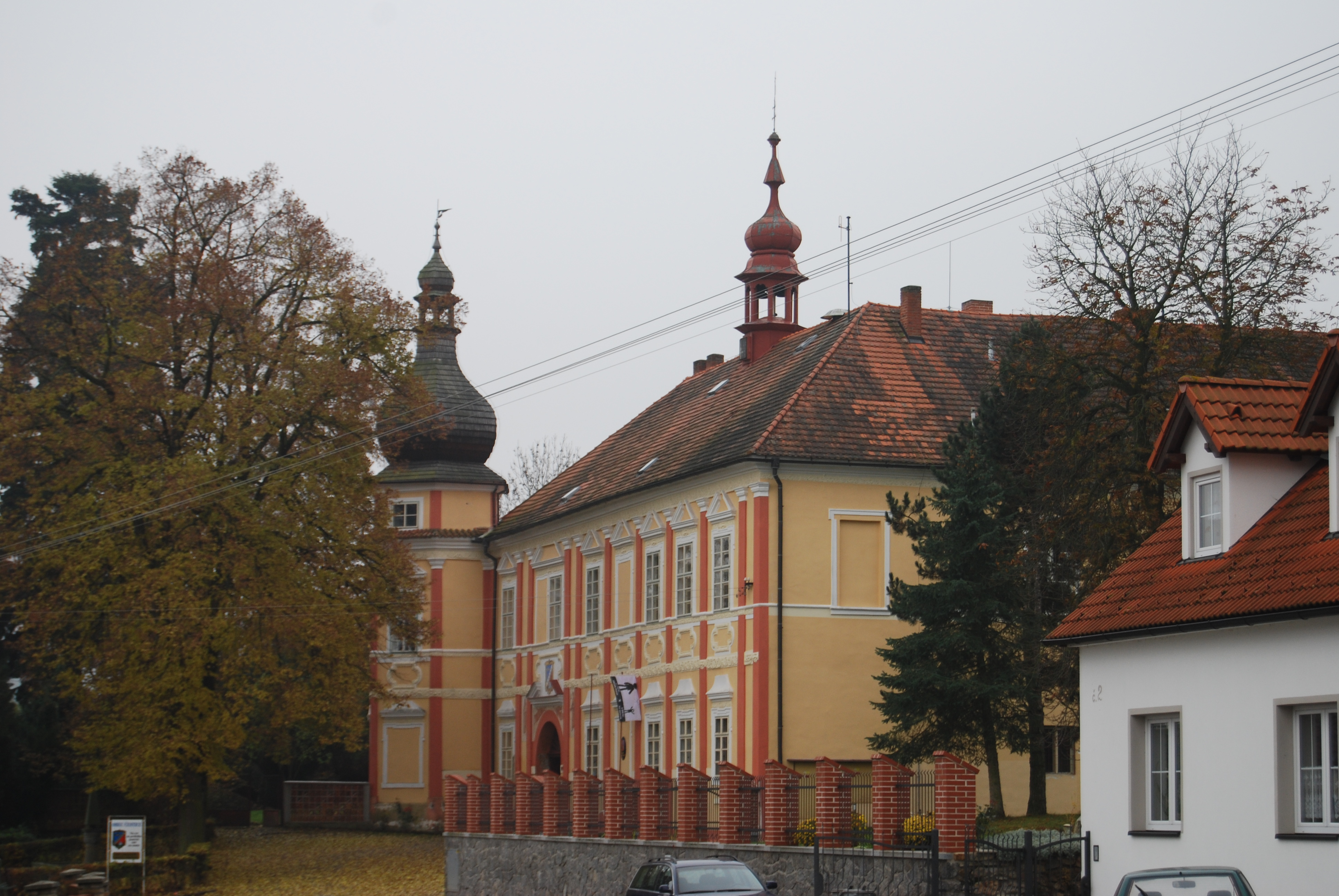
Čestice Castle

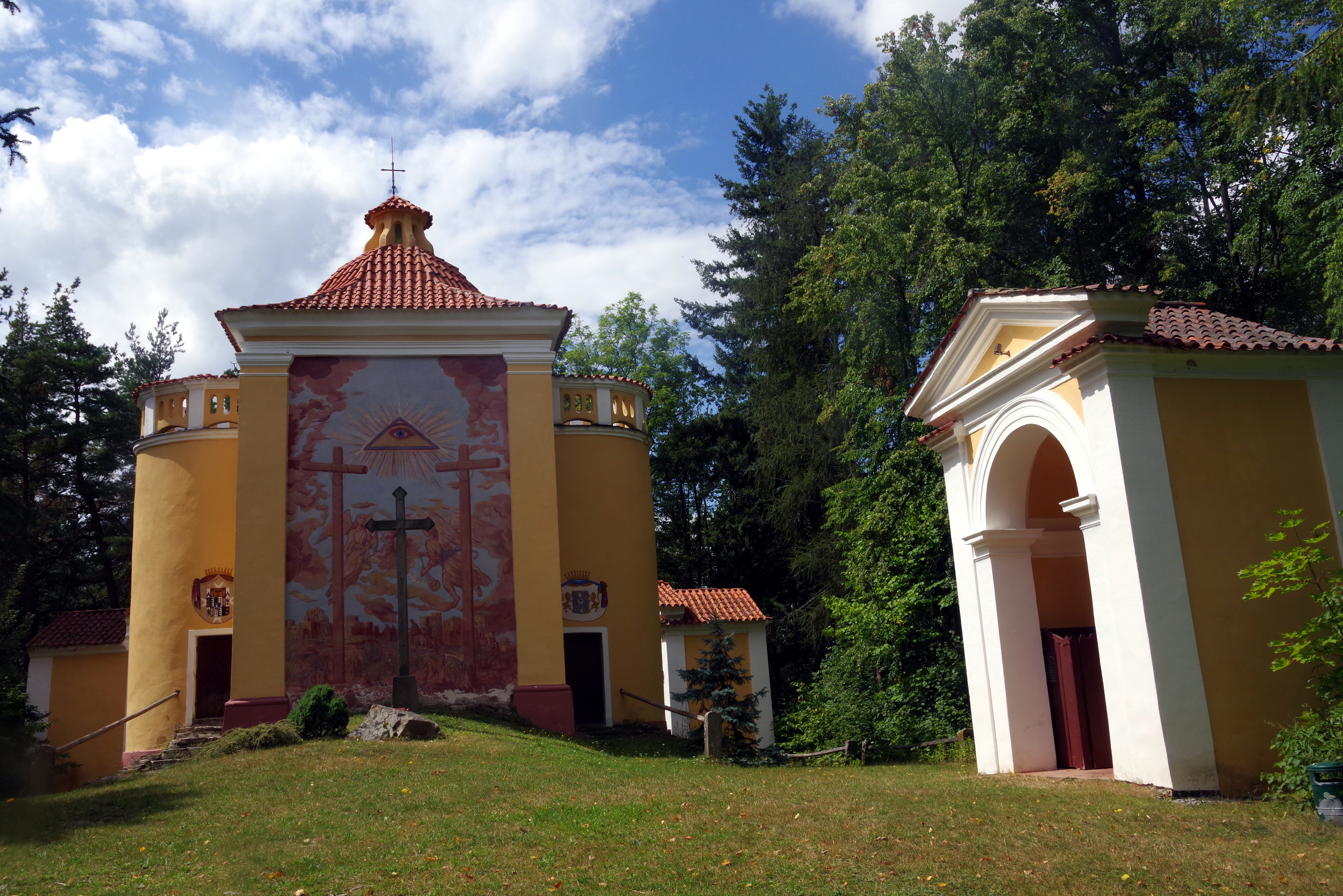
Pilgrimage site

The Čestice Castle was built in the early Baroque style in the third quarter of the 17th century. It was built next to an old fortress, fragments of which have survived to this day. The castle is surrounded by a small landscape park. Today it is owned by the market town and houses the municipal office, social spaces, a small museum and a library.

The Church of the Beheading of Saint John the Baptist was originally a Romanesque-Gothic church from the beginning of the 13th century. In the 14th century, it was rebuilt in the Gothic style. In 1819–1820 and 1843–1844, the church was rebuilt into its present form. Very valuable are the preserved elements from the original church, including the wall paintings from the 14th century.

On the Kalvárie hill above the market town is a pilgrimage site. It consists of the centrally located Chapel of the Exaltation of the Holy Cross, the Chapel of Our Lady of Sorrows on the hillside, five other small chapels, and a hermitage. The area was probably founded in 1626, when there were built wooden chapels and crosses. In 1728, they were replaced by brick chapels. The Chapel of the Exaltation of the Holy Cross was built between the small Baroque chapels in 1820, in the Neoclassical style.

The main landmark of Nahořany is the Chapel of Saints Cyril and Methodius. It was built in the pseudo-Baroque style in 1884.

In Doubravice u Volyně is a two-storey tower from the 15th century. It is a remnant of a fortress, which was first documented in 1251. Although the residential part of the fortress was abandoned around 1500 and has not been preserved, the tower is a valuable document of a medieval seat of the lower nobility in the region.
