= Líšnice (Ústí nad Orlicí District) =

- Municipality
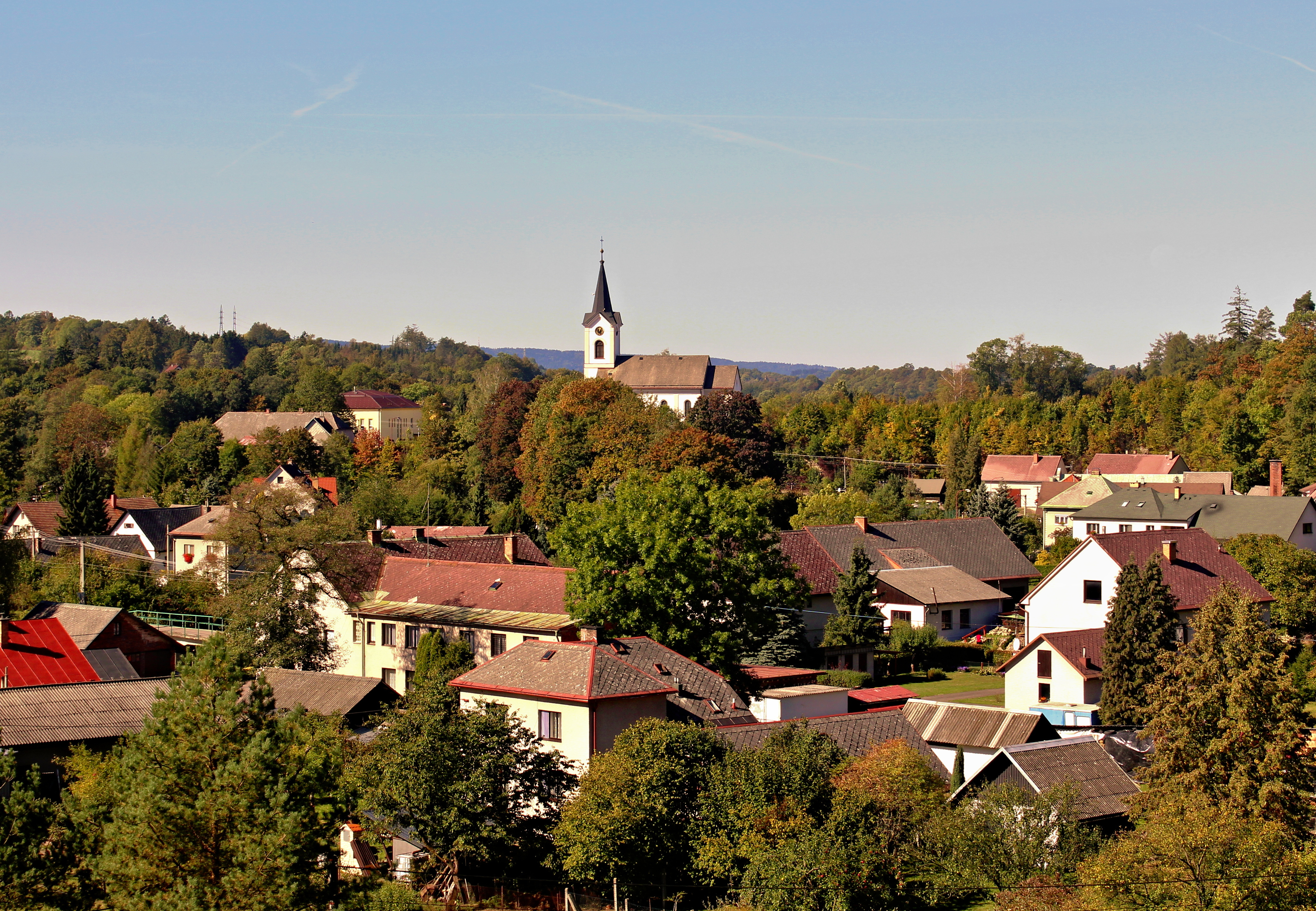
- General view of Líšnice

- Flag Coat of arms

- Location in the Czech Republic
- Coordinates: 50°4′47″N 16°30′30″E
- Country: Czech Republic
- Region: Pardubice
- District: Ústí nad Orlicí
- First mentioned: 1514

Area
  - Total: 11.50 km^{2} (4.44 sq mi)
- Elevation: 430 m (1,410 ft)

Population (2026-01-01)
  - Total: 768
  - Density: 66.8/km^{2} (173/sq mi)
- Time zone: UTC+1 (CET)
  - Summer (DST): UTC+2 (CEST)
- Postal code: 561 84
- Website: www.obeclisnice.cz

Líšnice (German: Lischnitz) is a municipality and village in Ústí nad Orlicí District in the Pardubice Region of the Czech Republic. It has about 800 inhabitants.

Líšnice lies approximately 15 kilometres (9 mi) north-east of Ústí nad Orlicí, 53 km (33 mi) east of Pardubice, and 150 km (93 mi) east of Prague.

== Demographics ==
Historical population
Year	Pop.	±%
1869	1,152	—
1880	1,125	−2.3%
1890	1,131	+0.5%
1900	1,044	−7.7%
1910	1,086	+4.0%
1921	1,046	−3.7%
1930	962	−8.0%
1950	770	−20.0%
1961	785	+1.9%
1970	751	−4.3%
1980	690	−8.1%
1991	707	+2.5%
2001	728	+3.0%
2011	745	+2.3%
2021	744	−0.1%
Source: Censuses
