= Nekoř =

- Municipality
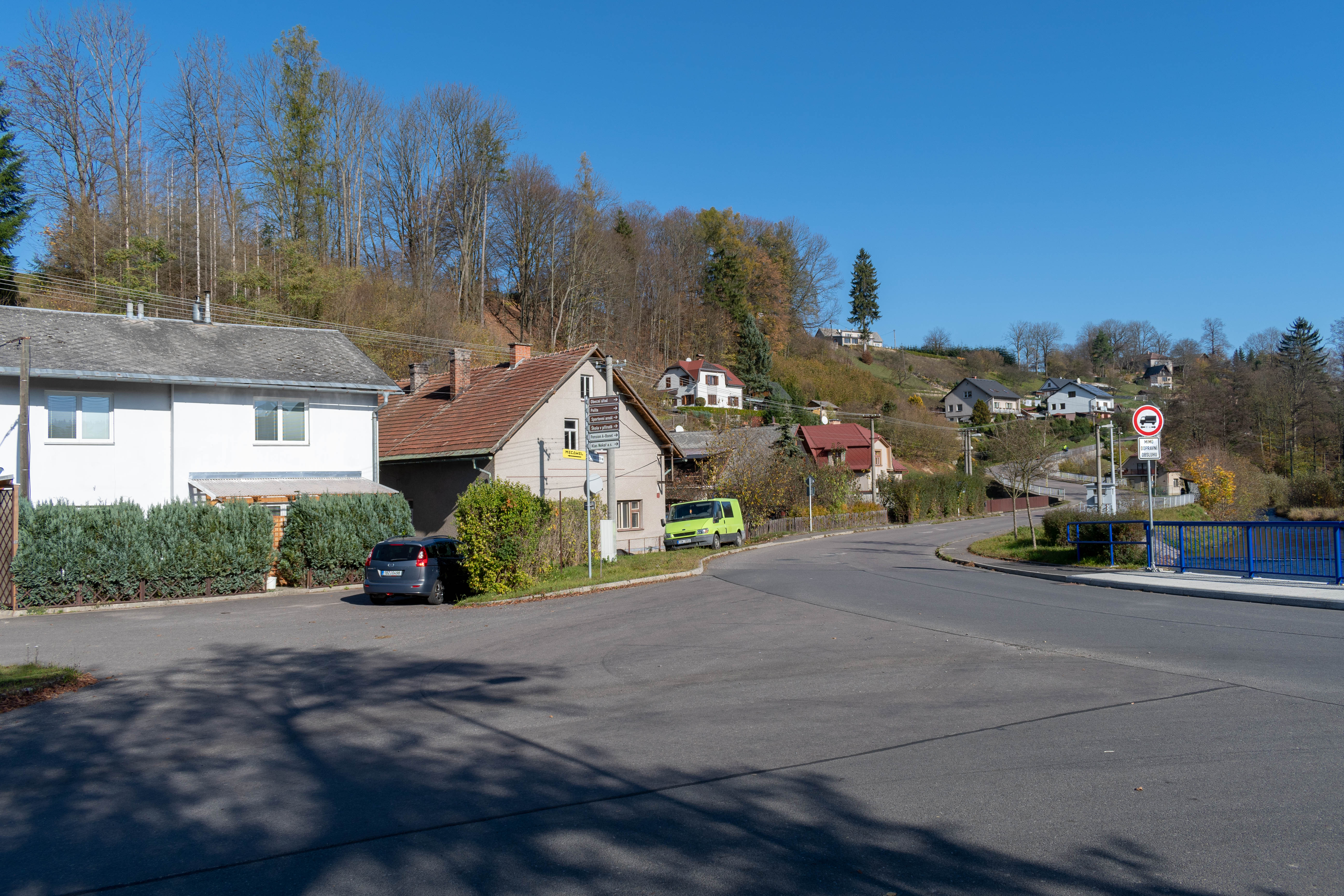
- Centre of Nekoř

- Flag Coat of arms

- Location in the Czech Republic
- Coordinates: 50°3′21″N 16°33′5″E
- Country: Czech Republic
- Region: Pardubice
- District: Ústí nad Orlicí
- First mentioned: 1355

Area
  - Total: 10.95 km^{2} (4.23 sq mi)
- Elevation: 475 m (1,558 ft)

Population (2026-01-01)
  - Total: 985
  - Density: 90.0/km^{2} (233/sq mi)
- Time zone: UTC+1 (CET)
  - Summer (DST): UTC+2 (CEST)
- Postal code: 561 63
- Website: www.nekor.cz

Nekoř (German: Nekor) is a municipality and village in Ústí nad Orlicí District in the Pardubice Region of the Czech Republic. It has about 1,000 inhabitants.

Nekoř lies approximately 15 kilometres (9 mi) north-east of Ústí nad Orlicí, 56 km (35 mi) east of Pardubice, and 153 km (95 mi) east of Prague.

== Administrative division ==
Nekoř consists of three municipal parts (in brackets population according to the 2021 census):

- Nekoř (857)
- Bredůvka (62)
- Údolí (6)

== Demographics ==
Historical population
Year	Pop.	±%
1869	1,758	—
1880	1,852	+5.3%
1890	1,942	+4.9%
1900	1,670	−14.0%
1910	1,851	+10.8%
1921	1,660	−10.3%
1930	1,409	−15.1%
1950	1,014	−28.0%
1961	1,070	+5.5%
1970	976	−8.8%
1980	947	−3.0%
1991	871	−8.0%
2001	895	+2.8%
2011	909	+1.6%
2021	925	+1.8%
Source: Censuses
