= Bartošovice v Orlických horách =

- Municipality
- Centre of Bartošovice v Orlických horách

- Flag Coat of arms

- Location in the Czech Republic
- Coordinates: 50°9′50″N 16°32′52″E
- Country: Czech Republic
- Region: Hradec Králové
- District: Rychnov nad Kněžnou
- First mentioned: 1548

Area
  - Total: 35.61 km^{2} (13.75 sq mi)
- Elevation: 580 m (1,900 ft)

Population (2026-01-01)
  - Total: 225
  - Density: 6.32/km^{2} (16.4/sq mi)
- Time zone: UTC+1 (CET)
  - Summer (DST): UTC+2 (CEST)
- Postal code: 517 61
- Website: www.bartosovice.eu

Bartošovice v Orlických horách (German: Batzdorf) is a municipality and village in Rychnov nad Kněžnou District in the Hradec Králové Region of the Czech Republic. It has about 200 inhabitants.

== Etymology ==
The initial name of the village was Bartoušovice. The name was derived from the personal name Bartouš, meaning "the village of Bartouš's people".

== Geography ==
Bartošovice v Orlických horách is located about 19 kilometres (12 mi) east of Rychnov nad Kněžnou and 50 km (31 mi) east of Hradec Králové. It lies in the Orlické Mountains. The highest point is the mountain Anenský vrch at 992 m (3,255 ft) above sea level. The municipality is situated along the border with Poland, which is formed here by the Divoká Orlice River along its entire length.

== History ==
The settlement of the area started in 1495, when Czech nobleman Jan Bartoušovský of Labouň bought this land with the right to establish a village. The first written mention of Bartošovice is from 1548.

Between 1938 and 1945, the municipality was annexed by Nazi Germany and administered as part of the Reichsgau Sudetenland. After World War II, the German-speaking population was expelled by the Beneš decrees.

== Demographics ==
Historical population

Year	Pop.	±%
1869	2,696	—
1880	2,681	−0.6%
1890	2,608	−2.7%
1900	2,303	−11.7%
1910	2,105	−8.6%

Year	Pop.	±%
1921	1,898	−9.8%
1930	1,834	−3.4%
1950	267	−85.4%
1961	359	+34.5%
1970	286	−20.3%

Year	Pop.	±%
1980	249	−12.9%
1991	219	−12.0%
2001	218	−0.5%
2011	205	−6.0%
2021	193	−5.9%

Source: Censuses

== Transport ==
In the municipality is the road border crossing Bartošovice v Orlických horách / Niemojów with Poland.

== Sights ==
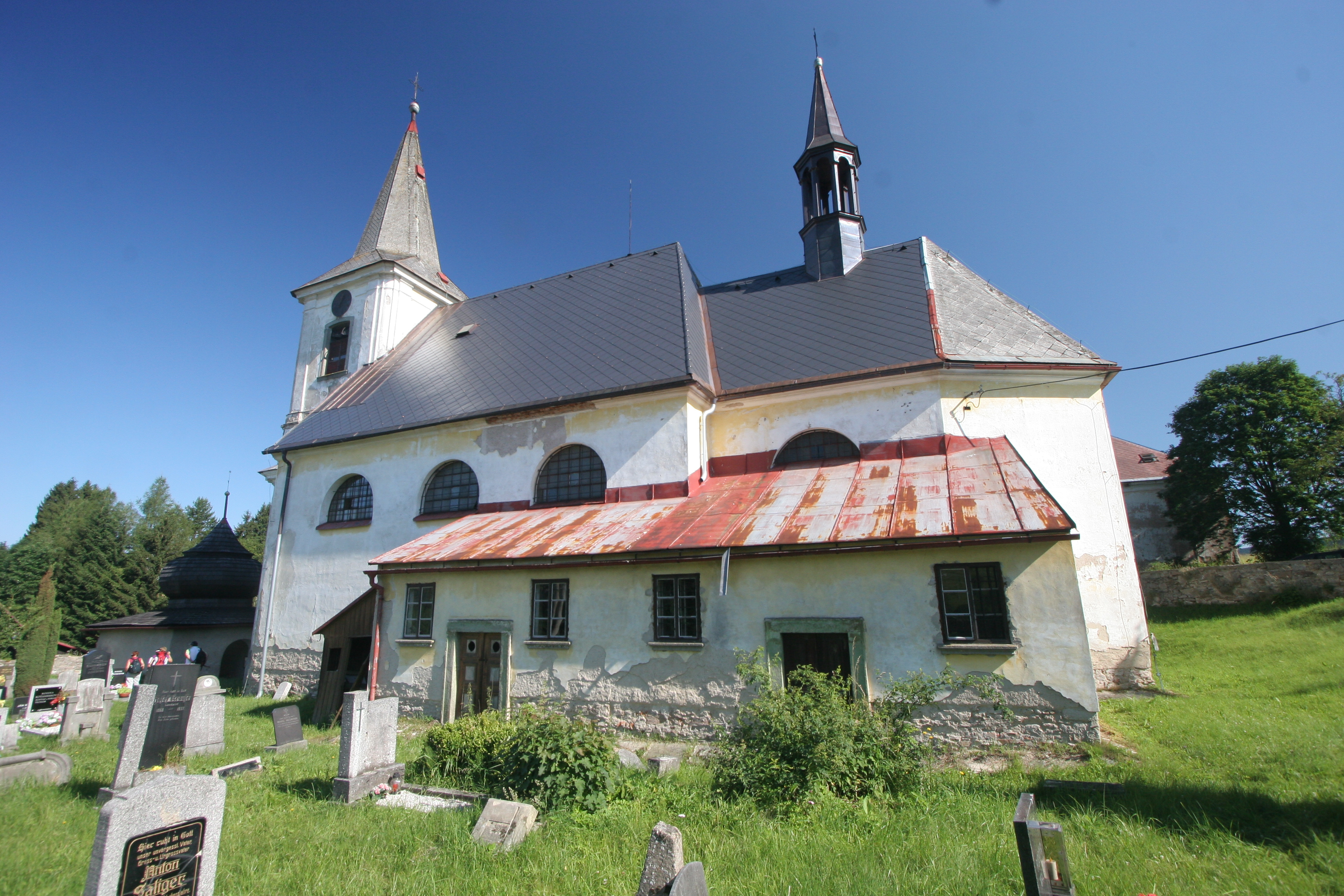
Church of Saint Mary Magdalene

The main landmark of the village is the Church of Saint Mary Magdalene. This Baroque church dates from 1673, when it replaced an old wooden church. It was reconstructed in 1906, after it was damaged by a fire.
