= Záměl =

- Municipality
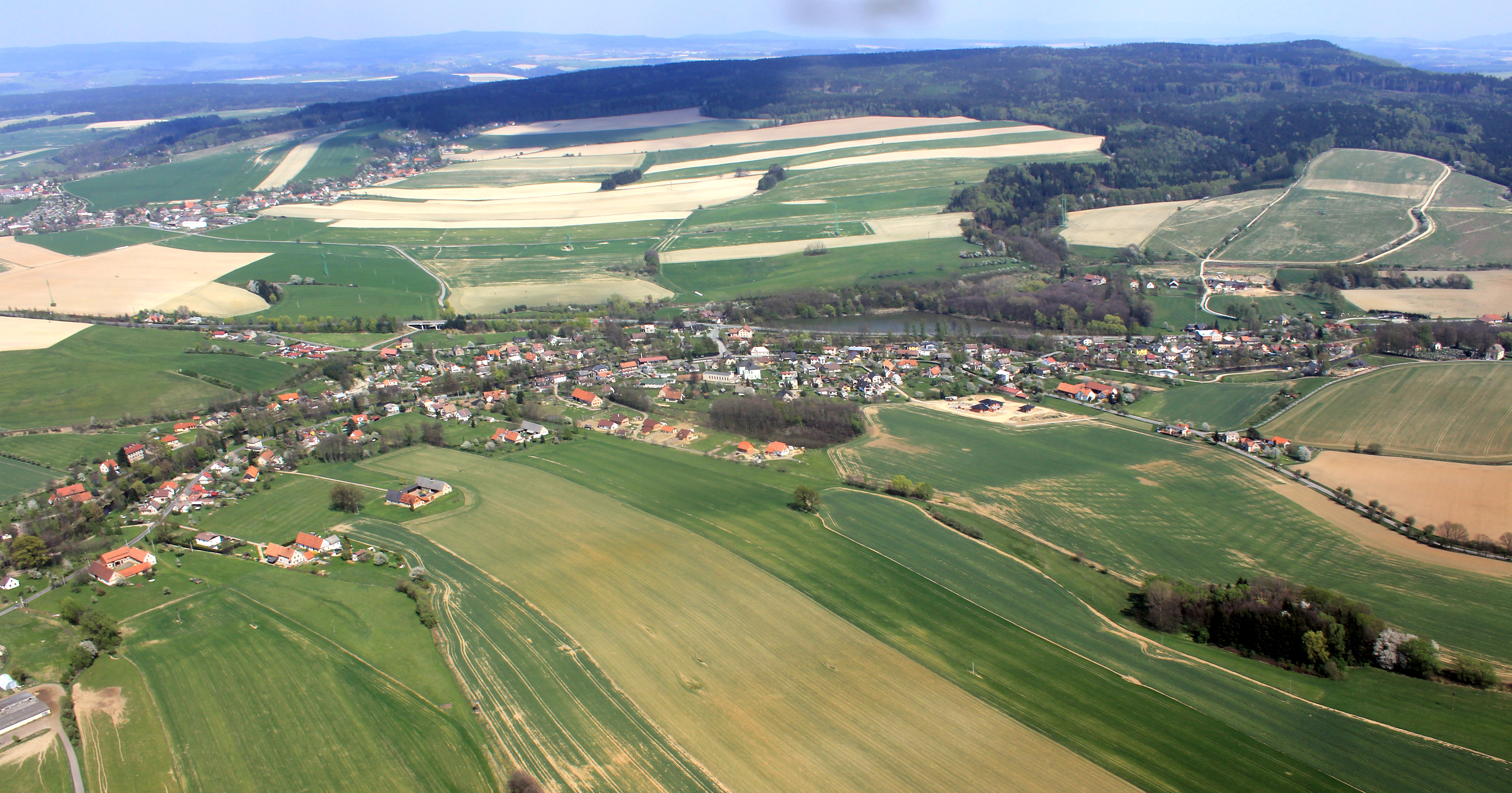
- Aerial view

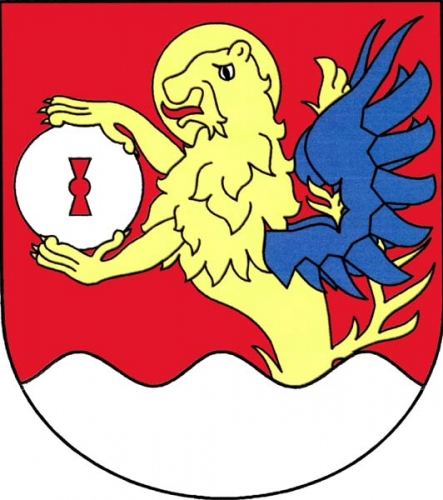
- Flag Coat of arms

- Location in the Czech Republic
- Coordinates: 50°5′48″N 16°17′56″E
- Country: Czech Republic
- Region: Hradec Králové
- District: Rychnov nad Kněžnou
- First mentioned: 1356

Area
  - Total: 5.51 km^{2} (2.13 sq mi)
- Elevation: 292 m (958 ft)

Population (2026-01-01)
  - Total: 662
  - Density: 120/km^{2} (311/sq mi)
- Time zone: UTC+1 (CET)
  - Summer (DST): UTC+2 (CEST)
- Postal code: 517 43
- Website: www.obeczamel.cz

Záměl is a municipality and village in Rychnov nad Kněžnou District in the Hradec Králové Region of the Czech Republic. It has about 700 inhabitants.

== Demographics ==
Historical population
| Year | Pop. | ±% |
|---|---|---|
| 1869 | 763 | — |
| 1880 | 744 | −2.5% |
| 1890 | 756 | +1.6% |
| 1900 | 732 | −3.2% |
| 1910 | 780 | +6.6% |
| 1921 | 782 | +0.3% |
| 1930 | 828 | +5.9% |
| 1950 | 585 | −29.3% |
| 1961 | 643 | +9.9% |
| 1970 | 631 | −1.9% |
| 1980 | 620 | −1.7% |
| 1991 | 628 | +1.3% |
| 2001 | 614 | −2.2% |
| 2011 | 632 | +2.9% |
| 2021 | 584 | −7.6% |
Source: Censuses
