= Klášterec nad Orlicí =

- Municipality
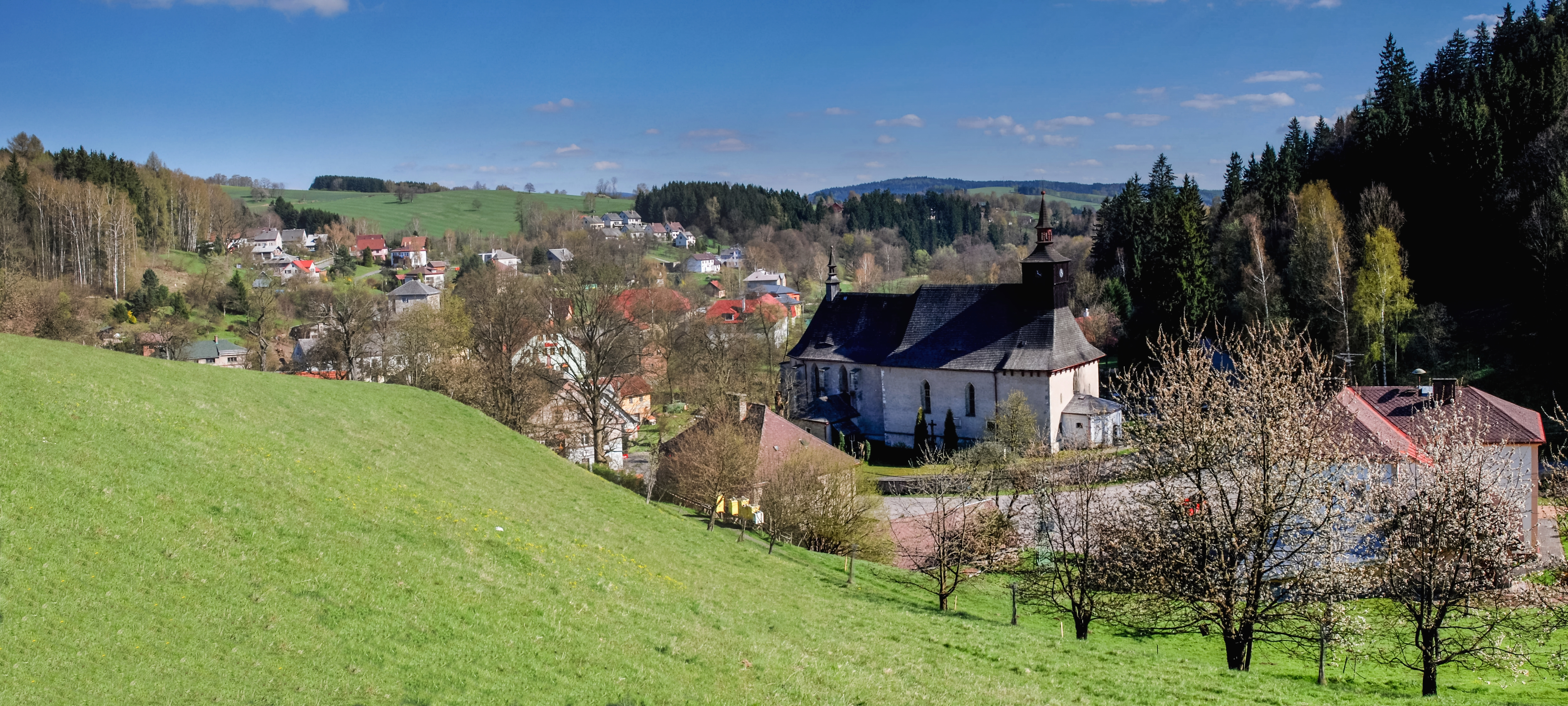
- Panorama of Klášterec nad Orlicí

- Flag Coat of arms

- Location in the Czech Republic
- Coordinates: 50°6′42″N 16°33′16″E
- Country: Czech Republic
- Region: Pardubice
- District: Ústí nad Orlicí
- First mentioned: 1290

Area
  - Total: 17.95 km^{2} (6.93 sq mi)
- Elevation: 490 m (1,610 ft)

Population (2026-01-01)
  - Total: 904
  - Density: 50.4/km^{2} (130/sq mi)
- Time zone: UTC+1 (CET)
  - Summer (DST): UTC+2 (CEST)
- Postal code: 561 82
- Website: www.klasterecnadorlici.cz

Klášterec nad Orlicí (German: Klösterle) is a municipality and village in Ústí nad Orlicí District in the Pardubice Region of the Czech Republic. It has about 900 inhabitants.

== Administrative division ==
Klášterec nad Orlicí consists of five municipal parts (in brackets population according to the 2021 census):

- Klášterec nad Orlicí (634)
- Čihák (5)
- Jedlina (32)
- Lhotka (136)
- Zbudov (81)

== Etymology ==
The Czech word klášterec is a diminutive of klášter, i.e. 'monastery'. The name refers to a small fortified monastery, which used to stand here when the village was founded.

== Geography ==
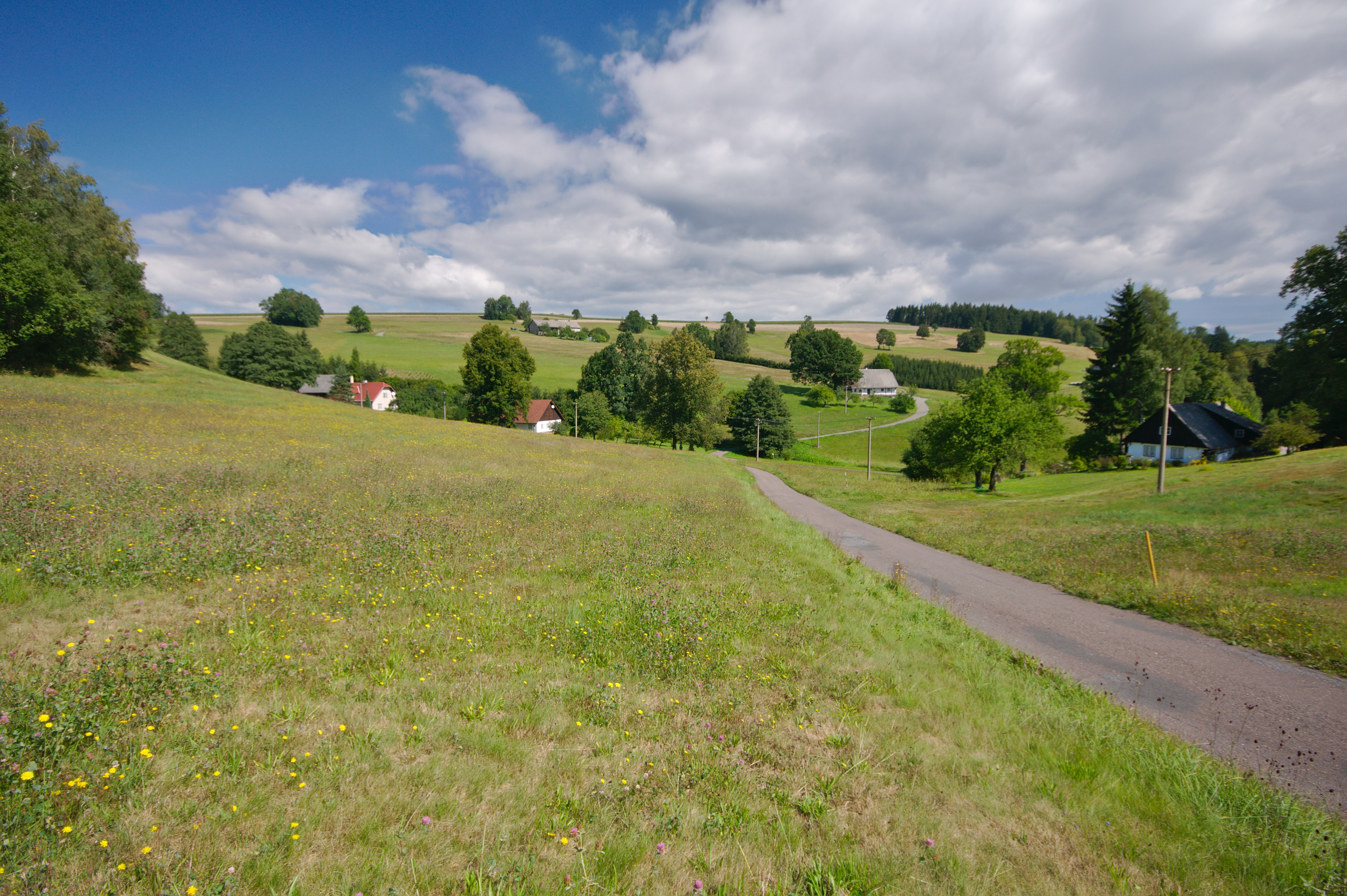
Scattered buildings in the northern part of Klášterec nad Orlicí

Klášterec nad Orlicí is located about 19 kilometres (12 mi) northeast of Ústí nad Orlicí and 55 km (34 mi) east of Pardubice. It lies in the Orlické Mountains. The highest point is the hill Bučina at 677 m (2,221 ft) above sea level. The Divoká Orlice River flows through the municipality.

== History ==
Klášterec nad Orlicí was most likely founded before 1280. The first written mention of the village is in a document of bishop Tobiáš of Bechyně from the period between 1279 and 1290, in which he praises the intention to build a monastery in this landscape. The next mention is in the bull of Pope Boniface VIII from 1295. The village was originally formed by two parts named Orlík and Orlička. The name Klášterec first appeared after 1395.

== Demographics ==
Historical population

Year	Pop.	±%
1869	1,594	—
1880	1,729	+8.5%
1890	1,763	+2.0%
1900	1,701	−3.5%
1910	1,605	−5.6%

Year	Pop.	±%
1921	1,414	−11.9%
1930	1,330	−5.9%
1950	1,478	+11.1%
1961	923	−37.6%
1970	864	−6.4%

Year	Pop.	±%
1980	803	−7.1%
1991	771	−4.0%
2001	885	+14.8%
2011	845	−4.5%
2021	888	+5.1%

Source: Censuses

== Transport ==
There are no railways or major roads passing through the municipality.

== Sights ==
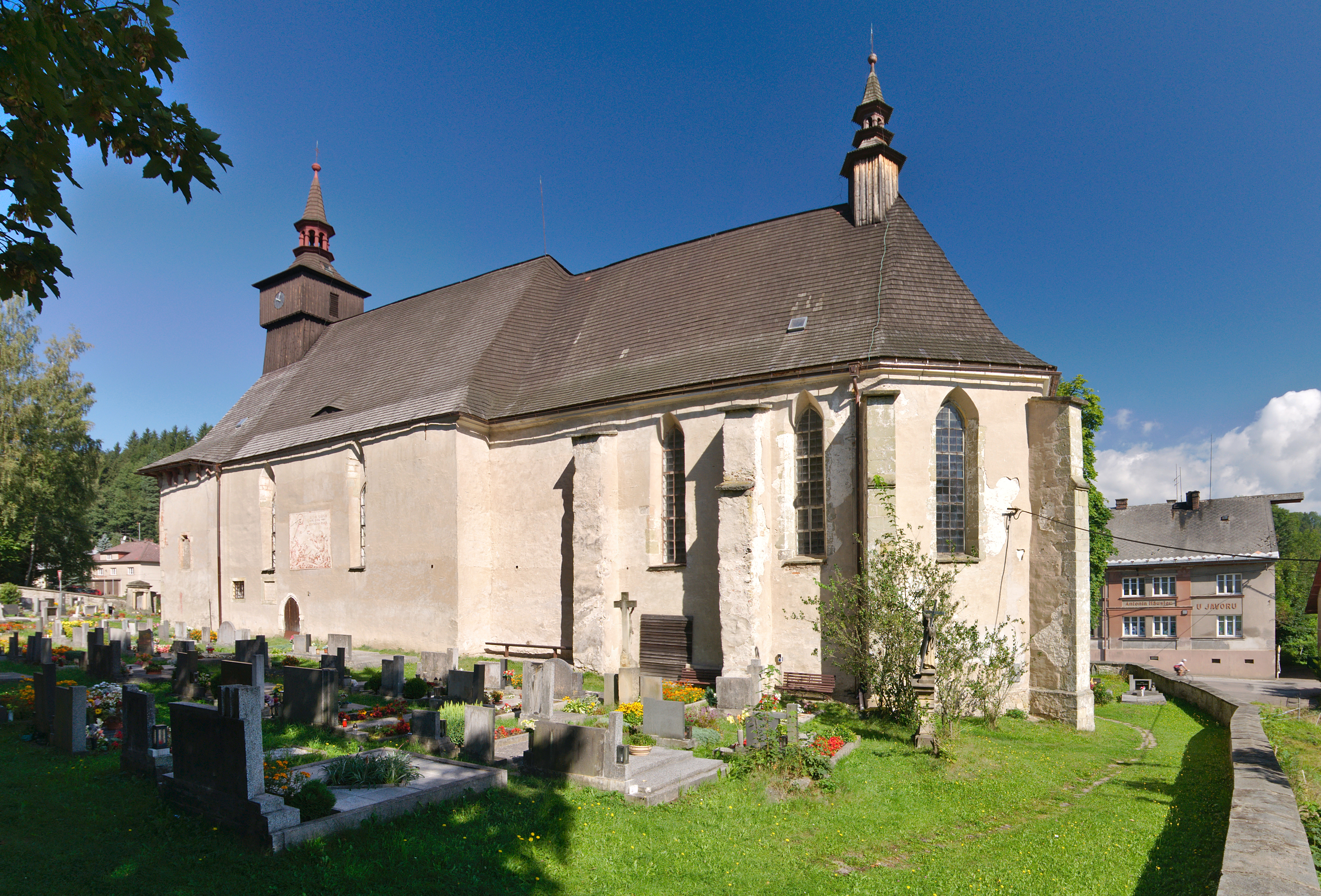
Church of the Holy Trinity

The Church of the Holy Trinity is a valuable example of a rural church. It was founded at the end of the 13th century and rebuilt in the late Gothic style in 1452–1453. Later it was modified in the Renaissance and Baroque styles. The church complex also includes a late Baroque ossuary from 1793, an enclosure wall, and a calvary from 1799.
