= Čestice (Rychnov nad Kněžnou District) =

- Municipality
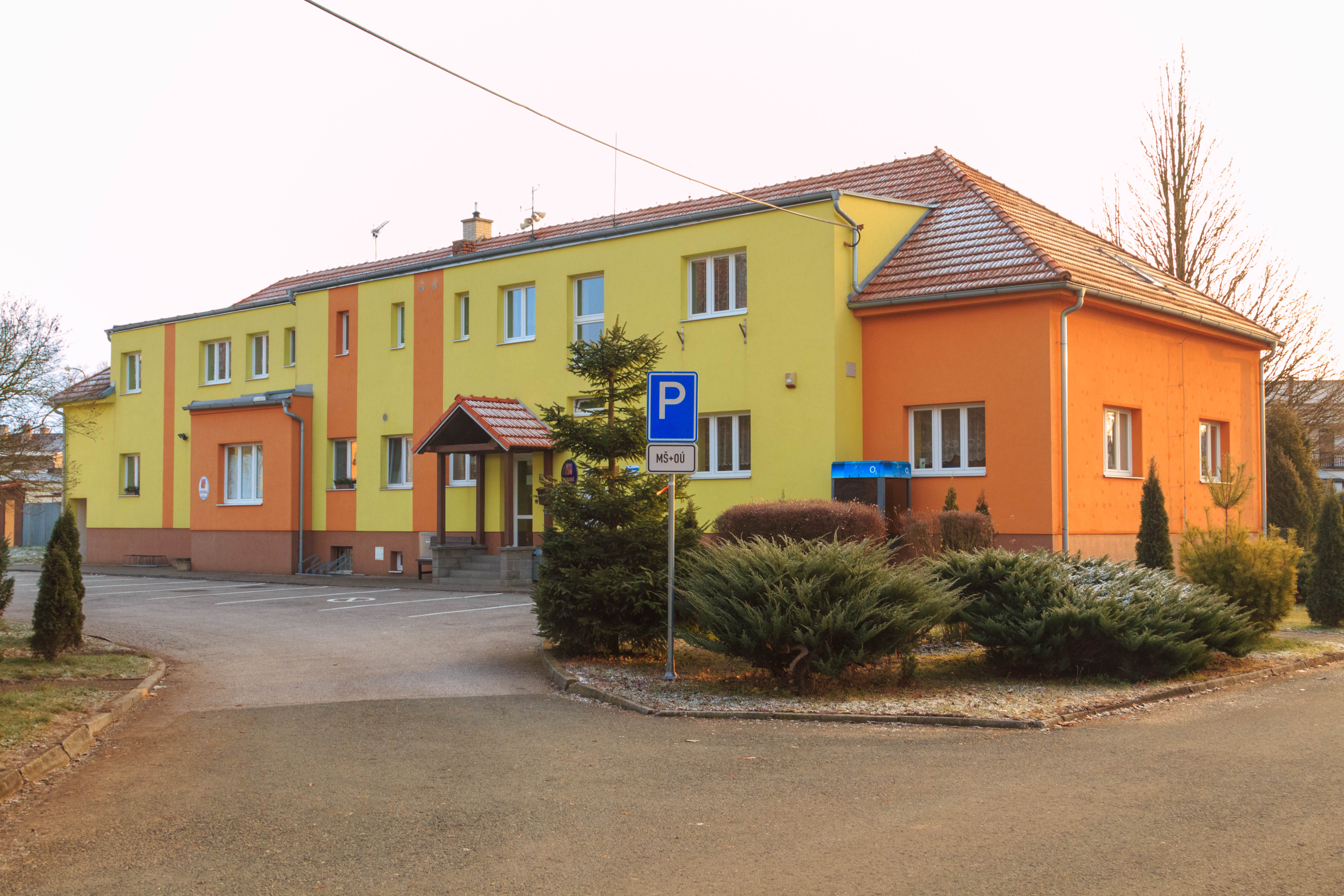
- Municipal office

- Flag Coat of arms

- Location in the Czech Republic
- Coordinates: 50°7′40″N 16°8′45″E
- Country: Czech Republic
- Region: Hradec Králové
- District: Rychnov nad Kněžnou
- First mentioned: 1398

Area
  - Total: 4.96 km^{2} (1.92 sq mi)
- Elevation: 259 m (850 ft)

Population (2026-01-01)
  - Total: 581
  - Density: 117/km^{2} (303/sq mi)
- Time zone: UTC+1 (CET)
  - Summer (DST): UTC+2 (CEST)
- Postal code: 517 41
- Website: www.obeccestice.cz

Čestice is a municipality and village in Rychnov nad Kněžnou District in the Hradec Králové Region of the Czech Republic. It has about 600 inhabitants.

== Administrative division ==
Čestice consists of two municipal parts (in brackets population according to the 2021 census):

- Čestice (542)
- Častolovické Horky (16)

== Demographics ==
Historical population
Year	Pop.	±%
1869	536	—
1880	533	−0.6%
1890	528	−0.9%
1900	531	+0.6%
1910	516	−2.8%
1921	473	−8.3%
1930	447	−5.5%
1950	373	−16.6%
1961	425	+13.9%
1970	415	−2.4%
1980	470	+13.3%
1991	460	−2.1%
2001	492	+7.0%
2011	545	+10.8%
2021	558	+2.4%
Source: Censuses
