= Bělá (Divoká Orlice) =

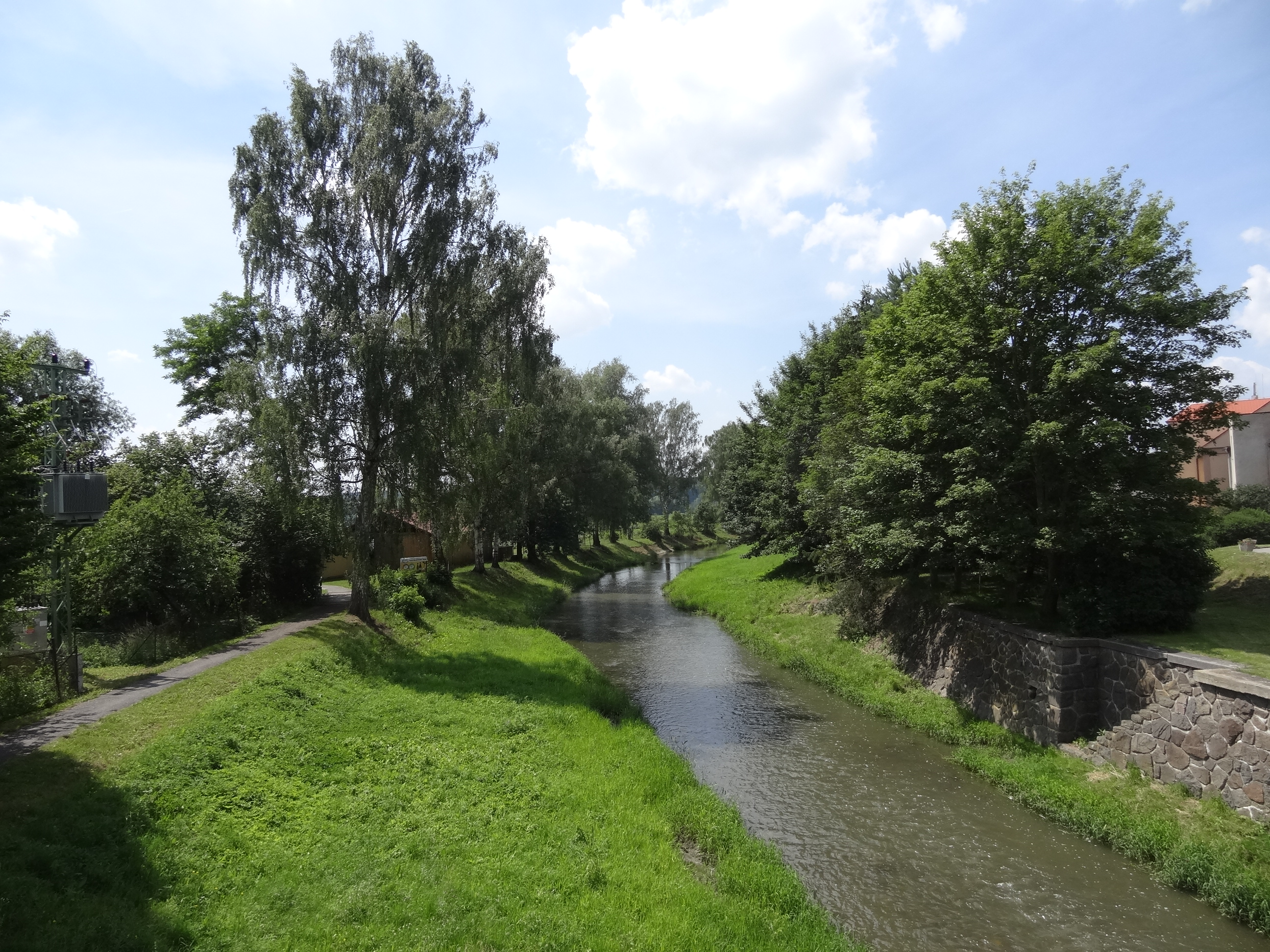
- The Bělá in Častolovice

Location
- Country: Czech Republic
- Region: Hradec Králové

Physical characteristics
- Source
  - location: Sedloňov, Orlické Mountains
  - coordinates: 50°20′53″N 16°21′27″E
  - elevation: 1,048 m (3,438 ft)
- Mouth
  - location: Divoká Orlice
  - coordinates: 50°7′20″N 16°10′18″E
  - elevation: 260 m (850 ft)
- Length: 40.6 km (25.2 mi)
- Basin size: 215.0 km^{2} (83.0 sq mi)
- Discharge
  - average: 2.39 m^{3}/s (84 cu ft/s) near estuary

Basin features
- Progression: Divoká Orlice→ Orlice→ Elbe→ North Sea

The Bělá (Czech pronunciation: [ˈbjɛlaː]) is a river in the Czech Republic, a right tributary of the Divoká Orlice River. It flows through the Hradec Králové Region. It is 40.6 km (25.2 mi) long.

== Etymology ==
Bělá is a common Czech name of watercourses, derived from the Czech word bílá (i.e. 'white'). Names of rivers with this colour in the name often referred to the stony or pebbly nature of the river bed.

== Characteristic ==
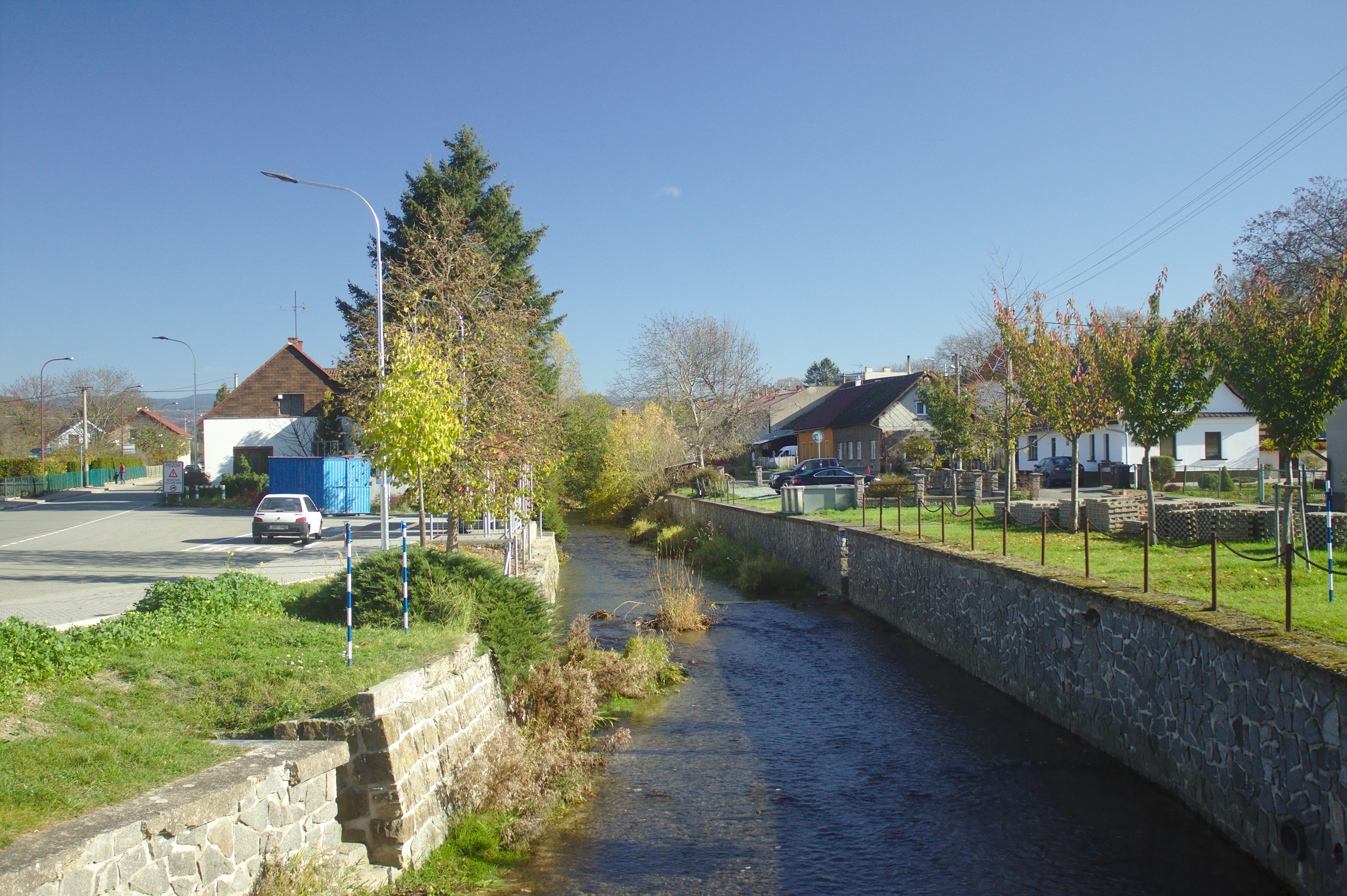
The Bělá in Kvasiny

The Bělá originates in the territory of Sedloňov in the Orlické Mountains below the mountain Velká Deštná at an elevation of 1,048 m (3,438 ft) and flows to Častolovice, where it enters the Divoká Orlice River at an elevation of 260 m (850 ft). It is 40.6 km (25.2 mi) long. Its drainage basin has an area of 215.0 km^{2} (83.0 sq mi). The average discharge at its mouth is 2.39 m3/s.

The longest tributaries of the Bělá are:

Tributary	Length (km)	River km	Side
Kněžná	26.7	2.7	left
Lokotský potok	8.7	3.7	left
Štědrý potok	8.6	1.3	left

== Course ==
The river flows through the municipal territories of Sedloňov, Deštné v Orlických horách, Liberk, Osečnice, Skuhrov nad Bělou, Kvasiny, Solnice, Černíkovice, Třebešov, Lično, Hřibiny-Ledská, Libel, Synkov-Slemeno and Častolovice.

== Bodies of water ==
There are 122 bodies of water in the basin area. The largest of them is the fishpond Černíkovický rybník with an area of 43 ha (110 acres), built on the Chobot Brook.

== Canals ==
About 1 km before the mouth, the river divides and part of the water continues through the Alba Canal. It is a 17.4 km (10.8 mi) long canal, connecting the Bělá with the Dědina River. The canal was gradually built from the end of the 14th century until 1550. It used to feed a system of fishponds, which no longer exist today. It is a historically important example of landscape modifications in the Middle Ages, which is protected as a cultural monument.

A cultural and technical monument is also the canal Dlouhá strouha, located in Kvasiny. It was built at the turn of the 15th and 16th centuries to power the large Černíkovice mill. The upper part of the canal was also used to supply several factories with water.
