= Paseky =

Paseky may refer to places in the Czech Republic:

- Paseky (Písek District), a municipality and village in the South Bohemian Region
- Paseky, a village and part of Horní Stropnice in the South Bohemian Region
- Paseky, a village and part of Hřibiny-Ledská in the Hradec Králové Region
- Paseky, a village and part of Osečany in the Central Bohemian Region
- Paseky, a village and part of Proseč in the Pardubice Region
- Paseky nad Jizerou, a municipality and village in the Liberec Region
