= Mathias Franz Graf von Chorinsky Freiherr von Ledske =

Czech bishop

Mathias Franz
- Bishop of Brno, Count of Chorinsky Baron of Ledske
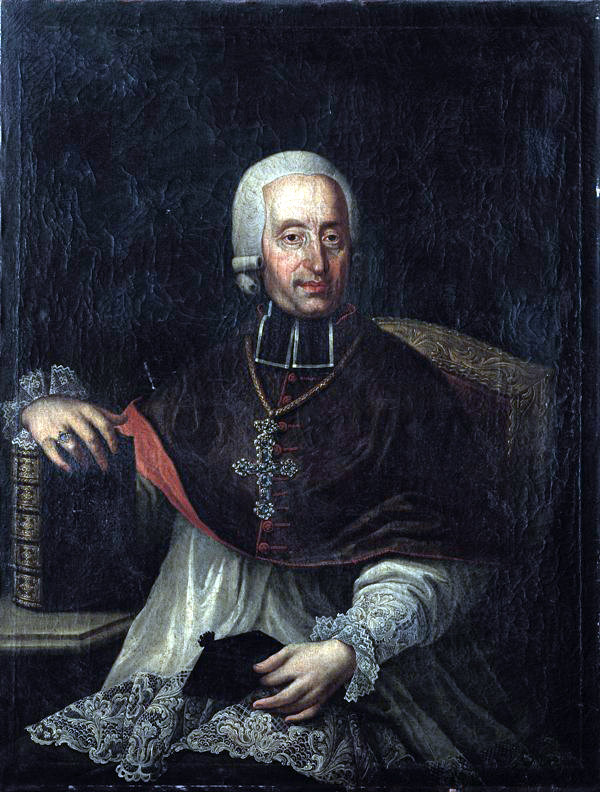
- Bishop Mathias Franz, Count of Chorinsky Baron of Ledske

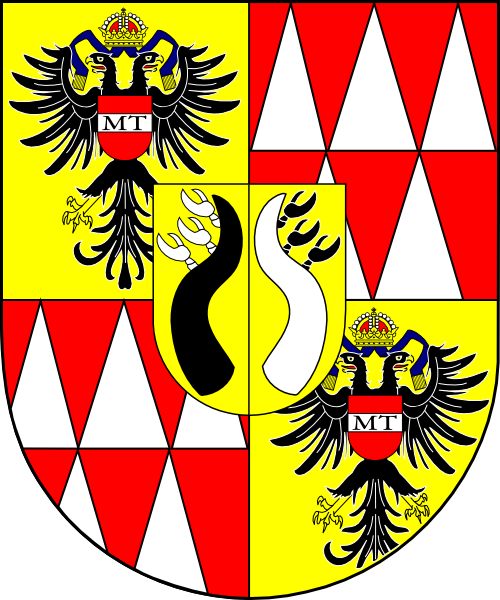
- Coat of arms: Personal coat of arms of 1st Bishop of Brno Mathias Franz, shield only represented (main coat of arms are that of the Brno diocese with Chorinsky-Ledske coat of arms shown in the centre.) Contemporary representation of the original coat of arms borne by house members before 1761.
- Full name: German: Mathias Franz Graf von Chorinsky Freiherr von Ledske; Czech: Matyáš František hrabě Chorinský svobodný pán z Ledské
- Born: 4 October 1720; Pačlavice, Moravia, Habsburg Empire
- Died: 30 October 1786 (aged 66); Kuřim, Moravia, Habsburg Empire
- Buried: Brno, Moravia, Habsburg Empire
- Family: House of Chorinsky (Chorinský); House of Ledske (Ledská)
- Father: Franz Karl Baron of Chorinsky and Ledske
- Mother: Maria Catherina Baroness Kottulinsky of Kottulin and Krzizkowitz

Mathias Franz Graf von Chorinsky Freiherr von Ledske (in English: Mathias Franz Count of Chorinsky Baron of Ledske; Latin: Mathias Franciscus Comes de Chorinsky Liber Baron de Ledske; Czech: Matyáš František hrabě z Chorinský svobodný pán z Ledské) (4 October 1720 in Pačlavice – 30 October 1786 in Kuřim, Moravia) was first Bishop of the Roman Catholic Diocese of Brno, Imperial and Royal senior Privy Counsellor of the Imperial and Royal Privy Council of the Habsburg monarchy and with his equally eminent brothers the first Counts of Chorinsky.

== Family history and biography ==
Mathias Franz was a descendant of an eminent and ancient Bohemian-Moravian-Silesian noble house well known in this region since the 15th century, with earlier origins leading from the Piast dynasty of Poland and a Chorynski branch of the "Abdank szlachta" nobility, in 1293 two noble Knight’s Babeslaus de Chorinsky and his son Laticus de Chorinsky served at the court of Henry V, Duke of Legnica and Duke of Silesia, seated in the Duchy of Silesia.

The earliest known ancestral seat or estate, among many others later acquired across the Bohemian-Moravian-Silesian lands, was Choryně with its dominion in the Zlín Region and fortress Ledske with its dominion in the Hradec Králové Region where today only remnants of the fortification can be found, today the village is named Ledská and is part of the Hřibiny-Ledská municipality in the present-day Czech Republic.

Already established and recognized for centuries, Mathias Franz together with his brothers were each noted for their own services to the Bohemian Crown and elevated as the first Counts of Chorinsky on 12 December 1761 by Empress of the Holy Roman Empire and Archduchess Maria Theresa in her sovereignty as Queen regnant of Bohemia.

On 3 April 1798 the House of Chorinsky-Ledske were named chief banner-bearers (German Oberst-Erblandpanier-Träger) of the peerage of Bohemia.

=== Career ===
Mathias Franz studied in Olomouc; on 5 April 1743 he was ordained a Roman Catholic priest; later that year he became Canon of the collegiate chapter of St. Peter and Paul Cathedral in Brno and in 1752 the Dean. On 16 October 1769 Mathias Franz received episcopal consecration as Titular Bishop of Samaria and Auxiliary Bishop of the Roman Catholic Diocese of Hradec Králové, in 1776 Auxiliary Bishop of Olomouc. Sponsored and nominated for Bishop of Brünn (Brno) on 18 May 1777 by then Empress regnant Maria Theresia of the Holy Roman Empire, Pope Pius VI confirmed his appointment on 5 December 1777 as the first bishop of the newly established Roman Catholic Diocese of Brno, and in that same year he was officially installed in that city. In 1778 he became a senior privy counsellor (German title k.u.k. Wirklicher Geheimer Rat, roughly "imperial and royal right trusted counsellor") in the Imperial and Royal (German k.u.k.) Privy Council of the Habsburg monarchy.

=== Parents ===
His parents were Franz Karl Baron of Chorinsky and Ledske and first wife Maria Catherina Baroness Kottulinsky of Kottulin and Krzizkowitz. From his father's first marriage stem four sons and three daughters, and upon the death of his first wife, one son from his father's second marriage to Maria Anna Countess of Hallweil. His father was Imperial and Royal Chamberlain (German title k.u.k. Kämmerer) and Counsellor (German k.u.k. Rat) on the Imperial and Royal Council of the Habsburg monarchy, as well as Imperial Governor of the Hradiště region in the Margraviate of Moravia, and Lord of the principalities Veselí and Pačlavice.

== Coat of arms ==
Blazon, altered and adopted post-1761: Gold (Or) shield, with two bison horns centred within, the right bison horn is black (Sable) with three silver (Argent) crayfish claws attached outwards, the left bison horn is silver (Argent) with three black (Sable) crayfish claws attached outwards, the shield (or mantel surrounding if present) is crowned with a nine pearl count-coronet ranking. The coat of arms is often found with a mantel surrounding; a purple cloak with ermine lining, tasselled and fringed with gold (Or) string, and shield supporters being two human male figures.

Some variations of the coat of arms are also seen with the addition of the bison horns represented again surmounted above a two-pearled leafed crown resting on a front facing barred Knight's helmet with jewelled necklace (a similar blazon as found on the original coat of arms borne prior to addition of the count-coronet ranking post-1761).

== Miscellaneous ==
As name spellings were historically fairly fluid, especially given the different languages used in the region, the main name of "Chorinsky" is also sometimes found in documents as Chorynski, Chorensky, Chorenski, Chorynsky and Chorinska (the last being a female form), and "Ledske" is found as Ledska, Ledetz and Letske.

Gloria, Princess of Thurn and Taxis (née Gräfin von Schönburg-Glauchau), of the German Princely House of Thurn und Taxis, has paternal ancestors from the House of Chorinsky-Ledske. Her paternal great-great-grandfather is Victor Paul Graf von Chorinsky Freiherr von Ledske (1838–1901) and her paternal great-grandmother is Franziska (Fanny) Anna Gräfin von Chorinsky Freiin von Ledske (1876–1963).
