= Solnice =

- Town
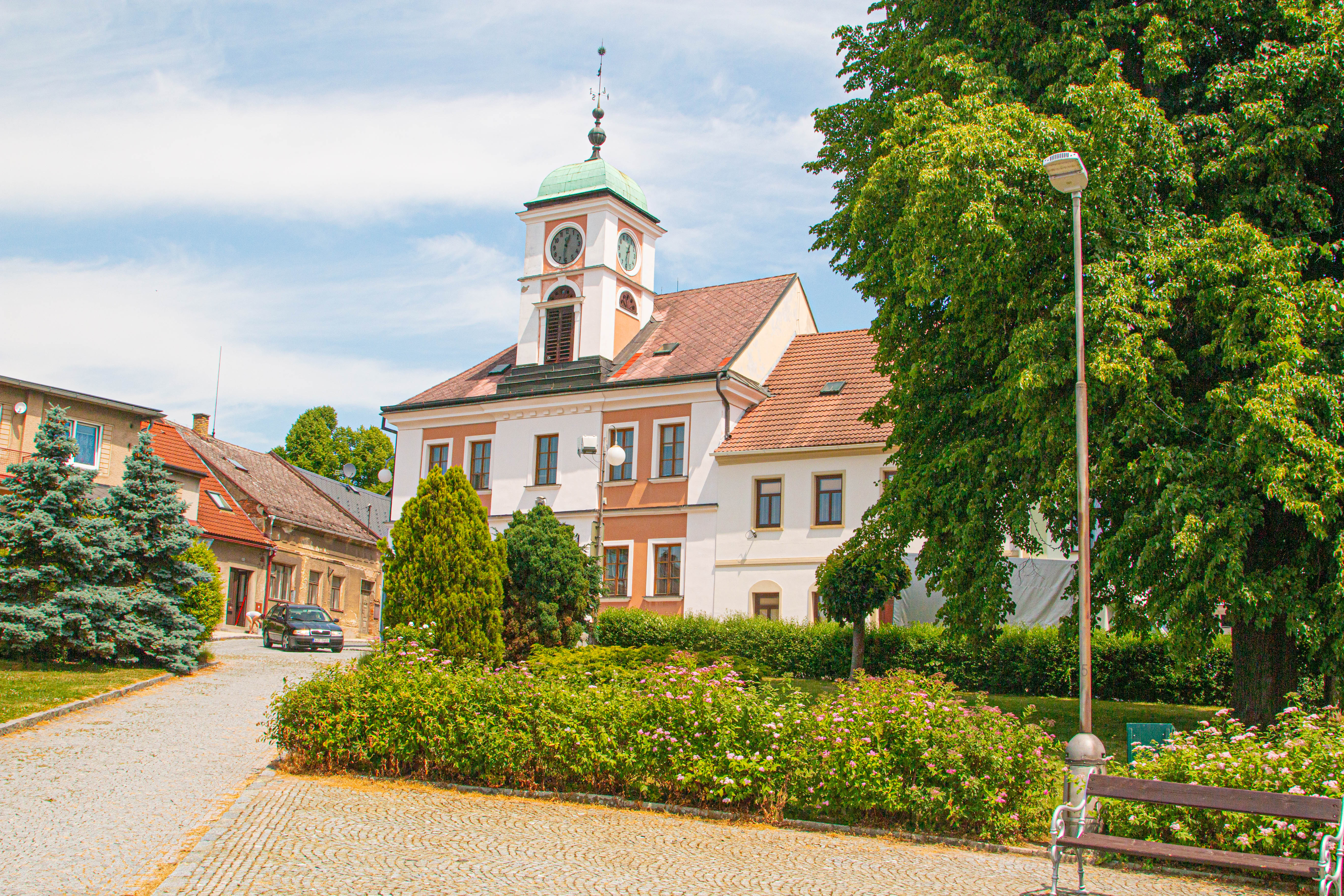
- Town hall

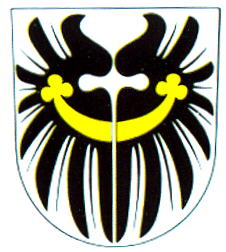
- Coat of arms

- Location in the Czech Republic
- Coordinates: 50°12′15″N 16°14′17″E
- Country: Czech Republic
- Region: Hradec Králové
- District: Rychnov nad Kněžnou
- First mentioned: 1321

Government
  - Mayor: Jan Hostinský

Area
  - Total: 12.66 km^{2} (4.89 sq mi)
- Elevation: 332 m (1,089 ft)

Population (2026-01-01)
  - Total: 2,515
  - Density: 198.7/km^{2} (514.5/sq mi)
- Time zone: UTC+1 (CET)
  - Summer (DST): UTC+2 (CEST)
- Postal code: 517 01
- Website: www.solnice.cz

Solnice (Czech pronunciation: [ˈsolɲɪtsɛ]; German: Solnitz) is a town in Rychnov nad Kněžnou District in the Hradec Králové Region of the Czech Republic. It has about 2,500 inhabitants.

== Administrative division ==
Solnice consists of two municipal parts (in brackets population according to the 2021 census):

- Solnice (1,918)
- Ještětice (270)

== Etymology ==
The word solnice (derived from the Czech word sůl, i.e. 'salt') denoted a place where salt was traded, stored or taxed.

== Geography ==
Solnice is located about 5 kilometres (3 mi) northeast of Rychnov nad Kněžnou and 28 km (17 mi) east of Hradec Králové. It lies mostly in the Orlice Table, only small parts of the municipal territory in the east extend into the Orlické Foothills. The highest point is at 390 m (1,280 ft) above sea level. The Bělá River flows through the town.

== History ==
Solnice was probably founded on a trade route from western and southern lands to the Baltic region. The first written mention of Solnice is from 1321, when it was owned by Jan of Meziříčí. In 1386, the settlement obtained various rights and began to be referred to as a town.

== Demographics ==
Historical population

Year	Pop.	±%
1869	2,013	—
1880	2,110	+4.8%
1890	1,848	−12.4%
1900	1,994	+7.9%
1910	2,068	+3.7%

Year	Pop.	±%
1921	1,889	−8.7%
1930	2,009	+6.4%
1950	1,803	−10.3%
1961	1,964	+8.9%
1970	2,113	+7.6%

Year	Pop.	±%
1980	2,193	+3.8%
1991	2,086	−4.9%
2001	2,085	−0.0%
2011	2,171	+4.1%
2021	2,188	+0.8%

Source: Censuses

== Transport ==
The I/14 road (the section from Náchod to Ústí nad Orlicí) runs through the town.

Solnice is served by two train stations and stops called Solnice and Solnice zastávka, located on the railway line from Hradec Králové that terminates here. However, the Solnice station is situated outside the premises of the town, in neighbouring Kvasiny.

== Sights ==
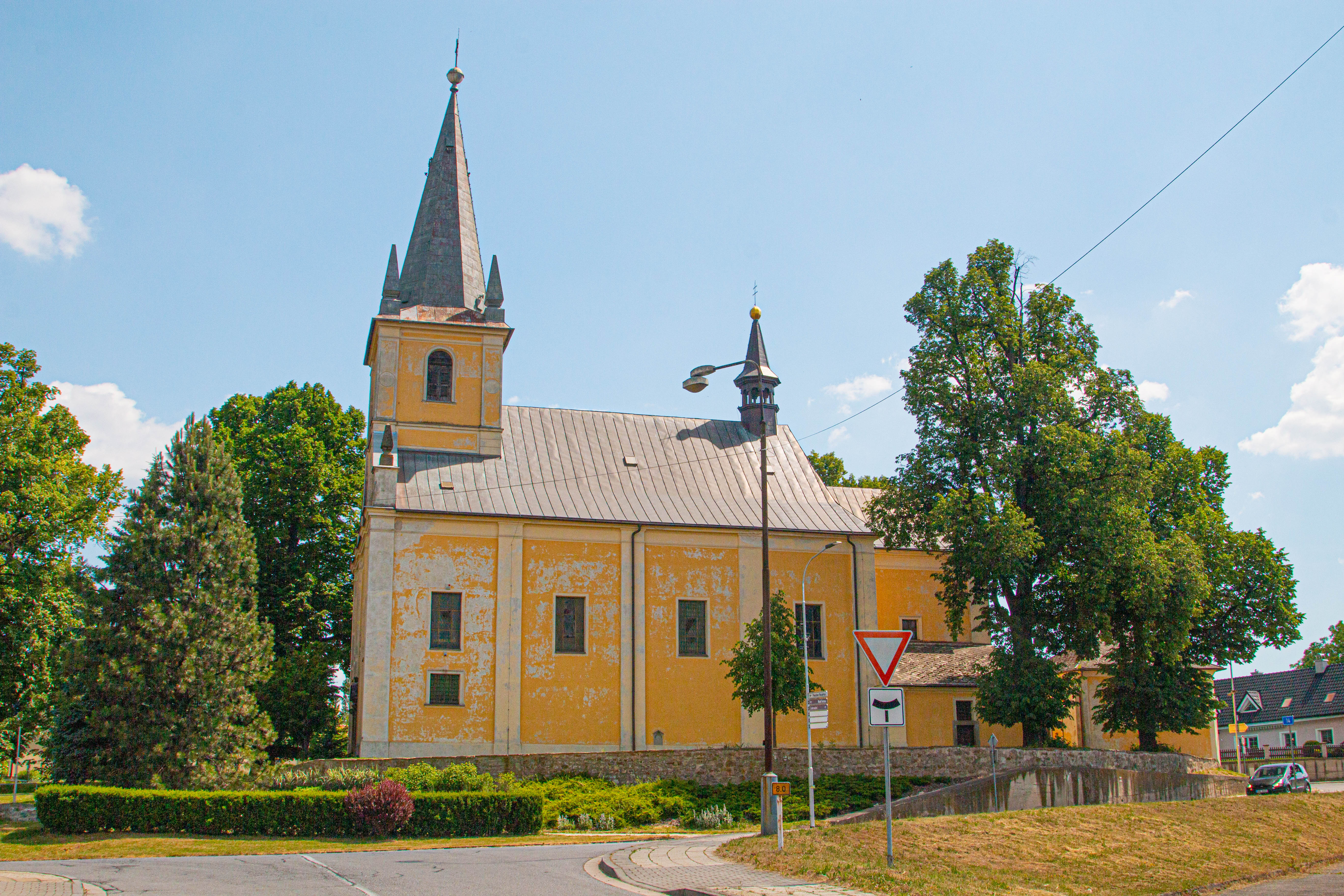
Church of the Beheading of Saint John the Baptist

The main landmark of Solnice is the Church of the Beheading of Saint John the Baptist. It was built in the early Baroque style in 1681–1686, modified into its present pseudo-style form in 1869–1870.

An architectural landmark of the town square is the town hall. It was built in the Empire style in the first half of the 19th century.

A cultural monument is the former Renaissance fortress, built in 1560–1565. Today, the building serves as a hostel.
