= Pačlavice =

- Municipality
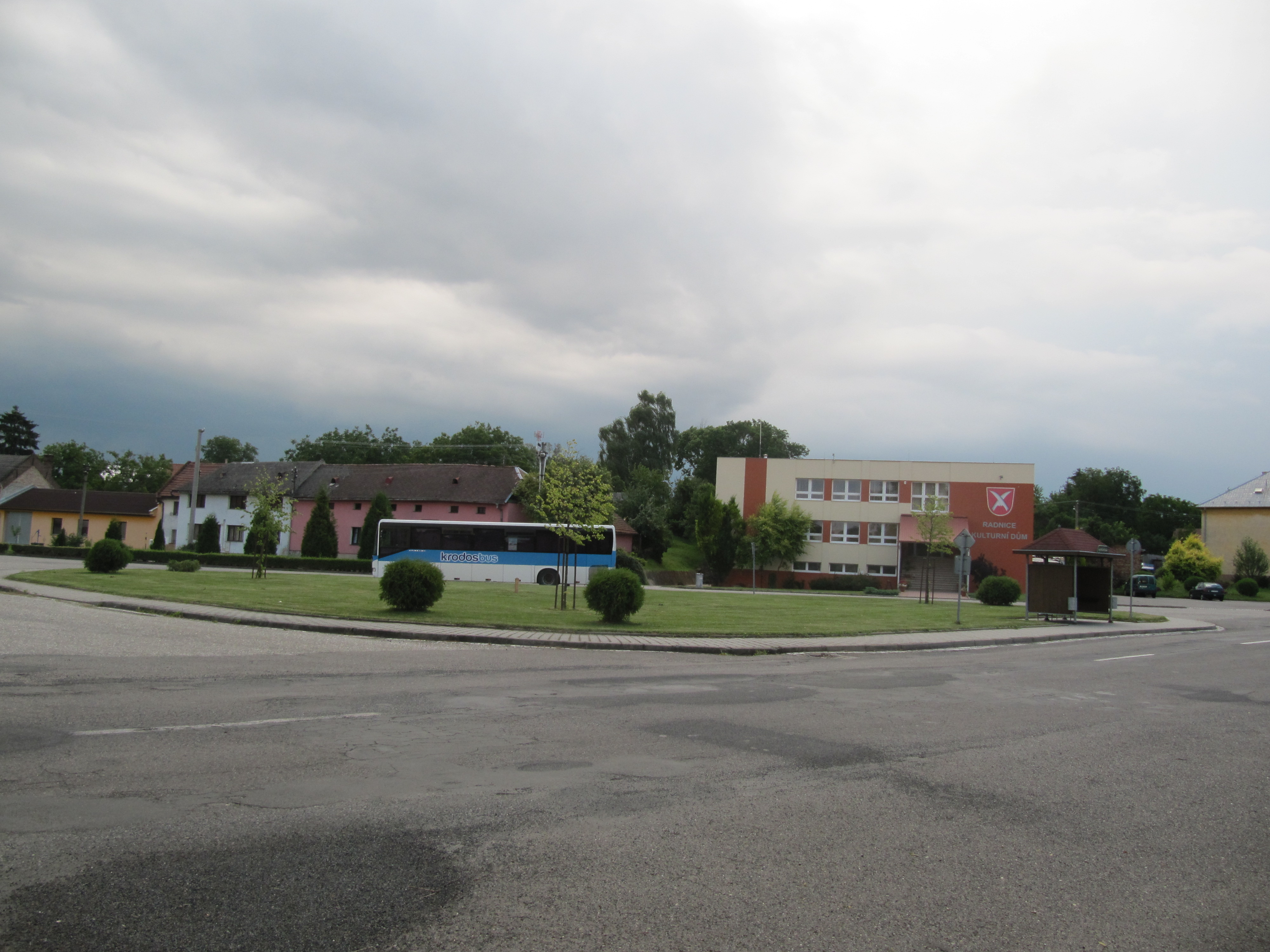
- Centre of Pačlavice

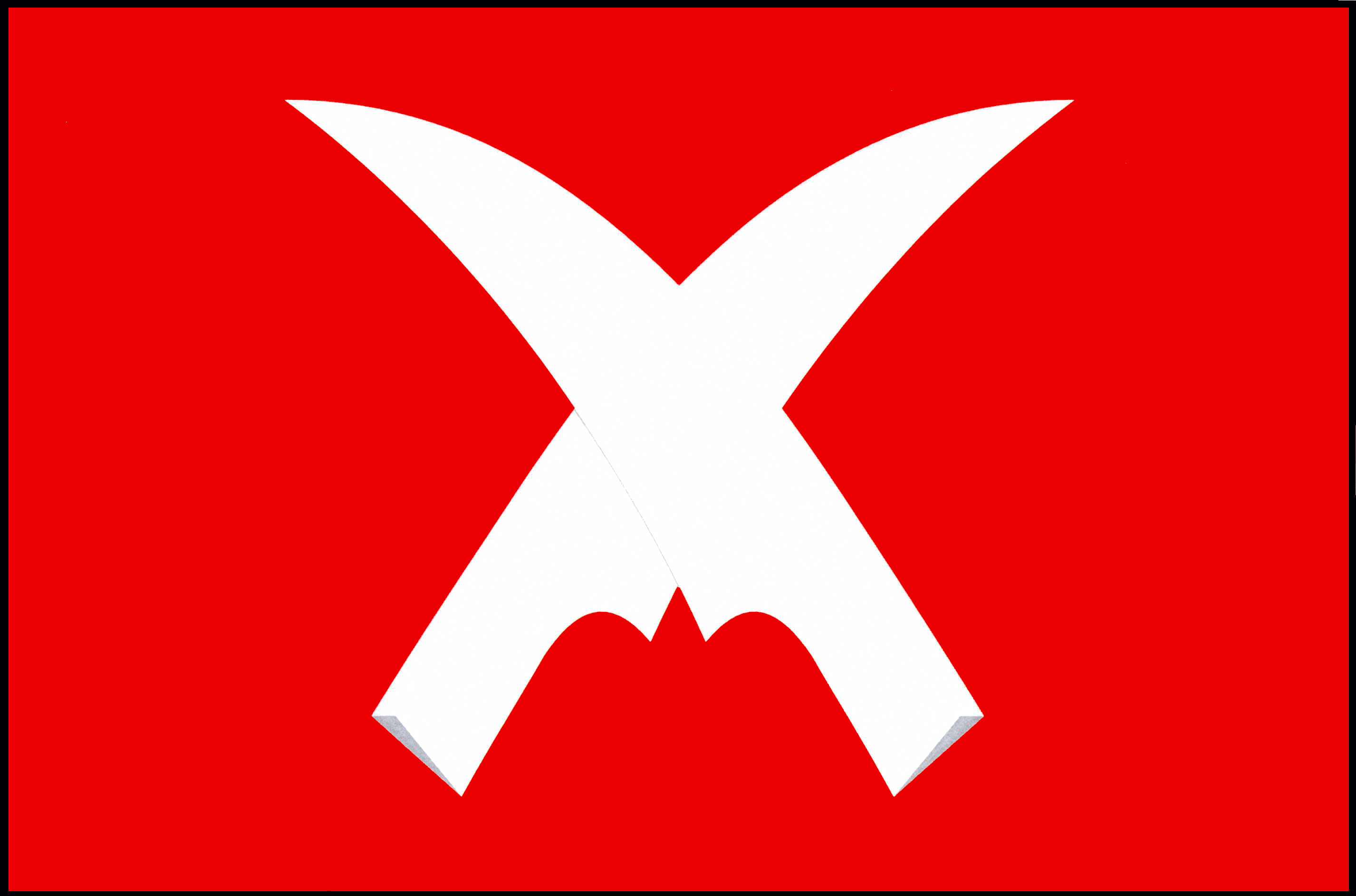
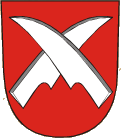
- Flag Coat of arms

- Location in the Czech Republic
- Coordinates: 49°15′35″N 17°10′8″E
- Country: Czech Republic
- Region: Zlín
- District: Kroměříž
- First mentioned: 1141

Area
  - Total: 15.50 km^{2} (5.98 sq mi)
- Elevation: 260 m (850 ft)

Population (2026-01-01)
  - Total: 832
  - Density: 53.7/km^{2} (139/sq mi)
- Time zone: UTC+1 (CET)
  - Summer (DST): UTC+2 (CEST)
- Postal code: 768 34
- Website: www.obecpaclavice.cz

Pačlavice (German: Patschlawitz) is a municipality and village in Kroměříž District in the Zlín Region of the Czech Republic. It has about 800 inhabitants.

Pačlavice lies approximately 18 kilometres (11 mi) west of Kroměříž, 37 km (23 mi) west of Zlín and 218 km (135 mi) south-east of Prague.

== Administrative division ==
Pačlavice consists of three municipal parts (in brackets population according to the 2021 census):

- Pačlavice (463)
- Lhota (175)
- Pornice (214)

== Demographics ==
Historical population
Year	Pop.	±%
1869	1,435	—
1880	1,506	+4.9%
1890	1,633	+8.4%
1900	1,667	+2.1%
1910	1,645	−1.3%
1921	1,713	+4.1%
1930	1,644	−4.0%
1950	1,344	−18.2%
1961	1,450	+7.9%
1970	1,286	−11.3%
1980	1,132	−12.0%
1991	1,000	−11.7%
2001	878	−12.2%
2011	836	−4.8%
2021	852	+1.9%
Source: Censuses

== Notable people ==
- Mathias Franz Graf von Chorinsky Freiherr von Ledske (1720–1786), Bishop of Brno
