= Černíkovice (Rychnov nad Kněžnou District) =

- Municipality
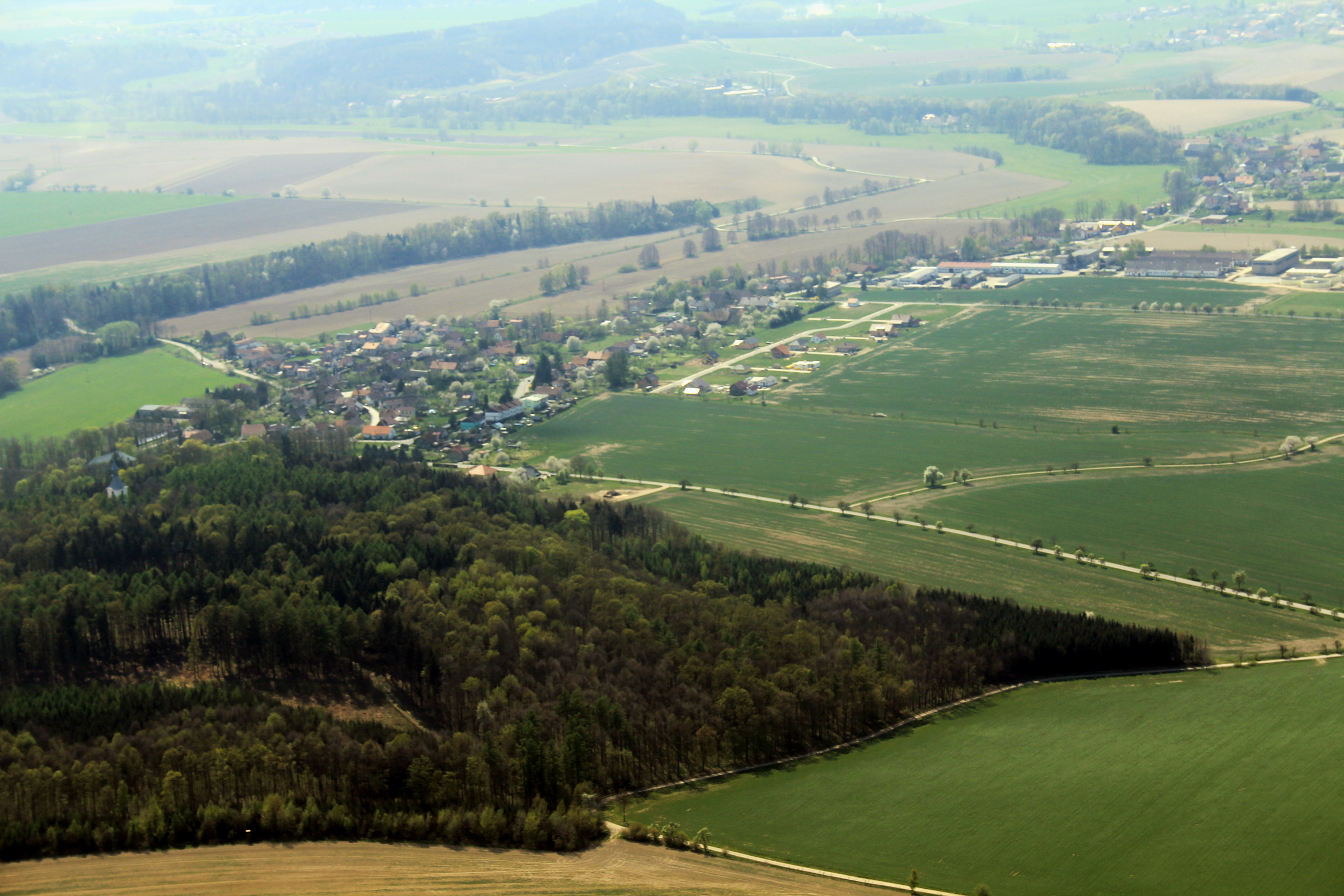
- Aerial view

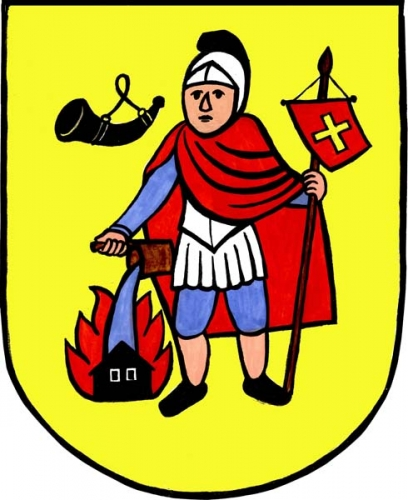
- Flag Coat of arms

- Location in the Czech Republic
- Coordinates: 50°11′12″N 16°12′25″E
- Country: Czech Republic
- Region: Hradec Králové
- District: Rychnov nad Kněžnou
- First mentioned: 1369

Area
  - Total: 12.50 km^{2} (4.83 sq mi)
- Elevation: 316 m (1,037 ft)

Population (2026-01-01)
  - Total: 809
  - Density: 64.7/km^{2} (168/sq mi)
- Time zone: UTC+1 (CET)
  - Summer (DST): UTC+2 (CEST)
- Postal codes: 516 01, 517 04
- Website: www.cernikovice.cz

Černíkovice is a municipality and village in Rychnov nad Kněžnou District in the Hradec Králové Region of the Czech Republic. It has about 800 inhabitants.

== Administrative division ==
Černíkovice consists of two municipal parts (in brackets population according to the 2021 census):

- Černíkovice (662)
- Domašín (145)

== Geography ==
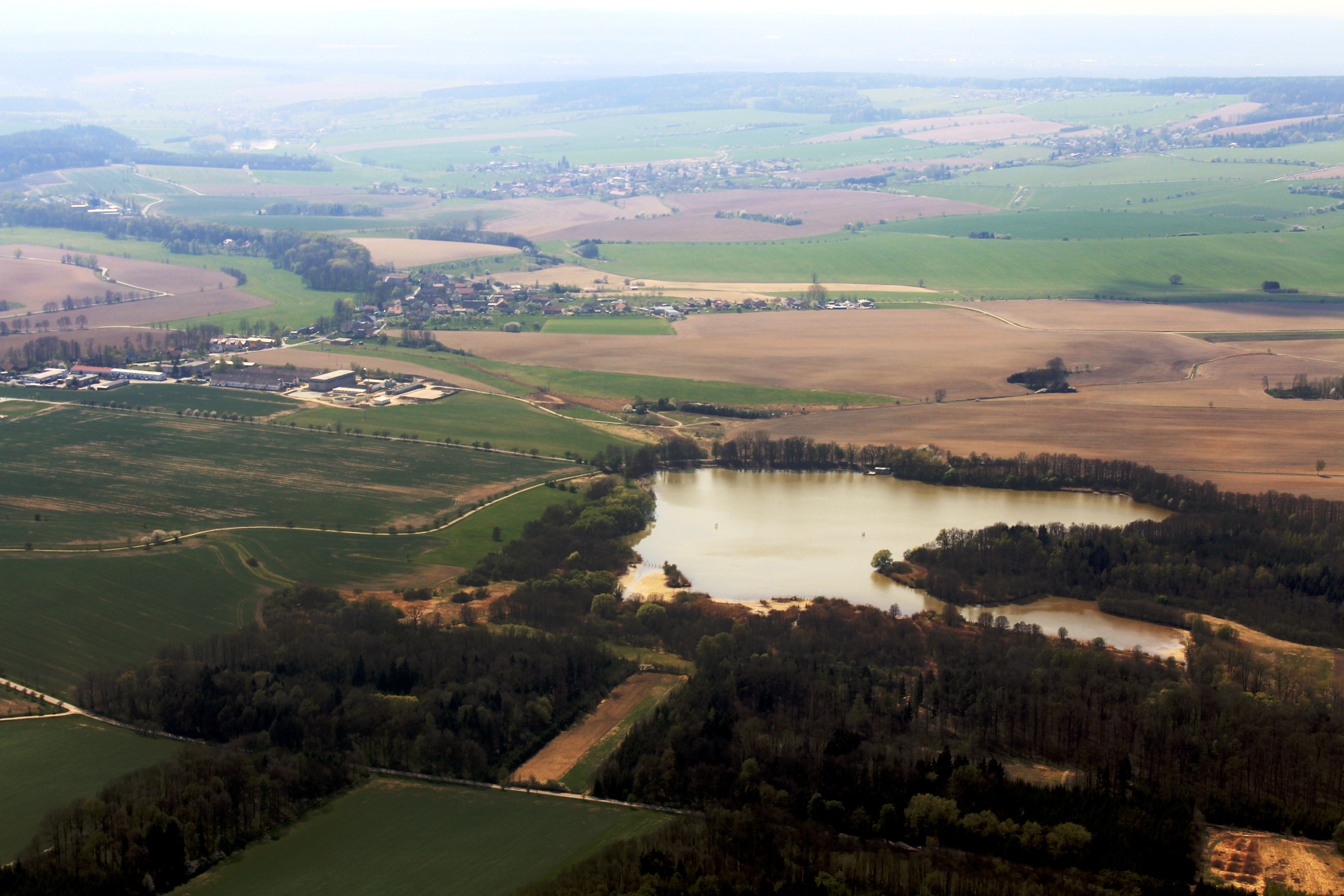
View over Černíkovický rybník

Černíkovice is located about 5 kilometres (3 mi) northwest of Rychnov nad Kněžnou and 26 km (16 mi) east of Hradec Králové. It lies in the Orlice Table. The highest point of the municipality is the hill Na Hraběnce at 358 m (1,175 ft) above sea level. The Bělá River flows through the municipality. There are four fishponds in the municipal territory, the largest of which is Černíkovický rybník.

== Demographics ==
Historical population
Year	Pop.	±%
1869	981	—
1880	1,039	+5.9%
1890	991	−4.6%
1900	1,010	+1.9%
1910	983	−2.7%
1921	995	+1.2%
1930	884	−11.2%
1950	739	−16.4%
1961	786	+6.4%
1970	776	−1.3%
1980	781	+0.6%
1991	749	−4.1%
2001	758	+1.2%
2011	683	−9.9%
2021	807	+18.2%
Source: Censuses
