= Kuřim =

- Town
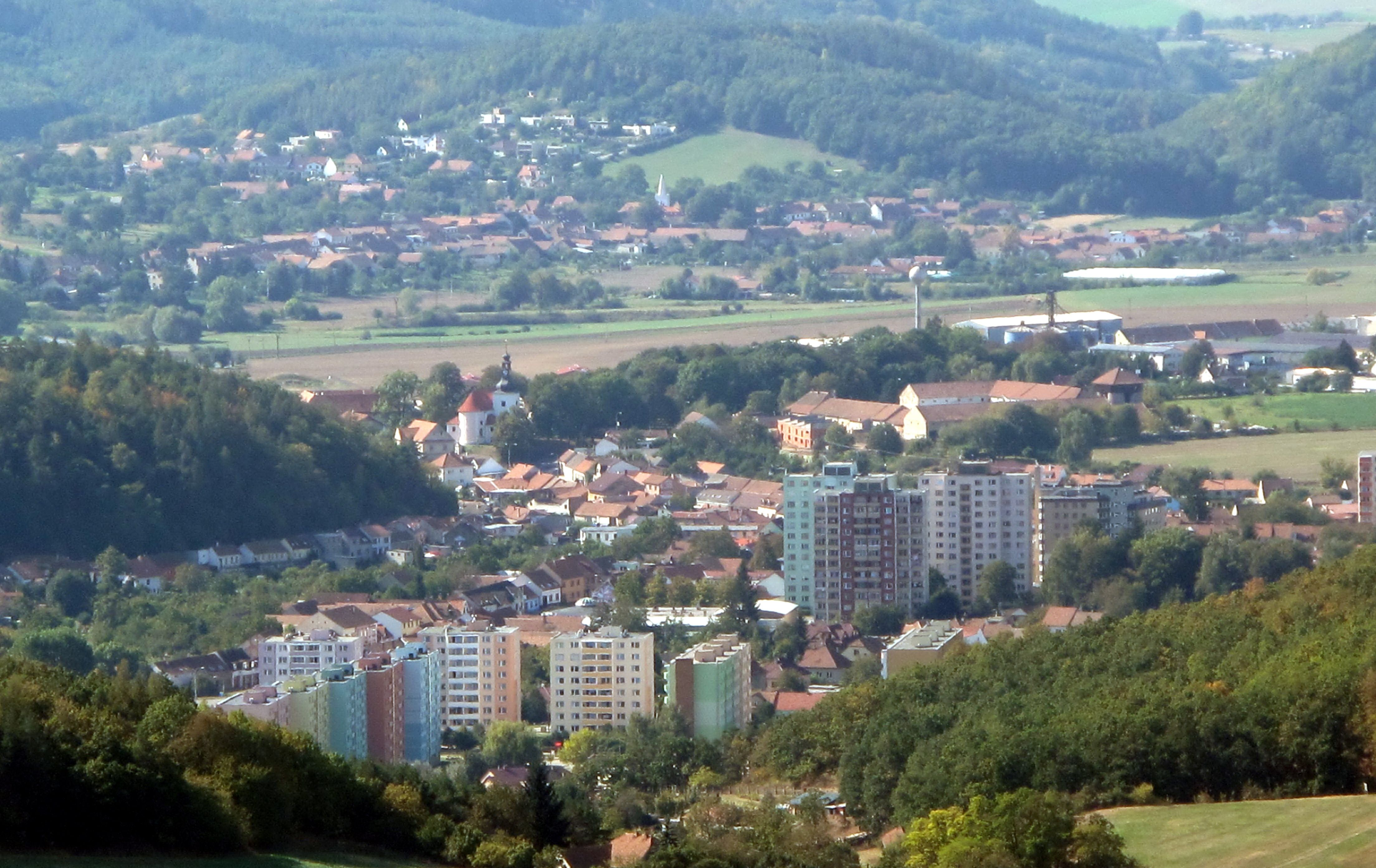
- General view

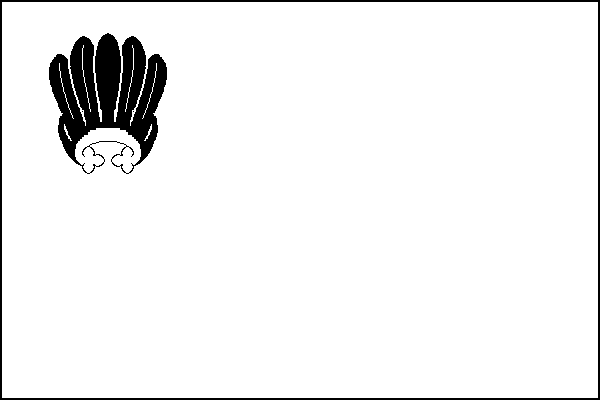
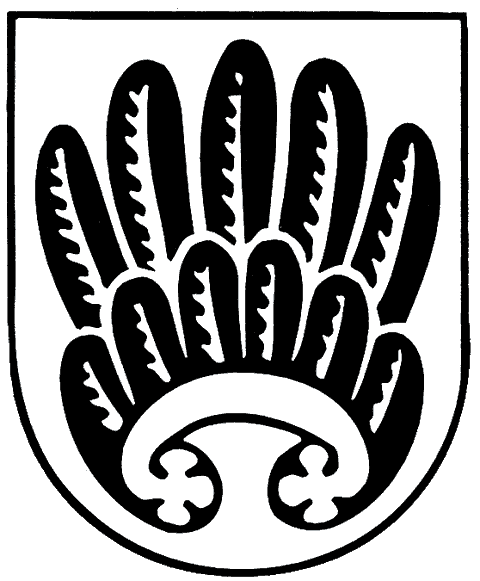
- Flag Coat of arms

- Location in the Czech Republic
- Coordinates: 49°17′55″N 16°31′53″E
- Country: Czech Republic
- Region: South Moravian
- District: Brno-Country
- First mentioned: 1226

Government
  - Mayor: Drago Sukalovský (STAN)

Area
  - Total: 17.20 km^{2} (6.64 sq mi)
- Elevation: 286 m (938 ft)

Population (2026-01-01)
  - Total: 11,499
  - Density: 668.5/km^{2} (1,732/sq mi)
- Time zone: UTC+1 (CET)
  - Summer (DST): UTC+2 (CEST)
- Postal code: 664 34
- Website: www.kurim.cz

Kuřim (Czech pronunciation: [ˈkur̝ɪm]; German: Gurein) is a town in Brno-Country District in the South Moravian Region of the Czech Republic. It has about 11,000 inhabitants, making it the most populous town of Brno-Country District. Kuřim was founded in the 13th century at the latest, but it became a town only in 1964. The town is known for the Kuřim Prison.

== Geography ==
Kuřim is located about 12 kilometres (7 mi) north of Brno. It lies mostly in the Bobrava Highlands, only the eastern part of the municipal territory extends into the Drahany Highlands. The highest point is the hill Kuřimská hora at 435 m (1,427 ft) above sea level. The town is situated at the confluence of streams Kuřimka and Luční potok.

== History ==
The first written mention of Kuřim is from 1226, when King Ottokar I issued a charter about the payment of tithes to the Church of Saints Peter and Paul. The settlement was probably founded in the 12th century during the colonisation by Přemyslids. From 1464 to 1527, it was a property of Lords of Boskovice, then it was bought by the Nekeš family. From 1547, the village was owned by the city of Brno. In 1570, Kuřim was promoted to a market town, but later lost the title. During the Thirty Years' War, Kuřim was badly damaged several times by the Swedish army. It was again promoted to a market town in 1785.

In 1964, Kuřim was promoted to a town.

== Demographics ==
Historical population

| Year | Pop. | ±% |
|---|---|---|
| 1869 | 1,403 | — |
| 1880 | 1,535 | +9.4% |
| 1890 | 1,585 | +3.3% |
| 1900 | 1,610 | +1.6% |
| 1910 | 1,874 | +16.4% |

| Year | Pop. | ±% |
|---|---|---|
| 1921 | 2,024 | +8.0% |
| 1930 | 2,844 | +40.5% |
| 1950 | 4,131 | +45.3% |
| 1961 | 5,944 | +43.9% |
| 1970 | 7,076 | +19.0% |

| Year | Pop. | ±% |
|---|---|---|
| 1980 | 7,695 | +8.7% |
| 1991 | 8,621 | +12.0% |
| 2001 | 8,930 | +3.6% |
| 2011 | 11,540 | +29.2% |
| 2021 | 11,485 | −0.5% |

Source: Censuses

== Economy ==
In the northern part of the town is an industrial zone. The largest employer is TE Connectivity Czech, a branch of TE Connectivity.

There is a prison for convicted men aged 18 years and more on the outskirts of the town. It has a capacity of 498 prisoners and employs 260 people. It is the only prison in the Czech Republic that specialises in prisoners undergoing sexological treatment and those with personality and behavioural disorders.

== Transport ==
Kuřim is located on the railway lines Tišnov–Židlochovice, Brno–Křižanov and Tišnov–Hustopeče.

== Sights ==
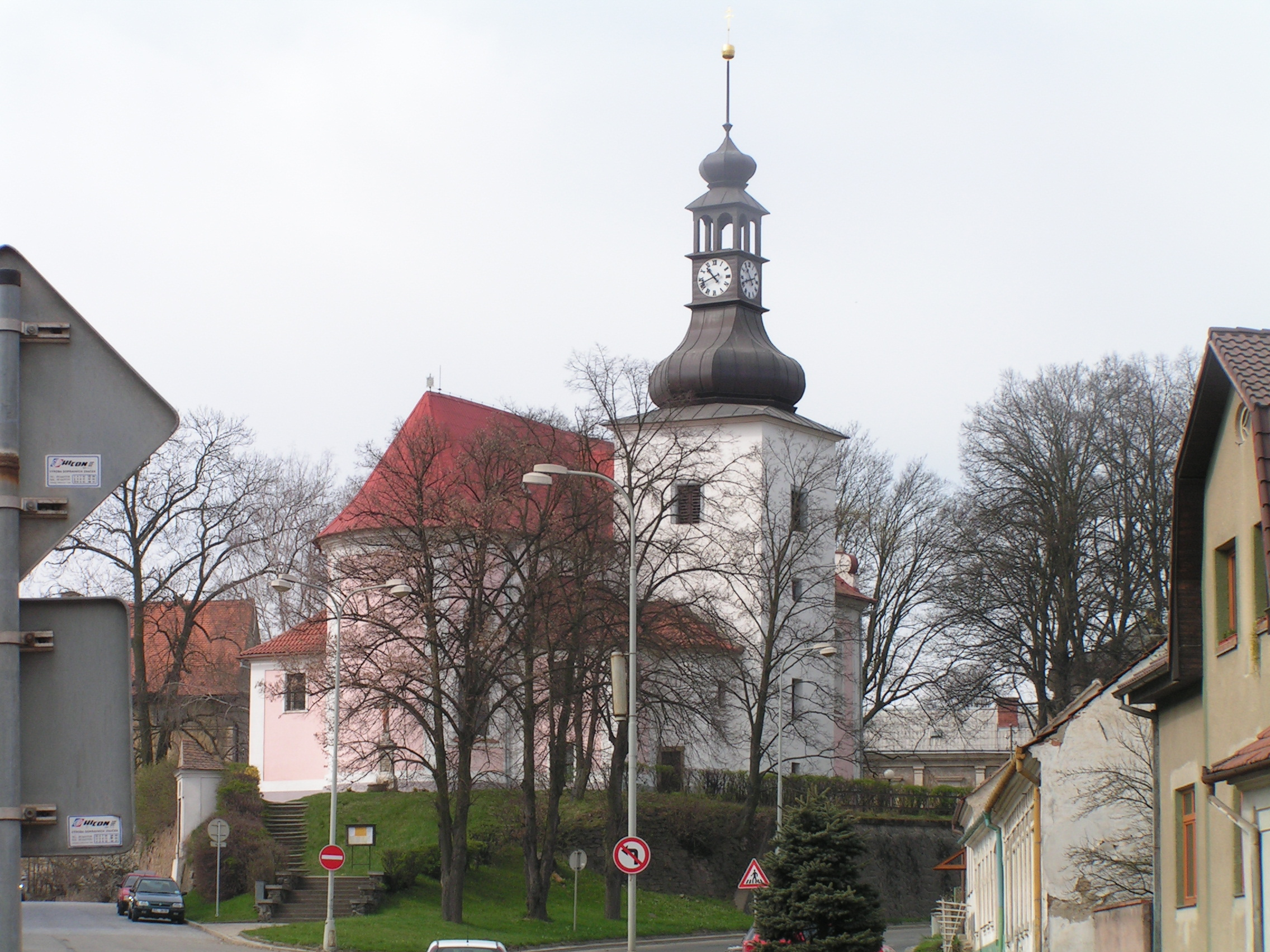
Church of Saint Mary Magdalene

The Church of Saint Mary Magdalene was founded in 1226. It was originally a Romanesque building. After it was burned down in the Thirty Years' War, it was reconstructed in its today's late Baroque form in 1766–1772. The rectory was also founded in 1226. The original wooden structure was rebuilt after 1806.

The original medieval fortress next to the church was rebuilt into a Renaissance residence in 1592–1594. Today the Kuřim Castle houses a school and its courtyard is used for cultural purposes.

On the hill Kuřimská hora is a water chapel of John of Nepomuk, probably built in 1722. The statue of Saint Florian on the town square is from 1679.

== Notable people ==
- Mathias Franz Graf von Chorinsky Freiherr von Ledske (1720–1786), Bishop of Brno; died here
- Vladimír Petlák (1946–1999), volleyball player
- Danuše Nerudová (born 1979), economist and university professor; lives here

== Twin towns – sister cities ==
Kuřim is twinned with:

- Niepołomice, Poland
- Stupava, Slovakia
