= Sedloňov =

- Municipality
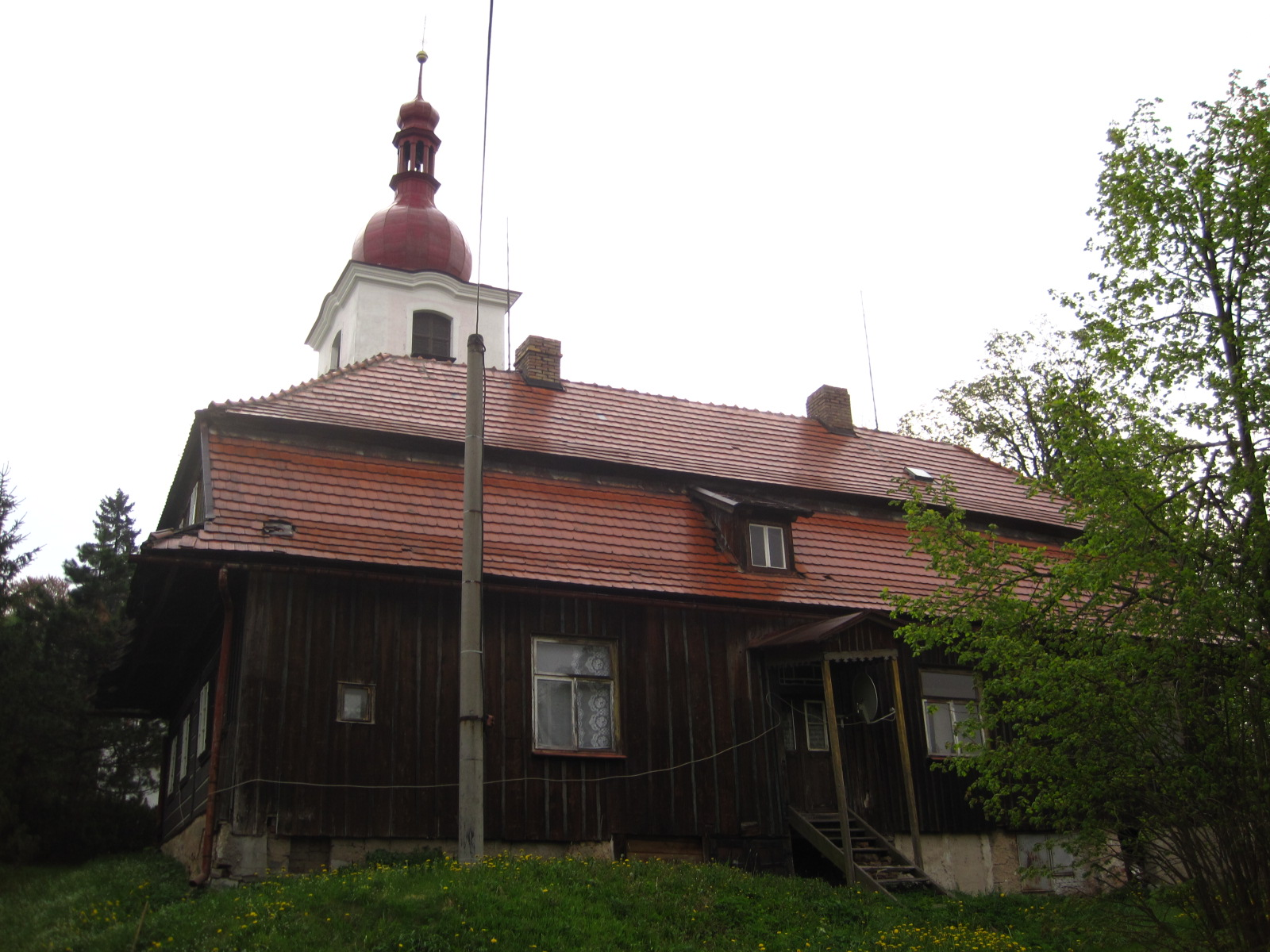
- View towards the Church of All Saints

- Flag Coat of arms

- Location in the Czech Republic
- Coordinates: 50°20′18″N 16°18′56″E
- Country: Czech Republic
- Region: Hradec Králové
- District: Rychnov nad Kněžnou
- First mentioned: 1654

Area
  - Total: 19.01 km^{2} (7.34 sq mi)
- Elevation: 650 m (2,130 ft)

Population (2026-01-01)
  - Total: 207
  - Density: 10.9/km^{2} (28.2/sq mi)
- Time zone: UTC+1 (CET)
  - Summer (DST): UTC+2 (CEST)
- Postal code: 517 91
- Website: www.sedlonov.cz

Sedloňov (German: Sattel) is a municipality and village in Rychnov nad Kněžnou District in the Hradec Králové Region of the Czech Republic. It has about 200 inhabitants. The Dědina and Bělá rivers originate in the municipal territory.

== Administrative division ==
Sedloňov consists of two municipal parts (in brackets population according to the 2021 census):

- Sedloňov (212)
- Polom (10)

== Demographics ==
Historical population
| Year | Pop. | ±% |
|---|---|---|
| 1869 | 1,833 | — |
| 1880 | 1,781 | −2.8% |
| 1890 | 1,733 | −2.7% |
| 1900 | 1,568 | −9.5% |
| 1910 | 1,416 | −9.7% |
| 1921 | 1,236 | −12.7% |
| 1930 | 1,140 | −7.8% |
| 1950 | 557 | −51.1% |
| 1961 | 438 | −21.4% |
| 1970 | 377 | −13.9% |
| 1980 | 339 | −10.1% |
| 1991 | 315 | −7.1% |
| 2001 | 262 | −16.8% |
| 2011 | 207 | −21.0% |
| 2021 | 222 | +7.2% |
Source: Censuses
