= Častolovice =

- Market town
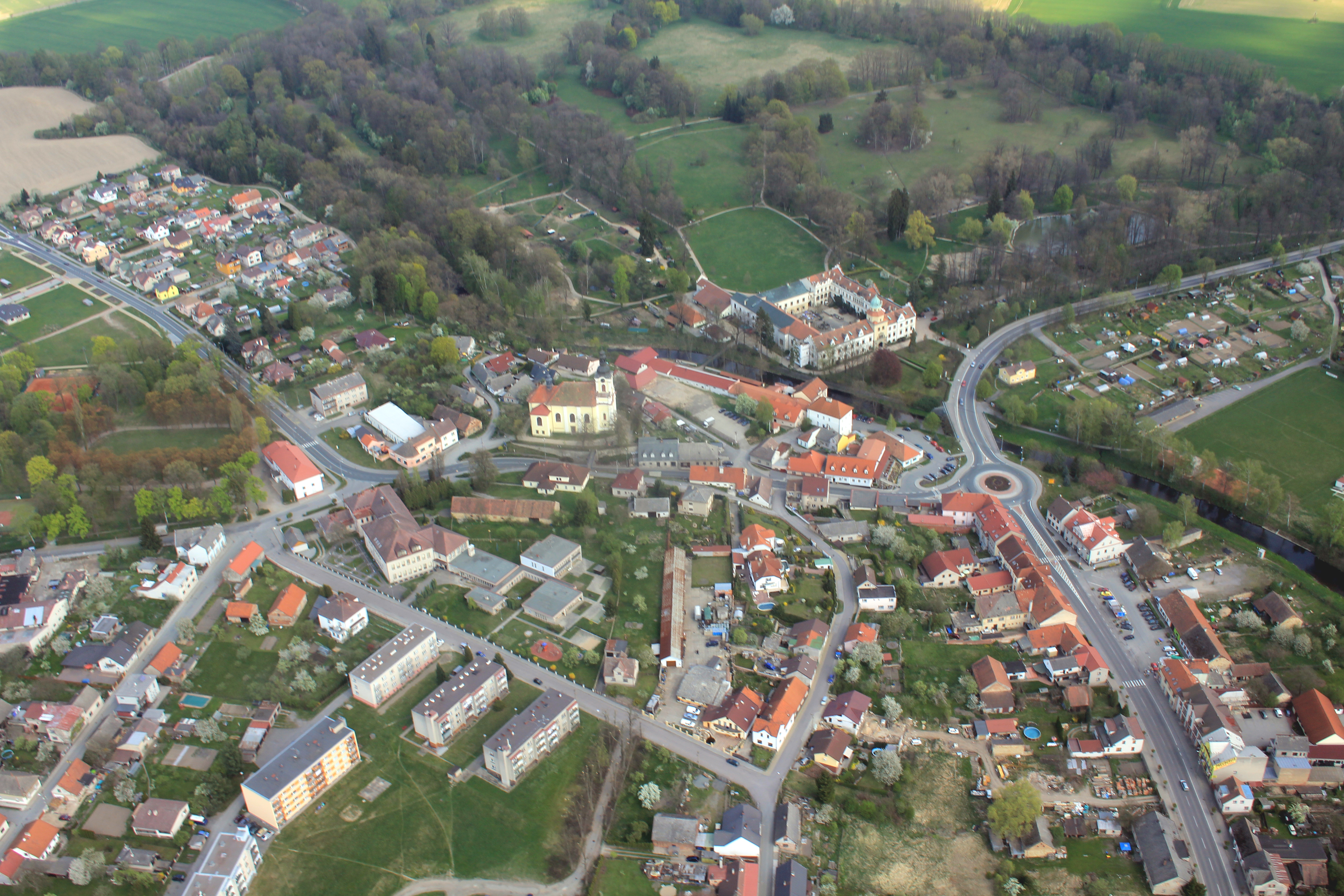
- Aerial view

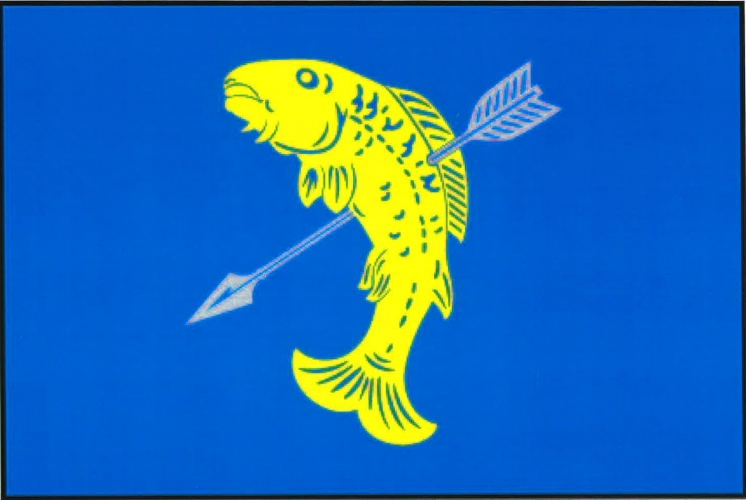
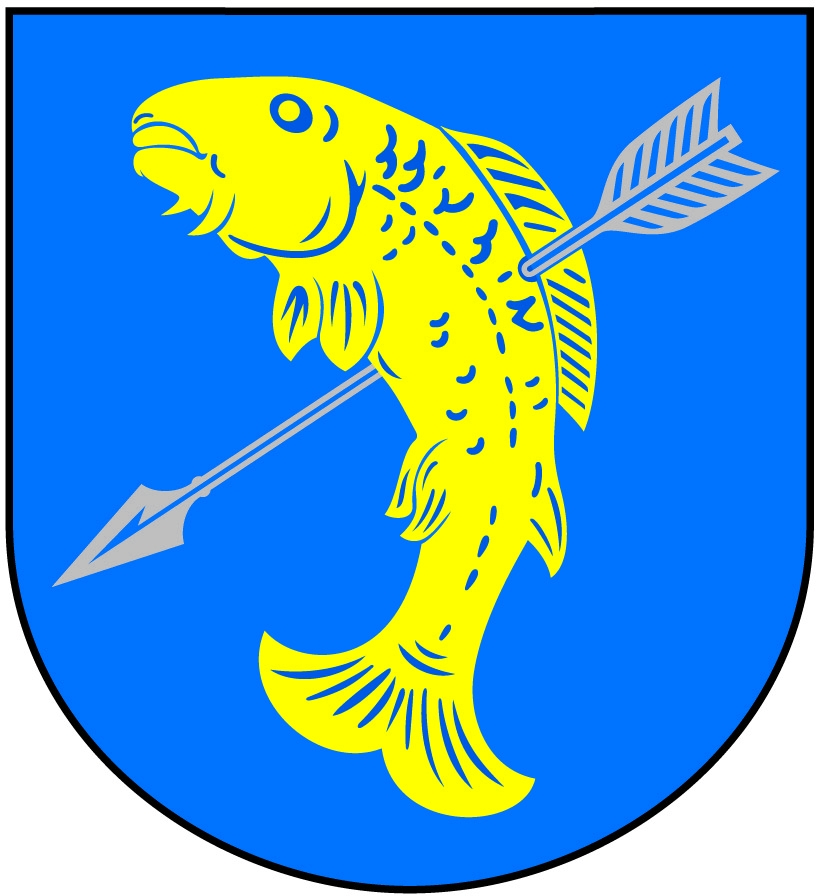
- Flag Coat of arms

- Location in the Czech Republic
- Coordinates: 50°7′58″N 16°10′44″E
- Country: Czech Republic
- Region: Hradec Králové
- District: Rychnov nad Kněžnou
- First mentioned: 1342

Area
  - Total: 5.62 km^{2} (2.17 sq mi)
- Elevation: 268 m (879 ft)

Population (2026-01-01)
  - Total: 1,671
  - Density: 297/km^{2} (770/sq mi)
- Time zone: UTC+1 (CET)
  - Summer (DST): UTC+2 (CEST)
- Postal code: 517 50
- Website: www.ou-castolovice.cz

Častolovice (Czech pronunciation: [ˈtʃastolovɪtsɛ]; German: Tschastolowitz) is a market town in Rychnov nad Kněžnou District in the Hradec Králové Region of the Czech Republic. It has about 1,700 inhabitants.

== Etymology ==
The name is derived from the personal name Častolov, meaning "the village of Častolov's people".

== Geography ==
Častolovice is located about 25 kilometres (16 mi) southeast of Hradec Králové. It lies in the Orlice Table. The highest point is at 320 m (1,050 ft) above sea level. The market town is situated on the Bělá River, near its confluence with the Divoká Orlice. The Divoká Orlice forms the southern municipal border.

== History ==
Around 1280, a Gothic fortress was built here by a noble family, later named Lords of Častolovice. The first written mention of Častolovice is from 1342, when the village was promoted to a market town by King John of Bohemia. Between 1588 and 1615, the fortress was rebuilt into a Renaissance castle. From 1694 until World War II, Častolovice was owned by the Sternberg family. In 1992, the castle was returned to this family.

== Demographics ==
Historical population

Year	Pop.	±%
1869	1,049	—
1880	1,156	+10.2%
1890	1,240	+7.3%
1900	1,324	+6.8%
1910	1,511	+14.1%

Year	Pop.	±%
1921	1,393	−7.8%
1930	1,464	+5.1%
1950	1,275	−12.9%
1961	1,373	+7.7%
1970	1,315	−4.2%

Year	Pop.	±%
1980	1,415	+7.6%
1991	1,438	+1.6%
2001	1,618	+12.5%
2011	1,655	+2.3%
2021	1,671	+1.0%

Source: Censuses

== Transport ==
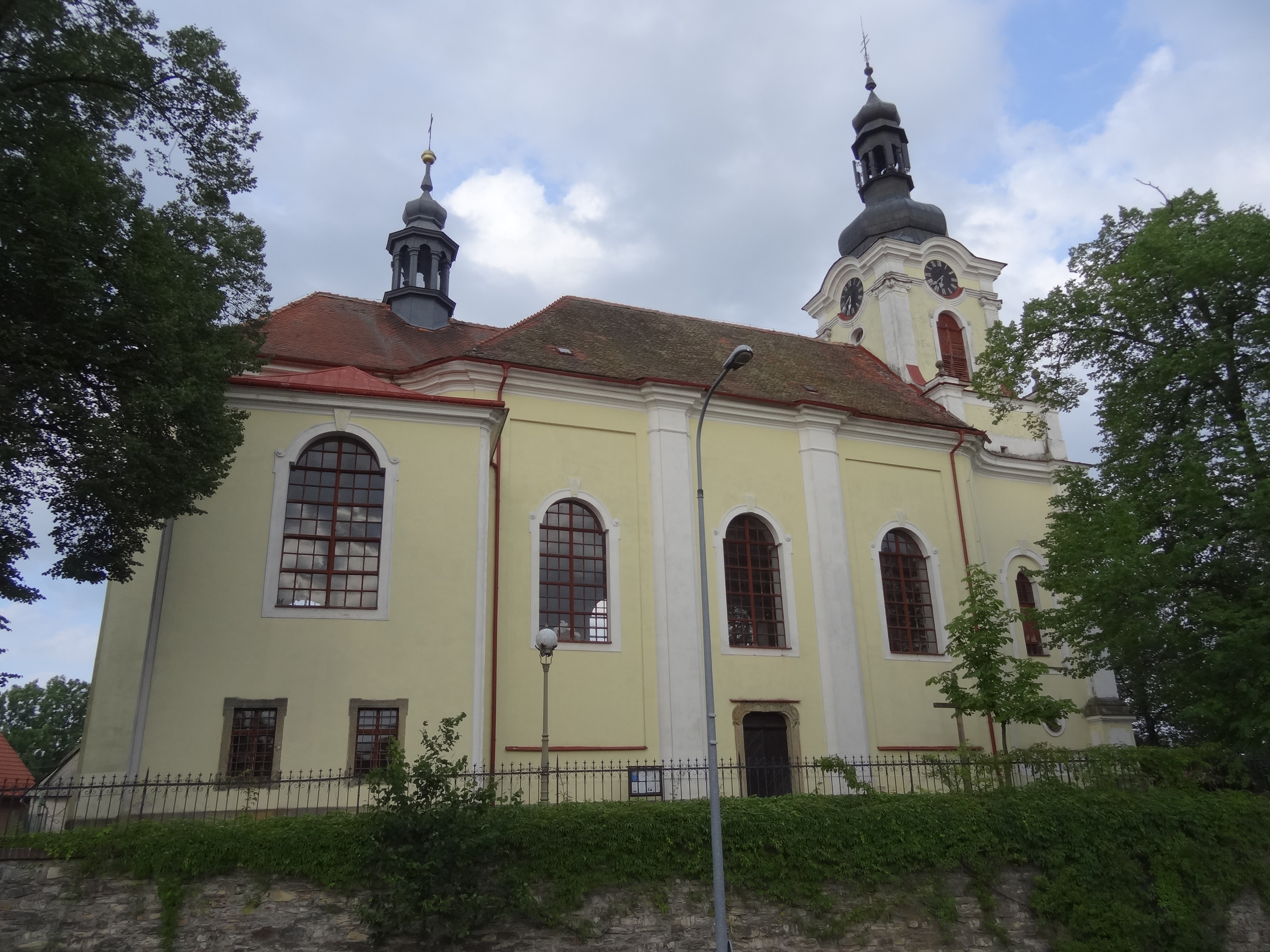
Church of Saint Vitus

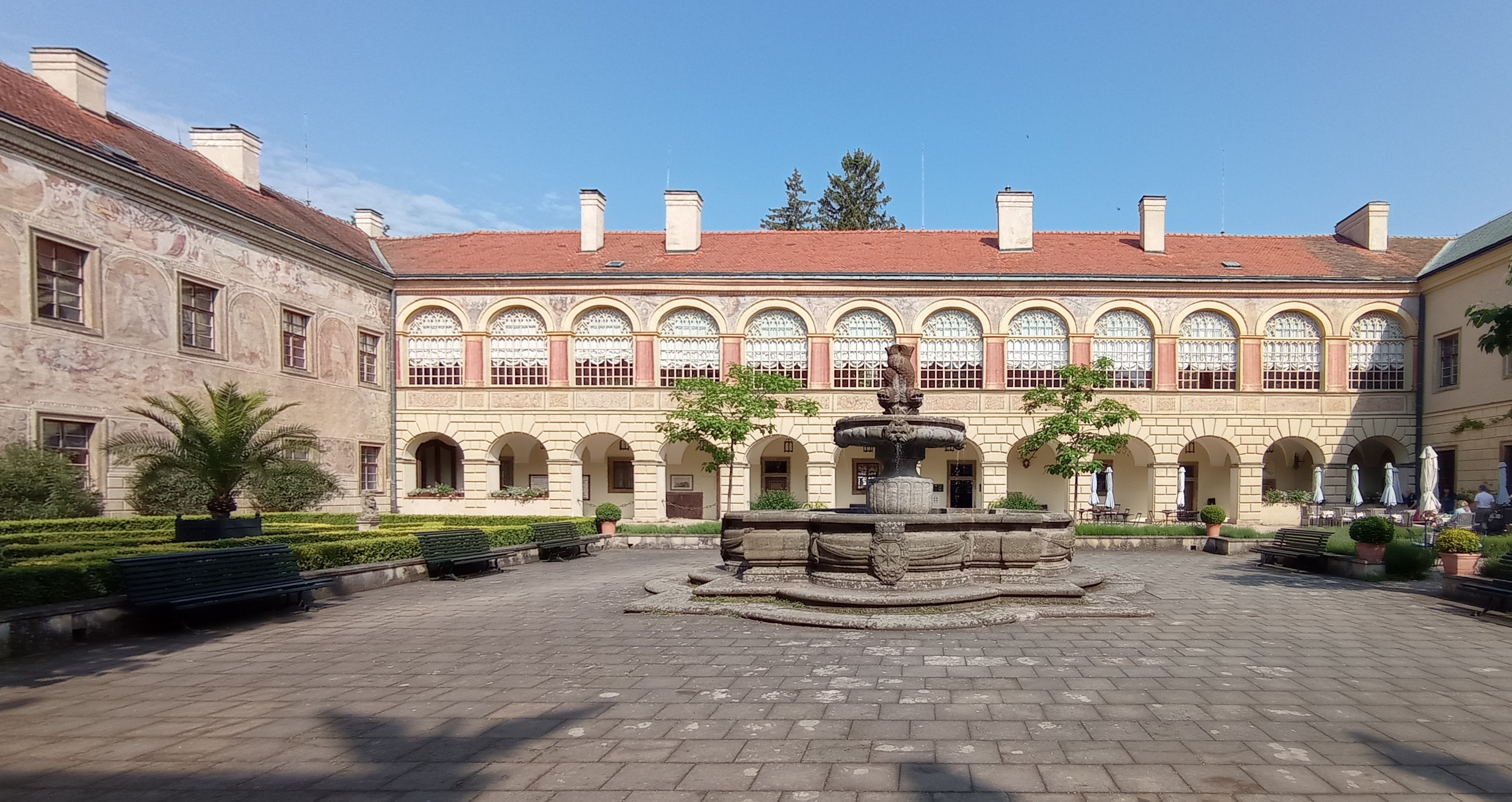
Častolovice Castle

Častolovice is located on the railway lines Hradec Králové–Letohrad and Rychnov nad Kněžnou–Choceň.

== Sights ==
The main sight of Častolovice is the Častolovice Castle. The castle is open to the public and includes a mini-zoo and an English park with a game park.

The Church of Saint Vitus is a Baroque building. It replaced an old Gothic church, first mentioned in 1356. Some elements of the original church are preserved in the present building.

== Notable people ==
- Jiří Pelikán (1906–1984), chess player
