= Paseky (Písek District) =

- Municipality
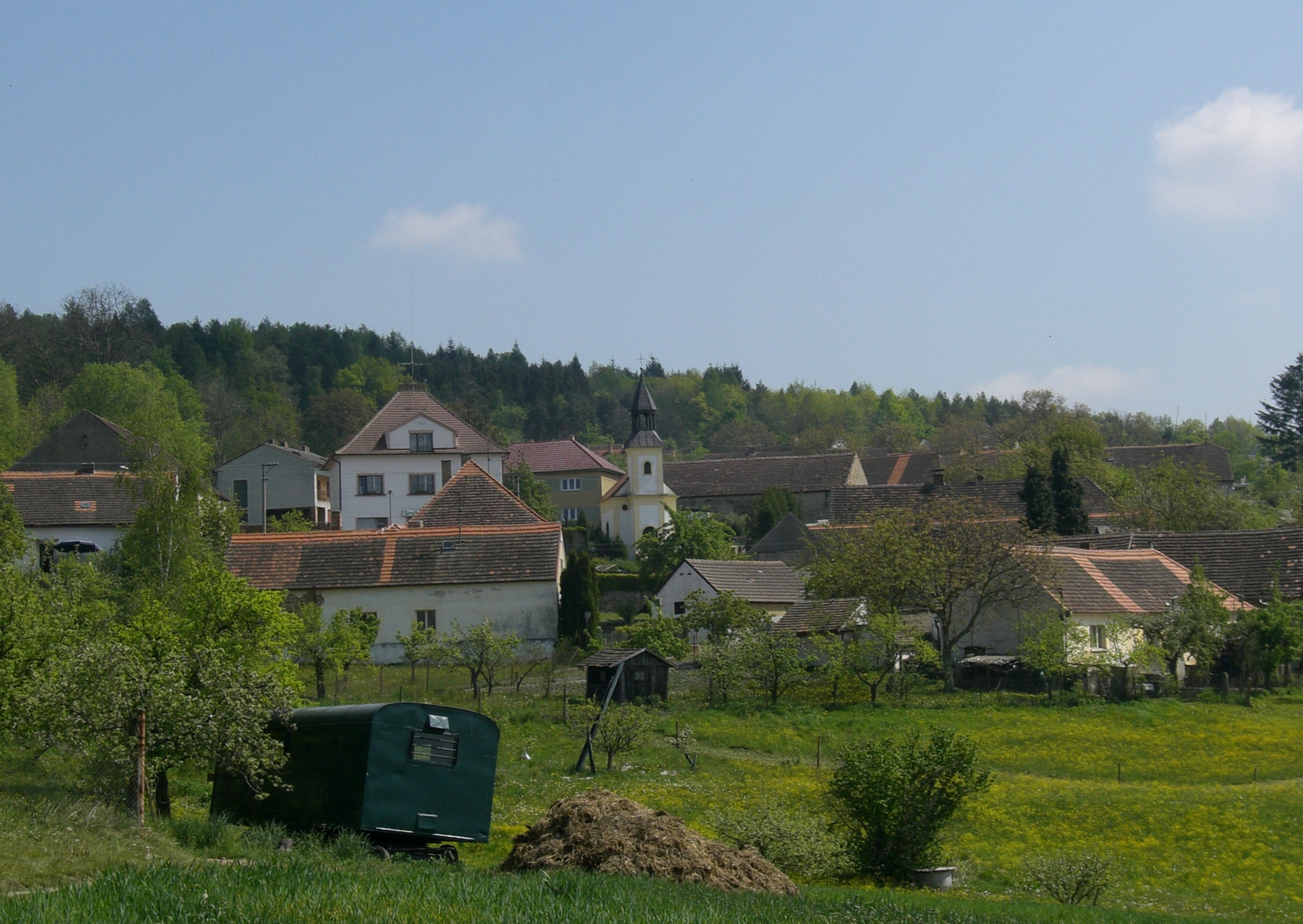
- View from the west

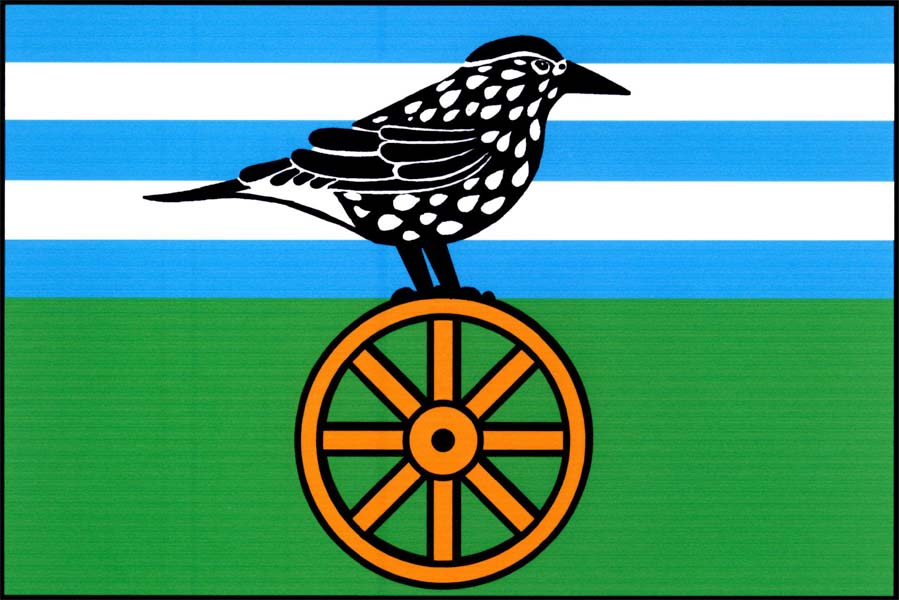
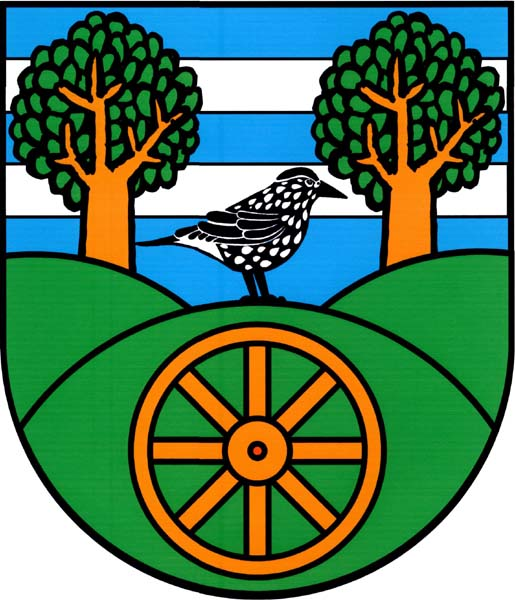
- Flag Coat of arms

- Location in the Czech Republic
- Coordinates: 49°15′6″N 14°15′17″E
- Country: Czech Republic
- Region: South Bohemian
- District: Písek
- First mentioned: 1748

Area
  - Total: 25.18 km^{2} (9.72 sq mi)
- Elevation: 465 m (1,526 ft)

Population (2026-01-01)
  - Total: 190
  - Density: 7.5/km^{2} (20/sq mi)
- Time zone: UTC+1 (CET)
  - Summer (DST): UTC+2 (CEST)
- Postal code: 398 11
- Website: www.obecpaseky.cz

Paseky is a municipality and village in Písek District in the South Bohemian Region of the Czech Republic. It has about 200 inhabitants.

Paseky lies approximately 11 kilometres (7 mi) south-east of Písek, 35 km (22 mi) north-west of České Budějovice, and 94 km (58 mi) south of Prague.

== Administrative division ==
Paseky consists of two municipal parts (in brackets population according to the 2021 census):

- Paseky (149)
- Nuzov (21)

== Demographics ==
Historical population
Year	Pop.	±%
1869	675	—
1880	727	+7.7%
1890	672	−7.6%
1900	628	−6.5%
1910	602	−4.1%
1921	615	+2.2%
1930	490	−20.3%
1950	371	−24.3%
1961	320	−13.7%
1970	295	−7.8%
1980	222	−24.7%
1991	153	−31.1%
2001	139	−9.2%
2011	148	+6.5%
2021	170	+14.9%
Source: Censuses
