= Kvasiny =

- Municipality
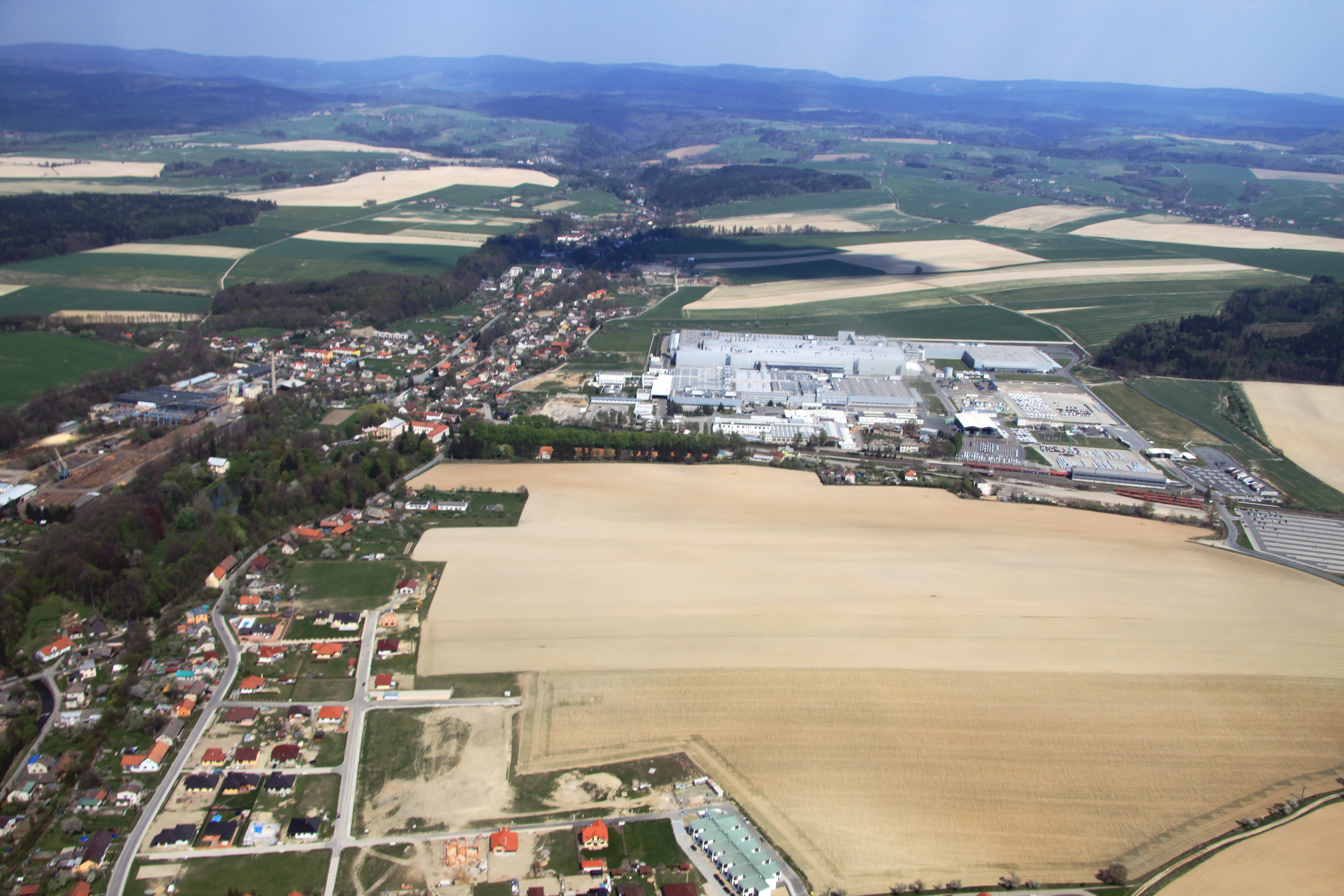
- Aerial view of Kvasiny

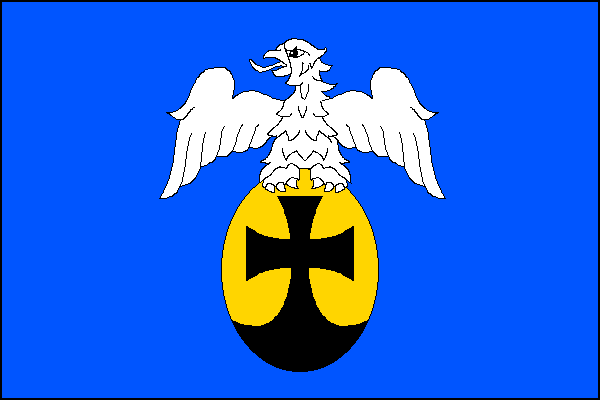
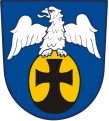
- Flag Coat of arms

- Location in the Czech Republic
- Coordinates: 50°12′45″N 16°15′48″E
- Country: Czech Republic
- Region: Hradec Králové
- District: Rychnov nad Kněžnou
- First mentioned: 1544

Area
  - Total: 6.66 km^{2} (2.57 sq mi)
- Elevation: 343 m (1,125 ft)

Population (2026-01-01)
  - Total: 1,724
  - Density: 259/km^{2} (670/sq mi)
- Time zone: UTC+1 (CET)
  - Summer (DST): UTC+2 (CEST)
- Postal code: 517 02
- Website: www.obec-kvasiny.cz

Kvasiny (German: Kwasney) is a municipality and village in Rychnov nad Kněžnou District in the Hradec Králové Region of the Czech Republic. It has about 1,700 inhabitants.

== History ==
The first written mention of Kvasiny is from 1544. The village belonged to the Skuhrov estate.

== Demographics ==
Historical population
Year	Pop.	±%
1869	967	—
1880	992	+2.6%
1890	1,078	+8.7%
1900	1,167	+8.3%
1910	1,222	+4.7%
1921	1,049	−14.2%
1930	913	−13.0%
1950	979	+7.2%
1961	1,077	+10.0%
1970	1,147	+6.5%
1980	1,130	−1.5%
1991	1,147	+1.5%
2001	1,311	+14.3%
2011	1,463	+11.6%
2021	1,653	+13.0%
Source: Censuses

== Economy ==
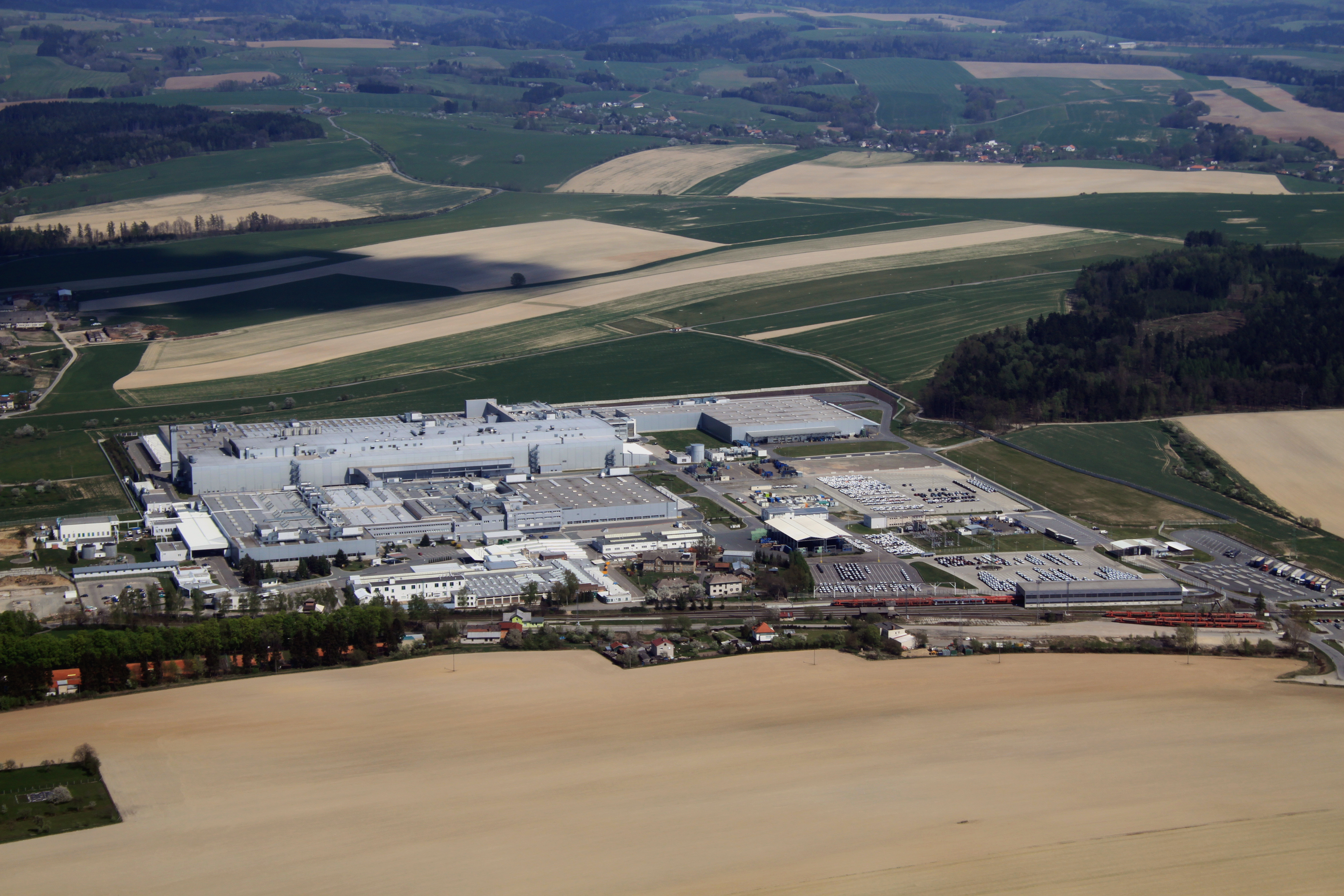
Škoda Auto factory in Kvasiny

Kvasiny is home to the Volkswagen Group-owned Škoda Auto factory. It has been in operation since 1934.
