= Synkov-Slemeno =

- Municipality
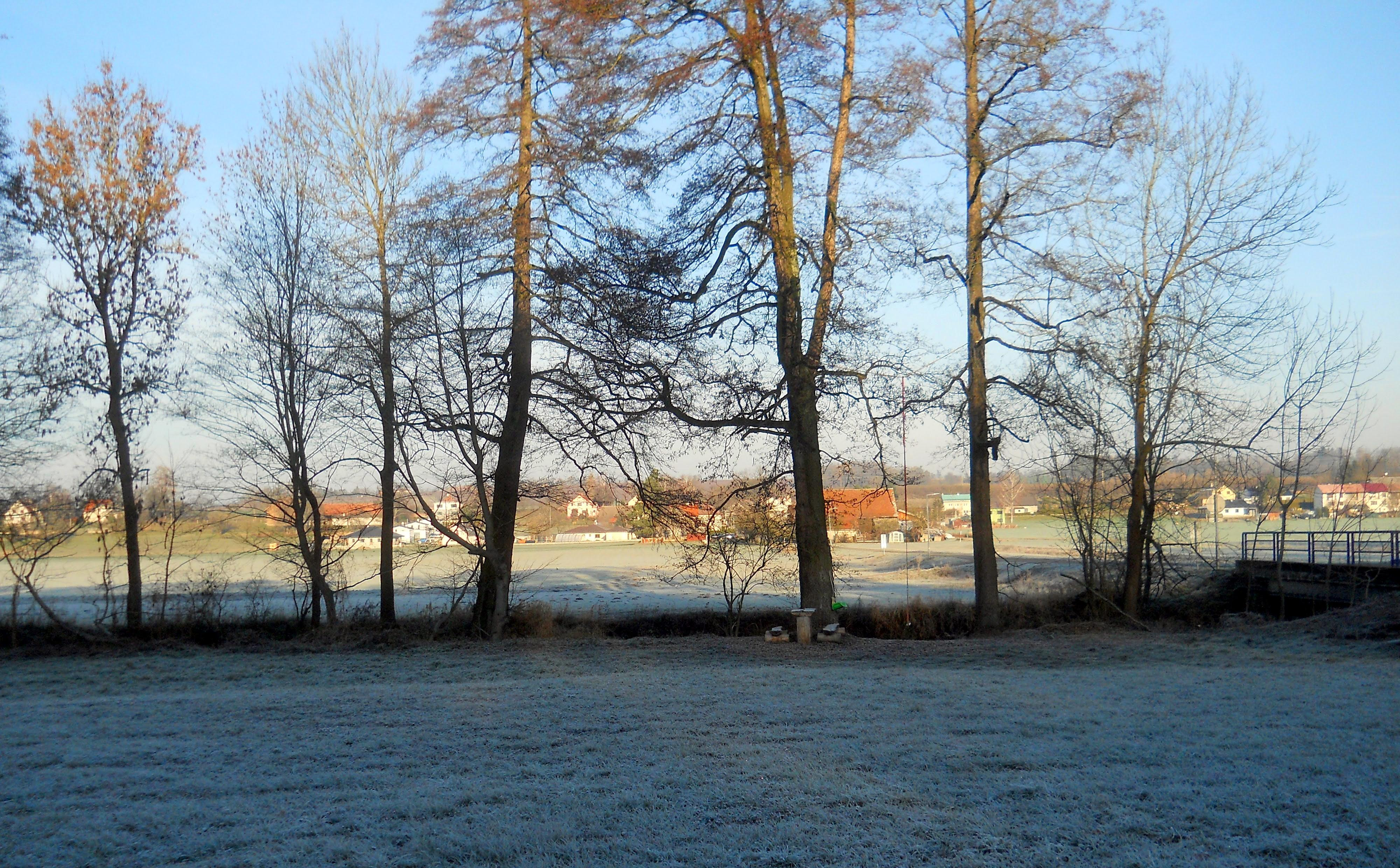
- View of Synkov

- Flag Coat of arms

- Location in the Czech Republic
- Coordinates: 50°8′40″N 16°12′53″E
- Country: Czech Republic
- Region: Hradec Králové
- District: Rychnov nad Kněžnou
- First mentioned: 1352

Area
  - Total: 7.24 km^{2} (2.80 sq mi)
- Elevation: 284 m (932 ft)

Population (2026-01-01)
  - Total: 459
  - Density: 63.4/km^{2} (164/sq mi)
- Time zone: UTC+1 (CET)
  - Summer (DST): UTC+2 (CEST)
- Postal code: 516 01
- Website: synkov-slemeno.cz

Synkov-Slemeno is a municipality in Rychnov nad Kněžnou District in the Hradec Králové Region of the Czech Republic. It has about 500 inhabitants.

== Administrative division ==
Synkov-Slemeno consists of three municipal parts (in brackets population according to the 2021 census):

- Synkov (216)
- Slemeno (155)
- Jedlina (49)

== Demographics ==
Historical population
Year	Pop.	±%
1869	657	—
1880	630	−4.1%
1890	655	+4.0%
1900	601	−8.2%
1910	616	+2.5%
1921	575	−6.7%
1930	558	−3.0%
1950	399	−28.5%
1961	373	−6.5%
1970	357	−4.3%
1980	336	−5.9%
1991	344	+2.4%
2001	376	+9.3%
2011	384	+2.1%
2021	420	+9.4%
Source: Censuses
