= Libel (Rychnov nad Kněžnou District) =

- Municipality
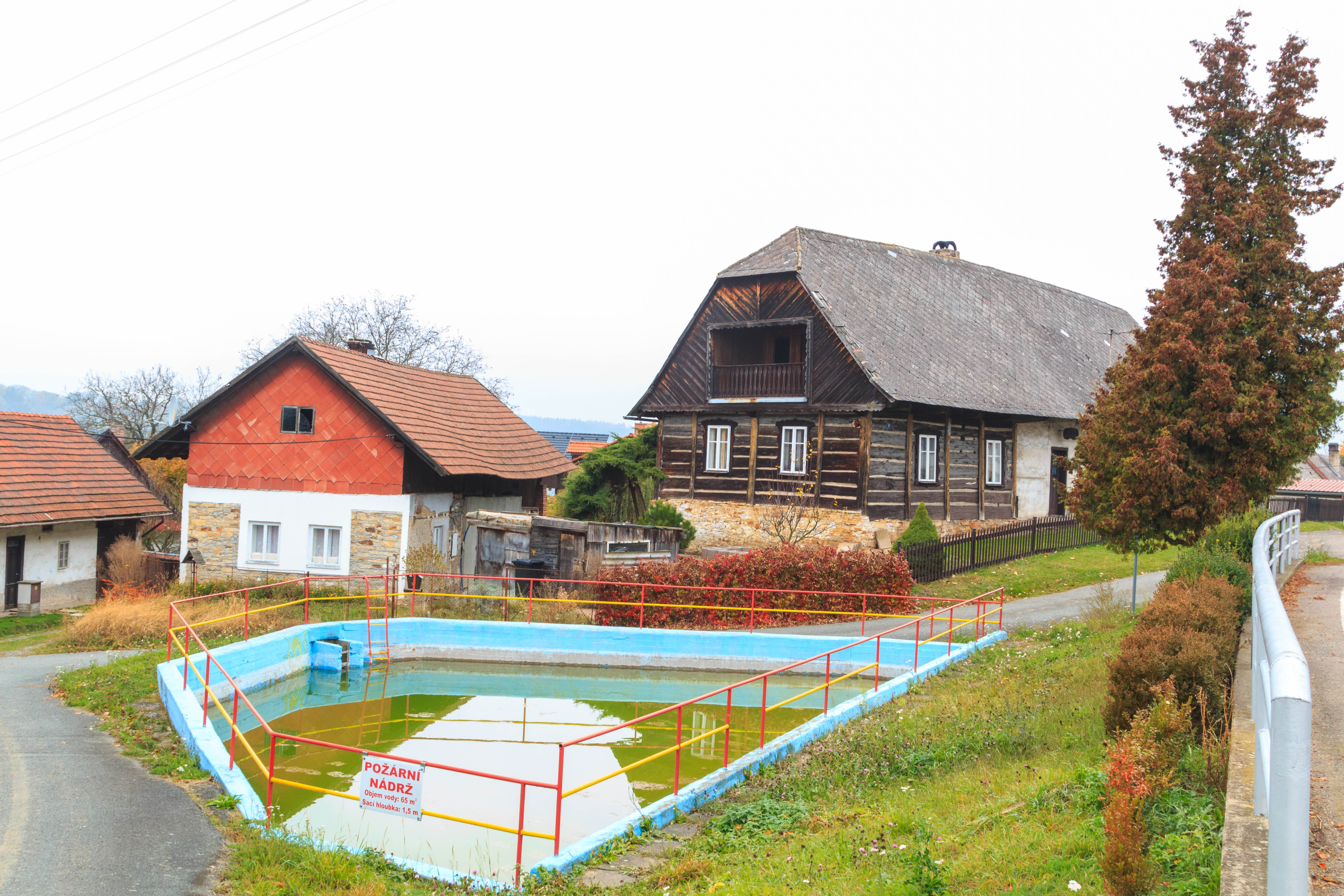
- Water tank in the centre of Libel

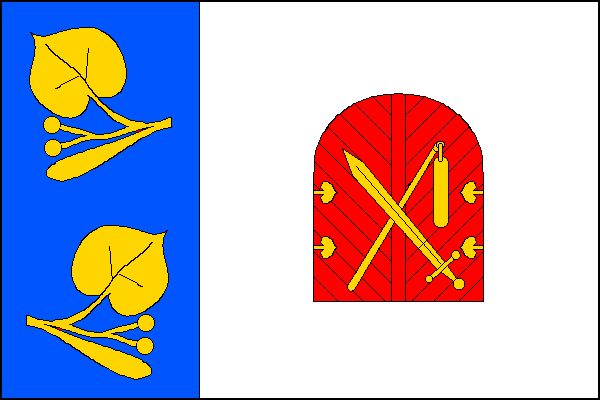
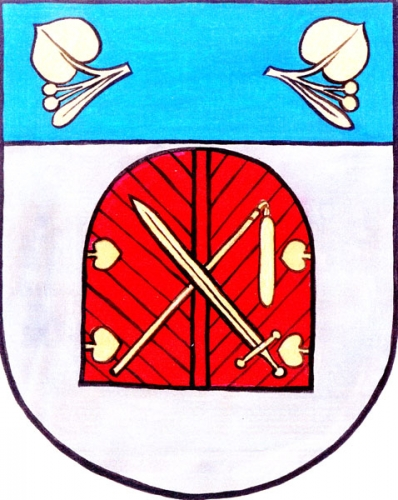
- Flag Coat of arms

- Location in the Czech Republic
- Coordinates: 50°9′18″N 16°12′9″E
- Country: Czech Republic
- Region: Hradec Králové
- District: Rychnov nad Kněžnou
- First mentioned: 1414

Area
  - Total: 3.62 km^{2} (1.40 sq mi)
- Elevation: 325 m (1,066 ft)

Population (2026-01-01)
  - Total: 188
  - Density: 51.9/km^{2} (135/sq mi)
- Time zone: UTC+1 (CET)
  - Summer (DST): UTC+2 (CEST)
- Postal code: 517 41
- Website: www.oulibel.cz

Libel is a municipality and village in Rychnov nad Kněžnou District in the Hradec Králové Region of the Czech Republic. It has about 200 inhabitants.

== Demographics ==
Historical population
Year	Pop.	±%
1869	263	—
1880	275	+4.6%
1890	274	−0.4%
1900	284	+3.6%
1910	287	+1.1%
1921	294	+2.4%
1930	252	−14.3%
1950	198	−21.4%
1961	155	−21.7%
1970	135	−12.9%
1980	115	−14.8%
1991	103	−10.4%
2001	107	+3.9%
2011	119	+11.2%
2021	159	+33.6%
Source: Censuses
