= Skuhrov nad Bělou =

- Municipality
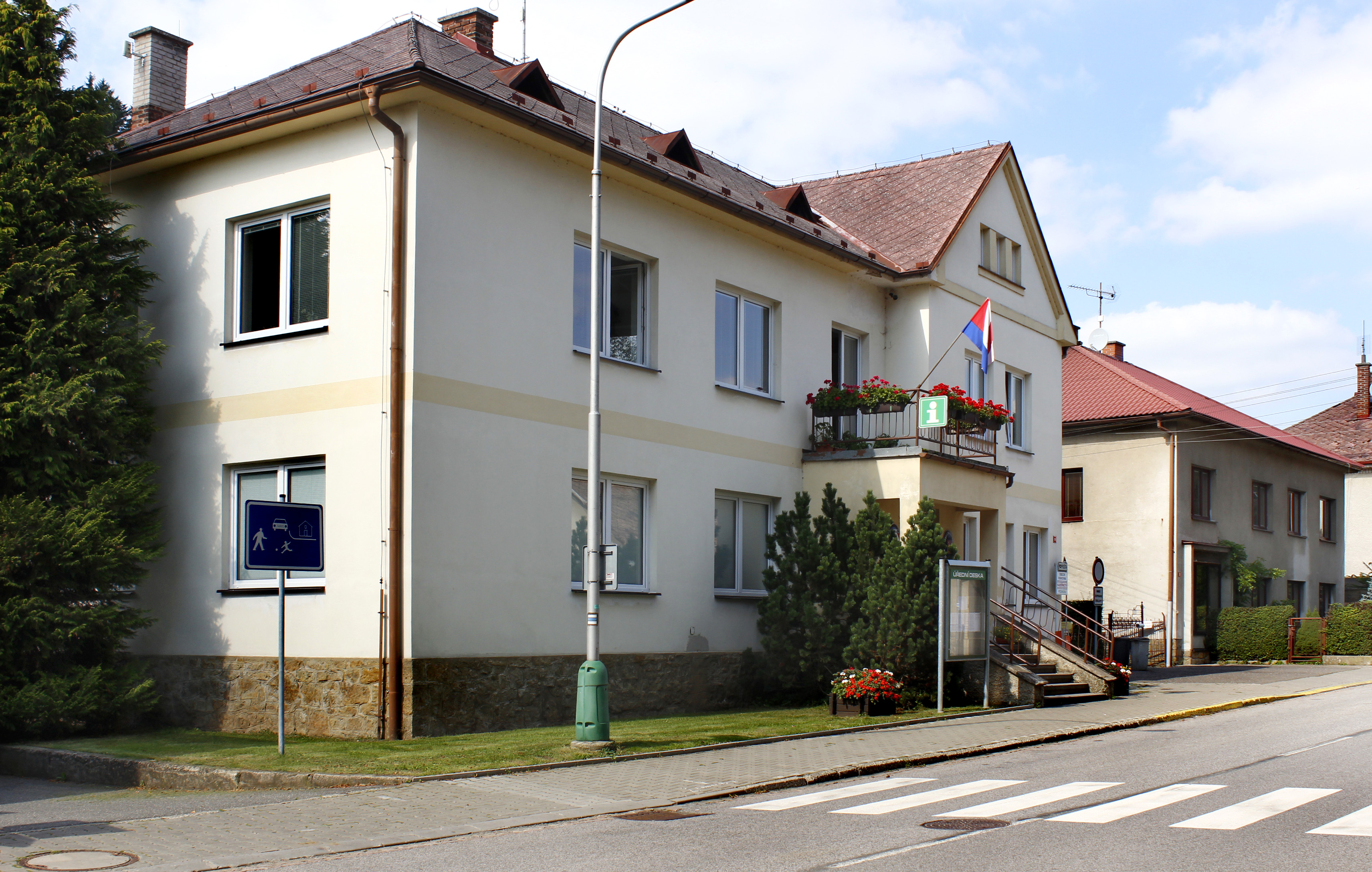
- Municipal office

- Flag Coat of arms

- Location in the Czech Republic
- Coordinates: 50°13′46″N 16°17′33″E
- Country: Czech Republic
- Region: Hradec Králové
- District: Rychnov nad Kněžnou
- First mentioned: 1279

Area
  - Total: 16.63 km^{2} (6.42 sq mi)
- Elevation: 379 m (1,243 ft)

Population (2026-01-01)
  - Total: 1,113
  - Density: 66.93/km^{2} (173.3/sq mi)
- Time zone: UTC+1 (CET)
  - Summer (DST): UTC+2 (CEST)
- Postal code: 517 03
- Website: www.skuhrov.cz

Skuhrov nad Bělou is a municipality and village in Rychnov nad Kněžnou District in the Hradec Králové Region of the Czech Republic. it has about 1,100 inhabitants.

== Administrative division ==
Skuhrov nad Bělou consists of seven municipal parts (in brackets population according to the 2021 census):

- Skuhrov nad Bělou (552)
- Brocná (202)
- Debřece (79)
- Hraštice (86)
- Nová Ves (29)
- Rybníčky (28)
- Svinná (105)

== History ==
The first written mention of Skuhrov nad Bělou is from 1279. In 1310, it became a market town, but after the Thirty Years' War, it was depopulated and lost its importance.

== Demographics ==
Historical population
Year	Pop.	±%
1869	1,639	—
1880	1,705	+4.0%
1890	1,715	+0.6%
1900	1,724	+0.5%
1910	1,692	−1.9%
1921	1,579	−6.7%
1930	1,489	−5.7%
1950	1,321	−11.3%
1961	1,299	−1.7%
1970	1,219	−6.2%
1980	1,174	−3.7%
1991	1,069	−8.9%
2001	1,034	−3.3%
2011	1,051	+1.6%
2021	1,081	+2.9%
Source: Censuses
