= Hřibiny-Ledská =

- Municipality
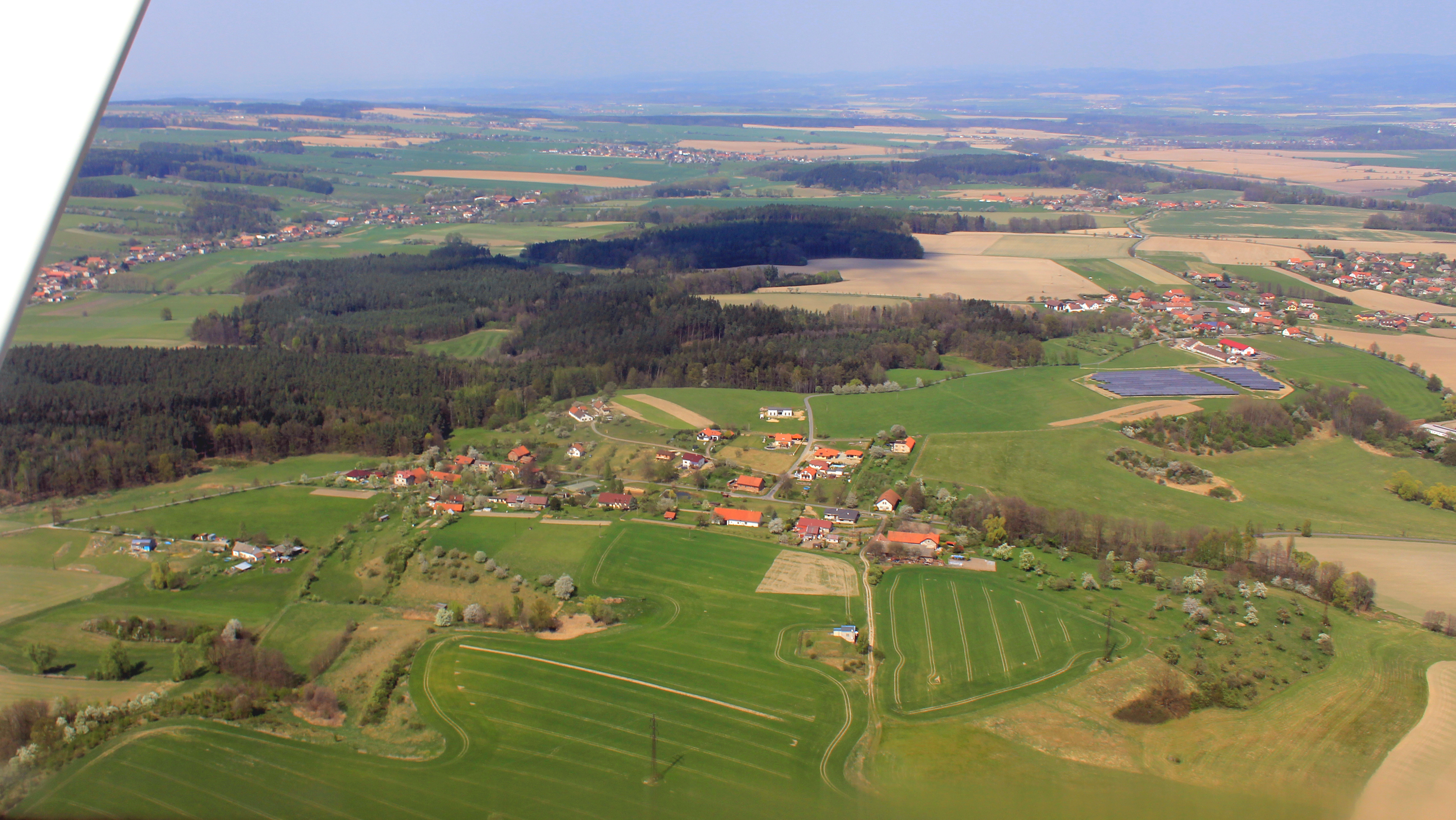
- Aerial view

- Flag Coat of arms

- Location in the Czech Republic
- Coordinates: 50°8′53″N 16°10′26″E
- Country: Czech Republic
- Region: Hradec Králové
- District: Rychnov nad Kněžnou
- First mentioned: 1544

Area
  - Total: 5.13 km^{2} (1.98 sq mi)
- Elevation: 317 m (1,040 ft)

Population (2026-01-01)
  - Total: 404
  - Density: 78.8/km^{2} (204/sq mi)
- Time zone: UTC+1 (CET)
  - Summer (DST): UTC+2 (CEST)
- Postal code: 517 41
- Website: www.hribiny-ledska.cz

Hřibiny-Ledská is a municipality in Rychnov nad Kněžnou District in the Hradec Králové Region of the Czech Republic. It has about 400 inhabitants.

== Administrative division ==
Hřibiny-Ledská consists of three municipal parts (in brackets population according to the 2021 census):

- Hřibiny (84)
- Ledská (200)
- Paseky (74)

Ledská consists of the urbanistically separated parts of Velká Ledská and Malá Ledská.

== Geography ==
Hřibiny-Ledská is located about 24 kilometres (15 mi) east of Hradec Králové. It lies in the Orlice Table. The highest point is at 342 m (1,122 ft) above sea level. The Bělá River flows along the eastern municipal border.

== History ==
The first written mention of Paseky is from 1387. Ledská was first mentioned in 1442 and Hřibiny in 1544. Until 1960, Hřibiny and Ledská were two separate municipalities, and Paseky was a part of Hřibiny. In 1960, these municipalities were merged.

== Demographics ==
Historical population

Year	Pop.	±%
1869	614	—
1880	636	+3.6%
1890	609	−4.2%
1900	645	+5.9%
1910	601	−6.8%

Year	Pop.	±%
1921	581	−3.3%
1930	568	−2.2%
1950	471	−17.1%
1961	476	+1.1%
1970	403	−15.3%

Year	Pop.	±%
1980	339	−15.9%
1991	286	−15.6%
2001	291	+1.7%
2011	350	+20.3%
2021	358	+2.3%

Source: Censuses

== Transport ==
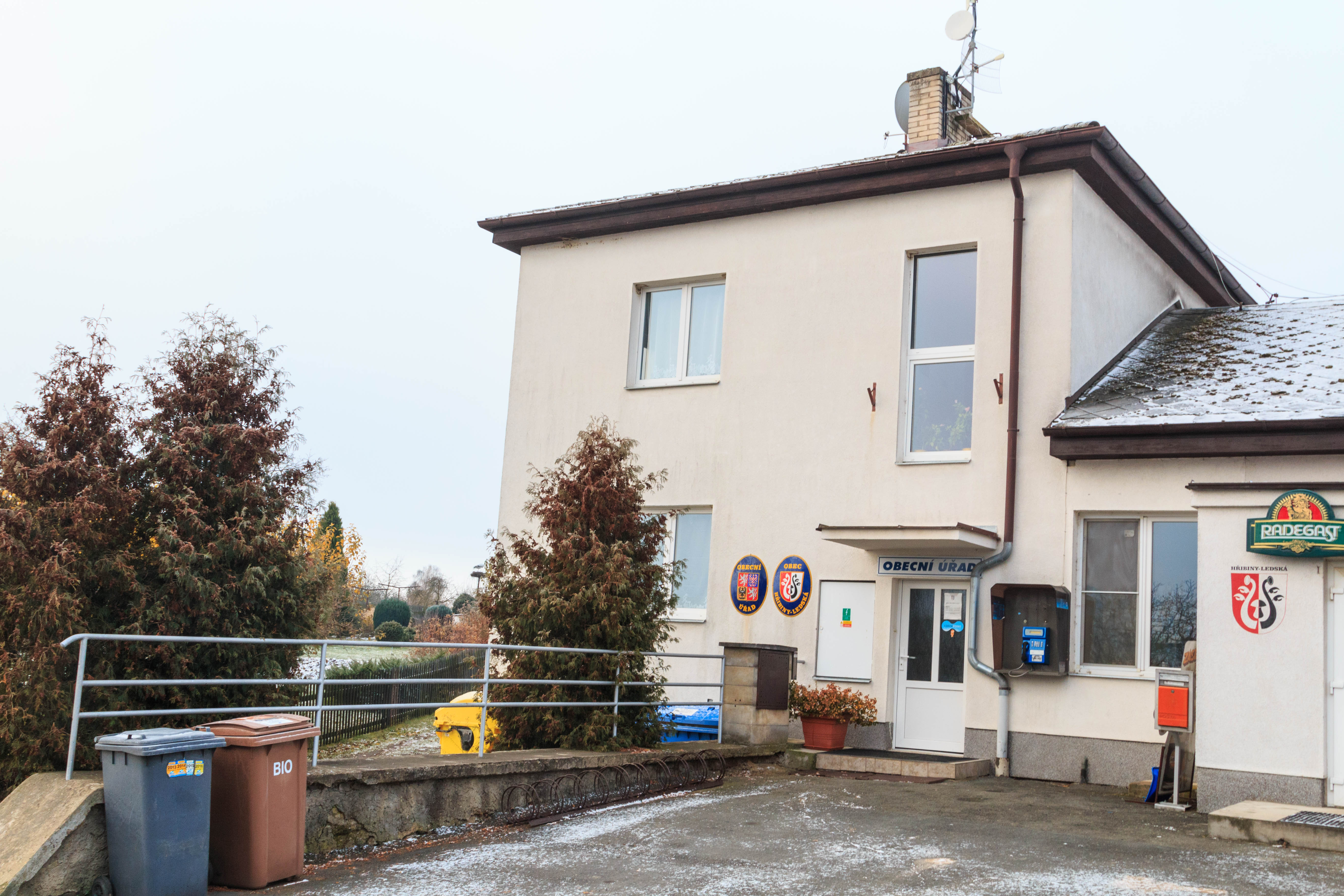
Municipal office in Hřibiny

There are no railways or major roads passing through the municipality.

== Sights ==
The only protected cultural monument in the municipality is a former watermill, now serving recreational purposes. It was built at the beginning of the 17th century and rebuilt in the 1920s.
