= List of cities and towns in the Czech Republic =

This is a list of municipalities (obce) of the Czech Republic which have status of a city, town or market town granted by law. As of 2026, there are 27 cities, 583 towns and 234 market towns in the Czech Republic.

== Cities ==
Name	Population (2026)	Region
Prague	1,407,084	Prague
Brno	404,296	South Moravian
Ostrava	280,853	Moravian-Silesian
Plzeň	187,863	Plzeň
Liberec	108,214	Liberec
Olomouc	105,297	Olomouc
České Budějovice	97,128	South Bohemian
Hradec Králové	93,354	Hradec Králové
Pardubice	92,713	Pardubice
Ústí nad Labem	90,035	Ústí nad Labem
Zlín	74,917	Zlín
Kladno	69,728	Central Bohemian
Havířov	67,998	Moravian-Silesian
Most	63,160	Ústí nad Labem
Opava	54,881	Moravian-Silesian
Jihlava	53,686	Vysočina
Frýdek-Místek	53,164	Moravian-Silesian
Teplice	50,856	Ústí nad Labem
Karlovy Vary	48,788	Karlovy Vary
Karviná	48,684	Moravian-Silesian
Mladá Boleslav	47,874	Central Bohemian
Chomutov	46,560	Ústí nad Labem
Jablonec nad Nisou	46,206	Liberec
Děčín	46,003	Ústí nad Labem
Prostějov	43,236	Olomouc
Přerov	40,492	Olomouc
Třinec	33,523	Moravian-Silesian

== Towns ==
Name	Population (2026)	Region
Česká Lípa	36,364	Liberec
Třebíč	34,476	Vysočina
Tábor	34,339	South Bohemian
Znojmo	33,989	South Moravian
Kolín	33,392	Central Bohemian
Příbram	32,917	Central Bohemian
Cheb	32,892	Karlovy Vary
Písek	31,002	South Bohemian
Trutnov	29,337	Hradec Králové
Kroměříž	27,781	Zlín
Orlová	27,383	Moravian-Silesian
Vsetín	24,974	Zlín
Uherské Hradiště	24,852	Zlín
Břeclav	24,583	South Moravian
Šumperk	24,444	Olomouc
Chrudim	23,562	Pardubice
Havlíčkův Brod	23,368	Vysočina
Hodonín	23,344	South Moravian
Klatovy	22,921	Plzeň
Český Těšín	22,870	Moravian-Silesian
Nový Jičín	22,740	Moravian-Silesian
Litoměřice	22,627	Ústí nad Labem
Valašské Meziříčí	22,568	Zlín
Krnov	22,303	Moravian-Silesian
Strakonice	22,275	South Bohemian
Litvínov	22,258	Ústí nad Labem
Sokolov	21,908	Karlovy Vary
Kutná Hora	21,787	Central Bohemian
Beroun	21,744	Central Bohemian
Kopřivnice	21,245	Moravian-Silesian
Brandýs nad Labem-Stará Boleslav	20,926	Central Bohemian
Vyškov	20,664	South Moravian
Jindřichův Hradec	20,369	South Bohemian
Mělník	20,301	Central Bohemian
Žďár nad Sázavou	20,247	Vysočina
Bohumín	20,234	Moravian-Silesian
Blansko	19,900	South Moravian
Náchod	19,649	Hradec Králové
Kralupy nad Vltavou	19,138	Central Bohemian
Jirkov	19,067	Ústí nad Labem
Žatec	18,984	Ústí nad Labem
Kadaň	18,088	Ústí nad Labem
Louny	18,061	Ústí nad Labem
Hranice	17,910	Olomouc
Říčany	17,314	Central Bohemian
Slaný	17,247	Central Bohemian
Otrokovice	17,239	Zlín
Benešov	17,025	Central Bohemian
Uherský Brod	16,280	Zlín
Neratovice	16,279	Central Bohemian
Pelhřimov	16,233	Vysočina
Jičín	16,052	Hradec Králové
Svitavy	16,041	Pardubice
Rožnov pod Radhoštěm	15,916	Zlín
Nymburk	15,795	Central Bohemian
Rakovník	15,745	Central Bohemian
Ostrov	15,615	Karlovy Vary
Dvůr Králové nad Labem	15,316	Hradec Králové
Poděbrady	15,238	Central Bohemian
Česká Třebová	14,982	Pardubice
Bruntál	14,791	Moravian-Silesian
Varnsdorf	14,645	Ústí nad Labem
Milovice	14,609	Central Bohemian
Turnov	14,607	Liberec
Bílina	14,401	Ústí nad Labem
Tachov	14,308	Plzeň
Rokycany	14,248	Plzeň
Ústí nad Orlicí	13,988	Pardubice
Klášterec nad Ohří	13,980	Ústí nad Labem
Mariánské Lázně	13,921	Karlovy Vary
Hlučín	13,245	Moravian-Silesian
Šternberk	13,207	Olomouc
Zábřeh	13,157	Olomouc
Vysoké Mýto	12,849	Pardubice
Krupka	12,731	Ústí nad Labem
Aš	12,683	Karlovy Vary
Český Krumlov	12,658	South Bohemian
Roudnice nad Labem	12,561	Ústí nad Labem
Čelákovice	12,507	Central Bohemian
Jaroměř	12,487	Hradec Králové
Boskovice	12,457	South Moravian
Chodov	12,451	Karlovy Vary
Vrchlabí	12,028	Hradec Králové
Velké Meziříčí	11,709	Vysočina
Rychnov nad Kněžnou	11,693	Hradec Králové
Holešov	11,544	Zlín
Kuřim	11,499	South Moravian
Humpolec	11,487	Vysočina
Vlašim	11,329	Central Bohemian
Nový Bor	11,257	Liberec
Uničov	11,060	Olomouc
Prachatice	11,036	South Bohemian
Domažlice	10,973	Plzeň
Rumburk	10,780	Ústí nad Labem
Sušice	10,689	Plzeň
Králův Dvůr	10,677	Central Bohemian
Jesenice	10,625	Central Bohemian
Veselí nad Moravou	10,574	South Moravian
Kyjov	10,537	South Moravian
Frenštát pod Radhoštěm	10,495	Moravian-Silesian
Litomyšl	10,411	Pardubice
Čáslav	10,387	Central Bohemian
Jeseník	10,324	Olomouc
Přelouč	10,195	Pardubice
Lysá nad Labem	10,072	Central Bohemian
Ivančice	9,905	South Moravian
Mohelnice	9,886	Olomouc
Lanškroun	9,845	Pardubice
Frýdlant nad Ostravicí	9,839	Moravian-Silesian
Nové Město na Moravě	9,716	Vysočina
Hlinsko	9,504	Pardubice
Litovel	9,448	Olomouc
Moravská Třebová	9,418	Pardubice
Tišnov	9,270	South Moravian
Hostivice	9,266	Central Bohemian
Studénka	9,166	Moravian-Silesian
Nové Město nad Metují	9,165	Hradec Králové
Roztoky	9,147	Central Bohemian
Mnichovo Hradiště	9,123	Central Bohemian
Chotěboř	9,076	Vysočina
Polička	9,035	Pardubice
Dobříš	8,882	Central Bohemian
Nová Paka	8,834	Hradec Králové
Lovosice	8,744	Ústí nad Labem
Duchcov	8,718	Ústí nad Labem
Choceň	8,700	Pardubice
Štětí	8,536	Ústí nad Labem
Hořice	8,427	Hradec Králové
Příbor	8,311	Moravian-Silesian
Třeboň	8,249	South Bohemian
Hořovice	8,245	Central Bohemian
Stříbro	8,218	Plzeň
Červený Kostelec	8,202	Hradec Králové
Dubí	8,148	Ústí nad Labem
Hrádek nad Nisou	8,009	Liberec
Lipník nad Bečvou	8,000	Olomouc
Semily	7,999	Liberec
Benátky nad Jizerou	7,963	Central Bohemian
Milevsko	7,956	South Bohemian
Šlapanice	7,940	South Moravian
Bystřice pod Hostýnem	7,911	Zlín
Bystřice nad Pernštejnem	7,851	Vysočina
Rychvald	7,823	Moravian-Silesian
Černošice	7,781	Central Bohemian
Týn nad Vltavou	7,728	South Bohemian
Rýmařov	7,670	Moravian-Silesian
Nejdek	7,647	Karlovy Vary
Mikulov	7,552	South Moravian
Kaplice	7,547	South Bohemian
Úvaly	7,507	Central Bohemian
Vratimov	7,469	Moravian-Silesian
Vodňany	7,464	South Bohemian
Český Brod	7,355	Central Bohemian
Petřvald	7,350	Moravian-Silesian
Bílovec	7,349	Moravian-Silesian
Odry	7,336	Moravian-Silesian
Frýdlant	7,332	Liberec
Nový Bydžov	7,298	Hradec Králové
Slavkov u Brna	7,294	South Moravian
Vimperk	7,270	South Bohemian
Sezimovo Ústí	7,131	South Bohemian
Dačice	7,118	South Bohemian
Moravské Budějovice	7,079	Vysočina
Letovice	7,071	South Moravian
Broumov	6,998	Hradec Králové
Nýřany	6,994	Plzeň
Napajedla	6,981	Zlín
Soběslav	6,979	South Bohemian
Bučovice	6,859	South Moravian
Rosice	6,825	South Moravian
Sedlčany	6,784	Central Bohemian
Holice	6,783	Pardubice
Přeštice	6,757	Plzeň
Kravaře	6,691	Moravian-Silesian
Blatná	6,679	South Bohemian
Staré Město	6,660	Zlín
Šenov	6,642	Moravian-Silesian
Odolena Voda	6,639	Central Bohemian
Veselí nad Lužnicí	6,492	South Bohemian
Dobřany	6,483	Plzeň
Dobruška	6,445	Hradec Králové
Hustopeče	6,391	South Moravian
Mníšek pod Brdy	6,377	Central Bohemian
Hulín	6,377	Zlín
Kraslice	6,369	Karlovy Vary
Chrastava	6,349	Liberec
Letohrad	6,345	Pardubice
Mimoň	6,321	Liberec
Pohořelice	6,299	South Moravian
Světlá nad Sázavou	6,289	Vysočina
Podbořany	6,254	Ústí nad Labem
Kostelec nad Orlicí	6,224	Hradec Králové
Dubňany	6,179	South Moravian
Slavičín	6,168	Zlín
Týniště nad Orlicí	6,133	Hradec Králové
Hronov	6,063	Hradec Králové
Železný Brod	5,993	Liberec
Rousínov	5,948	South Moravian
Tanvald	5,941	Liberec
Třebechovice pod Orebem	5,907	Hradec Králové
Třešť	5,801	Vysočina
Žamberk	5,770	Pardubice
Týnec nad Sázavou	5,732	Central Bohemian
Kojetín	5,721	Olomouc
Nové Strašecí	5,710	Central Bohemian
Hluboká nad Vltavou	5,679	South Bohemian
Modřice	5,673	South Moravian
Lomnice nad Popelkou	5,649	Liberec
Františkovy Lázně	5,648	Karlovy Vary
Moravský Krumlov	5,635	South Moravian
Chlumec nad Cidlinou	5,606	Hradec Králové
Zubří	5,603	Zlín
Kunovice	5,592	Zlín
Šluknov	5,569	Ústí nad Labem
Rudná	5,560	Central Bohemian
Velká Bíteš	5,535	Vysočina
Planá	5,528	Plzeň
Hradec nad Moravicí	5,444	Moravian-Silesian
Kosmonosy	5,437	Central Bohemian
Holýšov	5,436	Plzeň
Fulnek	5,436	Moravian-Silesian
Vítkov	5,430	Moravian-Silesian
Úpice	5,379	Hradec Králové
Brumov-Bylnice	5,372	Zlín
Stochov	5,362	Central Bohemian
Bakov nad Jizerou	5,355	Central Bohemian
Unhošť	5,324	Central Bohemian
Jilemnice	5,312	Liberec
Polná	5,305	Vysočina
Jílové u Prahy	5,301	Central Bohemian
Trhové Sviny	5,292	South Bohemian
Starý Plzenec	5,290	Plzeň
Strážnice	5,282	South Moravian
Jablunkov	5,225	Moravian-Silesian
Chýně	5,168	Central Bohemian
Kdyně	5,132	Plzeň
Doksy	5,121	Liberec
Třemošná	5,112	Plzeň
Telč	5,105	Vysočina
Horšovský Týn	5,098	Plzeň
Horní Slavkov	5,071	Karlovy Vary
Skuteč	5,061	Pardubice
Horažďovice	5,056	Plzeň
Nýrsko	5,023	Plzeň
Česká Kamenice	4,984	Ústí nad Labem
Luhačovice	4,978	Zlín
Česká Skalice	4,970	Hradec Králové
Pečky	4,951	Central Bohemian
Heřmanův Městec	4,933	Pardubice
Jílové	4,891	Ústí nad Labem
Valašské Klobouky	4,864	Zlín
Oslavany	4,844	South Moravian
Bor	4,824	Plzeň
Bělá pod Bezdězem	4,815	Central Bohemian
Votice	4,777	Central Bohemian
Zruč nad Sázavou	4,777	Central Bohemian
Vizovice	4,776	Zlín
Bechyně	4,757	South Bohemian
Pacov	4,757	Vysočina
Ledeč nad Sázavou	4,756	Vysočina
Náměšť nad Oslavou	4,738	Vysočina
Protivín	4,706	South Bohemian
Bystřice	4,694	Central Bohemian
Lišov	4,670	South Bohemian
Postoloprty	4,661	Ústí nad Labem
Vrbno pod Pradědem	4,627	Moravian-Silesian
Habartov	4,614	Karlovy Vary
Planá nad Lužnicí	4,604	South Bohemian
Chropyně	4,582	Zlín
Vamberk	4,580	Hradec Králové
Adamov	4,564	South Moravian
Kynšperk nad Ohří	4,537	Karlovy Vary
Vracov	4,528	South Moravian
Meziboří	4,526	Ústí nad Labem
Bzenec	4,525	South Moravian
Cvikov	4,520	Liberec
Osek	4,506	Ústí nad Labem
Kostelec nad Labem	4,459	Central Bohemian
Klimkovice	4,396	Moravian-Silesian
Bojkovice	4,395	Zlín
Sezemice	4,393	Pardubice
Kostelec nad Černými lesy	4,360	Central Bohemian
Nová Role	4,298	Karlovy Vary
Blovice	4,258	Plzeň
Rožmitál pod Třemšínem	4,255	Central Bohemian
Hluk	4,242	Zlín
Chlumec	4,228	Ústí nad Labem
Mnichovice	4,206	Central Bohemian
Uherský Ostroh	4,168	Zlín
Borovany	4,168	South Bohemian
Police nad Metují	4,164	Hradec Králové
Brušperk	4,157	Moravian-Silesian
Slatiňany	4,134	Pardubice
Zdice	4,125	Central Bohemian
Rajhrad	4,113	South Moravian
Hostinné	4,082	Hradec Králové
Buštěhrad	4,073	Central Bohemian
Jaroměřice nad Rokytnou	4,044	Vysočina
Králíky	4,042	Pardubice
Horní Bříza	4,041	Plzeň
Přibyslav	3,997	Vysočina
Klecany	3,997	Central Bohemian
Jemnice	3,979	Vysočina
Zlaté Hory	3,933	Olomouc
Sázava	3,906	Central Bohemian
Smržovka	3,901	Liberec
Brtnice	3,870	Vysočina
Velké Bílovice	3,862	South Moravian
Paskov	3,855	Moravian-Silesian
Velešín	3,846	South Bohemian
Fryšták	3,826	Zlín
Dolní Benešov	3,824	Moravian-Silesian
Dobřichovice	3,821	Central Bohemian
Kamenický Šenov	3,791	Liberec
Řevnice	3,786	Central Bohemian
Stráž pod Ralskem	3,773	Liberec
Lom	3,755	Ústí nad Labem
Větřní	3,753	South Bohemian
Rájec-Jestřebí	3,740	South Moravian
Velká Bystřice	3,736	Olomouc
Nové Město pod Smrkem	3,713	Liberec
Zbýšov	3,707	South Moravian
Lázně Bělohrad	3,701	Hradec Králové
Stod	3,694	Plzeň
Kamenice nad Lipou	3,687	Vysočina
České Velenice	3,687	South Bohemian
Jablonné v Podještědí	3,672	Liberec
Židlochovice	3,662	South Moravian
Volary	3,657	South Bohemian
Dobrovice	3,643	Central Bohemian
Lanžhot	3,625	South Moravian
Libčice nad Vltavou	3,575	Central Bohemian
Valtice	3,568	South Moravian
Suchdol nad Lužnicí	3,559	South Bohemian
Březnice	3,546	Central Bohemian
Nepomuk	3,538	Plzeň
Libušín	3,534	Central Bohemian
Veverská Bítýška	3,521	South Moravian
Štěpánov	3,489	Olomouc
Benešov nad Ploučnicí	3,485	Ústí nad Labem
Štramberk	3,478	Moravian-Silesian
Jiříkov	3,472	Ústí nad Labem
Toužim	3,458	Karlovy Vary
Kralovice	3,450	Plzeň
Zliv	3,426	South Bohemian
Újezd u Brna	3,422	South Moravian
Velké Opatovice	3,410	South Moravian
Třemošnice	3,380	Pardubice
Libochovice	3,375	Ústí nad Labem
Trmice	3,372	Ústí nad Labem
Staňkov	3,363	Plzeň
Hrušovany nad Jevišovkou	3,354	South Moravian
Město Albrechtice	3,338	Moravian-Silesian
Lázně Bohdaneč	3,323	Pardubice
Sadská	3,308	Central Bohemian
Krásná Lípa	3,296	Ústí nad Labem
Košťany	3,264	Ústí nad Labem
Nová Bystřice	3,209	South Bohemian
Chrast	3,181	Pardubice
Velvary	3,147	Central Bohemian
Smiřice	3,142	Hradec Králové
Žirovnice	3,135	Vysočina
Opočno	3,118	Hradec Králové
Uhlířské Janovice	3,114	Central Bohemian
Velké Pavlovice	3,112	South Moravian
Žacléř	3,097	Hradec Králové
Kaznějov	3,087	Plzeň
Jablonné nad Orlicí	3,085	Pardubice
Loštice	3,078	Olomouc
Ždírec nad Doubravou	3,064	Vysočina
Dolní Bousov	3,059	Central Bohemian
Spálené Poříčí	3,034	Plzeň
Volyně	3,033	South Bohemian
Hodkovice nad Mohelkou	3,024	Liberec
Miroslav	3,019	South Moravian
Morkovice-Slížany	2,998	Zlín
Ivanovice na Hané	2,996	South Moravian
Loket	2,990	Karlovy Vary
Desná	2,986	Liberec
Sedlec-Prčice	2,952	Central Bohemian
Kunštát	2,946	South Moravian
Slušovice	2,929	Zlín
Podivín	2,912	South Moravian
Teplá	2,909	Karlovy Vary
Zákupy	2,907	Liberec
Český Dub	2,901	Liberec
Chvaletice	2,897	Pardubice
Plasy	2,888	Plzeň
Městec Králové	2,867	Central Bohemian
Kostelec na Hané	2,857	Olomouc
Terezín	2,852	Ústí nad Labem
Rychnov u Jablonce nad Nisou	2,845	Liberec
Břidličná	2,843	Moravian-Silesian
Rtyně v Podkrkonoší	2,841	Hradec Králové
Hanušovice	2,837	Olomouc
Jevíčko	2,837	Pardubice
Golčův Jeníkov	2,835	Vysočina
Úštěk	2,830	Ústí nad Labem
Budišov nad Budišovkou	2,787	Moravian-Silesian
Raspenava	2,784	Liberec
Neveklov	2,779	Central Bohemian
Moravský Beroun	2,775	Olomouc
Dašice	2,773	Pardubice
Rotava	2,753	Karlovy Vary
Vejprty	2,750	Ústí nad Labem
Koryčany	2,744	Zlín
Hejnice	2,726	Liberec
Velké Hamry	2,716	Liberec
Mladá Vožice	2,711	South Bohemian
Hrádek	2,705	Plzeň
Kelč	2,700	Zlín
Vyšší Brod	2,649	South Bohemian
Březová	2,640	Karlovy Vary
Dolní Kounice	2,635	South Moravian
Konice	2,620	Olomouc
Rudolfov	2,617	South Bohemian
Luže	2,589	Pardubice
Chabařovice	2,564	Ústí nad Labem
Chýnov	2,563	South Bohemian
Ždánice	2,549	South Moravian
Nechanice	2,545	Hradec Králové
Javorník	2,544	Olomouc
Nové Sedlo	2,527	Karlovy Vary
Solnice	2,515	Hradec Králové
Zbiroh	2,500	Plzeň
Město Touškov	2,495	Plzeň
Netolice	2,494	South Bohemian
Tovačov	2,472	Olomouc
Klobouky u Brna	2,471	South Moravian
Rokytnice nad Jizerou	2,459	Liberec
Janovice nad Úhlavou	2,455	Plzeň
Počátky	2,452	Vysočina
Nové Hrady	2,432	South Bohemian
Sobotka	2,401	Hradec Králové
Bohušovice nad Ohří	2,393	Ústí nad Labem
Pyšely	2,361	Central Bohemian
Kryry	2,355	Ústí nad Labem
Karolinka	2,340	Zlín
Veltrusy	2,328	Central Bohemian
Meziměstí	2,283	Hradec Králové
Plumlov	2,271	Olomouc
Jáchymov	2,248	Karlovy Vary
Žebrák	2,243	Central Bohemian
Kardašova Řečice	2,227	South Bohemian
Mirošov	2,216	Plzeň
Horní Benešov	2,214	Moravian-Silesian
Ralsko	2,209	Liberec
Slavonice	2,207	South Bohemian
Hrochův Týnec	2,187	Pardubice
Zásmuky	2,182	Central Bohemian
Hroznětín	2,179	Karlovy Vary
Týnec nad Labem	2,173	Central Bohemian
Nová Včelnice	2,165	South Bohemian
Nový Knín	2,156	Central Bohemian
Žlutice	2,153	Karlovy Vary
Horní Jiřetín	2,153	Ústí nad Labem
Budyně nad Ohří	2,152	Ústí nad Labem
Horní Jelení	2,149	Pardubice
Luby	2,147	Karlovy Vary
Proseč	2,143	Pardubice
Kopidlno	2,135	Hradec Králové
Jistebnice	2,121	South Bohemian
Rokytnice v Orlických horách	2,113	Hradec Králové
Hranice	2,070	Karlovy Vary
Mikulášovice	2,060	Ústí nad Labem
Borohrádek	2,059	Hradec Králové
Velký Šenov	1,996	Ústí nad Labem
Hrob	1,987	Ústí nad Labem
Smečno	1,985	Central Bohemian
Kouřim	1,981	Central Bohemian
Hostomice	1,961	Central Bohemian
Lučany nad Nisou	1,958	Liberec
Horní Planá	1,933	South Bohemian
Svoboda nad Úpou	1,923	Hradec Králové
Libáň	1,918	Hradec Králové
Žandov	1,915	Liberec
Němčice nad Hanou	1,902	Olomouc
Štíty	1,892	Olomouc
Plesná	1,890	Karlovy Vary
Třebenice	1,885	Ústí nad Labem
Bochov	1,876	Karlovy Vary
Skalná	1,875	Karlovy Vary
Horní Cerekev	1,872	Vysočina
Seč	1,869	Pardubice
Vroutek	1,860	Ústí nad Labem
Radnice	1,829	Plzeň
Černovice	1,782	Vysočina
Hrotovice	1,779	Vysočina
Lomnice nad Lužnicí	1,779	South Bohemian
Hoštka	1,764	Ústí nad Labem
Všeruby	1,746	Plzeň
Vlachovo Březí	1,738	South Bohemian
Bělá nad Radbuzou	1,733	Plzeň
Rožďalovice	1,716	Central Bohemian
Nasavrky	1,690	Pardubice
Dubá	1,682	Liberec
Ronov nad Doubravou	1,677	Pardubice
Dolní Poustevna	1,673	Ústí nad Labem
Švihov	1,673	Plzeň
Bavorov	1,672	South Bohemian
Kladruby	1,668	Plzeň
Staré Město	1,667	Olomouc
Mýto	1,640	Plzeň
Jesenice	1,638	Central Bohemian
Plánice	1,627	Plzeň
Mirovice	1,627	South Bohemian
Oloví	1,618	Karlovy Vary
Olešnice	1,610	South Moravian
Jablonec nad Jizerou	1,592	Liberec
Teplice nad Metují	1,584	Hradec Králové
Železná Ruda	1,580	Plzeň
Březová nad Svitavou	1,578	Pardubice
Bystré	1,561	Pardubice
Přimda	1,555	Plzeň
Poběžovice	1,541	Plzeň
Kožlany	1,520	Plzeň
Trhový Štěpánov	1,489	Central Bohemian
Železnice	1,435	Hradec Králové
Mšeno	1,406	Central Bohemian
Lázně Kynžvart	1,403	Karlovy Vary
Husinec	1,389	South Bohemian
Strmilov	1,381	South Bohemian
Strážov	1,374	Plzeň
Rovensko pod Troskami	1,369	Liberec
Kašperské Hory	1,369	Plzeň
Kasejovice	1,368	Plzeň
Harrachov	1,361	Liberec
Svratka	1,358	Vysočina
Habry	1,319	Vysočina
Chřibská	1,316	Ústí nad Labem
Brandýs nad Orlicí	1,293	Pardubice
Vysoké nad Jizerou	1,263	Liberec
Sedlice	1,258	South Bohemian
Potštát	1,241	Olomouc
Hostouň	1,224	Plzeň
Pilníkov	1,209	Hradec Králové
Mirotice	1,207	South Bohemian
Osečná	1,199	Liberec
Černošín	1,193	Plzeň
Vidnava	1,192	Olomouc
Verneřice	1,166	Ústí nad Labem
Úsov	1,162	Olomouc
Jevišovice	1,156	South Moravian
Nalžovské Hory	1,151	Plzeň
Krásná Hora nad Vltavou	1,144	Central Bohemian
Manětín	1,143	Plzeň
Měčín	1,120	Plzeň
Žulová	1,119	Olomouc
Špindlerův Mlýn	1,089	Hradec Králové
Liběchov	1,077	Central Bohemian
Blšany	1,039	Ústí nad Labem
Bělčice	1,031	South Bohemian
Červená Řečice	1,026	Vysočina
Miletín	951	Hradec Králové
Hartmanice	929	Plzeň
Bezdružice	924	Plzeň
Bečov nad Teplou	911	Karlovy Vary
Miličín	896	Central Bohemian
Vysoké Veselí	889	Hradec Králové
Stráž nad Nežárkou	877	South Bohemian
Abertamy	817	Karlovy Vary
Deštná	738	South Bohemian
Krásno	712	Karlovy Vary
Pec pod Sněžkou	696	Hradec Králové
Lipnice nad Sázavou	653	Vysočina
Janské Lázně	647	Hradec Králové
Stárkov	646	Hradec Králové
Chyše	586	Karlovy Vary
Mašťov	565	Ústí nad Labem
Ledvice	540	Ústí nad Labem
Rabí	504	Plzeň
Hora Svaté Kateřiny	476	Ústí nad Labem
Úterý	434	Plzeň
Krásné Údolí	389	Karlovy Vary
Rožmberk nad Vltavou	369	South Bohemian
Andělská Hora	355	Moravian-Silesian
Horní Blatná	350	Karlovy Vary
Výsluní	299	Ústí nad Labem
Janov	258	Moravian-Silesian
Boží Dar	250	Karlovy Vary
Rejštejn	234	Plzeň
Loučná pod Klínovcem	214	Ústí nad Labem
Přebuz	67	Karlovy Vary

== Market towns ==
Name	Population (2026)	Region
Nehvizdy	4,528	Central Bohemian
Luka nad Jihlavou	3,184	Vysočina
Křemže	3,012	South Bohemian
Jedovnice	2,947	South Moravian
Suchdol nad Odrou	2,902	Moravian-Silesian
Moravská Nová Ves	2,690	South Moravian
Ledenice	2,528	South Bohemian
Všetaty	2,495	Central Bohemian
Nový Hrozenkov	2,480	Zlín
Jince	2,468	Central Bohemian
Batelov	2,458	Vysočina
Komárov	2,439	Central Bohemian
Pozořice	2,424	South Moravian
Buchlovice	2,376	Zlín
Peruc	2,374	Ústí nad Labem
Velké Poříčí	2,310	Hradec Králové
Mladé Buky	2,301	Hradec Králové
Zlonice	2,275	Central Bohemian
Škvorec	2,269	Central Bohemian
Náměšť na Hané	2,255	Olomouc
Štěchovice	2,208	Central Bohemian
Lhenice	2,161	South Bohemian
Černá Hora	2,124	South Moravian
Drásov	2,101	South Moravian
Červené Pečky	2,098	Central Bohemian
Polešovice	2,047	Zlín
Měřín	2,009	Vysočina
Okříšky	2,007	Vysočina
Chodová Planá	2,004	Plzeň
Štoky	1,980	Vysočina
Kamenice	1,973	Vysočina
Lysice	1,970	South Moravian
Svitávka	1,965	South Moravian
Cerhenice	1,955	Central Bohemian
Plaňany	1,931	Central Bohemian
Davle	1,911	Central Bohemian
Velké Němčice	1,886	South Moravian
Malšice	1,880	South Bohemian
Divišov	1,849	Central Bohemian
Brodek u Přerova	1,843	Olomouc
Drnholec	1,817	South Moravian
Chlum u Třeboně	1,815	South Bohemian
Křižanov	1,811	Vysočina
Doudleby nad Orlicí	1,791	Hradec Králové
Kounice	1,755	Central Bohemian
Dolní Bukovsko	1,731	South Bohemian
Stařeč	1,713	Vysočina
Kralice na Hané	1,707	Olomouc
Hustopeče nad Bečvou	1,705	Olomouc
Častolovice	1,671	Hradec Králové
Dub nad Moravou	1,619	Olomouc
Svatava	1,593	Karlovy Vary
Krucemburk	1,583	Vysočina
Nezamyslice	1,508	Olomouc
Lázně Toušeň	1,500	Central Bohemian
Želetava	1,476	Vysočina
Lomnice	1,470	South Moravian
Brodek u Prostějova	1,450	Olomouc
Čechtice	1,448	Central Bohemian
Chotětov	1,439	Central Bohemian
Dřevohostice	1,427	Olomouc
Kolinec	1,427	Plzeň
Loučeň	1,422	Central Bohemian
Velký Újezd	1,415	Olomouc
Březová	1,410	Moravian-Silesian
Klenčí pod Čerchovem	1,409	Plzeň
Bernartice	1,402	South Bohemian
Křinec	1,391	Central Bohemian
Ševětín	1,388	South Bohemian
Mohelno	1,383	Vysočina
Nosislav	1,375	South Moravian
Stráž	1,369	Plzeň
Nové Veselí	1,369	Vysočina
Radomyšl	1,359	South Bohemian
Frymburk	1,347	South Bohemian
Sepekov	1,344	South Bohemian
Katovice	1,336	South Bohemian
Brozany nad Ohří	1,335	Ústí nad Labem
Dolní Čermná	1,326	Pardubice
Pozlovice	1,322	Zlín
Strunkovice nad Blanicí	1,313	South Bohemian
Senomaty	1,307	Central Bohemian
Doubravice nad Svitavou	1,294	South Moravian
Chroustovice	1,292	Pardubice
Pecka	1,273	Hradec Králové
Nedvědice	1,268	South Moravian
Liteň	1,267	Central Bohemian
Radiměř	1,260	Pardubice
Dolní Cerekev	1,245	Vysočina
Choltice	1,244	Pardubice
Netvořice	1,211	Central Bohemian
Cerhovice	1,209	Central Bohemian
Blížkovice	1,204	South Moravian
Hostomice	1,203	Ústí nad Labem
Nová Cerekev	1,196	Vysočina
Budišov	1,193	Vysočina
Bohdalov	1,180	Vysočina
Olbramovice	1,177	South Moravian
Jimramov	1,168	Vysočina
Vladislav	1,151	Vysočina
Načeradec	1,148	Central Bohemian
Šatov	1,144	South Moravian
Brodce	1,137	Central Bohemian
Česká Bělá	1,136	Vysočina
Deblín	1,131	South Moravian
Suchdol	1,108	Central Bohemian
Protivanov	1,095	Olomouc
Cítoliby	1,093	Ústí nad Labem
Ostrov u Macochy	1,091	South Moravian
Vrchotovy Janovice	1,079	Central Bohemian
Višňové	1,077	South Moravian
Stonařov	1,075	Vysočina
Pavlíkov	1,071	Central Bohemian
Malešov	1,065	Central Bohemian
Březno	1,060	Central Bohemian
Machov	1,052	Hradec Králové
Švábenice	1,052	South Moravian
Kněževes	1,025	Central Bohemian
Koloveč	1,011	Plzeň
Trhová Kamenice	1,007	Pardubice
Ostrov nad Oslavou	1,000	Vysočina
Bezno	993	Central Bohemian
Nový Rychnov	985	Vysočina
Vilémov	985	Vysočina
Havlíčkova Borová	983	Vysočina
Knínice	979	South Moravian
Zápy	974	Central Bohemian
Kovářská	966	Ústí nad Labem
Lukavec	965	Vysočina
Měcholupy	962	Ústí nad Labem
Sloup	962	South Moravian
Boleradice	949	South Moravian
Radostín nad Oslavou	945	Vysočina
Dyjákovice	932	South Moravian
Kunvald	929	Pardubice
Litultovice	929	Moravian-Silesian
Spálov	917	Moravian-Silesian
Hořice na Šumavě	913	South Bohemian
Nové Dvory	910	Central Bohemian
Čistá	907	Central Bohemian
Osvětimany	906	Zlín
Žehušice	905	Central Bohemian
Brankovice	904	South Moravian
Bobrová	904	Vysočina
Zásada	901	Liberec
Libštát	900	Liberec
Medlov	896	South Moravian
Štěkeň	891	South Bohemian
Čestice	887	South Bohemian
Nový Hrádek	887	Hradec Králové
Mšec	879	Central Bohemian
Mrákotín	870	Vysočina
Prosiměřice	867	South Moravian
Libice nad Doubravou	858	Vysočina
Žinkovy	857	Plzeň
Nová Říše	851	Vysočina
Ostrovačice	849	South Moravian
Strážek	847	Vysočina
Doubravník	842	South Moravian
Rokytnice nad Rokytnou	836	Vysočina
Karlštejn	833	Central Bohemian
Besednice	824	South Bohemian
Křtiny	814	South Moravian
Kácov	812	Central Bohemian
Všeruby	806	Plzeň
Maršovice	796	Central Bohemian
Vojnův Městec	792	Vysočina
Vysoký Chlumec	790	Central Bohemian
Vraný	780	Central Bohemian
Troskotovice	778	South Moravian
Vranov nad Dyjí	777	South Moravian
Chudenice	777	Plzeň
Sněžné	765	Vysočina
Opatov	765	Vysočina
Slabce	734	Central Bohemian
Borotín	724	South Bohemian
Úsobí	724	Vysočina
Štěpánov nad Svratkou	722	Vysočina
Přídolí	719	South Bohemian
Dešenice	696	Plzeň
Vémyslice	687	South Moravian
Štítary	681	South Moravian
Horní Dunajovice	675	South Moravian
Černý Důl	674	Hradec Králové
Oleksovice	669	South Moravian
Mikulovice	669	South Moravian
Slavětín	667	Ústí nad Labem
Louňovice pod Blaníkem	665	Central Bohemian
Křivoklát	655	Central Bohemian
Větrný Jeníkov	650	Vysočina
Bojanov	648	Pardubice
Stará Říše	627	Vysočina
Choustníkovo Hradiště	624	Hradec Králové
Božejov	624	Vysočina
České Heřmanice	606	Pardubice
Ročov	587	Ústí nad Labem
Bílé Podolí	582	Central Bohemian
Stádlec	582	South Bohemian
Hvězdlice	576	South Moravian
Dalešice	567	Vysočina
Včelákov	562	Pardubice
Neustupov	562	Central Bohemian
Rataje nad Sázavou	560	Central Bohemian
Mladkov	555	Pardubice
Mlázovice	551	Hradec Králové
Holany	550	Liberec
Drahany	538	Olomouc
Olbramkostel	524	South Moravian
Zdislavice	517	Central Bohemian
Uhelná Příbram	511	Vysočina
Podhradí	500	Hradec Králové
Křivsoudov	490	Central Bohemian
Čachrov	485	Plzeň
Staré Město pod Landštejnem	466	South Bohemian
Litenčice	461	Zlín
Tištín	461	Olomouc
Panenský Týnec	458	Ústí nad Labem
Nepomyšl	430	Ústí nad Labem
Dub	425	South Bohemian
Strážný	405	South Bohemian
Heraltice	383	Vysočina
Sovínky	371	Central Bohemian
Běhařovice	369	South Moravian
Svojanov	352	Pardubice
Žernov	327	Hradec Králové
Žumberk	289	Pardubice
Zdislava	271	Liberec
Vratěnín	270	South Moravian
Liblín	268	Plzeň
Lukov	256	South Moravian
Velký Vřešťov	252	Hradec Králové
Zvíkovec	201	Plzeň
Český Šternberk	179	Central Bohemian
Levín	160	Ústí nad Labem

== Other municipalities with more than 4,000 inhabitants ==
Name	Population (2026)	Region
Horoměřice	5,586	Central Bohemian
Dolní Lutyně	5,350	Moravian-Silesian
Kamenice	5,307	Central Bohemian
Bystřice	5,262	Moravian-Silesian
Petrovice u Karviné	4,973	Moravian-Silesian
Ludgeřovice	4,959	Moravian-Silesian
Těrlicko	4,876	Moravian-Silesian
Dolní Břežany	4,806	Central Bohemian
Vejprnice	4,665	Plzeň
Dětmarovice	4,512	Moravian-Silesian
Vendryně	4,511	Moravian-Silesian
Bolatice	4,508	Moravian-Silesian
Horní Suchá	4,341	Moravian-Silesian
Psáry	4,322	Central Bohemian
Šestajovice	4,220	Central Bohemian
Hlubočky	4,176	Olomouc
Zdiby	4,088	Central Bohemian
Baška	4,056	Moravian-Silesian
