= Opatov (Třebíč District) =

- Market town
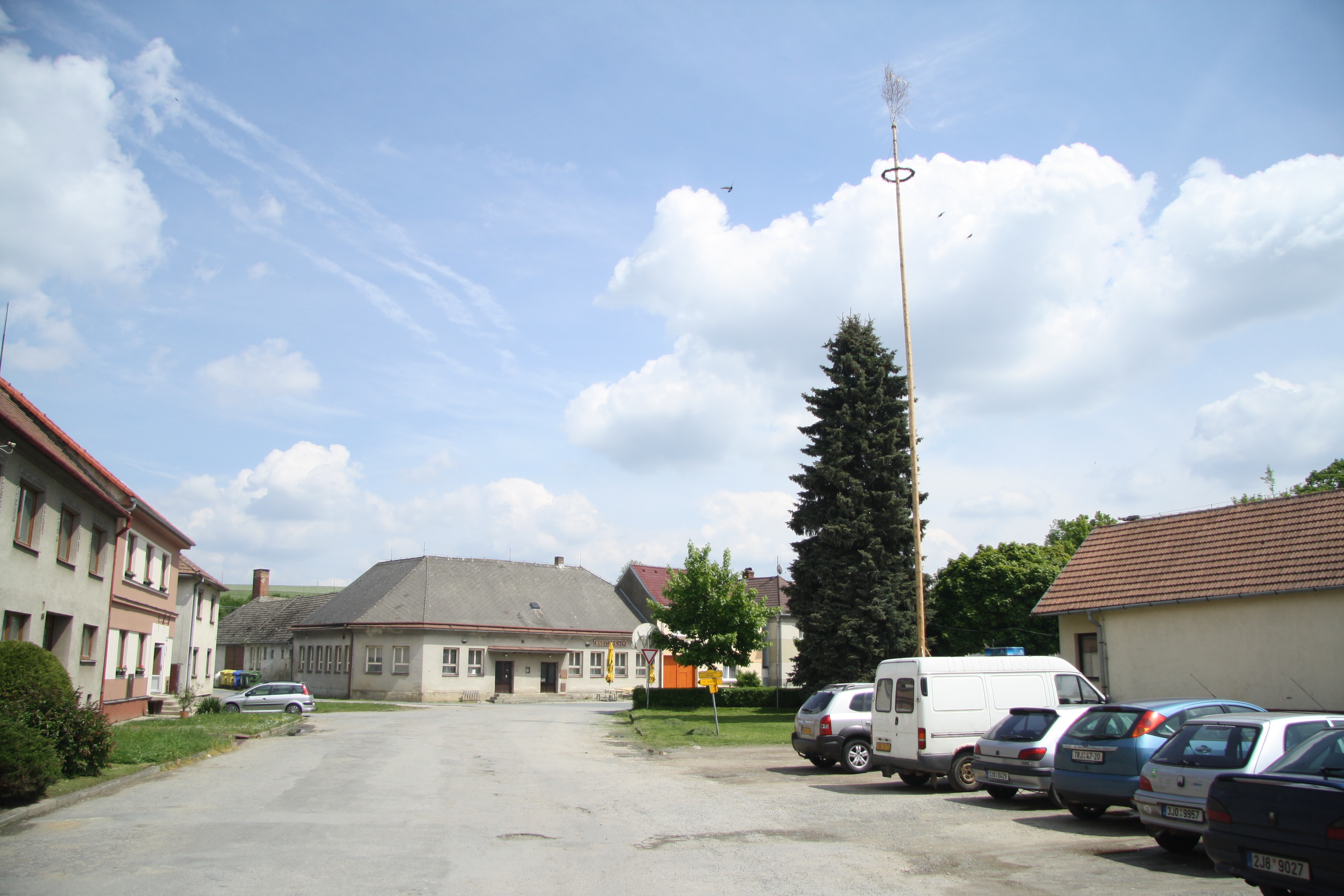
- Centre of Opatov

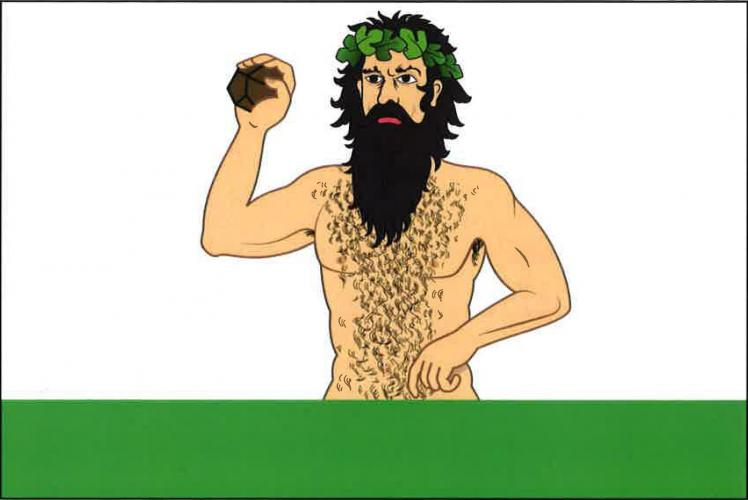
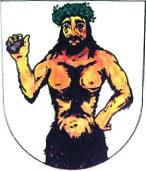
- Flag Coat of arms

- Location in the Czech Republic
- Coordinates: 49°13′28″N 15°39′42″E
- Country: Czech Republic
- Region: Vysočina
- District: Třebíč
- First mentioned: 1068

Area
  - Total: 19.03 km^{2} (7.35 sq mi)
- Elevation: 582 m (1,909 ft)

Population (2026-01-01)
  - Total: 765
  - Density: 40.2/km^{2} (104/sq mi)
- Time zone: UTC+1 (CET)
  - Summer (DST): UTC+2 (CEST)
- Postal code: 675 28
- Website: www.opatov.cz

Opatov (Czech pronunciation: [ˈopatof]) is a market town in Třebíč District in the Vysočina Region of the Czech Republic. It has about 800 inhabitants.

== Geography ==
Opatov is located about 15 kilometres (9 mi) west of Třebíč and 19 km (12 mi) south of Jihlava. It lies in the Křižanov Highlands. The highest point is the Brtník hill at 681 m (2,234 ft) above sea level. The Brtnice River flows through the market town. There are several fishponds in the municipal territory.

== History ==
The first written mention of Opatov is from 1086. In 1487, it was bought by the Waldstein family. In 1540, the village was promoted to a market town. From 1623, Opatov was a property of the Collalto family. In 1662 or 1696 (according to various chroniclers), a large fire destroyed most of the market town.

== Demographics ==
Historical population

Year	Pop.	±%
1869	1,634	—
1880	1,596	−2.3%
1890	1,422	−10.9%
1900	1,390	−2.3%
1910	1,340	−3.6%

Year	Pop.	±%
1921	1,264	−5.7%
1930	1,196	−5.4%
1950	977	−18.3%
1961	1,035	+5.9%
1970	935	−9.7%

Year	Pop.	±%
1980	836	−10.6%
1991	853	+2.0%
2001	802	−6.0%
2011	732	−8.7%
2021	737	+0.7%

Source: Censuses

== Transport ==
There are no railways or major roads passing through the municipality.

== Sights ==
The main landmark of Opatov is the Church of Saint Bartholomew. It was built in the Neoclassical style in 1841–1844. Opposite the church stands a valuable Baroque rectory.
