= Besednice =

- Market town
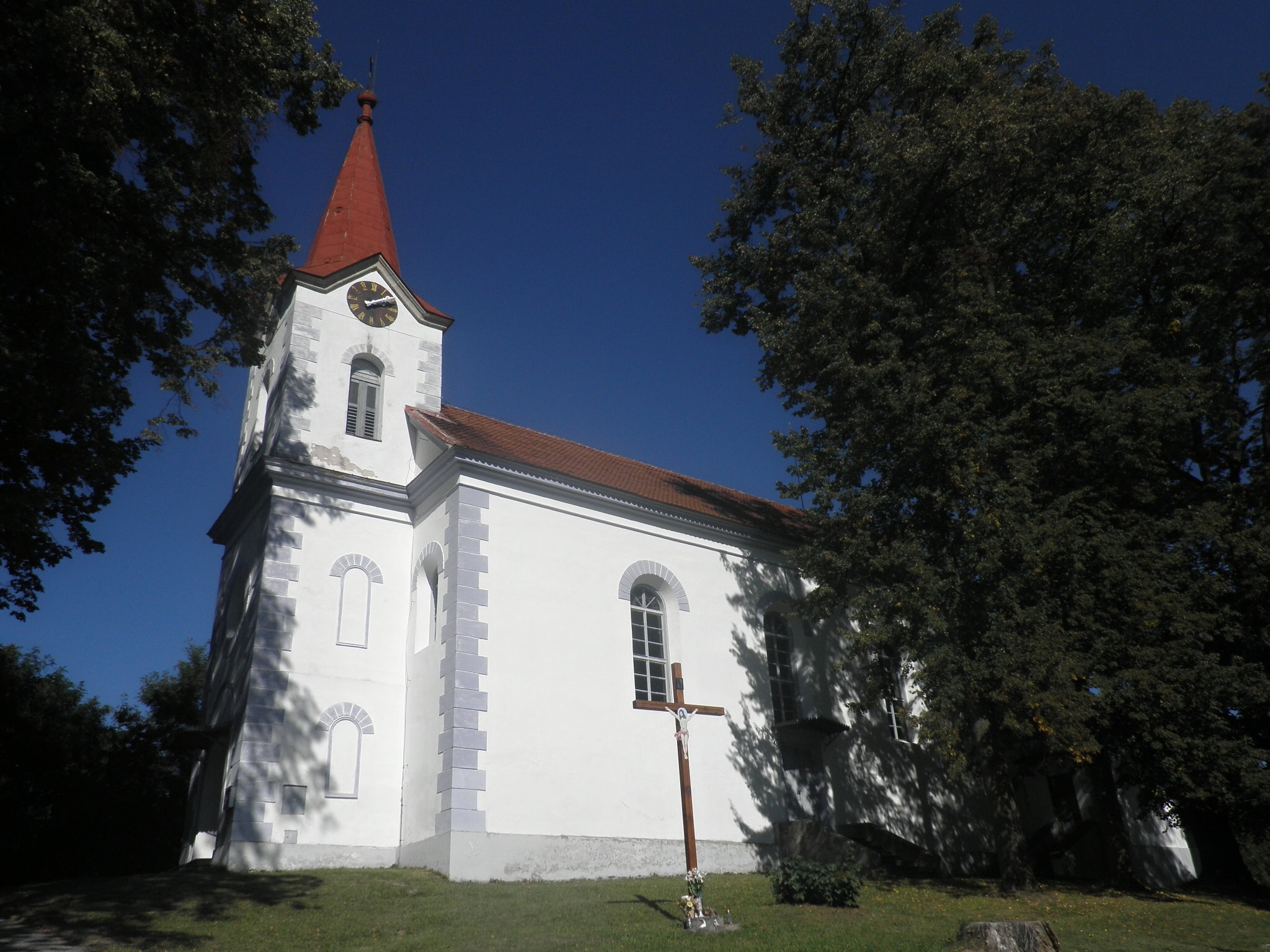
- Church of Saint Procopius

- Flag Coat of arms

- Location in the Czech Republic
- Coordinates: 48°47′24″N 14°33′25″E
- Country: Czech Republic
- Region: South Bohemian
- District: Český Krumlov
- First mentioned: 1395

Area
  - Total: 16.12 km^{2} (6.22 sq mi)
- Elevation: 575 m (1,886 ft)

Population (2026-01-01)
  - Total: 824
  - Density: 51.1/km^{2} (132/sq mi)
- Time zone: UTC+1 (CET)
  - Summer (DST): UTC+2 (CEST)
- Postal codes: 382 41, 382 81
- Website: www.besednice.cz

Besednice (Czech pronunciation: [ˈbɛsɛdɲɪtsɛ]; German: Bessenitz) is a market town in Český Krumlov District in the South Bohemian Region of the Czech Republic. It has about 800 inhabitants.

== Administrative division ==
Besednice consists of two municipal parts (in brackets population according to the 2021 census):

- Besednice (767)
- Malče (46)

== Etymology ==
The name is derived from the old Slavic word besěda, which denoted outdoor sitting.

== Geography ==
Besednice is located about 17 kilometres (11 mi) east of Český Krumlov and 20 km (12 mi) south of České Budějovice. It lies in the Gratzen Foothills. The highest point is the mountain Velký kámen at 753 m (2,470 ft) above sea level.

The brook Besednický potok flows through the market town. The landscape around Besednice near the Besednický potok is known as a site of the moldavites. It is protected as the Besednické vltavíny Nature Monument.

== History ==
The first written mention of Besednice is from 1395, when Henry III of Rosenberg donated the village to the parish church of St. Vitus in Český Krumlov. From that time until the establishment of an independent municipality in 1848, Besednice belonged to the Český Krumlov prelature.

Besednice was promoted to a market town in 1910.

== Demographics ==
Historical population

Year	Pop.	±%
1869	876	—
1880	934	+6.6%
1890	1,028	+10.1%
1900	1,069	+4.0%
1910	1,110	+3.8%

Year	Pop.	±%
1921	1,069	−3.7%
1930	898	−16.0%
1950	761	−15.3%
1961	818	+7.5%
1970	776	−5.1%

Year	Pop.	±%
1980	814	+4.9%
1991	770	−5.4%
2001	802	+4.2%
2011	831	+3.6%
2021	813	−2.2%

Source: Censuses

== Transport ==
There are no railways or major roads passing through the municipality.

== Sights ==
The most important monument is the Church of Saint Procopius. It was built in the Baroque style in 1738, then it was rebuilt in 1742–1745 and in the Neoclassical style in 1875.
