= Úsobí =

- Market town
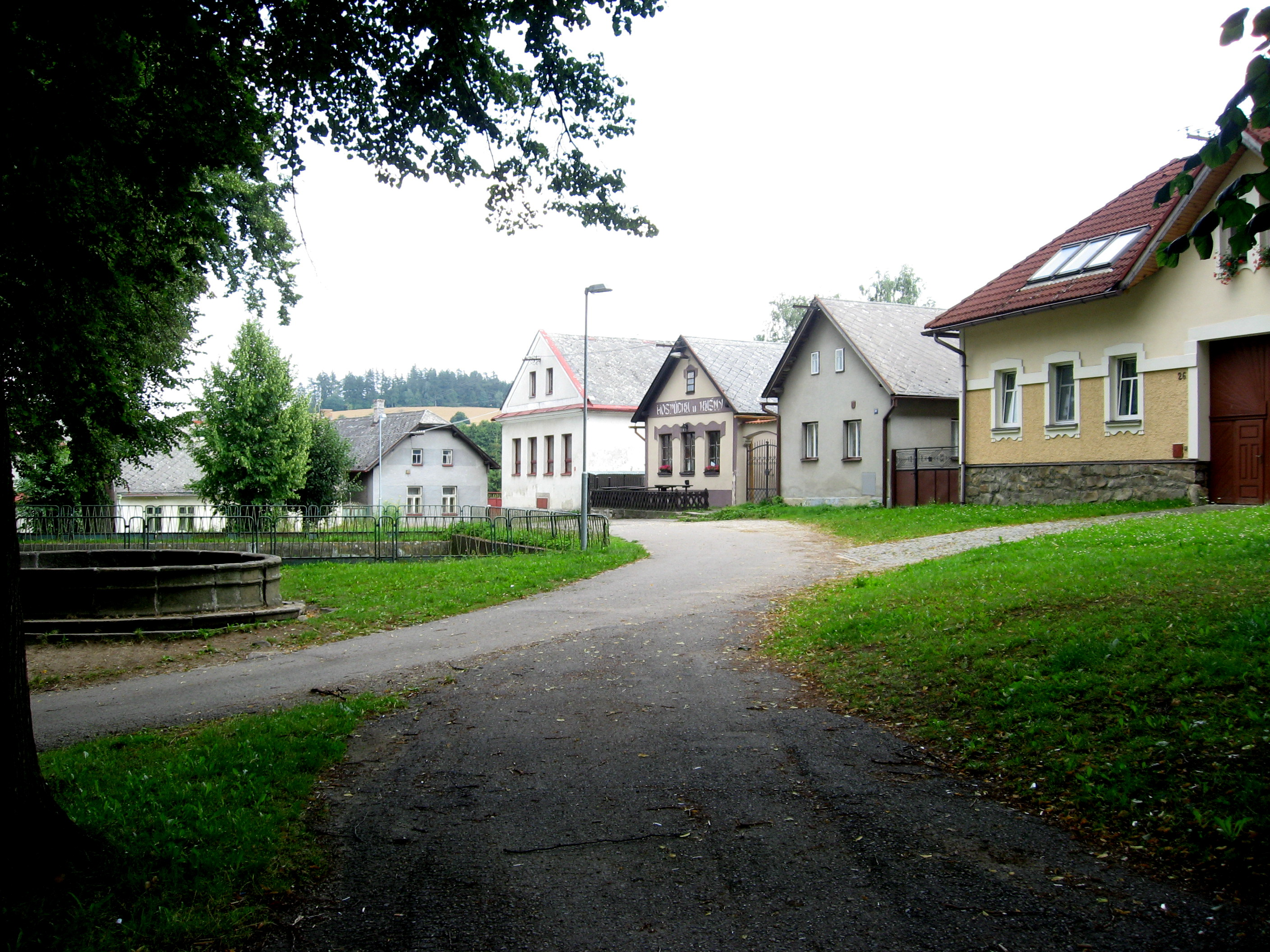
- Centre of Úsobí

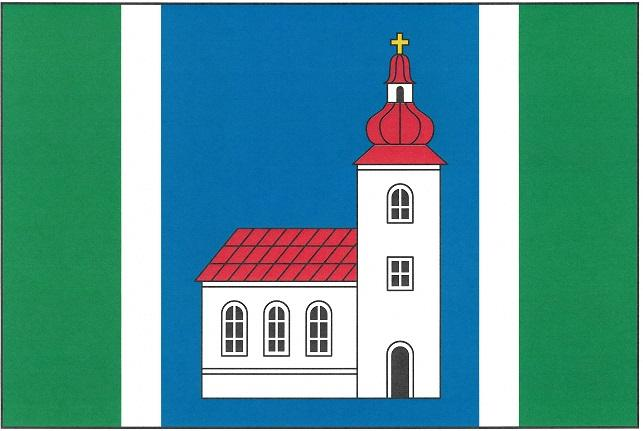
- Flag

- Location in the Czech Republic
- Coordinates: 49°30′51″N 15°30′9″E
- Country: Czech Republic
- Region: Vysočina
- District: Havlíčkův Brod
- First mentioned: 1307

Area
  - Total: 12.97 km^{2} (5.01 sq mi)
- Elevation: 555 m (1,821 ft)

Population (2026-01-01)
  - Total: 724
  - Density: 55.8/km^{2} (145/sq mi)
- Time zone: UTC+1 (CET)
  - Summer (DST): UTC+2 (CEST)
- Postal codes: 582 53, 582 54
- Website: www.usobi.cz

Úsobí (Czech pronunciation: [ˈuːsobiː]; German: Pollerskirchen) is a market town in Havlíčkův Brod District in the Vysočina Region of the Czech Republic. It has about 700 inhabitants.

== Administrative division ==
Úsobí consists of three municipal parts (in brackets population according to the 2021 census):

- Úsobí (573)
- Chyška (83)
- Kosovy (20)

== Etymology ==
The name Úsobí is derived from the Old Czech verb usobiti, i.e. 'gain', 'acquire'. The word úsobí probably meant 'acquired assets'.

== Geography ==
Úsobí is located about 11 kilometres (7 mi) southwest of Havlíčkův Brod and 13 km (8 mi) northwest of Jihlava. It lies in the Křemešník Highlands. The highest point is a hill at 688 m (2,257 ft) above sea level. In the territory of Úsobí is a system of fishponds supplied by the stream Úsobský potok.

== History ==
The first written mention of Úsobí is from 1307. In 1789, the village was promoted to a market town.

== Demographics ==
Historical population

| Year | Pop. | ±% |
|---|---|---|
| 1869 | 1,445 | — |
| 1880 | 1,543 | +6.8% |
| 1890 | 1,509 | −2.2% |
| 1900 | 1,462 | −3.1% |
| 1910 | 1,572 | +7.5% |

| Year | Pop. | ±% |
|---|---|---|
| 1921 | 1,577 | +0.3% |
| 1930 | 1,390 | −11.9% |
| 1950 | 957 | −31.2% |
| 1961 | 1,043 | +9.0% |
| 1970 | 901 | −13.6% |

| Year | Pop. | ±% |
|---|---|---|
| 1980 | 840 | −6.8% |
| 1991 | 709 | −15.6% |
| 2001 | 706 | −0.4% |
| 2011 | 659 | −6.7% |
| 2021 | 676 | +2.6% |

Source: Censuses

== Economy ==
There was a 220-year tradition of glass manufacturing, commencing in 1779, with the initial site being the creation of a glass grinder underneath a pond.

== Transport ==
The D1 motorway from Prague to Brno runs through the southern part of the municipal territory.

== Sights ==
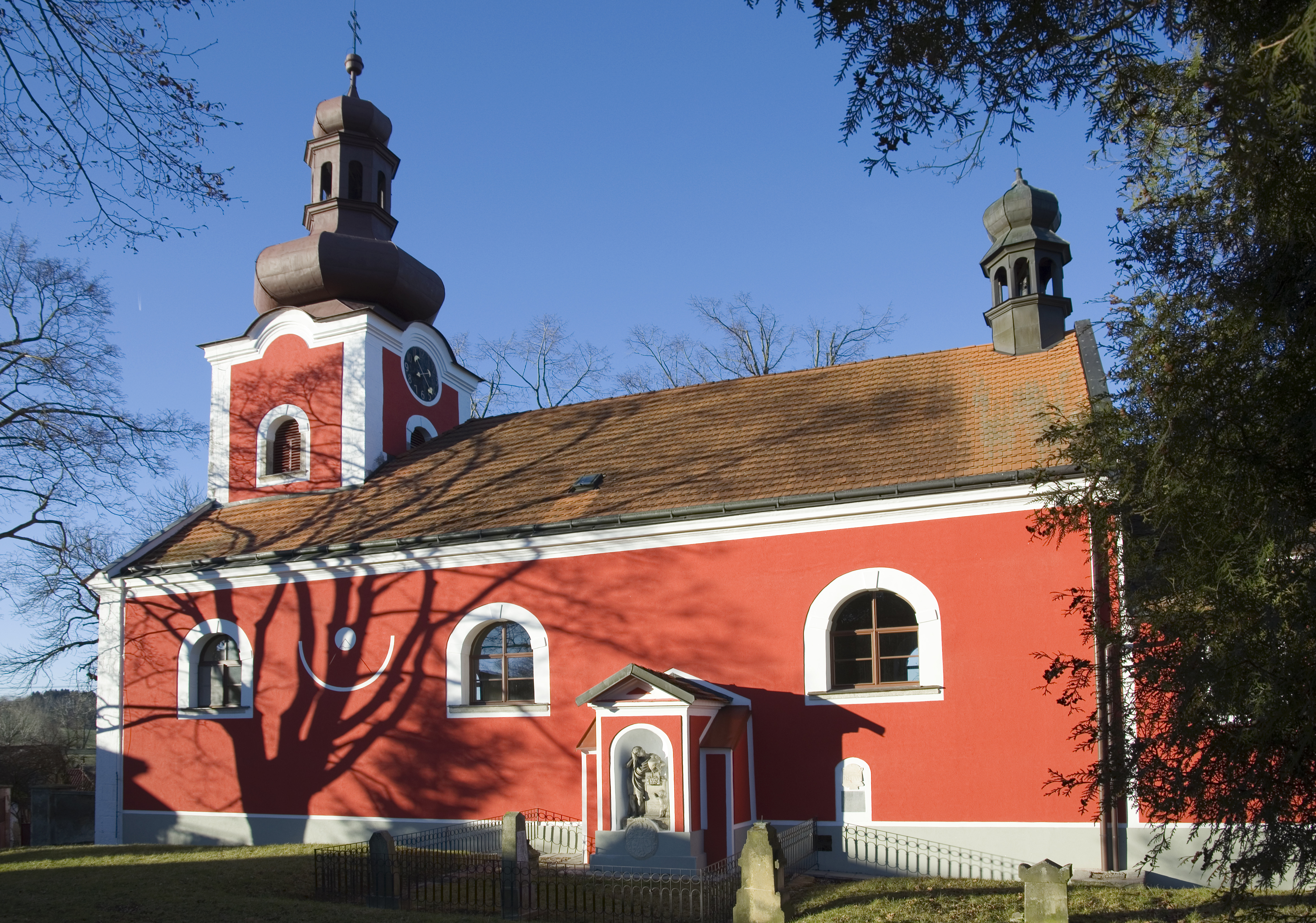
Church of Saints Peter and Paul

The main landmark of Úsobí is the Church of Saints Peter and Paul. It was originally a Gothic building from the 13th century, rebuilt to its current form in 1759–1760.
