= Štítary =

- Market town
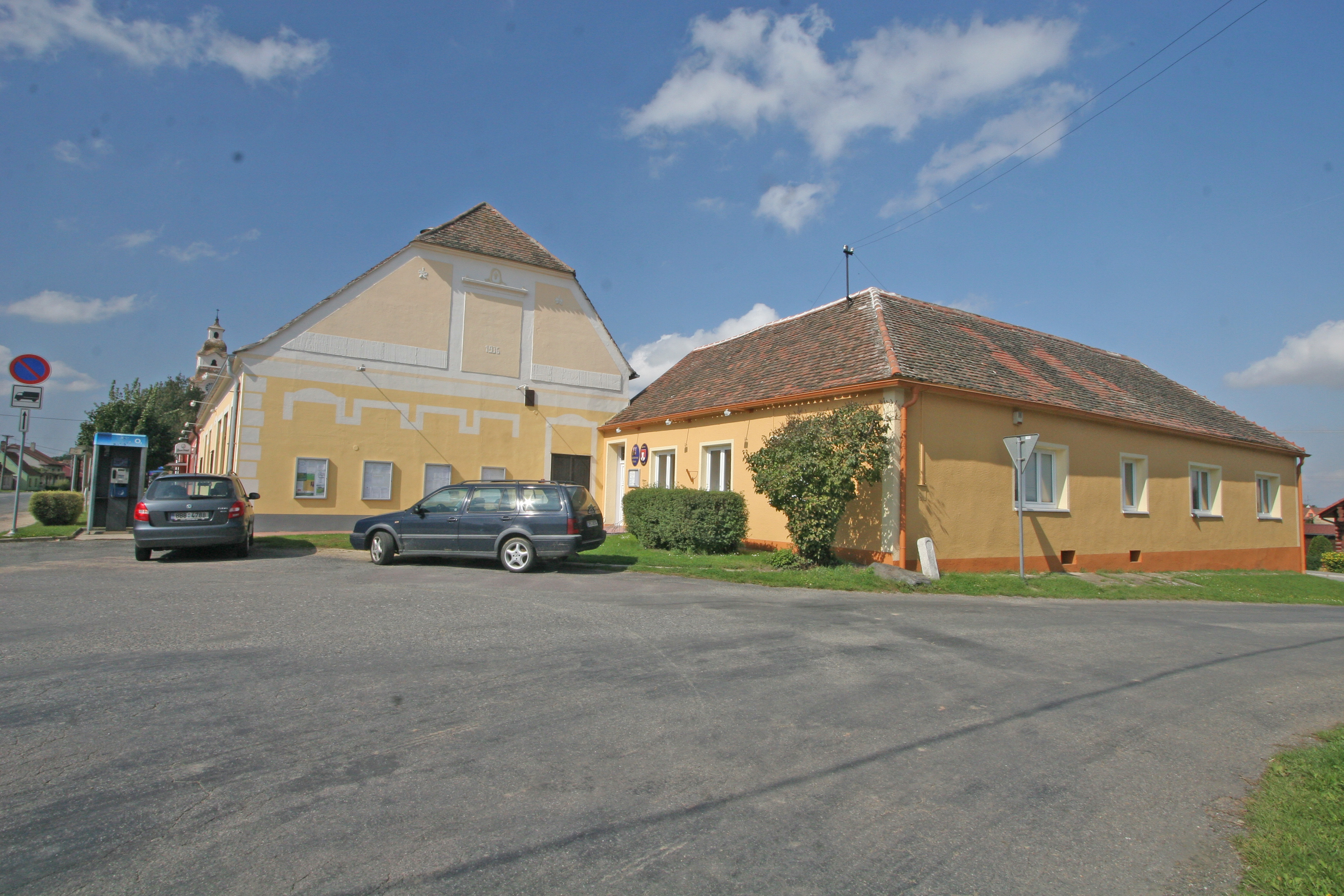
- Municipal office in the centre of Štítary

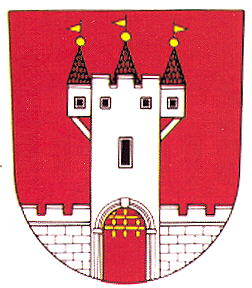
- Coat of arms

- Location in the Czech Republic
- Coordinates: 48°56′7″N 15°50′39″E
- Country: Czech Republic
- Region: South Moravian
- District: Znojmo
- First mentioned: 1346

Area
  - Total: 24.97 km^{2} (9.64 sq mi)
- Elevation: 398 m (1,306 ft)

Population (2026-01-01)
  - Total: 681
  - Density: 27.3/km^{2} (70.6/sq mi)
- Time zone: UTC+1 (CET)
  - Summer (DST): UTC+2 (CEST)
- Postal code: 671 02
- Website: www.obecstitary.cz

Štítary (Czech pronunciation: [ˈʃciːtarɪ]; German: Schiltern) is a market town in Znojmo District in the South Moravian Region of the Czech Republic. It has about 700 inhabitants.

== Geography ==
Štítary is located about 16 kilometres (10 mi) northwest of Znojmo and 61 km (38 mi) southwest of Brno. It lies in the Jevišovice Uplands. The highest point is the hill Kraví hora at 478 m (1,568 ft) above sea level. The southwestern municipal border is formed by the Vranov Reservoir, built on the Thaya River.

== History ==
The first written mention of Štítary is from 1346, when King Charles IV promoted the settlement to a market town. It belonged to the Vranov estate. During the Thirty Years' War, the market town was badly damaged and it took several decades to recover. Another disaster was a fire in 1706. From 1680 to 1787, the estate was owned by the Althan family. From 1790, the Mníšek family ruled the estate. After the abolition of serfdom in 1787, Štítary became a developed trade centre.

== Demographics ==
Historical population

Year	Pop.	±%
1869	1,055	—
1880	1,116	+5.8%
1890	1,129	+1.2%
1900	1,076	−4.7%
1910	1,040	−3.3%

Year	Pop.	±%
1921	1,068	+2.7%
1930	1,153	+8.0%
1950	891	−22.7%
1961	897	+0.7%
1970	817	−8.9%

Year	Pop.	±%
1980	712	−12.9%
1991	605	−15.0%
2001	677	+11.9%
2011	663	−2.1%
2021	581	−12.4%

Source: Censuses

== Transport ==
The railway line Znojmo–Okříšky passes through the eastern part of the municipal territory, but there is no train station. The market town is served by the station in neighbouring Šumná.

== Sights ==
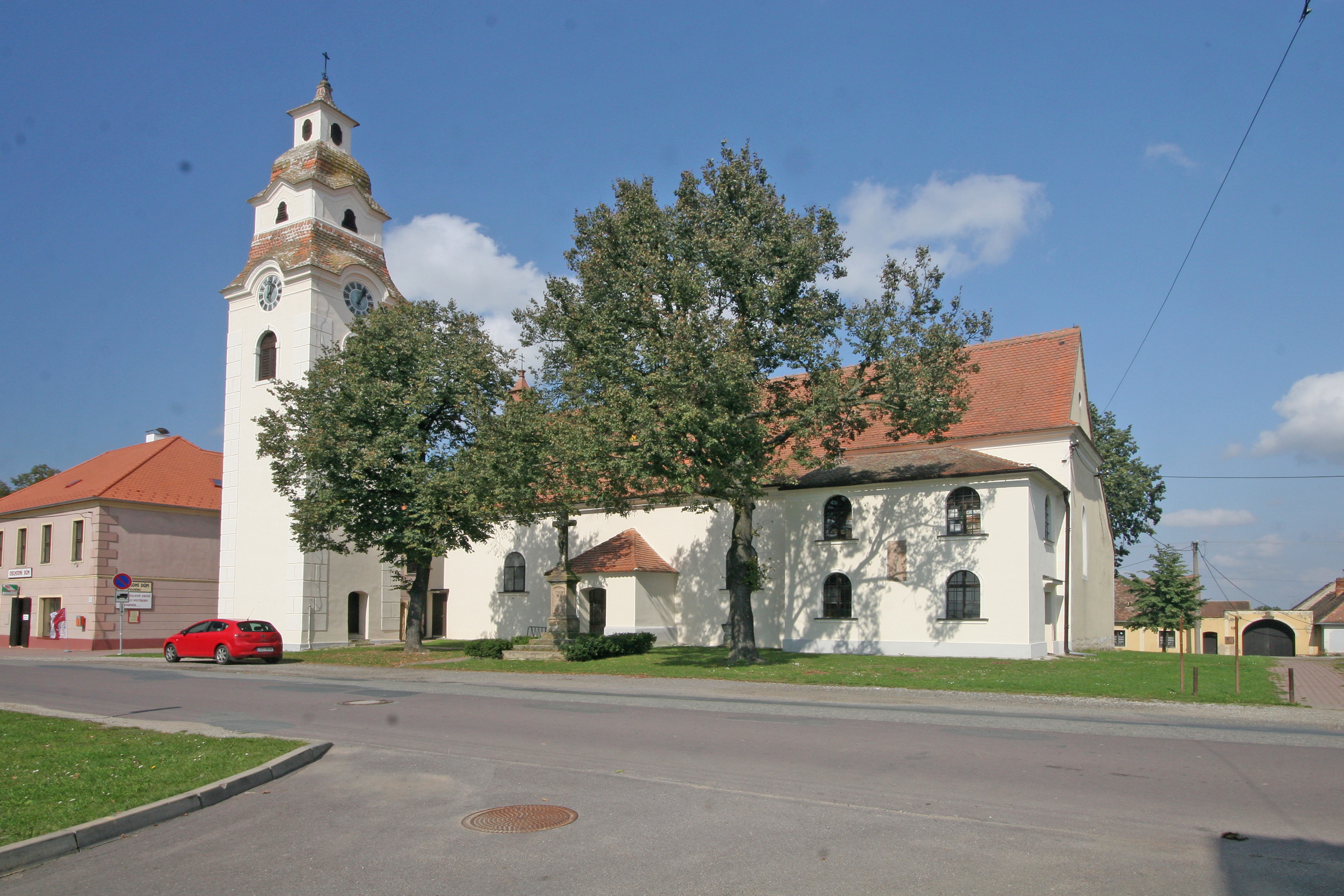
Church of Saint George

The main landmark of Štítary is the Church of Saint George. It has a late Romanesque core from the end of the 13th century, but its present appearance is the result of later alterations and extensions. Next to the church is a separate bell tower.
