= Radostín nad Oslavou =

- Market town
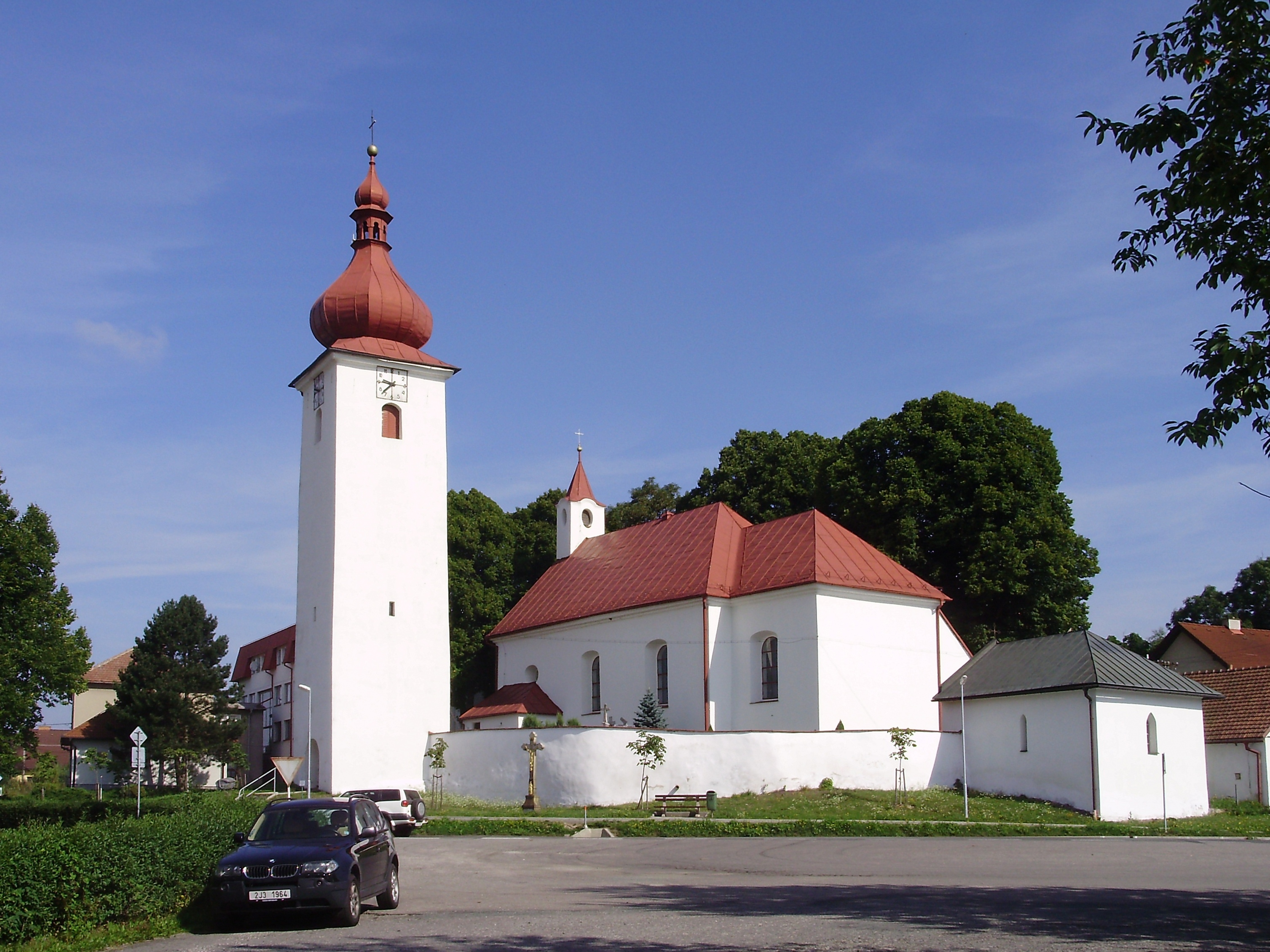
- Church of Saint Bartholomew

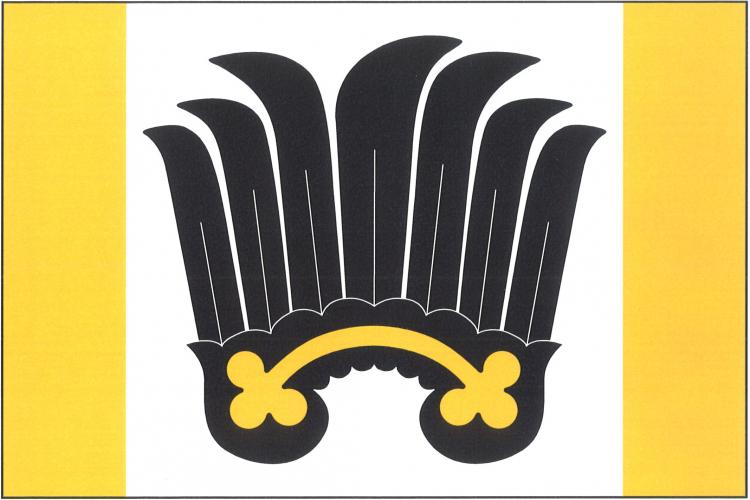
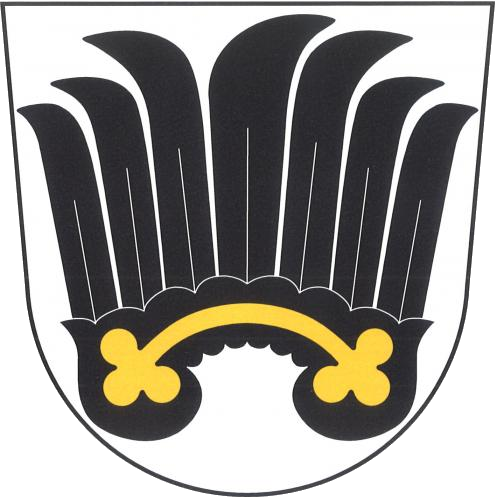
- Flag Coat of arms

- Location in the Czech Republic
- Coordinates: 49°27′43″N 15°57′55″E
- Country: Czech Republic
- Region: Vysočina
- District: Žďár nad Sázavou
- First mentioned: 1390

Area
  - Total: 15.48 km^{2} (5.98 sq mi)
- Elevation: 526 m (1,726 ft)

Population (2026-01-01)
  - Total: 945
  - Density: 61.0/km^{2} (158/sq mi)
- Time zone: UTC+1 (CET)
  - Summer (DST): UTC+2 (CEST)
- Postal code: 594 44
- Website: www.radostinnadoslavou.cz

Radostín nad Oslavou (Czech pronunciation: [ˈradosciːn ˈnat oslavou]) is a market town in Žďár nad Sázavou District in the Vysočina Region of the Czech Republic. It has about 900 inhabitants.

== Administrative division ==
Radostín nad Oslavou consists of two municipal parts (in brackets population according to the 2021 census):

- Radostín nad Oslavou (886)
- Zahradiště (28)

== Geography ==
Radostín nad Oslavou is located about 11 kilometres (7 mi) south of Žďár nad Sázavou and 28 km (17 mi) east of Jihlava. It lies in the Křižanov Highlands. The highest point is at 618 m (2,028 ft) above sea level. The market town is situated on the right bank of the Oslava River.

== History ==
The first written mention of Radostín nad Oslavou is from 1365, when it was already a market town. The village of Zahraditě was first mentioned in 1351. Among the most notable owners of Radostín were the Pernštejn family and Liechtenstein family.

== Demographics ==
Historical population

Year	Pop.	±%
1869	828	—
1880	761	−8.1%
1890	736	−3.3%
1900	719	−2.3%
1910	713	−0.8%

Year	Pop.	±%
1921	689	−3.4%
1930	633	−8.1%
1950	650	+2.7%
1961	735	+13.1%
1970	773	+5.2%

Year	Pop.	±%
1980	820	+6.1%
1991	773	−5.7%
2001	862	+11.5%
2011	907	+5.2%
2021	914	+0.8%

Source: Censuses

== Transport ==
There are no railways or major roads passing through the municipality.

== Sights ==
The main landmark is the Church of Saint Bartholomew. It was built in the late Baroque style in the second half of the 18th century, but it has a Gothic core.
