= Vratěnín =

- Market town
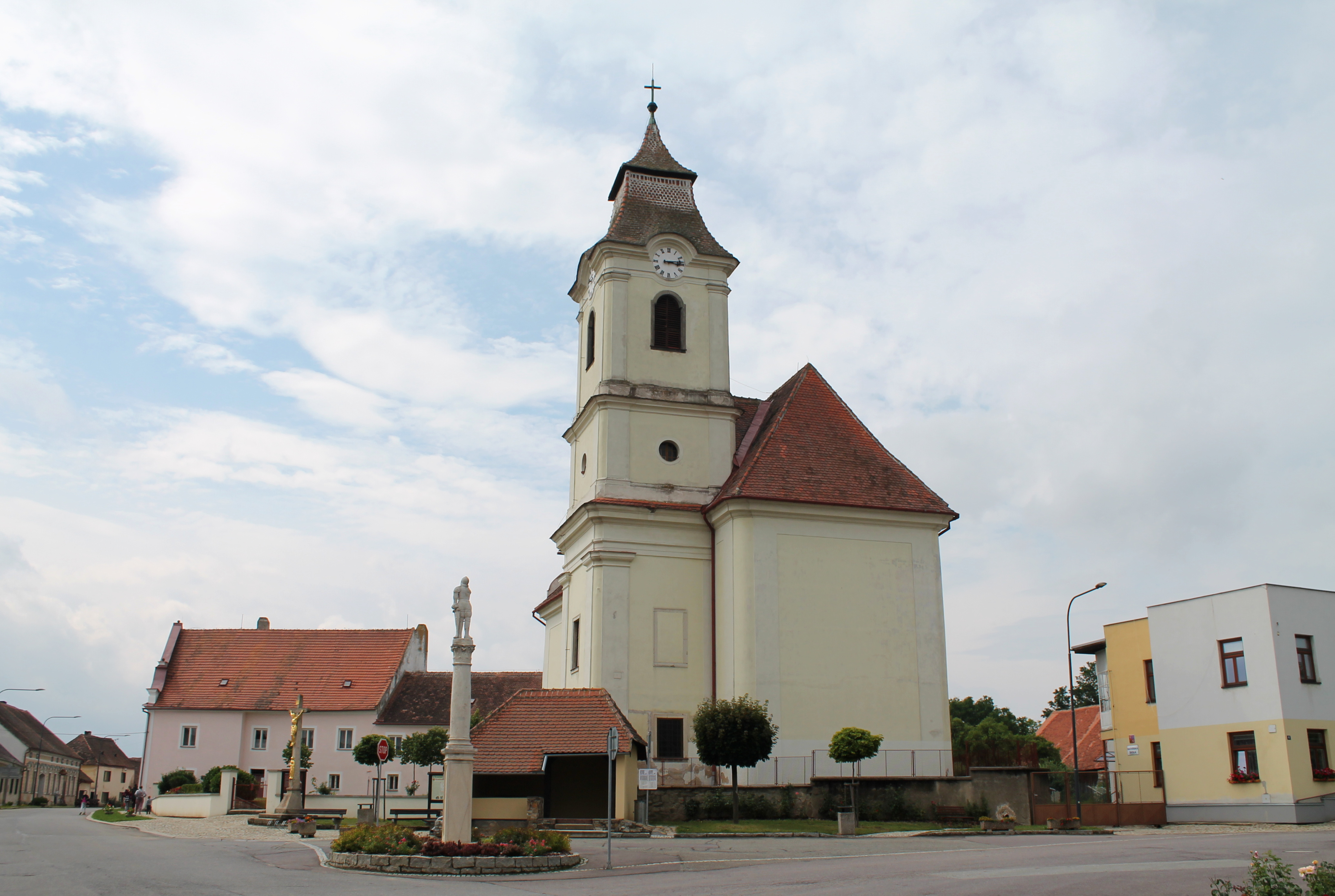
- Church of Saint James the Great

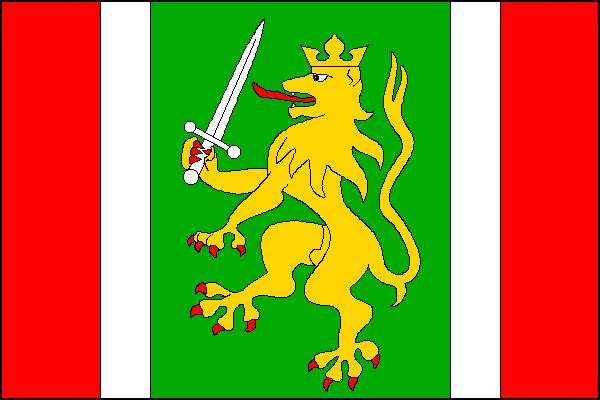
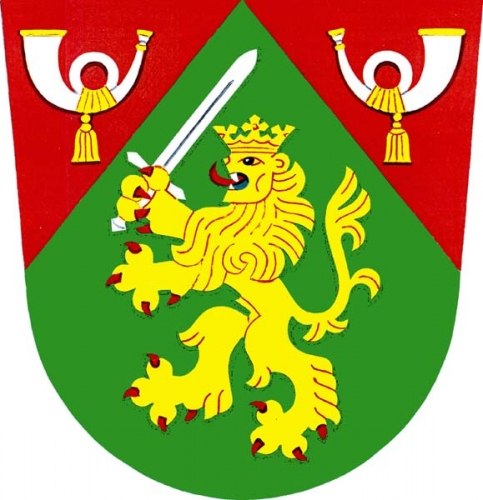
- Flag Coat of arms

- Location in the Czech Republic
- Coordinates: 48°54′15″N 15°35′43″E
- Country: Czech Republic
- Region: South Moravian
- District: Znojmo
- First mentioned: 1251

Area
  - Total: 14.73 km^{2} (5.69 sq mi)
- Elevation: 468 m (1,535 ft)

Population (2026-01-01)
  - Total: 270
  - Density: 18/km^{2} (47/sq mi)
- Time zone: UTC+1 (CET)
  - Summer (DST): UTC+2 (CEST)
- Postal code: 671 07
- Website: www.vratenin.cz

Vratěnín (Czech pronunciation: [ˈvracɛɲiːn]) is a market town in Znojmo District in the South Moravian Region of the Czech Republic. It has about 300 inhabitants.

== Geography ==
Vratěnín is located about 33 kilometres (21 mi) west of Znojmo and 79 km (49 mi) southwest of Brno. It lies in the Jevišovice Uplands. The highest point is the hill Šibeník at 517 m (1,696 ft) above sea level. The stream Vratěnínský potok flows through the market town. There are two fishponds in the municipal territory: Vratěnínský rybník and Karáskův rybník.

== History ==
The first written mention of Vratěnín is from 1251. It was located on an old trade route from Prague to Vienna. In 1325, Vratěnín was promoted to a market town by King John of Bohemia. From 1423 to 1564, the market town was ruled by the Krajíř of Krajek noble family. In 1526–1532 the first postal connection between Prague and Vienna led through the market town. A large post office was built here in 1700 and today the building serves as the municipal office.

In the 17th century, Vratěnín was owned by the Berchtold family, who founded here a monastery. The monastery was built in 1719–1730, but already in 1784 it was abolished. During the reign of Maria Theresa (between 1740 and 1780), a new postal route was established and the importance of Vratěnín decreased.

== Demographics ==
Historical population

Year	Pop.	±%
1869	551	—
1880	522	−5.3%
1890	536	+2.7%
1900	528	−1.5%
1910	487	−7.8%

Year	Pop.	±%
1921	528	+8.4%
1930	529	+0.2%
1950	426	−19.5%
1961	342	−19.7%
1970	330	−3.5%

Year	Pop.	±%
1980	320	−3.0%
1991	307	−4.1%
2001	293	−4.6%
2011	288	−1.7%
2021	272	−5.6%

Source: Censuses

== Transport ==
The road border crossing Vratěnín / Oberthürnau with Austria is located here. There are no railways or major roads passing through the municipal territory.

== Sights ==
The main landmark of Vratěnín is the Church of Saint James the Great. It was built in the late Baroque style in 1771–1773.
