= Běhařovice =

- Market town
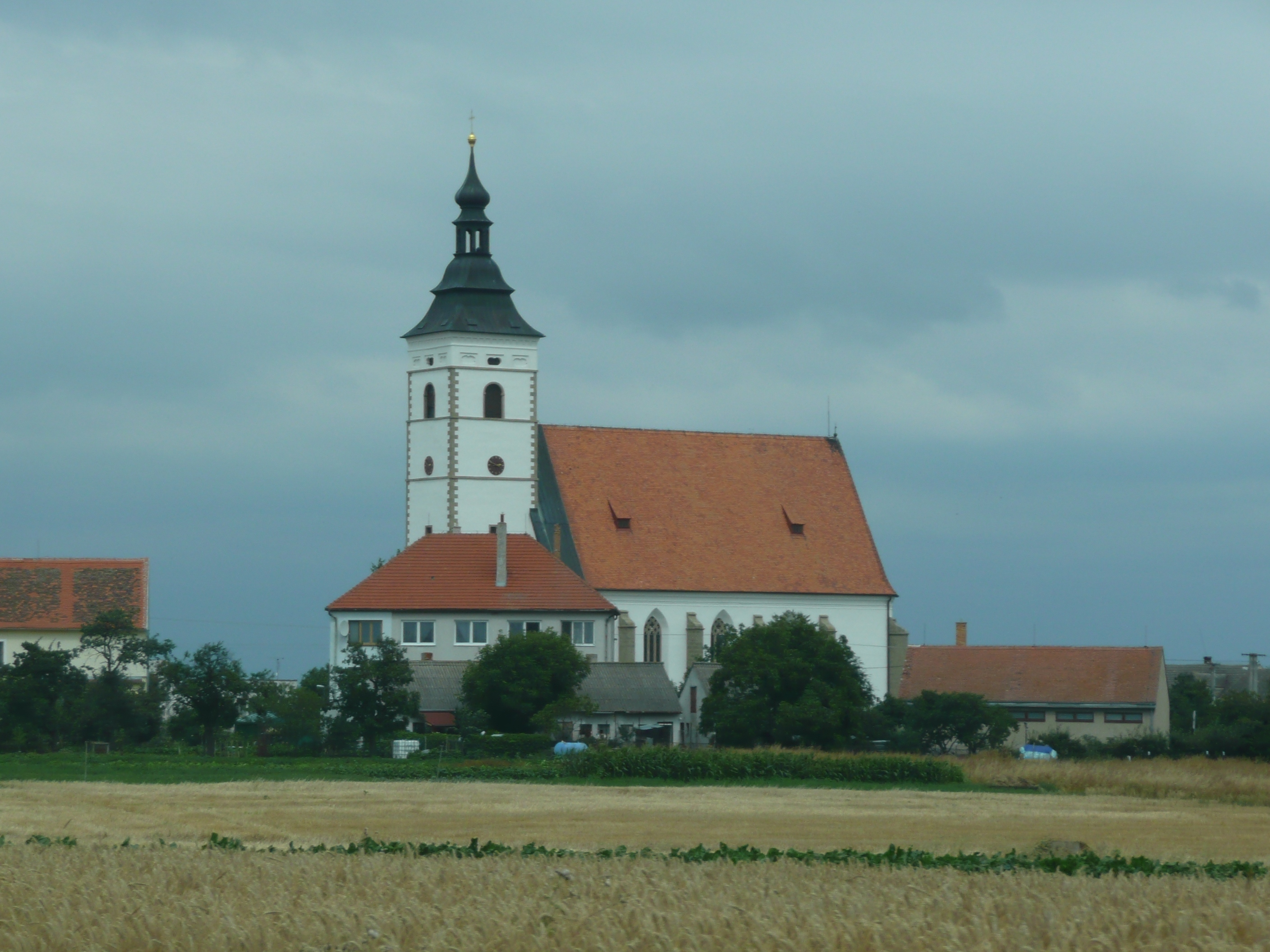
- Church of the Holy Trinity

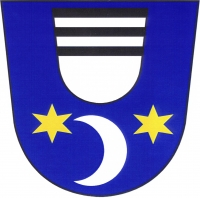
- Flag Coat of arms

- Location in the Czech Republic
- Coordinates: 49°0′14″N 16°4′43″E
- Country: Czech Republic
- Region: South Moravian
- District: Znojmo
- First mentioned: 1046

Area
  - Total: 14.03 km^{2} (5.42 sq mi)
- Elevation: 381 m (1,250 ft)

Population (2026-01-01)
  - Total: 369
  - Density: 26.3/km^{2} (68.1/sq mi)
- Time zone: UTC+1 (CET)
  - Summer (DST): UTC+2 (CEST)
- Postal codes: 671 39, 671 40
- Website: www.obec-beharovice.cz

Běhařovice (Czech pronunciation: [ˈbjɛɦar̝ovɪtsɛ]) is a market town in Znojmo District in the South Moravian Region of the Czech Republic. It has about 400 inhabitants.

== Administrative division ==
Běhařovice consists of three municipal parts (in brackets population according to the 2021 census):

- Běhařovice (173)
- Ratišovice (82)
- Stupešice (101)

== Geography ==
Běhařovice is located about 16 kilometres (10 mi) north of Znojmo and 43 km (27 mi) southwest of Brno. It lies in the Jevišovice Uplands. The highest point is at 410 m (1,345 ft) above sea level.

== History ==
The first written mention of Běhařovice is in a hoax from the 12th century, which mentions the year 1046. Between 1528 and 1548, Běhařovice was promoted to a market town.

== Demographics ==
Historical population

Year	Pop.	±%
1869	847	—
1880	865	+2.1%
1890	939	+8.6%
1900	946	+0.7%
1910	935	−1.2%

Year	Pop.	±%
1921	935	+0.0%
1930	932	−0.3%
1950	764	−18.0%
1961	757	−0.9%
1970	630	−16.8%

Year	Pop.	±%
1980	512	−18.7%
1991	465	−9.2%
2001	425	−8.6%
2011	374	−12.0%
2021	356	−4.8%

Source: Censuses

== Transport ==
There are no railways or major roads passing through the municipality.

== Sights ==
The main landmark of Běhařovice is the Church of the Holy Trinity. It was built in the Renaissance style with Gothic elements in 1593–1596. In 1884, it was modified significantly and the tower was lowered.
