= Višňové (Znojmo District) =

- Market town
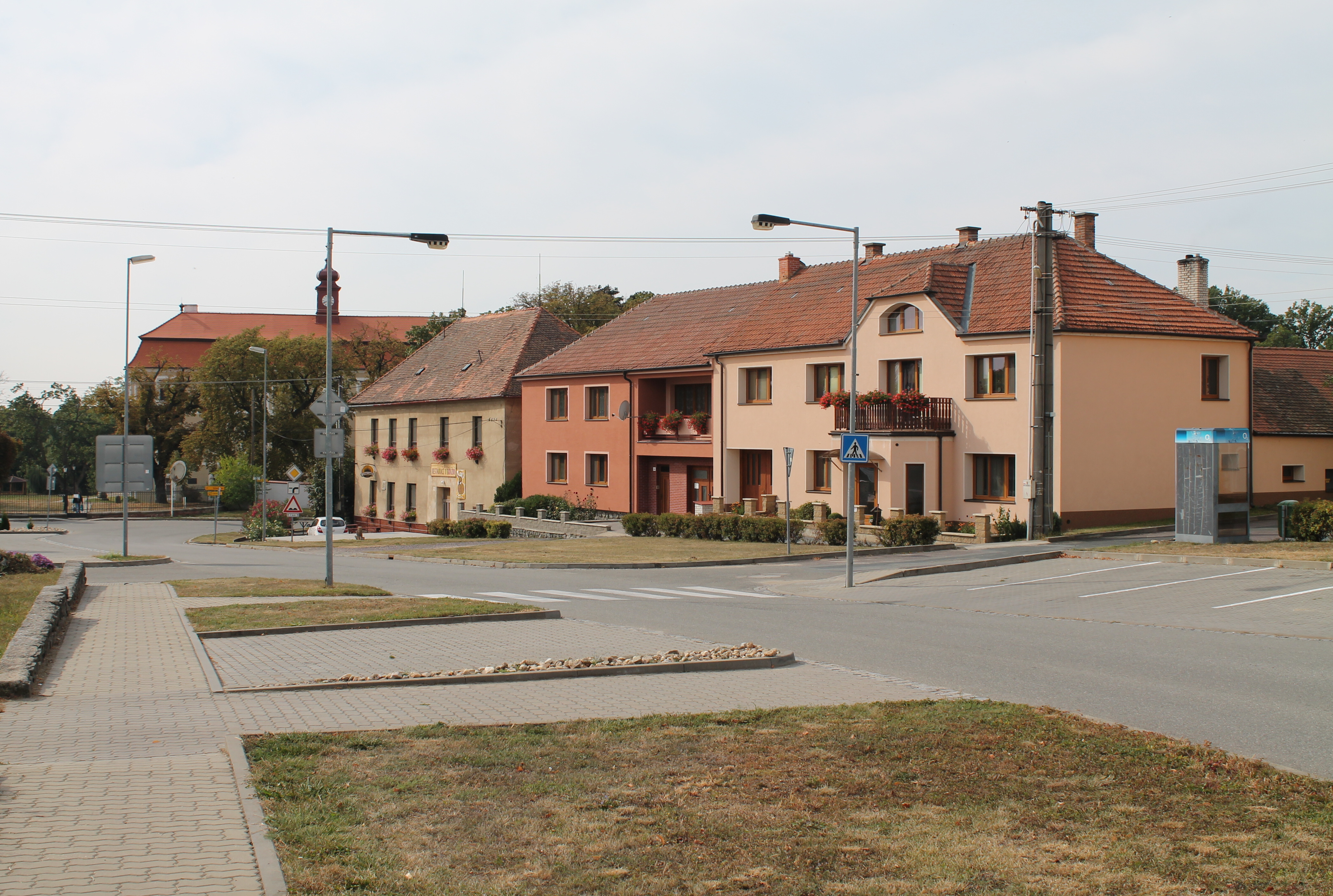
- Centre of Višňové

- Flag Coat of arms

- Location in the Czech Republic
- Coordinates: 48°58′57″N 16°9′0″E
- Country: Czech Republic
- Region: South Moravian
- District: Znojmo
- First mentioned: 1234

Area
  - Total: 15.27 km^{2} (5.90 sq mi)
- Elevation: 338 m (1,109 ft)

Population (2026-01-01)
  - Total: 1,077
  - Density: 70.53/km^{2} (182.7/sq mi)
- Time zone: UTC+1 (CET)
  - Summer (DST): UTC+2 (CEST)
- Postal code: 671 38
- Website: www.visnove.cz

Višňové (Czech pronunciation: [ˈvɪʃɲovɛː]; German: Wischenau) is a market town in Znojmo District in the South Moravian Region of the Czech Republic. It has about 1,100 inhabitants.

== Geography ==
Višňové is located about 15 kilometres (9 mi) northeast of Znojmo and 39 km (24 mi) southwest of Brno. It lies in the Jevišovice Uplands. The highest point is at 388 m (1,273 ft) above sea level. The market town is situated on the right bank of the Rokytná River. Horní Dunajovice Reservoir, built on the Křepička Stream, is situated on the southern municipal border.

== History ==
The first written mention of Višňové is from 1234. Until 1435, the owners of the village often changed. From 1435 to 1583, it was a property of the Višňovský of Petrovec noble family. During their rule, in 1529, Višňové was promoted to a market town. In 1583–1629, the market town was owned by the Zahrádecký of Zahrádky family. The Thirty Years' War left Višňové badly damaged and depopulated. In 1629–1667, Višňové was owned by the Elbogner family; then the owners again often changed. From the 1790s, Višňové was ruled by the Counts of Taaffe.

== Demographics ==
Historical population

Year	Pop.	±%
1869	717	—
1880	834	+16.3%
1890	871	+4.4%
1900	884	+1.5%
1910	993	+12.3%

Year	Pop.	±%
1921	1,083	+9.1%
1930	1,097	+1.3%
1950	1,003	−8.6%
1961	1,069	+6.6%
1970	1,023	−4.3%

Year	Pop.	±%
1980	1,031	+0.8%
1991	1,080	+4.8%
2001	1,107	+2.5%
2011	1,083	−2.2%
2021	1,076	−0.6%

Source: Censuses

== Transport ==
There are no railways or major roads passing through the municipality.

== Sights ==
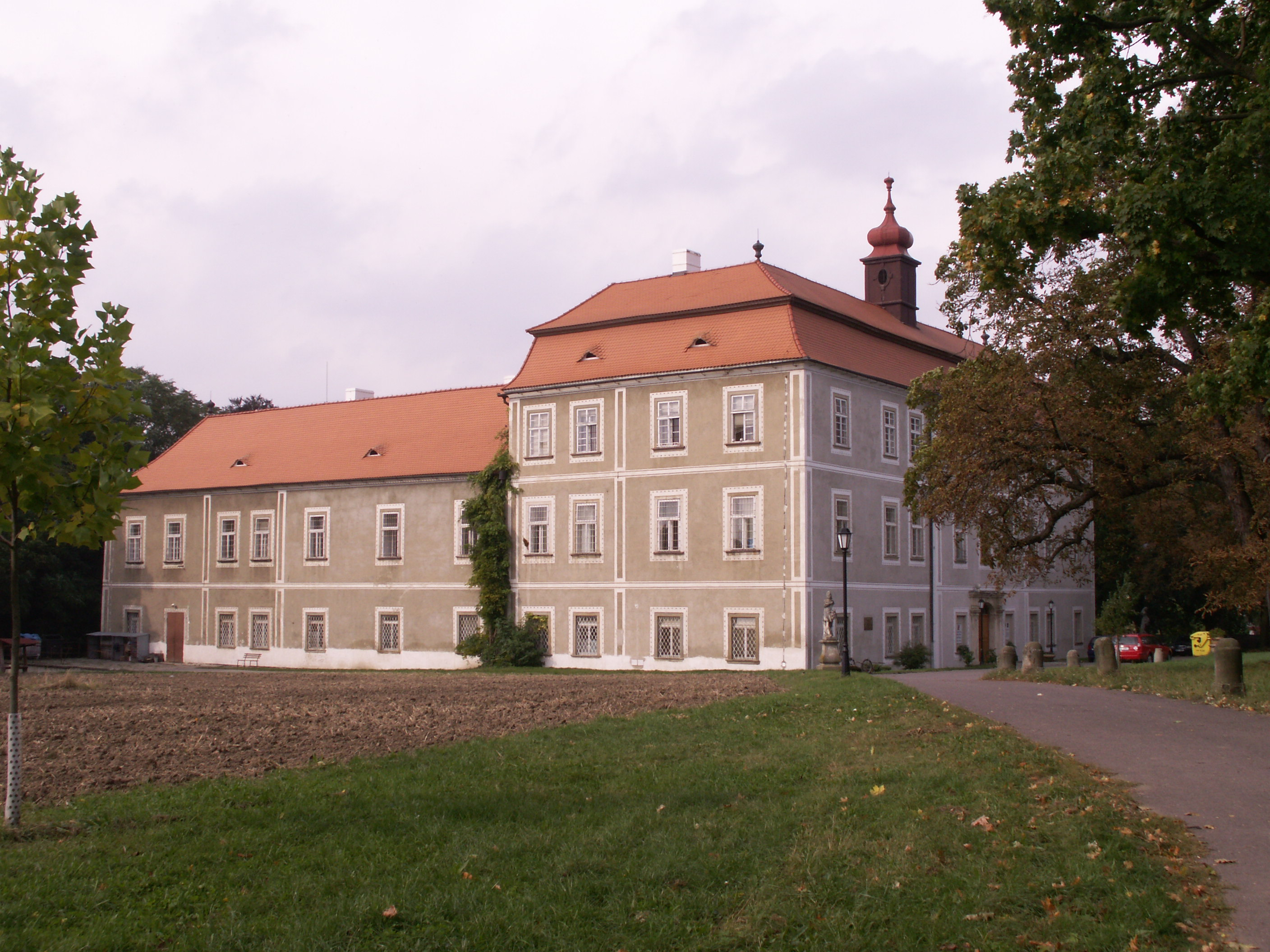
Višňové Castle

Among the main landmarks of Višňové is the castle and the church. The Višňové Castle was built in the mid-16th century on the site of an older fortress. In 1779, it was modified in the Baroque style. Today there is an educational institute for youth. The castle is surrounded by a park.

The Church of Saint John the Baptist has a complicated construction history. It has a Gothic core from the second half of the 13th century. The church was then rebuilt at the beginning of the 16th century, in 1696, and lastly in the years 1896–1901.
