= Zdislavice =

- Market town
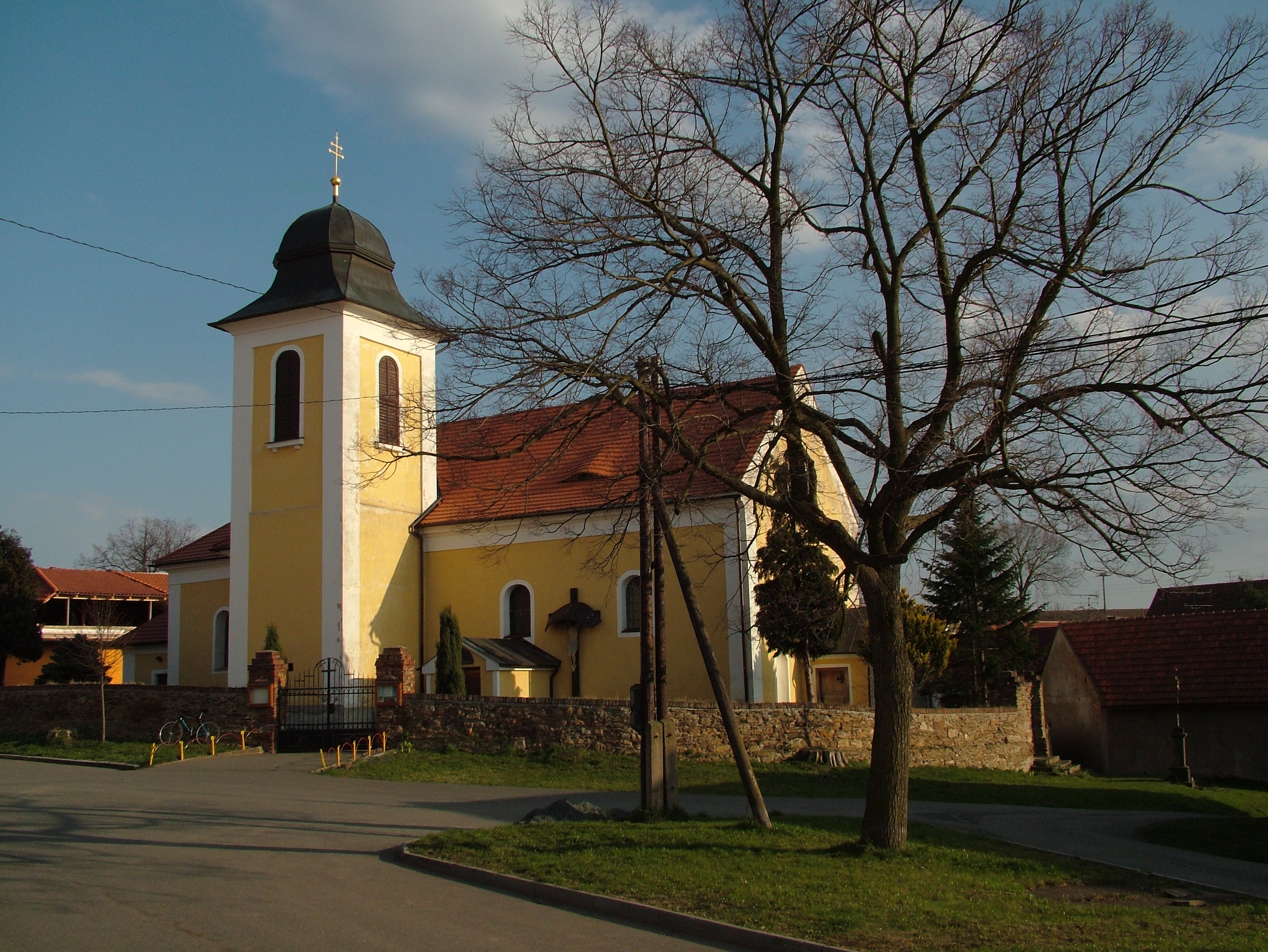
- Church of Saints Peter and Paul

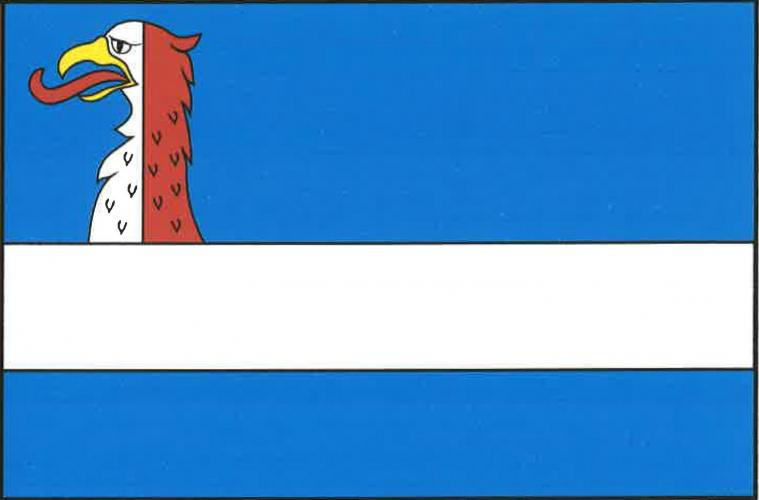
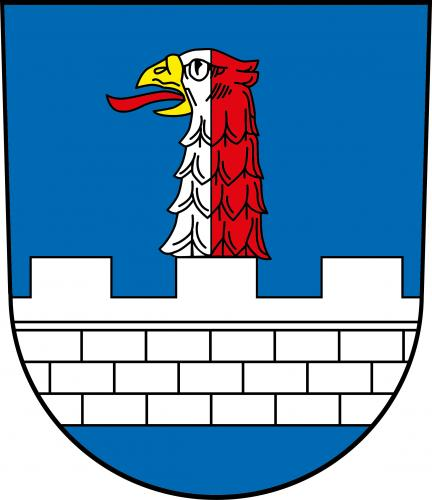
- Flag Coat of arms

- Location in the Czech Republic
- Coordinates: 49°41′12″N 14°58′28″E
- Country: Czech Republic
- Region: Central Bohemian
- District: Benešov
- First mentioned: 1352

Area
  - Total: 6.77 km^{2} (2.61 sq mi)
- Elevation: 312 m (1,024 ft)

Population (2026-01-01)
  - Total: 517
  - Density: 76.4/km^{2} (198/sq mi)
- Time zone: UTC+1 (CET)
  - Summer (DST): UTC+2 (CEST)
- Postal code: 257 64
- Website: www.zdislavice.cz

Zdislavice (Czech pronunciation: [ˈzɟɪslavɪtsɛ]) is a market town in Benešov District in the Central Bohemian Region of the Czech Republic. It has about 500 inhabitants.

== Etymology ==
The name is derived from the personal name Zdislav, meaning "the village of Zdislav's people".

== Geography ==
Zdislavice is located about 23 kilometres (14 mi) southeast of Benešov and 53 km (33 mi) southeast of Prague. It lies in the Vlašim Uplands. The highest point is at 495 m (1,624 ft) above sea level. The stream Štěpánovský potok flows through the market town.

== History ==
The first written mention of Zdislavice is from 1352. Until 1547, the village was part of the Vlašim estate and shared its owners. Knigh Petr of Újezd bought Zdislavice in 1547 and ruled the village for several years. After his rule, Zdislavice was bought by Václav Čejka of Olbramovice and became part of the Kácov estate. In this period, Zdislavice was promoted to a market town.

== Demographics ==
Historical population

Year	Pop.	±%
1869	716	—
1880	762	+6.4%
1890	700	−8.1%
1900	696	−0.6%
1910	710	+2.0%

Year	Pop.	±%
1921	687	−3.2%
1930	653	−4.9%
1950	580	−11.2%
1961	570	−1.7%
1970	539	−5.4%

Year	Pop.	±%
1980	538	−0.2%
1991	533	−0.9%
2001	529	−0.8%
2011	552	+4.3%
2021	514	−6.9%

Source: Censuses

== Transport ==
There are no major roads passing through the municipality. The railway that runs through Zdislavice is unused.

== Sights ==
The main landmark of Zdislavice is the Church of Saints Peter and Paul. The original church, first documented in 1355, was replaced by a new wooden church in 1645. However, this church was burned down in 1699. The current Baroque church was built in 1701–1702.

A unique monument is the small ossuary next to the church. It dates from the 18th century.
