= Bohdalov =

- Market town
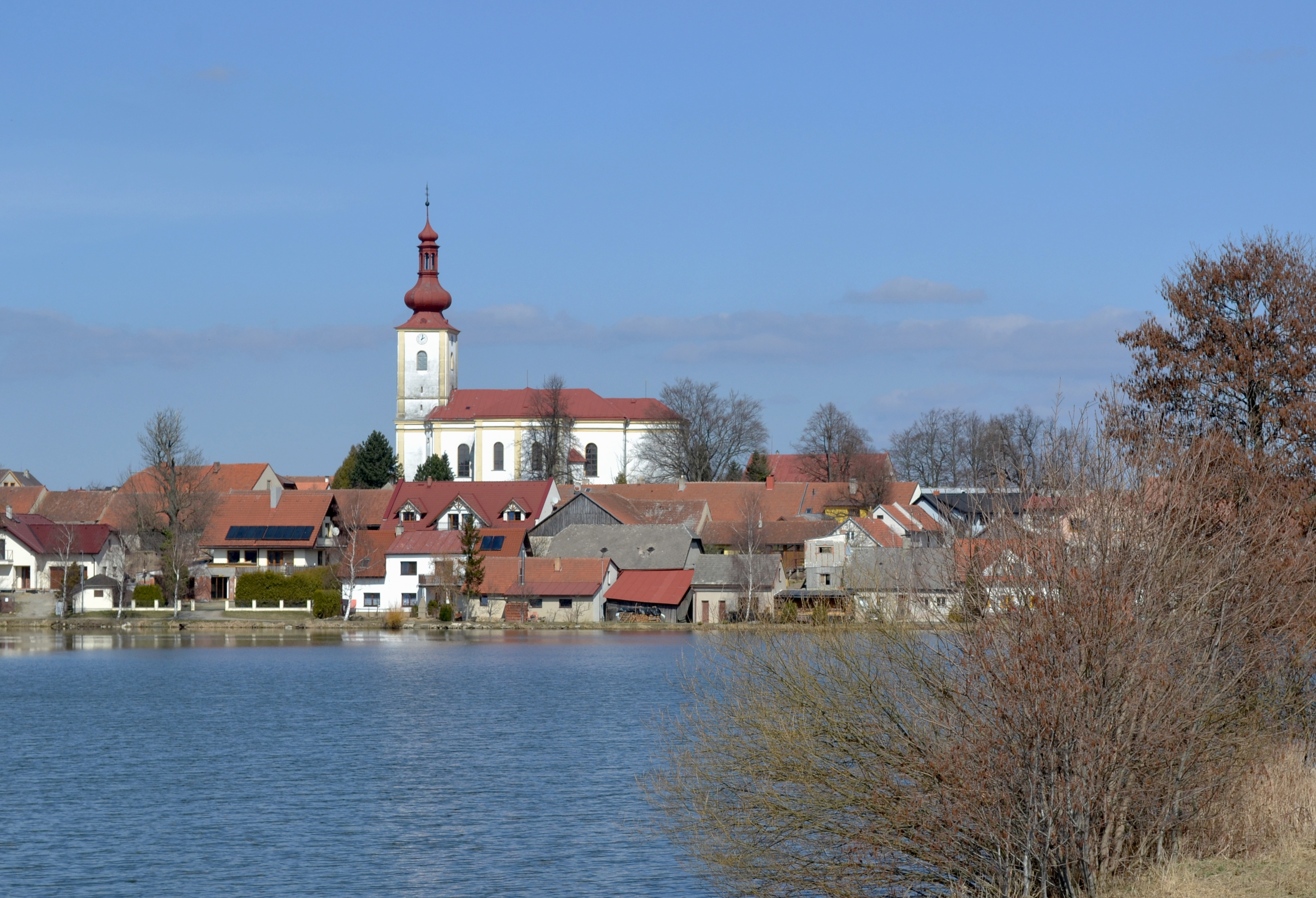
- View towards the Church of Saint Lawrence

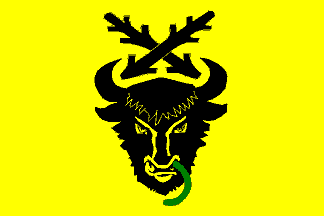
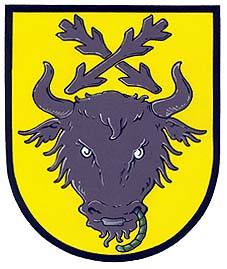
- Flag Coat of arms

- Location in the Czech Republic
- Coordinates: 49°28′45″N 15°52′33″E
- Country: Czech Republic
- Region: Vysočina
- District: Žďár nad Sázavou
- First mentioned: 1349

Area
  - Total: 16.06 km^{2} (6.20 sq mi)
- Elevation: 570 m (1,870 ft)

Population (2026-01-01)
  - Total: 1,180
  - Density: 73.5/km^{2} (190/sq mi)
- Time zone: UTC+1 (CET)
  - Summer (DST): UTC+2 (CEST)
- Postal code: 592 13
- Website: www.bohdalov.cz

Bohdalov (Czech pronunciation: [ˈboɦdalof]; German: Bochdalau) is a market town in Žďár nad Sázavou District in the Vysočina Region of the Czech Republic. It has about 1,200 inhabitants.

== Administrative division ==
Bohdalov consists of two municipal parts (in brackets population according to the 2021 census):

- Bohdalov (922)
- Chroustov (194)

== Geography ==
Bohdalov is located about 10 kilometres (6 mi) southwest of Žďár nad Sázavou and 22 km (14 mi) northeast of Jihlava. It lies in the Křižanov Highlands. The highest point is at 705 m (2,313 ft) above sea level. The stream of Bohdalovský potok flows through the market town. The territory is rich in fishponds.

== History ==
The first written mention of Bohdalov is from 1349, when it was already a market town. The settlement was probably founded in the first half of the 13th century.

== Demographics ==
Historical population

Year	Pop.	±%
1869	1,013	—
1880	1,191	+17.6%
1890	1,139	−4.4%
1900	1,123	−1.4%
1910	1,123	+0.0%

Year	Pop.	±%
1921	1,081	−3.7%
1930	963	−10.9%
1950	851	−11.6%
1961	935	+9.9%
1970	967	+3.4%

Year	Pop.	±%
1980	999	+3.3%
1991	1,062	+6.3%
2001	1,074	+1.1%
2011	1,130	+5.2%
2021	1,116	−1.2%

Source: Censuses

== Transport ==
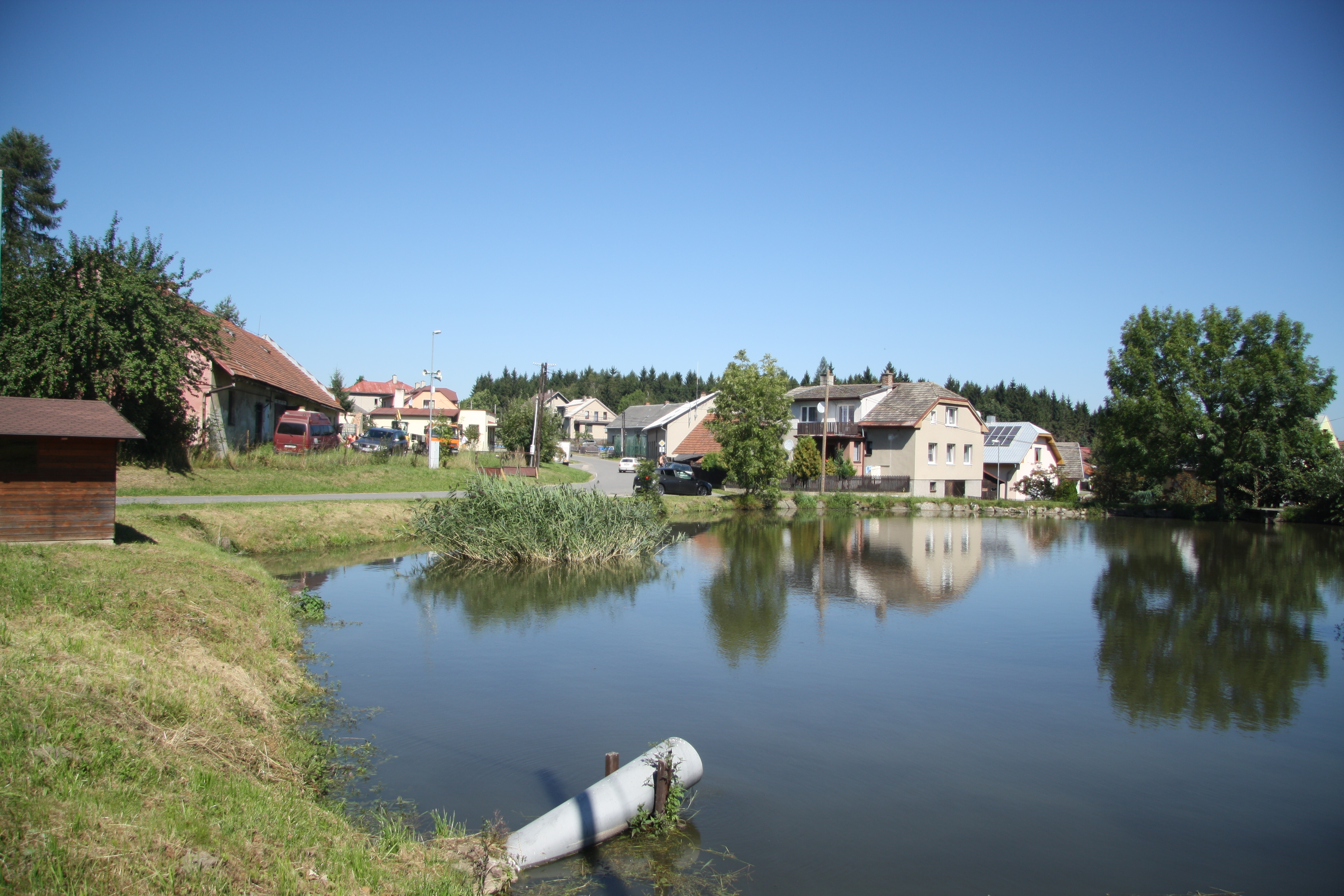
The village of Chroustov

There are no railways or major roads passing through the municipality.

== Sights ==
The main landmark of Bohdalov is the Church of Saint Lawrence. It was built in the late Baroque style in 1736–1758. It was built on the site of an old Gothic church, from which the former presbytery serving today as the sacristy was preserved.
