= Troskotovice =

- Market town
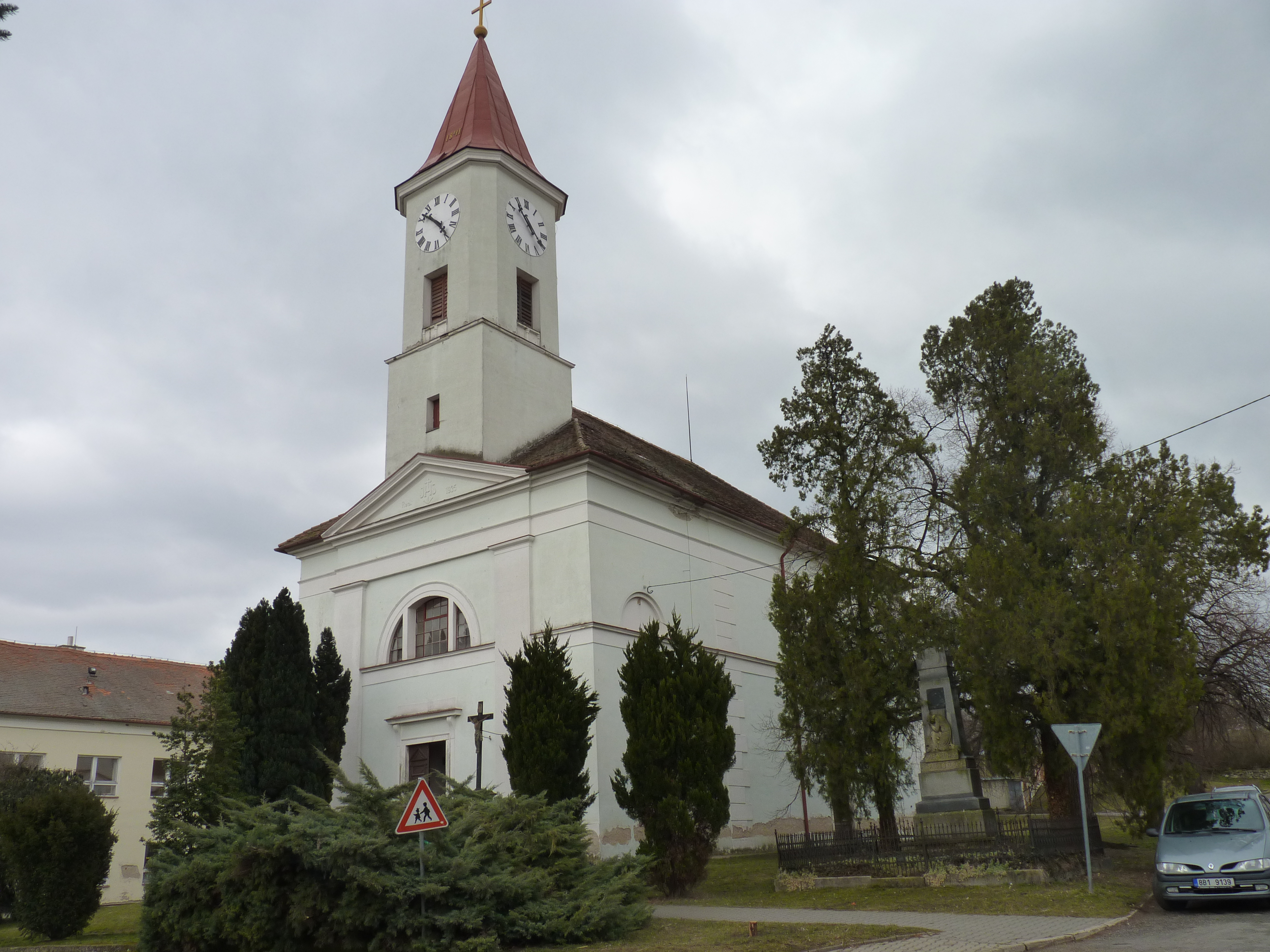
- Church of Saint Wenceslaus

- Location in the Czech Republic
- Coordinates: 48°55′9″N 16°26′15″E
- Country: Czech Republic
- Region: South Moravian
- District: Brno-Country
- First mentioned: 1046

Area
  - Total: 18.05 km^{2} (6.97 sq mi)
- Elevation: 193 m (633 ft)

Population (2026-01-01)
  - Total: 778
  - Density: 43.1/km^{2} (112/sq mi)
- Time zone: UTC+1 (CET)
  - Summer (DST): UTC+2 (CEST)
- Postal code: 671 78
- Website: www.troskotovice.cz

Troskotovice (Czech pronunciation: [ˈtroskotovɪtsɛ]; German: Treskowitz) is a market town in Brno-Country District in the South Moravian Region of the Czech Republic. It has about 800 inhabitants.

== Geography ==
Troskotovice is located about 32 kilometres (20 mi) south of Brno. It lies in the Dyje–Svratka Valley. The Miroslavka Stream flows through the market town. There are two fishponds built on the Miroslavka, called Horní troskotovický rybník and Dolní troskotovický rybník.

== History ==
The first written mention of Troskotovice is from 1046. In 1538, during the rule of the Lords of Kunštát, it was promoted to a market town.

Before World War II, Troskotovice had a German majority. After the war, the German-speaking population was expelled.

== Demographics ==
Historical population

Year	Pop.	±%
1869	1,076	—
1880	1,151	+7.0%
1890	1,131	−1.7%
1900	1,181	+4.4%
1910	1,253	+6.1%

Year	Pop.	±%
1921	1,227	−2.1%
1930	1,359	+10.8%
1950	780	−42.6%
1961	715	−8.3%
1970	665	−7.0%

Year	Pop.	±%
1980	587	−11.7%
1991	579	−1.4%
2001	573	−1.0%
2011	634	+10.6%
2021	654	+3.2%

Source: Censuses

== Transport ==
There are no railways or major roads passing through the market town.

== Sights ==
The main landmark of Troskotovice is the Church of Saint Wenceslaus. It was built in the late Neoclassical style in 1840.
