= Heraltice =

- Market town
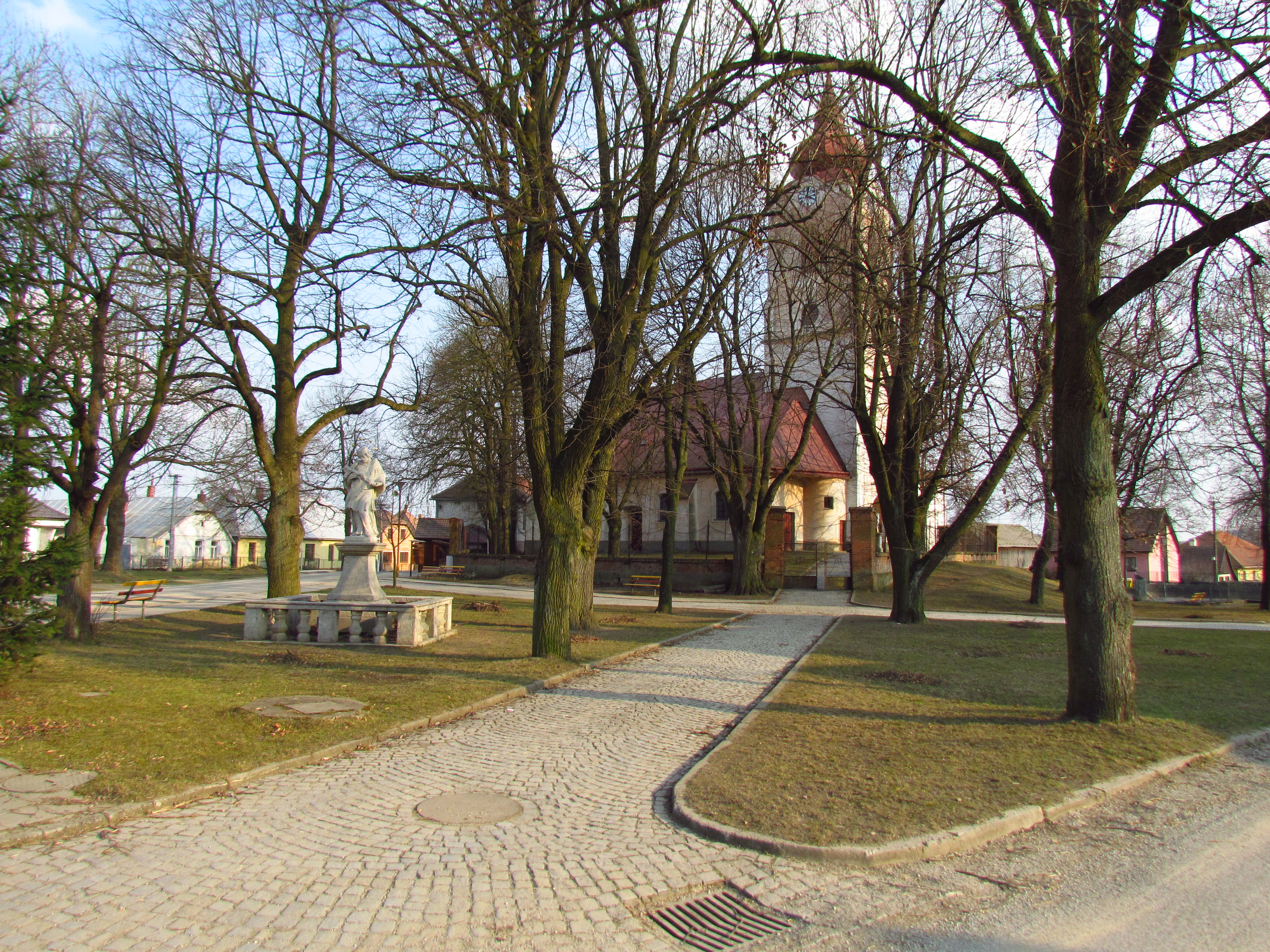
- Centre of Heraltice

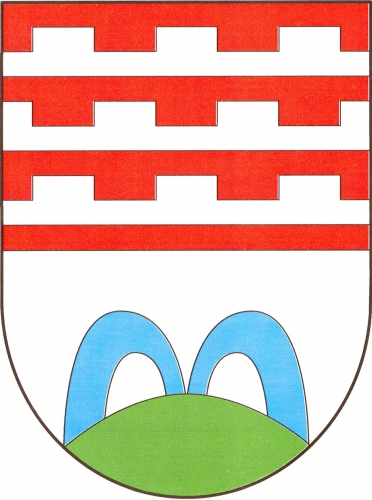
- Flag Coat of arms

- Location in the Czech Republic
- Coordinates: 49°13′51″N 15°43′50″E
- Country: Czech Republic
- Region: Vysočina
- District: Třebíč
- First mentioned: 1277

Area
  - Total: 7.02 km^{2} (2.71 sq mi)
- Elevation: 559 m (1,834 ft)

Population (2026-01-01)
  - Total: 383
  - Density: 54.6/km^{2} (141/sq mi)
- Time zone: UTC+1 (CET)
  - Summer (DST): UTC+2 (CEST)
- Postal code: 675 21
- Website: www.heraltice.cz

Heraltice (Czech pronunciation: [ˈɦɛralcɪtsɛ]) is a market town in Třebíč District in the Vysočina Region of the Czech Republic. It has about 400 inhabitants.

== Geography ==
Heraltice is located about 10 kilometres (6 mi) west of Třebíč and 21 km (13 mi) southeast of Jihlava. It lies mostly in the Křižanov Highlands, only the southeastern part of the municipal territory extends into the Jevišovice Uplands. The highest point is the hill Kobylí kopec at 671 m (2,201 ft) above sea level.

== History ==
The first written mention of Heraltice is from 1256. It was founded at the turn of the 12th and 13th centuries as a market village on the Prague–Vienna trade route. Soon it became a market town, but in 1468, it was looted and burned down by the army of Matthias Corvinus and became only a village. Even so, the village remained an economic and cultural centre. There was a fortress here, but it was dismantled after 1790.

== Demographics ==
Historical population

| Year | Pop. | ±% |
|---|---|---|
| 1869 | 534 | — |
| 1880 | 533 | −0.2% |
| 1890 | 481 | −9.8% |
| 1900 | 475 | −1.2% |
| 1910 | 487 | +2.5% |

| Year | Pop. | ±% |
|---|---|---|
| 1921 | 523 | +7.4% |
| 1930 | 520 | −0.6% |
| 1950 | 470 | −9.6% |
| 1961 | 509 | +8.3% |
| 1970 | 479 | −5.9% |

| Year | Pop. | ±% |
|---|---|---|
| 1980 | 431 | −10.0% |
| 1991 | 377 | −12.5% |
| 2001 | 376 | −0.3% |
| 2011 | 360 | −4.3% |
| 2021 | 343 | −4.7% |

Source: Censuses

== Transport ==
There are no railways or major roads passing through the municipality.

== Sights ==
The main landmark is the Church of Saint Giles. It is originally a Gothic church, rebuilt in 1716 in the Baroque style.

A notable historical building is the large rectory. It was built in the early Neoclassical style in 1790.
