= Chýně =

- Town
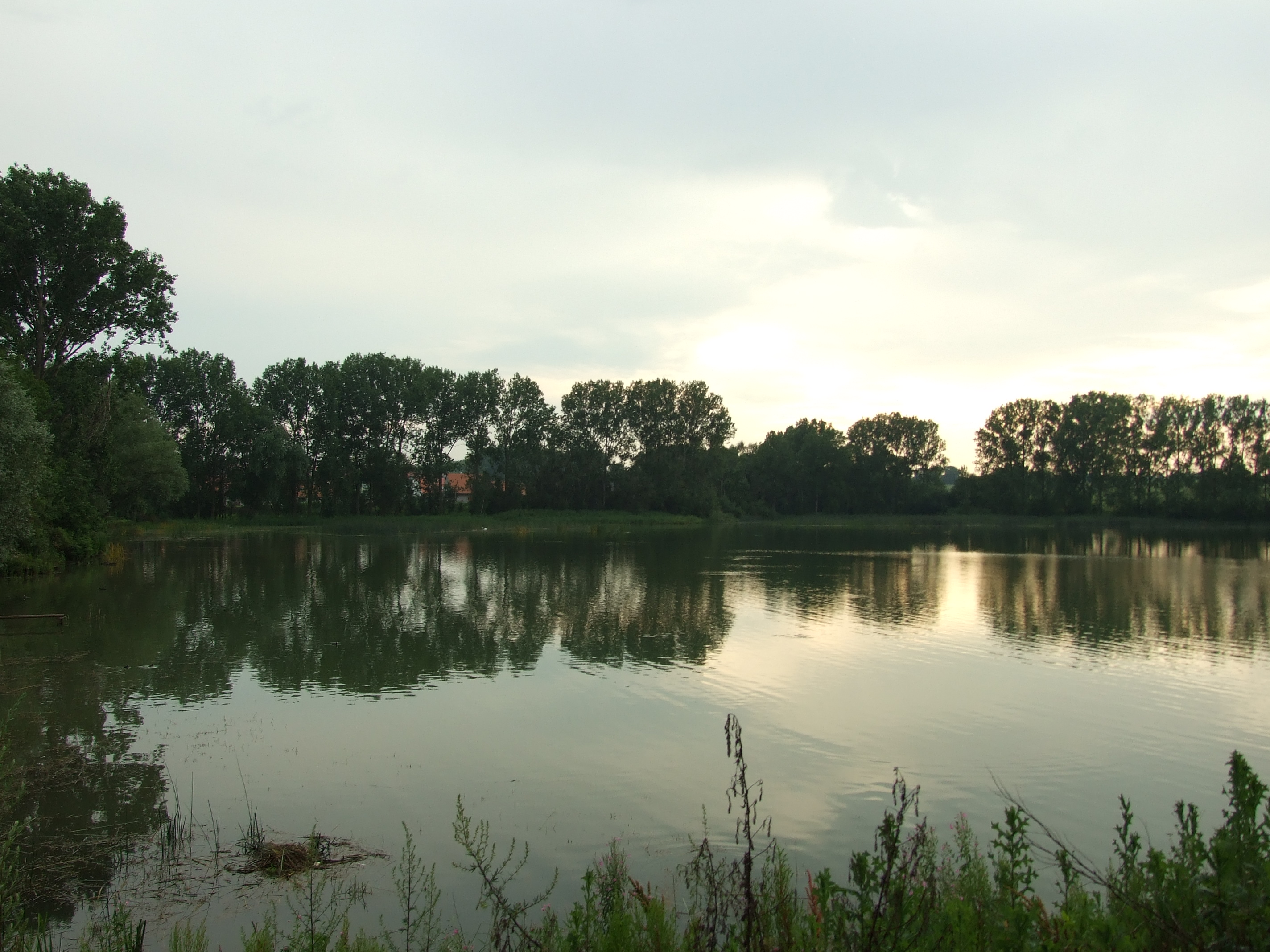
- The fishpond Bašta

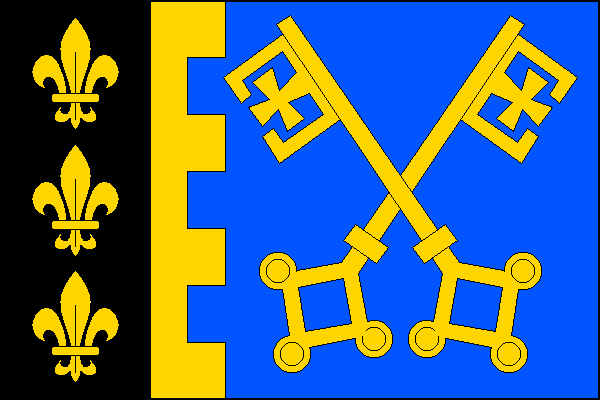
- Flag Coat of arms

- Location in the Czech Republic
- Coordinates: 50°3′39″N 14°13′37″E
- Country: Czech Republic
- Region: Central Bohemian
- District: Prague-West
- First mentioned: 1273

Government
  - Mayor: Anna Chvojková

Area
  - Total: 5.00 km^{2} (1.93 sq mi)
- Elevation: 370 m (1,210 ft)

Population (2026-01-01)
  - Total: 5,168
  - Density: 1,030/km^{2} (2,680/sq mi)
- Time zone: UTC+1 (CET)
  - Summer (DST): UTC+2 (CEST)
- Postal code: 253 03
- Website: www.chyne.cz

Chýně (Czech pronunciation: [ˈxiːɲɛ]) is a town in Prague-West District in the Central Bohemian Region of the Czech Republic. It has about 5,200 inhabitants. The town is located in the Prague Plateau. Chýně is among the fastest-growing Czech municipalities in the 21st century and was promoted to a town only in 2023.

== Etymology ==
The initial name of the settlement was probably Chajín. The name was derived from the personal name Chája, meaning "Chája's (court)". The name was gradually distorted to Chajn and then to Chejn. From the 19th century, the name Chýně is used.

== Geography ==
Chýně is located about 5 kilometres (3 mi) west of Prague. It lies in an agricultural landscape in the Prague Plateau.

The stream Litovický potok runs east along the northern border and supplies two small fishponds. The upper pond is called Bašta and is used for recreational purposes. The lower pond is called Strahovský rybník.

== History ==
The area of the town has been inhabited since prehistoric times. Iron furnaces that were found here are the oldest examples known in Bohemia and Moravia. The first written mention of Chýně is from 1273.

The village used to belong to Strahov Monastery and until recently it was a small farming community. Proximity to Prague, the airport, and the motorway to Plzeň led in the 1990s to the development of some logistics and construction industries. The municipality has grown considerably with some large housing developments to the west, and it is losing some of its rural character. In 2023, Chýně was promoted to a town.

== Demographics ==
Chýně is among the fastest-growing municipalities in the Czech Republic in the 21st century.

Historical population

| Year | Pop. | ±% |
|---|---|---|
| 1869 | 367 | — |
| 1880 | 436 | +18.8% |
| 1890 | 453 | +3.9% |
| 1900 | 521 | +15.0% |
| 1910 | 568 | +9.0% |

| Year | Pop. | ±% |
|---|---|---|
| 1921 | 567 | −0.2% |
| 1930 | 667 | +17.6% |
| 1950 | 624 | −6.4% |
| 1961 | 627 | +0.5% |
| 1970 | 608 | −3.0% |

| Year | Pop. | ±% |
|---|---|---|
| 1980 | 600 | −1.3% |
| 1991 | 545 | −9.2% |
| 2001 | 637 | +16.9% |
| 2011 | 2,006 | +214.9% |
| 2021 | 4,681 | +133.3% |

Source: Censuses

== Economy ==
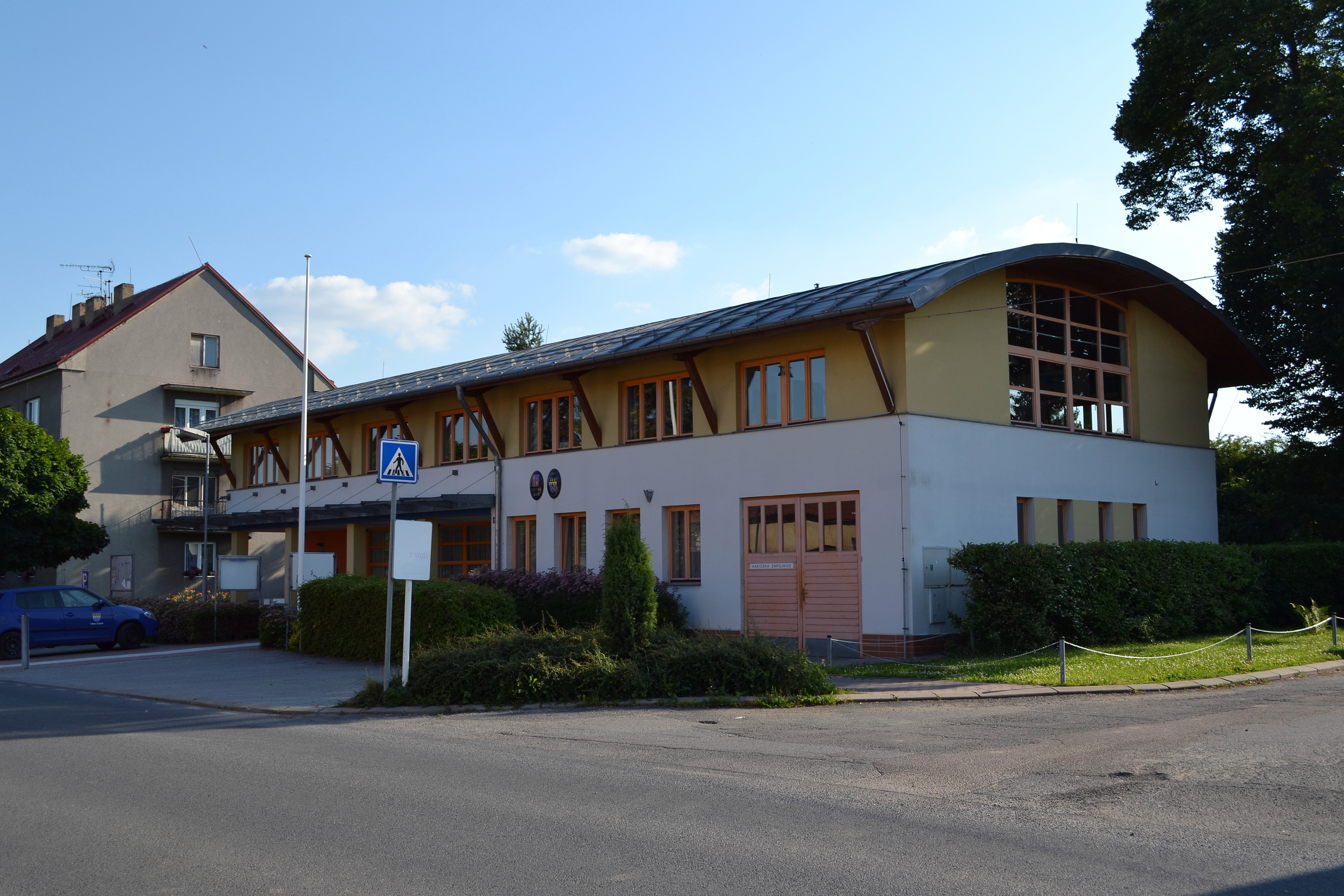
Town hall

Chýně has a small industrial area in the east.

== Transport ==
Chýně is located on the railway line Prague–Rudná. In addition to the Chýně train station, the town is served by the Chýně jih station, which is situated south of the town just beyond the municipal border.

== Sights ==
There are no protected cultural monuments in the town.
