= Městys =

Legal status of municipalities in the Czech Republic

Městys (obsolete and unofficially městečko, lit. 'small town'), translated as 'market town', is a status conferred on certain municipalities in the Czech Republic, lying in terms of size and importance higher than that of simple obec (municipality) but lower than that of město (city, town).

Historically, a městys was a locality that had the right to stage livestock markets (and some other "extraordinary" and annual markets), and it is therefore translated as "market town". The term went out of official use in Czechoslovakia in 1954 but was reintroduced in the Czech Republic in 2006. As of September 2020, there are 228 municipalities on which the status of městys has been re-admitted. In all cases, these are municipalities that have requested the return of their former title. This title has not been newly awarded to any municipality that would not have it in the past—the law does not even set any specific criteria for it, only procedural competencies are established. There are no special rights or competences under this title other than the right to use this word together with the name of the municipality and its bodies.

== Historical development of městys in the Czech Republic ==
=== Middle Ages and early modern period ===
The development of the městečko began in the 14th century, decreed by the reigning monarch primarily on the land of the nobility and church. From the 16th century on, it became possible for settlements with significant springs to get the title městys. The village then became entitled to call itself "městec", resulting in such place names as Městec Králové and Heřmanův Městec.

The typical městečko was very small, and a large number were created during the 14th century. Eduard Maur estimated that the average distance between two městečka was 5–20 km.

=== Early 20th century ===
After the creation of Czechoslovakia in 1918, the status was conferred by the Ministerial Council on the basis of a detailed application from the village. According to the "Statistický lexikon obcí v Republice československé" (Statistical lexicon of villages in Czechoslovakia), there were 503 městys in Czechoslovakia in 1930.

After the coup d'état of February 1948, the Communist ruling authorities ceased using the term by around 1950.

=== Late 20th century revival ===
After the Velvet Revolution of 1989, there was intense lobbying for the revival of the městys status from the representatives of villages which had previously held the title. On 27 January 2006 their efforts succeeded; the Chamber of Deputies of the Czech Republic approved an amendment to the Municipalities Act (Establishment of Municipalities) , which amongst other matters restored the title of městys. The amendment was approved by the Senate of the Czech Republic on 29 March, was signed by the president on 11 May and came into force on 1 July 2006.

Municipalities that had the right to carry the title of městys prior to 17 May 1954 are to inform the chairman of the Chamber of Deputies, so that the restoration of the status can be arranged.

On 10 October 2006, the chairman of the Chamber of Deputies announced the first 108 municipalities which can continue to use the title.

== Similar designations in other countries ==
Many other countries in Europe have similar designations, for example:

- Hungary and Slovakia: the Latin title oppidum; from 14th century to 1871 also Hungarian: mezőváros – lit. 'field town'
- Austria: German: Marktgemeinde. In other German-speaking areas the terms Flecken, Marktflecken and Markt are also used.
- Denmark: Danish: flække
- Sweden: Swedish: köping
- France: French: bourg

Městyse also existed on the territory of the Polish–Lithuanian Commonwealth, and before Communism these municipalities often used the terms:

- Polish: Miasteczko
- Russian: местечко (mestechko)
- Lithuanian: miestelis
- Latvian: miests
- Ukrainian: містечко (mistechko)
- Yiddish: שטעטל (shtetl)

== See also ==
- List of market towns in the Czech Republic
- List of municipalities in the Czech Republic that could become market town (in Czech)
