= Czech folklore =

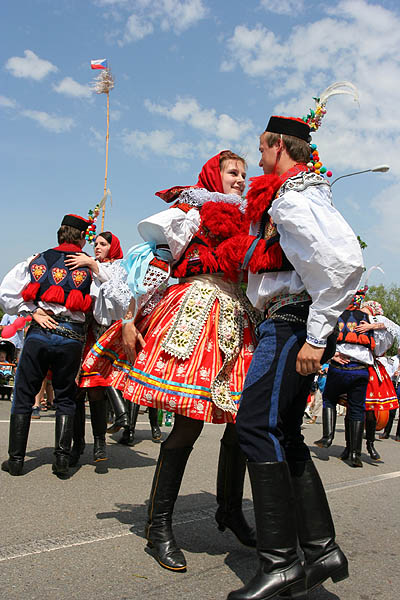
The folk costumes kroje, as seen in Vlčnov, Moravia, during a folklore feast

Czech folklore is the folk tradition which has developed among the Czech people over a number of centuries. Czech folklore was influenced by a mix of Christian and pagan customs. Nowadays it is preserved and kept alive by various folklore ensembles uniting members of all ages, from children to seniors, showing their talent during competitions, folklore festivals or other performances.

The Czech Republic is divided into a number of ethnographic regions. Each of them has special folklore traditions, songs or costumes and specializes in different crafts. As a result, Czech folklore provides a diverse source of entertainment.

== Music and dance ==
Music played an important part in life of common people or peasants in the Czech Republic. It offered both means of expression and a vent for their emotions. Resulting music varies not only by the region of its origin but also in the purpose of its use. Therefore, there are myriads of distinct folk songs.

Ľubomír Párička playing bagpipes, Slovakia

Music often addressed everyday issues and was passed down orally. From the 19th century onward it was recorded by ethnographers. Traditional celebrations such as welcome of the spring, successful harvest are still among the occasions traditionally celebrated with songs. More lively themes were used specifically during celebrations, weddings or feasts. Funerals and mournful occasions also had their own set of songs and tunes.

Songs and especially dances were often linked to conscription of Czech young men to the Army; they are called "verbuňk" in some regions. Conscriptions usually happened during wartimes and these songs have a particular place in Czech folklore music. They are listed by UNESCO in the List of the Intangible Cultural Heritage of Humanity.

There are a number of instruments associated with Czech folk music, which add to its distinct sound – violin and the double bass; instruments specific to Bohemia and Moravia such as bagpipes (bock), shepherd's pipe, dulcimer and trumpet.

All of them are still in active use by the folklore groups during their shows.

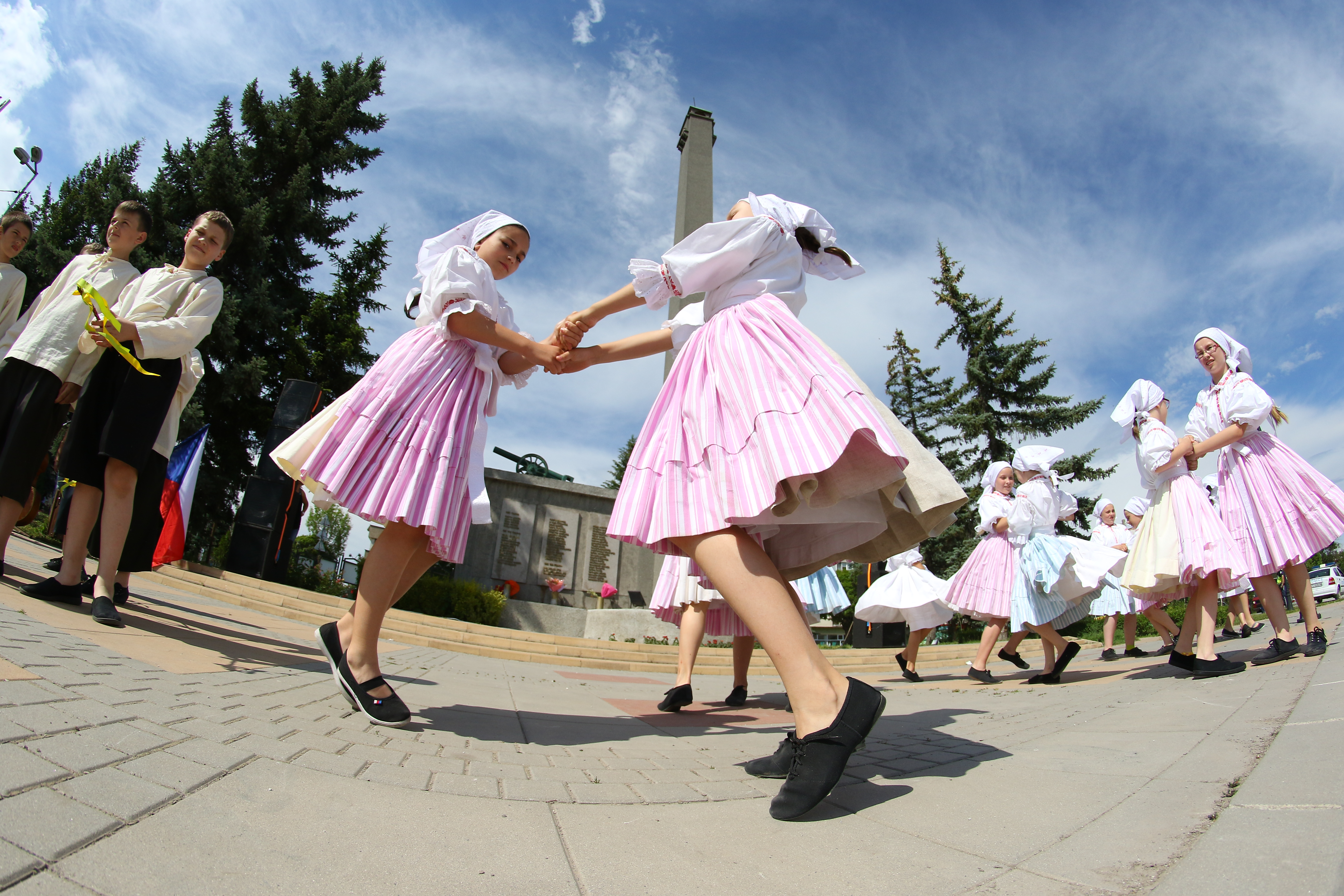
Folk dance from Czechia

Polka dance originated in Bohemia and still remains an integral part of folklore traditions especially in the western part of the country. Since the 19th century this dance has spread from Bohemia to many neighbouring European countries as well as overseas.

== Traditional Czech celebrations ==
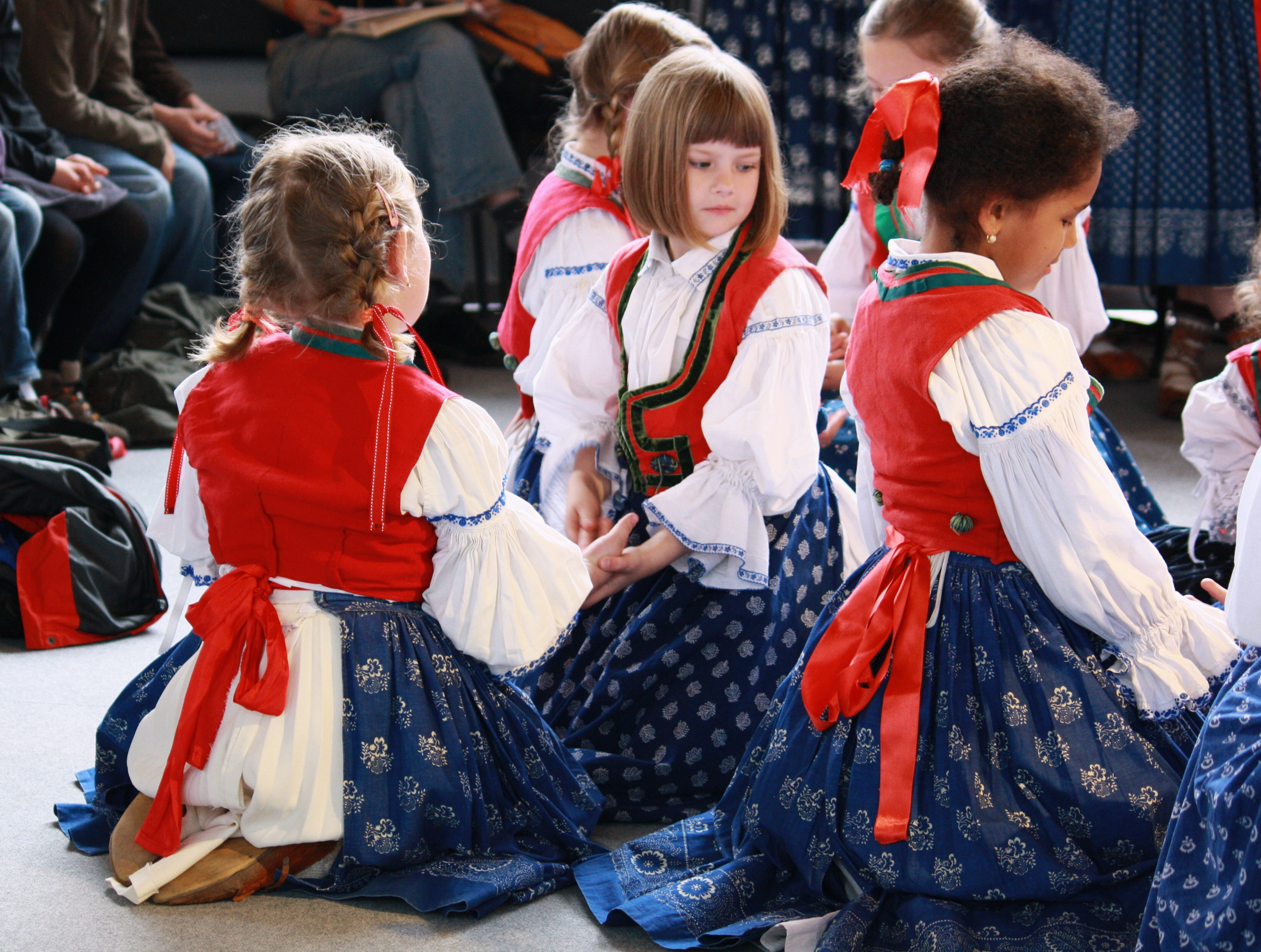
Wallachian folk costumes

Decorating Wallachian Easter eggs, Rožnov pod Radhoštěm

In the past, emphasis was placed on changes connected to the four seasons of the year; every season had its own specific traditions. In the spring, people practiced customs which would ensure health of their crops and future successful harvest. In the winter, it was most important to protect households and villagers against adverse effects of cold weather and supernatural forces.

Many Czech regions still hold traditional celebrations, which also revel in folklore music, dance and costumes. Among the most typical is Drowning of Morana, Shrovetide, erecting the maypole, grape harvest or celebration of Easter.

- Drowning of Morana: to celebrate the end of the winter, young girls in a number of villages build an effigy of a woman out of straw and branches, and dress the figure in old clothes. The woman represents a Slavic goddess of winter and is associated with death. Therefore, her destruction symbolizes the beginning of new life in spring. After taking the figure out of the village in a solemn procession, Morana is set on fire and then thrown into the water by singing girls.
- Shrovetide (Masopust): also serves to celebrate spring and ensure the fertility of future harvest. It includes a carnival-like procession of singing people dressed in masks of beasts and animals.
- Easter celebrations: the most distinctive customs preserved in the Czech Republic are spanking women solemnly with a whip made of thin willow branches (pomlázka); or drenching them with cold water to symbolically guarantee their good health. In exchange, men often receive traditional food, decorated eggs and (recently), alcoholic beverages.
- Burning of witches: also known as Walpurgis Night in German speaking countries; according to the traditional Czech stories, the night on the turn of April 30 and May 1 had a magical power. Not only was evil believed to be more powerful at this time, but also those who felt brave enough to go outside could find treasures if they carried with them items such as wood fern flower, wafer or sanctified chalk. It was also believed that during the night witches were flying and gathering for the Sabbath. To protect themselves, villagers burnt bonfires on hills and set fire to brooms, which were then thrown into the air to reveal any flying witch. These celebrations are nowadays accompanied with music and traditional food and mark the opening of the tourist season.
- Erecting a Maypole: unmarried men in southern parts of the Czech Republic and in Slovacko cut off trees such as fir, spruce or pine to make a traditional maypole out of it over night representing spring. The branches are cut off and only the top of the tree is left and decorated with ribbons and flowers. The maypole is then erected in the middle of the village. It is important to guard one's maypole because men from other villages may try to cut it down as a form of contest.

== Traditional costumes ==
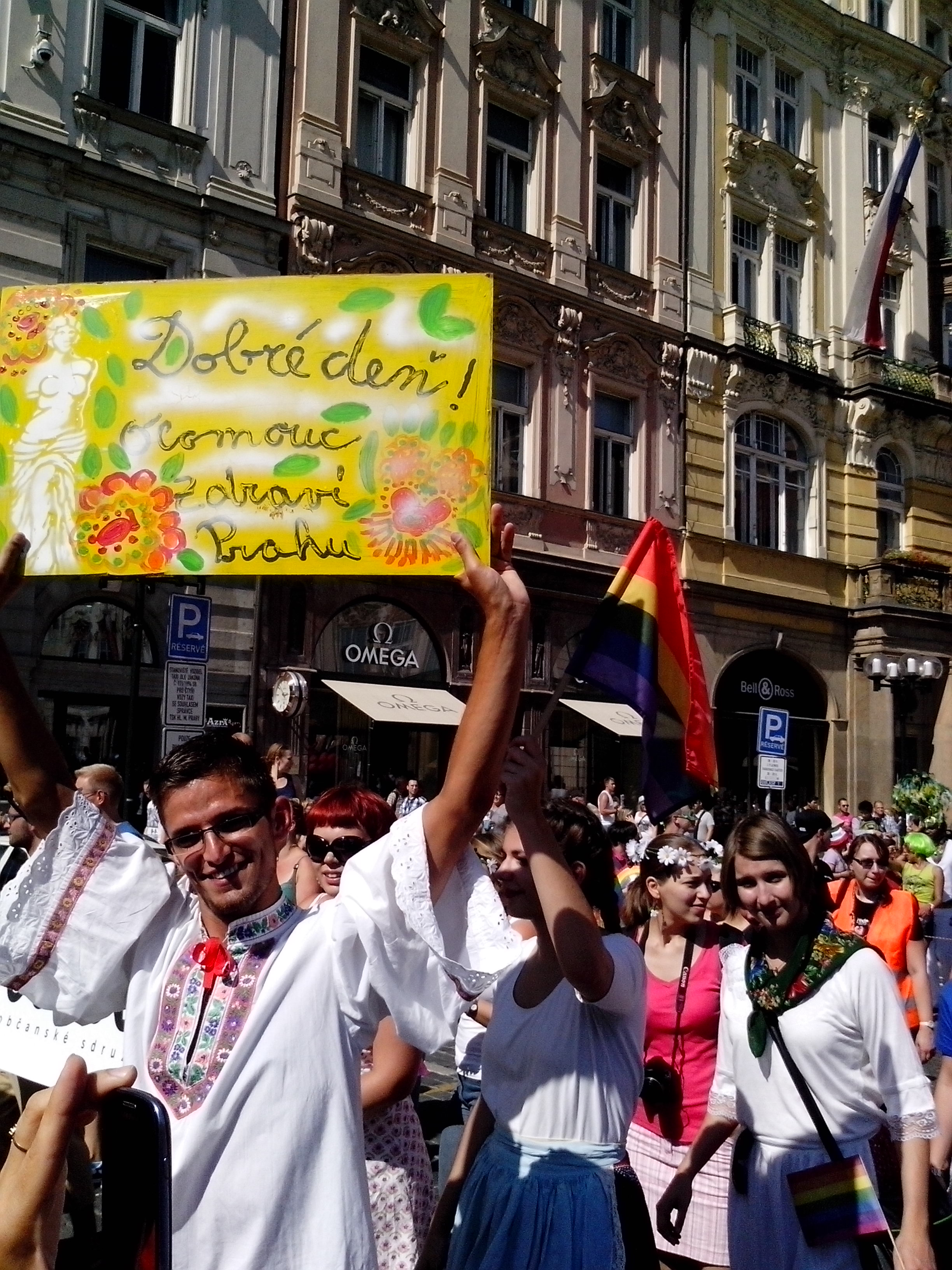
A participant of 2013 Prague Pride wearing a traditional Moravian costume (Hanakia) and a sign "Good day - Olomouc greets Prague"

Folklore is not merely about music. Czech folklore is characteristic for elaborate traditional costumes distinctive to each region or even village.

Specific aspects such as colors, embroidery, themes and fragments of traditional costumes varied on the basis of social, geographical and symbolical factors as well as according to the purpose of their use. Costumes worn on special occasions were usually lavishly decorated, colorful and accompanied with a wide range of accessories (scarves, ribbons, headdresses, hats, belts, etc.) while everyday clothes tended to be rather simple and practical. Every region had a set of amusing peculiarities. For example:

- Women in the Plzen region wore up to 24 underskirts, which restricted their movement but were nevertheless a show of their fashionableness.
- While married women in Hanakia wore plain clothes and hid their hair under bonnets and headdresses even from their own husbands, their men wore their hair long and even their clothes were flauntingly colorful and decorated.

Traditional costumes are no longer commonly worn in most parts of the Czech Republic. They may be used during traditional celebrations or festivals when worn by members of folklore ensembles. In some families, costumes are handed down from generation to generation as they wish to preserve the tradition. Likewise, many stay protected in museums and private collections.

== Folklore festivals ==
Multiple folklore shows and festivals are organized in the Czech Republic throughout the year. They are a display of rich Czech traditions and folklore. At the festivals, various folklore groups demonstrate the heritage of their country. The performers are presented in traditional costumes particular to different regions of the Czech Republic. They perform folk dances, traditional folk songs and play musical instruments. Many festivals are not only demonstrations of music and dances, but also show traditional cuisine and crafts.

There are many folklore festivals in the Czech Republic.

- Moonlight in Prague The biggest and most famous international folklore festivals is "Moonlight in Prague" held traditionally once per year in July.
- Vlčnov: probably the most famous one is a festival called "Ride of the Kings". This festival takes place every year and can be also found on the list of UNESCO.
- Strážnice: Another unique folklore festival. Not only does this festival present traditional Czech folklore, but also folklore groups from all over the world visit the town to show their own traditions.
- Strakonice: The Bohemian city holds an annual bagpipe festival that attracts the locals, as well as foreign tourists. The festival is a parade and a meeting place of Czech and international bagpipe players.

== Folklore groups ==
Czech Republic is abundant in folklore groups of all kinds. Their goal is to preserve local traditions and folklore and to pass the heritage on to the following generations. Members of the folklore groups are enthusiasts of all ages: from little children through adolescents to adults. They all enjoy building up folklore spirit with dances, music and showing off beautiful folklore dresses, as well as performing in front of audiences at folklore festivals. Children are encouraged to participate in folklore ensembles from a very early age.

== Traditional arts and crafts ==
Traditional arts and crafts are an inseparable part of Czech folklore.

- Corn dolly (figurka z kukuřičného šustí): among the most popular traditional products. These dolls made of few materials including corn husk and strings are nowadays used as decorations but in the past children used them as toys. Corn dollies are also sold as souvenirs tourists can buy in the Czech Republic.
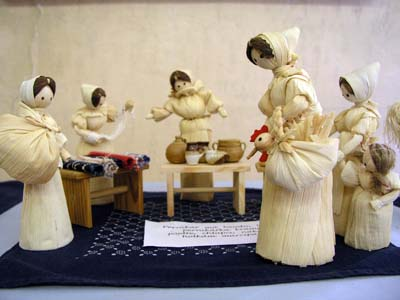
  Corn dollies exposed in Žamberk, East Bohemia Region
- Pottery: another popular traditional artistic product. Bohemian and Moravian pottery is painted with various folklore patterns, simple or floral ornaments. The pottery serves for both decorative and practical purposes.

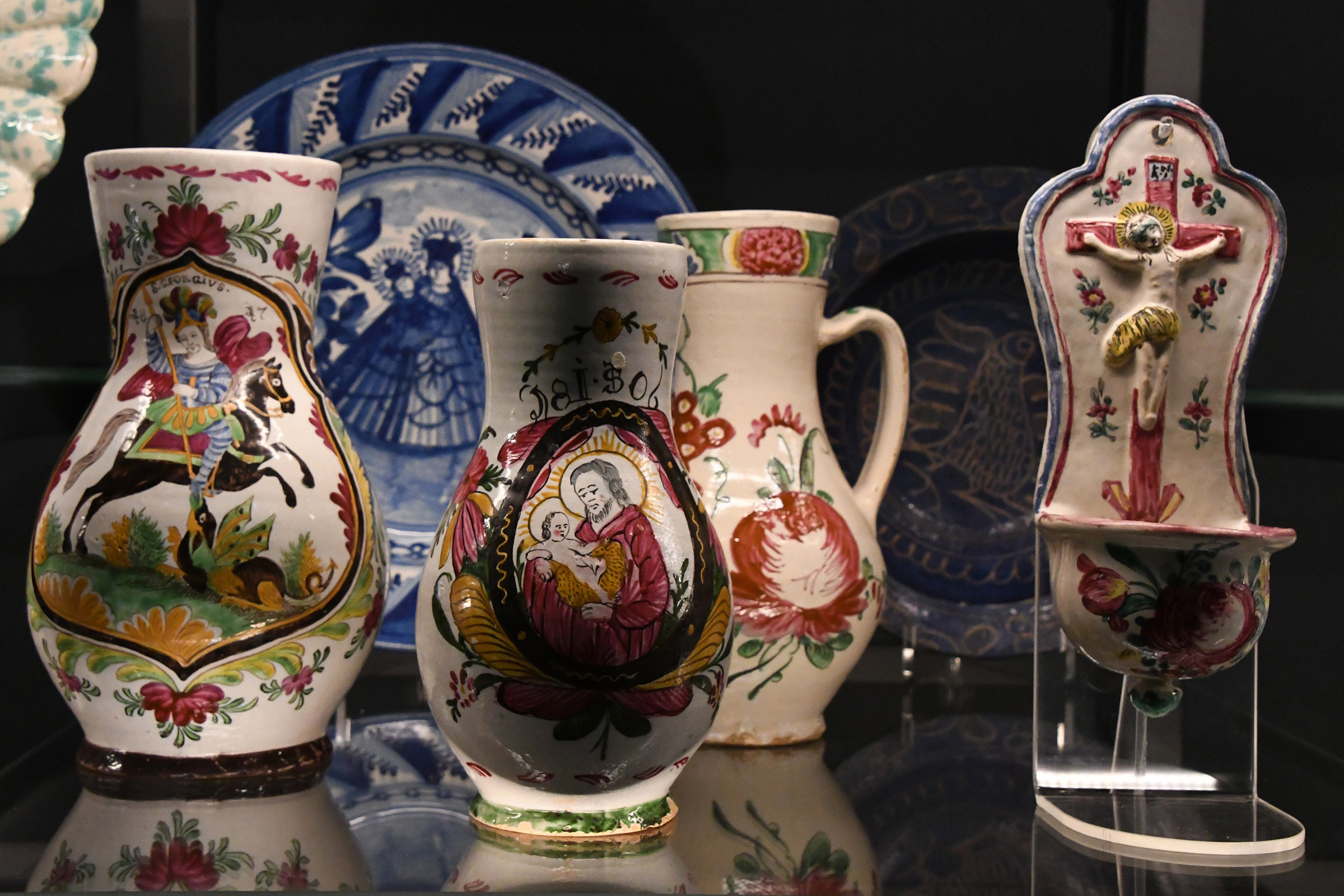
Czech and Moravian ceramic creations with folk motifs

- Bobbin lace: also one of the popular traditional items. The most famous Czech bobbin lace products are made in Vamberk, a city in Eastern Bohemia.

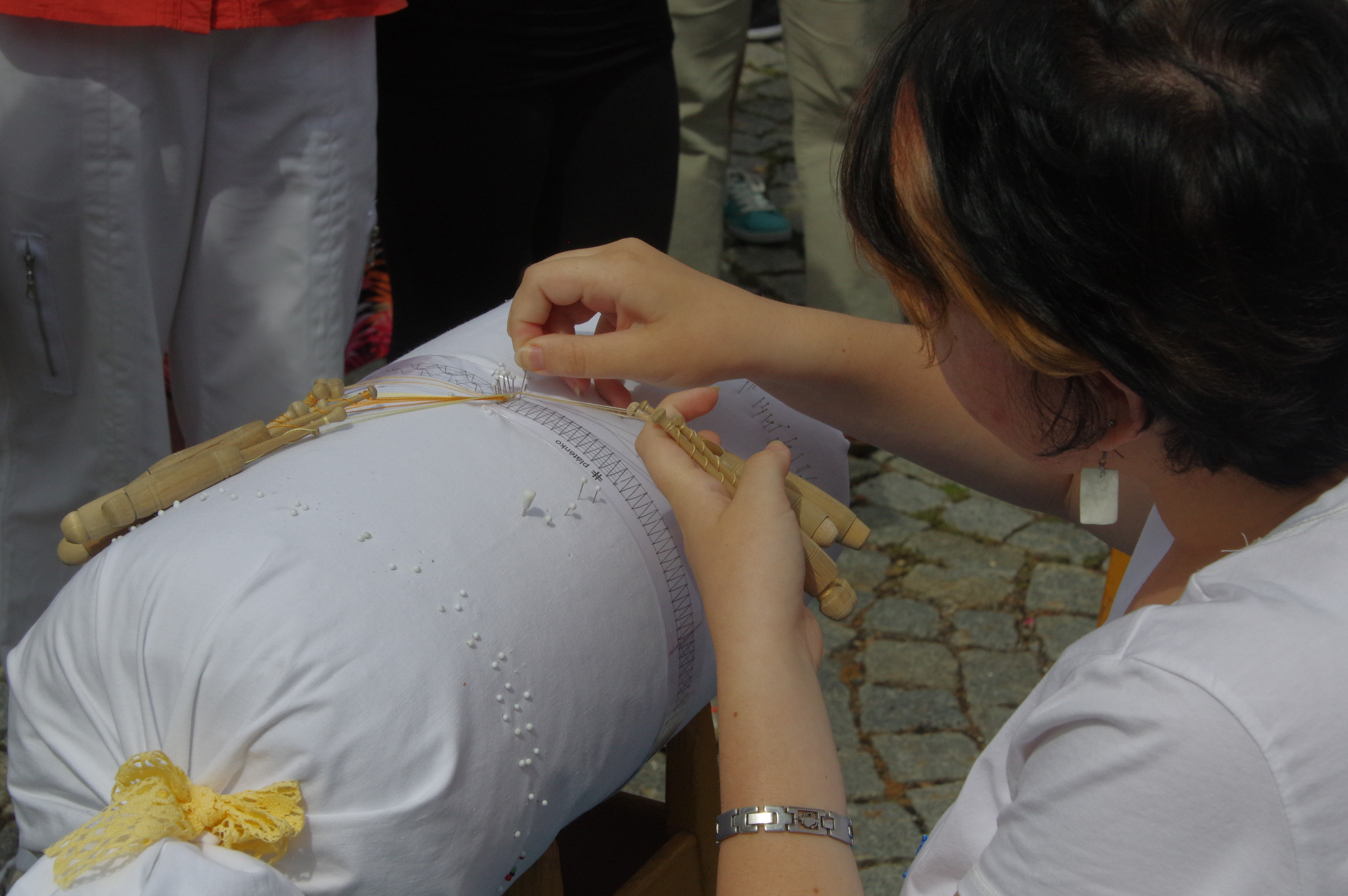
Sedlice Lace Festival, August 2016, Sedlice (Strakonice District), South Bohemia Region

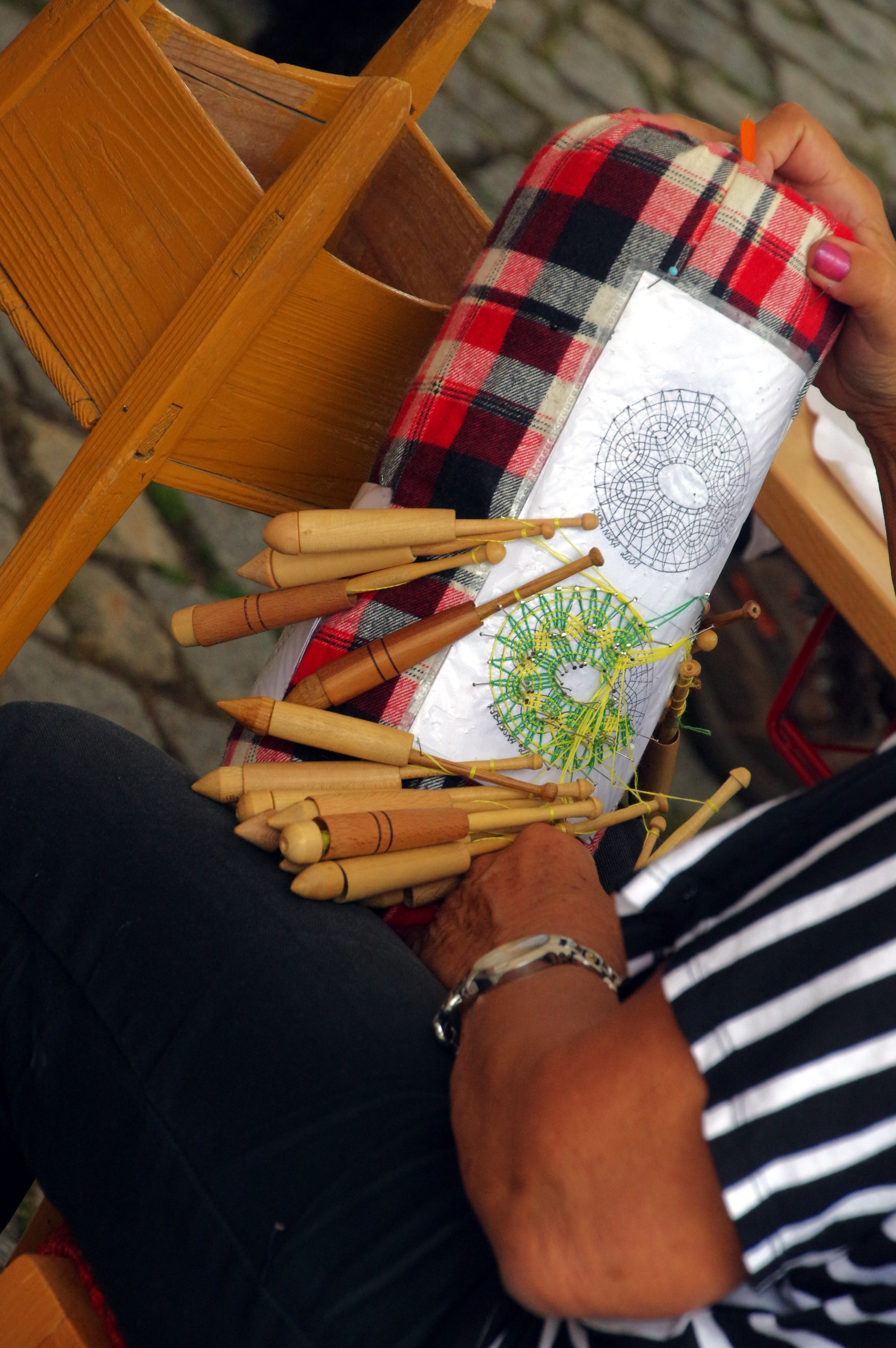
Sedlice Lace Festival, August 2016, Sedlice (Strakonice District), South Bohemian Region

- The Czech Republic is also renowned for its production of glass (see Bohemia Crystal) which is made into various products, such as glasses, bowls, vases, and beads. It is listed twice for holding intangible cultural heritage at UNESCO regarding artisanal glassware, in 2020 for its expertise in the handmade production of Christmas tree decorations from blown glass beads, and in 2023 among other countries for its knowledge, craft and skills of handmade glass production.
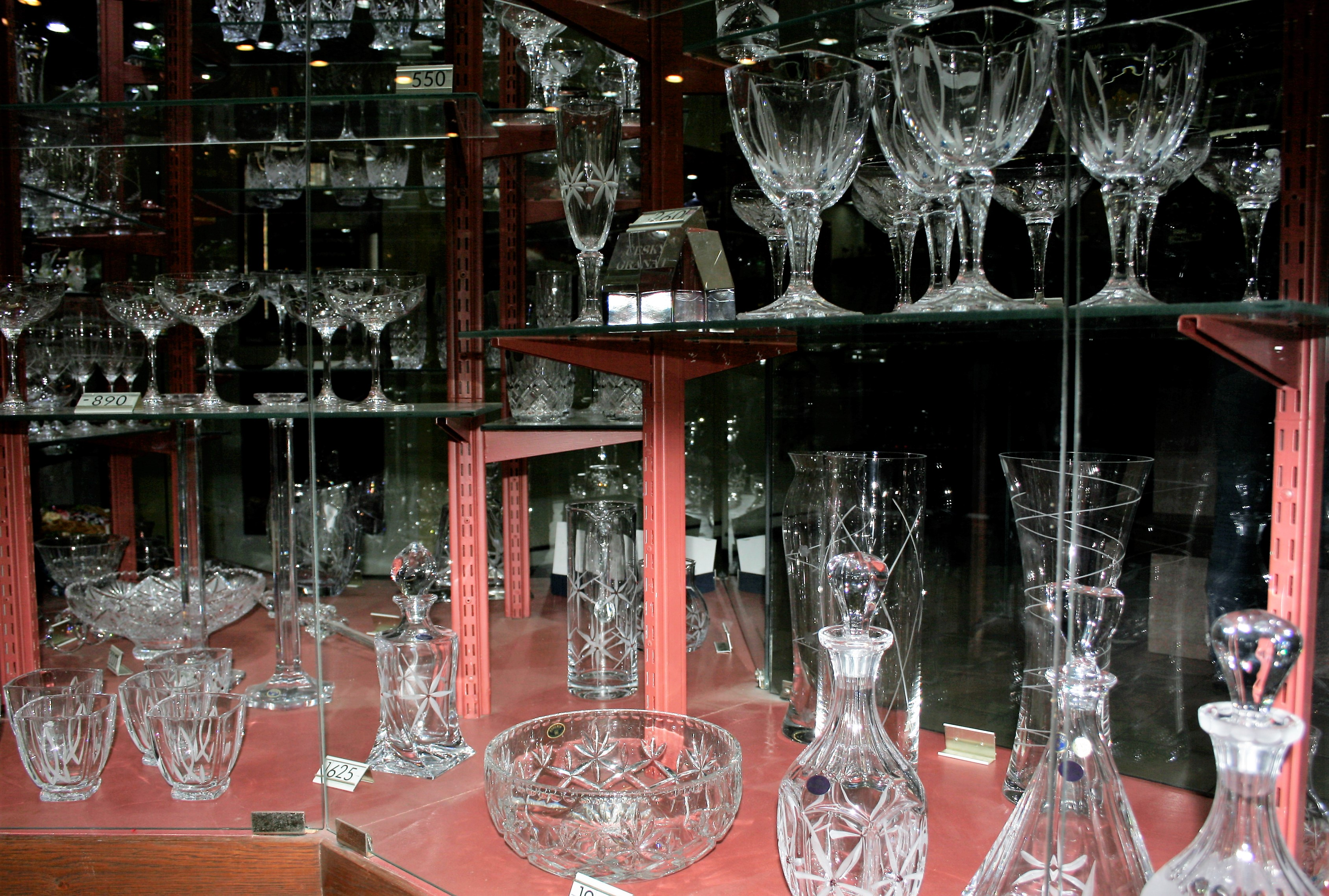
  Exposition at the museum of Sklárna Annín, Dlouhá Ves (Klatovy District), Southwest Bohemia Region

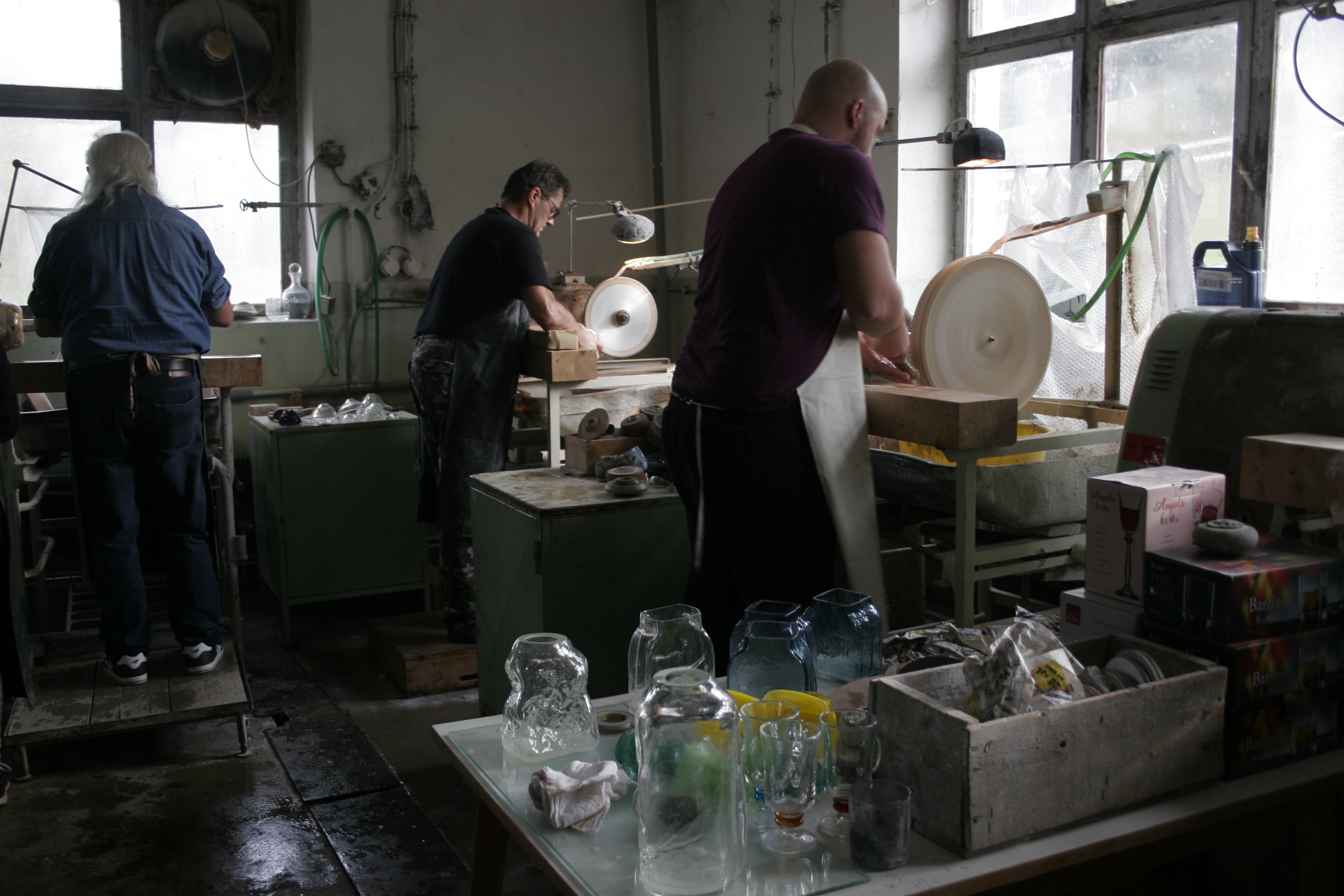
Glass factory Sklárna Annín, Dlouhá Ves (Klatovy District), Southwest Bohemia Region

- Indigo print products: hand-made textile goods. The technique used to print the textile is called Modrotisk in Czechia, it is a traditional practice which was inscribed on the UNESCO in 2018. Tablecloths, toys, and other accessories are made of the dyed textile.

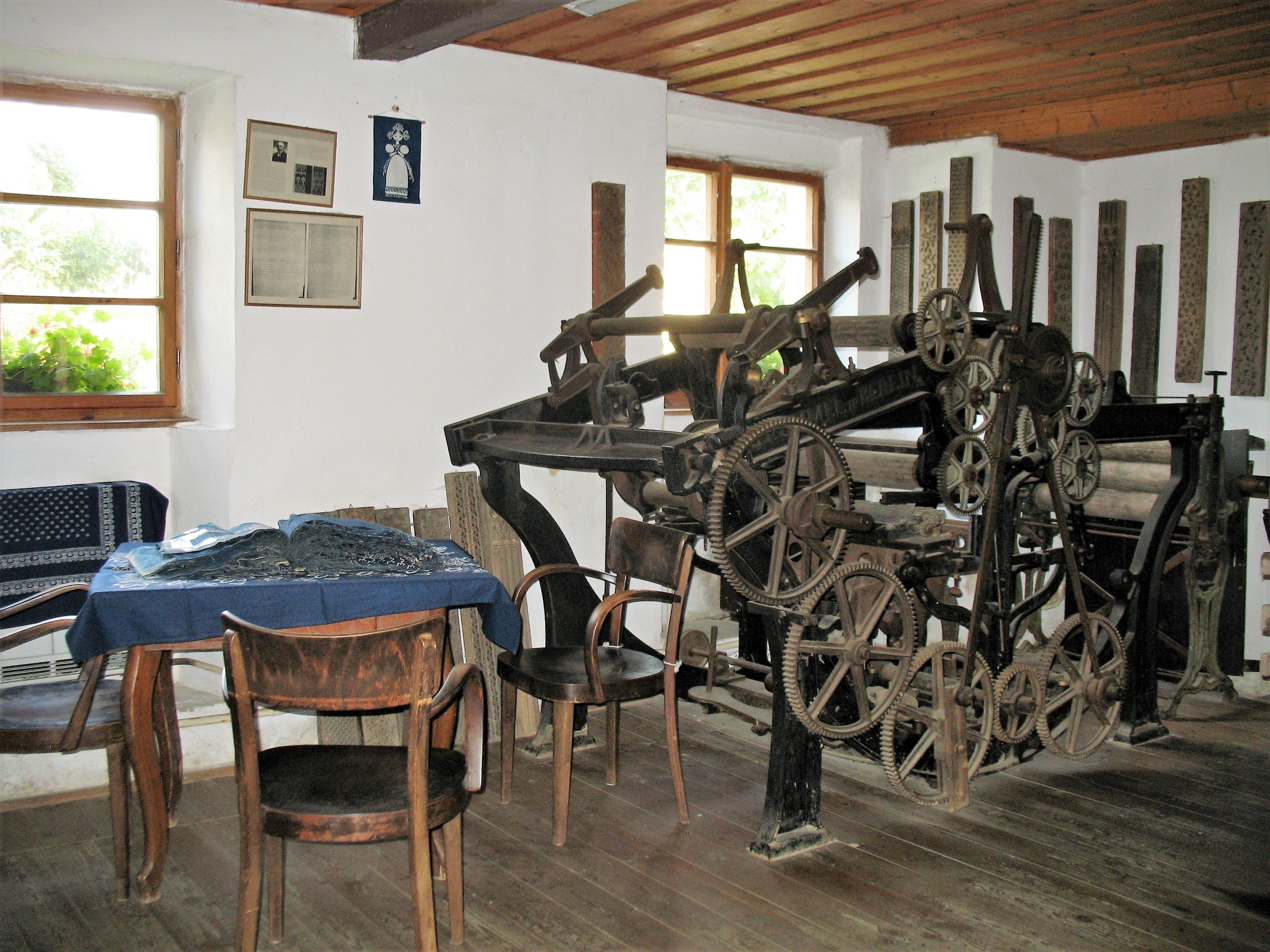
Blue printing craft production of Danzinger family, active since 1816, in Olešnice (Blansko District), South Moravia Region

== See also ==
- Slavic mythology
