= Josef Kalousek =

Czech historian (1838–1915)

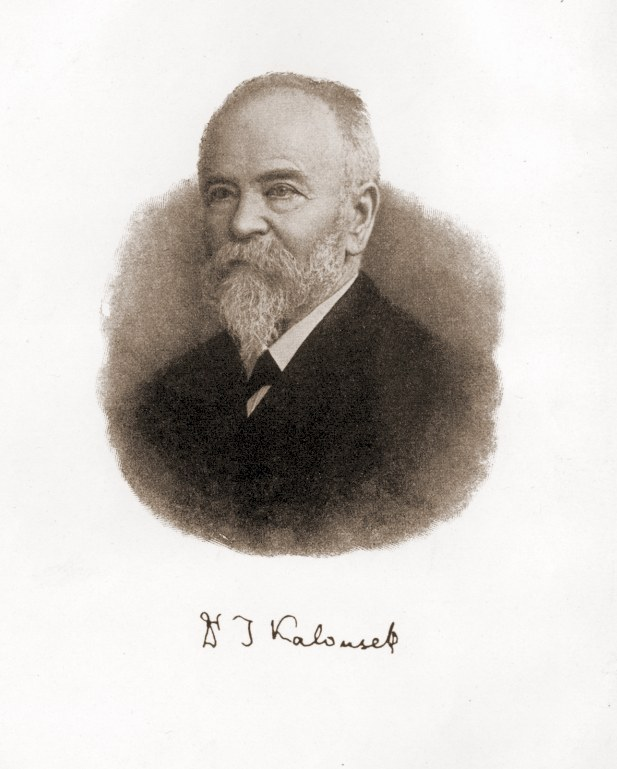
- Josef Kalousek
- Born: 2 April 1838; Vamberk, Bohemia, Austrian Empire
- Died: 22 November 1915; Prague, Bohemia, Austria-Hungary
- Education: University of Vienna
- Occupation: Historian

Josef Kalousek (2 April 1838 – 22 November 1915) was a Czech historian and professor of Czech history at Charles University in Prague.

== Life ==
Josef Kalousek was born in a poor farmer family in Vamberk.

== Work ==
=== Bibliography in Czech ===
- České státní právo (1871)
- Nástin životopisu Františka Palackého (1876)
- Karel IV., Otec vlasti (1878)
- Děje Královské České společnosti nauk (1885)
- Tři historické mapy k dějinám českým (1885)
- Výklad k historické mapě Čech (1894)
- O vůdčích myšlenkách v historickém díle Františka Palackého (1896)
- Obrana knížete Václava Svatého proti smyšlenkám a křivým úsudkům o jeho povaze (1901)
- O potřebě prohloubiti vědomosti o Husovi a jeho době (1915)

=== Bibliography in German ===
- Einige Grundlagen des böhmischen Staatsrechts. Prague 1871.
- Die Behandlung der Geschichte Přemysl Otakars II in Professor O. Lorenz' Deutscher Geschichte im 13. und 14. Jahrhundert. Prague 1874.
- Geschichte der Königlichen Böhmischen Gesellschaft der Wissenschaften: sammt einer kritischen Übersicht ihrer Publicationen aus dem Bereiche der Philosophie, Geschichte und Philologie, aus Anlass des hundertjährigen Jubelfestes der Gesellschaft 1884 in ihrem Auftrage verfaßt von Josef Kalousek. Prag: Königlich Böhmische Ges. der Wiss., 1884.

=== Articles in magazines ===
- O historii výtvarného umění v Čechách, Osvěta (1877)
- O zřízení a původu obce velkoruské (1880)
- O historii kalicha v dobách předhusitských, Výroční školní zpráva nižšího reálného gymnasia v Praze III, (1881)
- Jan z Jenštejna – archiepiscopus Pragensis, Zprávy KČSN (1882)
- Historie a materialismus, ČČM (1883)
- O staročeském právě dědickém a královském právě odúmrtním na statcích svobodných v Čechách i v Moravě, Rozpravy České akademie (1894)
- Řády selské an instrukce hospodářské, Archiv Český, sv. 5.
