= Kroj =

Folk costume of the Czech Republic and Slovakia

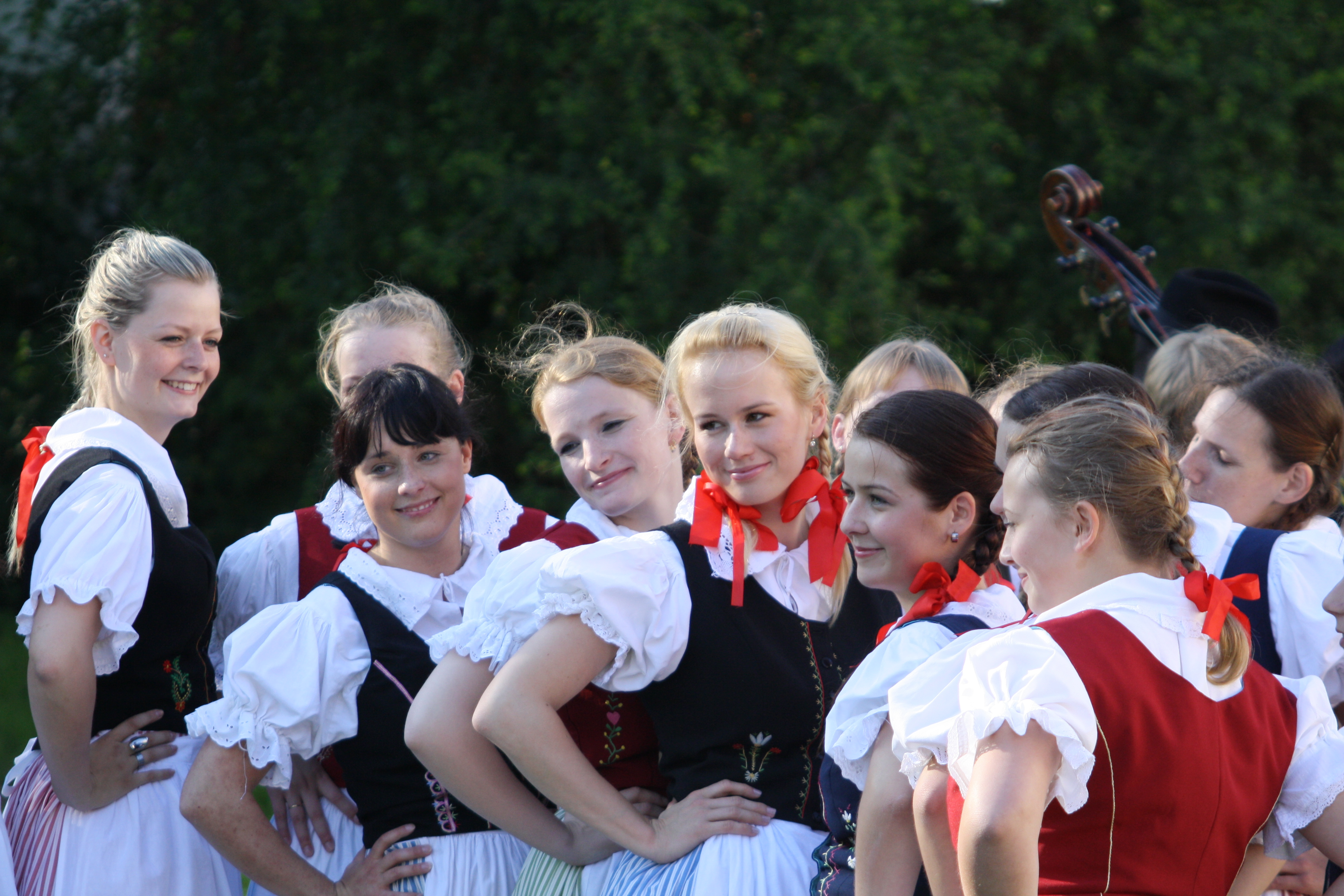
Kroje from Horácko region

Kroj (Czech pronunciation: [ˈkroj]; plural: kroje) is a folk costume worn by Czechs and Slovaks. Gothic influence is seen in tying shawls and kerchiefs on the head. Fine pleats and gathered lace collars typify the Renaissance era. From Baroque bell-shaped skirts to delicate Slavic patterns, these folk costumes show the complex growth of Czech and Slovak traditions.

== Types ==
Kroje had many regional variants with typical decorations and/or colours. There are three basic types of kroj:

1. the simple one, used in everyday life that looks very similar in all regions.
2. the celebration one, used for Sunday masses, feasts etc.
3. the wedding one - used only by a bride or a groom. As it was not reasonable to have a one-purpose clothing, it was often a celebration one upgraded by typical wedding accessories.

Kroje are no longer worn by people in the Czech Republic and Slovakia often, usually reserving them for feasts and celebrations.

Kroje started being replaced by modern clothing during the 19th century: it started in bigger cities, and towns and villages followed. It began in more industrial places in Bohemia with men specifically, so in old photos it is possible to see a father in a suit, but a mother (and possibly children) in a kroj. The last regions where kroje were worn on everyday or almost everyday basis were regions near the border between Moravia and Slovakia – Moravian Slovakia, Horňácko, Moravian Wallachia - where old women could be seen wearing kroje even in the second half of 20th century.

== Gallery ==
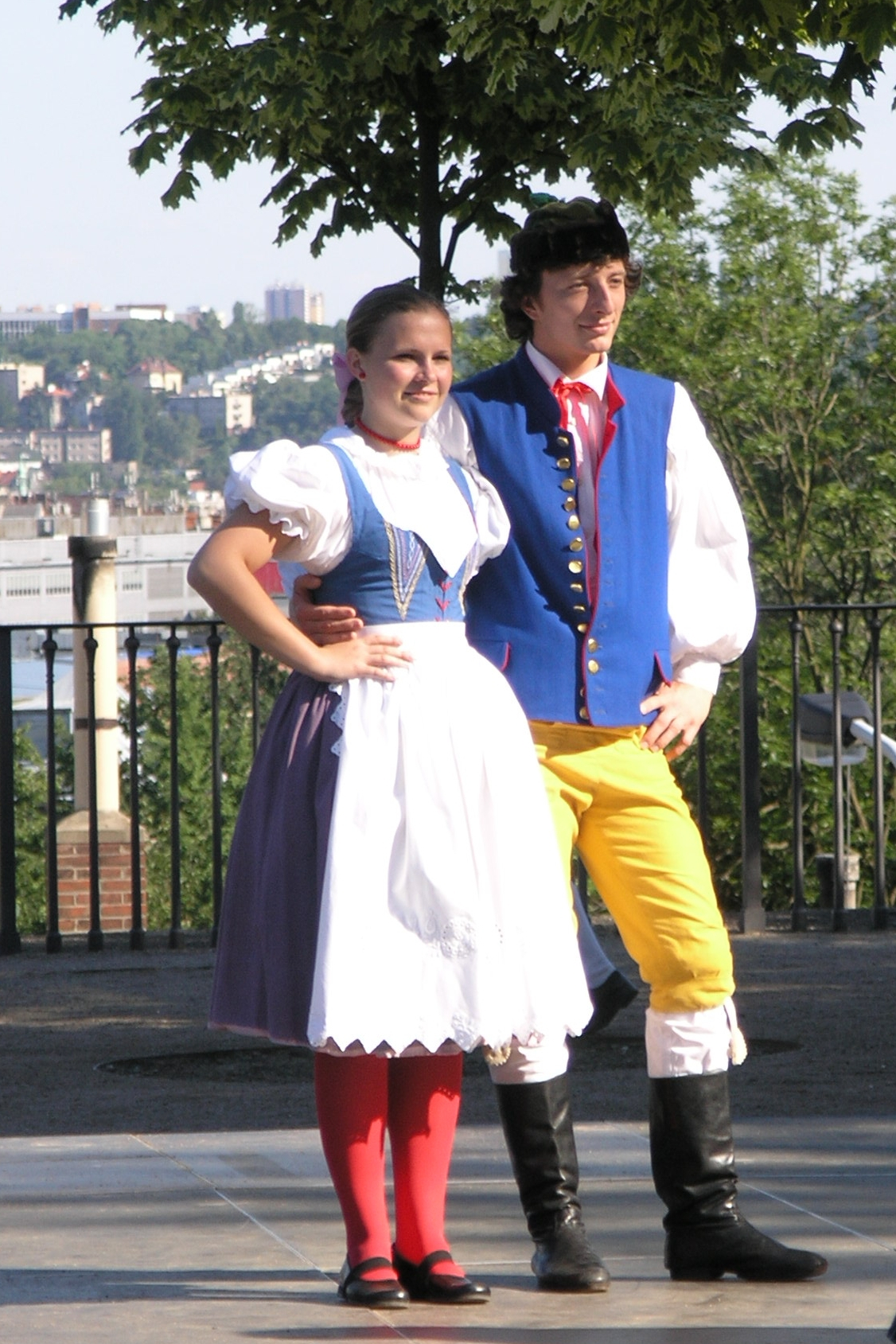
A couple wearing traditional Bohemian kroj from Prácheňsko area

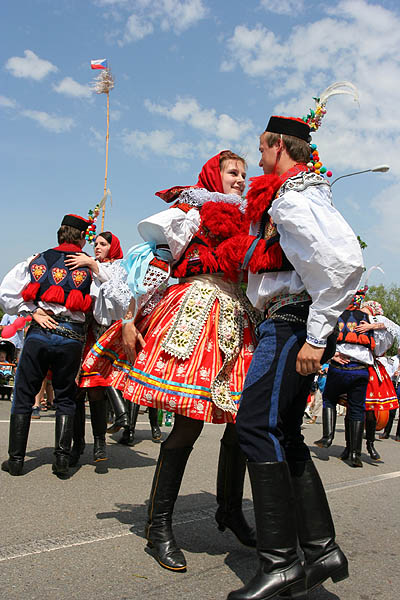
The folk costume of kroj seen in Vlčnov in Moravian Slovakia

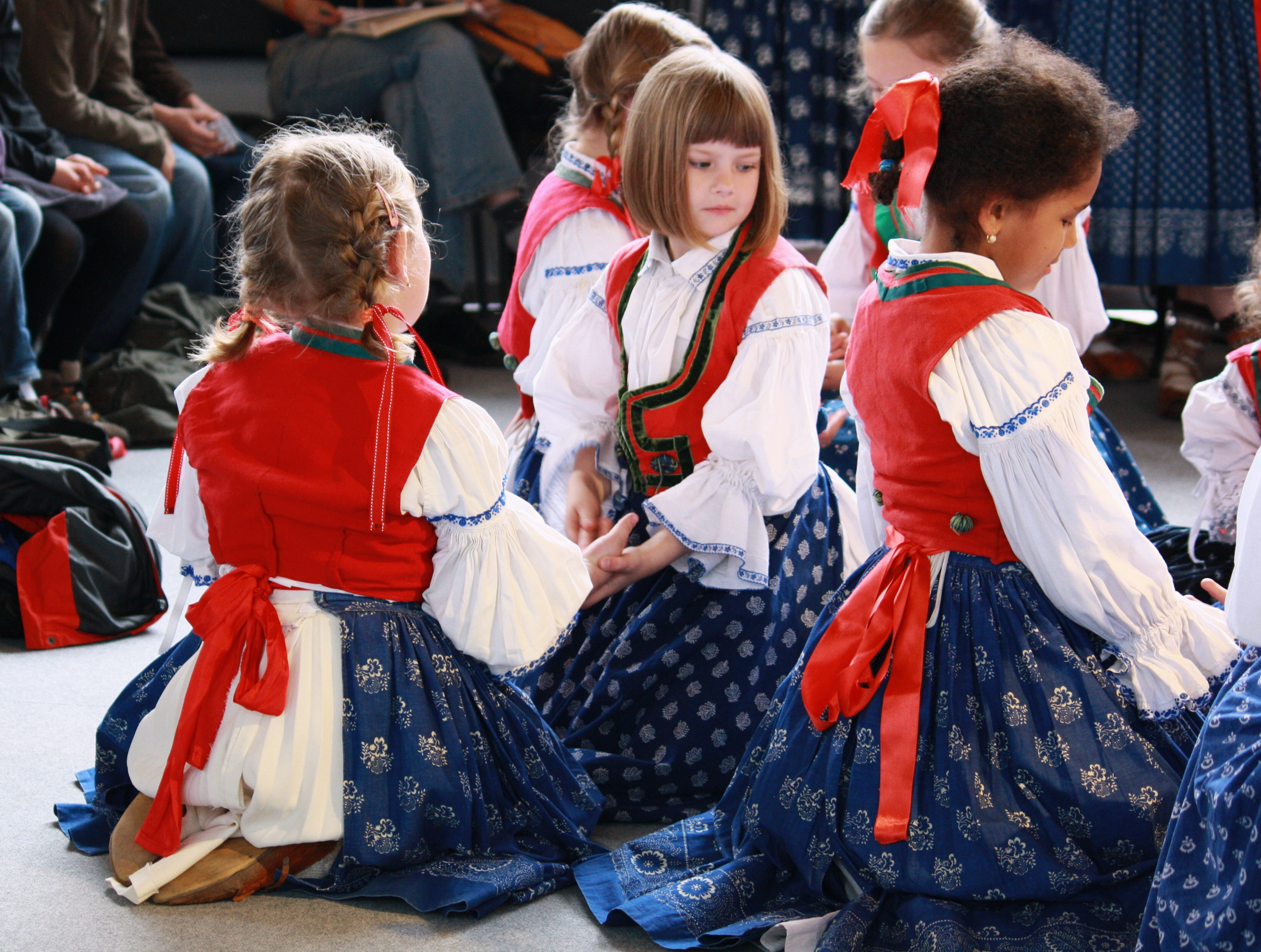
Kroje from Moravian Wallachia

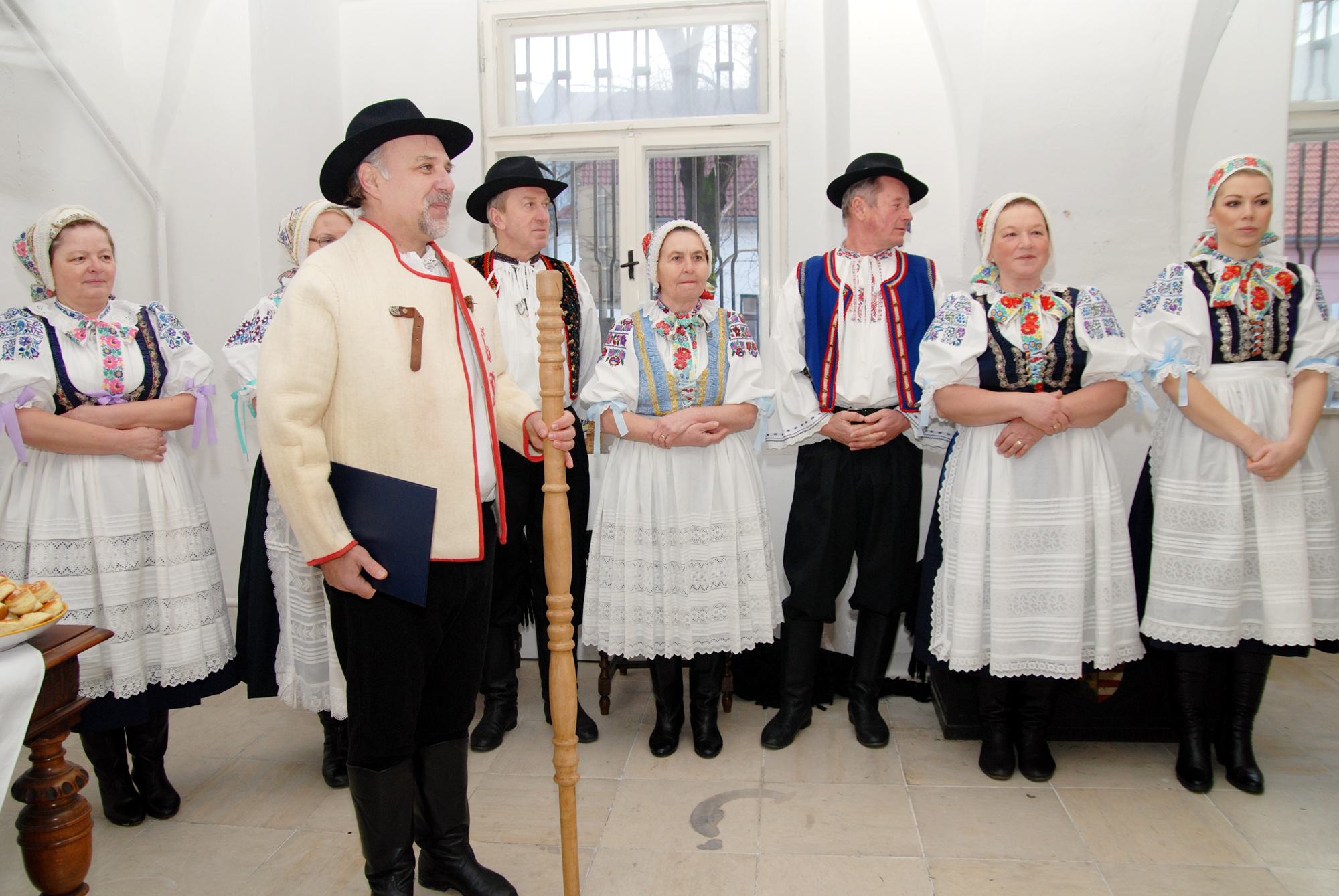
Folk costumes of Slovakia

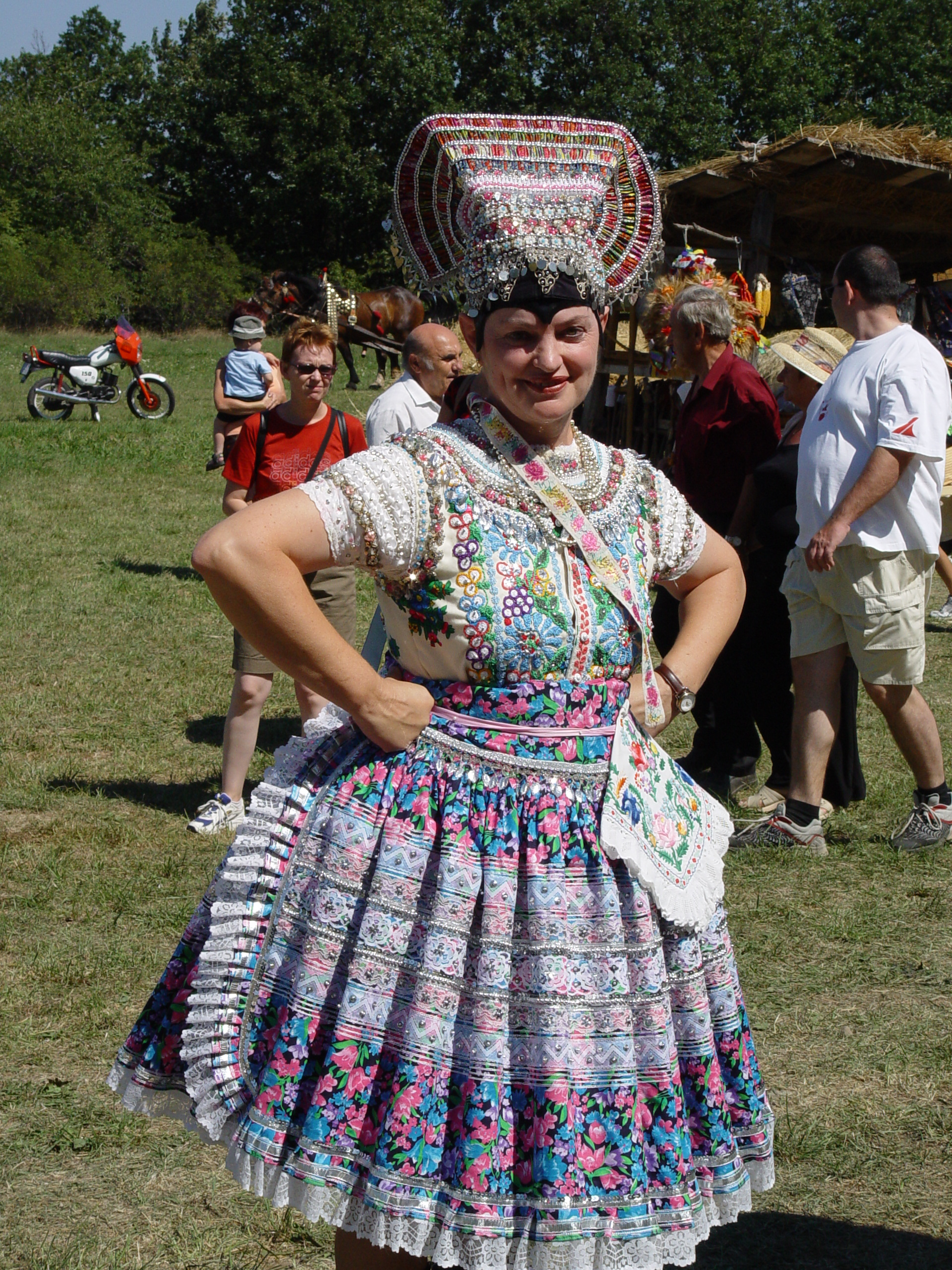
Slovak kroj from the Hont region

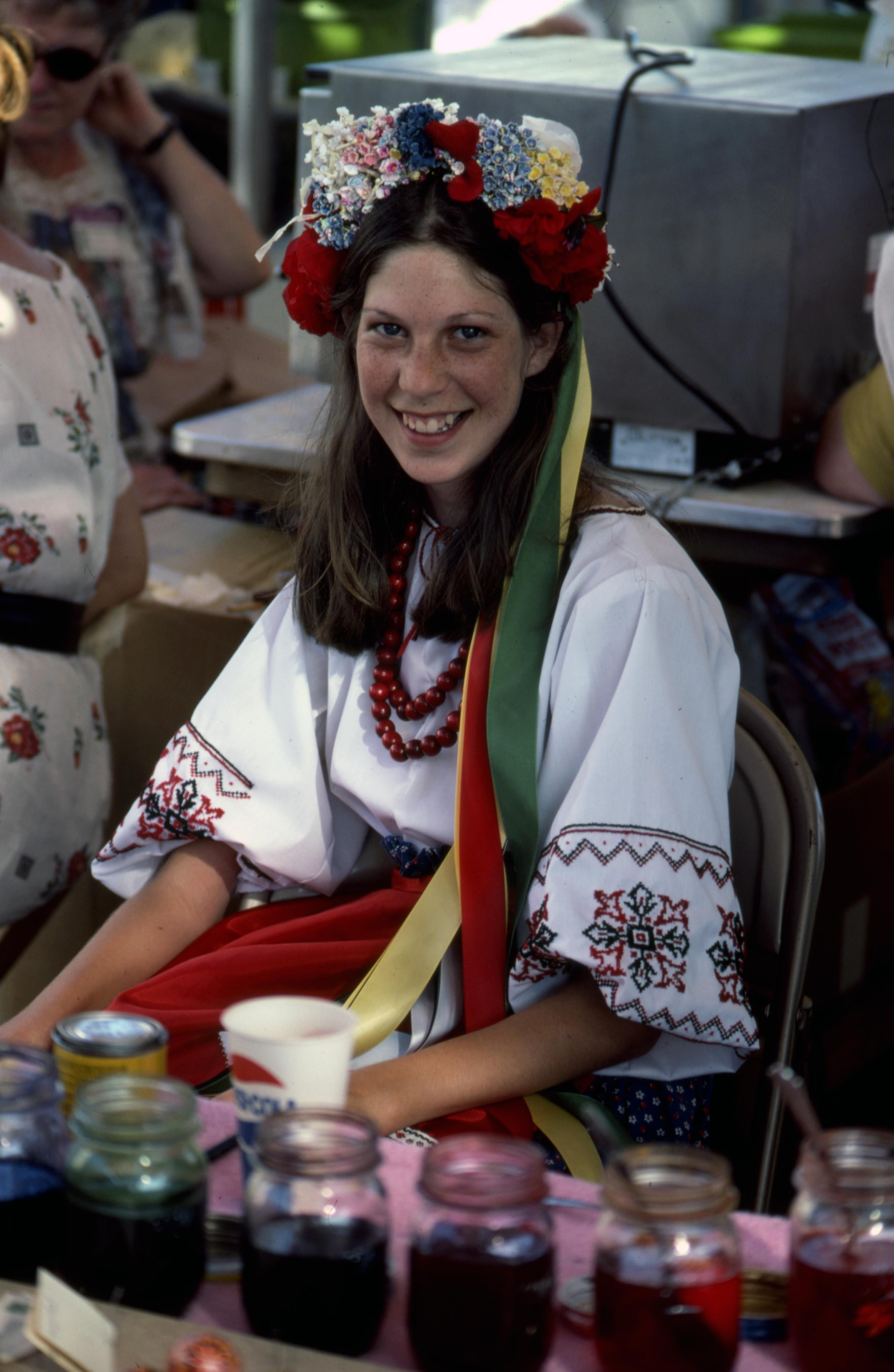
Czech Americanized kroj from Ennis, Texas, 1976
