= Dlouhá Ves (Klatovy District) =

- Municipality
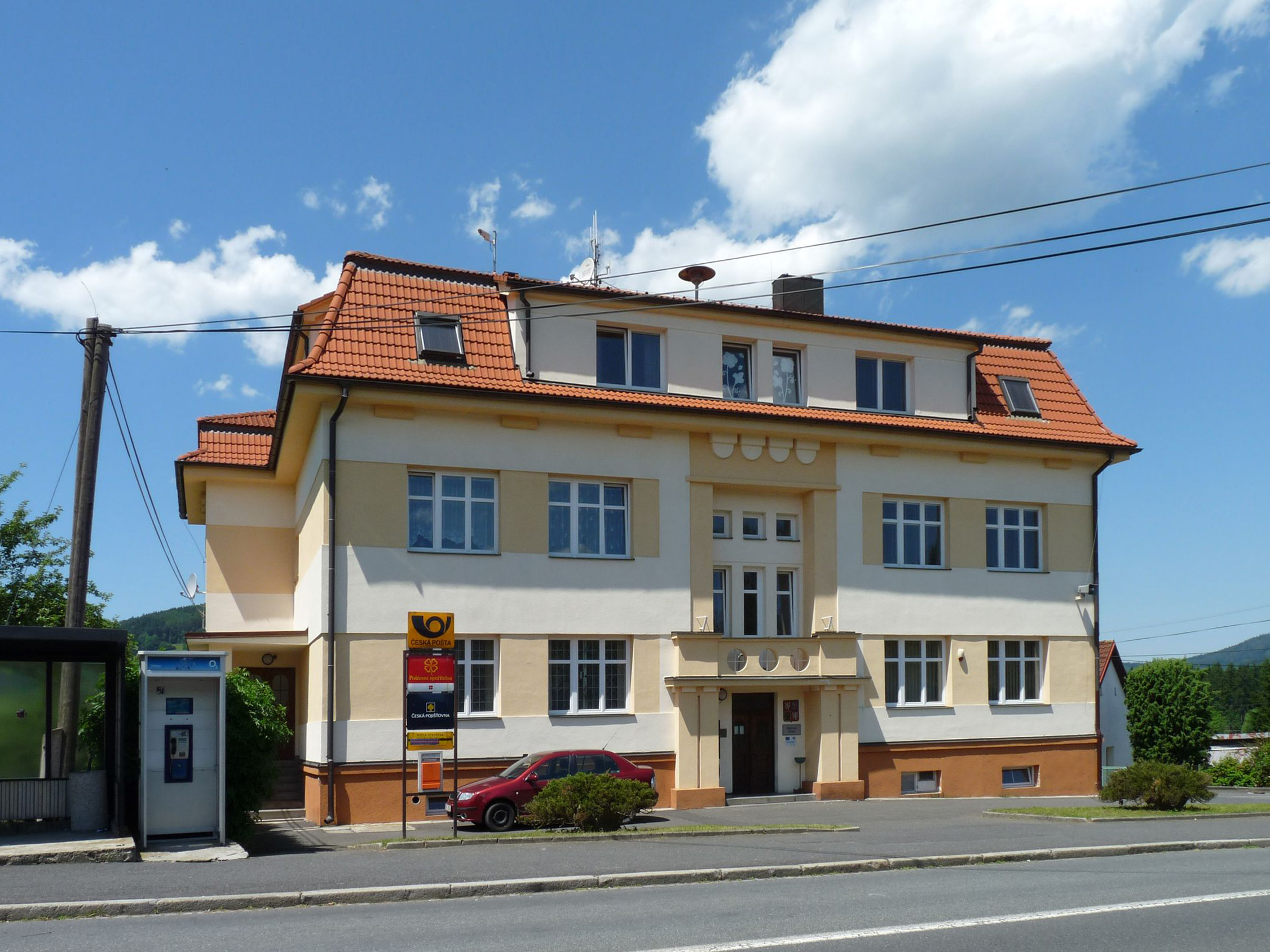
- Municipal office

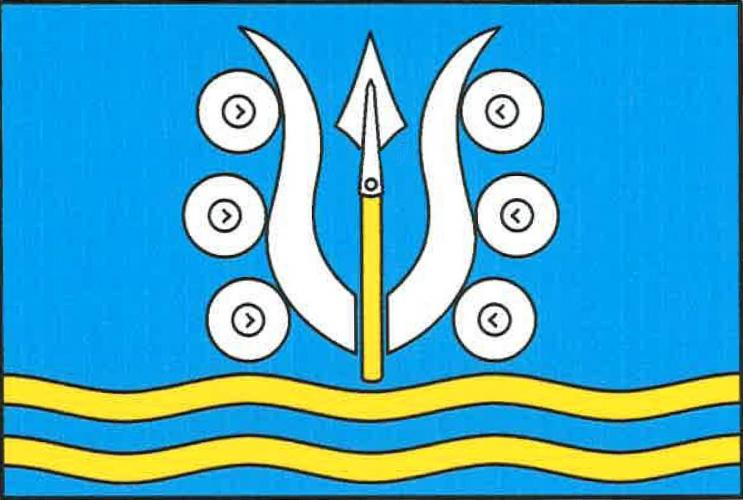
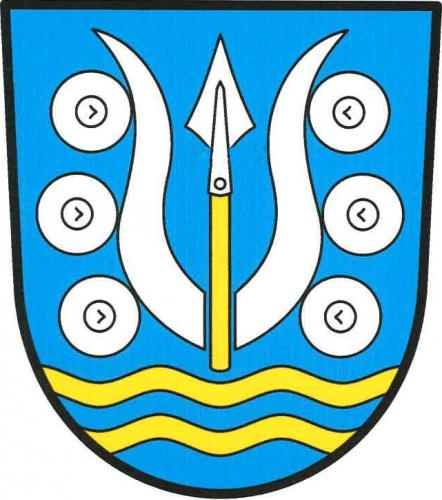
- Flag Coat of arms

- Location in the Czech Republic
- Coordinates: 49°11′38″N 13°30′6″E
- Country: Czech Republic
- Region: Plzeň
- District: Klatovy
- First mentioned: 1290

Area
  - Total: 14.99 km^{2} (5.79 sq mi)
- Elevation: 512 m (1,680 ft)

Population (2026-01-01)
  - Total: 867
  - Density: 57.8/km^{2} (150/sq mi)
- Time zone: UTC+1 (CET)
  - Summer (DST): UTC+2 (CEST)
- Postal code: 342 01
- Website: www.sumavanet.cz/dlouhaves/

Dlouhá Ves (German: Langendorf) is a municipality and village in Klatovy District in the Plzeň Region of the Czech Republic. It has about 900 inhabitants.

Dlouhá Ves lies approximately 28 kilometres (17 mi) south-east of Klatovy, 63 km (39 mi) south of Plzeň, and 120 km (75 mi) south-west of Prague.

== Administrative division ==
Dlouhá Ves consists of seven municipal parts (in brackets population according to the 2021 census):

- Dlouhá Ves (665)
- Annín (56)
- Bohdašice (45)
- Janovice (26)
- Nové Městečko (21)
- Platoř (7)
- Rajsko (19)

== Demographics ==
Historical population
Year	Pop.	±%
1869	2,053	—
1880	2,190	+6.7%
1890	2,150	−1.8%
1900	2,182	+1.5%
1910	2,113	−3.2%
1921	2,107	−0.3%
1930	2,133	+1.2%
1950	1,060	−50.3%
1961	1,162	+9.6%
1970	1,047	−9.9%
1980	865	−17.4%
1991	802	−7.3%
2001	777	−3.1%
2011	817	+5.1%
2021	839	+2.7%
Source: Censuses
