= Czech lace =

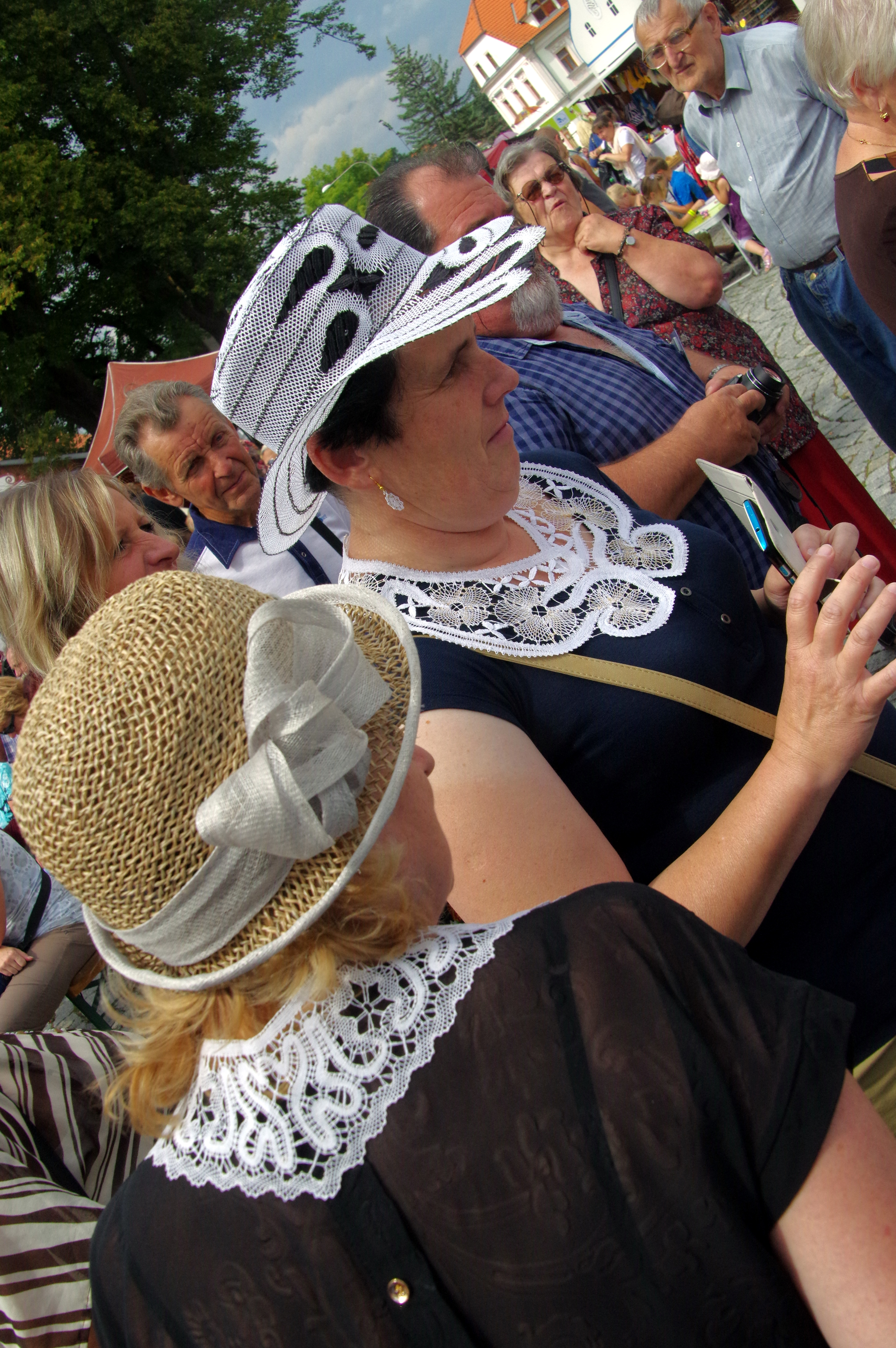
Women wearing lace collars at the Sedlice Lace Festival

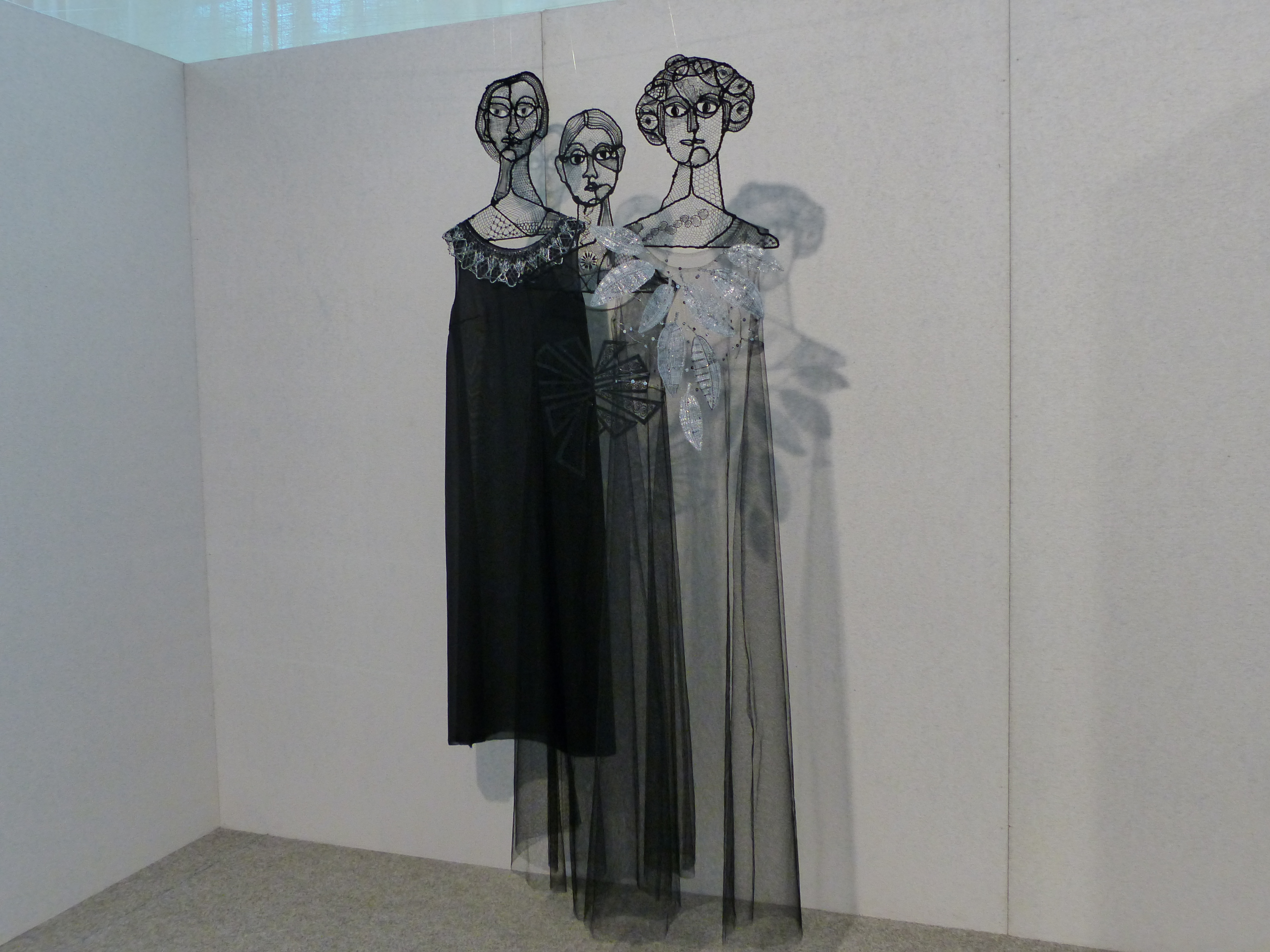
Modern bobbin lace from Vamberk

The territory of the modern Czech Republic was an important centre of lace-making. The lace textiles made there are called Czech lace or Bohemian lace, after Bohemia, the largest Czech region. It likely came to Bohemia from Italy and became a popular way of earning income, especially for rural population. Most of Bohemian lace was made in the Brussels technique and exported, but local motifs also existed. Lace-making in Bohemia declined after the widespread adoption of lace machines, but in the 20th century, handmade Czechoslovak lace became an innovative medium for artistic expression.

== Early history ==
The most famous type of Czech lace is bobbin lace, but it was preceded by the woven lace, and the earliest examples of this type of textile were found in Dolni Dunajovice date back to the 8th century. It is unknown when Czechs started making bobbin lace, but the earliest paintings depicting lace worn by Bohemians were made in the 14th century, while earliest written mentions of lace-making date back to the middle of the 16th century, in the Ore Mountains region. It is likely that bobbin lace-making came to Bohemia from Italy, via Dalmatia and Dubrovnik. In 1620, a Flemish lace maker named Magdalen Gramb settled next to the Vamberk city and taught lace-making to hundreds of local women. By the end of the 19th century, Vamberk was the most important centre of lacemaking in Bohemia.

The early lace production in Bohemia was domestic, but it was very widespread: in the 1790s, Bohemia had 14,000–18,000 lace makers working at home. This work was organised by Saxon traders, and in the 17th and 18th century some of it transformed into proto-industrial forms such as manufactures.

Many examples of early Czech lace have been preserved in synagogues: the oldest ones are simple decorative bands of gold thread bobbin lace attached to the bottom of the woven fabric like the embroidered red velvet curtain (parochet) from the Pinkas Synagogue in Prague (made in 1602) and the Torah mantle with six bands of gold thread bobbin lace (made in 1662). Both bands are made in whole stitch with picots, but the second one also includes rose ground and flower motifs The most distinctive characteristic of Jewish lace in the 18th–19th centuries is that lace can serve as one of, or even the main decorative element of a textile, instead of being used as a trimming, like in Christian paraments.

== 18th–19th centuries: growth ==
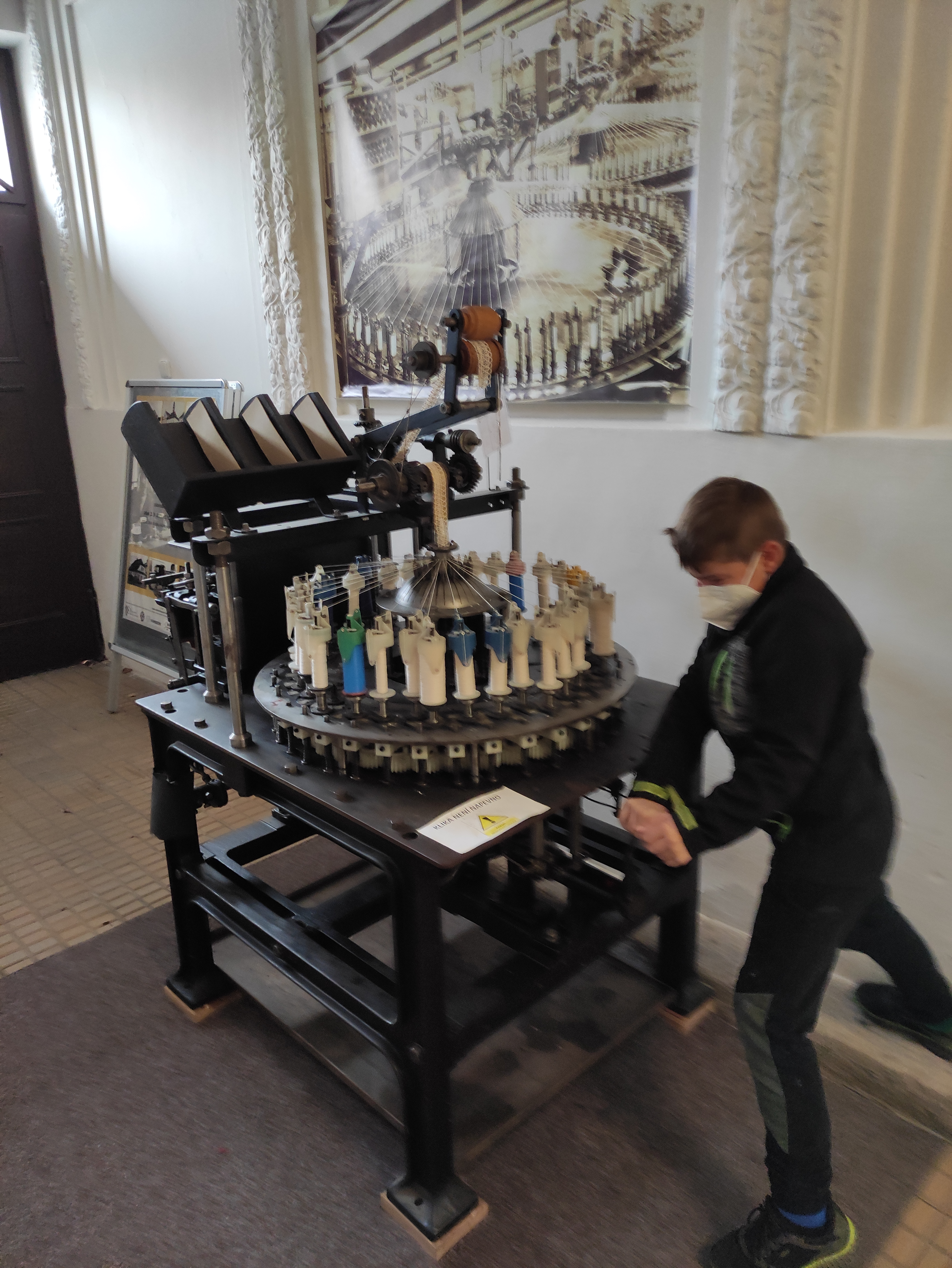
Lacemaking machine from the Vamberk lace museum

In the 18th century the bobbin lace acquires new motifs such as leaves, spiders and knots. By the 19th century lace-making reached the last Czech regions where it was ever produced; simultaneously, more and more Czech girls and women made lace at manufactures. This work often interfered with school attendance and caused health problems for younger children (some as young as 6 years old).

In the 1840s, the constant growth of the lace-making sector of the economy was halted by a production crisis. In response, the Habsburgs created an organisation tasked with supporting lace makers, Zentralkomitee zur Förderung der Erwerbstätigkeit der Böhmischen Erz- und Riesengebirge; it acquired foreign techniques and organised courses teaching new methods to Bohemian lace makers, bought and distributed new patterns among them. In the 1860s and 1870s, it also helped open so called model workshops (Musterwerkstätte) that employed local lace makers. The Royal School of Lace-making opened in Prague in 1867 and the Bohemian School of Lace-making in Vamberk in 1889.

Much of the lace made in Bohemia in the Austro-Hungarian days was sold under the name "Viennese lace" since Vienna was the capital city that controlled the production. The most popular style was Brussels lace, while the traditional Czech patterns were priced less. Lace-making remained a popular art and became an important export commodity throughout the century, especially after the success of Czech lace at the 1867 Word's Fair in Paris. In 1870s, Bohemian lace grew in demand even more due to the Franco-Prussian War, which negatively affected the French lace-making industry, so its production spread to Austrian Littoral and Carniola.

In the 19th century, most Bohemian lace makers were women and girls, but some men joined them during winter months. For many workers, especially in the rural areas, making lace of sufficient quality could provide a steady source of income: an adult worker earned 0,8–1,6 crowns per day, which reached the remuneration of workers in relatively lucrative industries, such as the construction workers and much higher than the salaries of the weavers. The main tools (bobbins, pins and a pillow) were cheap to acquire, while thread and expensive pattern books were usually supplied by the merchant.

At the end of the 19th century, machine-made lace replaced the handmade bobbin lace, including in the urban Czech costume. According to the 1902 census, Bohemia was the leading lace-making region in the Austrian Empire, with 10,726 domestic and 551 factory workers; however, these numbers only include full-time workers, while most lacemakers worked part-time. An investigation by the Viennese Directorate of Lace Courses discovered that Cisleithania alone had about 40,000 lace makers.

== 20th century: innovation and decline ==
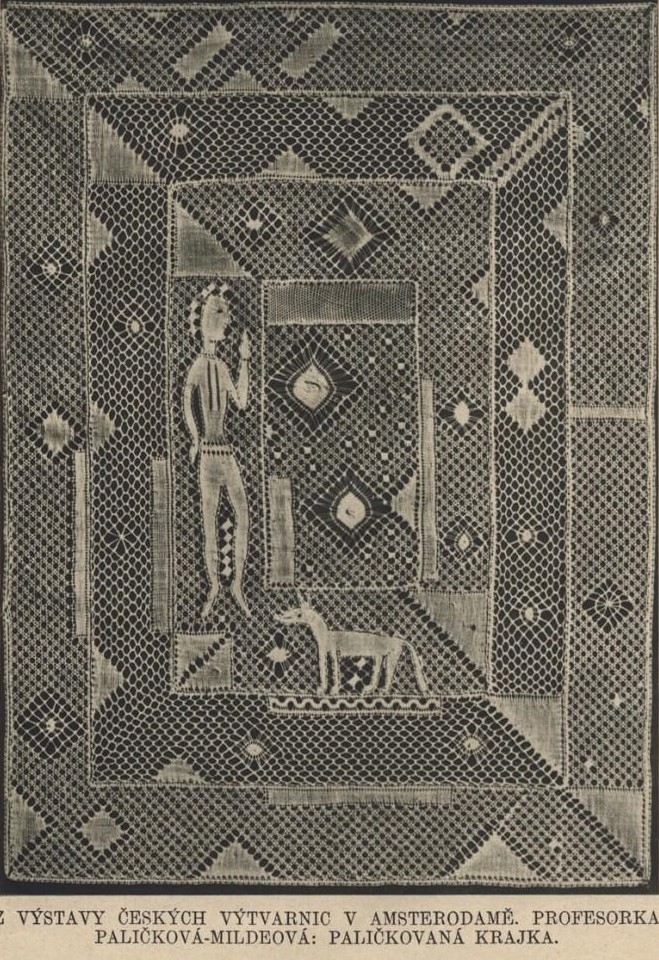
Bobbin lace by Emilie Paličková, 1929

Over the course of the 20th century, lace was picked up by artists seeking innovation. Their artworks did not have a practical purpose and served only as an expressive medium. Czech teachers and manufacturers at the Wiener Werkstätte such as Johann and Mathilde Hrdlicka and Dagobert Peche created novel lace patterns with a combination of traditional motifs with contemporary ones. More innovation occurred in the 1960s, when leading Czech lacemakers like Elena Holéczyová, Emilie Paličková, Antonín Kybal, Marie Vaňková-Kuchynková, Hana Kralová, Luba Krejčí and others incorporated abstract imagery into lace-making. The government of Czechoslovakia attempted to revitalise bobbin lacemaking by offering small groups of lacemakers a salary from the government to work on lace full time, but it continued to decline, albeit slower. Another source of income for Czechoslovak lacemakers was commissions from public organisations and local authorities.

In the 1990s, lace was still used in Czech women's folk costume, for example, as a trimming across the edge of the cap and around the neckline and hem of the dress. History of lace-making is preserved in museums such as the Vamberk museum of lace.
