= Vamberk =

- Town
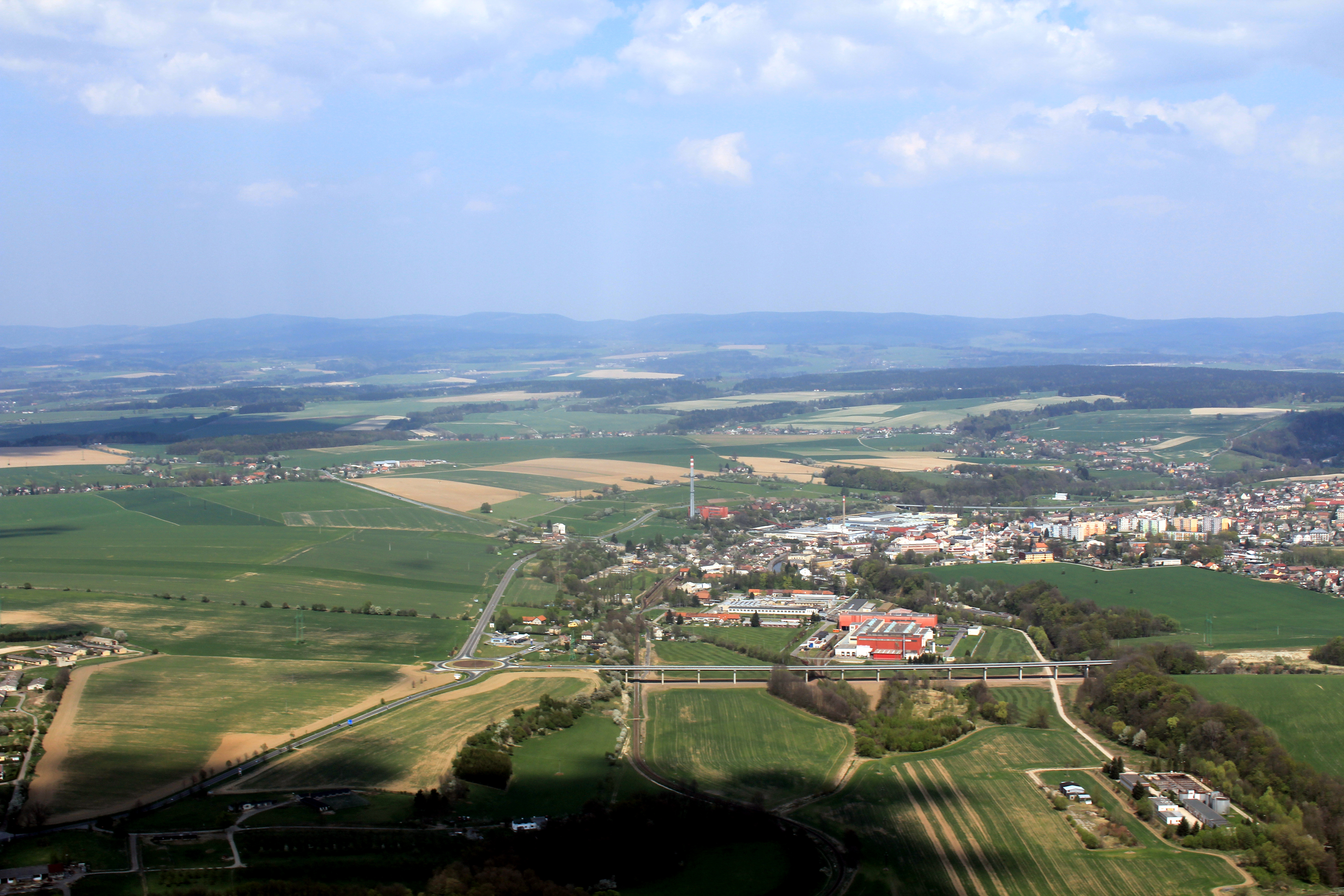
- Aerial view

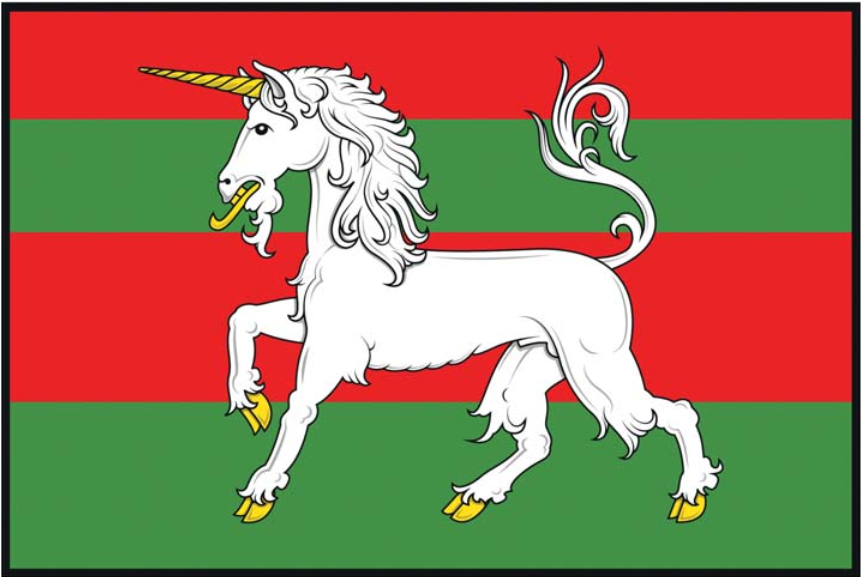
- Flag Coat of arms

- Location in the Czech Republic
- Coordinates: 50°17′33″N 16°9′45″E
- Country: Czech Republic
- Region: Hradec Králové
- District: Rychnov nad Kněžnou
- First mentioned: 1341

Government
  - Mayor: Jan Rejzl

Area
  - Total: 21.03 km^{2} (8.12 sq mi)
- Elevation: 320 m (1,050 ft)

Population (2026-01-01)
  - Total: 4,580
  - Density: 218/km^{2} (564/sq mi)
- Time zone: UTC+1 (CET)
  - Summer (DST): UTC+2 (CEST)
- Postal code: 517 54
- Website: www.vamberk.cz

Vamberk (Czech pronunciation: [ˈvambɛrk]; German: Wamberg) is a town in Rychnov nad Kněžnou District in the Hradec Králové Region of the Czech Republic. It has about 4,600 inhabitants. The town is located on the Zdobnice River, on the border between the Orlice Table and Orlické Foothills. Vamberk has a long tradition in lace production.

== Administrative division ==
Vamberk consists of three municipal parts (in brackets population according to the 2021 census):

- Vamberk (3,825)
- Merklovice (291)
- Peklo (364)

== Etymology ==
The local small castle and then the settlement were initially called Waldemberg, which was then shortened to Walmberg, and later to Wamberg, or in Czech Vamberk. It is not certain whether the origin of the name is Czech or German, because at the time of the establishment it was fashionable among the Czech nobles to give German names to castles. If the name is of Czech origin, it probably meant "Valda's hill", which was translated into German as Waldemberg. If of German origin, the name was probably derived from waldberg ('wooded hill').

== Geography ==
Vamberk is located about 5 kilometres (3 mi) south of Rychnov nad Kněžnou and 33 km (21 mi) southeast of Hradec Králové. The western part of the municipal territory lies in the Orlice Table. The eastern part lies in the Orlické Foothills and includes the highest point of Vamberk at 475 m (1,558 ft) above sea level. The Zdobnice River flows through the town.

== History ==
The first written mention of Vamberk is from 1341. In 1616, Vamberk gained town privileges. The town lived for centuries from lacemaking, weaving and the timber trade. In the late 19th and early 20th centuries, the textile, stove and meat industries developed, and Vamberk became the industrial centre of the region.

== Demographics ==
Historical population

Year	Pop.	±%
1869	4,049	—
1880	4,009	−1.0%
1890	4,146	+3.4%
1900	4,353	+5.0%
1910	5,159	+18.5%

Year	Pop.	±%
1921	4,562	−11.6%
1930	4,586	+0.5%
1950	4,057	−11.5%
1961	4,382	+8.0%
1970	4,744	+8.3%

Year	Pop.	±%
1980	5,183	+9.3%
1991	4,995	−3.6%
2001	4,815	−3.6%
2011	4,550	−5.5%
2021	4,480	−1.5%

Source: Censuses

== Economy ==
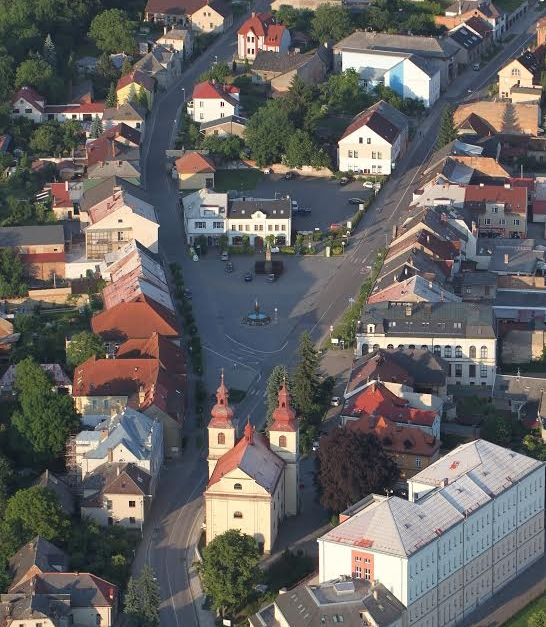
The square Husovo náměstí

Vamberk is known for the lace production. The first mention of the production in Vamberk is from 1642, but the tradition is probably older. In the mid-17th century, Magdalena of Gramb, a Belgian owner of the Vamberk estate, introduced Belgian lace patterns and a new technique of bobbin lace making using a lace cushion or pillow. Vamberk became a European centre of lace-making. The tradition continues to this day.

The largest employer based in the town is ESAB CZ, part of ESAB, the world's leading manufacturer of welding and cutting equipment and welding consumables.

== Transport ==
The town is situated at the crossroads of two main roads: I/11 from Hradec Králové to Šumperk and I/14 from Náchod to Ústí nad Orlicí.

Vamberk is located on the short railway line of local importance heading from Rokytnice v Orlických horách to Doudleby nad Orlicí.

== Sights ==
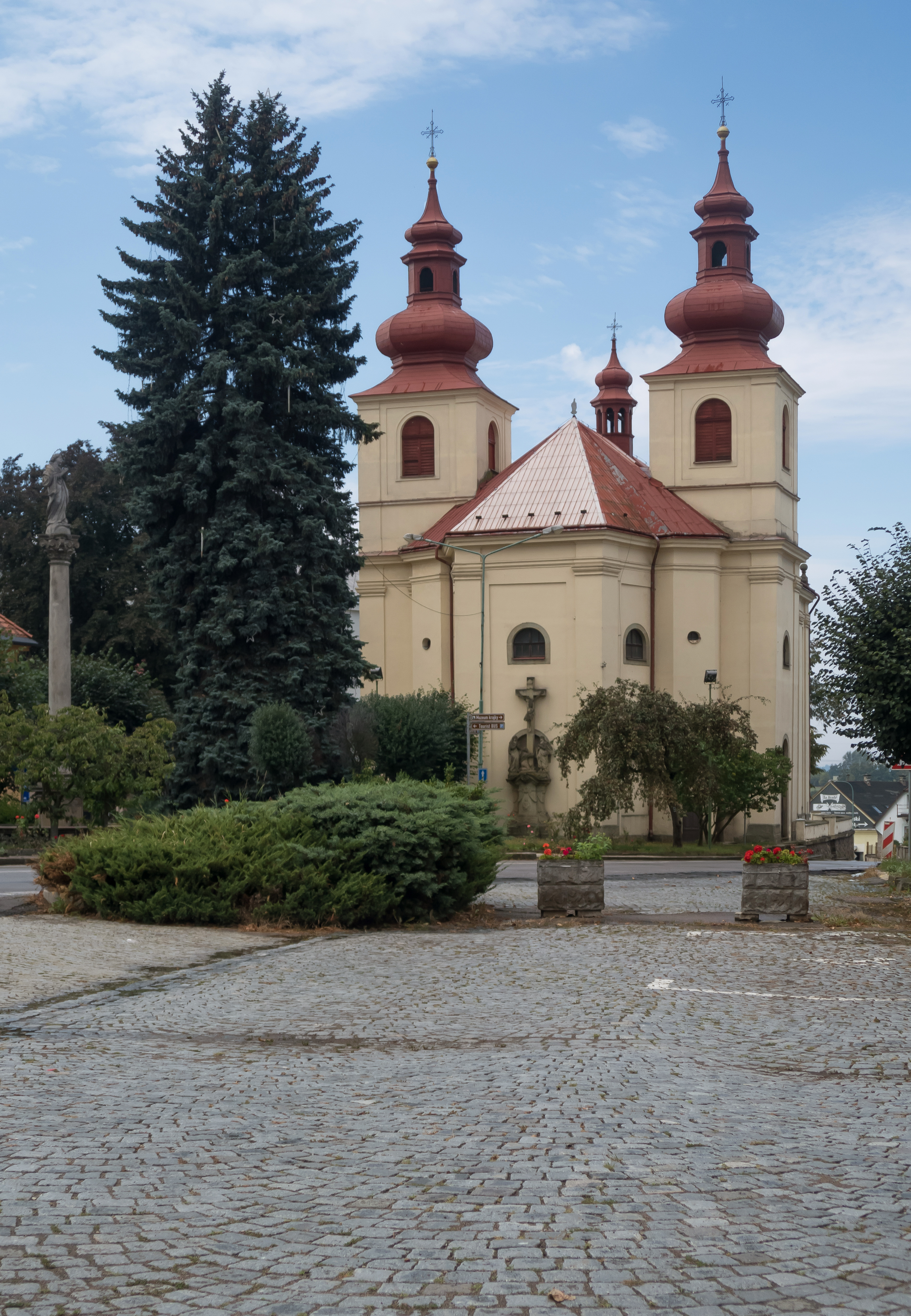
Church of Saint Procopius

The main landmark of the town is the Church of Saint Procopius. It was built in the early Baroque style in 1707–1714.

The Church of Saint Barbara was also built in the early Baroque style, in 1696–1697. It is a cemetery church. The family tomb of the Lützow family is located there.

The tradition of lace making is documented in the Lace Museum Vamberk. The museum is located in an architecturally valuable house from 1916, decorated with Art Deco elements.

== Notable people ==
- Jan Václav Voříšek (1791–1825), composer
- Josef Richard Vilímek (1835–1911), publisher
- Josef Kalousek (1838–1915), historian
