= Olešnice (Blansko District) =

- Town
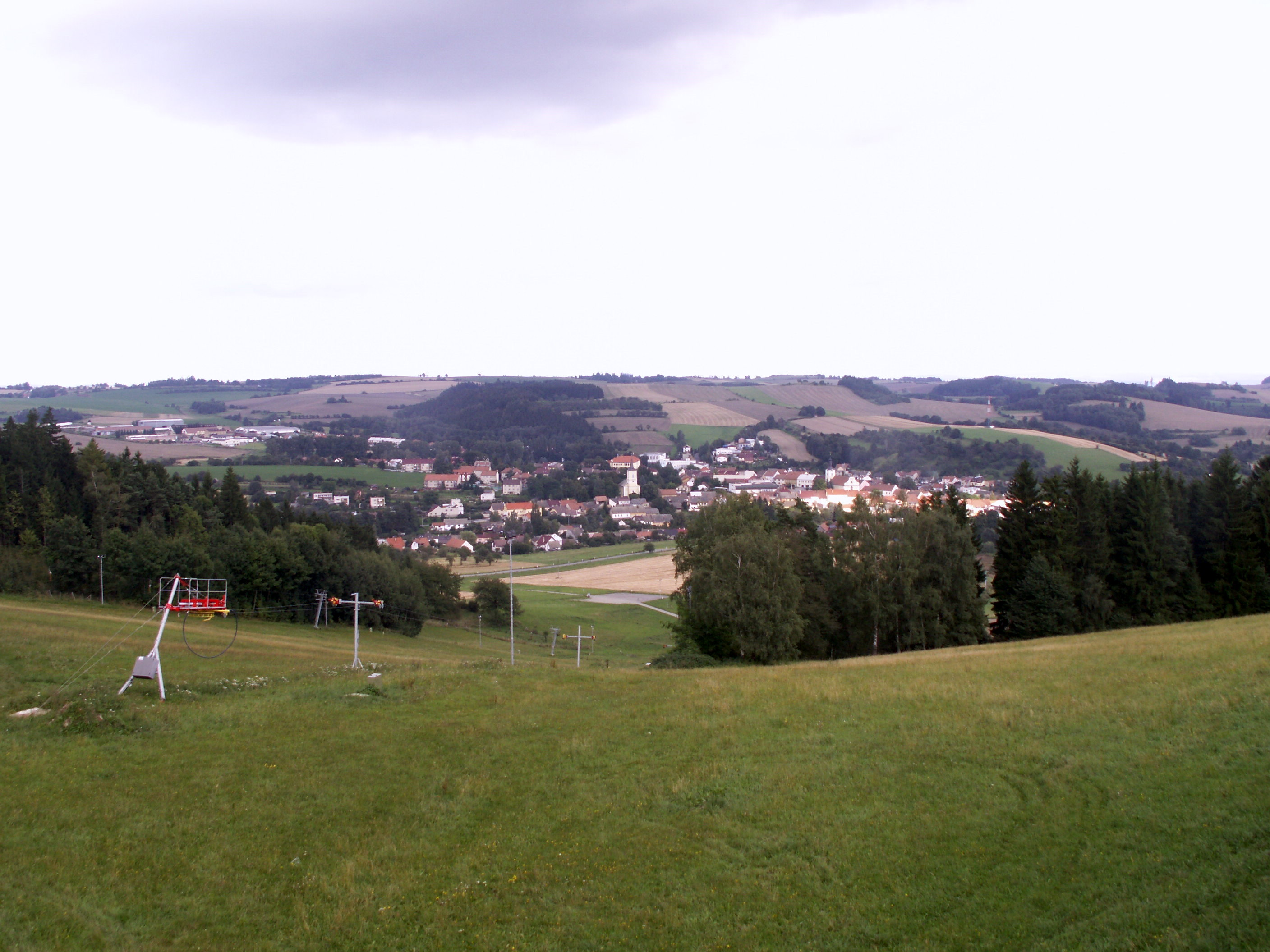
- View from the west

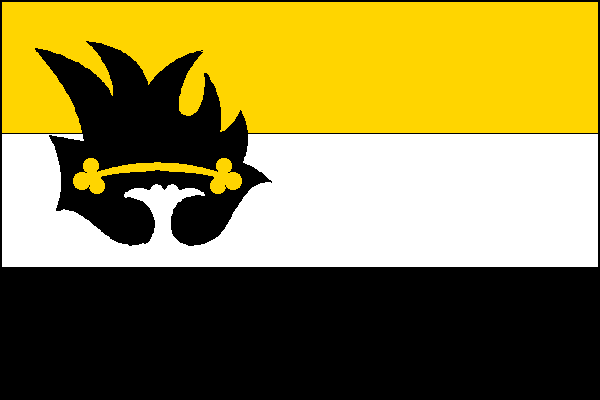
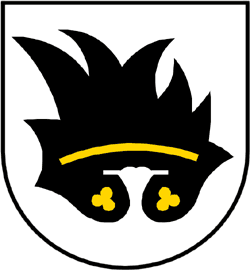
- Flag Coat of arms

- Location in the Czech Republic
- Coordinates: 49°33′27″N 16°25′18″E
- Country: Czech Republic
- Region: South Moravian
- District: Blansko
- First mentioned: 1163

Government
  - Mayor: David Tomášek

Area
  - Total: 12.52 km^{2} (4.83 sq mi)
- Elevation: 540 m (1,770 ft)

Population (2026-01-01)
  - Total: 1,610
  - Density: 129/km^{2} (333/sq mi)
- Time zone: UTC+1 (CET)
  - Summer (DST): UTC+2 (CEST)
- Postal code: 679 74
- Website: www.olesnice.cz

Olešnice (Czech pronunciation: [ˈolɛʃɲɪtsɛ]; German: Oels) is a town in Blansko District in the South Moravian Region in the Czech Republic. It has about 1,600 inhabitants.

== Geography ==
Olešnice is located about 27 kilometres (17 mi) northwest of Blansko and 39 km (24 mi) north of Brno. It lies in the Upper Svratka Highlands. The highest point is the hill Kopaniny at 688 m (2,257 ft) above sea level. The Hodonínka Stream flows through the town.

== History ==
The first written false record of Olešnice is from 1073, the document is however from 1163. During the colonisation of the Bohemian border regions in the mid-13th century, German colonists built new settlement on the east bank opposite the village Olešnice in the area of today's marketplace. The original part of the village was called Moravian Olešnice while the German part was called German Olešnice.

Olešnice was firstly part of the Louka estate and was owned by the Lords of Lomnice. During their rule in 1408, Olešnice was promoted to a town. In the 15th century, the town was acquired by the Pernštejn family and in 1560, the Louka estate was joined to the Kunštát estate. In these times, agricultural production was focused on growing flax and cereals, and eight guilds were established here. Olešnice was especially known for production of canvas.

During the Thirty Years' War, Olešnice suffered heavy damage and about 800 inhabitants left the devastated site. It became an insignificant village again. In 1742, during the War of the Austrian Succession, Olešnice was the site of a clash of the largest armies in the area. In 1759, the separate administered Moravian and German parts merged into one whole. In the second half of the 18th century, Olešnice became the centre of evangelicals.

In the beginning of the 19th century Olešnice suffered from several fires whereof the most devastating was the 1827 fire.

In 1999, Olešnice was promoted to a town.

== Demographics ==
Historical population

Year	Pop.	±%
1869	2,054	—
1880	2,163	+5.3%
1890	2,176	+0.6%
1900	2,058	−5.4%
1910	2,081	+1.1%

Year	Pop.	±%
1921	1,826	−12.3%
1930	1,782	−2.4%
1950	1,524	−14.5%
1961	1,650	+8.3%
1970	1,710	+3.6%

Year	Pop.	±%
1980	1,791	+4.7%
1991	1,778	−0.7%
2001	1,768	−0.6%
2011	1,727	−2.3%
2021	1,609	−6.8%

Source: Censuses

== Economy ==
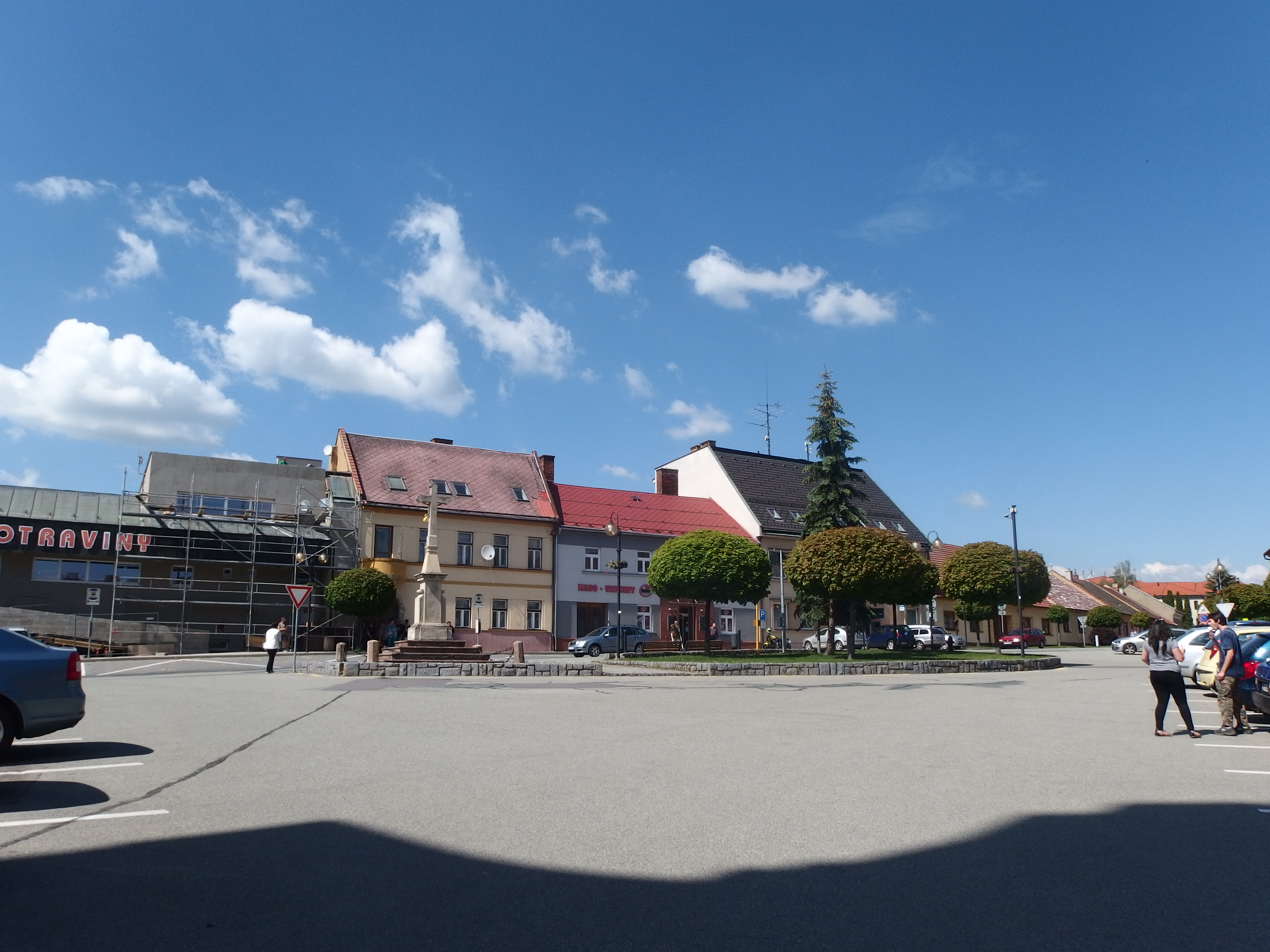
Town square

In 1816, the Danzinger family indigo dyeing workshop was established. It is the last workshop in the country that still works today. This technology has been used here unchanged since 1849 and is included in the UNESCO Intangible Cultural Heritage Lists. The tradition of dyeing here dates back to the 16th century.

== Transport ==
There are no railways or major roads passing through the municipality.

== Sights ==
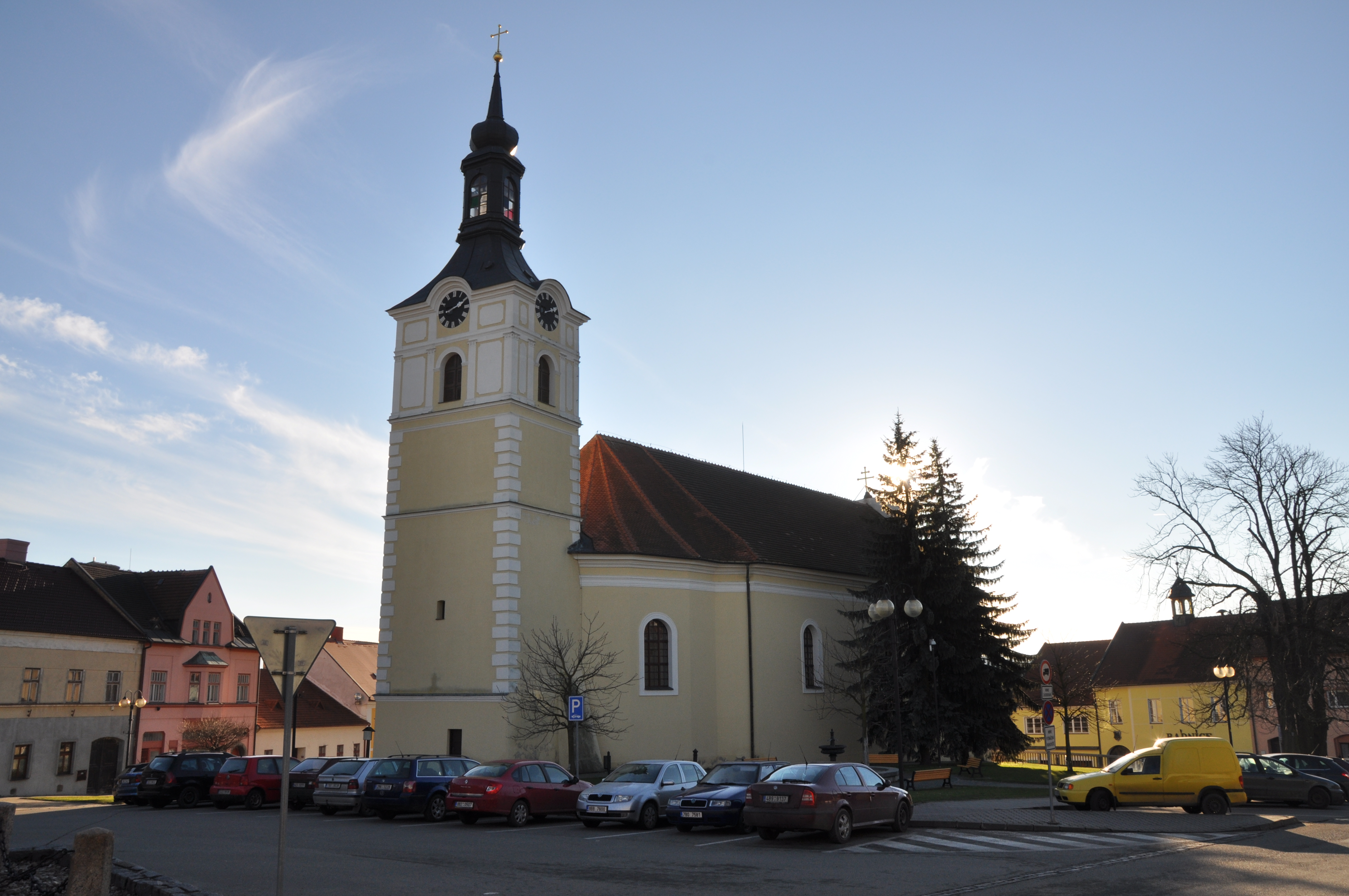
Church of Saint Lawrence

The Church of Saint Lawrence on the town square was originally a wooden church from 1391. The wooden church was burned down by the Hussites in 1424 and a new Gothic stone church was built in 1426. After the fire in 1827, the current structure was built in 1831–1839.

The Church of Saint Nicholas is a cemetery church, built in 1725 and modernised to its current form in 1852. The evangelical church is the newest one in the town, it was established in 1860–1868.

Lamberk is a small Baroque castle. It was built in around 1700. In 1733, the castle was rebuilt and created a closed complex together with the farm buildings, serving as the office of the Kunštát estate. Later the complex was inappropriately modernised into apartments, warehouses and offices.

The town hall is originally from 1794, it was rebuilt in the 1980s. Several burgher houses have also been preserved on the square.

== Gallery ==
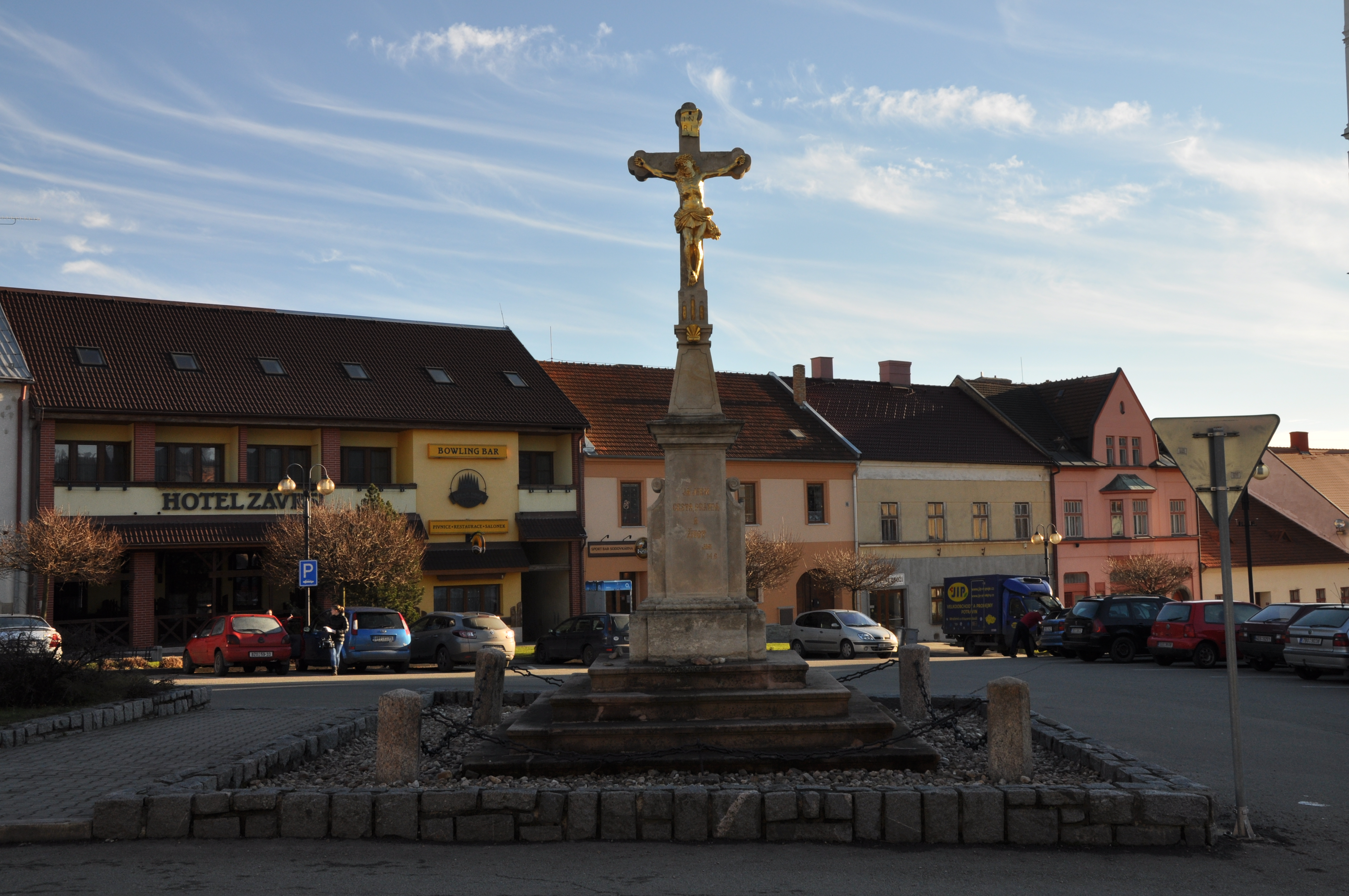
Town square

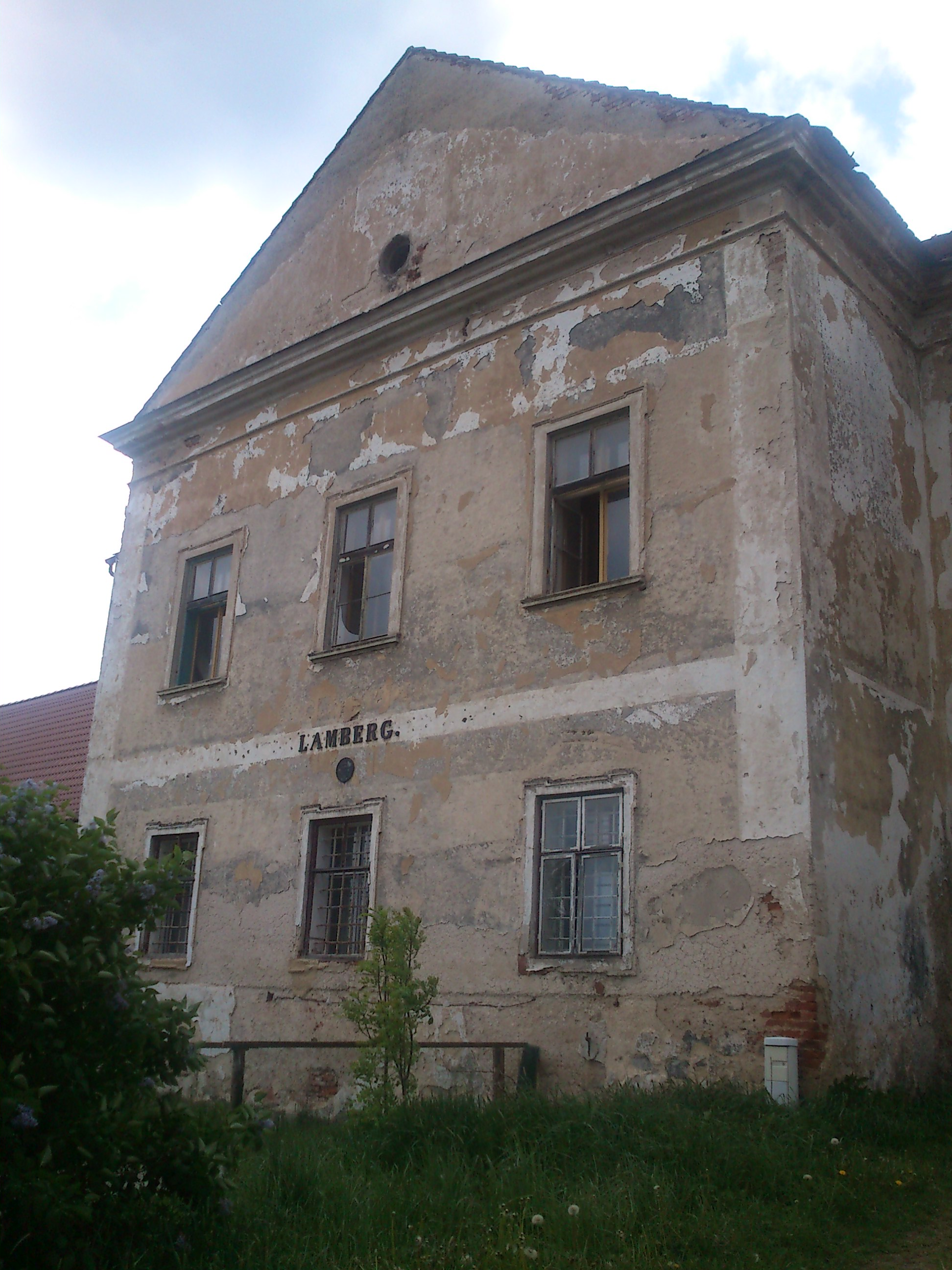
Lamberk Castle

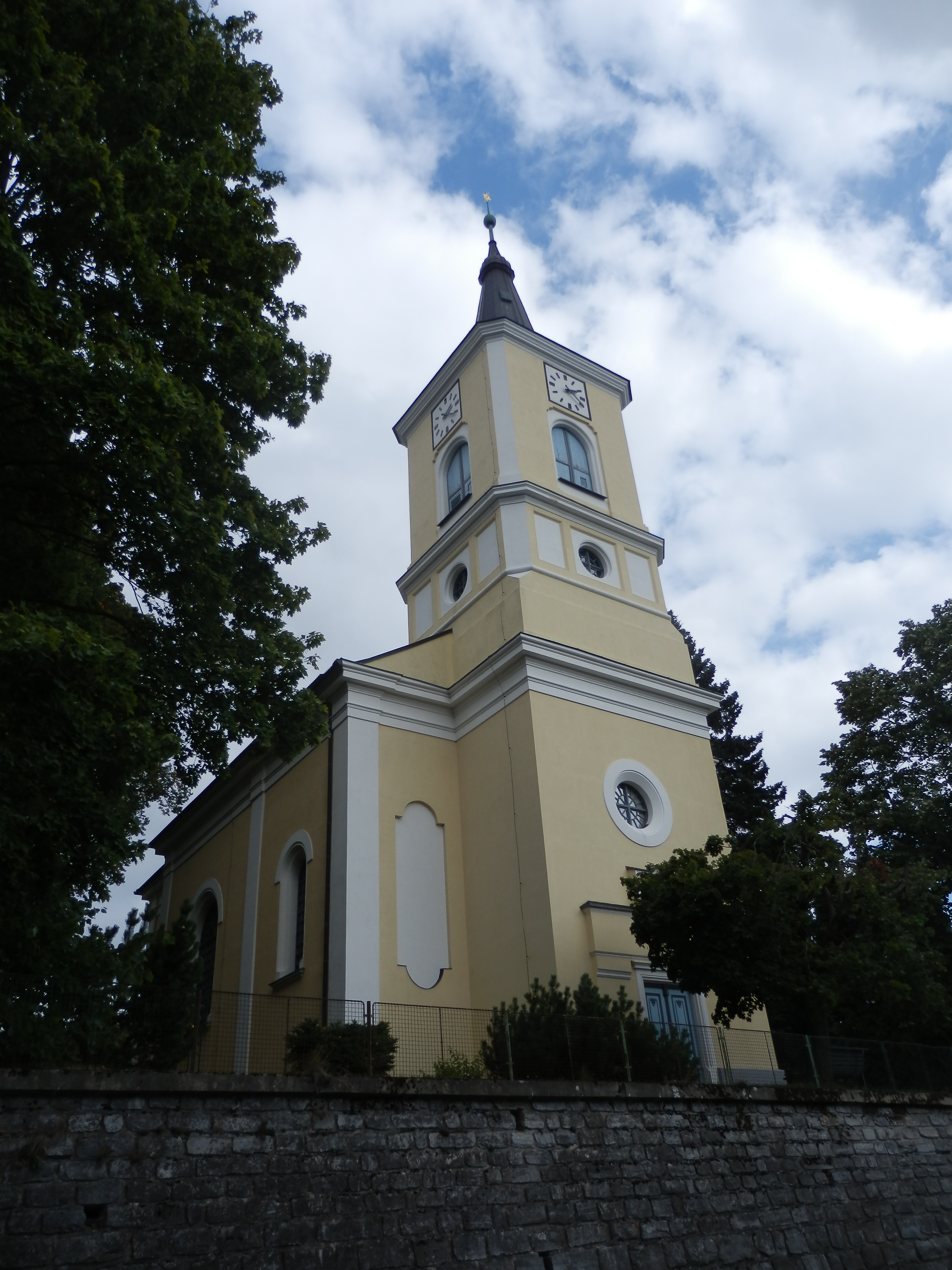
Evangelical church

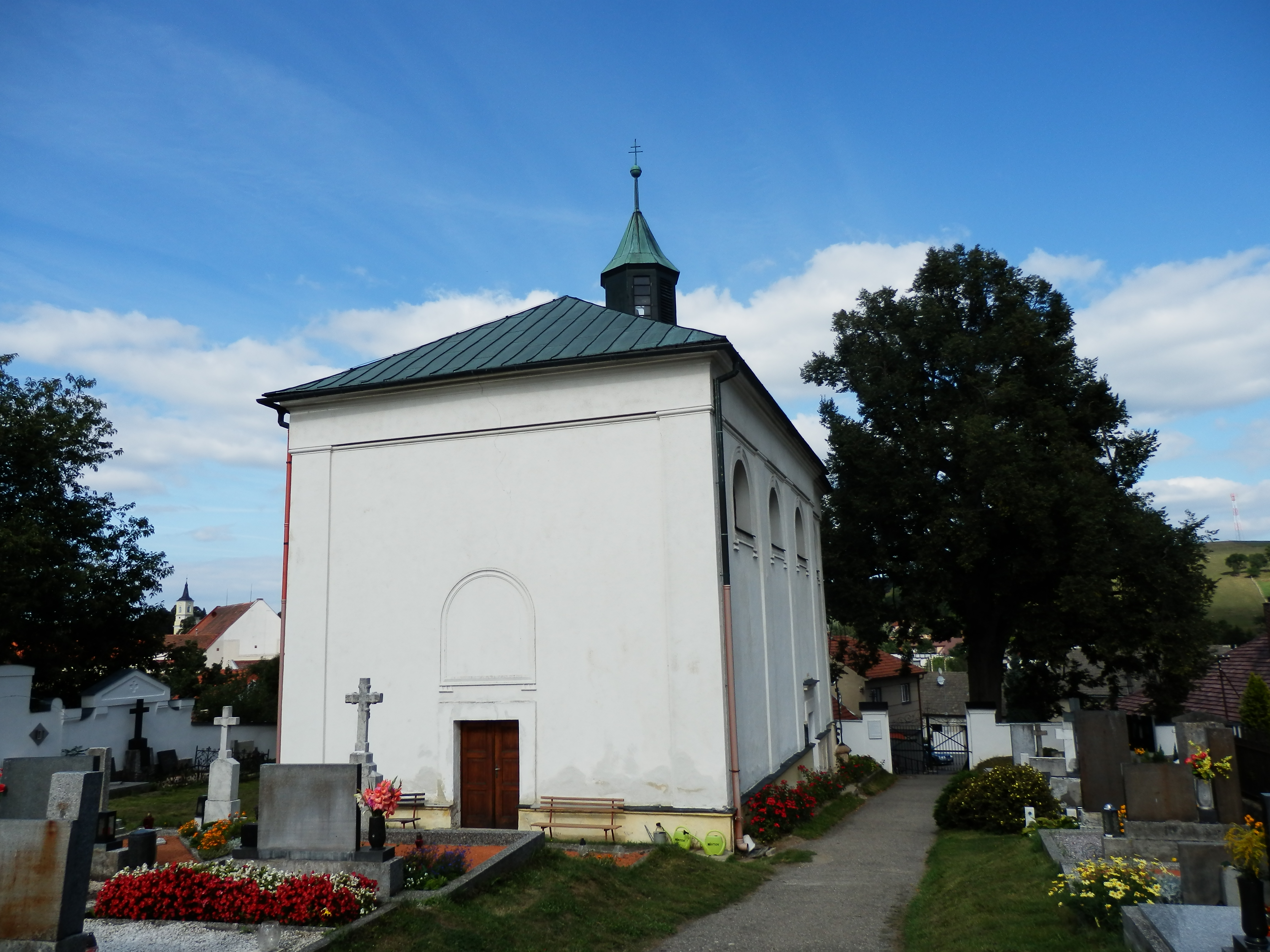
Church of Saint Nicholas
