= Zdobnice (river) =

River in Hradec Králové Region, Czech Republic

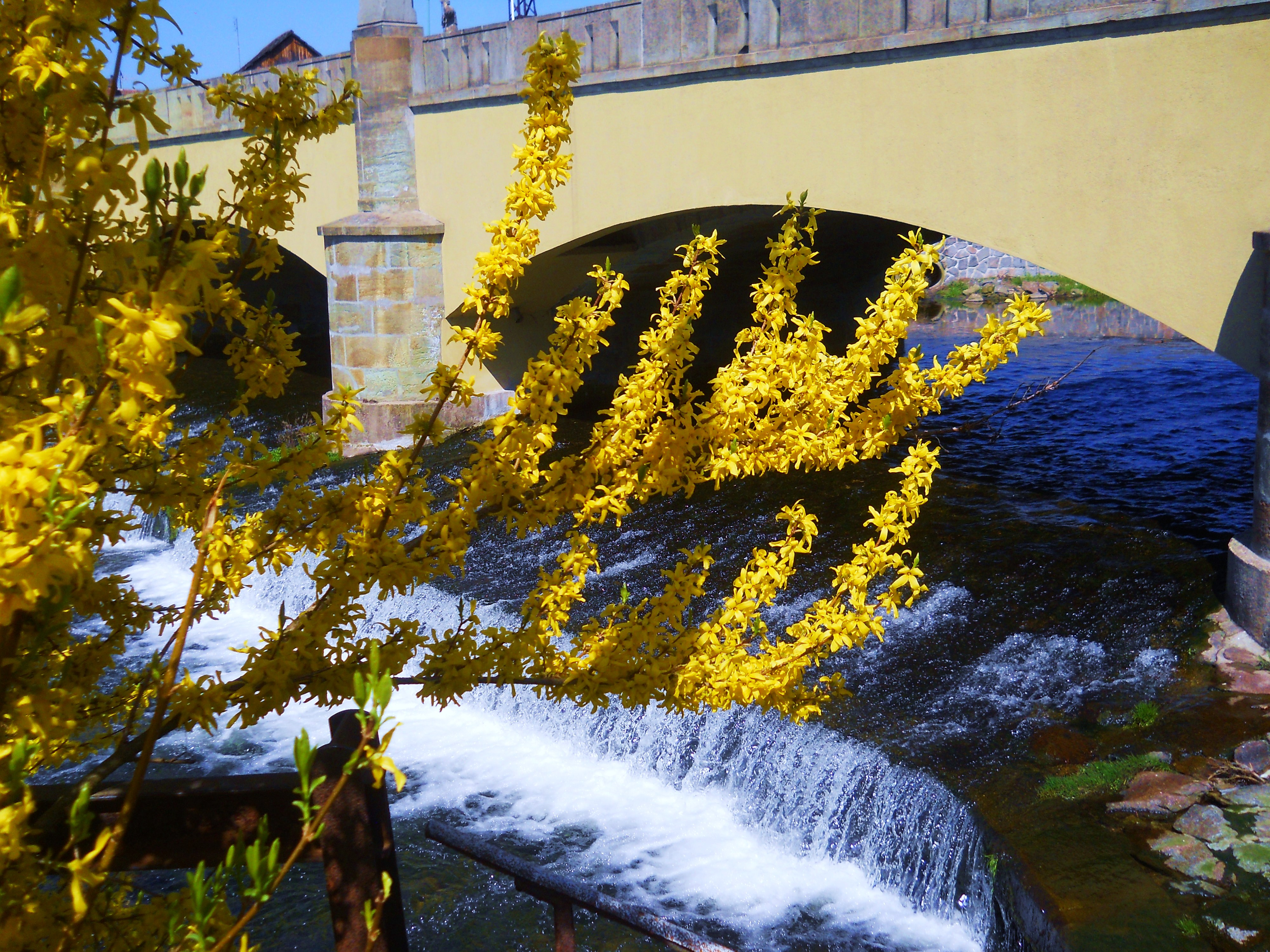
- The Zdobnice in Vamberk

Location
- Country: Czech Republic
- Region: Hradec Králové

Physical characteristics
- Source
  - location: Liberk, Orlické Mountains
  - coordinates: 50°17′52″N 16°24′30″E
  - elevation: 1,018 m (3,340 ft)
- Mouth
  - location: Divoká Orlice
  - coordinates: 50°6′12″N 16°16′30″E
  - elevation: 285 m (935 ft)
- Length: 33.9 km (21.1 mi)
- Basin size: 124.8 km^{2} (48.2 sq mi)
- Discharge
  - average: 1.87 m^{3}/s (66 cu ft/s) near estuary

Basin features
- Progression: Divoká Orlice→ Orlice→ Elbe→ North Sea

The Zdobnice (German: Stiebnitz) is a river in the Czech Republic, a right tributary of the Divoká Orlice River. It flows through the Hradec Králové Region. It is 33.9 km (21.1 mi) long.

== Etymology ==
The oldest written record of the river is from 1356, when the name was written as Wrobnitz. One theory says that the name is of Czech origin and is derived from the old Czech word zdobný, meaning 'good', 'suitable'. According to other theory, the name could be derived from the Old Prussian word stabis, which meant 'stone'. The village of Zdobnice was named after the river.

== Characteristic ==
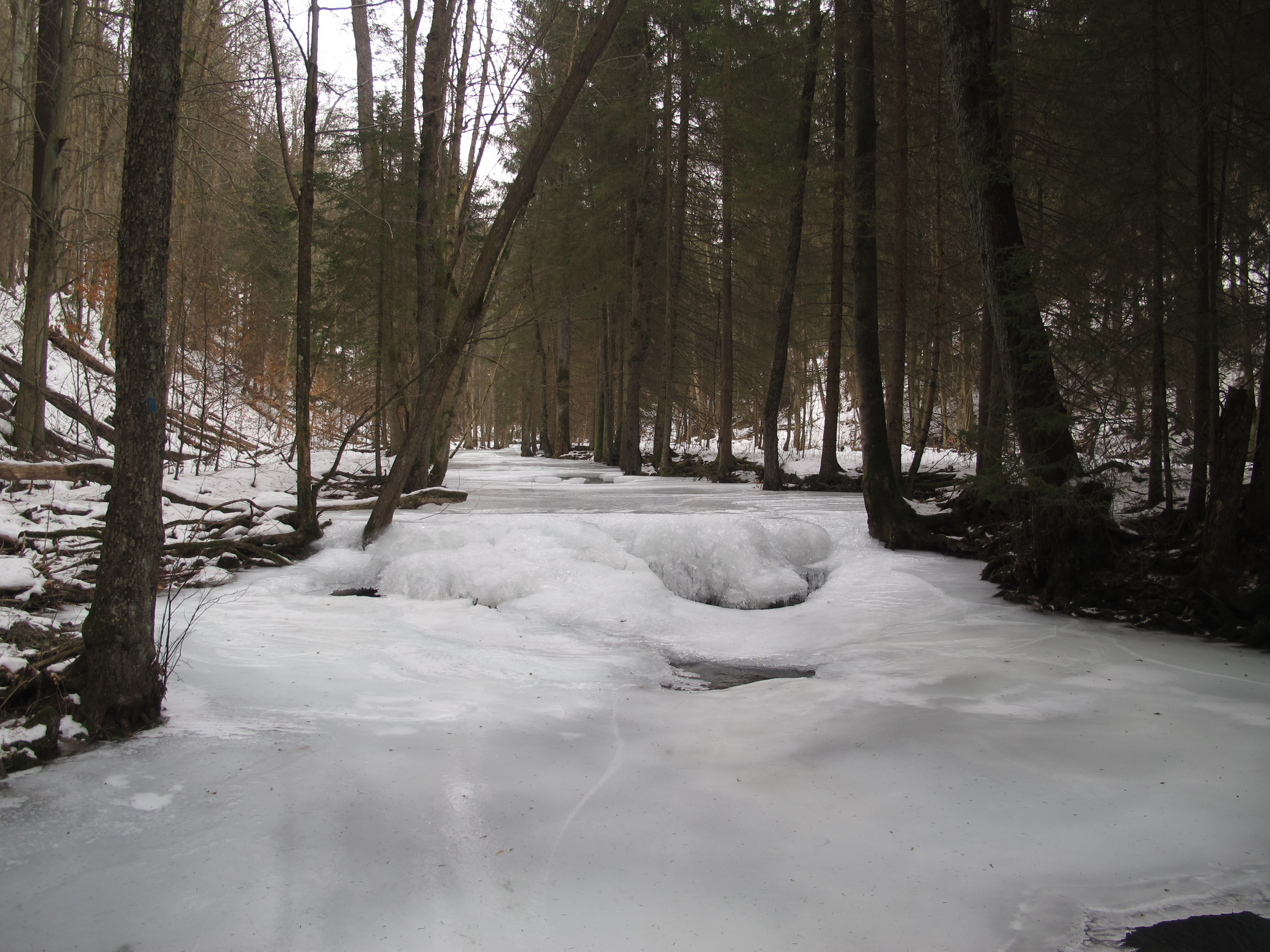
Frozen Zdobnice

The Zdobnice originates in the territory of Liberk in the Orlické Mountains below the mountain Velká Deštná at an elevation of 1,018 m (3,340 ft) and flows to Doudleby nad Orlicí, where it enters the Divoká Orlice River at an elevation of 285 m (935 ft). It is 33.9 km (21.1 mi) long. Its drainage basin has an area of 124.8 km^{2} (48.2 sq mi). The average discharge at its mouth is 1.87 m3/s.

The longest tributaries of the Zdobnice are:

Tributary	Length (km)	Side
Říčka	13.6	left
Slatinský potok	4.7	left
Čertovodolský potok	4.6	left

== Course ==
The most populated settlement on the river is the town of Vamberk. The river flows through the municipal territories of Liberk, Zdobnice, Rokytnice v Orlických horách, Pěčín, Javornice, Slatina nad Zdobnicí, Jahodov, Rybná nad Zdobnicí, Vamberk and Doudleby nad Orlicí.

== Bodies of water ==
There are no fishponds and reservoirs built directly on the Zdobnice. However, the river feed two small fishponds near Vamberk-Peklo.

The construction of the Pěčín Reservoir near the village of the same name was planned in the 2010s. It was supposed to provide drinking water in times of its deficiency. Due to the resistance of municipalities and environmental activists and due to the insufficiently proven need for this construction, it was decided in 2018 to end preparations for construction.

== Tourism ==
The Zdobnice is suitable for river tourism, but only after heavy rains or melting snow. About 26 km (16 mi) of the river is navigable.
