= Zdobnice =

- Municipality
- Church of the Good Shepherd

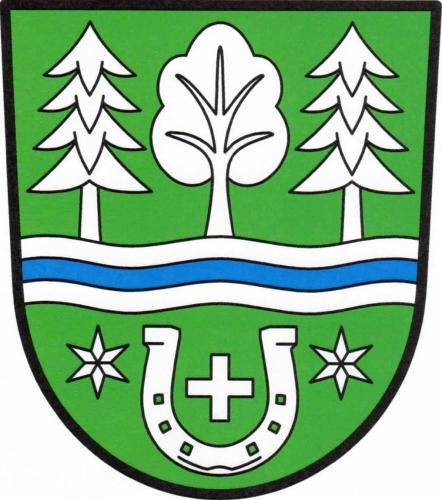
- Flag Coat of arms

- Location in the Czech Republic
- Coordinates: 50°14′19″N 16°24′31″E
- Country: Czech Republic
- Region: Hradec Králové
- District: Rychnov nad Kněžnou
- First mentioned: 1550

Area
  - Total: 33.04 km^{2} (12.76 sq mi)
- Elevation: 605 m (1,985 ft)

Population (2026-01-01)
  - Total: 184
  - Density: 5.57/km^{2} (14.4/sq mi)
- Time zone: UTC+1 (CET)
  - Summer (DST): UTC+2 (CEST)
- Postal code: 516 01
- Website: www.zdobnice.com

Zdobnice (German: Stiebnitz) is a municipality and village in Rychnov nad Kněžnou District in the Hradec Králové Region of the Czech Republic. It has about 200 inhabitants.

== Etymology ==
The settlement was named after the Zdobnice River.

== Geography ==
Zdobnice is located about 12 kilometres (7 mi) northeast of Rychnov nad Kněžnou and 40 km (25 mi) east of Hradec Králové. It lies in the Orlické Mountains. The highest point is the mountain Tetřevec at 1,044 metres (3,425 ft) above sea level. The Zdobnice River flows through the municipality.

== History ==
The first written mention of Zdobnice is from 1550. According to the parish chronicle, the village already existed in 1500, but the year could not be verified by reliable sources. Until 1569, the area was owned by the Pernštejn family. In 1569, it was acquired by Emperor Rudolf II, who started massive logging here and the area was settled by lumberjacks.

== Demographics ==
Historical population

| Year | Pop. | ±% |
|---|---|---|
| 1869 | 3,123 | — |
| 1880 | 3,133 | +0.3% |
| 1890 | 3,297 | +5.2% |
| 1900 | 2,841 | −13.8% |
| 1910 | 2,707 | −4.7% |

| Year | Pop. | ±% |
|---|---|---|
| 1921 | 2,348 | −13.3% |
| 1930 | 2,116 | −9.9% |
| 1950 | 258 | −87.8% |
| 1961 | 315 | +22.1% |
| 1970 | 288 | −8.6% |

| Year | Pop. | ±% |
|---|---|---|
| 1980 | 247 | −14.2% |
| 1991 | 184 | −25.5% |
| 2001 | 155 | −15.8% |
| 2011 | 155 | +0.0% |
| 2021 | 156 | +0.6% |

Source: Censuses

== Transport ==
There are no railways or major roads passing through the municipality.

== Sport ==
Zdobnice has a small ski resort with three ski lifts.

== Sights ==
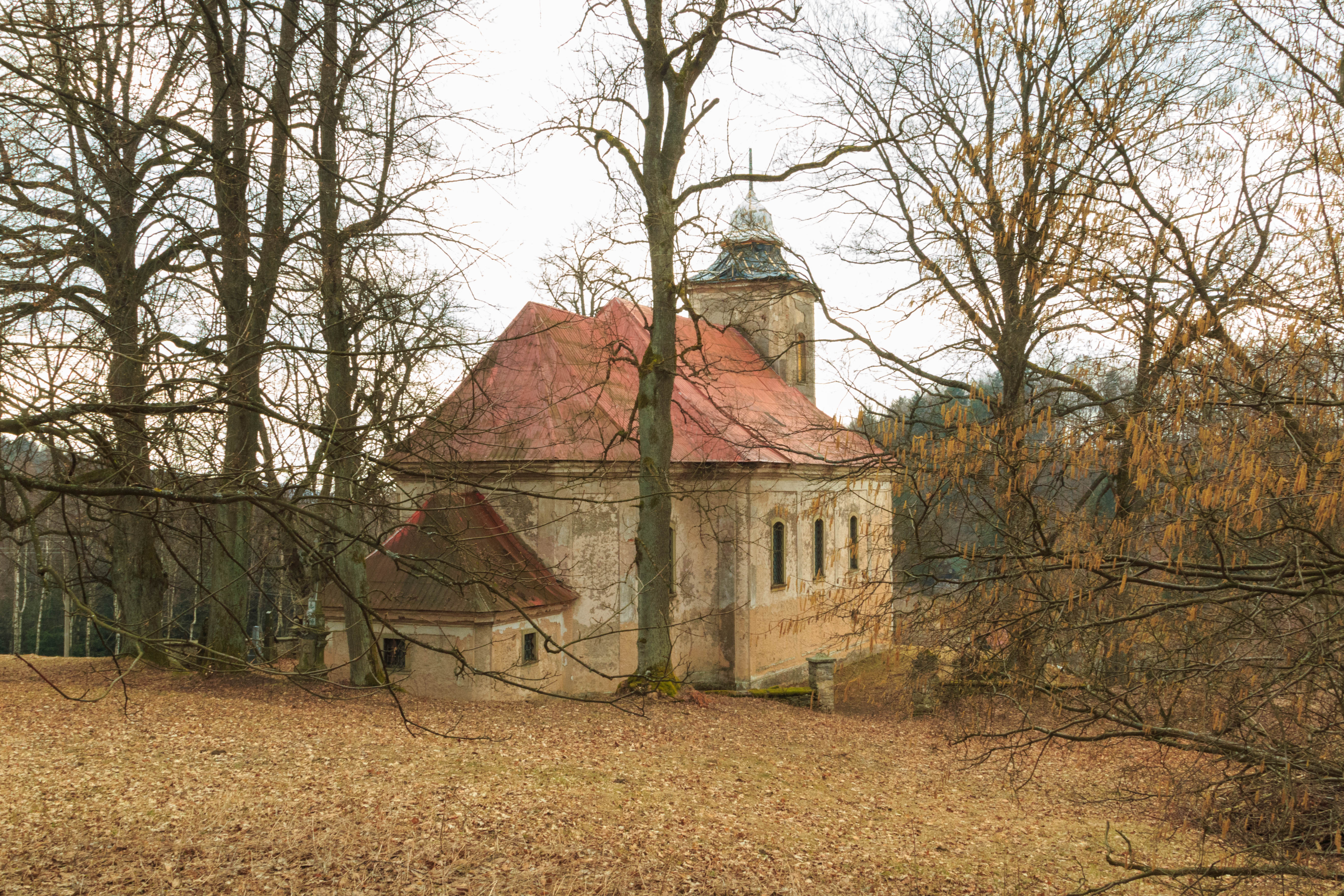
Church of Saint Catherine

The main landmark of Zdobnice is the Church of the Good Shepherd. It was built in the late Baroque style in 1787–1789.

The locality of Kačerov within the municipality has well preserved folk architecture and is protected as a village monument zone. The mainly half-timbered houses were built from the 18th until the beginning of the 20th century. In the centre of Kačerov is the Church of Saint Catherine. It was built in the late Baroque style in 1796–1798.
