= Liberk =

- Municipality
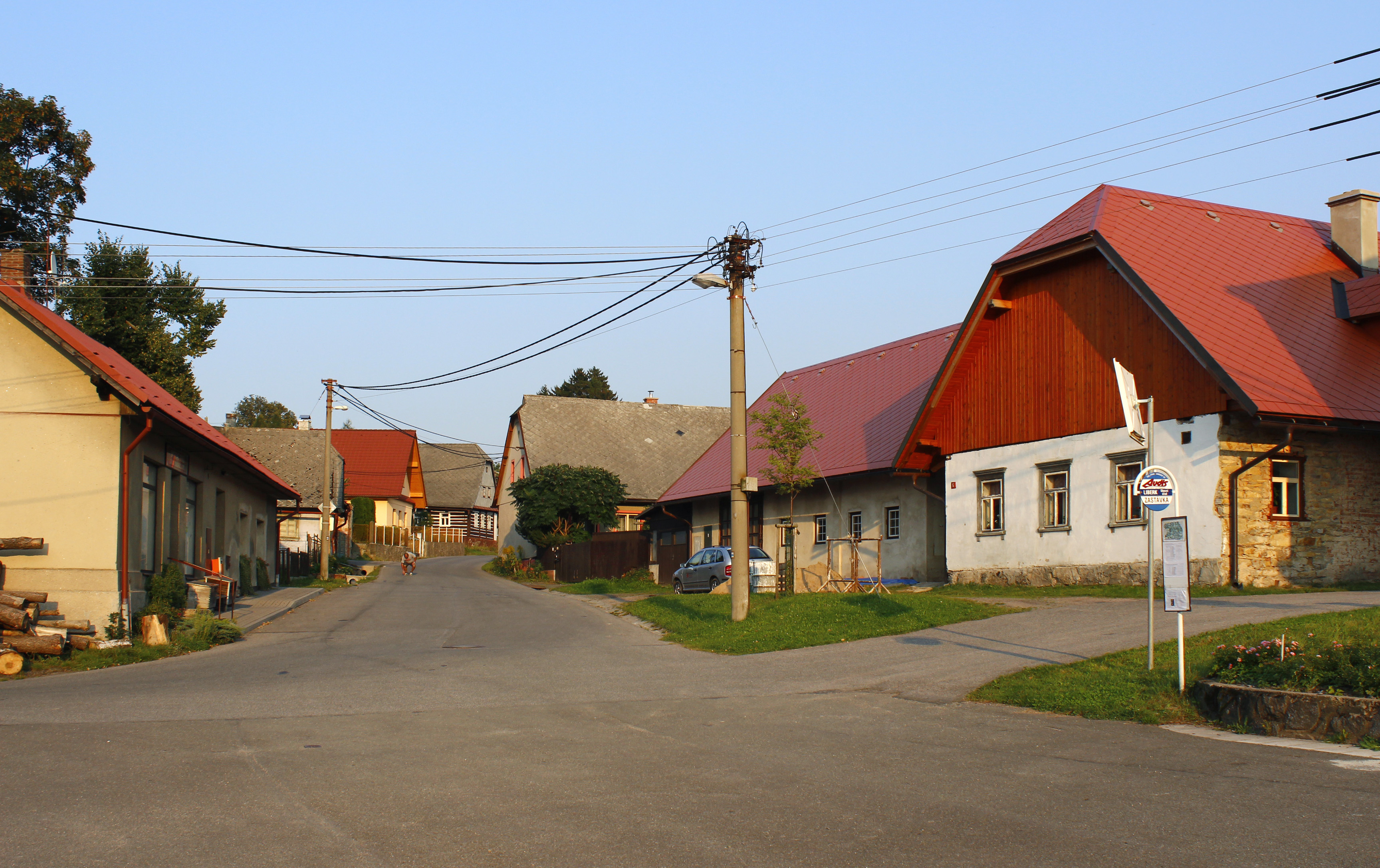
- Lower common in Liberk

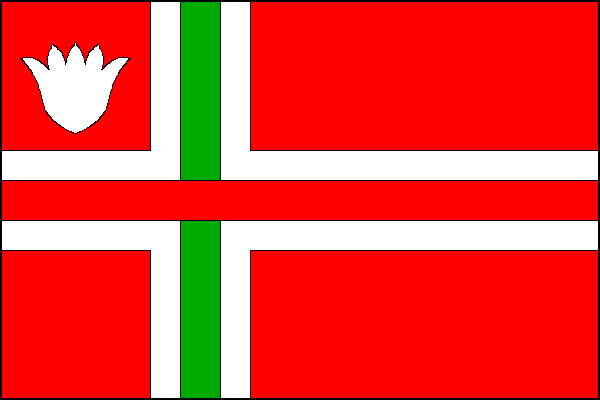
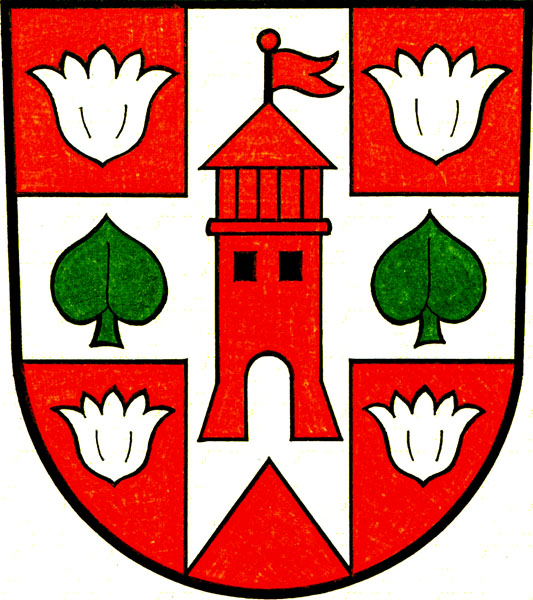
- Flag Coat of arms

- Location in the Czech Republic
- Coordinates: 50°11′57″N 16°20′35″E
- Country: Czech Republic
- Region: Hradec Králové
- District: Rychnov nad Kněžnou
- Founded: 1310

Area
  - Total: 54.06 km^{2} (20.87 sq mi)
- Elevation: 455 m (1,493 ft)

Population (2026-01-01)
  - Total: 690
  - Density: 13/km^{2} (33/sq mi)
- Time zone: UTC+1 (CET)
  - Summer (DST): UTC+2 (CEST)
- Postal codes: 516 01, 517 03, 517 12
- Website: www.obec-liberk.cz

Liberk is a municipality and village in Rychnov nad Kněžnou District in the Hradec Králové Region of the Czech Republic. It has about 700 inhabitants. It is known for the wooden Church of Saints Peter and Paul, which is protected as a national cultural monument.

== Administrative division ==
Liberk consists of six municipal parts (in brackets population according to the 2021 census):

- Liberk (193)
- Bělá (87)
- Hláska (159)
- Prorubky (62)
- Rampuše (42)
- Uhřínov (143)

== Etymology ==
The village was founded next to a castle that was originally called Richenberg ('rich castle' in German). It was founded at a time when German names for castles were fashionable. The village was named after the castle, but the Czech inhabitants gradually distorted the name to Richenberk, Richberk, Riberk and finally to Liberk.

== Geography ==
Liberk is located about 6 kilometres (4 mi) northeast of Rychnov nad Kněžnou and 35 km (22 mi) east of Hradec Králové. It lies mostly in the Orlické Foothills, only the northeastern part of the elongated municipal territory extends into the Orlické Mountains. The highest point is the mountain Koruna at 1,101 m (3,612 ft) above sea level. The Zdobnice River originates in the municipal territory. The Bělá River flows along the northwestern municipal border.

== History ==
The first written mention of Liberk is from 1310. The village belonged to the Rychmberk estate, until the Rychmberk castle was destroyed in 1457.

== Demographics ==
Historical population

Year	Pop.	±%
1869	4,047	—
1880	4,067	+0.5%
1890	4,078	+0.3%
1900	3,706	−9.1%
1910	3,361	−9.3%

Year	Pop.	±%
1921	3,061	−8.9%
1930	2,718	−11.2%
1950	792	−70.9%
1961	816	+3.0%
1970	878	+7.6%

Year	Pop.	±%
1980	707	−19.5%
1991	724	+2.4%
2001	699	−3.5%
2011	652	−6.7%
2021	686	+5.2%

Source: Censuses

== Transport ==
There are no railways or major roads passing through the municipality.

== Sights ==
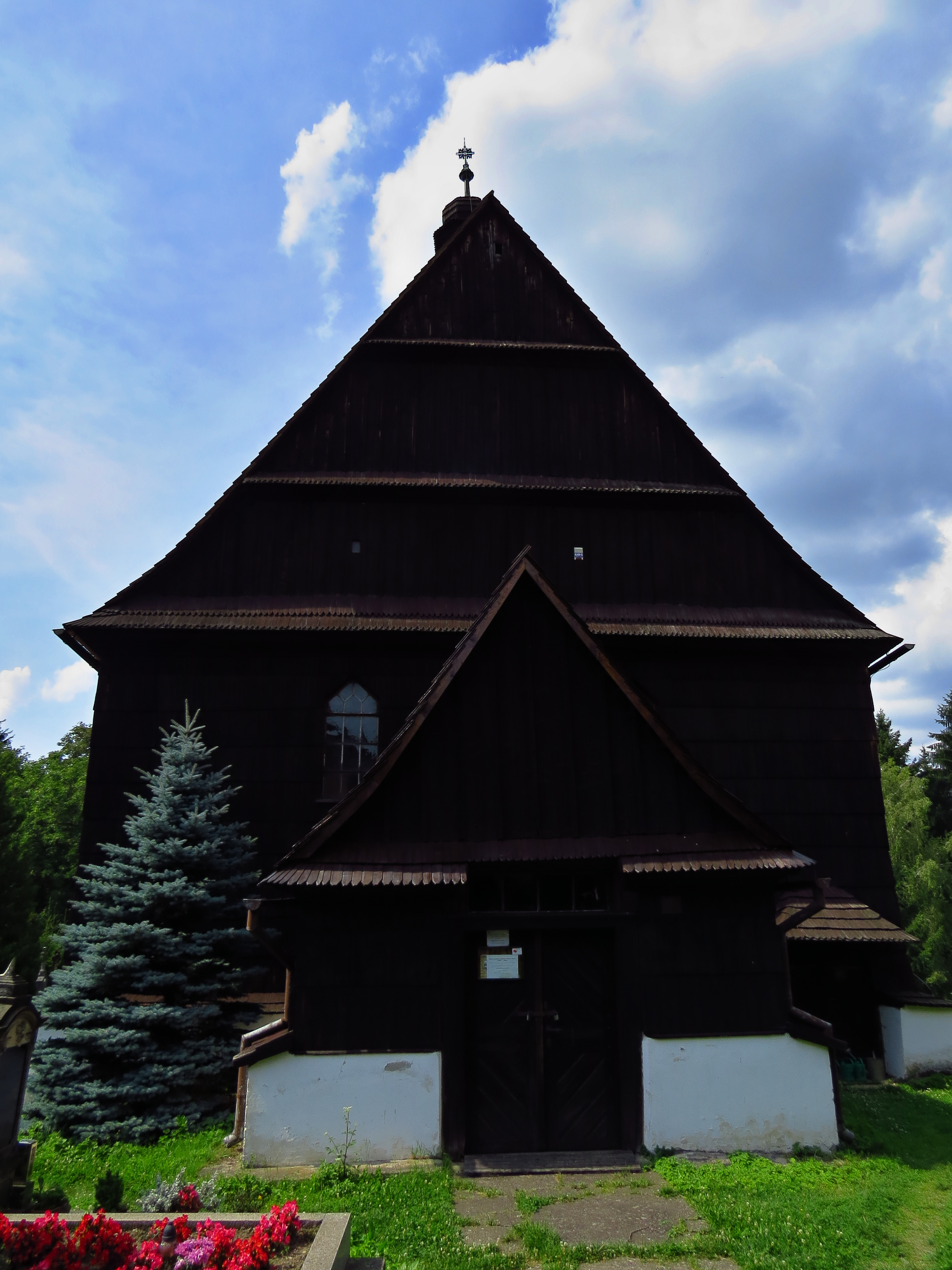
Church of Saints Peter and Paul

The main landmark of Liberk is the Church of Saints Peter and Paul. It is a wooden church, built in the early Baroque style in 1691–1696. Next to the church is a separate wooden bell tower. Near the church is a wooden rectory from the mid-19th century. The entire valuable church complex is protected as a national cultural monument.

The Church of Saint John of Nepomuk is located in Bělá. It was built in the Baroque style in 1734–1736, on the site of an older chapel. Next to the church is also a separate wooden bell tower.

The Church of Saint Lawrence is located in Uhřínov. It was built in the Baroque style in 1752–1755.

The ruin of the Rychmberk Castle is situated on the western edge of the Liberk village. The castle was probably built at the end of the 13th century and conquered in 1457. In 1495, it was described as abandoned. The landscaping, part of the outer fortifications and a bastion have survived to this day. The site is also an archaeological site with finds from around 1000–560 BC.
