= Rybná nad Zdobnicí =

- Municipality
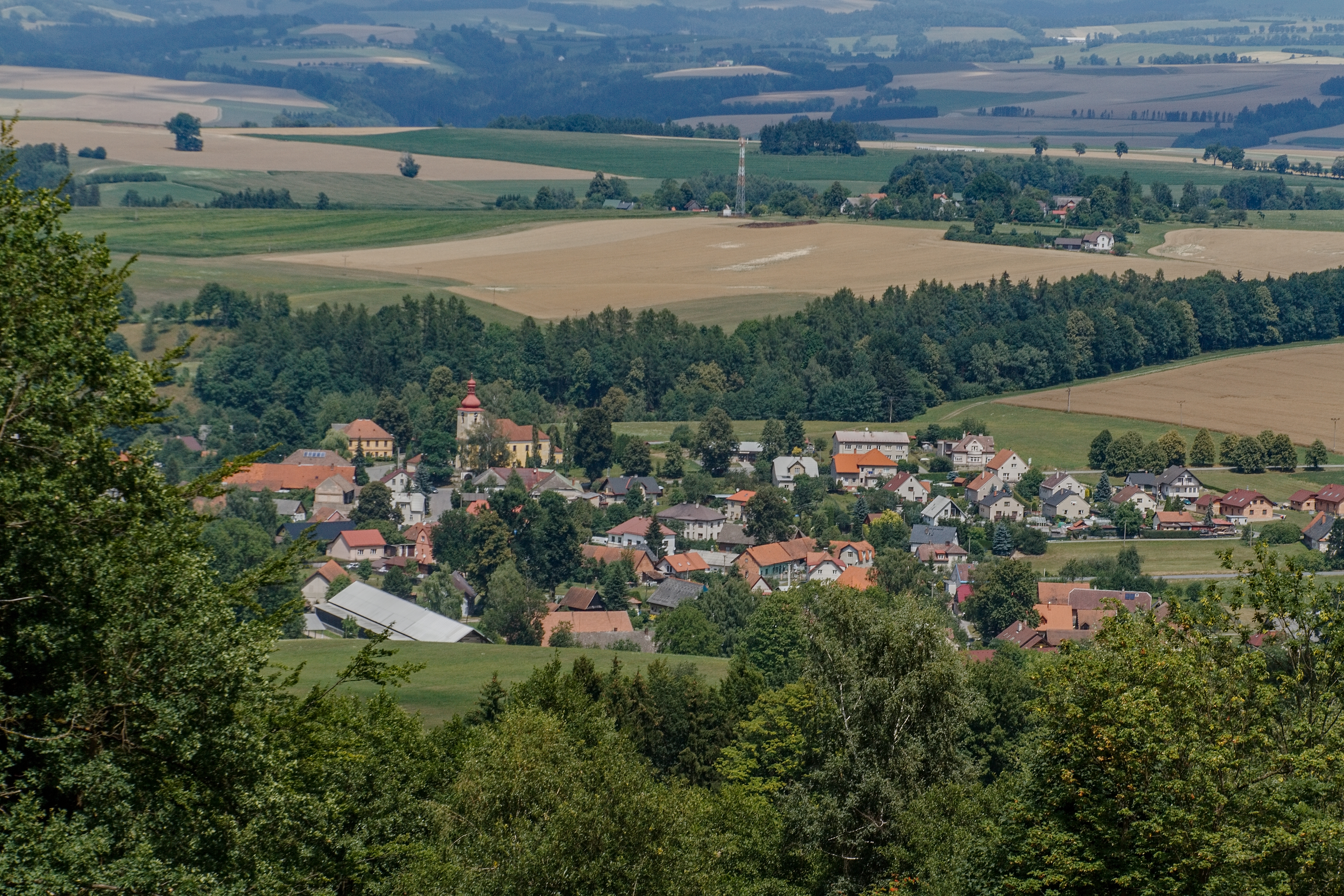
- Rybná nad Zdobnicí

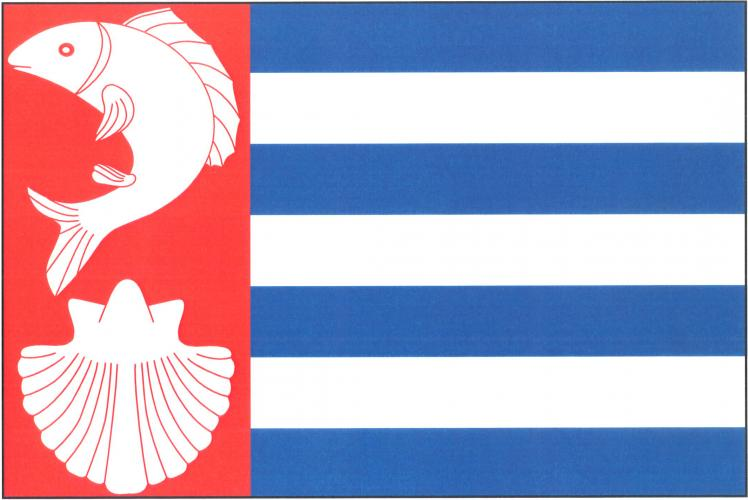
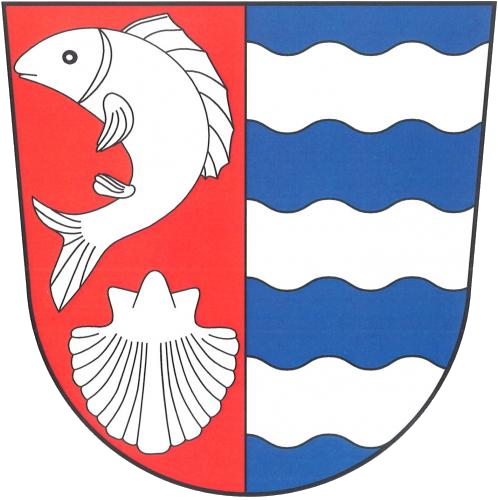
- Flag Coat of arms

- Location in the Czech Republic
- Coordinates: 50°6′31″N 16°21′57″E
- Country: Czech Republic
- Region: Hradec Králové
- District: Rychnov nad Kněžnou
- First mentioned: 1354

Area
  - Total: 9.17 km^{2} (3.54 sq mi)
- Elevation: 405 m (1,329 ft)

Population (2026-01-01)
  - Total: 400
  - Density: 44/km^{2} (110/sq mi)
- Time zone: UTC+1 (CET)
  - Summer (DST): UTC+2 (CEST)
- Postal code: 517 55
- Website: obec.rybna.cz

Rybná nad Zdobnicí (until 1945 Německá Rybná; German: Deutsch Rybna) is a municipality and village in Náchod District in the Hradec Králové Region of the Czech Republic. It has about 400 inhabitants.

== Etymology ==
The name Rybná was derived from rybník, i.e. 'fishpond'. It refers to a time when the area was full of ponds and swamps. Until 1945, the village was called Německá Rybná ('German Rybná'), which meant that it was settled under German law. Between 1945 and 1947, the municipality was named Orlická Rybná, and since 1947, it has its current name, referring to the nearby Zdobnice River.

== Geography ==
Rybná nad Zdobnicí is located about 8 kilometres (5 mi) southeast of Rychnov nad Kněžnou and 38 km (24 mi) southeast of Hradec Králové. It lies in the Orlické Foothills. The highest point is at 588 m (1,929 ft) above sea level. The stream Rybenský potok flows through the municipality. The stream is a tributary of the Zdobnice River, which forms the northern municipal border.

== History ==
The first written mention of Rybná is from 1354. The village was probably founded around 1260. Rybná belonged to the Litice estate and shared its destinies and owners, which included the Poděbrady family and the Pernštejn family. In 1563, it was acquired by the Lords of Bubna of Litice, who owned it until 1809. In 1809–1815, it was in possession of the Windisch-Graetz family. The last aristocratic owners were the Parish family.

== Demographics ==
Historical population

Year	Pop.	±%
1869	934	—
1880	906	−3.0%
1890	1,001	+10.5%
1900	957	−4.4%
1910	896	−6.4%

Year	Pop.	±%
1921	818	−8.7%
1930	790	−3.4%
1950	625	−20.9%
1961	624	−0.2%
1970	550	−11.9%

Year	Pop.	±%
1980	513	−6.7%
1991	455	−11.3%
2001	435	−4.4%
2011	422	−3.0%
2021	414	−1.9%

Source: Censuses

== Transport ==
The I/11 road from Hradec Králové to Šumperk runs through the municipality.

The train station Rybná nad Zdobnicí is located on the railway line of local importance Rokytnice v Orlických horách–Týniště nad Orlicí. However, it is located just outside the municipality.

== Culture ==
The municipality annually organises the music festival Rybenské hudební léto ("Rybná musical summer") with concerts and recitation of poems. It was first held in 2006.

== Sights ==
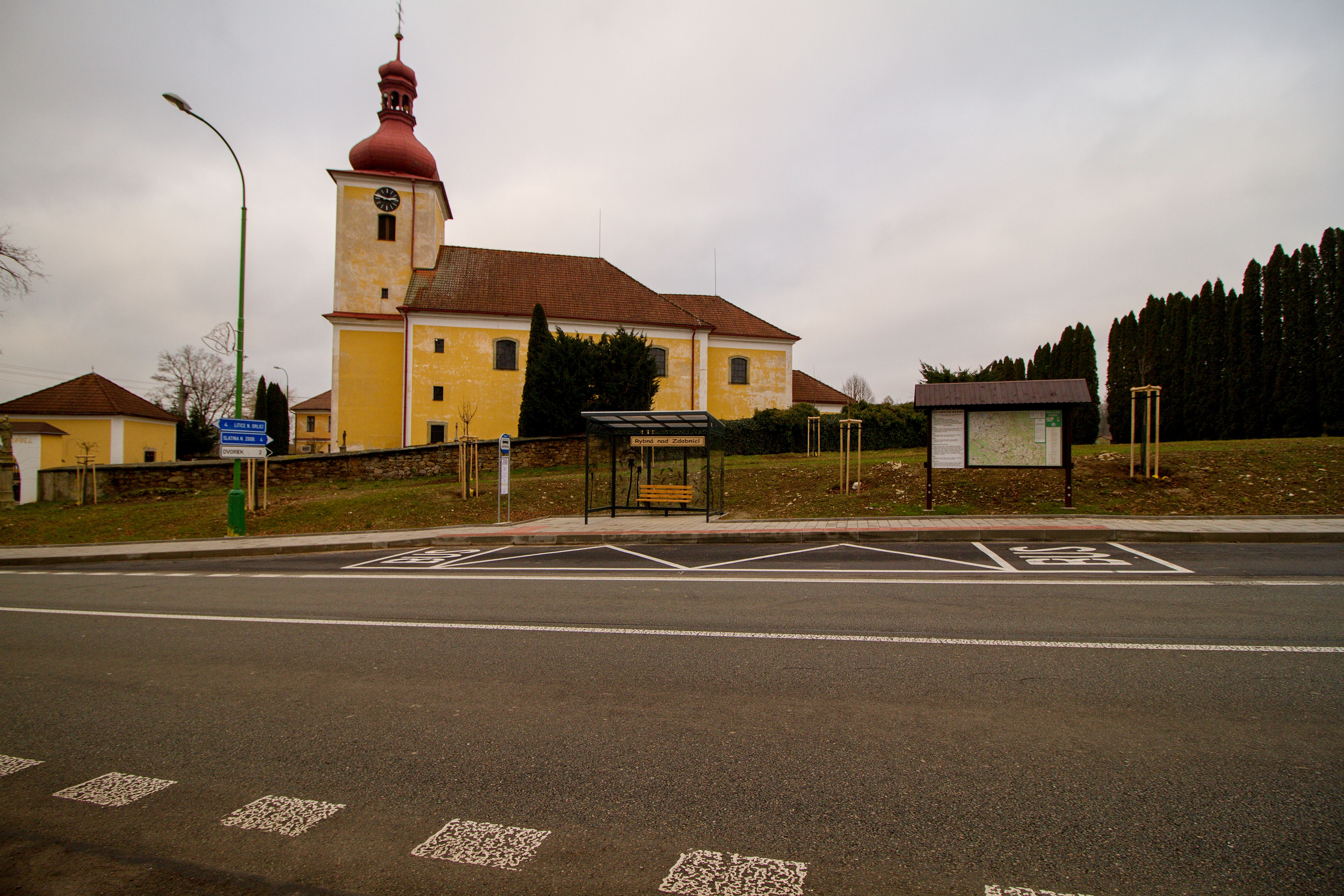
Church of Saint James the Great

The main landmark of Rybná nad Zdobnicí is the Church of Saint James the Great. It was built in 1748. The rectory is from 1848.
