= Deštné v Orlických horách =

- Municipality
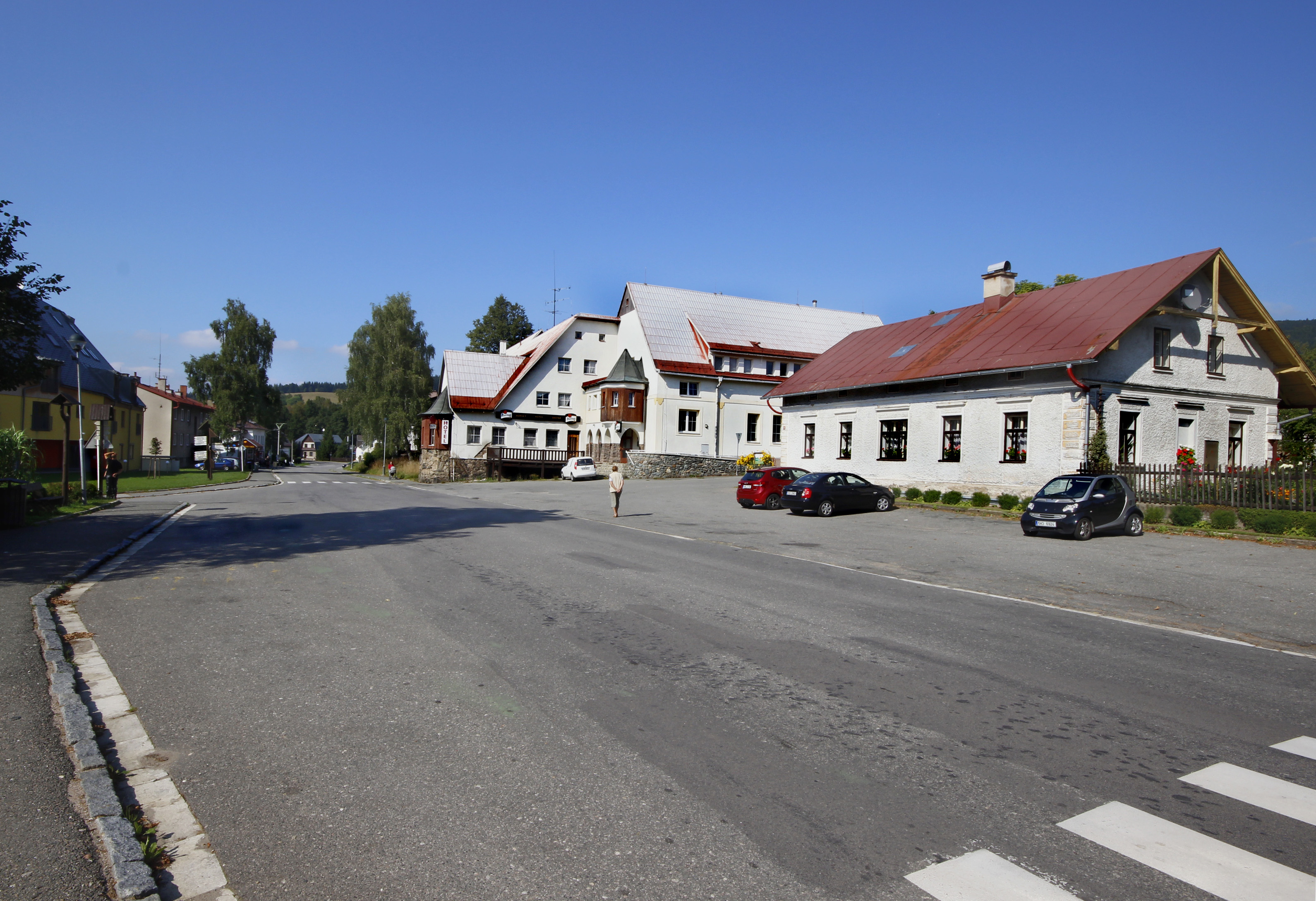
- Upper square

- Flag Coat of arms

- Location in the Czech Republic
- Coordinates: 50°18′17″N 16°21′3″E
- Country: Czech Republic
- Region: Hradec Králové
- District: Rychnov nad Kněžnou
- First mentioned: 1362

Area
  - Total: 32.12 km^{2} (12.40 sq mi)
- Elevation: 649 m (2,129 ft)

Population (2026-01-01)
  - Total: 529
  - Density: 16.5/km^{2} (42.7/sq mi)
- Time zone: UTC+1 (CET)
  - Summer (DST): UTC+2 (CEST)
- Postal code: 517 91
- Website: www.obec-destne.cz

Deštné v Orlických horách (German: Deschnei im Adlergebirge) is a municipality and village in Rychnov nad Kněžnou District in the Hradec Králové Region of the Czech Republic. It has about 500 inhabitants.

== Etymology ==
The name Deštné has its origin in the Czech adjective deštný, which was derived either from the word deska ('table', but the adjective was also used for a forested hill) or from déšť ('rain'), referring to a stream that only had water during the rainy season.

== Geography ==
Deštné v Orlických horách is located about 45 kilometres (28 mi) east of Hradec Králové. It lies in the Orlické Mountains. The highest point of Deštné v Orlických horách and of the entire mountain range is the mountain Velká Deštná at 1,116 m (3,661 ft) above sea level. The municipality briefly borders Poland in the east. The upper course of the Bělá River flows through the municipality.

== History ==
The first written mention of Deštné v Orlických horách is from 1362. It was founded before 1350. it belonged to the now non-existent Cistercian Svaté Pole Monastery in Klášter nad Dědinou.

== Demographics ==
Historical population

Year	Pop.	±%
1869	2,571	—
1880	2,496	−2.9%
1890	2,597	+4.0%
1900	2,421	−6.8%
1910	2,132	−11.9%

Year	Pop.	±%
1921	1,900	−10.9%
1930	1,766	−7.1%
1950	922	−47.8%
1961	632	−31.5%
1970	638	+0.9%

Year	Pop.	±%
1980	647	+1.4%
1991	587	−9.3%
2001	611	+4.1%
2011	621	+1.6%
2021	564	−9.2%

Source: Censuses

== Transport ==
There are no railways or major roads passing through the municipality.

== Sport ==
Deštné v Orlických horách is known for its ski resort.

== Sights ==
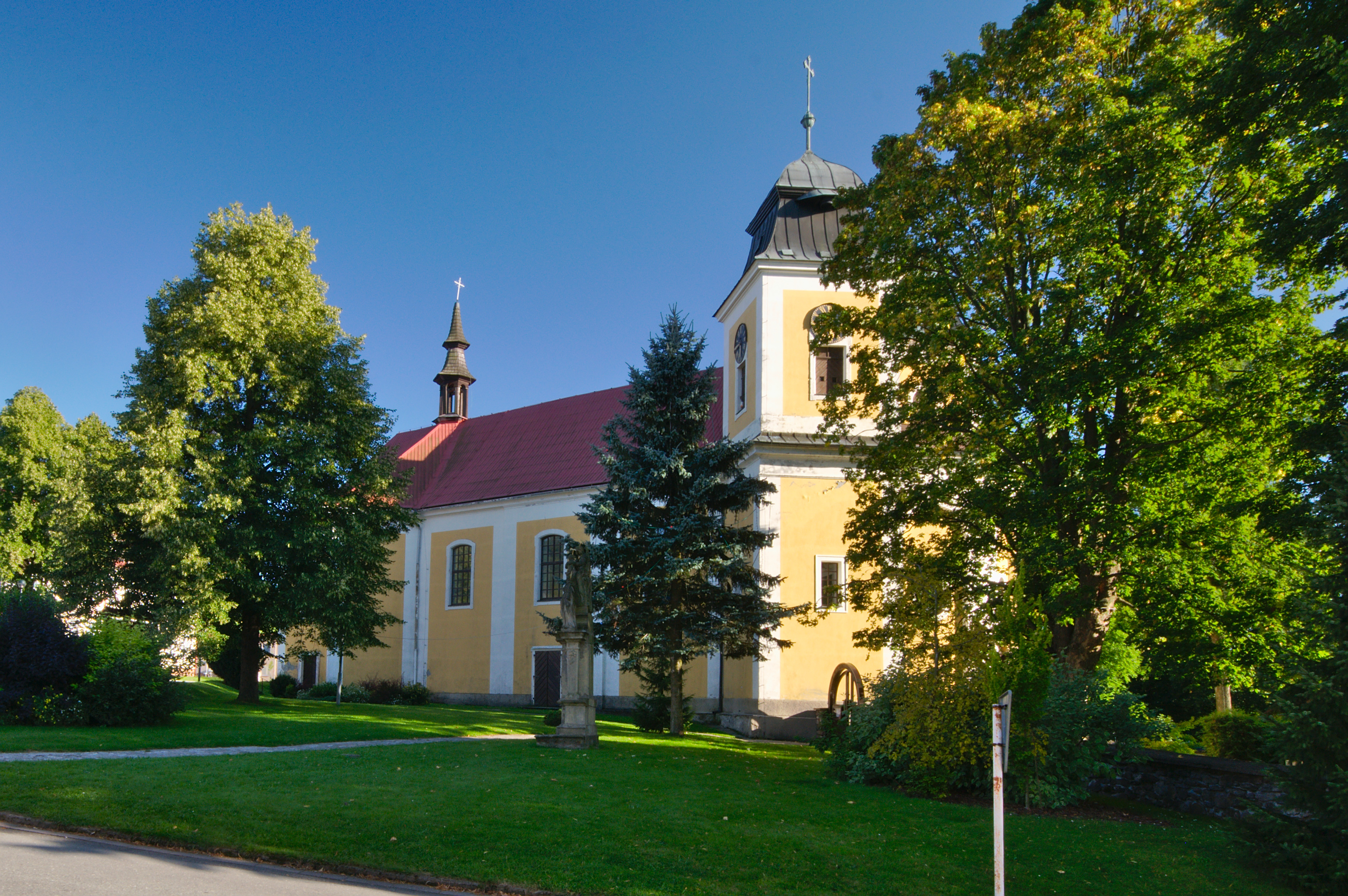
Church of Saint Mary Magdalene

The main landmark of Deštné v Orlických horách is the Church of Saint Mary Magdalene. It was built in the Baroque style in 1723–1726. The church was built according to the design by Jan Santini Aichel and was probably one of his last works.

The Velká Deštná observation tower was opened in 2019. It replaced an old wooden tower, demolished in 2010. The new observation tower has a steel structure covered with wood and is 19 m (62 ft) high. The observation tower is among the four most visited observation towers in the country with about 100,000 visitors per year.
