= Rokytnice v Orlických horách =

- Town
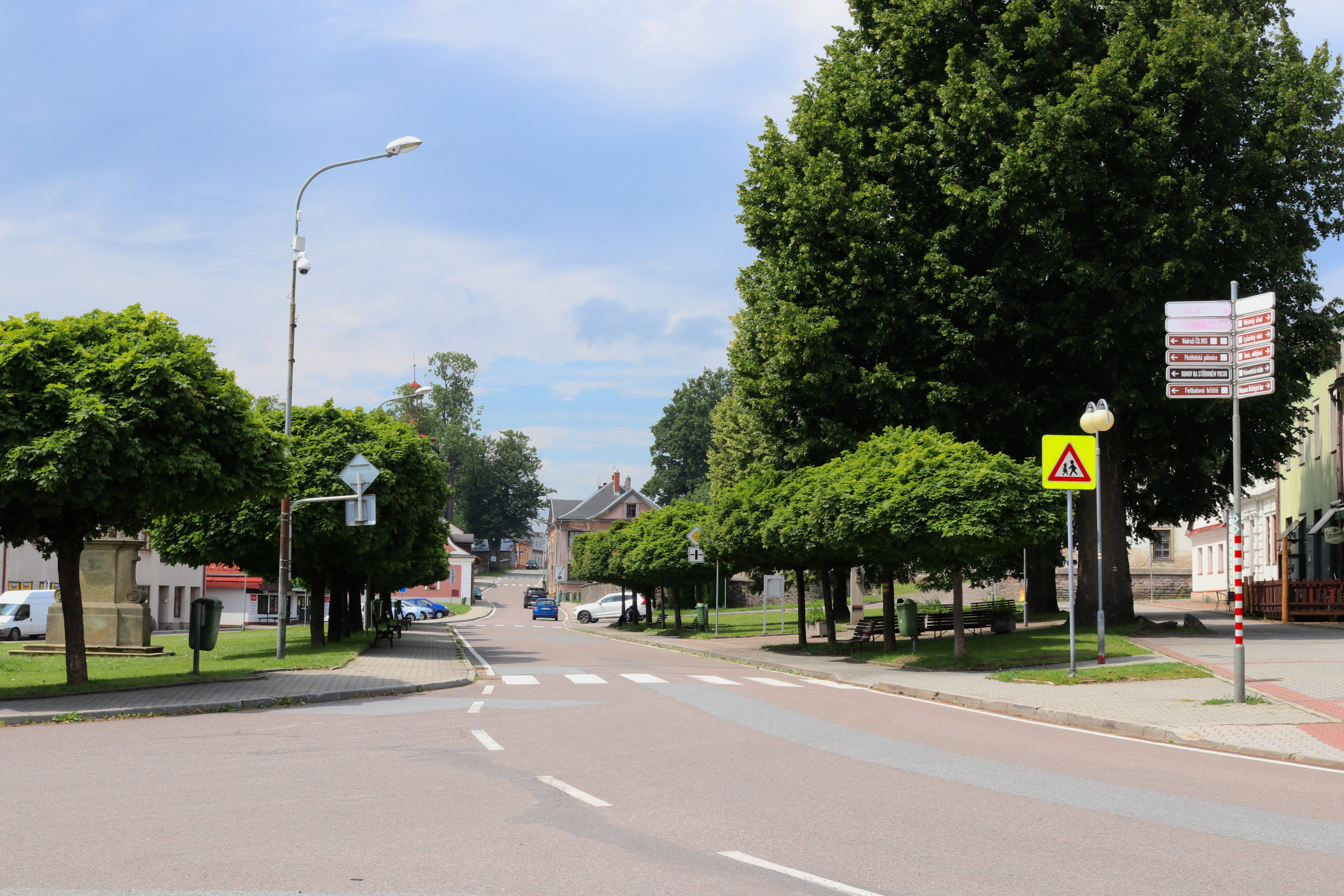
- Town square

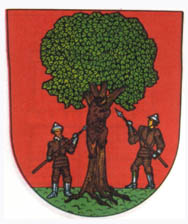
- Flag Coat of arms

- Location in the Czech Republic
- Coordinates: 50°10′11″N 16°28′23″E
- Country: Czech Republic
- Region: Hradec Králové
- District: Rychnov nad Kněžnou
- First mentioned: 1318

Government
  - Mayor: Jiří Štěpán (MY)

Area
  - Total: 40.20 km^{2} (15.52 sq mi)
- Elevation: 580 m (1,900 ft)

Population (2026-01-01)
  - Total: 2,113
  - Density: 52.56/km^{2} (136.1/sq mi)
- Time zone: UTC+1 (CET)
  - Summer (DST): UTC+2 (CEST)
- Postal code: 517 61
- Website: www.rokytnicevoh.cz

Rokytnice v Orlických horách (Czech pronunciation: [ˈrokɪtɲɪtsɛ ˈv orlɪtskiːx ˈɦoraːx]; German: Rokitnitz in Adlergebirge) is a town in Rychnov nad Kněžnou District in the Hradec Králové Region of the Czech Republic. It has about 2,100 inhabitants. The town is located on the Rokytenka Stream in the Orlické Mountains.

Rokytnice v Orlických horách became a town in 1852. The historic town centre is well preserved and is protected as an urban monument zone. The main landmark is the Rokytnice v Orlických horách Castle.

== Administrative division ==
Rokytnice v Orlických horách consists of two municipal parts (in brackets population according to the 2021 census):

- Rokytnice v Orlických horách (1,853)
- Nebeská Rybná (73)

== Etymology ==
The original name of the local stream was Rokytnice and the name was transferred to the town. The name of the stream was derived from the Old Czech word rokyta (i.e. 'willow') and from the adjective rokytná, meaning "flowing between willows". Between 1910 and 1920, Rokytnice was renamed Rokytnice v Orlických horách ('Rokytnice in Orlické Mountains').

== Geography ==
Rokytnice v Orlických horách is located about 13 kilometres (8 mi) east of Rychnov nad Kněžnou and 44 km (27 mi) east of Hradec Králové. It lies in the Orlické Mountains. The highest point is a mountain at 951 m (3,120 ft) above sea level. The Rokytenka Stream flows through the town. The Zdobnice River flows along the western municipal border.

=== Climate ===
Rokytnice v Orlických horách has a humid continental climate (Köppen Dfb; Trewartha: Dclo). The annual average temperature is 7.6 °C (45.7 °F), the hottest month in July is 17.5 °C (63.5 °F), and the coldest month is −2.4 °C (27.7 °F) in January. The annual precipitation is 906.5 millimetres (35.69 in), of which July is the wettest with 106.7 millimetres (4.20 in), while April is the driest with only 45.8 millimetres (1.80 in). The extreme temperature throughout the year ranged from −29.5 °C (−21.1 °F) on 9 February 1956 to 35.2 °C (95.4 °F) on 27 July 1983.

Climate data for Rokytnice v Orlických horách, 1991–2020 normals, extremes 1961–present
Month	Jan	Feb	Mar	Apr	May	Jun	Jul	Aug	Sep	Oct	Nov	Dec	Year
Record high °C (°F)	11.5 (52.7)	15.6 (60.1)	20.7 (69.3)	26.7 (80.1)	29.3 (84.7)	32.5 (90.5)	35.2 (95.4)	33.6 (92.5)	30.4 (86.7)	23.6 (74.5)	18.0 (64.4)	13.6 (56.5)	35.2 (95.4)
Mean daily maximum °C (°F)	0.1 (32.2)	1.8 (35.2)	6.2 (43.2)	12.9 (55.2)	17.6 (63.7)	20.9 (69.6)	22.9 (73.2)	23.0 (73.4)	17.4 (63.3)	11.4 (52.5)	5.5 (41.9)	0.9 (33.6)	11.7 (53.1)
Daily mean °C (°F)	−2.4 (27.7)	−1.3 (29.7)	2.1 (35.8)	7.9 (46.2)	12.4 (54.3)	15.7 (60.3)	17.5 (63.5)	17.3 (63.1)	12.5 (54.5)	7.6 (45.7)	2.9 (37.2)	−1.5 (29.3)	7.6 (45.7)
Mean daily minimum °C (°F)	−4.9 (23.2)	−4.2 (24.4)	−1.3 (29.7)	3.3 (37.9)	7.6 (45.7)	10.8 (51.4)	12.5 (54.5)	12.5 (54.5)	8.7 (47.7)	4.6 (40.3)	0.6 (33.1)	−3.7 (25.3)	3.9 (39.0)
Record low °C (°F)	−25.4 (−13.7)	−29.5 (−21.1)	−22.5 (−8.5)	−11.0 (12.2)	−4.8 (23.4)	0.4 (32.7)	3.0 (37.4)	0.1 (32.2)	−2.0 (28.4)	−8.2 (17.2)	−15.8 (3.6)	−21.2 (−6.2)	−29.5 (−21.1)
Average precipitation mm (inches)	78.7 (3.10)	60.8 (2.39)	68.7 (2.70)	45.8 (1.80)	77.5 (3.05)	93.8 (3.69)	106.7 (4.20)	86.0 (3.39)	76.5 (3.01)	65.2 (2.57)	69.4 (2.73)	77.4 (3.05)	906.5 (35.69)
Average snowfall cm (inches)	42.4 (16.7)	36.7 (14.4)	21.4 (8.4)	5.1 (2.0)	0.0 (0.0)	0.0 (0.0)	0.0 (0.0)	0.0 (0.0)	0.0 (0.0)	2.5 (1.0)	14.7 (5.8)	33.6 (13.2)	156.5 (61.6)
Average relative humidity (%)	87.5	82.8	76.9	66.9	68.5	69.7	70.0	69.8	76.8	82.4	87.4	89.1	77.3
Mean monthly sunshine hours	42.5	63.4	119.9	188.1	193.3	204.8	222.1	202.5	155.3	97.6	44.6	28.2	1,560.2
Source: Czech Hydrometeorological Institute

== History ==
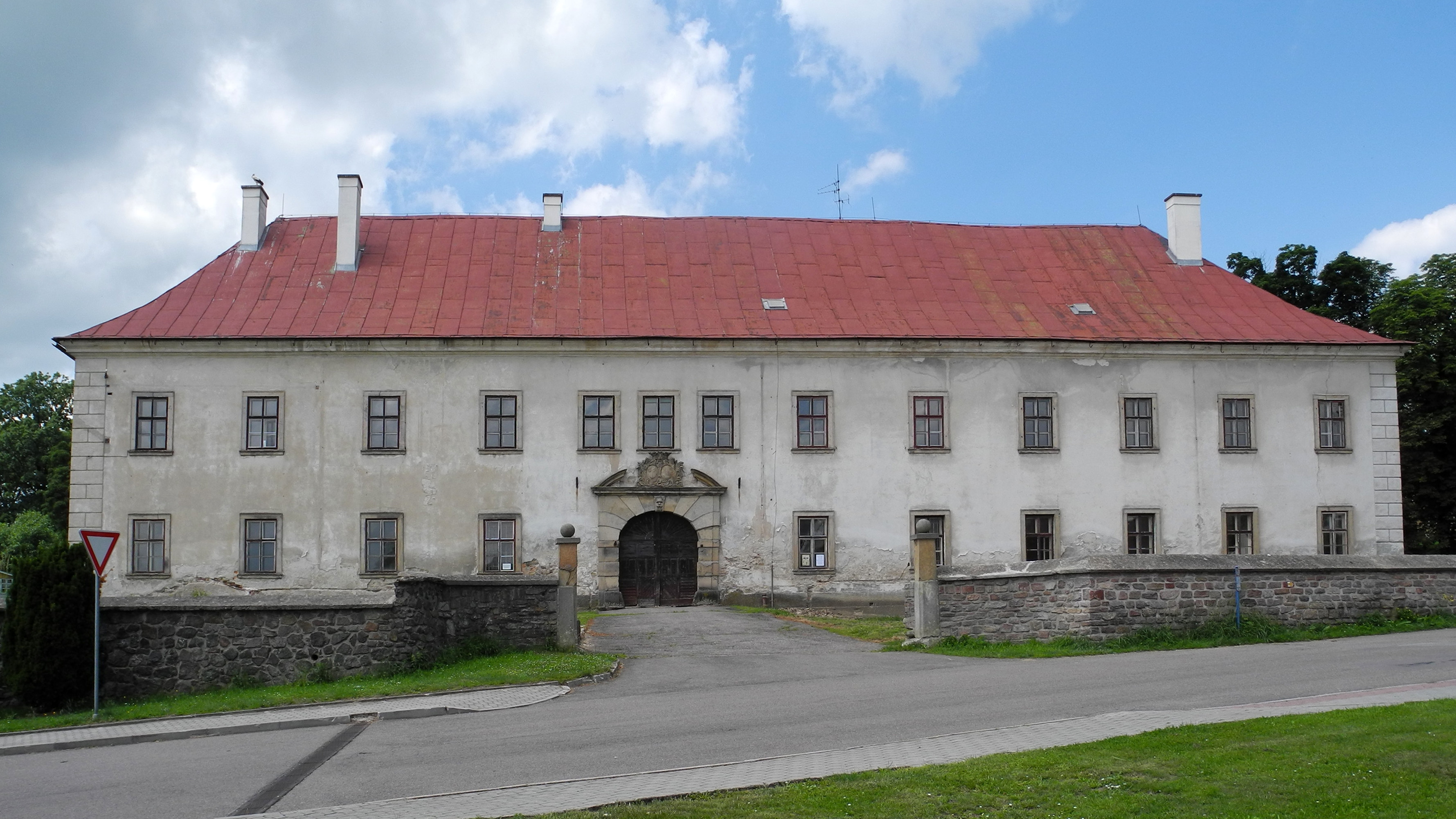
Rokytnice v Orlických horách Castle

The first written mention of Rokytnice v Orlických horách is from 1318. In 1487, Rokytnice divided from the Rychnov estate and became the centre of a separate estate. In 1548, when the estate and the market town of Rokytnice were acquired by the Licek of Rýzmburk family, a water fortress was built here. From 1567, Rokytnice was owned by various German noble families and colonised by German people, especially craftsmen.

From 1712 to 1938, the Jewish community was present. Rokytnice was promoted to a town in 1852. The railway was opened in 1906. The Germans made up the majority of population until World War II, but in 1945, the German-speaking population was expelled.

== Demographics ==
Historical population

Year	Pop.	±%
1869	4,089	—
1880	4,395	+7.5%
1890	4,161	−5.3%
1900	3,801	−8.7%
1910	3,416	−10.1%

Year	Pop.	±%
1921	3,125	−8.5%
1930	3,028	−3.1%
1950	2,175	−28.2%
1961	1,954	−10.2%
1970	1,825	−6.6%

Year	Pop.	±%
1980	1,896	+3.9%
1991	1,964	+3.6%
2001	2,513	+28.0%
2011	2,114	−15.9%
2021	1,926	−8.9%

Source: Censuses

== Transport ==
The railway line of local importance to Doudleby nad Orlicí starts here.

== Sights ==
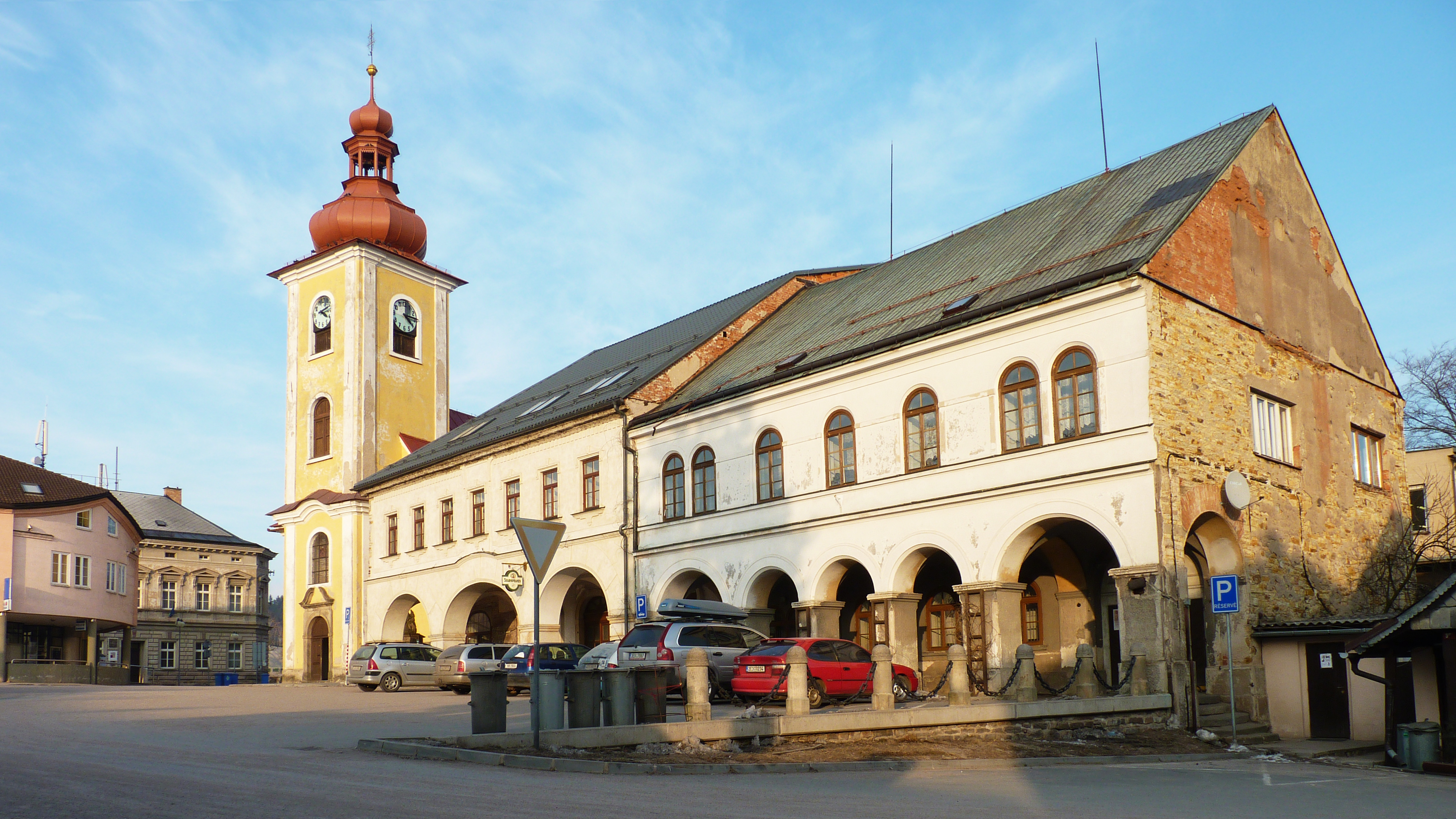
Church of All Saints on the town square

The most valuable building is the Rokytnice v Orlických horách Castle. It was built in 1600 during the rule of Kryštof Mauschwitz of Armenruh, who had demolished the old fortress and had built the late Renaissance castle.

The Church of All Saints was built in 1679–1684 on the site of a wooden church from the 14th century, which was destroyed by a fire in 1661.

== Notable people ==
- Else Kastner-Michalitschke (1868–1939), Austrian writer
- Elfriede Kuzmany (1915–2006), Austrian actress
