= Čenkovice =

- Municipality
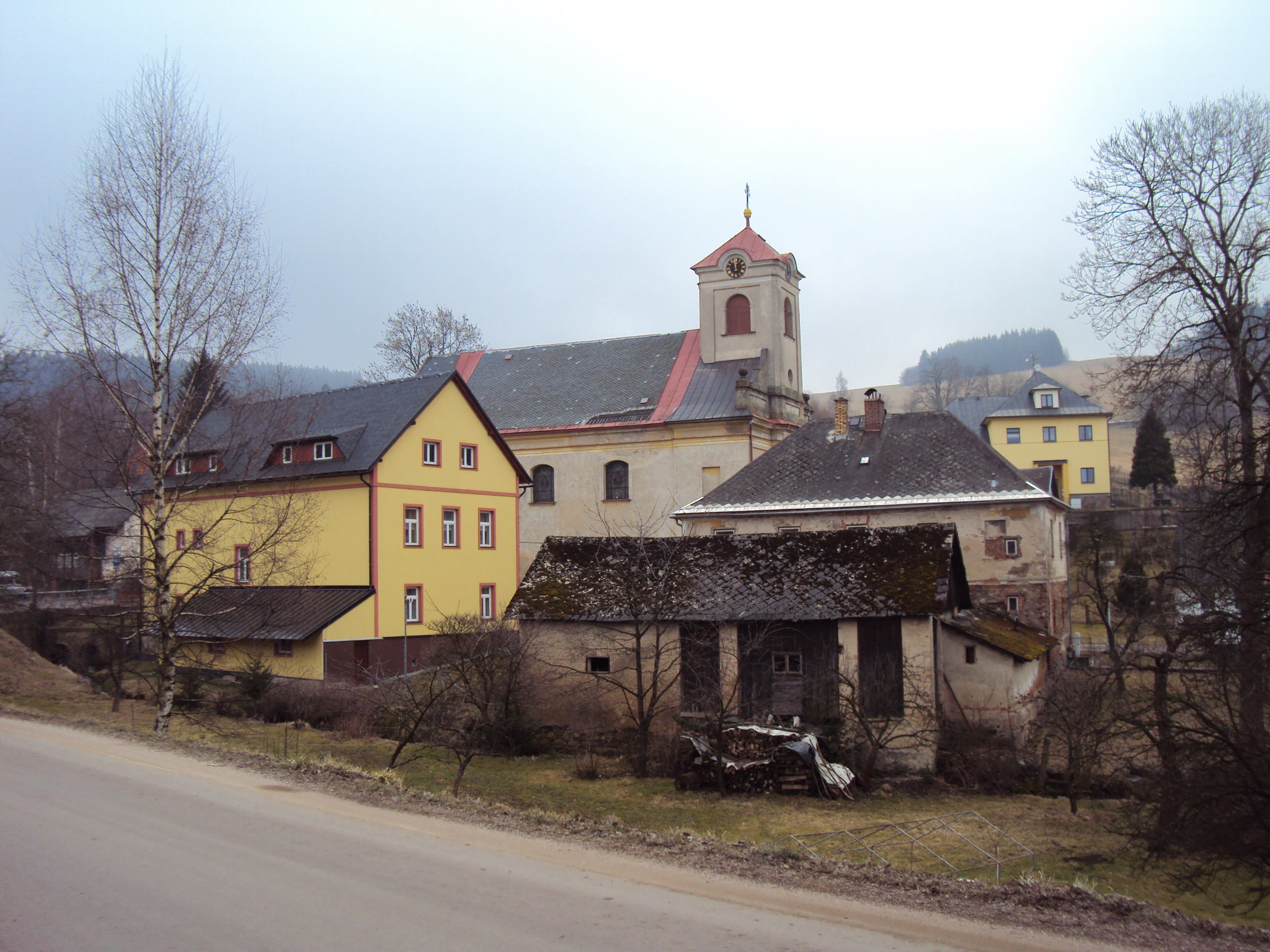
- Church of Saint Lawrence

- Flag Coat of arms

- Location in the Czech Republic
- Coordinates: 50°0′41″N 16°40′57″E
- Country: Czech Republic
- Region: Pardubice
- District: Ústí nad Orlicí
- First mentioned: 1304

Area
  - Total: 5.98 km^{2} (2.31 sq mi)
- Elevation: 665 m (2,182 ft)

Population (2026-01-01)
  - Total: 182
  - Density: 30.4/km^{2} (78.8/sq mi)
- Time zone: UTC+1 (CET)
  - Summer (DST): UTC+2 (CEST)
- Postal code: 561 64
- Website: www.obeccenkovice.cz

Čenkovice is a municipality and village in Ústí nad Orlicí District in the Pardubice Region of the Czech Republic. It has about 200 inhabitants. It is a centre of winter sports.

== Etymology ==
The initial German name of the village was Schunkendorf, meaning "Schunk(e)'s village". Already in the earliest times, the name was Czechized to Czunkendorf and then to Čenkovice.

== Geography ==
Čenkovice is located about 21 kilometres (13 mi) east of Ústí nad Orlicí and 64 km (40 mi) east of Pardubice. It lies in the Orlické Mountains. The highest point is the mountain Buková hora at 958 m (3,143 ft) above sea level. The Bystřec Stream originates in the village and flows through the municipality.

== History ==
The first written mention of Čenkovice is from 1304.

== Demographics ==
Historical population

Year	Pop.	±%
1869	1,570	—
1880	1,402	−10.7%
1890	1,233	−12.1%
1900	959	−22.2%
1910	784	−18.2%

Year	Pop.	±%
1921	727	−7.3%
1930	714	−1.8%
1950	156	−78.2%
1961	201	+28.8%
1970	212	+5.5%

Year	Pop.	±%
1980	211	−0.5%
1991	201	−4.7%
2001	188	−6.5%
2011	168	−10.6%
2021	180	+7.1%

Source: Censuses

== Transport ==
The I/11 road (the section from Hradec Králové to Šumperk) runs through the northern part of the municipality.

== Sport ==
Čenkovice is known for a ski resort located on Buková hora and its surroundings. There are 65 km (40 mi) of cross-country trails and five ski slopes.

== Sights ==
The main landmark of Čenkovice is the Church of Saint Lawrence. It was built in the Neoclassical style in 1780–1782. It is a valuable rural church.
