= Else Kastner-Michalitschke =

Austrian writer (1868–1939)

Else Kastner-Michalitschke (28 April 1868 – 2 January 1939) was an Austrian writer.

She was born in Rokytnice v Orlických horách, in what was then Austria-Hungary and today the Czech Republic. She studied to become a teacher in Prague and lived in Vienna from 1892. She was married to Eduard Fedor Kastner, and later to Carl B. Braum. She was co-founder of the literary magazine Böhmens deutsche Poesie und Kunst and contributed to the magazine Wir leben. She also published several collections of poetry. She received numerous awards in recognition of her artistic accomplishments.
