= Petr Stančík =

Czech writer

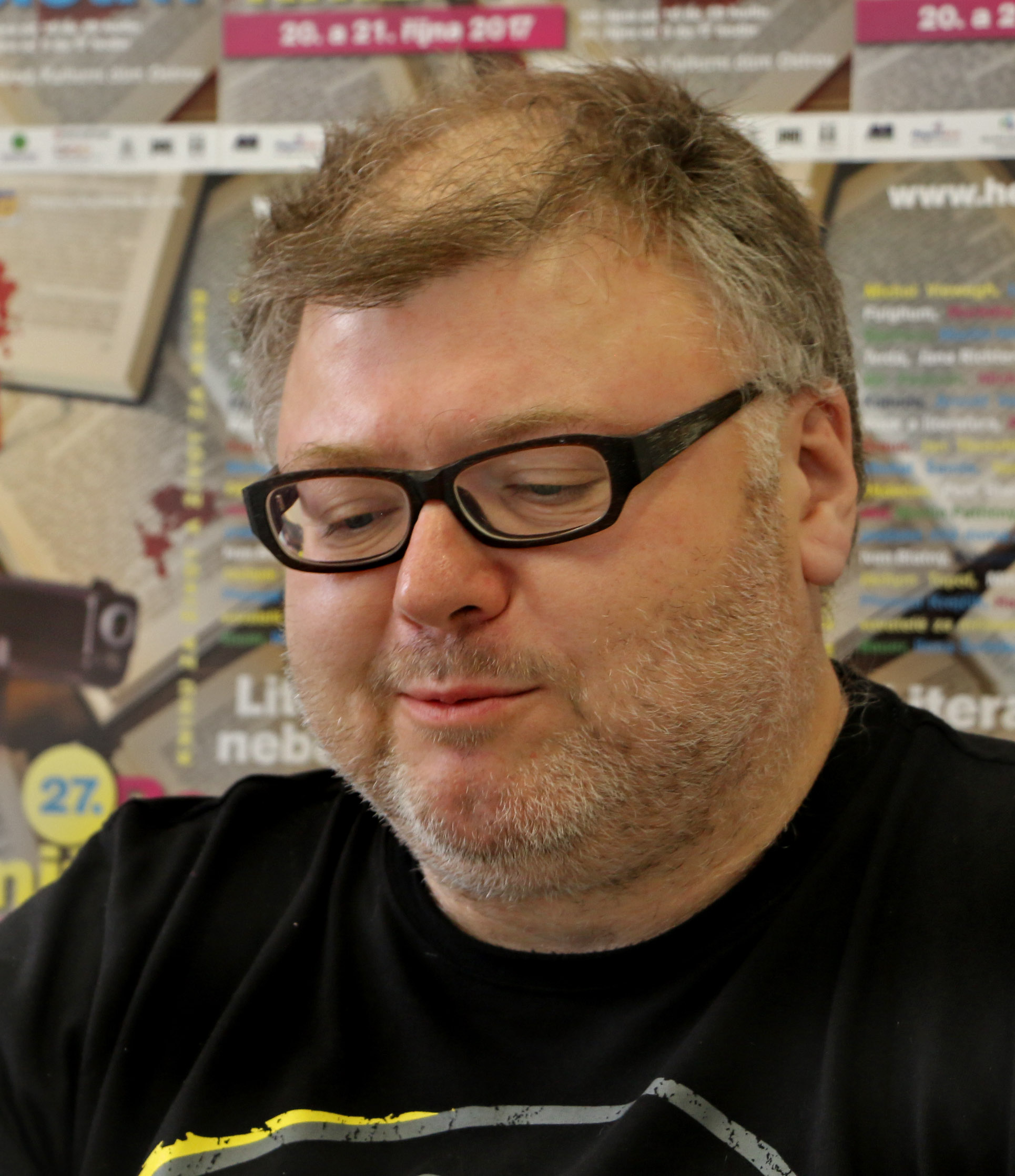
- Stančík in 2017
- Born: 9 June 1968 (age 58); Rychnov nad Kněžnou, Czech Republic
- Writing career
- Pen name: Odillo Stradický ze Strdic

Petr Stančík (Czech pronunciation: [ˈpɛtr̩ ˈstantʃiːk]; born 9 June 1968 in Rychnov nad Kněžnou) is a Czech author, poet, novelist, essayist, dramatist and copywriter.

== Life ==
Stančík’s parents are teachers. Petr Stančík graduated from secondary school in Hradec Králové in 1985. Until 1989 he performed many manual jobs. From 1989 to 1991 he studied directing at the Academy of Performing Arts (DAMU) in Prague, but left the school. From 1992 to 1995 he worked as a TV director, and since 1995 he has been earning his living as an advertising copywriter and consultant. He is the chairman of the professional organization Czech Writers Syndicate (Český spolek textařů).

== Work ==
The first publicly published text of Stančík was the essay Smrt živá, which appeared in 1990 in the magazine Iniciály. Up until the end of 2006 he usually published under the pseudonym Odillo Stradický ze Strdic. His texts have been translated into Polish, Lithuanian and Albanian.

== Bibliography ==
=== Novels ===
- Obojí pramen (NPDN 1993)
- Admirál čaje (Český spisovatel 1996)
- Zlomená nadkova (Petrov 1997)
- Fosfen (Petrov 2001)
- Pérák (Druhé město 2008) ISBN 978-80-7227-267-9
- Mlýn na mumie (Druhé město 2014) ISBN 978-80-7227-344-7
- Andělí vejce (Druhé město 2016) ISBN 978-80-7227-385-0.

=== Poetry ===
- První kost božího těla (Petrov 1997)
- Zpěv motýlů (Petrov 1999)
- Černý revolver týdne (Petrov 2004)
- Virgonaut (Druhé město 2010) ISBN 978-80-7227-293-8

=== Children's literature ===
- Mrkev ho vcucla pod zem (Meander 2013) ISBN 978-80-87596-23-4
- Jezevec Chrujda točí film (Meander 2014) ISBN 978-80-87596-40-1

=== Drama ===
- Svatá... svatá? svatá! Ludmila (Větrné mlýny 2002)

=== Literary science ===
- Ryby katedrál. Anthology of 20th-century Czech Poetry in Bohemia, Moravia and Silesia (Petrov 2002)
- Orgie obraznosti. Sborník ke třetímu výročí smrti Odilla Stradického ze Strdic (Krasoumná jednota 2009) ISBN 978-80-904510-0-1

=== Represented in almanacs ===
- Lepě svihlí tlové (Petrov 2002)
- 7edm (Theo 2006)
- Co to je toto? (Druhé město 2012) ISBN 978-80-7227-321-8
- Miliónový časy. Povídky pro Adru (Argo 2014) ISBN 978-80-257-1029-6

=== Literature ===
- Lubomír Machala - Průvodce po nových jménech české poezie a prózy 1990-1995 (Rubico 1996)
- Antologie české poezie II. díl 1986–2006 (Dybbuk 2007)
