= Jan Antonín Vocásek =

Czech painter (1706–1757)

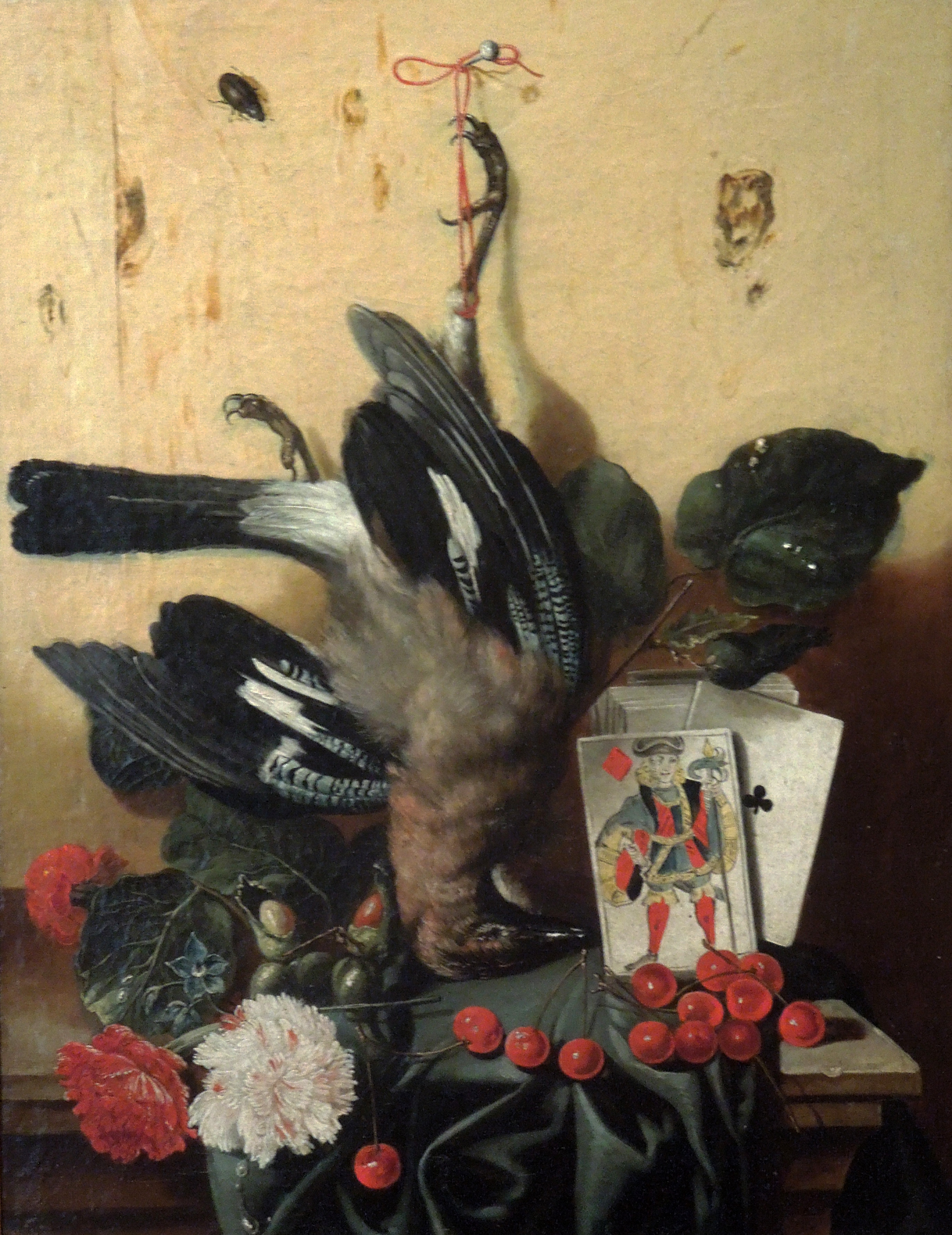
Still Life with Jaybird, Cards, Carnations and Cherries

Jan Antonín Vocásek (also Vocásek-Hrošecký; 26 February 1706 – 26 June 1757) was a Czech Baroque painter. He specialised in creating still lifes. He lived his entire life in Rychnov nad Kněžnou.

== Life and career ==
Vocásek was born on 26 February 1706 in Rychnov nad Kněžnou in Bohemia. He was probably a pupil of painter Jeroným Kapoun and married his sister, Veronika Kapounová. He worked in Rychnov nad Kněžnou as a court painter for the Kolowrat family. He studied their collection of paintings and was inspired by Izaak Godijn and other Flemish and Italian painters. He died in Rychnov nad Kněžnou on 26 June 1757, at the age of 51.

== Work ==
Vocásek's work is a representative of the Rococo trompe-l'œil style. He focused on painting of still lifes with fish, birds, insect, cards, flowers and fruit with realistically detailed precision. He liked to combine still and living nature and presented hunting catches. He also painted altarpieces and portraits of horses. He signed some of his paintings as Hroschetzky, referring to the village of Hroška, where his mother came from.

Vocásek's paintings are exhibited in the Rychnov nad Kněžnou Castle (as part of the Kolowrat family collection) and in the National Gallery Prague.
