= Alena Hromádková =

Czech economist, politician and academic (1943–2024)

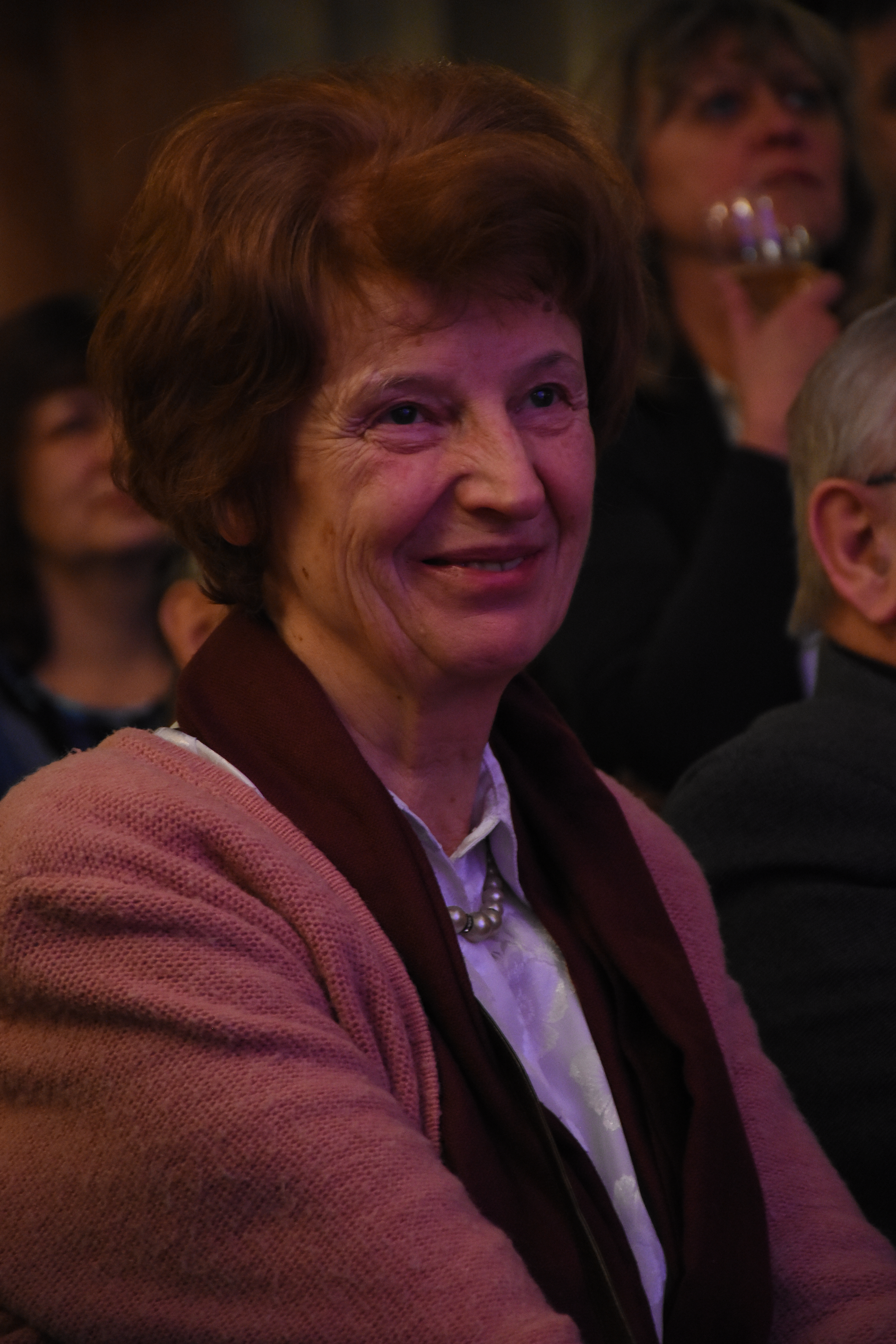
- Hromádková in 2017
- Born: 29 April 1943; Rychnov nad Kněžnou, Protectorate of Bohemia and Moravia
- Died: 2 April 2024 (aged 80)

Alena Hromádková (29 April 1943 – 2 April 2024) was a Czech economist, politician and academic, specializing in issues of modernization and expansion of higher education systems. In 1994, she co-founded the Democratic Union, in whom she was their first president from 1994 to 1996.

== Life and career ==
Hromádková studied at the Prague University of Economics and Business, then she studied sociology of education. During the period of normalization, she was active in dissent, and in 1977 she signed Charter 77. In the 1980s she organized samizdat activities and seminars in the field of political philosophy. In 1991, two years after the Velvet Revolution, she was one of the three penultimate speakers of Charter 77.

From 1992, Hromádková taught at Charles University. In 1994, she was one of the founders of the Democratic Union (DEU), subsequently appearing frequently in the Czech media on the subject of the Czech transformation process. In June 1996, she resigned from the position of chairperson of the DEU and since 1999, she had been without political affiliation. In 2004, she ran for the European Parliament as a candidate for the Conservative Party.

Hromadkova died on 2 April 2024, at the age of 80.
