= Velká Deštná =

- View from southeast

Highest point
- Elevation: 1,116 m (3,661 ft)
- Prominence: 587 m (1,926 ft)
- Parent peak: Králický Sněžník
- Isolation: 29 km (18 mi)
- Listing: Mountains of the Czech Republic
- Coordinates: 50°18′18″N 16°23′56.7″E

Geography
- Location within Czech Republic
- Location: Deštné v Orlických horách
- Country: Czech Republic
- Parent range: Orlické Mountains

Velká Deštná (German: Deschneyer Großkoppe) is a mountain in the Hradec Králové Region of the Czech Republic. With an elevation of 1,116 m (3,661 ft), it is the highest mountain of the Orlické Mountains and of the whole Central Sudetes range. There is an observation tower on top of the mountain, which is one of the most visited observation towers in the country.

== Geography ==
Velká Deštná observation tower

Velká Deštná is located in the municipal territory of Deštné v Orlických horách, about 40 kilometres (25 mi) east of the city of Hradec Králové. It is situated in the Orlické Mountains of the Central Sudetes and is the highest mountain of the Central Sudetes. According to the latest measurement, its altitude is 1,116 m (3,661 ft). North of the summit is the side peak Malá Deštná at 1,090 m (3,580 ft) and south of the summit is the side peak Maruša (also called Marušin kámen) at 1,043 m (3,422 ft).

The entire Orlické Mountains area, including Velká Deštná, belongs to the Orlické hory Protected Landscape Area. Between the peaks of Velká Deštná and Malá Deštná is the Jelení lázeň Nature Reserve. The 8.2 ha (20 acres) area is protected for its ridge bog with characteristic endangered flora, fauna and typical bog phenomena.

== Observation tower ==
The Velká Deštná observation tower was opened in 2019. It replaced an old wooden observation tower that was demolished in 2010. The new observation tower has a steel structure covered with wood and is 19 m (62 ft) high.

In 2021 and 2022, Velká Deštná was among the three most visited observation towers in the country with about 100,000 visitors per year and the most visited outside Prague.
