= Jahodov =

- Municipality
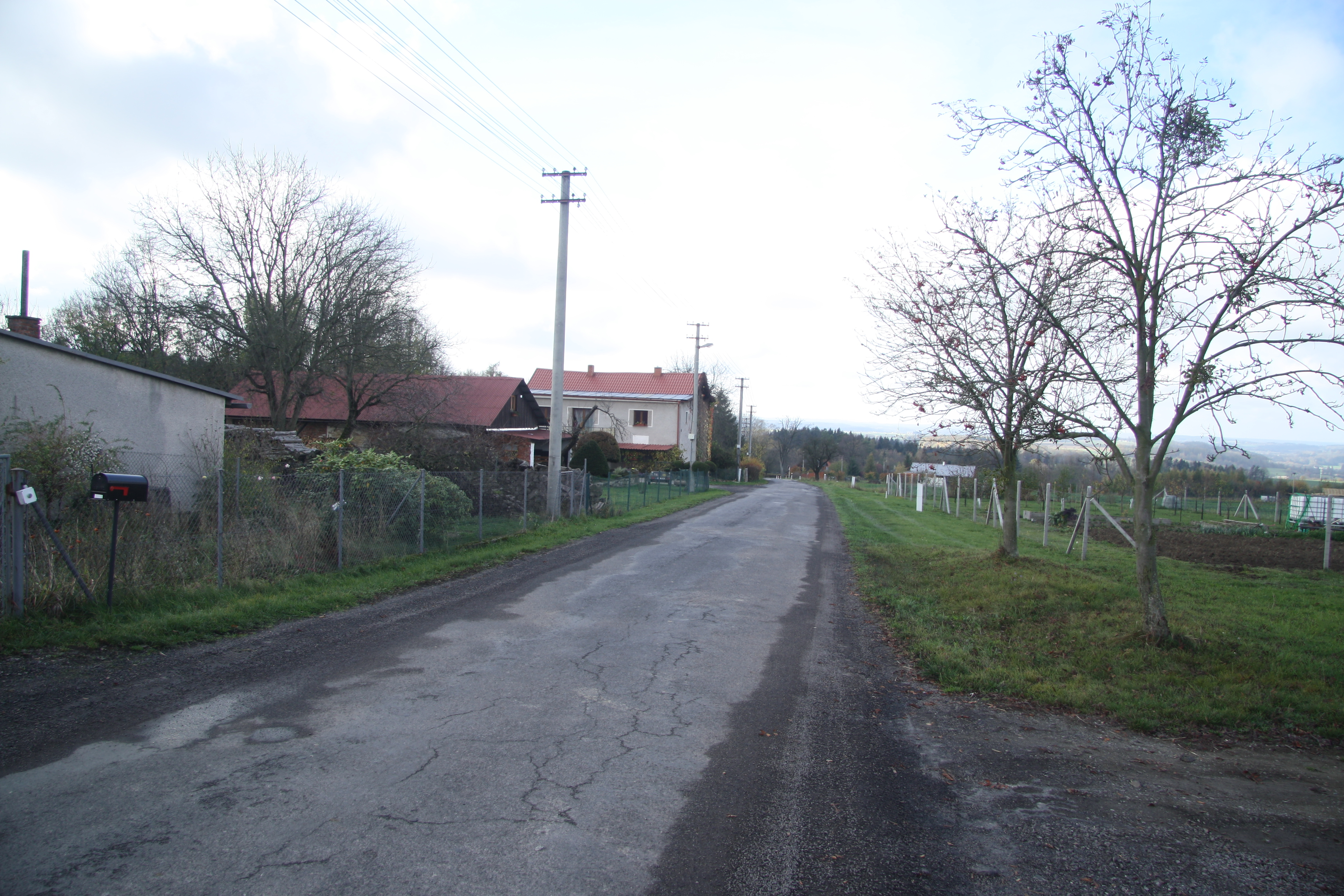
- Road in Jahodov

- Location in the Czech Republic
- Coordinates: 50°9′1″N 16°20′0″E
- Country: Czech Republic
- Region: Hradec Králové
- District: Rychnov nad Kněžnou
- First mentioned: 1707

Area
  - Total: 4.25 km^{2} (1.64 sq mi)
- Elevation: 410 m (1,350 ft)

Population (2026-01-01)
  - Total: 98
  - Density: 23/km^{2} (60/sq mi)
- Time zone: UTC+1 (CET)
  - Summer (DST): UTC+2 (CEST)
- Postal code: 516 01
- Website: www.inu.cz/jahodov/

Jahodov is a municipality and village in Rychnov nad Kněžnou District in the Hradec Králové Region of the Czech Republic. It has about 100 inhabitants.

== Demographics ==
Historical population
| Year | Pop. | ±% |
|---|---|---|
| 1869 | 166 | — |
| 1880 | 139 | −16.3% |
| 1890 | 167 | +20.1% |
| 1900 | 157 | −6.0% |
| 1910 | 123 | −21.7% |
| 1921 | 131 | +6.5% |
| 1930 | 127 | −3.1% |
| 1950 | 109 | −14.2% |
| 1961 | 109 | +0.0% |
| 1970 | 92 | −15.6% |
| 1980 | 77 | −16.3% |
| 1991 | 68 | −11.7% |
| 2001 | 80 | +17.6% |
| 2011 | 92 | +15.0% |
| 2021 | 110 | +19.6% |
Source: Censuses
