= Rychnov nad Kněžnou =

- Town
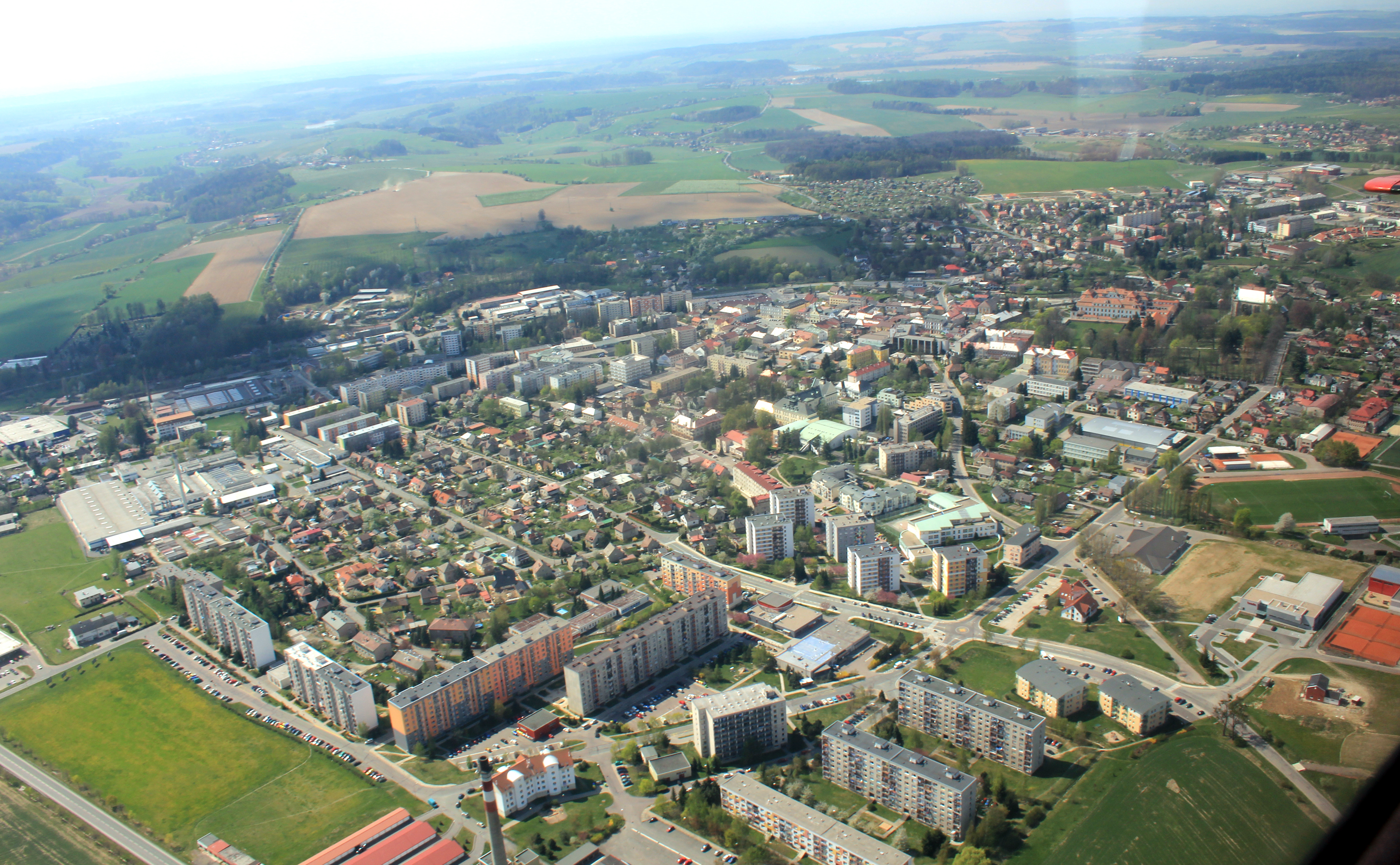
- Aerial view

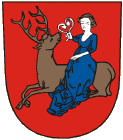
- Flag Coat of arms

- Location in the Czech Republic
- Coordinates: 50°9′47″N 16°16′28″E
- Country: Czech Republic
- Region: Hradec Králové
- District: Rychnov nad Kněžnou
- First mentioned: 1258

Government
  - Mayor: Jan Skořepa (ODS)

Area
  - Total: 34.99 km^{2} (13.51 sq mi)
- Elevation: 320 m (1,050 ft)

Population (2026-01-01)
  - Total: 11,693
  - Density: 334.2/km^{2} (865.5/sq mi)
- Time zone: UTC+1 (CET)
  - Summer (DST): UTC+2 (CEST)
- Postal code: 516 01
- Website: www.rychnov-city.cz

Rychnov nad Kněžnou (Czech pronunciation: [ˈrɪxnof ˈnat kɲɛʒnou]; German: Reichenau an der Knieschna) is a town in the Hradec Králové Region of the Czech Republic. It has about 12,000 inhabitants. The town is located on the Kněžna River.

The history of Rychnov nad Kněžnou is primarily connected with the noble Kolowrat family, who owned the town since 1640 and had a castle built here. The historic town centre is well preserved and is protected as an urban monument zone.

== Administrative division ==
Rychnov nad Kněžnou consists of eight municipal parts (in brackets population according to the 2021 census):

- Rychnov nad Kněžnou (9,040)
- Dlouhá Ves (548)
- Jámy (8)
- Lipovka (357)
- Litohrady (89)
- Lokot (110)
- Panská Habrová (126)
- Roveň (310)

== Etymology ==
The name Rychnov is derived from the old German phrase zu der richen ouwe, meaning 'at the rich floodplain', 'at the rich meadow'. The word 'rich' denotes here fertile, productive land.

== Geography ==
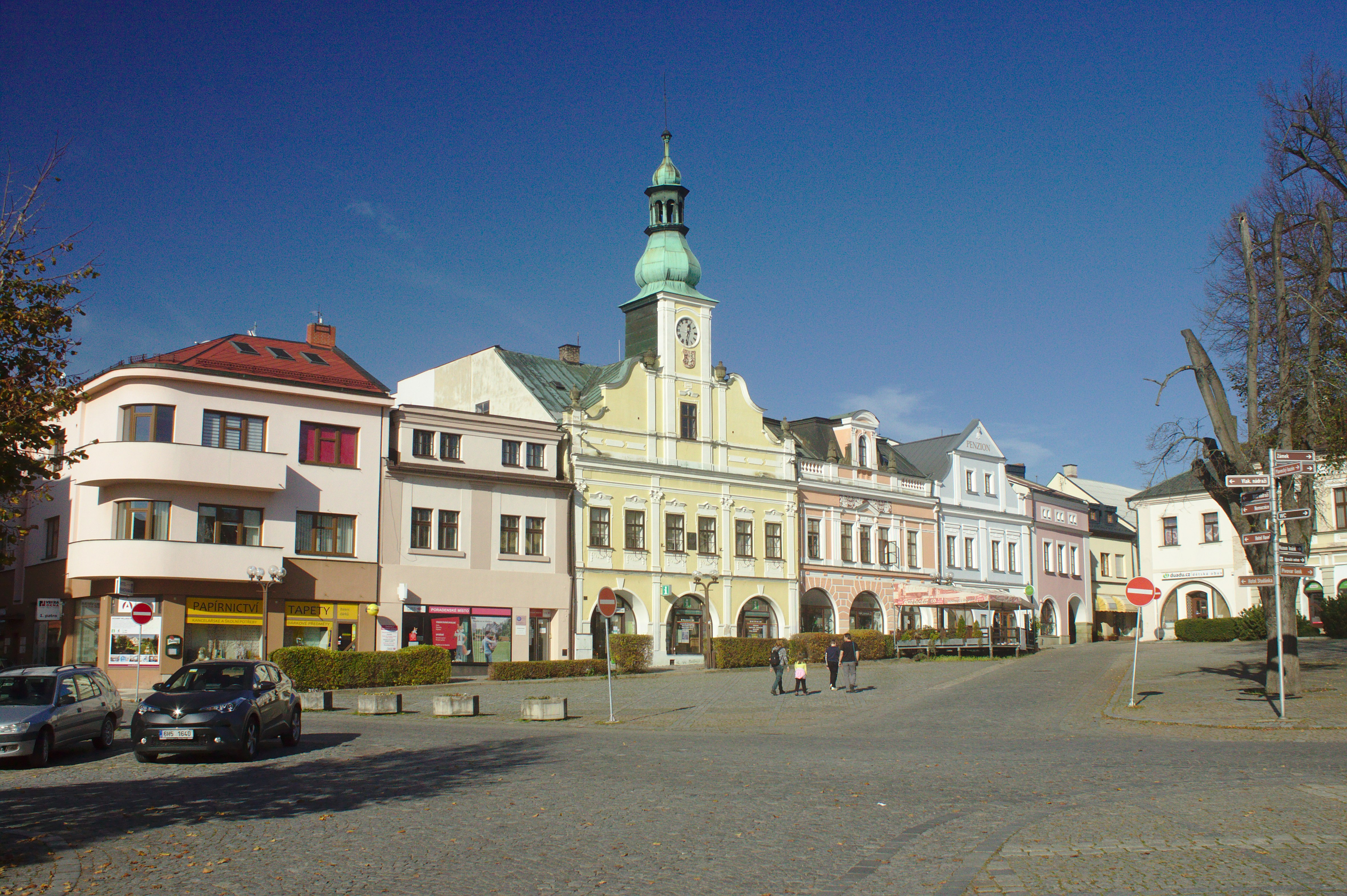
Staré náměstí with the former town hall

Rychnov nad Kněžnou is located about 31 kilometres (19 mi) east of Hradec Králové. The western part of the municipal territory lies in the Orlice Table and includes most of the built-up area. The eastern part lies in the Orlické Foothills and includes the highest point of Rychnov nad Kněžnou at 458 m (1,503 ft) above sea level.

The town is situated on the Kněžna River. The streams Liberský potok and Javornický potok joins the Kněžna in the municipal territory. Near the town is the Les Včelný Nature Park.

== History ==
The first written mention of Rychnov nad Kněžnou is in a deed of Ottokar II of Bohemia from 1 February 1258, where Heřman of Rychnov was mentioned. In 1561, Rychnov was promoted to a royal town by Ferdinand I. The town hall in Rychnov was first documented in 1596.

In 1640, the Rychnov estate was bought by the Kolowrat family. During the Thirty Years' War, the town was badly damaged. In 1676, František Karel I Kolowrat had a new castle built here. The castle was gradually expanded by other family members. The Kolowrats owend the Rychnov estate until World War II.

Until 1918, the town was part of Austria-Hungary and head of the Reichenau District, one of the 94 Bezirkshauptmannschaften in Bohemia.

In 1950, several municipalities were joined to Rychnov nad Kněžnou. On 1 January 1990, four parts of Rychnov nad Kněžnou became three separate municipalities (Jahodov, Lukavice and Synkov-Slemeno).

== Demographics ==
Historical population

Year	Pop.	±%
1869	6,548	—
1880	6,493	−0.8%
1890	6,449	−0.7%
1900	6,882	+6.7%
1910	6,936	+0.8%

Year	Pop.	±%
1921	6,365	−8.2%
1930	6,425	+0.9%
1950	7,207	+12.2%
1961	7,248	+0.6%
1970	7,936	+9.5%

Year	Pop.	±%
1980	10,069	+26.9%
1991	11,552	+14.7%
2001	11,736	+1.6%
2011	11,241	−4.2%
2021	10,588	−5.8%

Source: Censuses

== Economy ==
The largest employer based in the town is Assa Abloy Opening Solutions CZ, a manufacturer of locks and hinges with more than 500 employees.

== Transport ==
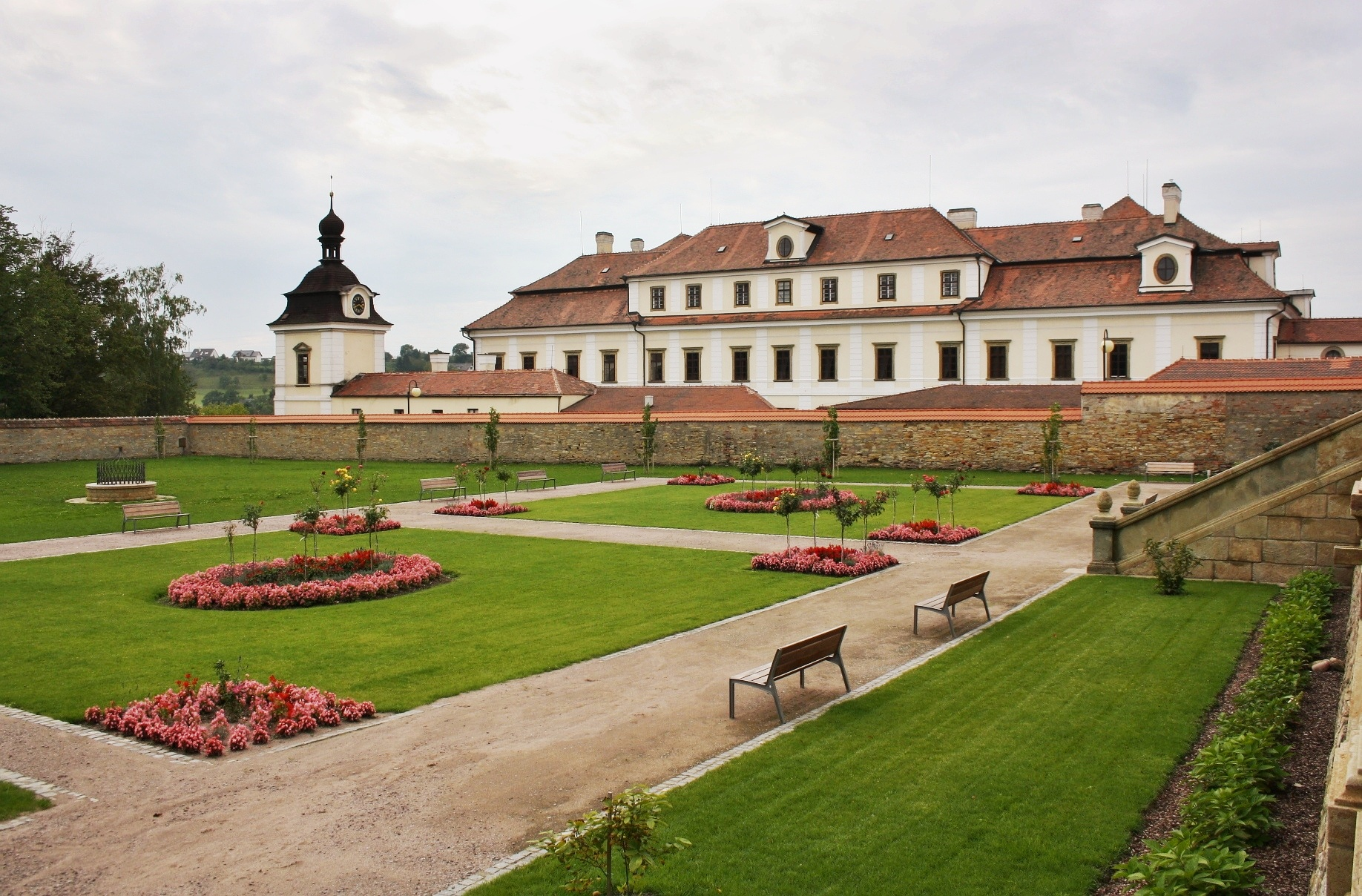
Rychnov nad Kněžnou Castle

The I/14 road (the section from Náchod to Ústí nad Orlicí) runs through the town.

Rychnov nad Kněžnou is the starting point of a short railway line of local importance heading to Častolovice and Týniště nad Orlicí.

== Sights ==
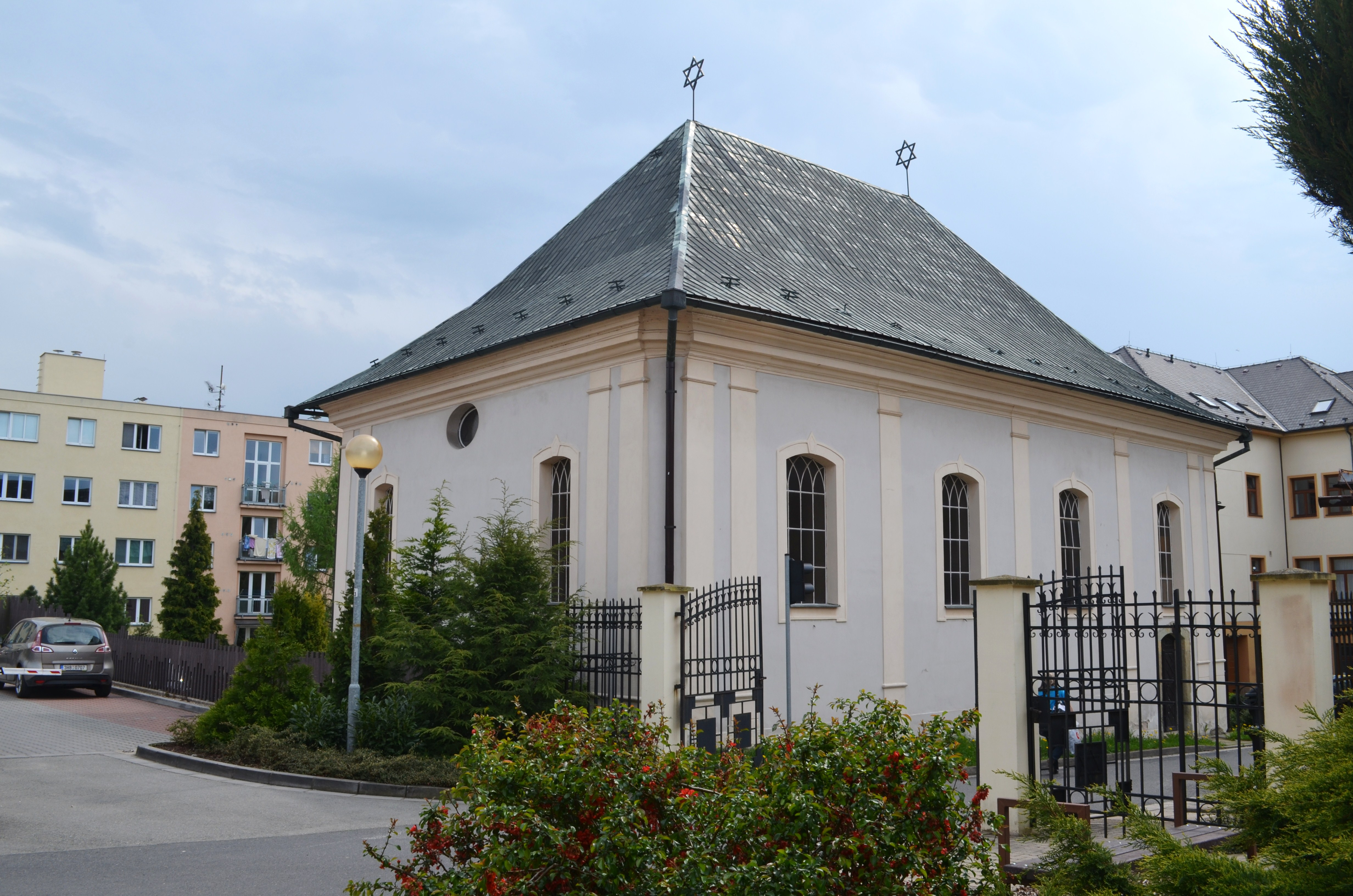
Former synagogue

Rychnov nad Kněžnou is known for the Baroque Kolowrat's castle. It contains rich collection of arts and books, and it includes the Museum and Gallery of Orlické Mountains and a castle park. The church next to the castle is Church of the Holy Trinity, which is known for the third largest bell in the country. The church is used for religious and cultural purposes.

The historic town centre is formed by the square Staré náměstí. It comprises preserved burgher houses and the former town hall, built in the Neoclassical style in 1802–1804, which serves today as the tourist information centre. Near the square is the Church of Saint Gall. It was built in the late 13th century and repaired in the pseudo-Gothic style in 1893. The bell tower was built in the pseudo-Romanesque style in 1870–1871.

The former synagogue contains Memorial of Karel Poláček, the most notable local native, and a Jewish museum.

== Notable people ==
- Jan Antonín Vocásek (1706–1757), painter
- Karel Poláček (1892–1945), writer and humourist
- Jaroslav Weigel (1931–2019), painter, actor and writer
- Alena Hromádková (1943–2024), economist and politician
- Remigius Machura (born 1960), shot putter
- Petr Stančík (born 1968), writer and poet
- Dan Vávra (born 1975), video game writer, director and designer

== Twin towns – sister cities ==
Rychnov nad Kněžnou is twinned with:

- Kłodzko, Poland
