= Orlické Mountains =

Mountain range in the Czech Republic and Poland

- Orlice Mountains, Eagle Mountains
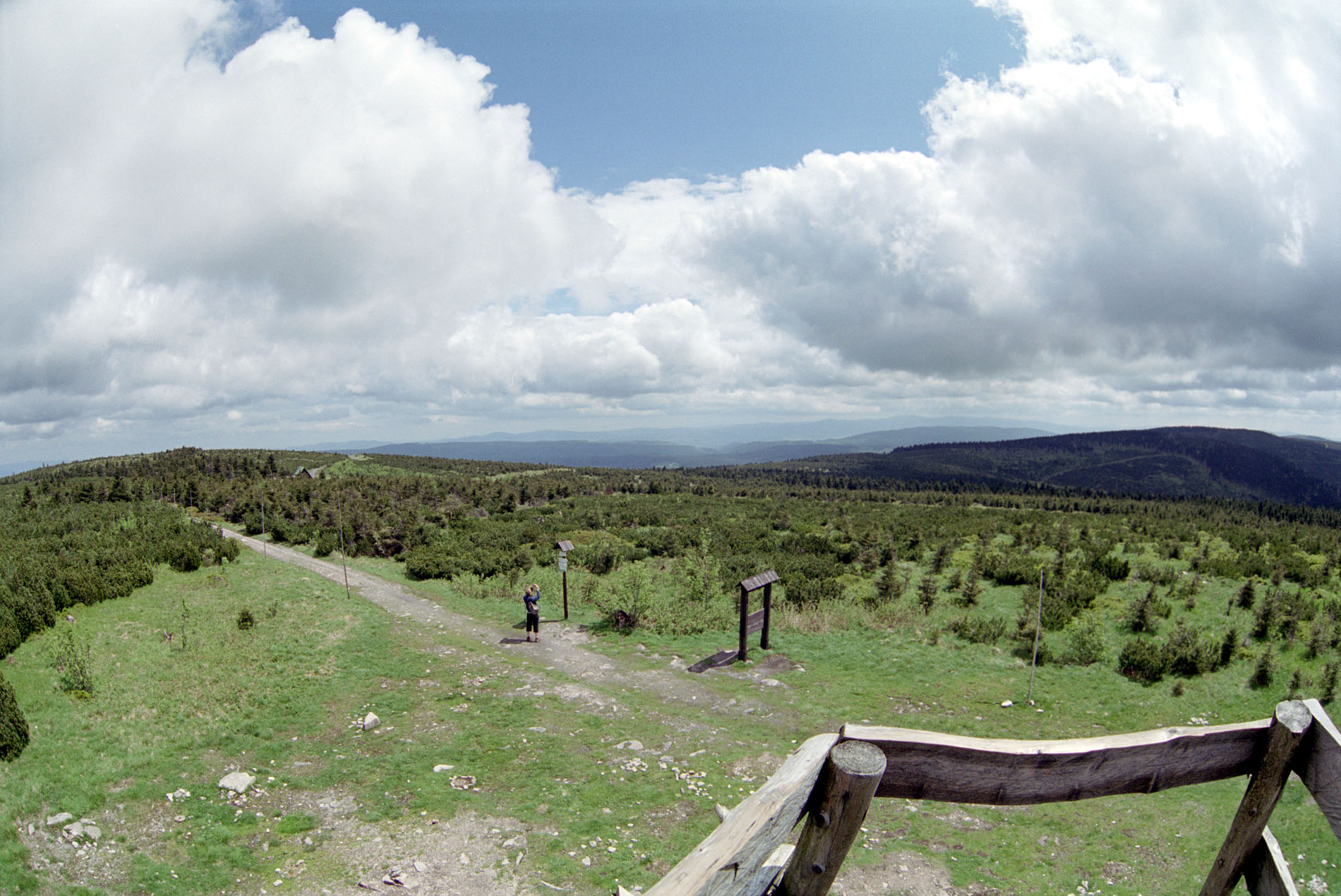
- View from Velká Deštná

Highest point
- Peak: Velká Deštná
- Elevation: 1,116 m (3,661 ft)
- Coordinates: 50°18′18″N 16°23′57″E

Dimensions
- Length: 50 km (31 mi)
- Width: 8 km (5.0 mi)
- Area: 341 km^{2} (132 mi^{2})

Geography
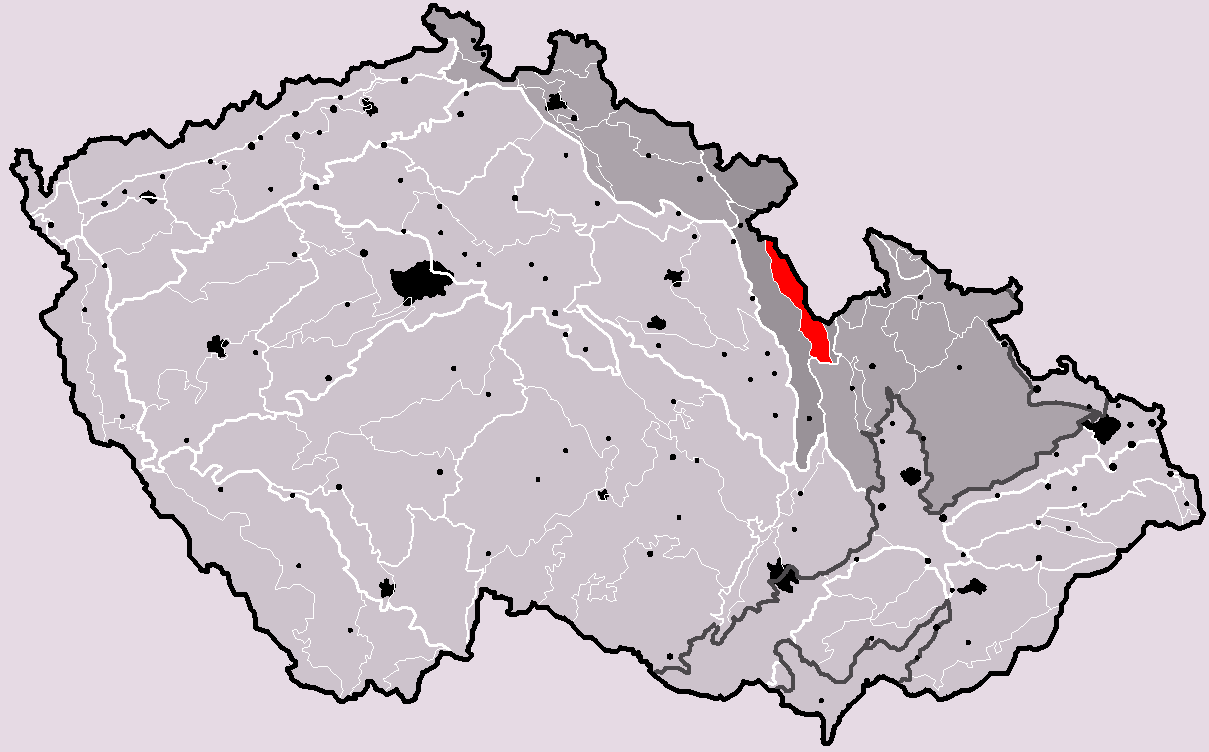
- Orlické Mountains in the geomorphological system of the Czech Republic
- Countries: Czech Republic; Poland
- Regions/ Voivodeships: Hradec Králové, Pardubice/ Lower Silesian
- Range coordinates: 50°10′N 16°33′E
- Parent range: Central Sudetes

The Orlické Mountains (also called Orlice Mountains or Eagle Mountains; Czech: Orlické hory, Polish: Góry Orlickie, German: Adlergebirge) are a mountain range located mainly in northeastern Bohemia in the Czech Republic. It is a mesoregion of the Central Sudetes. They follow the border with Kłodzko Land in Poland for 40 km (25 mi). The highest point in the range is Velká Deštná at 1,116 m (3,661 ft).

== Geology ==
The mountains are mainly composed of crystalline rocks, consistent with the makeup of the northern rim of the highlands of Bohemia.

== Tourism ==
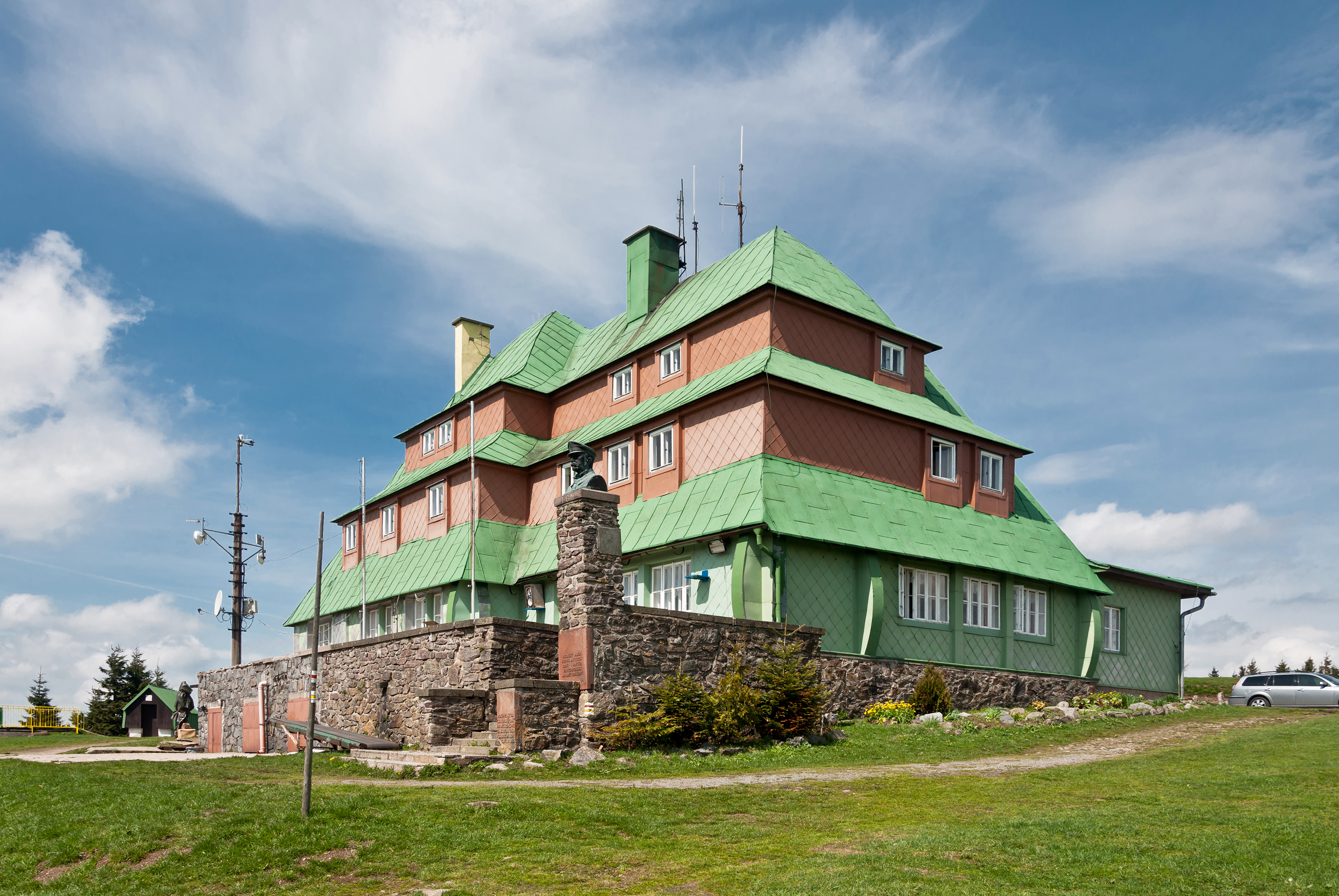
Shelter Masarykova Chata

The entire region has maintained its original natural character over the centuries and so beech primeval forests, protected landscape areas or nature parks and reserves are interwoven with trails, right next to chateaux and town parks and groomed rural gardens. The gentle rolling hills are interlaced with hiking trails, a dense network of cycle trails and routes leading along rivers.

== Protection ==
Most of the Orlické Mountains are part of the Orlické hory Protected Landscape Area (CHKO Orlické hory), a protected landscape area of 204 km^{2} established in 1969.

== History ==
Until 1945 the Orlické Mountains were predominantly German populated, the population was expropriated and expelled. Subsequently, new citizens moved here from the Czech lands.

== Gallery ==
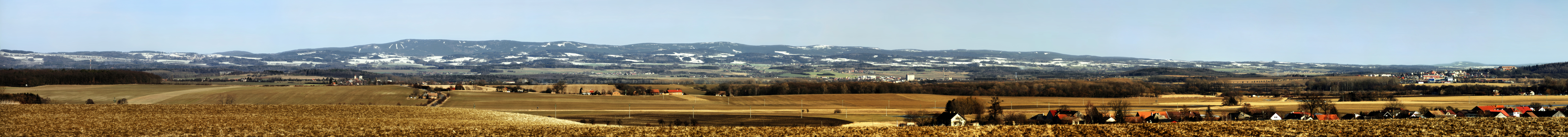
Panorama of the Orlické Mountains from the south
