= Zachlumi =

Zachlumi may refer to:

- Zachlumi, medieval South Slavic people of the land of Zachlumia
- Záchlumí (Tachov District), a municipality and village in the Plzeň Region
- Záchlumí (Ústí nad Orlicí District), a municipality and village in the Pardubice Region
