= Záchlumí =

Záchlumí may refer to places in the Czech Republic:

- Záchlumí (Tachov District), a municipality and village in the Plzeň Region
- Záchlumí (Ústí nad Orlicí District), a municipality and village in the Pardubice Region
