= Horní Jelení =

- Town
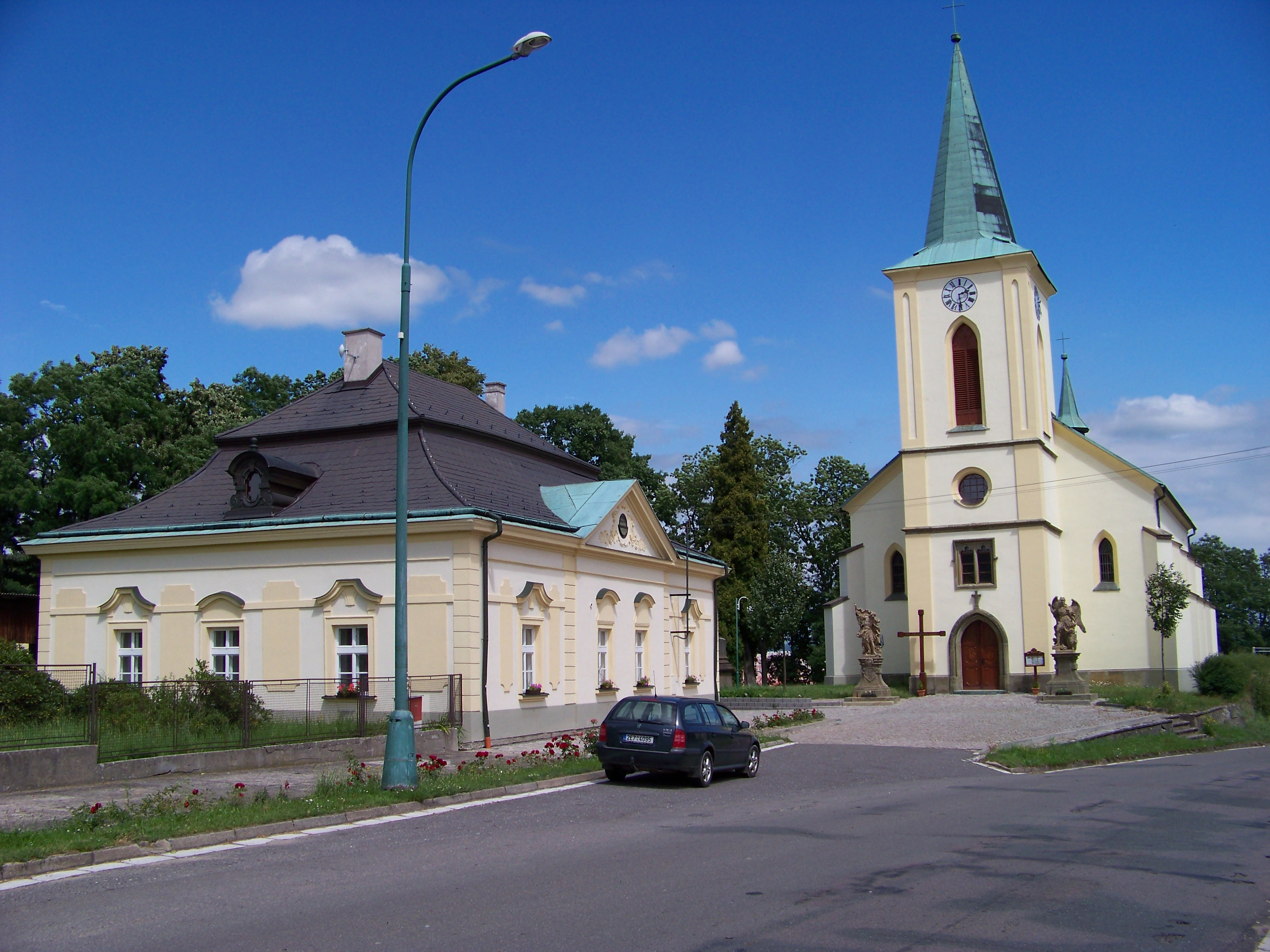
- Church of the Holy Trinity and the rectory

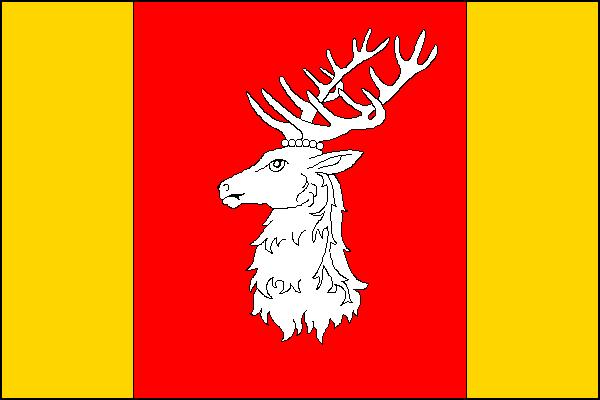
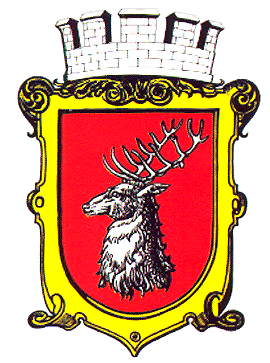
- Flag Coat of arms

- Location in the Czech Republic
- Coordinates: 50°2′57″N 16°5′3″E
- Country: Czech Republic
- Region: Pardubice
- District: Pardubice
- First mentioned: 1472

Government
  - Mayor: Petr Tupec

Area
  - Total: 24.48 km^{2} (9.45 sq mi)
- Elevation: 305 m (1,001 ft)

Population (2026-01-01)
  - Total: 2,149
  - Density: 87.79/km^{2} (227.4/sq mi)
- Time zone: UTC+1 (CET)
  - Summer (DST): UTC+2 (CEST)
- Postal codes: 533 74, 534 01
- Website: www.hornijeleni.cz

Horní Jelení (Czech pronunciation: [ˈɦorɲiː ˈjɛlɛɲiː]) is a town in Pardubice District in the Pardubice Region of the Czech Republic. It has about 2,100 inhabitants.

== Administrative division ==
Horní Jelení consists of three municipal parts (in brackets population according to the 2021 census):

- Horní Jelení (1,898)
- Dolní Jelení (124)
- Rousínov (15)

== Etymology ==
The name Jelení, derived from the Czech word jelen ('red deer') was transferred to the setttlement from the forests in the area. In 1577 at the latest, two settlements began to be distinguished: Horní Jelení ('upper Jelení') and Dolní Jelení ('lower jelení').

== Geography ==
Horní Jelení is located about 21 kilometres (13 mi) east of Pardubice. It lies in a flat landscape in the Orlice Table. The stream Ředický potok flows through the town. The area is rich in brooks and small fishponds.

== History ==
The first written mention of Horní Jelení is from 1472. It is a document that describes the division of property after the death of George of Poděbrady between his sons, and according to which Horní Jelení was part of the Litice estate, which fell to Boček IV of Poděbrady. In 1483, he gave the Litice estate to his brother Henry the Younger of Poděbrady. He fell into debt and sold the estate to the Pernštejn family in 1495. Vilém II of Pernštejn founded several fishponds around Horní Jelení. In 1555, Horní Jelení was promoted to a market town.

The Pernštejns sold Horní Jelení in 1556 to Ernest of Bavaria, but he immediately began to sell off the estate piece by piece. In 1573, Horní Jelení was acquired by the Bubna of Litice family, which owned it until 1790. In 1912, Emperor Franz Joseph I promoted Horní Jelení to a town.

== Demographics ==
Historical population

Year	Pop.	±%
1869	2,156	—
1880	2,190	+1.6%
1890	2,220	+1.4%
1900	2,112	−4.9%
1910	2,276	+7.8%

Year	Pop.	±%
1921	2,340	+2.8%
1930	2,407	+2.9%
1950	1,956	−18.7%
1961	1,956	+0.0%
1970	1,837	−6.1%

Year	Pop.	±%
1980	1,757	−4.4%
1991	1,508	−14.2%
2001	1,685	+11.7%
2011	1,942	+15.3%
2021	2,037	+4.9%

Source: Censuses

== Transport ==
The I/36 road, which connects Pardubice with Rychnov nad Kněžnou District, runs along the northwestern municipal border.

== Sights ==
The main landmark of Horní Jelení is the Church of the Holy Trinity. It is a valuable neo-Gothic church, built in 1864–1866. There are several Baroque statues in front of the church. Next to the church is a Baroque rectory from the 18th century.

== Notable people ==
- Karel Kaplan (1928–2023), historian
