= Koloveč =

- Market town
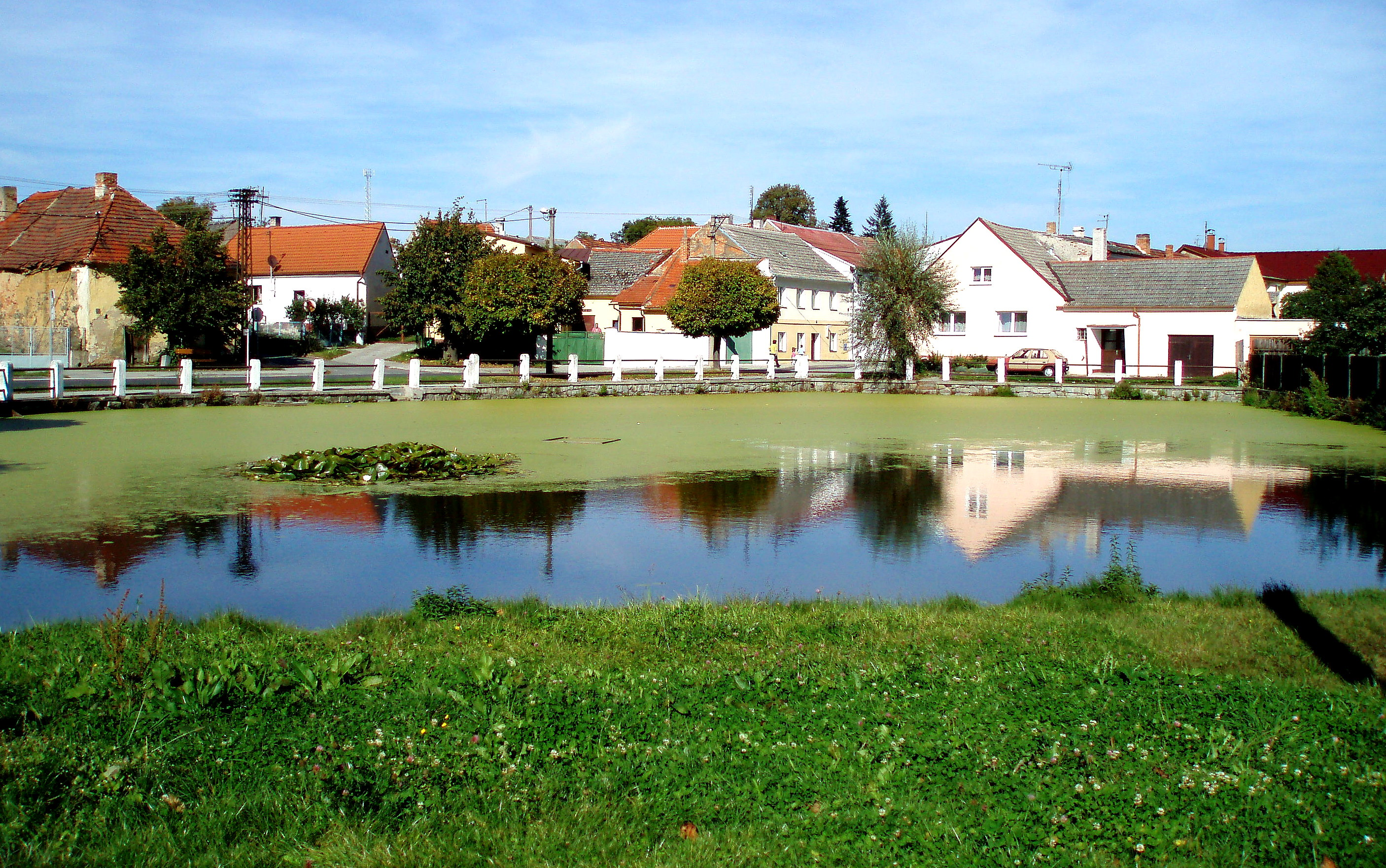
- Pond in Koloveč

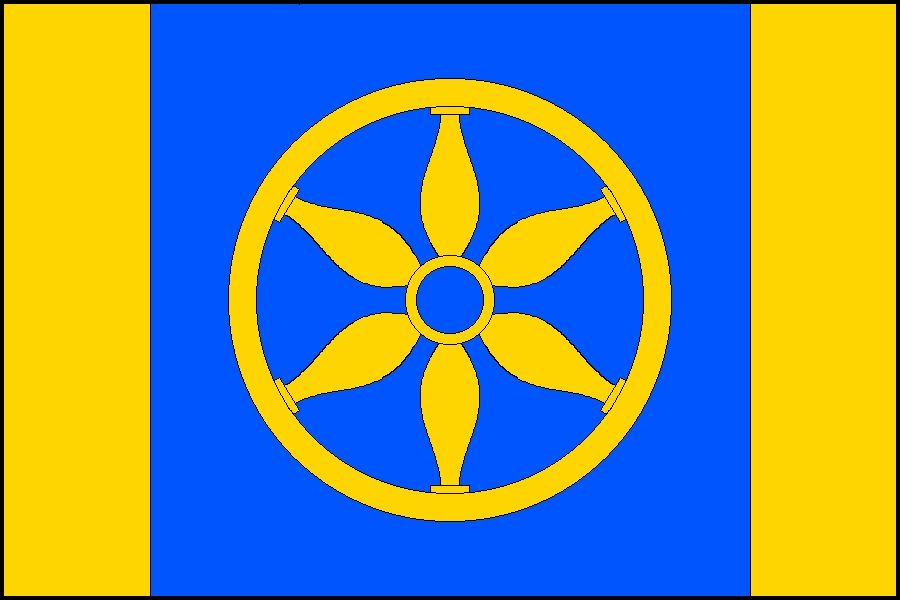
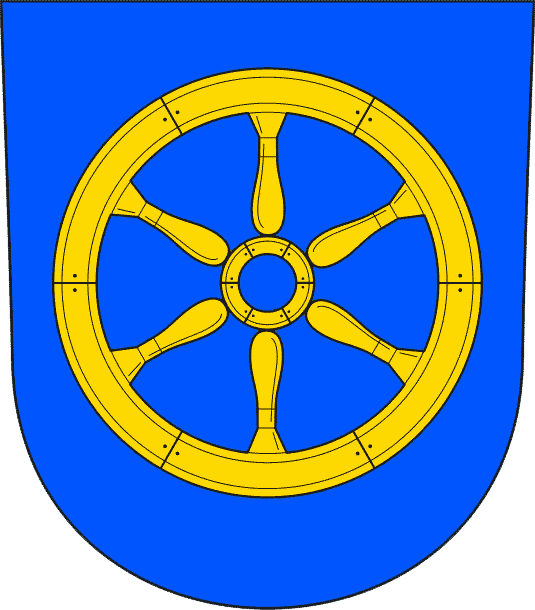
- Flag Coat of arms

- Location in the Czech Republic
- Coordinates: 49°29′15″N 13°6′27″E
- Country: Czech Republic
- Region: Plzeň
- District: Domažlice
- First mentioned: 1197

Area
  - Total: 13.76 km^{2} (5.31 sq mi)
- Elevation: 452 m (1,483 ft)

Population (2026-01-01)
  - Total: 1,011
  - Density: 73.47/km^{2} (190.3/sq mi)
- Time zone: UTC+1 (CET)
  - Summer (DST): UTC+2 (CEST)
- Postal code: 345 43
- Website: www.mestyskolovec.cz

Koloveč (Czech pronunciation: [ˈkolovɛtʃ]) is a market town in Domažlice District in the Plzeň Region of the Czech Republic. It has about 1,000 inhabitants.

== Administrative division ==
Koloveč consists of two municipal parts (in brackets population according to the 2021 census):

- Koloveč (957)
- Zichov (38)

== Etymology ==
The name Koloveč is derived from the personal name Kolovec, meaning "Kolovec's (court)".

== Geography ==
Koloveč is located about 14 kilometres (9 mi) east of Domažlice and 33 km (21 mi) southwest of Plzeň. It lies mostly in the Švihov Highland, only a small part of the municipal territory in the north extends into the Plasy Uplands. The highest point is the hill Radlice at 604 m (1,982 ft) above sea level. The Merklínka Stream flows along the eastern municipal border.

== History ==
The first written mention of Koloveč is in a donation deed of Prague bishop Bretislav III from 1197, when it became a property of the convent in Doksany. The village was owned by the convent until 1421, when the convent was burned down by the Hussites. Until 1491, Koloveč was a royal property. From 1491 to 1580, it was owned by the Lords of Roupov. During their rule, a manor house and a brewery were built and Koloveč was promoted to a market town (in 1549 at the latest).

In 1580–1664, Koloveč was owned by the Knights of Žákava. The market town was looted by the Swedish troops in 1641 (during the Thirty Years' War), which caused poverty in the following decades. In 1664–1711, Koloveč was owned by the Bubna of Litice family. From 1711 until the establishment of an independent municipality in 1850, it was a property of the Czernin family.

== Demographics ==
Historical population

Year	Pop.	±%
1869	1,362	—
1880	1,566	+15.0%
1890	1,482	−5.4%
1900	1,489	+0.5%
1910	1,627	+9.3%

Year	Pop.	±%
1921	1,496	−8.1%
1930	1,466	−2.0%
1950	1,085	−26.0%
1961	1,091	+0.6%
1970	987	−9.5%

Year	Pop.	±%
1980	1,008	+2.1%
1991	946	−6.2%
2001	980	+3.6%
2011	987	+0.7%
2021	995	+0.8%

Source: Censuses

== Transport ==
There are no railways or major roads passing through the municipality.

== Sights ==
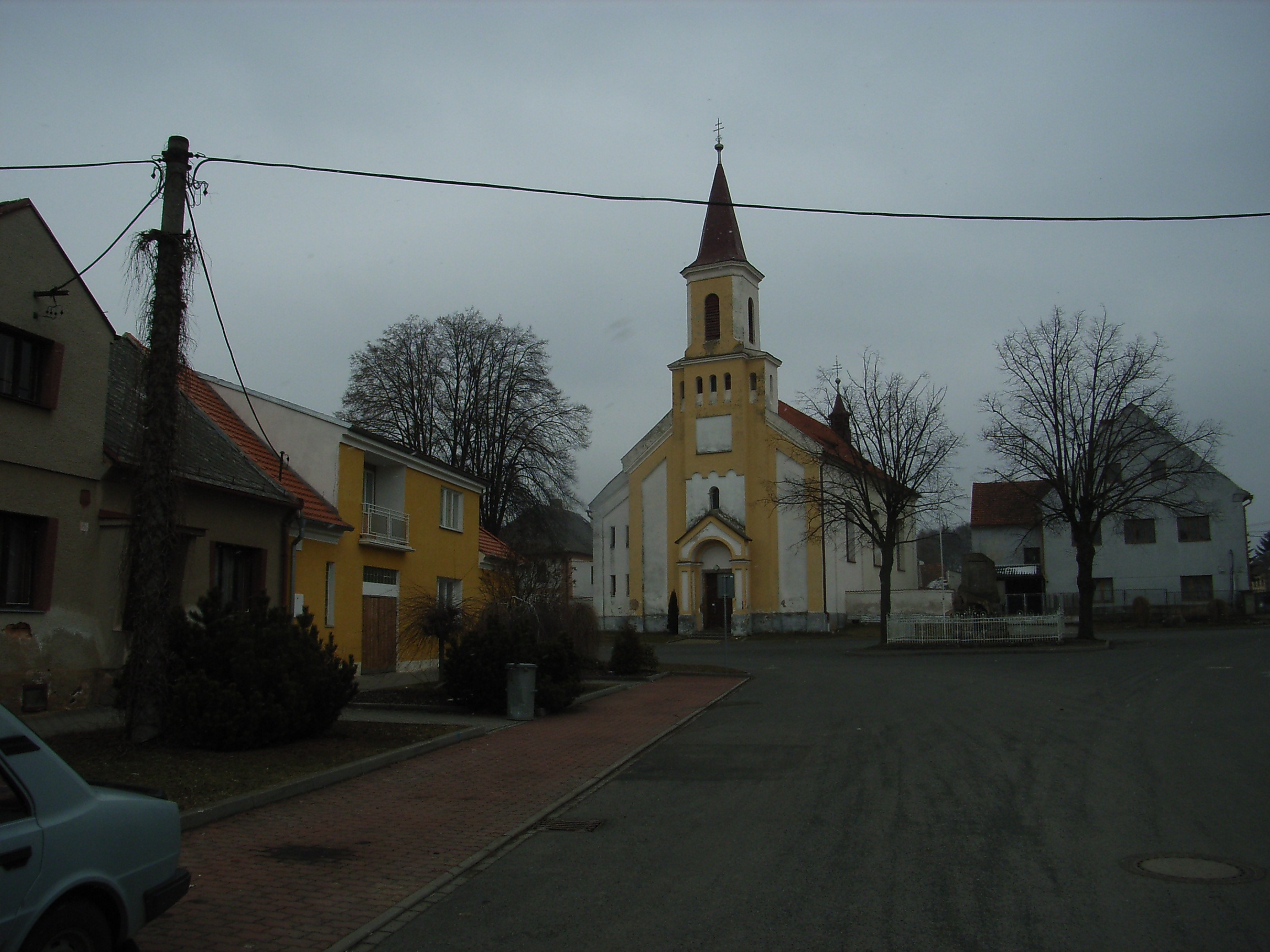
Church of the Annunciation of the Virgin Mary

The main landmark of Koloveč is the Church of the Annunciation of the Virgin Mary. It was originally a Gothic church from the 14th century. In 1731, after it was damaged by a fire, it was rebuilt in the Baroque style with the participation of the architect František Maxmilián Kaňka. Its current form is a result of the reconstruction in 1867–1891.
