= Doudleby nad Orlicí =

- Market town
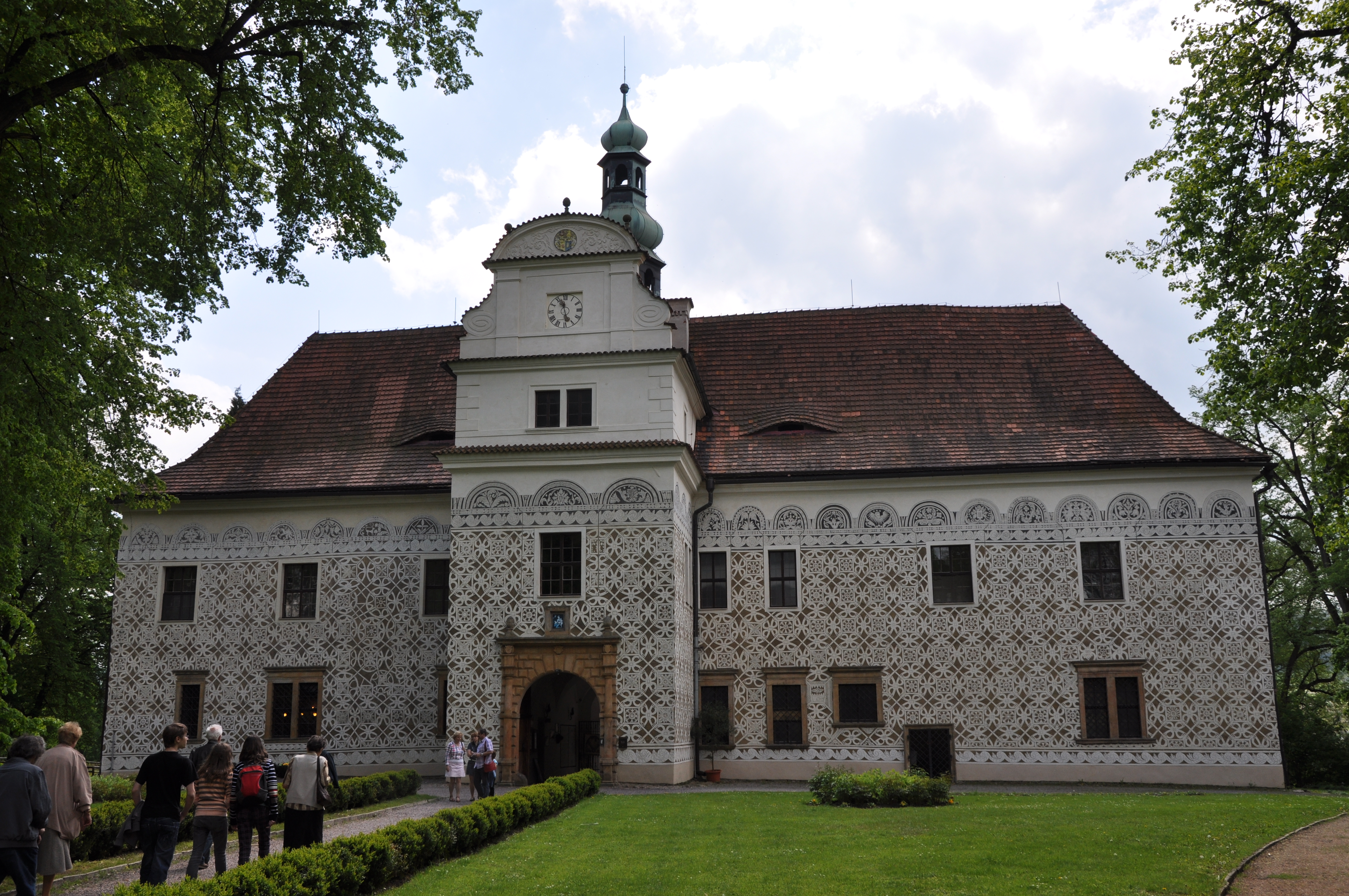
- Doudleby nad Orlicí Castle

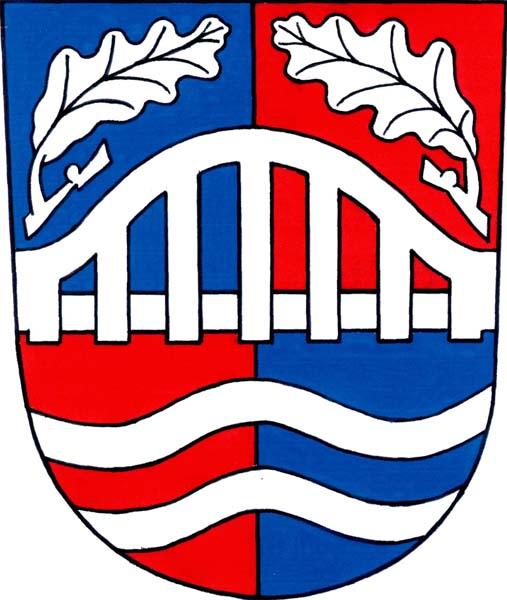
- Flag Coat of arms

- Location in the Czech Republic
- Coordinates: 50°6′27″N 16°15′41″E
- Country: Czech Republic
- Region: Hradec Králové
- District: Rychnov nad Kněžnou
- First mentioned: 1259

Area
  - Total: 8.90 km^{2} (3.44 sq mi)
- Elevation: 281 m (922 ft)

Population (2026-01-01)
  - Total: 1,791
  - Density: 201/km^{2} (521/sq mi)
- Time zone: UTC+1 (CET)
  - Summer (DST): UTC+2 (CEST)
- Postal code: 517 42
- Website: www.doudleby.cz

Doudleby nad Orlicí (Czech pronunciation: [ˈdoudlɛbɪ ˈnat orlɪtsiː]; German: Daudleb an der Adler) is a market town in Rychnov nad Kněžnou District in the Hradec Králové Region of the Czech Republic. It has about 1,800 inhabitants.

== Administrative division ==
Doudleby nad Orlicí consists of two municipal parts (in brackets population according to the 2021 census):

- Doudleby nad Orlicí (1,522)
- Vyhnánov (177)

== Geography ==
Doudleby nad Orlicí is located about 6 kilometres (4 mi) south of Rychnov nad Kněžnou and 31 km (19 mi) east of Hradec Králové. It lies mostly in the Orlice Table, only the southern part of the municipal territory extends into the Svitavy Uplands. The highest point is at 458 m (1,503 ft) above sea level. The Divoká Orlice River flows through the market town. The Zdobnice River enters to the municipal territory in the east and then joins the Divoká Orlice.

== History ==
The first written mention of Doudleby nad Orlicí is in a deed of King Ottokar II from 1259. Until 1562, the owners often changed. From 1562 to 1809, Doudleby was a property of the Bubna of Litice family. They had built here a castle. In the 18th and 19th centuries, a Jewish community existed in the village. After the large fire in 1860, which destroyed half of the Jewish ghetto, most of the Jewish families moved away.

In 1931, Doudleby nad Orlicí was promoted to a market town.

== Demographics ==
Historical population

Year	Pop.	±%
1869	1,257	—
1880	1,672	+33.0%
1890	1,817	+8.7%
1900	2,013	+10.8%
1910	2,375	+18.0%

Year	Pop.	±%
1921	2,243	−5.6%
1930	2,500	+11.5%
1950	1,903	−23.9%
1961	2,084	+9.5%
1970	2,012	−3.5%

Year	Pop.	±%
1980	2,108	+4.8%
1991	1,887	−10.5%
2001	1,935	+2.5%
2011	1,820	−5.9%
2021	1,699	−6.6%

Source: Censuses

== Transport ==
Doudleby nad Orlicí is located on the railway lines Hradec Králové–Letohrad and Týniště nad Orlicí–Rokytnice v Orlických horách.

== Sights ==
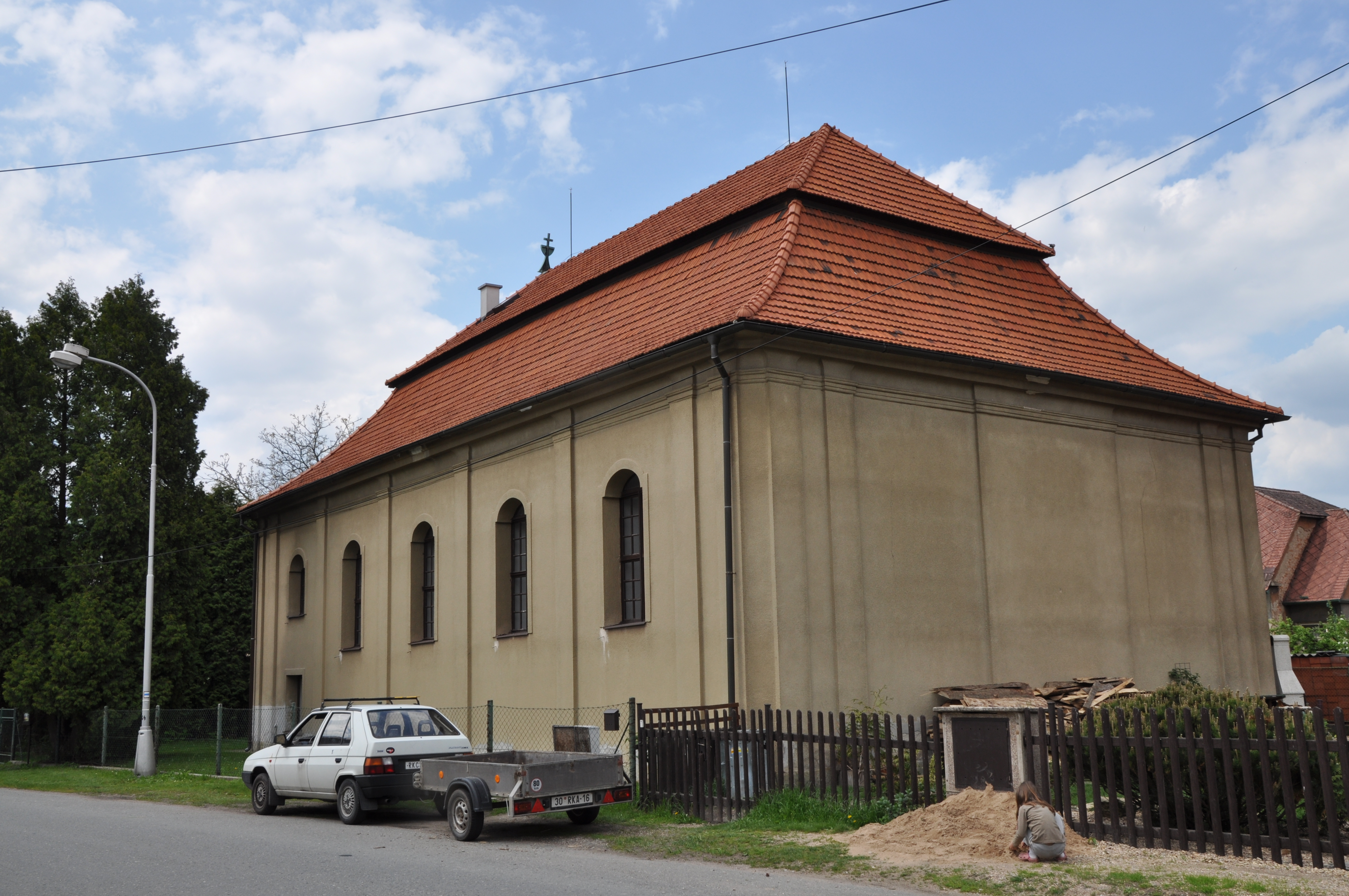
Former synagogue

The main landmark is the Doudleby nad Orlicí Castle. It was built in the Renaissance style around 1590, on the site of an older fortress. Around 1670, it was modified in the early Baroque style. Today it is open to the public.

The synagogue was built in the late Baroque style in 1777. Since 2002, the building has been used by the Czechoslovak Hussite Church.

== Notable people ==
- Petra Bryant, British-American actress and writer
