= Karel Kaplan =

Czech historian (1928–2023)

Karel Kaplan (28 August 1928 – 12 March 2023) was a Czech historian. He specialized in the World War II and post-World War II periods in Czechoslovakia. He wrote books about Czech political trials during the 1950s, the situation of Jews in Central Europe during World War II, and the Communist takeover in Czechoslovakia.

== Biography ==
Kaplan was born in Horní Jelení in 1928. During the Prague Spring in 1968, he worked for the Committee of Rehabilitation where he was able to access classified documents of the Czechoslovak Communist Party. After the end of Prague Spring, Kaplan fell into disfavor. He worked in a factory from 1972 to 1976, and in 1976 asked for political asylum in Munich. After his exile he published documents on secret Soviet activities, which were serialised in the Italian magazine Panorama. Kaplan claimed he had discovered files that described a secret meeting in the Kremlin in January 1951, where Joseph Stalin announced his plan for a war with the United States within three or four years, with the aim of driving the Americans out of Europe. In 1990, Kaplan returned to Czechoslovakia and continued his academic research in Prague.

Kaplan died on 12 March 2023, at age 94.

== Awards ==
- Medal of Merit

== Selected translated works ==
- Dans les Archives du Comité Central: Trente ans de secrets du bloc soviétique, 1978, ISBN 978-2-226-00711-7.
- The Short March: The Communist takeover in Czechoslovakia 1945-1948, 1987, ISBN 0-312-72209-5.
- Report on the Murder of the General Secretary, April 1990
  - Zpráva o zavraždění generálního tajemníka, 1992 (in Czech)
