= Bubna of Litice =

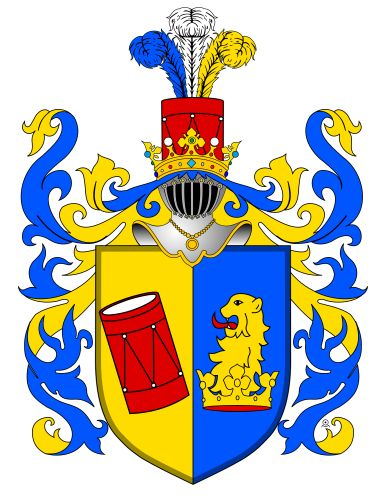
Coat of arms of Bubna-Litic family

The House of Bubna-Litic (German: Bubna von Lititz) or Bubna of Litice, (Czech: Bubnové z Litic) is a Czech noble family dating back to the 14th century.

== History ==
Originally members of lower nobility (vladyka) from the castle of Buben in western Bohemia. The house rose to prominence following the acquisition of the Litice Castle in 1562. The castles of Doudleby and Žamberk were built by Mikuláš the elder of Bubna at the end of the 16th century and became the family seat. However, the house is mentioned in historical records dating back to the late 14th century. Allegedly, there are mentions of the name in the 12th century. In 1415 two family lines emerged, the Warlich of Bubna and the Bubna of Litice.

The Bohemian Revolt (1618–1620) had a mixed influence on the house and resulted in loss of property. Jan Varlich of Bubna was forced to flee the country with the Winter King Frederick V. However, a different part of the house was later granted the title of count. The Coat of Arms of the Counts of Bubna-Litice depicts a drum (Czech: buben) and a lion with a King's crown which represented allegiance to Emperor Ferdinand II. The lion is connected to the family legend which describes Heřman of Bubna as a traveler who found himself a fellow lion.

The counts of Bubna increased their lands and were arguably most prosperous in the 18th century. Several castles and churches were built in this era. Nevertheless, due to debt the house lost most of its property in 1809. The political influence of the family ended with the abolition of aristocratic titles in 1918. The last important role was in the Protectorate when Mikuláš of Bubna-Litice was a minister in the government of Alois Eliáš. Aristocracy was persecuted after the Communist 1948 coup d'état.

== Notable members ==
- Heřman of Bubna (?–1602), according to the legend was accompanied on his journeys by a loyal lion. He is portrayed next to George of Poděbrady across the National Gallery building in Holešovice. Because he used to own the lands there a nearby street Heřmanova is named after him.
- Jan Varlich of Bubna (?–1636), General-Wachtmeister of the Bohemian Estates army during the Bohemian Revolt. Conspired with Jindřich Matyáš Thurn and Albrecht von Wallenstein.
- Jindřich Jan (1596–1653), was the first to hold the Count title.
- Ferdinand, Graf Bubna von Littitz (1768–1825), field marshal lieutenant of the Imperial Austrian Army, liberator of Geneva in 1813. Austrian commander and diplomat in the Napoleonic Wars.
- Mikuláš of Bubna-Litice (1897–1954), Minister of Agriculture in the Nazi-occupied Czechoslovakia. Played a role in reducing the damage to Czechoslovakia.

== Historical properties ==
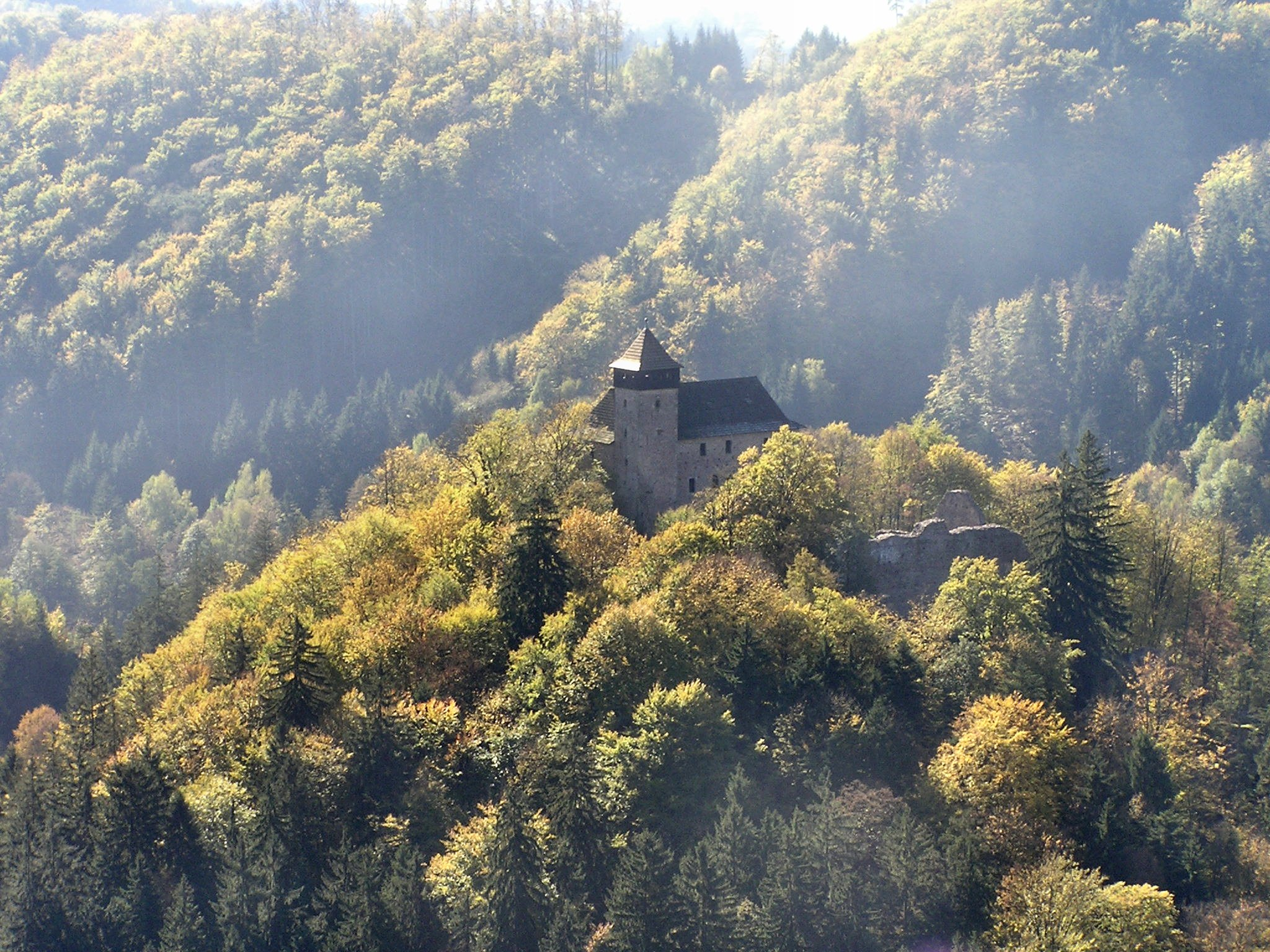
Litice Castle in Litice nad Orlicí near Žamberk

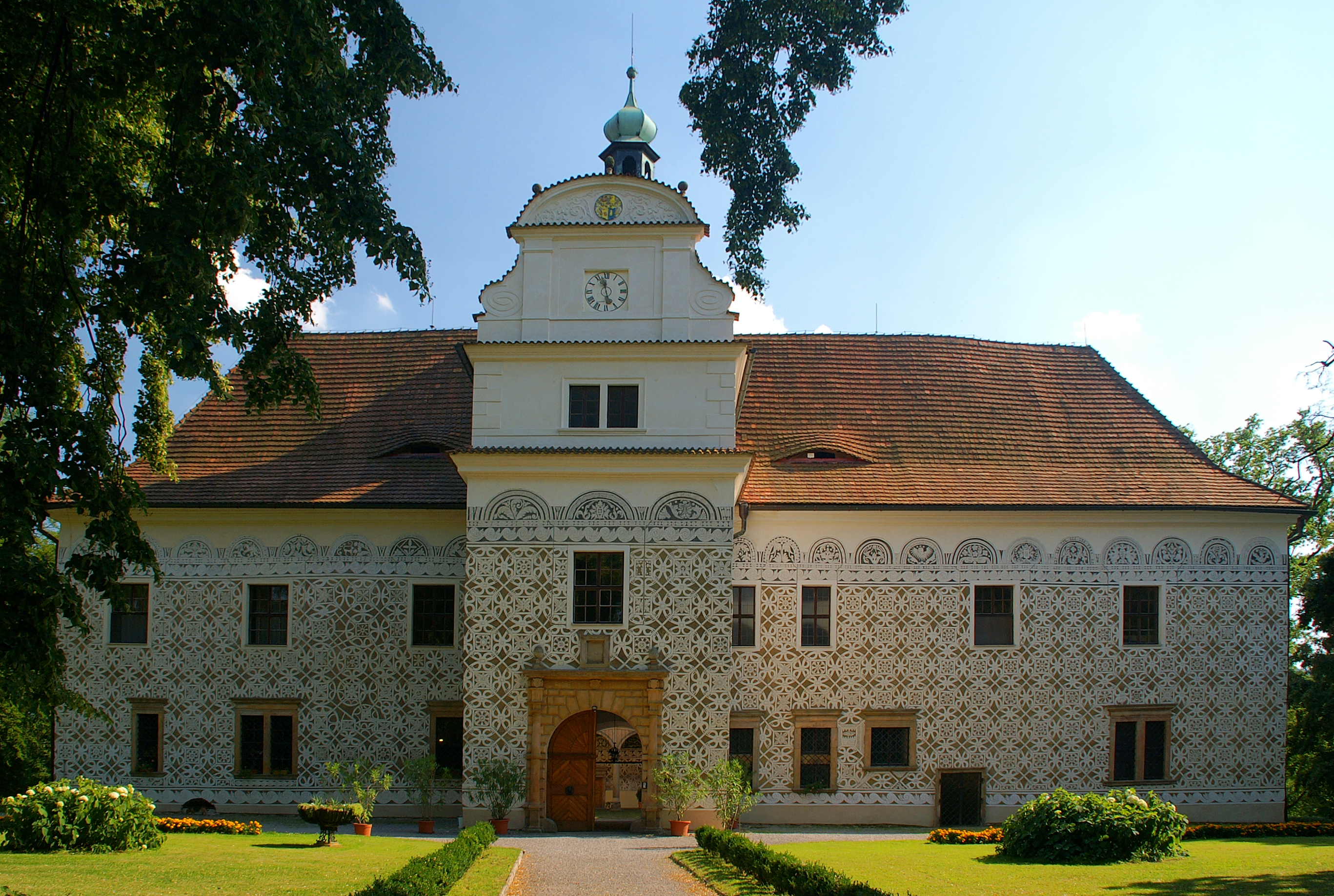
Castle in Doudleby nad Orlicí

The properties of the House of Bubna-Litice are mainly located in the Pardubice Region. Only the castles of Doudleby and Horní Jelení remain in the family today. Throughout history the family is known to have held:

- Buben Castle near Plešnice
- Litice Castle
- Žamberk Castle
- Doudleby nad Orlicí Castle
- Kokořín Manor
- Horní Jelení
- Březno
- Křtiny
- Houses on Celetná 11,14 and 15 in Prague
