= Plešnice =

- Municipality
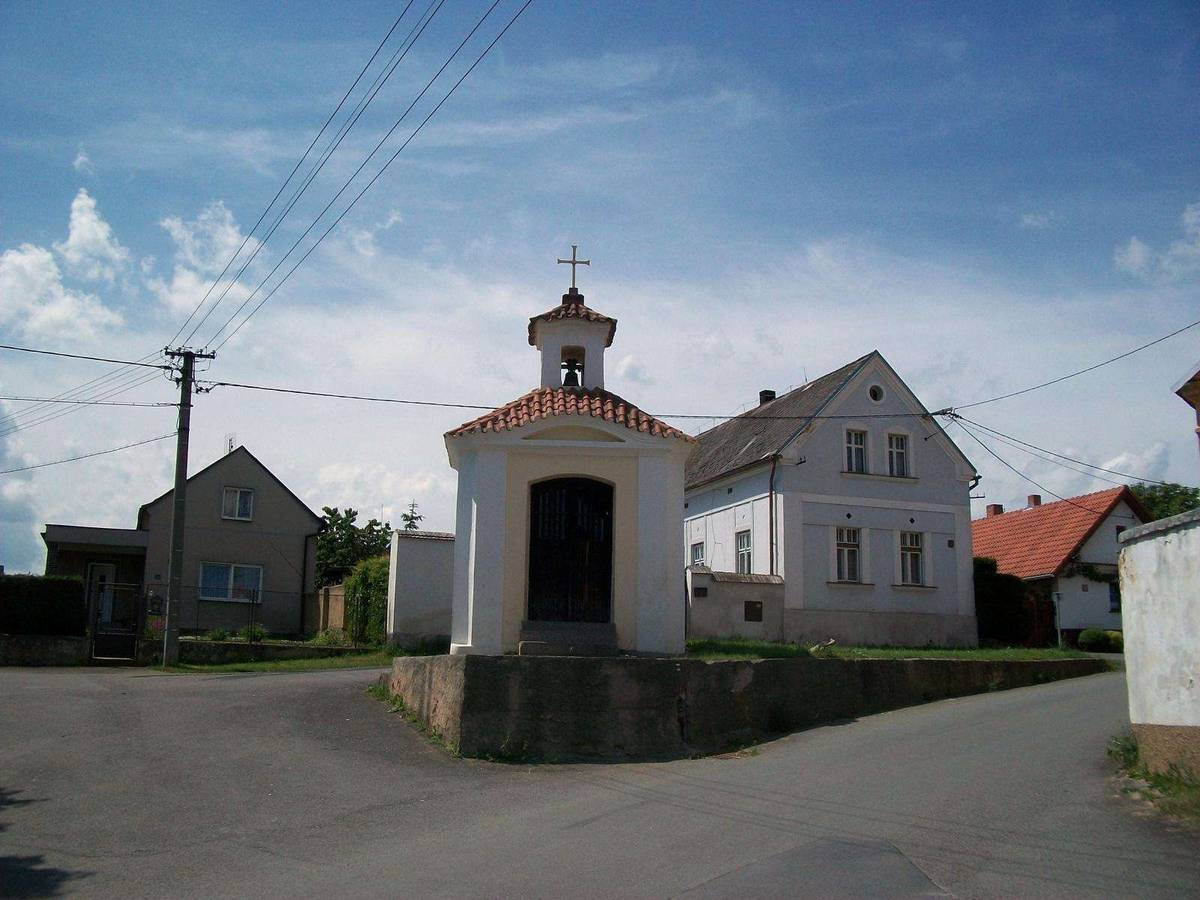
- Chapel of the Holy Trinity

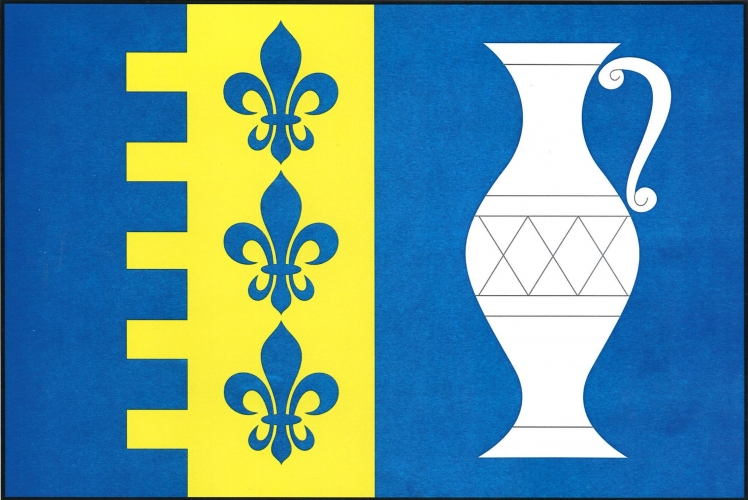
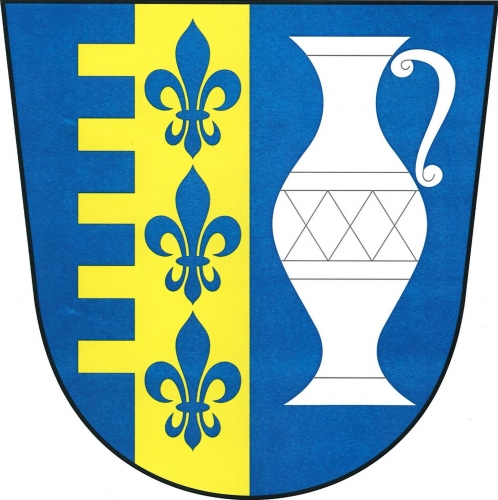
- Flag Coat of arms

- Location in the Czech Republic
- Coordinates: 49°46′27″N 13°10′36″E
- Country: Czech Republic
- Region: Plzeň
- District: Plzeň-North
- First mentioned: 1357

Area
  - Total: 6.87 km^{2} (2.65 sq mi)
- Elevation: 387 m (1,270 ft)

Population (2026-01-01)
  - Total: 284
  - Density: 41.3/km^{2} (107/sq mi)
- Time zone: UTC+1 (CET)
  - Summer (DST): UTC+2 (CEST)
- Postal code: 330 33
- Website: www.plesnice.cz

Plešnice is a municipality and village in Plzeň-North District in the Plzeň Region of the Czech Republic. It has about 300 inhabitants.

Plešnice lies approximately 14 kilometres (9 mi) west of Plzeň and 96 km (60 mi) west of Prague.

== Demographics ==
Historical population
Year	Pop.	±%
1869	275	—
1880	277	+0.7%
1890	296	+6.9%
1900	310	+4.7%
1910	380	+22.6%
1921	374	−1.6%
1930	386	+3.2%
1950	245	−36.5%
1961	267	+9.0%
1970	260	−2.6%
1980	241	−7.3%
1991	238	−1.2%
2001	233	−2.1%
2011	260	+11.6%
2021	274	+5.4%
Source: Censuses
