= Litice Castle =

Czech Republic castle

Coordinates: 50°05′09″N 16°21′06″E

Litice Castle (German: Litiz) is a castle in the Záchlumí municipality in the Ústí nad Orlicí District in the Pardubice Region of the Czech Republic.

The town of Lititz, Pennsylvania, United States, was named after the castle by members of the Moravian Church.

== History ==
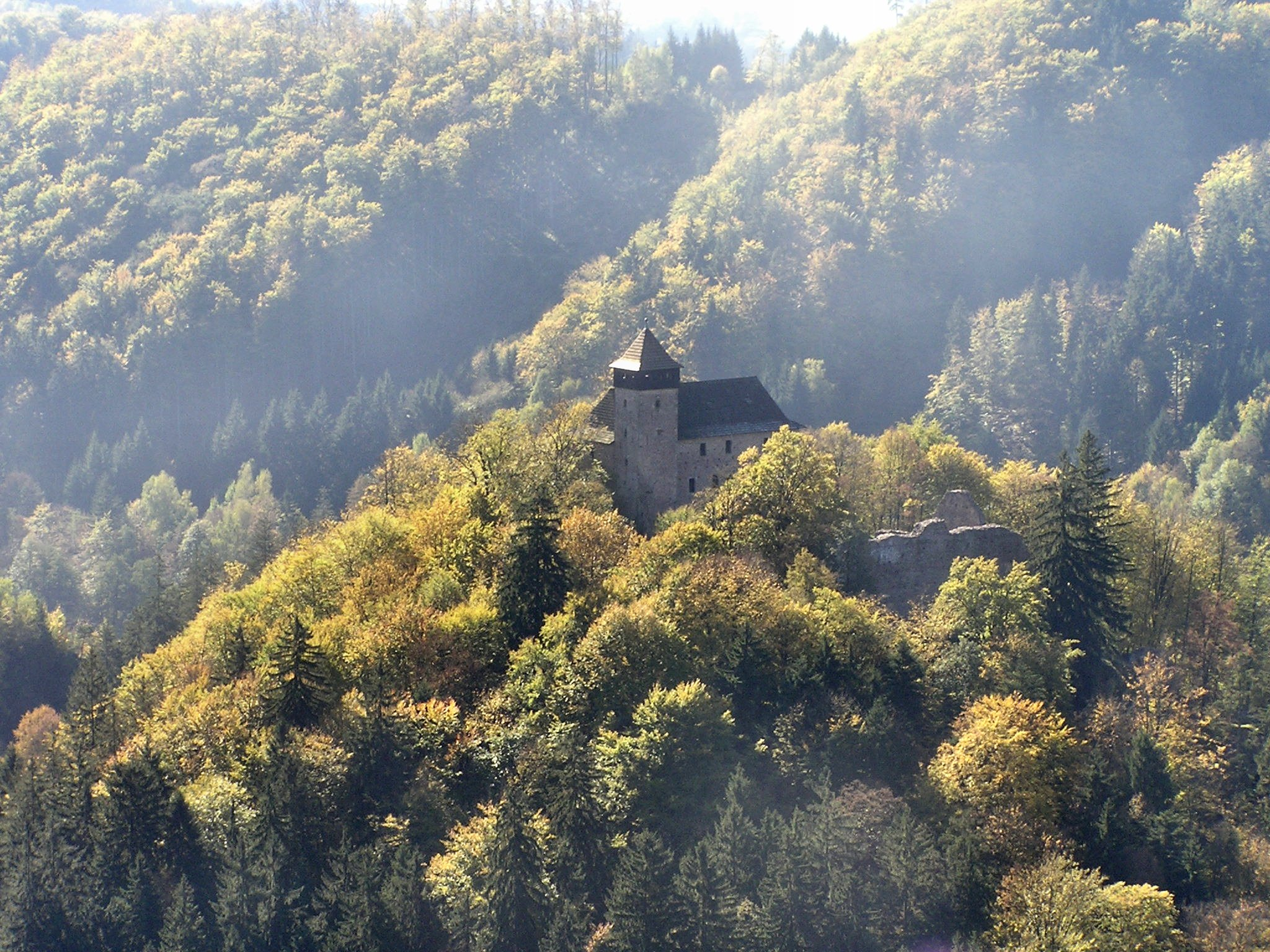
Litice Castle

The steep slopes of the foothills of the Orlické Mountains gave the advantage of a strategic position to the Gothic castles founded there at the close of the 13th century. The high headland around which flowed the Divoká Orlice River was the site chosen just before 1300 by the Drslavic family to construct a castle that they named after their original family settlement in the Plzeň area. For a short span in the 14th century, Litice castle was owned by two Luxembourg successive rulers, John of Bohemia and Charles IV. In 1371, Moravian noble Boček of Kunštát settled with his family there. One branch became naturalized in Bohemia through marriage and the purchase of the Poděbrady and Pardubice estates.

The appearance of the oldest Gothic castle was changed by construction in 1450 by George of Poděbrady, later King of Bohemia. The former gothic likeness can be seen only in the castle's two-palace core, resembling similar architecture applied to Helfenberk and Menstein.

Turbulent times followed the Hussite Wars, rife with internal conflicts between alliances of the aristocrats fighting for power in the Bohemia. One of the factions was the Utraquist party of George of Poděbrady, who called for essential measures to safeguard this castle. George's reign from 1458 brought peace and quiet for a time. This was interrupted in the mid 1460s by a war caused by the Papal Court instigating the resistance of the local catholic nobility and then asking Matthias Corvinus, the King of Hungary, to intervene.

The external system of fortifications, mostly still preserved, shows the partial use of artillery to defend the castle. This was due to favourable terrain, which reduced the need for elaborate fortifications and cannon bastions to a minimum and to the generally obsolete concept.

The access road was interrupted at its most vulnerable point by a wall and a deep moat crossed by a drawbridge. The castle entrance was through a tower gate built in one piece with the adjacent guardhouse. The front of the gate holds a significant place in Czech creative art. It is one of the few remaining specimens of 1460s stonemasonry and is linked with King George. The work and the setting of the reliefs show the sculptor's low artistic standard.

The relief over the small gate for pedestrians carries a helmet set with a jewel, the coats-of-arms-those of Bohemia, Moravia, Upper Lusatia and Poděbrady, and an inscription: "This tower was built during the reign of His Royal Highness King George of Bohemia and Margrave of Moravia in 1468." The text dates the gate's completion and most likely of the whole Poděbrady era of reconstruction. The figural reliefs on the left side represent King George with a ribbon across his chest, a human mask in the bottom part and a figure of a builder carrying a hammer in a niche above the king.

The gate was protected by a rectangular bastion, the broken line of corner fortifications, and another circular bastion beneath the inner castle. These served chiefly for the use of the artillery as it is testified by the remaining embrasures, typical of Poděbrady-type structures. The castle's southern wing with its slim, square tower, remains. The palace halls were illuminated by tall windows with window seats. They can be approached from the courtyard over the drawbridge that takes you to the first floor. The residential rooms on the second floor had windows facing the outside of the castle. The most notable feature at Litice is the tower. Its higher artistic value is evident from the portals giving access from the palace and the vaulting at the different floor levels.

The estate, heavily in debt, was purchased from the sons of George of Poděbrady by Vilém II of Pernštejn who linked it to nearby Potštejn where he transferred the administrative centre. The castle's importance started to decline and, because subsequent owners neglected its upkeep, it fell into ruin. From 1562, Litice was owned by the lords of Bubna of Litice. The 19th century witnessed the disintegration of some structures. Repair work from 1890 to 1894 and then in the 1920s and 1930s stabilized the southern palace and the tower, which then received its present gallery and roofing.

In 1815, the castle was purchased by the Parish family. Partial repairs occurred in 1933 and 1935. In 1948, the castle was confiscated from them by the state, who now oversee its maintenance.

== Gallery ==
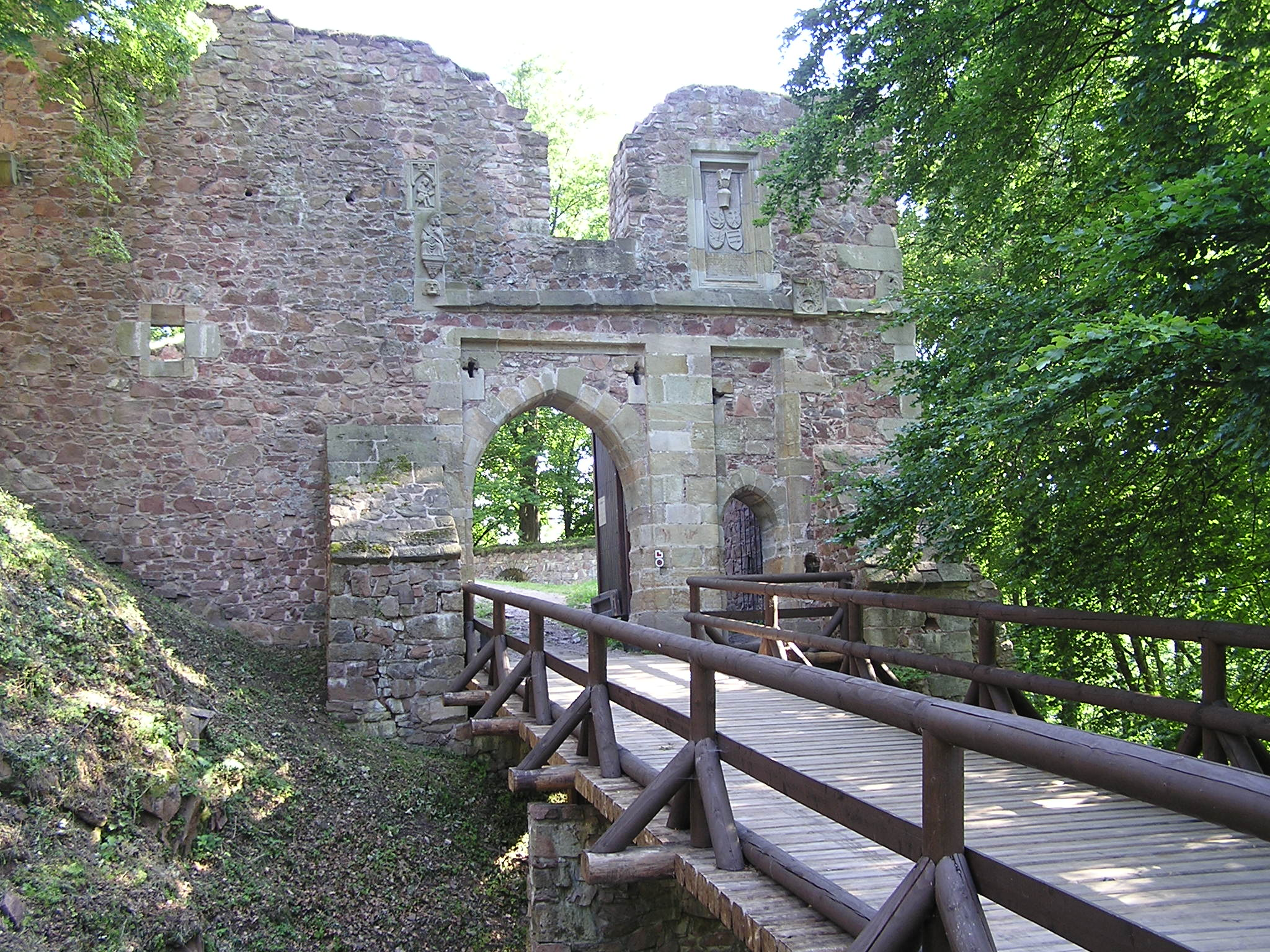
Entering gate

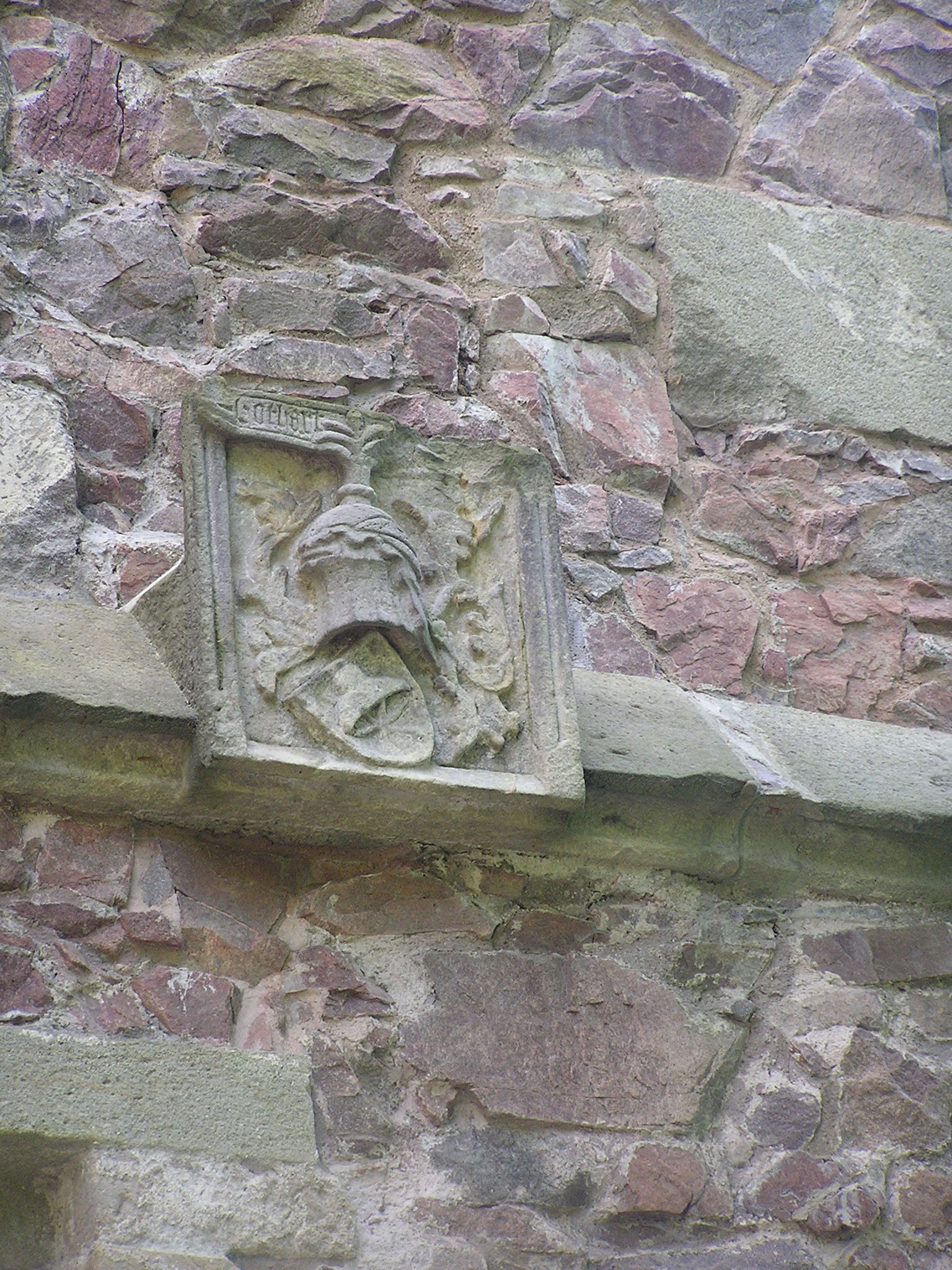

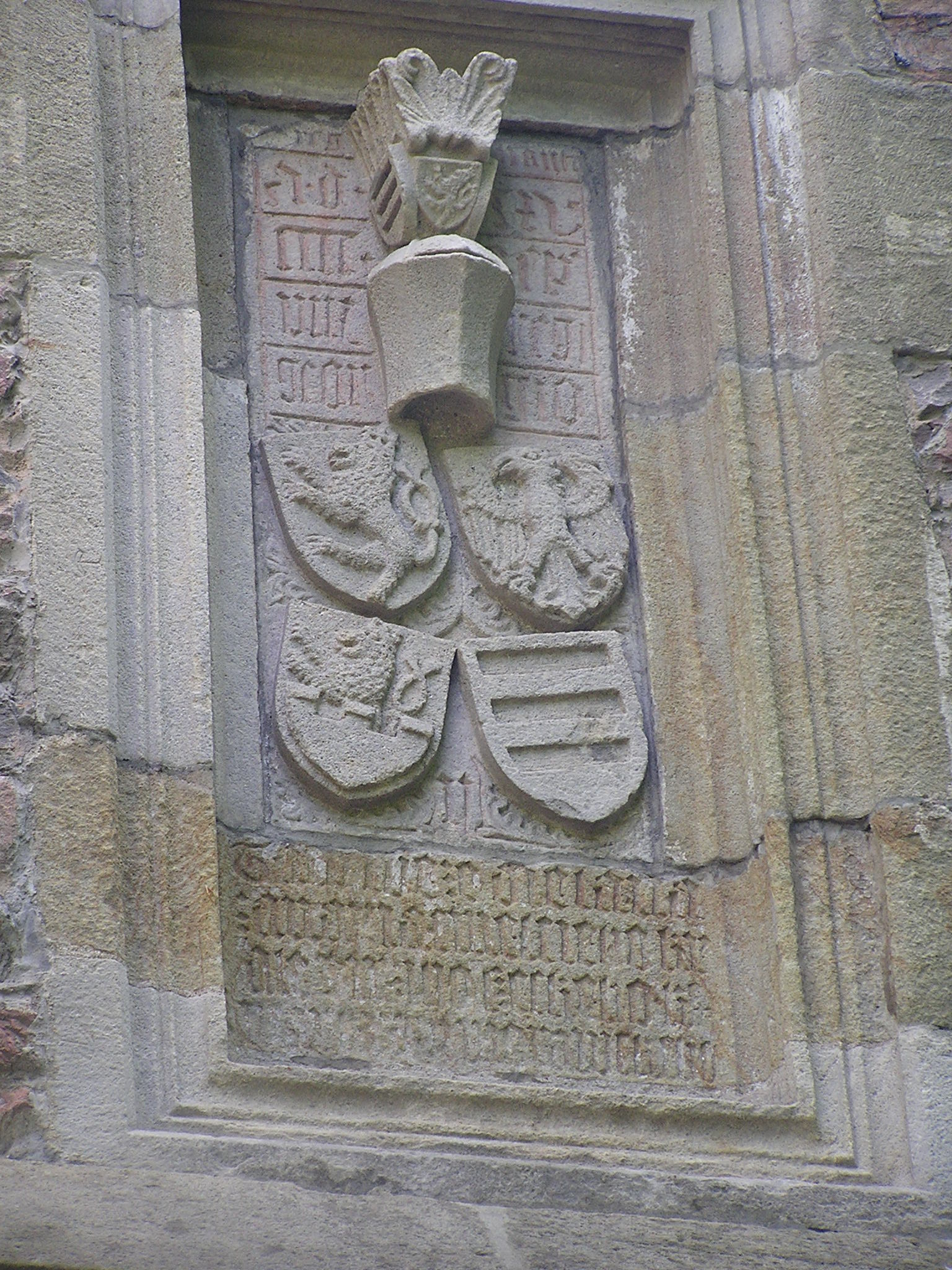

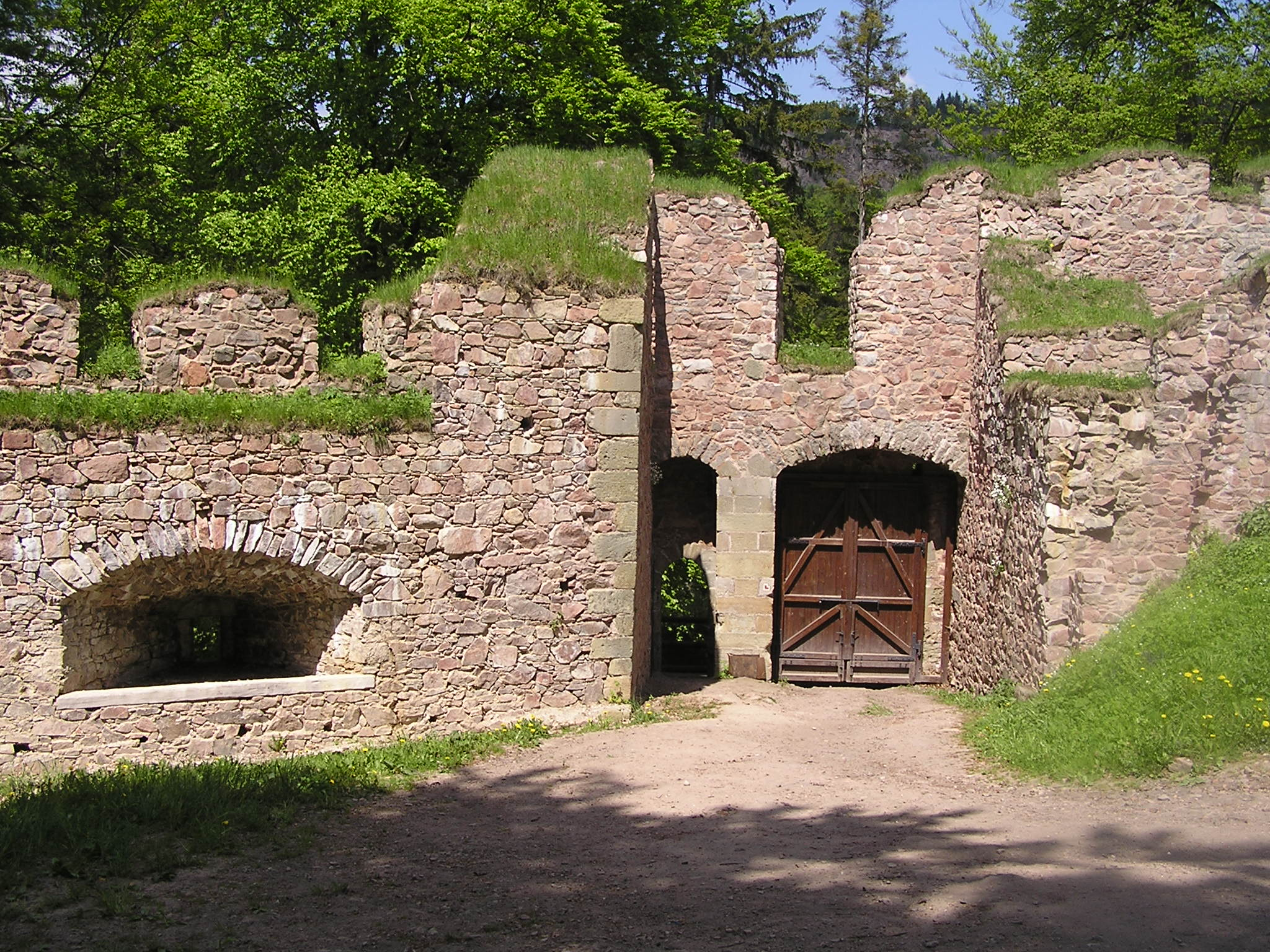

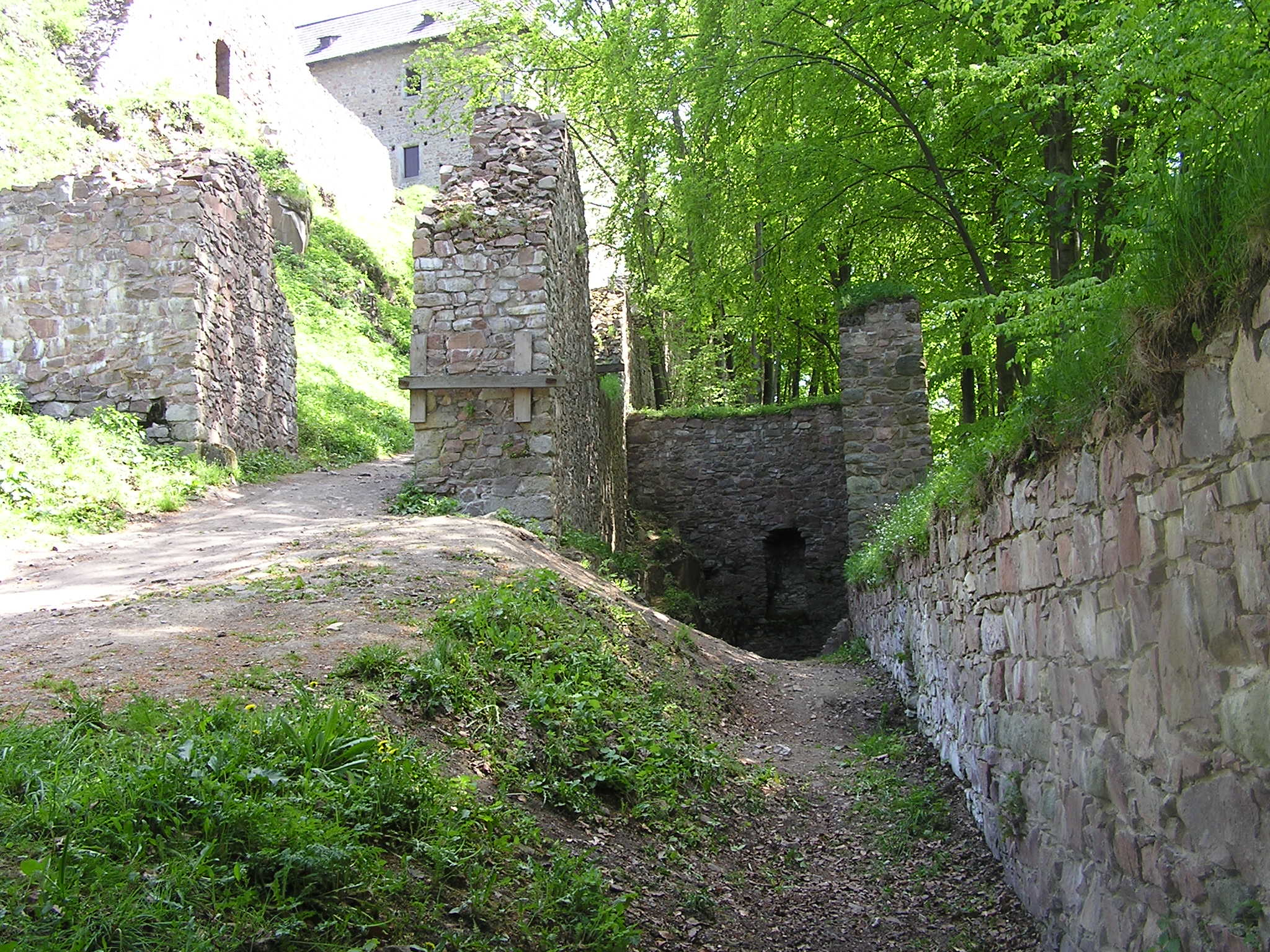

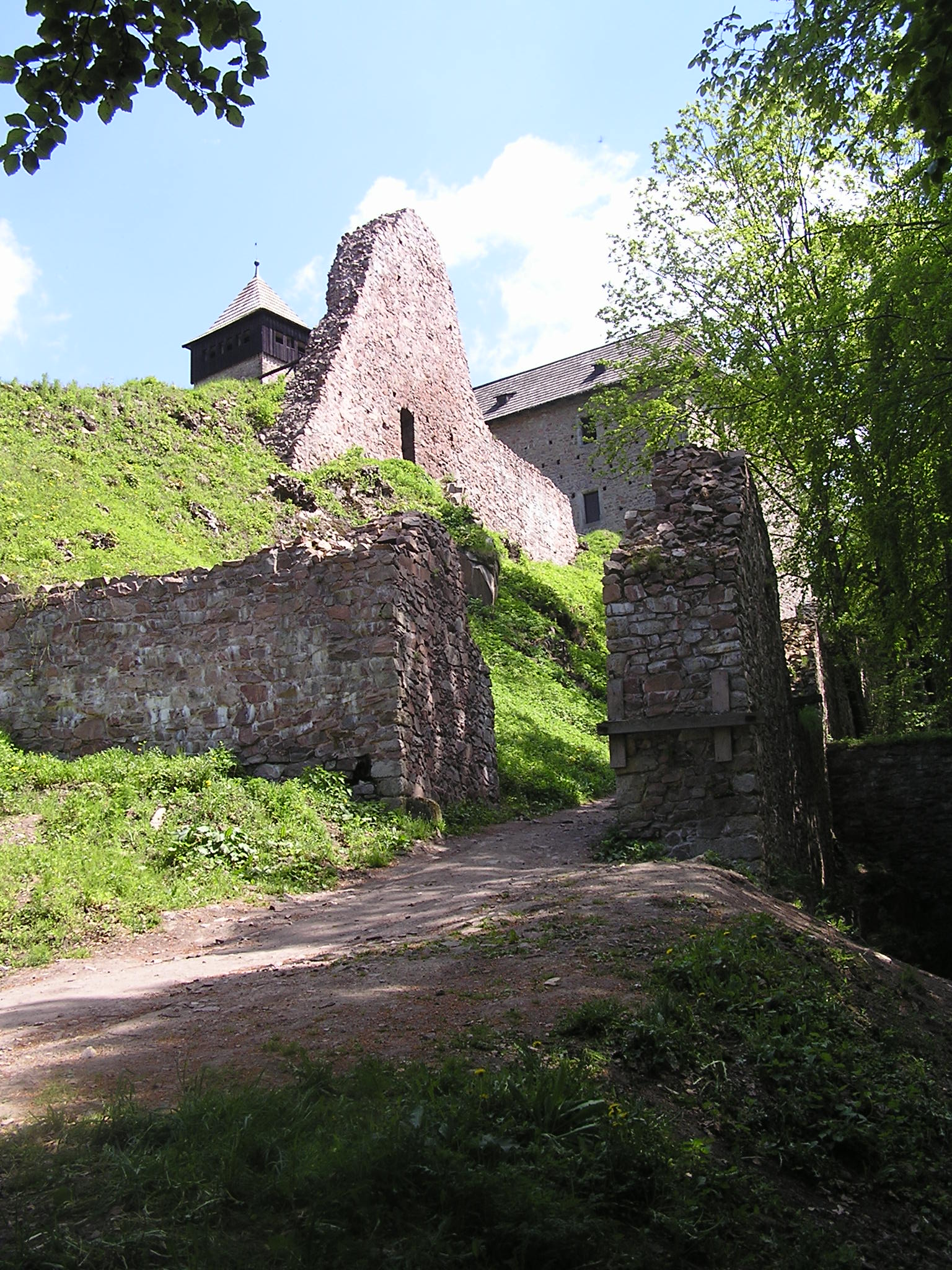

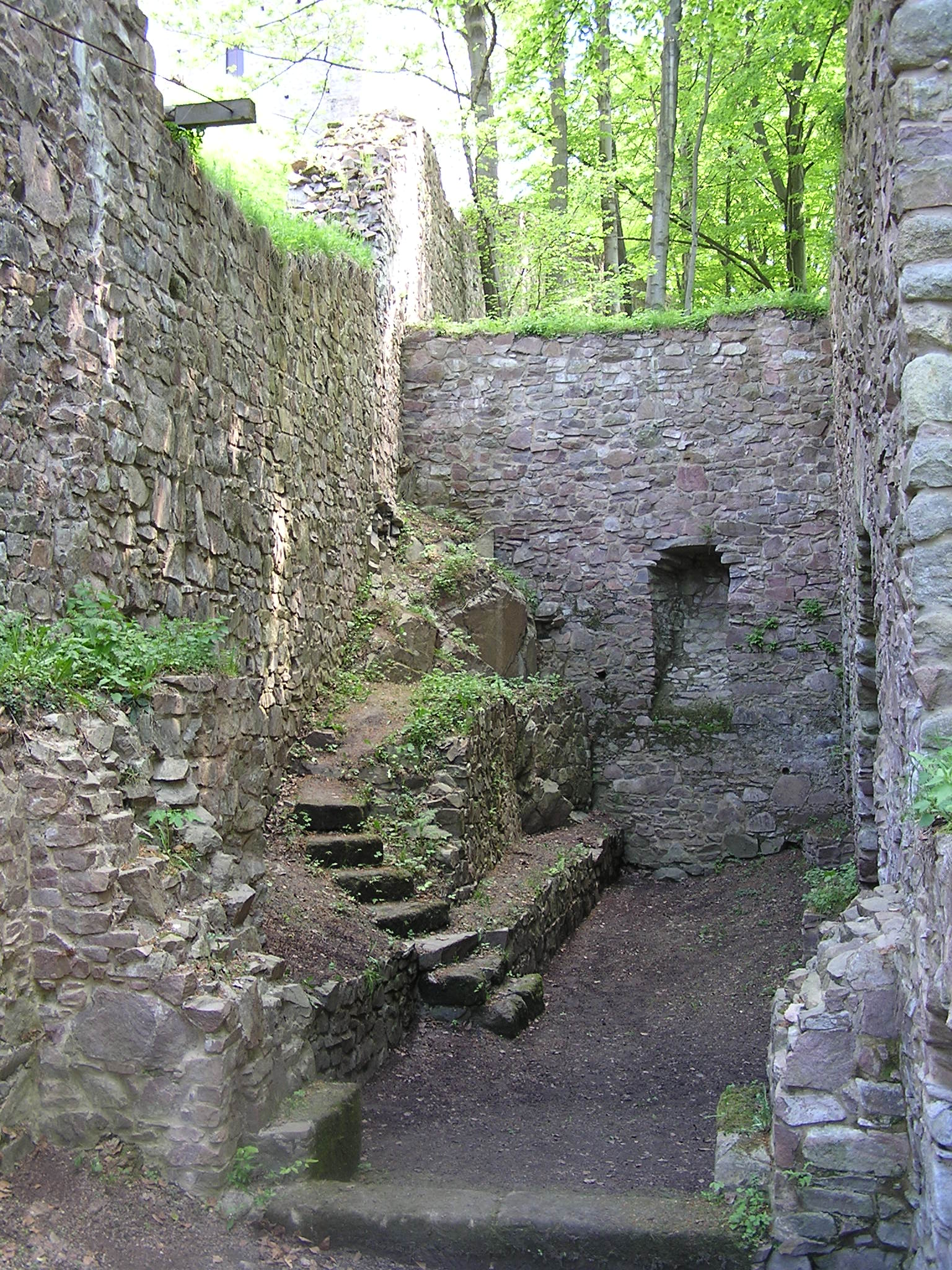

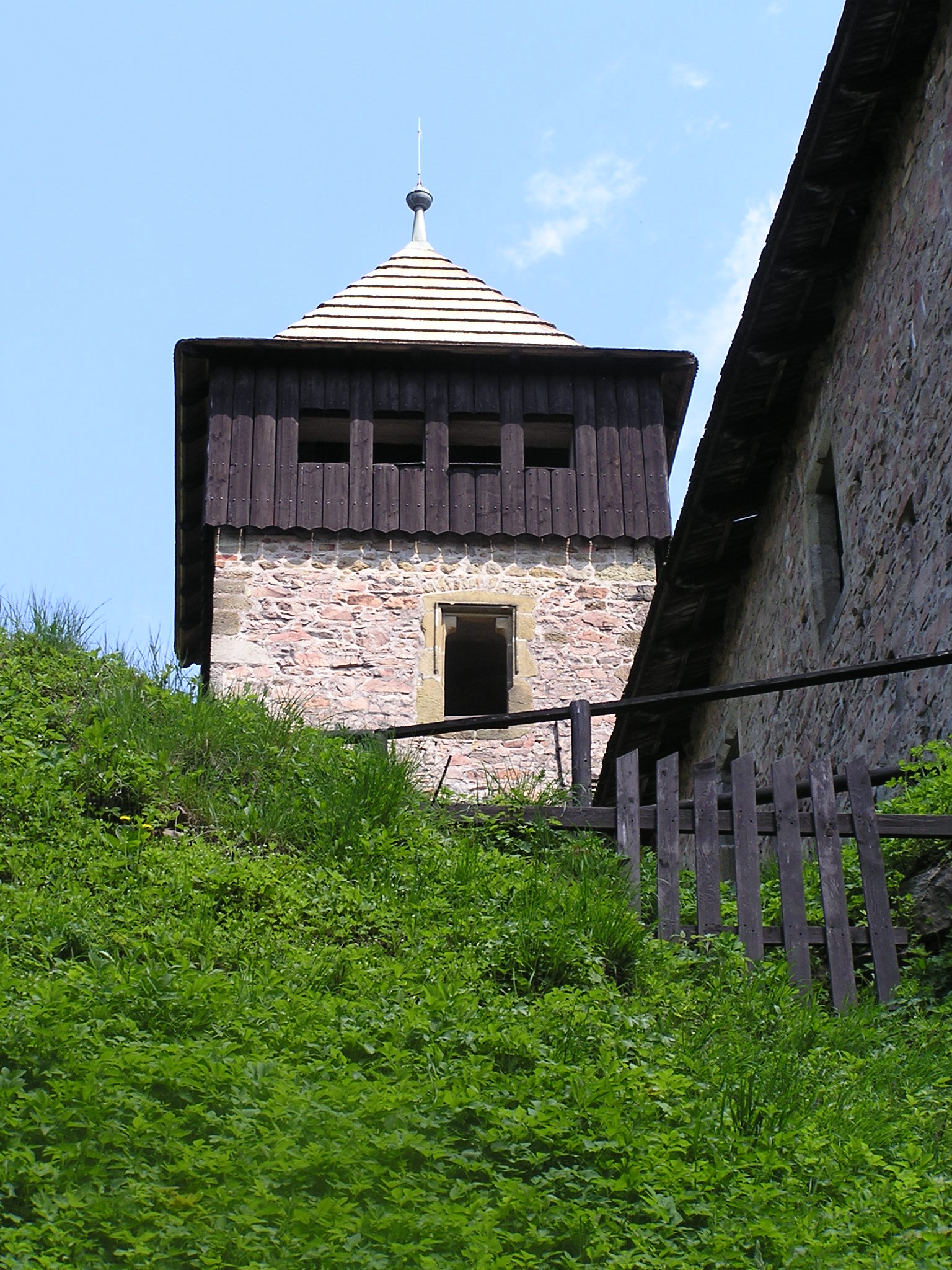

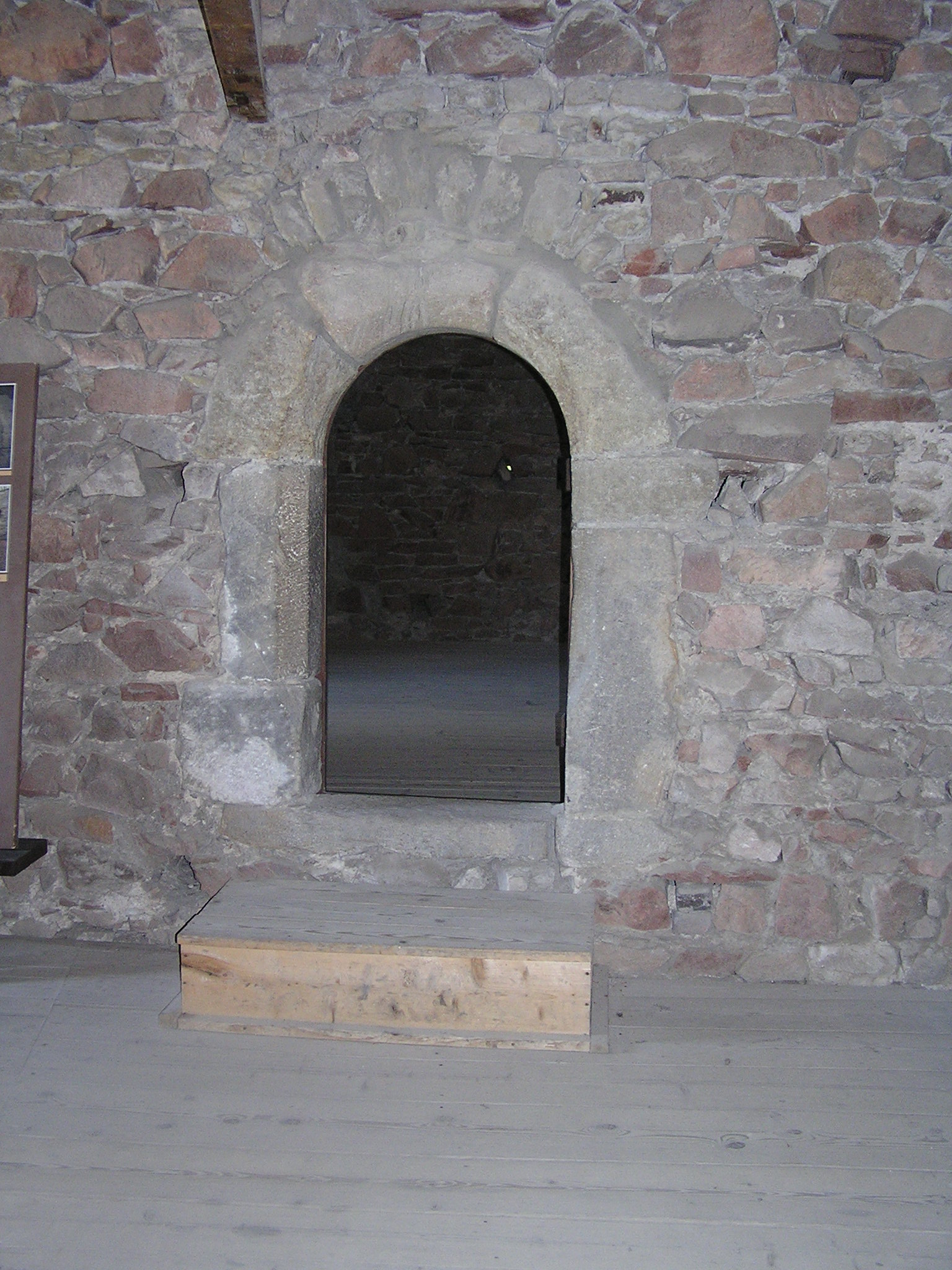

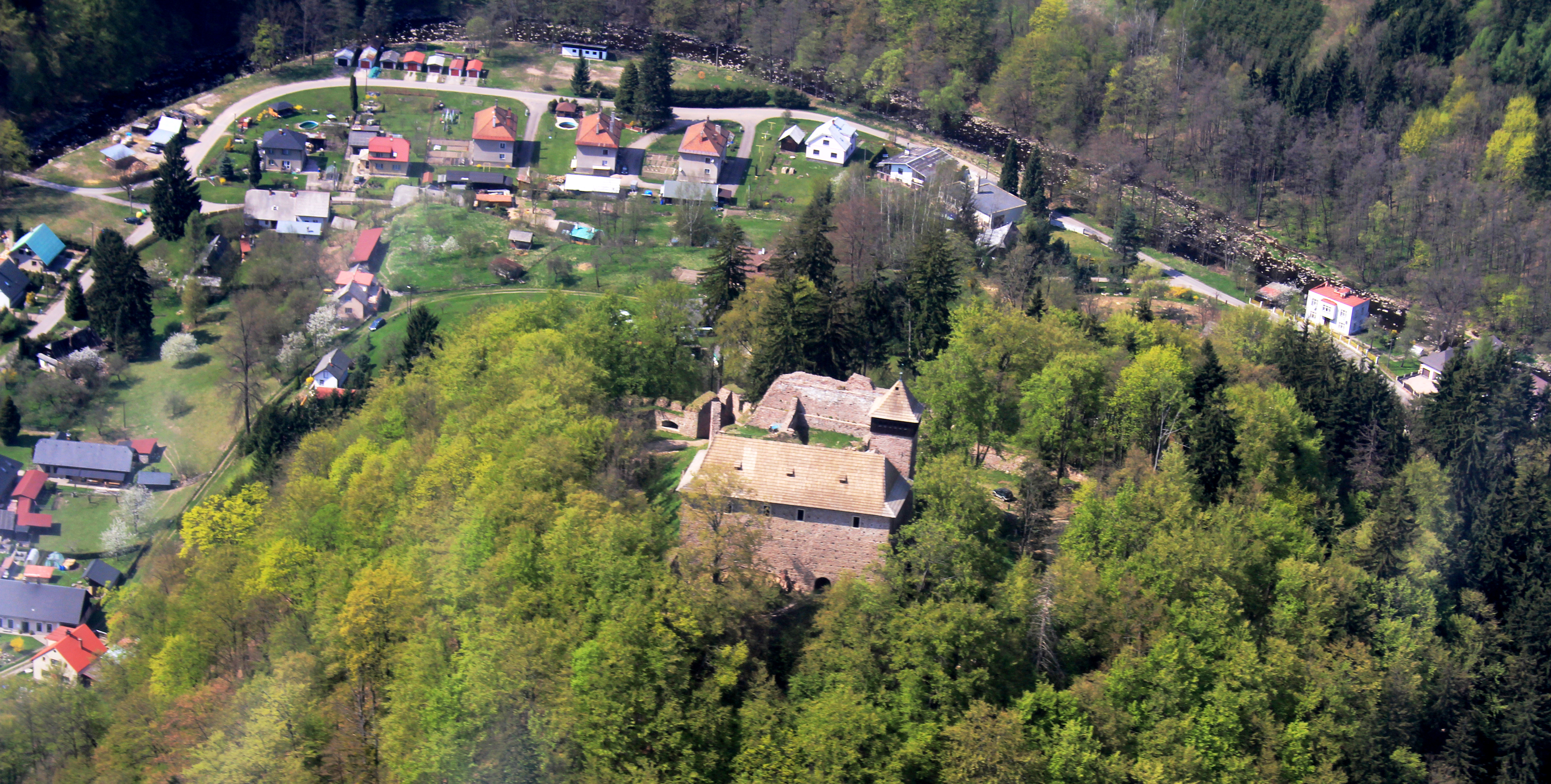
