= Záchlumí (Tachov District) =

- Municipality
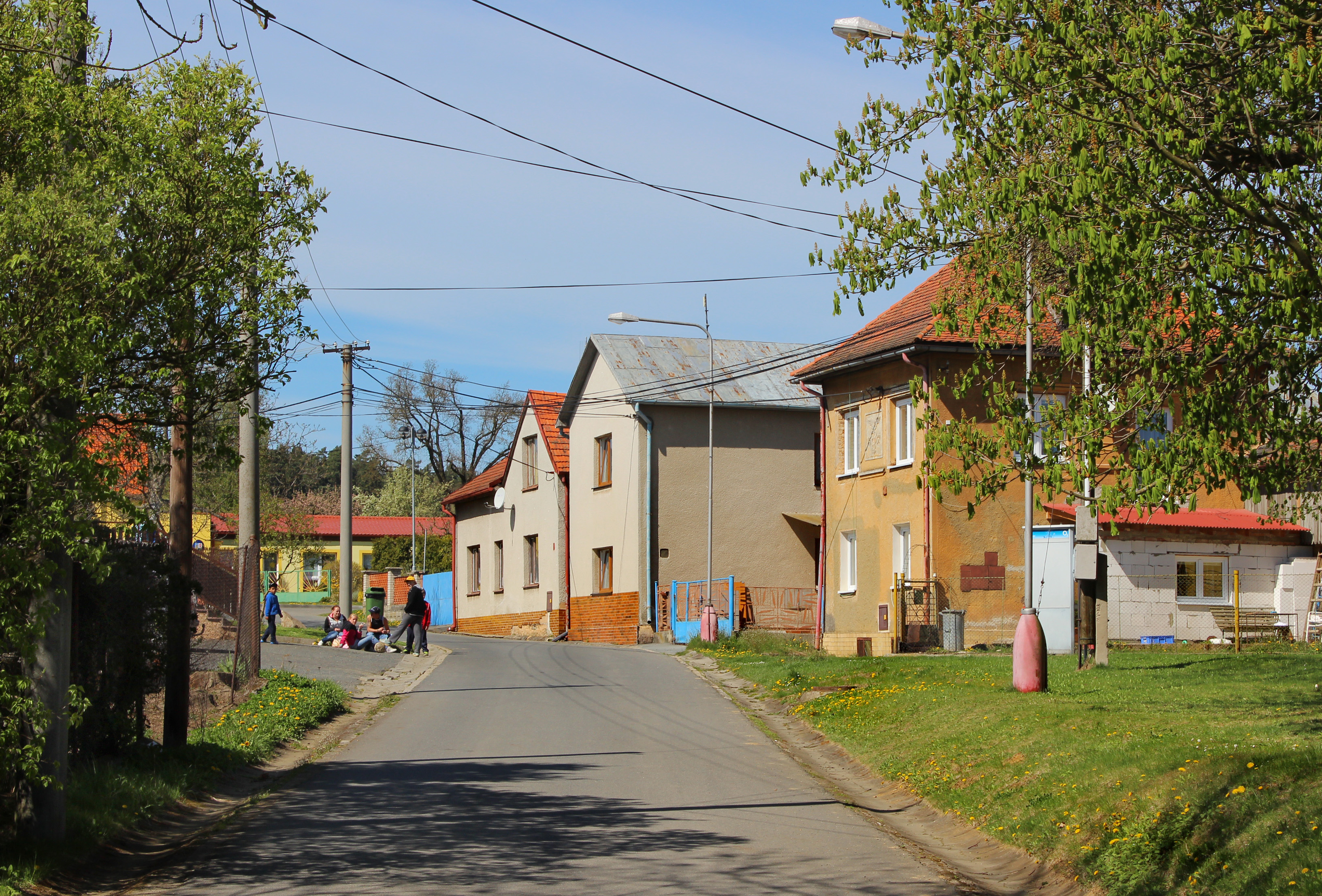
- Centre of Záchlumí

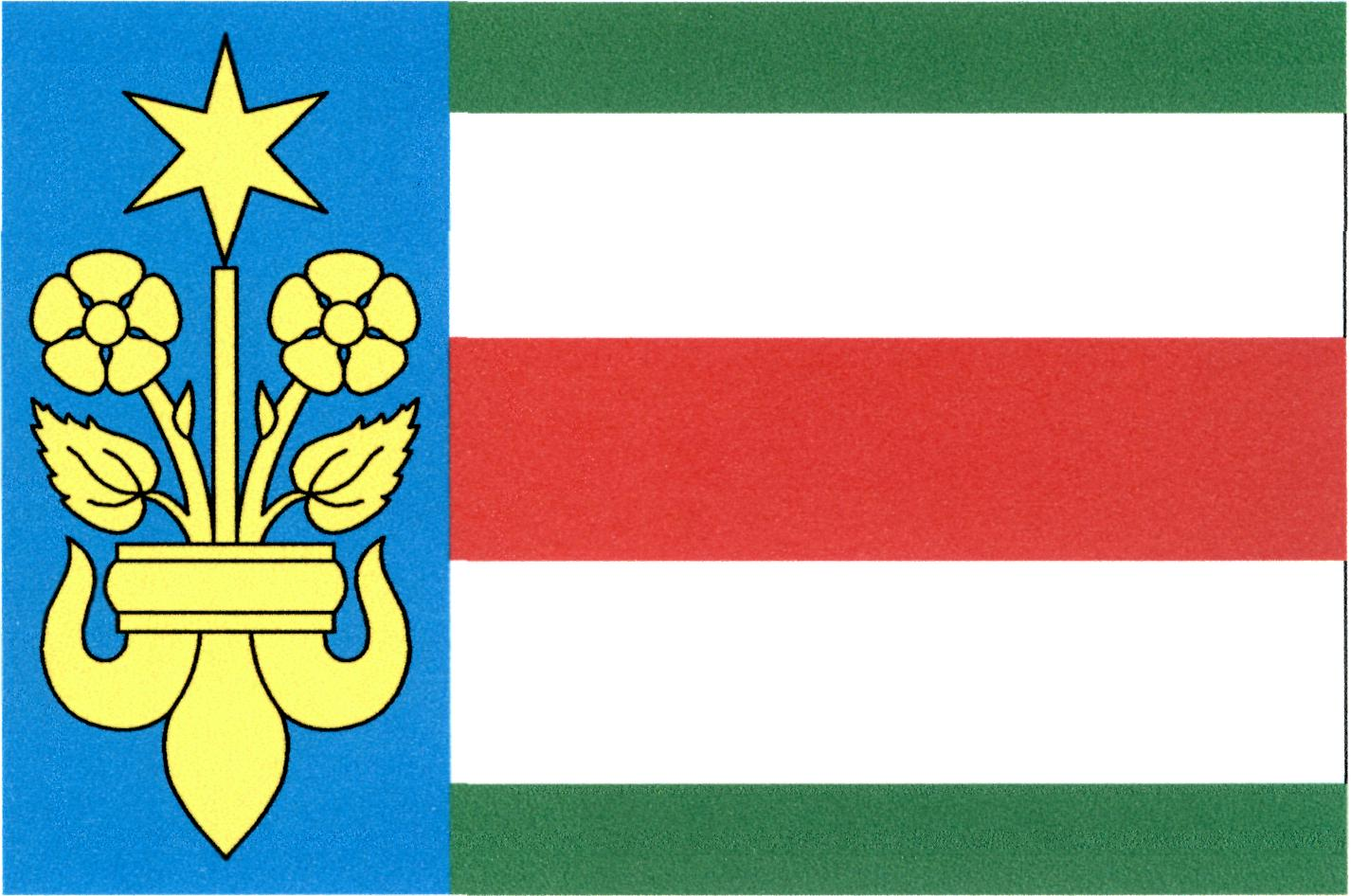
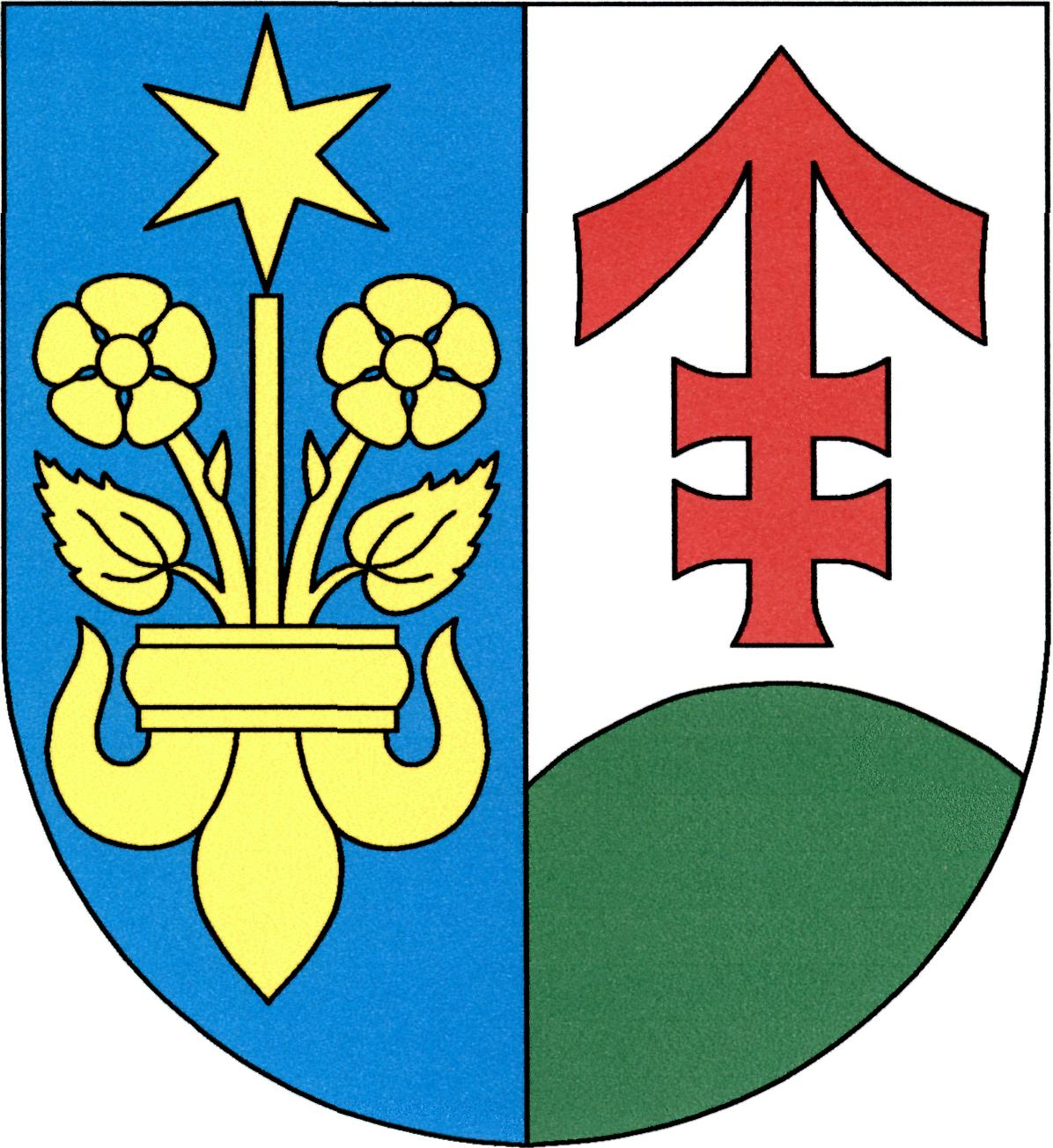
- Flag Coat of arms

- Location in the Czech Republic
- Coordinates: 49°48′0″N 12°57′54″E
- Country: Czech Republic
- Region: Plzeň
- District: Tachov
- First mentioned: 1359

Area
  - Total: 4.42 km^{2} (1.71 sq mi)
- Elevation: 497 m (1,631 ft)

Population (2026-01-01)
  - Total: 477
  - Density: 108/km^{2} (280/sq mi)
- Time zone: UTC+1 (CET)
  - Summer (DST): UTC+2 (CEST)
- Postal code: 349 01
- Website: www.zachlumi.cz

Záchlumí (German: Eisenhuttel) is a municipality and village in Tachov District in the Plzeň Region of the Czech Republic. It has about 500 inhabitants.

Záchlumí lies approximately 25 kilometres (16 mi) east of Tachov, 31 km (19 mi) west of Plzeň, and 110 km (68 mi) west of Prague.

== Demographics ==
Historical population
Year	Pop.	±%
1869	201	—
1880	177	−11.9%
1890	190	+7.3%
1900	205	+7.9%
1910	191	−6.8%
1921	190	−0.5%
1930	214	+12.6%
1950	111	−48.1%
1961	203	+82.9%
1970	207	+2.0%
1980	322	+55.6%
1991	403	+25.2%
2001	421	+4.5%
2011	360	−14.5%
2021	398	+10.6%
Source: Censuses
