= Záchlumí (Ústí nad Orlicí District) =

- Municipality
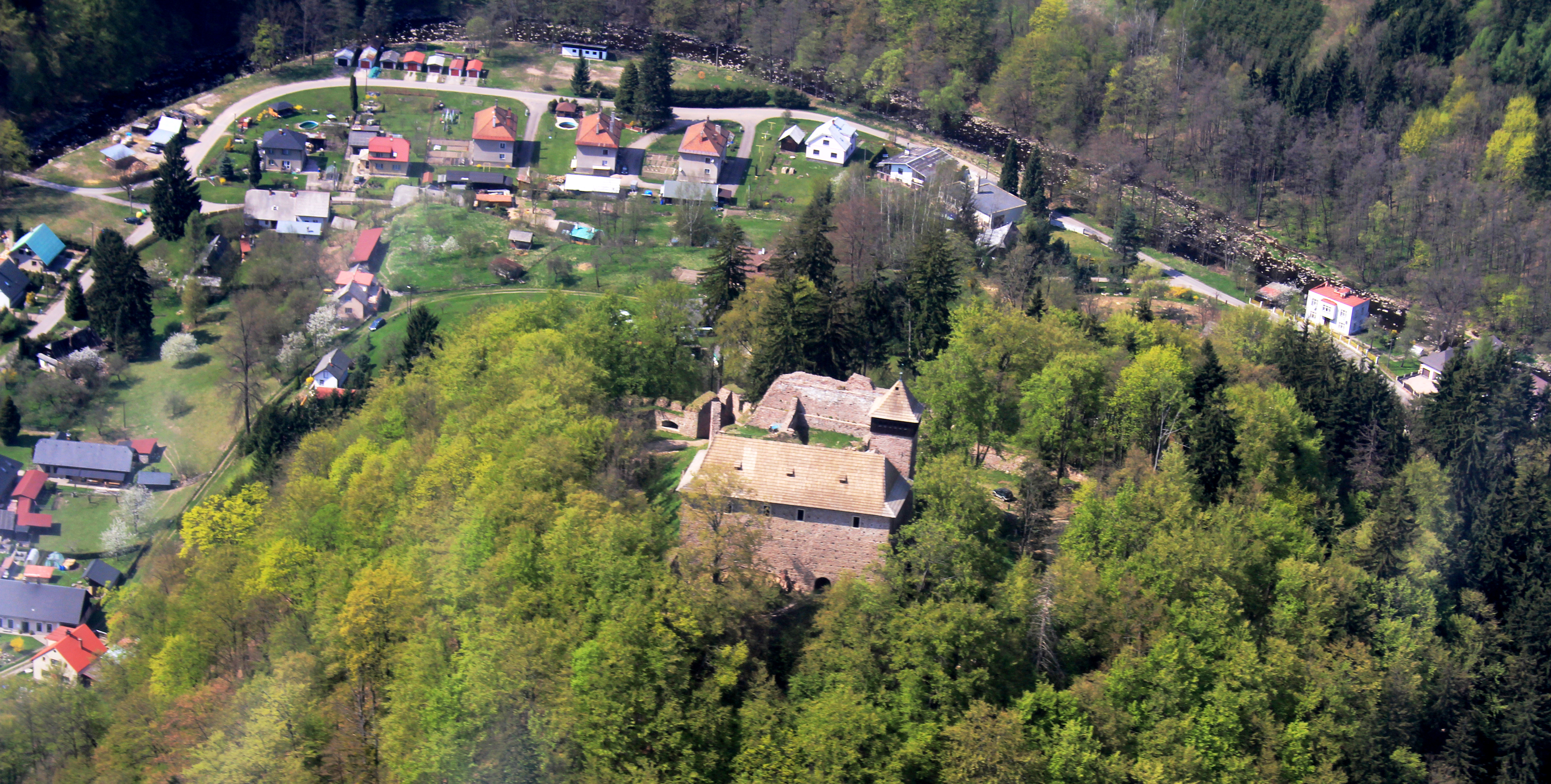
- Litice nad Orlicí, a part of Záchlumí

- Flag Coat of arms

- Location in the Czech Republic
- Coordinates: 50°5′43″N 16°22′35″E
- Country: Czech Republic
- Region: Pardubice
- District: Ústí nad Orlicí
- First mentioned: 1365

Area
  - Total: 13.52 km^{2} (5.22 sq mi)
- Elevation: 455 m (1,493 ft)

Population (2026-01-01)
  - Total: 774
  - Density: 57.2/km^{2} (148/sq mi)
- Time zone: UTC+1 (CET)
  - Summer (DST): UTC+2 (CEST)
- Postal code: 561 86
- Website: www.obeczachlumi.cz

Záchlumí is a municipality and village in Ústí nad Orlicí District in the Pardubice Region of the Czech Republic. It has about 800 inhabitants. The municipality is known for the Litice Castle.

== Administrative division ==
Záchlumí consists of three municipal parts (in brackets population according to the 2021 census):

- Záchlumí (423)
- Bohousová (152)
- Litice nad Orlicí (161)

== Etymology ==
The name Záchlumí translates as 'the area behind Chlum'. It refers to the location of the village near the hill Chlum.

== Geography ==
Záchlumí is located about 13 kilometres (8 mi) north of Ústí nad Orlicí and 43 km (27 mi) east of Pardubice. It lies in the Orlické Foothills. The highest point is the hill Chlum at 603 m (1,978 ft) above sea level. The Divoká Orlice River flows through the municipality.

== History ==
The history of the village is connected with Litice Castle, which was founded in the 13th century. The first written mention of Záchlumí is from 1365, when Jan of Lichtemburk sold the Litice estate to Jindřich of Lipá. From the abolishment of serfdom in the mid-19th century until 1975, Záchlumí, Bohousová and Litice nad Orlicí were three separate municipalities. On 1 January 1976, they were merged and have since formed the current municipality.

== Demographics ==
Historical population

Year	Pop.	±%
1869	952	—
1880	1,026	+7.8%
1890	1,100	+7.2%
1900	1,087	−1.2%
1910	1,113	+2.4%

Year	Pop.	±%
1921	1,008	−9.4%
1930	961	−4.7%
1950	795	−17.3%
1961	820	+3.1%
1970	728	−11.2%

Year	Pop.	±%
1980	715	−1.8%
1991	750	+4.9%
2001	736	−1.9%
2011	733	−0.4%
2021	736	+0.4%

Source: Censuses

== Transport ==
The I/11 road (the section from Hradec Králové to Šumperk) passes through the northern part of the municipality.

The municipality is located on the railway line Hradec Králové–Letohrad. There are two train stations: Bohousová and Litice nad Orlicí.

== Sights ==
The main landmark of the municipality is the Litice Castle. It was founded at the end of the 13th century and rebuilt in 1371. Reconstruction of the Gothic castle was finished in the early Renaissance style before 1468. In the 17th century, it was abandoned. In 1815, the castle was purchased by the Parish family, who had it repaired, but in 1948 the castle was confiscated from them by the state. Today the castle is still owned by the state and offers guided tours.

Among the protected cultural monuments are the three wooden belfries, one in each village. They were probably built as a fire prevention measure. The belfry in Záchlumí dates from 1790, the belfry in Litice nad Orlicí probably dates from the last third of the 18th century and the belfry in Bohousová dates from the second half of the 19th century.
