= Geréb =

Geréb is a surname. Notable people with the surname include:

- Ágnes Geréb (born 1952), Hungarian gynaecologist, midwife and psychologist
- John Geréb de Vingárt, Hungarian nobleman and Vice-Voivode of Transylvania
- Matthias Geréb, ban of Croatia from 1483 to 1489, son of John
