= Osvát Szilágyi =

15th-century Hungarian nobleman

- Noble family: House of Szilágyi
- Spouse: Ágota Pósa de Szer
- Issue: Ferenc Szilágyi; Margit Szilágyi, Jusztina (Ilona), Princess Consort of Wallachia
- Father: Ladislaus Szilágyi
- Mother: Katalin Bellyéni

Osvát Szilágyi (Hungarian: Szilágyi Osvát) (b.1436 - d. ?), was a Hungarian nobleman, member of the House of Szilágyi, son of Ladislaus Szilágyi and Katalin Bellyéni, brother of Michael Szilágyi, Regent of the Kingdom of Hungary, Erzsébet Szilágyi, Queen Mother of Hungary and uncle of King Matthias Corvinus of Hungary, Croatia and Bohemia, Duke of Austria.

He married in 1448 Ágota Pósa de Szer (also known as Ágota Szeri-Pósa) daughter of Count Miklós Pósa de Szer, they had three children:
– Ferenc Szilágyi
– Margit Szilágyi
– Jusztina (Ilona), Princess Consort of Wallachia, wife of Vlad III the Impaler.

== Ancestry ==
Ancestors of Osvát Szilágyi

8. Lóránd Szilágyi de Garázda
4. Miklós, Count de Szilágyi
2. László, Count de Szilágyi
1. Count Osvát Szilágyi
3. Countess Katalin Bellyéni

== Sources ==
- Fraknói Vilmos: Michael Szilágyi, The uncle of King Matthias (Bp., 1913)
- W.Vityi Zoltán: King Matthias maternal relatives
