= Ladislaus Hunyadi =

Hungarian nobleman (1431–1457)

- Count of Beszterce
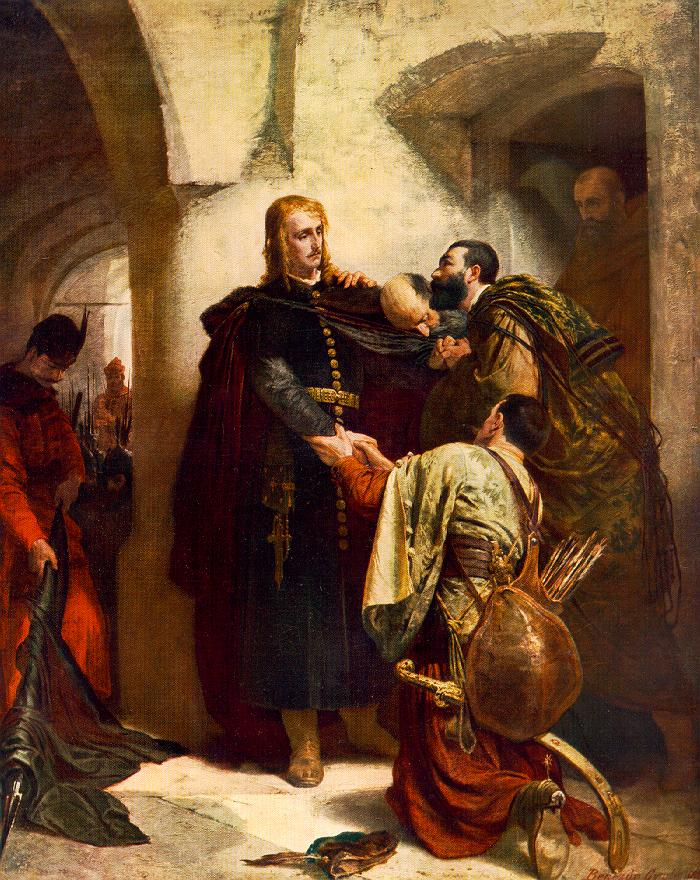
- Ladislaus Hunyadi's Farewell, by Gyula Benczúr (1866)

Ban of Croatia and Dalmatia
- Reign: 1453
- Predecessor: Peter Talovac
- Successor: Vacant
- Born: 1431
- Died: 16 March 1457 (aged 25–26); Buda, Hungary
- Noble family: House of Hunyadi
- Father: John Hunyadi
- Mother: Elizabeth Szilágyi

László Hunyadi or Ladislaus Hunyadi (Slovak: Ladislav Huňady; 1431 – 16 March 1457) was a Hungarian nobleman.

Ladislaus Hunyadi was the elder of the two sons of John Hunyadi, voivode of Transylvania and later regent of the Kingdom of Hungary, and Elizabeth Szilágyi. He was the older brother of Matthias Hunyadi, who would later become the king of Hungary. At a very early age he accompanied his father in his campaigns. After the Battle of Kosovo (1448) he was left for a time, as a hostage for his father, in the hands of George Brankovic (1427–1456), despot of Serbia. In 1452 he was a member of the deputation which went to Vienna to receive back the Hungarian king Ladislaus V. In 1453 he was already ban of Croatia and Dalmatia. At the diet of Buda (1455) he resigned all his dignities, because of the accusations of Ulrich II, Count of Celje, and other enemies of his house, but a reconciliation was ultimately patched together and he was betrothed to Anna, the daughter of the palatine, Ladislaus Garai.

After his father's death in 1456, he was declared by his enemy Ulrich II (now Captain General of Hungary with significant power) responsible for the debts allegedly owed by the elder Hunyadi to the state; but he defended himself so ably at the diet of Futak (October 1456) that Ulrich feigned a reconciliation, promising to protect the Hunyadis on condition that they first surrendered all the royal castles entrusted to them. A beginning was to be made with the fortress of Nándorfehérvár (now Belgrade, Serbia) of which Hunyadi was commandant. While admitting Ladislaus V and Ulrich, Hunyadi excluded their army of mercenaries. On the following morning (9 November 1456), Ulrich was killed by Hunyadi's men in unclear circumstances. Later Hunyadi served as master of the horse (Hungarian: lovászmester) until his death.

The terrified young king thereupon pardoned Hunyadi, and at a subsequent interview with his mother at Temesvár swore that he would protect the whole family. As a pledge of his sincerity he appointed Hunyadi lord treasurer and captain-general of the kingdom. Suspecting no evil, Hunyadi accompanied the king to Buda. But on arriving there he was arrested on a charge of plotting against the king, condemned to death without the observance of any legal formalities, and beheaded on 16 March 1457.

Hunyadi was the protagonist of a popular Hungarian opera, Hunyadi László by Ferenc Erkel.

== Ancestry ==
Ancestors of Ladislaus Hunyadi

16. Costea (?)
8. Serbe
4. Voyk Hunyadi
2. John Hunyadi
5. Elizabeth Morzsinai (?)
1. Ladislaus Hunyadi
24. Roland Szilágyi
12. Nicholas Szilágyi
6. Ladislaus Szilágyi
3. Elizabeth Szilágyi
7. Catherina Bellyéni

== Sources ==
- Acsády, Ignác (1904). History of the Hungarian Realm (in Hungarian), vol. i., Budapest.
- Engel, Pál (1996). Magyarország világi archontológiája, 1301–1457, I. ("Secular Archontology of Hungary, 1301–1457, Volume I"). História, MTA Történettudományi Intézete. Budapest. ISBN 963-8312-44-0.
- Kubinyi, András (2007). "Hunyadi Mátyás, a személyiség és a király". AETAS. 22: 83–100.
- Bánhegyi, Ferenc: A Hunyadiak dicsősége, Celldömölk, Apáczai Kiadó, 2008.
- Mureşanu, Camil (2001). John Hunyadi: Defender of Christendom. The Center for Romanian Studies. ISBN 973-9432-18-2.

Ladislaus Hunyadi House of Hunyadi Born: 1431 Died: 16 March 1457
Political offices
Preceded by John Hunyadi	Ispán of Pozsony; 1452	Succeeded by Ladislaus Lévai
Preceded by Peter Talovac	Ban of Croatia and Dalmatia; 1453	Vacant Title next held by Pavao Špirančić
Preceded by Ladislaus Nagyvölgyi	Master of the horse 1456–1457	Succeeded by Nicholas Pető
Preceded by John Hunyadi	Ispán of Temes; 1456–1457	Succeeded by vacant
Preceded by John Hunyadi	Ispán of Trencsén; 1456–1457	Succeeded by ?
