= Justina Szilágyi =

Justina Szilágyi of Horogszeg
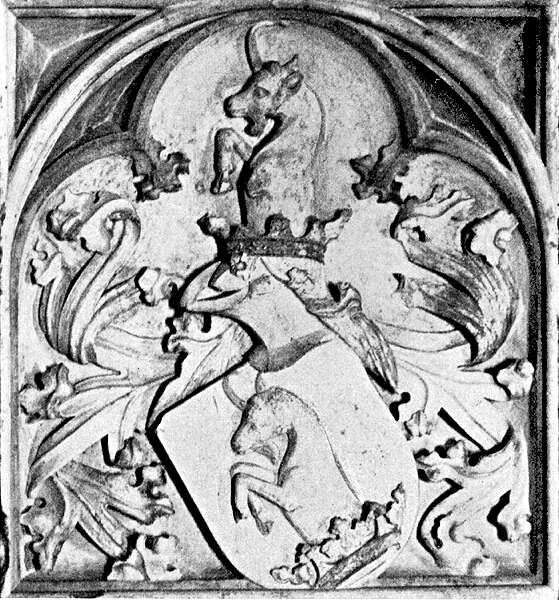
- Szilágyi coat of arms

Princess consort of Wallachia
- Tenure: 1476
- Died: 1497
- Spouse: Wenceslas Pongrác; Vlad III of Wallachia; Paul Suki; John Erdélyi
- Family: Szilágyi of Horogszeg
- Father: Ladislaus or Osvát Szilágyi
- Mother: Agatha Pósa of Szer (?)
- Religion: Roman Catholic

Justina Szilágyi of Horogszeg (Hungarian: horogszegi Szilágyi Jusztina; (Note: Hungarian pronunciation: [ˈhoroɡsɛɡi ˈsilaːɟi ˈjustinɒ]) died 1497) was a Hungarian noblewoman and the second wife of Vlad the Impaler, Voivode of Wallachia. She married four times: her first two marriages were arranged in accordance with the political interests of her cousin Matthias Corvinus, King of Hungary, while her later marriages helped to protect her claims to estates in Transylvania.

Corvinus arranged her first marriage to Wenceslas Pongrác of Szentmiklós, who had inherited estates in Upper Hungary, in present-day Slovakia. Pongrác was later compelled to exchange these for properties in Transylvania, which he and Justina held jointly. After his death in 1474, Corvinus arranged her marriage to Vlad. Although Vlad had previously been kept under house arrest by the king, Corvinus recognised him as the lawful voivode of Wallachia in 1475. Vlad regained the Wallachian throne in late 1476, but was killed soon afterwards while fighting his rival, Basarab Laiotă.

After Vlad's death, Justina married Paul Suki, a relative of a former co-owner from whom part of the Transylvanian property had been confiscated. Following Suki's death in 1479, she married John Erdélyi of Somkerék, whose family also laid claim to the estates. Justina died childless sometime after 13 June 1497, and her fourth husband survived her.

== Family background ==
Justina was born into the Szilágyi family, a Hungarian noble house that rose to prominence under her grandfather, Ladislaus Szilágyi. Between 1403 and 1408, King Sigismund of Hungary granted him estates in several counties (Note: In 1403, Ladislaus received the villages of Coborszentmihály, Halmos and Jánosi in Bács County, in southern Hungary. In 1407, the Transylvanian villages of Horogszeg in Doboka County and Szentimre in Fehér County were granted jointly to Ladislaus and his comrade Nicholas Garázda in exchange for villages elsewhere in the Kingdom of Hungary.) in recognition of his military service. Ladislaus's eldest daughter, Elizabeth Szilágyi, Justina's aunt, married John Hunyadi c. 1428–30. As the historian András Kubinyi notes, Hunyadi "had one of the greatest careers in Hungarian history": he entered the service of wealthy aristocrats before attaining some of the kingdom's highest offices, including that of Voivode (royal governor) of Transylvania. Between 1446 and 1452, he governed Hungary as regent for the underage King Ladislaus V. He died in 1456, shortly after his victory over the forces of the Ottoman sultan Mehmed II at the Siege of Belgrade.

King Ladislaus soon came into conflict with Hunyadi's sons. He ordered the execution of the elder, Ladislaus Hunyadi, and imprisoned the younger, Matthias, later known as Matthias Corvinus. Following Ladislaus V's death from illness in 1457, Matthias was elected king of Hungary, although he took several years to consolidate his rule. According to Kubinyi, Justina's life "shows how Matthias tended to offer support to his relatives when it served his interests to do so". The historian Alexandru Simon characterises Justina as "a true 'service bride' (mainly for 'second rank' problems)" for Corvinus.

== Early life ==
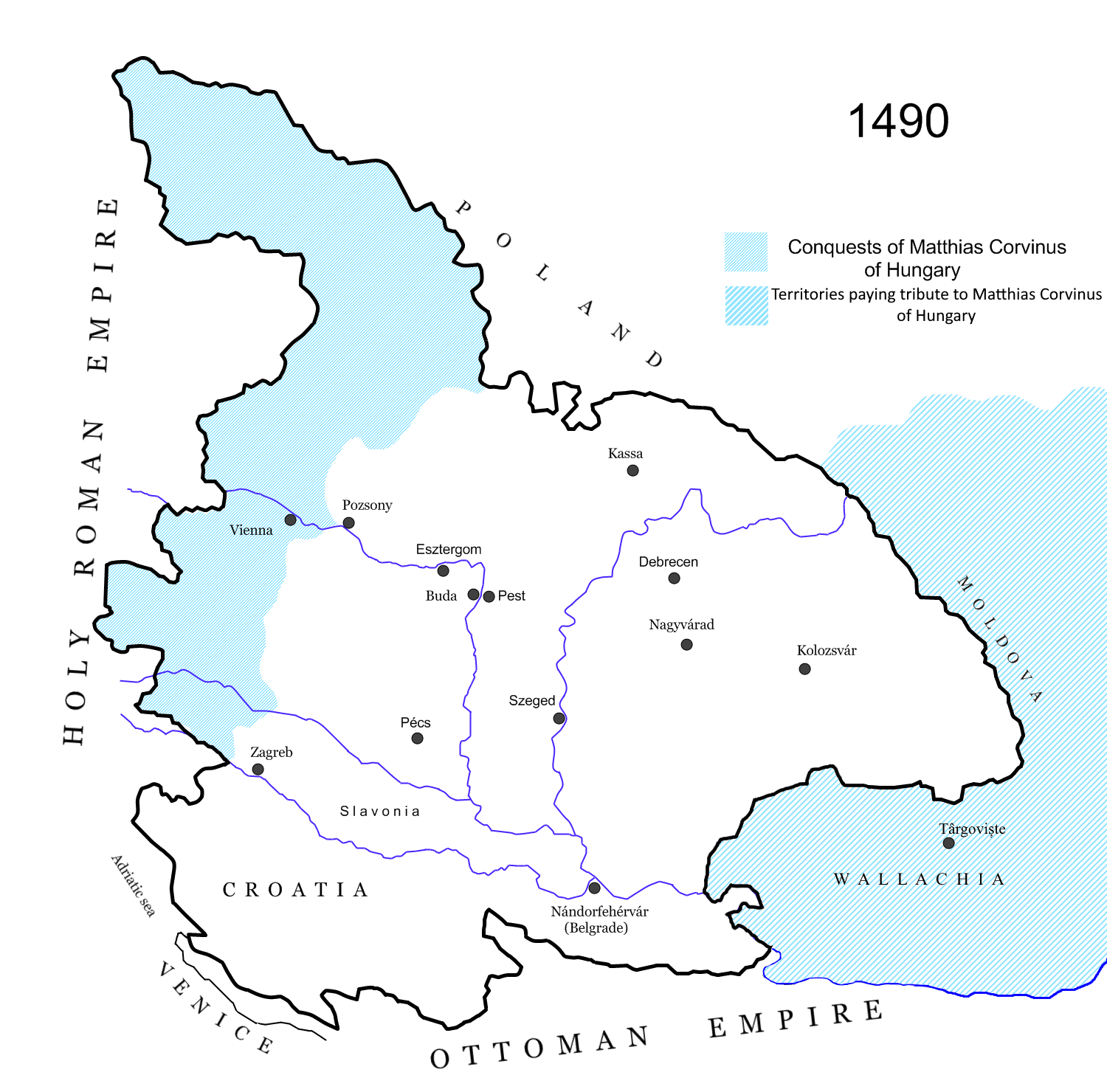
Map of the Kingdom of Hungary, its vassal states, and the neighbouring territories conquered by Matthias Corvinus, 1490

Many details of Justina's early life remain uncertain. In 1479, a royal charter identified her as the daughter of Osvát Szilágyi, the maternal uncle of Matthias Corvinus, whereas seventeen years later another document named Osvát's younger brother, Ladislaus, as her father. Yet another document suggests that Osvát's son, Francis, was Justina's father. On the basis of the 1479 document, Kubinyi, Simon and the medievalists Tamás Fedeles and Tamás Csifó identify Osvát and his wife, Agatha Pósa of Szer, as Justina's parents. Agatha belonged to a prominent noble family.

By contrast, the historians Pál Engel and Mihai-Florin Hasan, following the 1496 document, identify Justina as the daughter of Ladislaus Szilágyi and his wife, whose identity is unknown. Hasan argues that Justina was less than a year old when Ladislaus died in 1454, and suggests that she was subsequently adopted by Osvát, which may explain why he was later identified as her father. Csifó notes that a contemporary document describing Osvát's wife as a widow indicates that Osvát died more than a year before Ladislaus's death.

== Marriages ==
=== First marriage ===
Justina's first husband, Wenceslas (also known as Ladislaus) Pongrác of Szentmiklós, was a member of a prominent noble family that held estates in Upper Hungary (now Slovakia). (Note: Wenceslas's father, Pancratius of Szentmiklós, ispán (head) of Liptó County, remained aligned with the Hunyadis' opponents in 1456. The following year, however, he and his sons and brothers concluded an agreement with Elizabeth Szilágyi, the widow of John Hunyadi, and her brother, Michael Szilágyi, who pledged, "with true fraternal affection and friendship", to protect Pancratius and his kinsmen "against all men for the rest of their lives".) The marriage, contracted shortly before 1474, strengthened the position of her cousin, Matthias Corvinus, in the northern regions of his kingdom. Wenceslas held the fortress of Strečno and the town of Žilina, but Corvinus compelled him to exchange them for estates in Transylvania, including Gornești, which had been confiscated from the Erdélyi of Somkerék and Suki families following their participation in a rebellion against Corvinus in 1467. Unlike the estates in Upper Hungary, which Wenceslas had held in his own right, the newly acquired Transylvanian estates were held jointly by him and Justina. The marriage was short-lived, as Wenceslas died in 1474. Nevertheless, royal charters from the following year until Justina's death almost invariably referred to her as Wenceslas's widow. The newly acquired Transylvanian estates became a source of continuing legal disputes, as the Erdélyi and Suki families repeatedly sought to recover them from Justina.

=== Second marriage ===
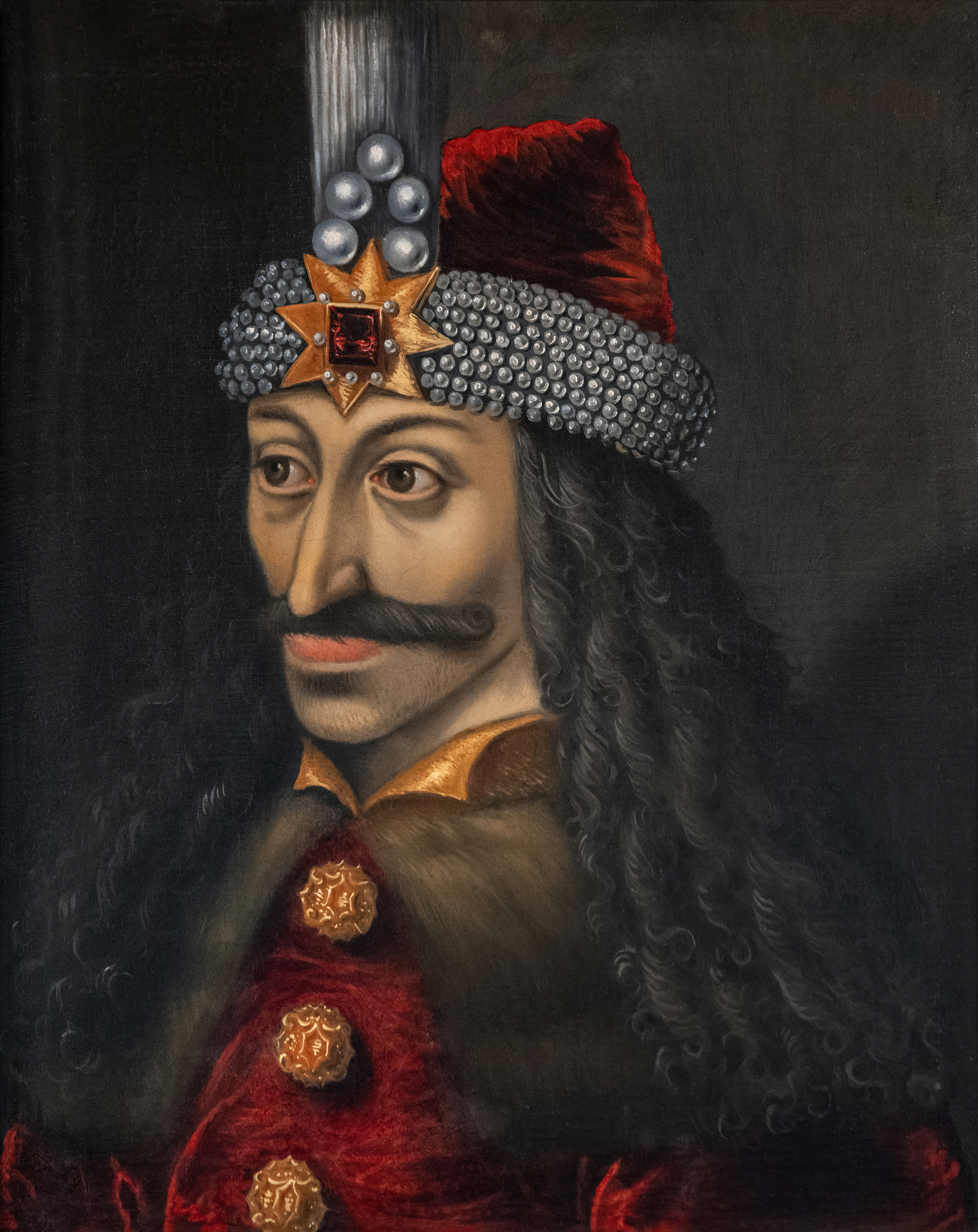
Justina's second husband, Vlad the Impaler (or Dracula), Prince of Wallachia

Justina married Vlad the Impaler, also known as Dracula, in 1475 or 1476. Vlad had ruled Wallachia briefly in 1448 and again from 1456 to 1462. In 1462, his half-brother, Radu the Handsome, forced him, with Ottoman support, to seek refuge in Transylvania. Despite having recently married Corvinus's unnamed kinswoman, Vlad was arrested there on Corvinus's orders in November. (Note: On the basis of a remark in a nearly contemporary source, The Tale of Voivode Dracula (1483–1486), Hasan identifies Vlad's first wife as an illegitimate daughter of John Hunyadi and, consequently, as Corvinus's half-sister. A family tree compiled c. 1553 by Nicolaus Olahus, Archbishop of Esztergom, who claimed kinship with both the ruling Basarab dynasty of Wallachia and the Hunyadi family, identifies Vlad's wife as Helena, a granddaughter of Hunyadi's purported sister Marina, Oláh's grandmother.) (Note: During his second reign, Vlad first came into conflict with Mehmed II after refusing to pay tribute, and later with Corvinus over restrictions imposed on the commercial activities of Transylvanian Saxon merchants in Wallachia. Corvinus supported a rival claimant, Dan III, in an unsuccessful attack on Wallachia. The growing Ottoman threat, however, led to a rapprochement between Vlad and the Hungarian king. Their reconciliation was reinforced by Vlad's marriage to Corvinus's half-sister. When Radu the Handsome attacked Wallachia, Corvinus did not intervene, as influential Transylvanian leaders had also sided with Radu.) To justify the arrest, Corvinus produced letters purportedly written by Vlad in which he allegedly offered to support an Ottoman invasion of Transylvania. The historians Matei Cazacu and Radu Florescu regard the letters as probable forgeries.

Vlad was initially imprisoned at Visegrád, but was later transferred to Pest, where he lived under house arrest with his wife and sons. Compiled between 1483 and 1486, The Tale of Voivode Dracula states that Vlad and his wife had lived together for ten years, suggesting that Vlad's first wife died in 1472 or 1473. Meanwhile, Radu the Handsome sought to balance Ottoman and Hungarian interests, paying tribute to the Sultan while acknowledging Corvinus's suzerainty. His rule was challenged by a new claimant, Basarab Laiotă, who invaded Wallachia with the support of Stephen III of Moldavia. By the time Radu died of illness in January 1475, Basarab had seized much of the principality. He soon sought a reconciliation with the Ottomans.

Corvinus released Vlad at the request of Stephen III, who had concluded an alliance with the Hungarian king and sworn fealty to him. Vlad's release took place before 18 July 1475, when Florius Reverella, the envoy of the Duke of Ferrara, recorded that Corvinus had recognized Vlad as the lawful ruler of Wallachia. According to The Tale, Corvinus made his recognition of Vlad, who was Orthodox, conditional upon Vlad's conversion to Catholicism. Corvinus also arranged Vlad's marriage to his cousin Justina to strengthen the dynastic alliance between Hungary and Wallachia.

After Basarab made peace with Hungary, Corvinus ultimately withdrew his support for Vlad's attempt to regain the Wallachian throne. Vlad nevertheless took part in Corvinus's campaign against the Ottomans in Bosnia. He also acquired a house in Pécs in southern Hungary, which soon became known as Drakwlyaháza ("Dracula's house"). (Note: The property was mentioned in a deed issued by the Pécs Chapter on 10 September 1489, which also referred to "Justina, the widow of the late voivode Dragwlya".)

Vlad settled in Transylvania in early 1476. That summer, Basarab supported Mehmed's campaign against Moldavia. In response, Stephen Báthory, Corvinus's voivode of Transylvania, backed Vlad's invasion of Wallachia in October or November. Basarab was forced to flee to the Ottoman Empire. Vlad was installed as voivode in early November. He sent envoys to Brașov requesting carpenters to help him build a new residence in Târgoviște. Hasan suggests that "this request stemmed from Vlad's desire to provide his wife with a comfortable home located closer to Hungary or Transylvania", although it is unclear whether Justina ever joined her husband in Wallachia. Vlad's third reign was short-lived. Around Christmas 1476, Basarab returned to Wallachia with Ottoman support and defeated him. Sources differ as to the circumstances of Vlad's death: according to some accounts, he was killed in battle, while others state that he was slain by his own men. After Vlad's violent death, Justina was widowed for a second time. According to Hasan and Cazacu, Justina was the mother of Vlad's second son and namesake, who became the ancestor of the Hungarian noble Dracula family. In contrast, Fedeles and Simon write that Vlad and Justina's marriage was childless. At an unknown date, Justina granted Vlad's house in Pécs to one of her retainers, Dénes, "in reward for his faithful service".

=== Third and fourth marriages ===
Justina's third and fourth marriages strengthened her claims to the Transylvanian estates. In early 1478, members of the Erdélyi family brought a lawsuit against her over the castle of Gornești and the surrounding villages. Matthias Corvinus upheld his cousin's possession of the estates, and Justina later married Paul Suki, a nephew of Michael Suki, from whom part of the property had been confiscated. She is recorded as Suki's wife on 26 January 1479. He died later that year, after which disputes arose between Justina and his relatives. About two years later, Justina married John Erdélyi of Somkerék, son of Stephen Erdélyi, a former vice-voivode of Transylvania. The marriage, in turn, strengthened the Erdélyi family's claim to the confiscated estates. John outlived Justina, who died sometime after 13 June 1497. None of the marriages produced children.

== Family tree ==
Szilágyi–Hunyadi family connections
(The family tree shows Justina as Osvát's daughter, while also indicating two other possible fathers: Ladislaus, Osvát's brother, and Francis, Osvát's son.)

Ladislaus Szilágyi † 1437/38 ∞Catherine Bellyéni †a. 1438
Elizabeth Szilágyi *c. 1410 †1483 ∞John Hunyadi †1456	Osvát Szilágyi †1448/52 ∞Agatha Pósa of Szer †a. 1452	Ladislaus Szilágyi †1455
Ladislaus Hunyadi *c. 1431 †1457	Matthias Corvinus; *1443 †1490; King of Hungary (r. 1458–1490) (1)∞Catherine of Poděbrady; *1449 †1464 (2)∞Beatrice of Naples; *1457 †1508	Francis Szilágyi	Justina Szilágyi (1)∞Wenceslas Pongrác of Szentmiklós †1474 (2)∞Vlad the Impaler †1476 (3)∞Paul Suki †1479 (4)∞John Erdélyi of Somkerék

== Sources ==
- Cazacu, Matei (2017). Dracula. BRILL. ISBN 978-90-04-34725-0.
- Csifó, Tamás (2023). "Family background of Elisabeth Szilágyi" (PDF). Belvedere meridionale. XXXV (3). Szegedi Tudományegyetem: 106–127. ISSN 1419-0222.
- Engel, Pál (2001). "Középkori magyar genealógia" [Medieval Hungarian Genealogy]. Magyar középkori adattár [Database of Medieval Hungary] (CD-ROM). Arcanum. ISBN 978-963-86118-8-8.
- Fedeles, Tamás (2010). "Drakwlyahaza" [House of Drakwlya]. In Almási, Tibor; Révész, Éva; Szabados, György (eds.). "Fons, skepsis, lex": Ünnepi tanulmányok a 70 esztendős Makk Ferenc tiszteletére ["Fons, skepsis, lex": Studies in Honor of the 70-year-old Ferenc Makk] (in Hungarian). Szegedi Középkorász Műhely. pp. 107–114. ISBN 978-963-30-6073-5.
- Florescu, Radu R.; McNally, Raymond T. (1989). Dracula, Prince of Many Faces: His Life and his Times. Back Bay Books. ISBN 978-0-316-28656-5.
- Hasan, Mihai Florin (2013). "Aspecte ale relaţiilor matrimoniale munteano-maghiare din secolele XIV-XV" [Aspects of the Hungarian-Wallachian Matrimonial Relations of the Fourteenth and Fifteenth centuries]. Revista Bistriţei (in Romanian). XXVII. Cumplexul Muzeal Bistrița-Năsăud: 128–159. ISSN 1222-5096.
- Kubinyi, András (2008). Matthias Rex. Balassi Kiadó. ISBN 978-963-506-767-1.
- Nagy, Levente; Szilágyi, Emőke Rita (2023). "Hollókőtől Esztergomig: Új adatok az Oláh, a Hunyadi és a Drakula család genealógiájához" [From Hollókő to Esztergom: New Data on the Genealogy of the Oláh, Hunyadi and Dracula Families] (PDF). Történelmi Szemle. LXV (4). Bölcsészettudományi Kutatóközpont, Történettudományi Intézet: 639–667. ISSN 0040-9634.
- Pálosfalvy, Tamás (2025). "A barátság felbonthatatlan köteléke: A késő középkori politikai szövetségekről" [The Unbreakable Bond of Friendship: On Political Alliances in the Late Middle Ages] (PDF). Századok (in Hungarian). 159 (1). Magyar Történelmi Társulat: 113–170. ISSN 0039-8098.
- Rüsz-Fogarasi, Enikő (2009). "Die Frauen des Johannes Hunyadi" [The Women of John Hunyadi]. In Dumitran, Ana; Loránd, Mándly; Simon, Alexandru (eds.). Extincta est lucerna orbis: John Hunyadi and his Time. In Memoriam Zsigmond Jakó. Mélanges d'histoire générale. Nouvelle série (in German). Vol. 2/1. Romanian Academy, Central for Transylvanian Studies; IDC Press. pp. 107–114. ISBN 978-973-1856-01-8.
- Simon, Alexandru (2011). "Propaganda and Matrimony: Dracula between Hunyadi and Habsburg" (PDF). Transylvanian Review. XV (4). Romanian Academy, Center for Transylvanian Studies: 80–90. ISSN 1221-1249.

Justina Szilágyi House of Szilágyi
Regnal titles
Preceded by Consort of Basarab Laiotă cel Bătrân	Princess Consort of Wallachia; 1476	Succeeded by Consort of Basarab Laiotă cel Bătrân
