= Margit (Erzsébet) Szilágyi =

- Countess de Szilágyi
- Spouse: Máté (Mátyus) Maróti, Ban de Macsó
- House: House of Szilágyi
- Father: Count Osvát Szilágyi
- Mother: Countess Ágota Pósa de Szer

Margit (Erzsébet) Szilágyi (? – 1504) was a Hungarian noblewoman from the House of Szilágyi, she was the wife of Máté (Mátyus) Maróti, Ban de Macsó, also Ispán of Bács, Baranya, Bodrog, Syrmia, Tolna and Valkó Counties. Margit (Erzsébet) Szilágyi was the daughter-in-law of László Maróti, Ban de Macsó and Erzsébet Schaunberg
