= Zsófia Szilágyi =

- Spouse: Péter Geréb de Vingárt, vice-voivode of Transylvania
- Issue: István; Lõrinc; Péter, Hetman of Oberschlesien and Palatine of the Kingdom of Hungary; Mátyás, Ban of Croatia and Ban of Slavonia; László, Archbishop of Kalocsa
- House: House of Szilágyi (by birth)
- Father: Count Ladislaus Szilágyi
- Mother: Catherine Bellyéni

Zsófia Szilágyi (Hungarian: Szilágyi Zsófia) was a Hungarian noblewoman from the House of Szilágyi. She was the daughter of László Szilágyi and Katalin Bellyéni. Zsófia Szilágyi was the wife of Péter Geréb de Vingárt, vice-voivode of Transylvania.

Zsófia Szilágyi had the following children:

- István
- Lõrinc
- Péter, which was Hetman of Oberschlesien and Palatine of the Kingdom of Hungary, he married Dorottya Kanizsai
- Mátyás, which was Ban of Croatia (1483–1489) and Ban of Slavonia
- László (born after 1447 - d. 25.7.1502), which was Archbishop of Kalocsa
