= Gergely Szilágyi =

Hungarian nobleman

- Count de Szilágyi, Lord of Szarvaskő
- Noble family: House of Szilágyi
- Spouse: Ankó Czobor de Czoborszentmihály
- Father: László Szilágyi

Count Gergely Szilágyi (was born at the end of the 14th century), was a Hungarian nobleman, Lord of the Castle of Szarvaskő, member of the House of Szilágyi, uncle of Erzsébet Szilágyi and Michael Szilágyi.

== Sources ==
- Fraknói Vilmos: Michael Szilágyi, The uncle of King Matthias (Bp., 1913)
- W.Vityi Zoltán: King Matthias maternal relatives
- Felsőmagyarországi Minerva: nemzeti folyó-irás, Volumul 6
