= John Geréb de Vingárt =

Hungarian nobleman

John Geréb de Vingárt (sometimes referred to as Vingard), (b.???? - d.????) was a Hungarian nobleman who served as Vice-Voivode of Transylvania (1450-1458) under the Regent of Hungary Michael Szilágyi and rose to the position of governor (1445-1460) under Emeric III Bebek, who was killed at the Battle of Kosovo (1448).

The complete list of where he served: vice-voivode of Transylvania between 1450 and 1450; a castellan of Görgény in 1440 and 1450; governor of Transylvania in 1445–1450, then again in 1458–1460; royal captain of Transylvania in 1459; and vice-governor of Transylvania in 1460.

He served the Hungarian crown loyally for many years, and was eventually rewarded for his service: his son Matthias Gereb received Castle Făgăraș.

He probably commissioned the manor house in Vingard in 1458.

He was a trustee of John Hunyadi, and married John Hunyadi's sister-in-law Sophia Szilágyi who was the sister of Elizabeth Szilágyi.

Geréb was a loyal follower of Władysław II, to the extent of trying to kill Vlad the Impaler while he was imprisoned under John Hunyadi.

He was the only vice-voivode to receive the tiles of magnificus and egregius.

He had five sons: Stephen, Lawrence, Ladislas, Peter and Matthias. Peter followed in his footsteps became captain of Upper Silesia (1476), voivode of Transylvania, Count of the Székelys (1477–1479) and Count Palatine (1500–1503). He gained much favour from his cousin Matthias Corvinus. Stephen died at thirty and Lawrence died as a child. Ladislas entered the church, serving as bishop of Transylvania at Alba Iulia (1476–1501) and archbishop of Kalocsa in the Archdiocese of Kalocsa–Kecskemét. He died in 1502 and was buried in the convent in Šarengrad.
