= Osvát Laskai =

Hungarian Franciscan friar

Osvát Laskai (Latin: Osvaldus Lasco; 1450, Laskó, Baranya county – June 10, 1511, Pest? ) was a Hungarian Franciscan friar, preacher, teacher of theology, head of the friaries of Esztergom and Pest.

== Works ==
- Quadragesimale Bige salutis. U. ott, 1498., 1501., 1506. and 1515.
- Sermones dominicales pertutiles a quodam fratre Hungaro ordinis minorum de observantia comportati Biga salutis intitulati feliciter incipiunt. Hagenau, 1498., 1502., 1506. and 1515.
- Sermones de sanctis perutiles. U. ott, 1499., 1502., 1506. and 1516.
- Sermones dominicales pertutiles. U. ott, 1499. és 1516.
- Quadragesimale Gemma fidei intitulatum tractans de sacrosancta orthodoxaq. fide catholica ... U. ott, 1507.
- Pelbartus de Temeswar, Aureum Rosarium Theologie. Hagenau, 1503., 1504., 1507. and 1508. Four volumes
- In the Glossaries of Gyöngyös: Constitutiones familiae Hungariae observantium, cura vicarialis fratri Osvaldi de Lasko, in capitulo Athyensi 1499. editas cum additionibus probabiliter et statutis Pakosiensibus, descriptas manu cujusdam Fratris Ladislai a. 1512
