= Gyula Benczúr =

Hungarian painter and art teacher (1844–1920)

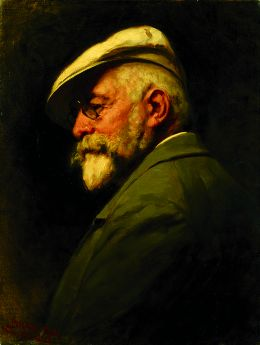
1917 self-portrait of Benczúr

Gyula Benczúr (28 January 1844 – 16 July 1920) was a Hungarian painter and art teacher. An "outstanding exponent of academicism", he specialized in portraits and historical scenes. He is "considered one of the greatest Hungarian masters of historicism".

== Biography ==
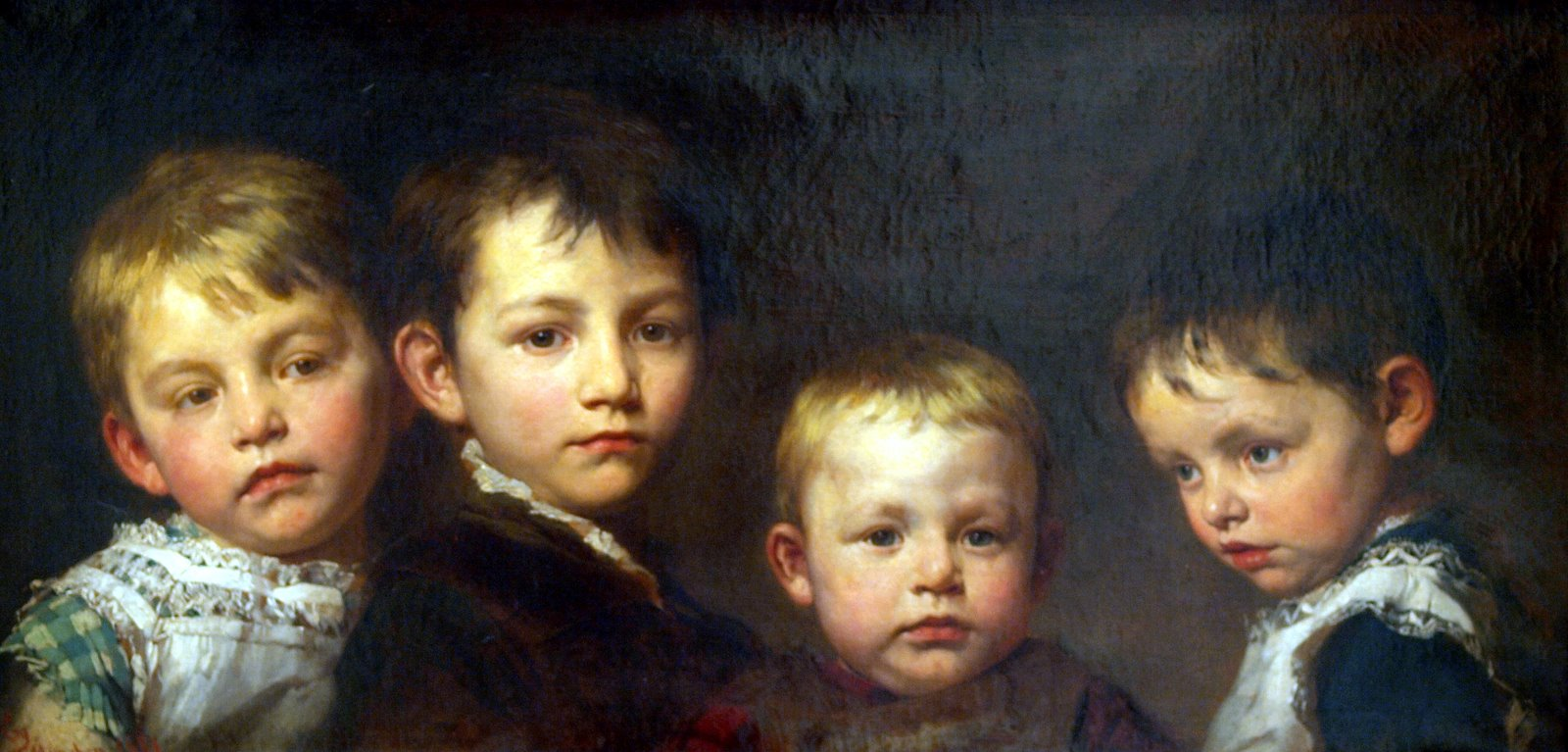
My children (1881)

Benczúr was born in the city of Nyíregyháza on 28 January 1844, to Vilmos Benczúr and Paulina Laszgallner. He came from an old noble family on his father's side. His family moved to Kassa (now Košice) when he was still very young and he displayed an early talent for drawing. He began his studies in 1861 with Hermann Anschutz and Johann Georg Hiltensperger (1806–1890). From 1865 to 1869, he studied with Karl von Piloty. In 1869, Benczúr traveled to Italy to pursue further studies.

He achieved international success in 1870 when he won the Hungarian national competition for historical painting with his depiction of King Stephen's baptism. He then assisted Piloty with the frescoes at the Maximilianeum and the Rathaus in Munich and illustrated books by the great German writer, Friedrich Schiller. King Ludwig II of Bavaria gave him several commissions. In 1873, in Munich, he married Lina, the sister of the Munich painter Gabriel von Max. In the summer of 1874, the king sent him to France to study at Fontainebleau.

He was named a Professor at the Academy of Fine Arts, Munich, in 1875. Soon after, he built a home in Ambach on Lake Starnberg; designed by his brother Béla. In 1883, he returned to Hungary, where he continued to be an art teacher. One of his most distinguished pupils was the Swiss-born American painter Adolfo Müller-Ury. Benczúr was later a favorite among the Hungarian upper-class, painting numerous portraits of kings and aristocrats. He also created some religious works; notably altarpieces for St. Stephen's Basilica and Buda Castle.

He was an honorary member of the Hungarian Academy of Sciences. He spent his last years in Dolány, Nógrád county, in northern Hungary. Following his death the village was named Benczúrfalva in honor of him.

In 2019 the National Bank of Hungary issued new silver coins to mark the 175th anniversary of Benczúr's birth. In 2020, in commemoration of the 100th anniversary of Benczúr's death, the Embassy of Hungary in Azerbaijan, with the support of the Embassy of the Republic of Azerbaijan in Hungary, the Ministry of Education of the Republic of Azerbaijan, held an art contest for Azerbaijani children between the ages of 6 and 17.

Streets have been named after him in Balassagyarmat, Balatonkenese, Berettyóújfalu, Bonyhád, Budapest, Debrecen, Jászberény, Komló, Pécs, Szabadszállás, Szeged and Košice.

His daughters Olga (1875–1962) and Ida (1876–1970) also became well-known artists.

== Selected paintings ==
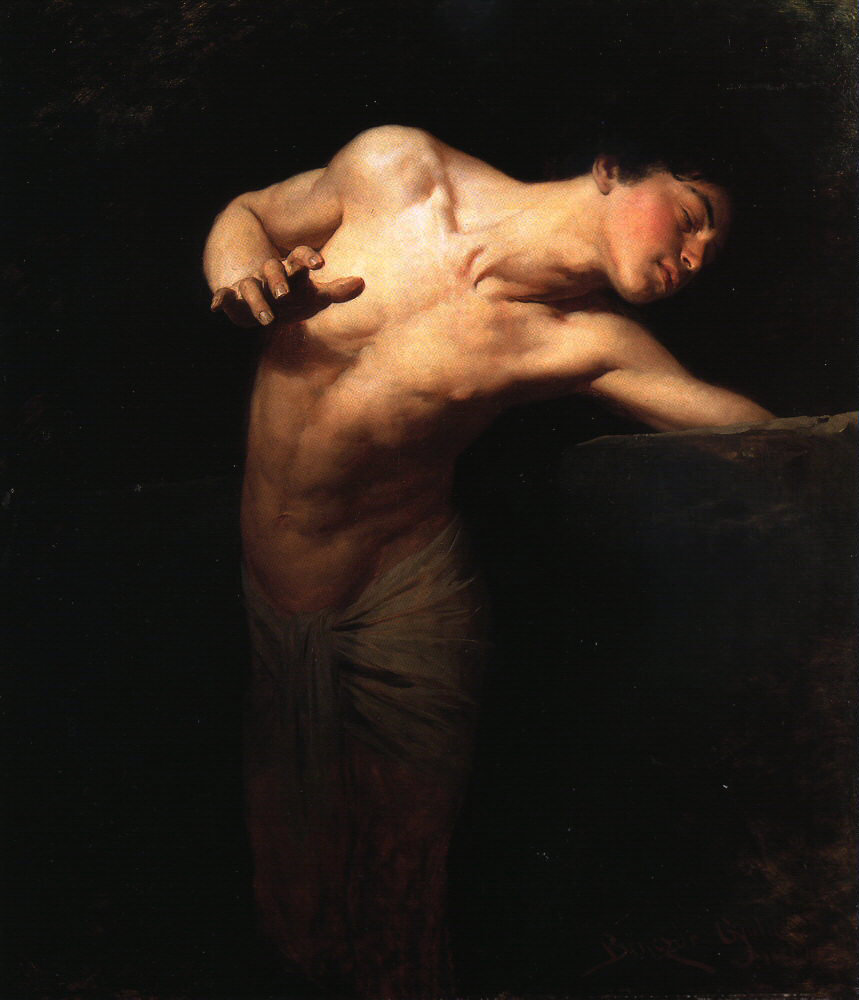
Narcissus

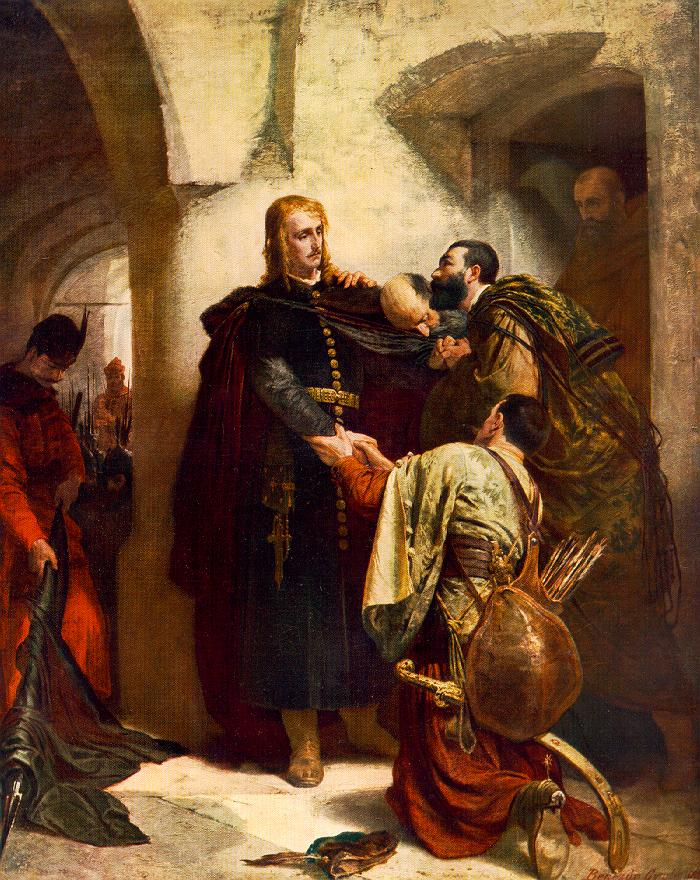
Ladislaus Hunyadi's Farewell

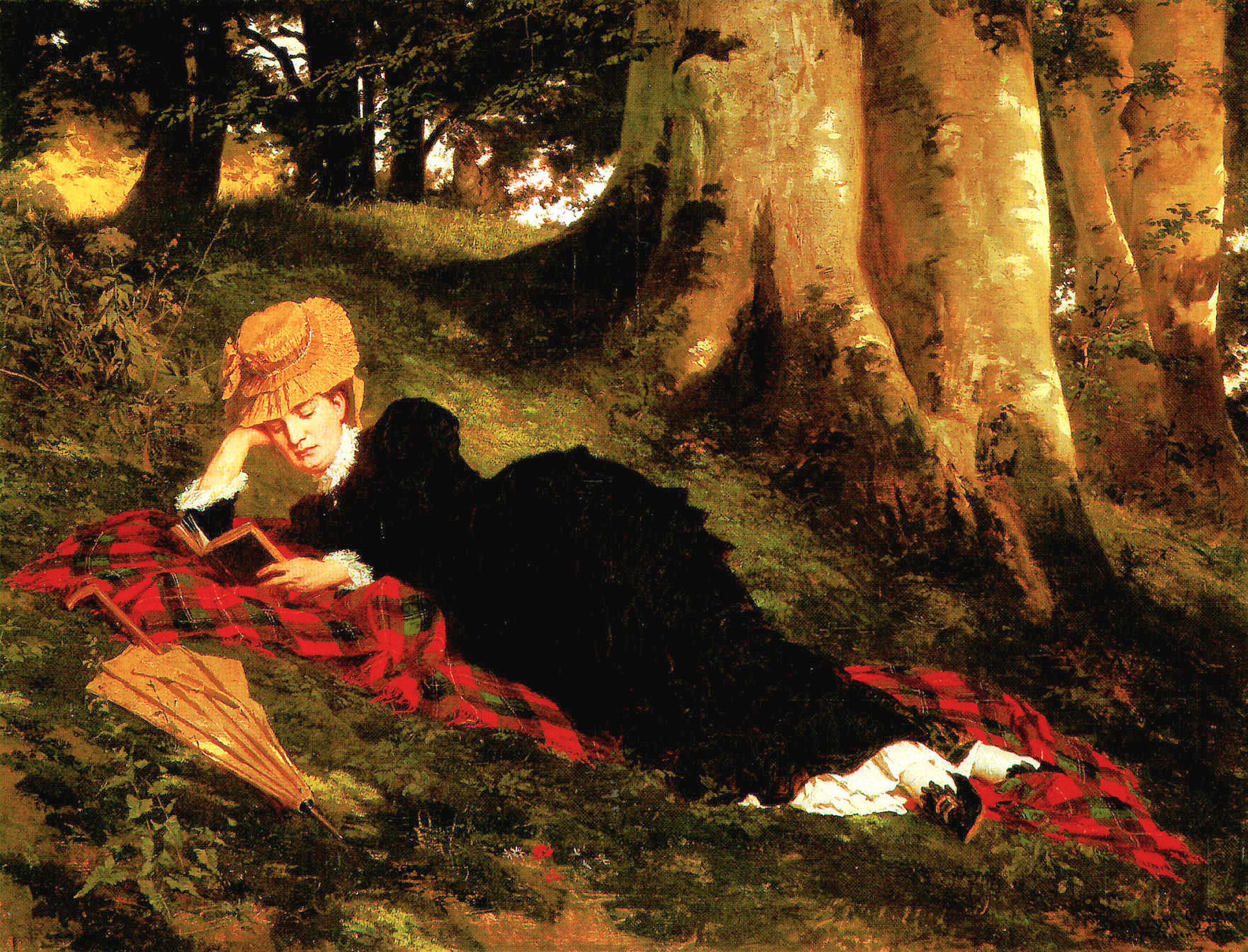
Reading in the Woods

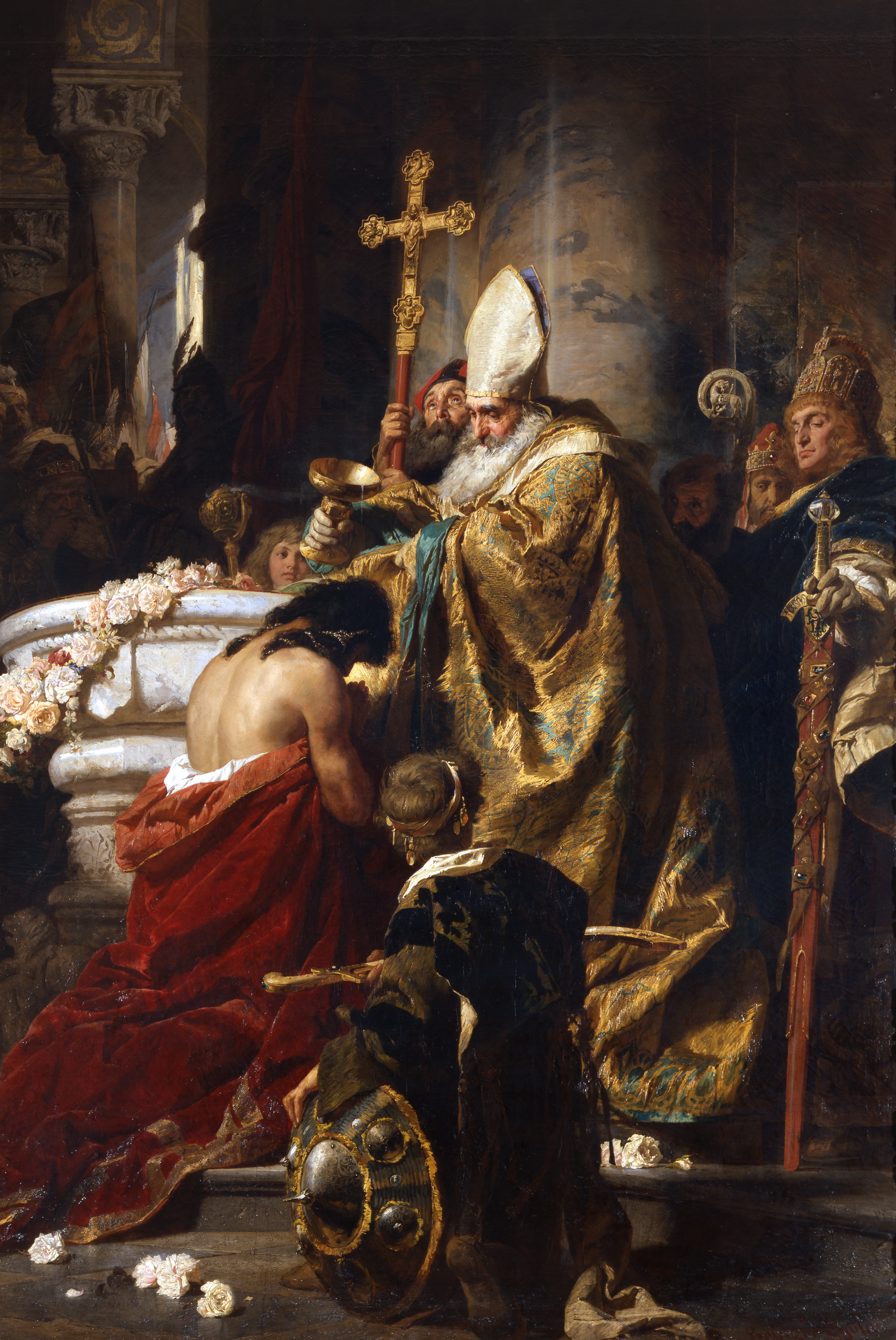
The Baptism of Vajk

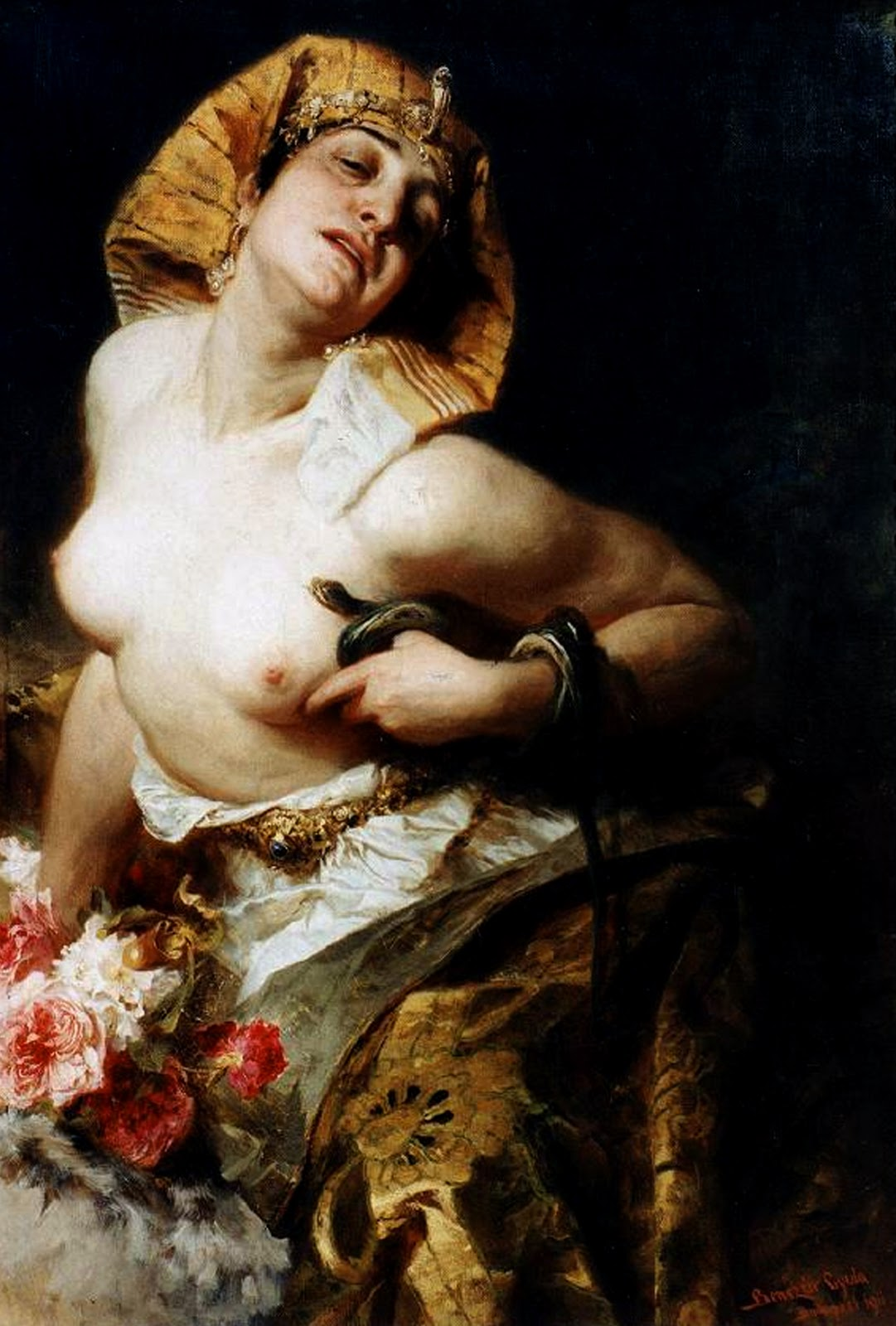
Cleopatra

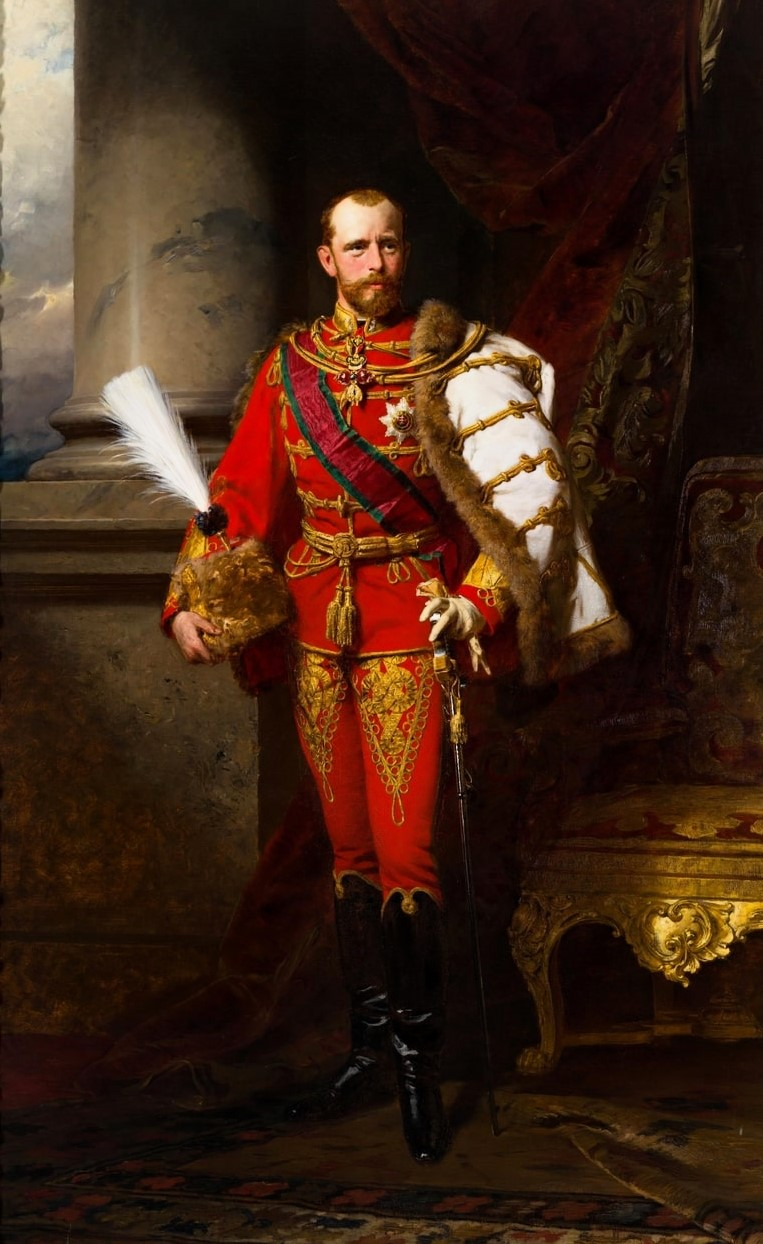
Rudolf, Crown Prince of Austria

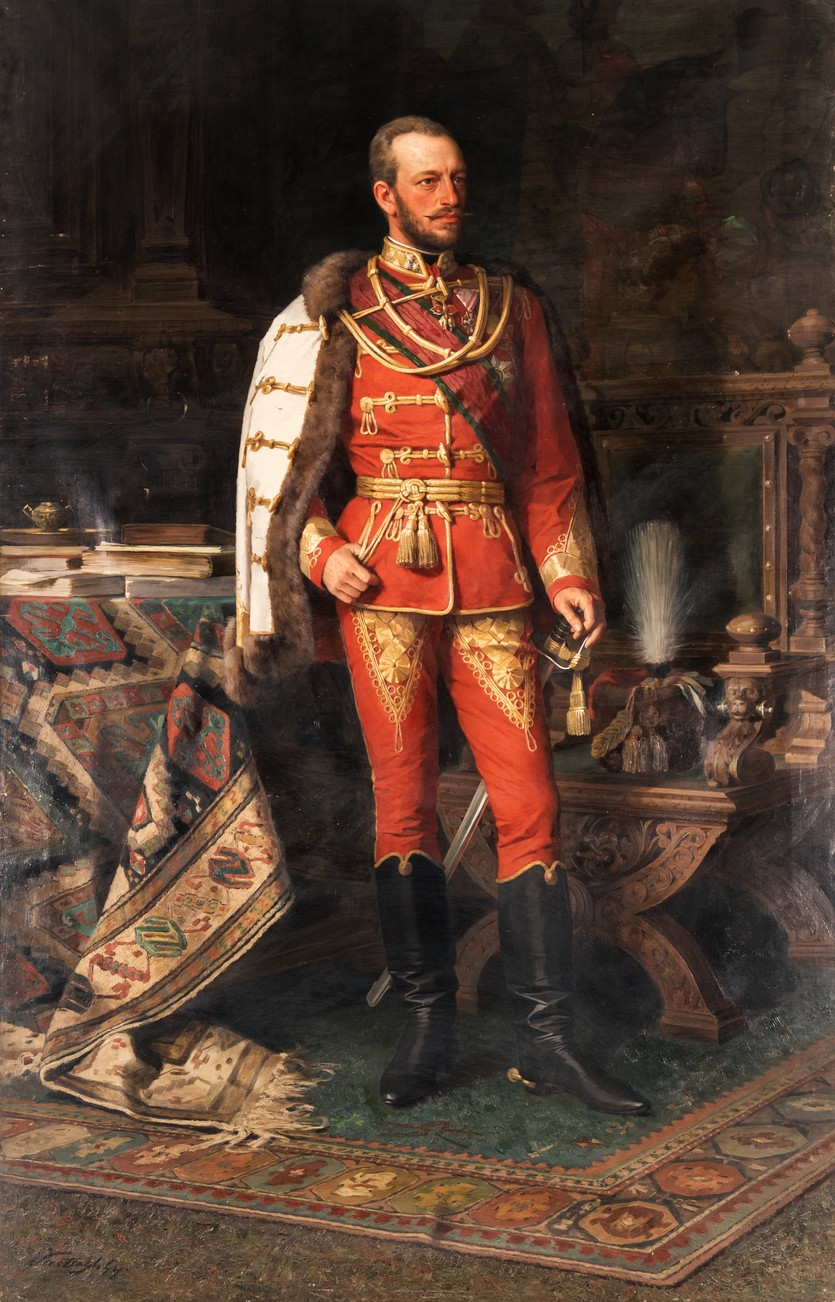
Archduke Joseph Karl of Austria

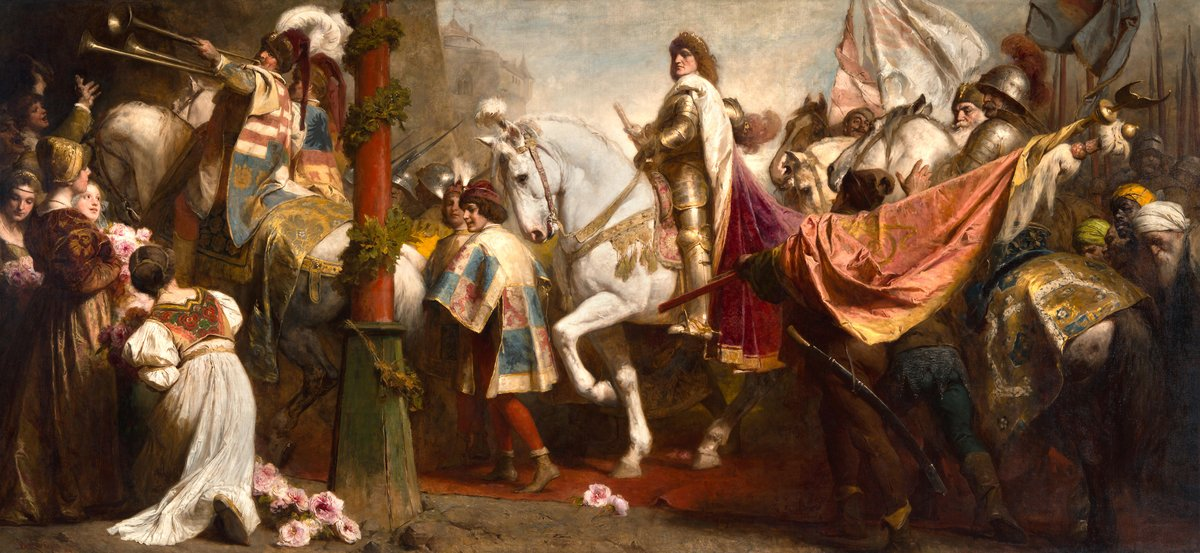
The triumphant Matthias (1919, Hungarian National Gallery, Budapest)

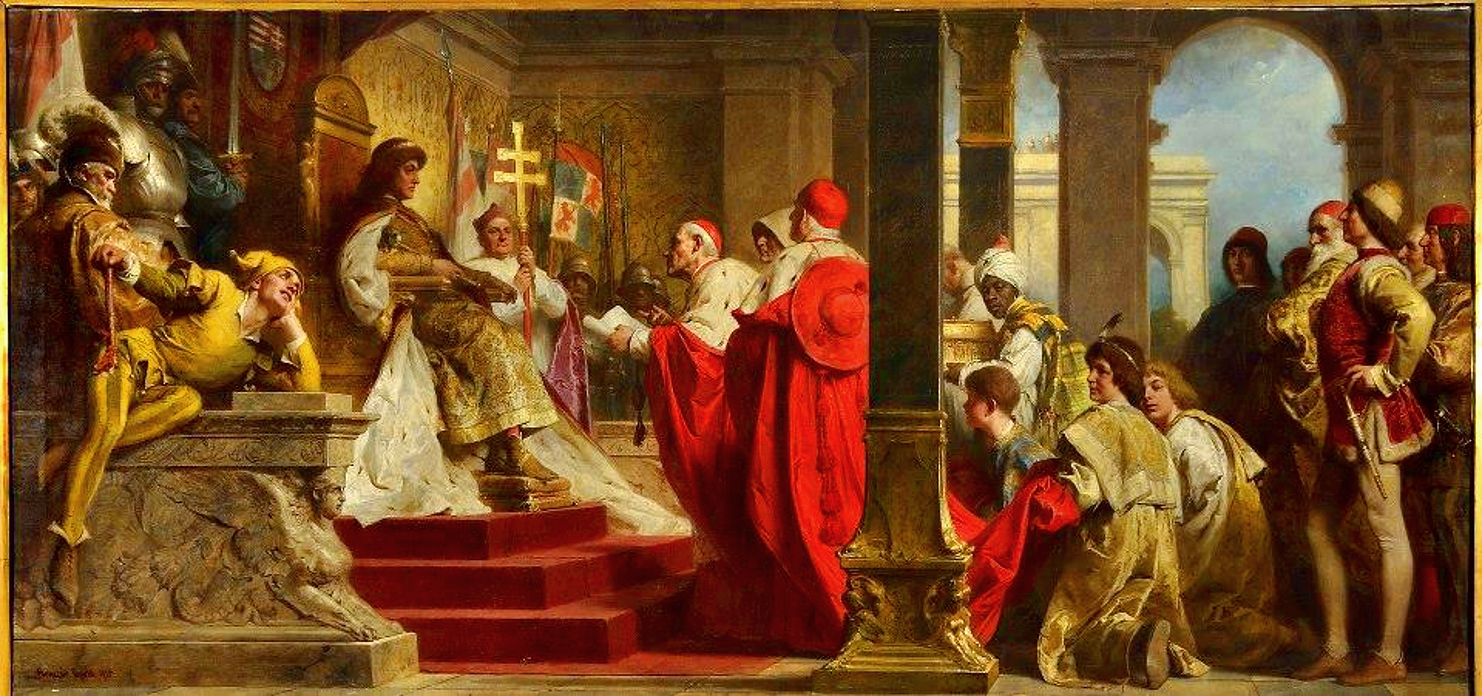
King Matthias receives the Papal Legates (1915).

== Sources ==
- Gyula Benczúr, Exposition Memoriale. Budapest: Hungarian National Museum, 1958
- Gábor Ö. Pogány,. Nineteenth Century Hungarian Painting, (1958) Reprint, Budapest: Corvina Press, 1972
- Katalin Telepy, Benczúr. Nyíregyháza, Hungary: Jósa András Múzeum, 1963
- Antal Kampis, The History of Art in Hungary. Budapest: Corvina Press, 1966
