= Garázda =

- Country: Kingdom of Hungary; Transylvania; Szilágy County; Wallachia; Bulgarian Empire
- Founded: 12th century
- Titles: Queen Mother of Hungary; Regent of Hungary; Voivode of Transylvania; Princess Consort of Wallachia; Count of Beszterce (Bistrița); Vice-ispán of Bács County, Ban of Macsó; Noble; Counts of the Holy Roman Empire; Chancellor of Transylvania
- Cadet branches: House of Szilágyi; House of Szilágyi-Hunyadi; House of Szilágyi-Borosjenő; House of Szilágyi-Székelykocsárd; House of Szilágyi-Oaș; House of Szilágyi-Piskárkos; House of Szilágyi-Ákosfalvi; House of Szilágyi-Báthor; House of Teleki

The Garázda is an old Hungarian aristocratic family. The family has two major branches the House of Szilágyi and the House of Teleki. Lóránd Szilágyi de Garázda is the ancestor of the House of Szilágyi.

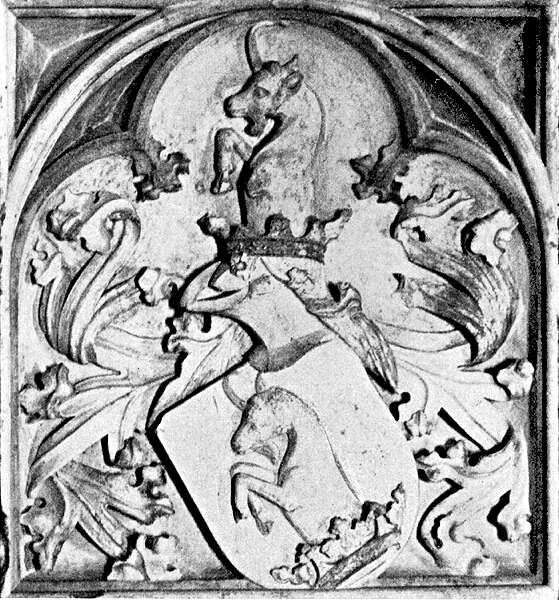
The ancient coat of arms of the House of Szilágyi

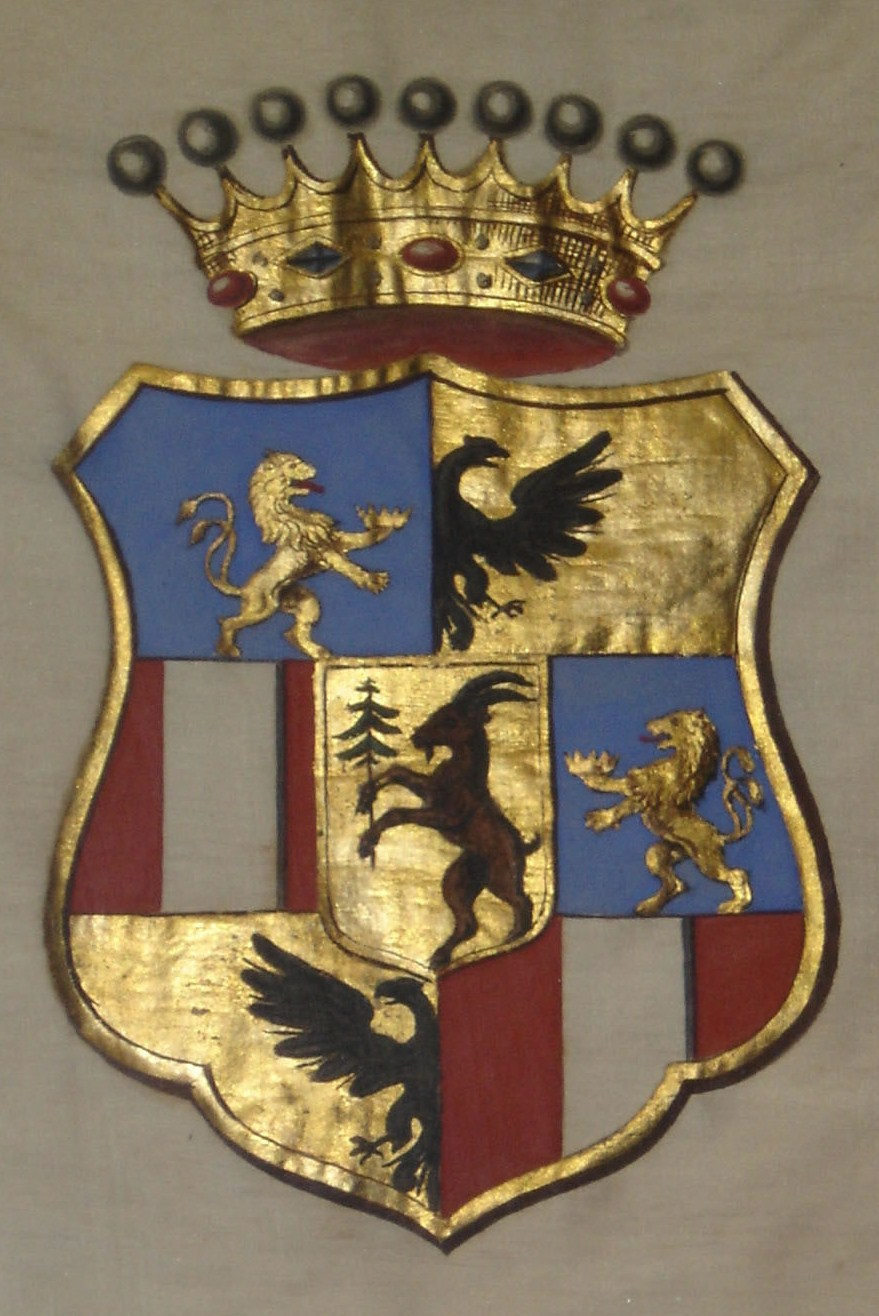
coat of arms of the House of Teleki

== See also ==
- House of Szilágyi
- House of Teleki
