= John Rozgonyi =

- Voivode of Transylvania; Judge Royal of the Kingdom of Hungary
- Spouse: Orsolya Szilágyi
- Issue: John, András, István, Apollónia
- House: Rozgonyi

John Rozgonyi (Hungarian: Rozgonyi János; c. ? – 1471) was voivode of Transylvania in 1441–1458 and in 1459–1461 (for the second time), also ispán of Sopron and Vas Counties (1449–1454), count of the Székelys (1457–1458), Judge Royal of the Kingdom of Hungary. He was married to Orsolya Szilágyi from the House of Szilágyi, they had the following children: John, András, István, Apollónia (who married Benedek Csáky).

== Sources ==
- (Hungarian) Engel, Pál (1996). Magyarország világi archontológiája, 1301–1457, I. ("Secular Archontology of Hungary, 1301–1457, Volume I"). História, MTA Történettudományi Intézete. Budapest. ISBN 963-8312-44-0.
- (Hungarian) Markó, László (2000). A magyar állam főméltóságai Szent Istvántól napjainkig: Életrajzi Lexikon ("Great Officers of State in Hungary from King Saint Stephen to Our Days: A Biographical Encyclopedia"). Magyar Könyvklub. ISBN 963-547-085-1
- Engel, Pál (2001). The Realm of St Stephen: A History of Medieval Hungary, 895–1526. I.B. Tauris Publishers. ISBN 1-86064-061-3.
