= Osvát =

Osvát or Ozsvát is an old Hungarian masculine given name. It's the archaic form of the Hungarian "Oszvald". The name comes from the Germanic given name Oswald. It may refer to:

- Osvát Laskai (15th century), Hungarian Franciscan friar
- Osvát Szilágyi (15th century), Hungarian nobleman
