= Orsolya Szilágyi =

- Spouse: John Rozgonyi
- Issue: John, András, István, Apollónia
- House: House of Szilágyi (by birth)
- Father: count Ladislaus Szilágyi
- Mother: Catherine Bellyéni
- Religion: Roman Catholic

Orsolya Szilágyi (Hungarian: Szilágyi Orsolya) was a Hungarian noblewoman from the House of Szilágyi, she was the daughter of count László (Ladislaus) Szilágyi and Katalin Bellyéni. Orsolya Szilágyi was the wife of John Rozgonyi, which was voivode of Transylvania between 1441–1458 and between 1459–1461 (for the second time), also ispán of Sopron and Vas Counties (1449–1454), count of the Székelys (1457–1458). They had the following children: John, András, István, Apollónia (who married Benedek Csáky).

== Sources ==
- (Hungarian) Engel, Pál (1996). Magyarország világi archontológiája, 1301–1457, I. ("Secular Archontology of Hungary, 1301–1457, Volume I"). História, MTA Történettudományi Intézete. Budapest. ISBN 963-8312-44-0.
- (Hungarian) Markó, László (2000). A magyar állam főméltóságai Szent Istvántól napjainkig: Életrajzi Lexikon ("Great Officers of State in Hungary from King Saint Stephen to Our Days: A Biographical Encyclopedia"). Magyar Könyvklub. ISBN 963-547-085-1
- Engel, Pál (2001). The Realm of St Stephen: A History of Medieval Hungary, 895–1526. I.B. Tauris Publishers. ISBN 1-86064-061-3.

Orsolya Szilágyi House of Szilágyi
Regnal titles
Preceded by Consorts of Emeric Bebek	Consort of the Voivode of Transylvania; 1441–1461	Succeeded by Consorts of Sebastian Rozgonyi
Preceded by Consorts of Rénold Rozgonyi	Consort Countess of the Székelys; 1441–1446	Succeeded by Consort of Osvát Rozgonyi
