= Miklós Szilágyi =

Hungarian nobleman

- Count de Szilágyi
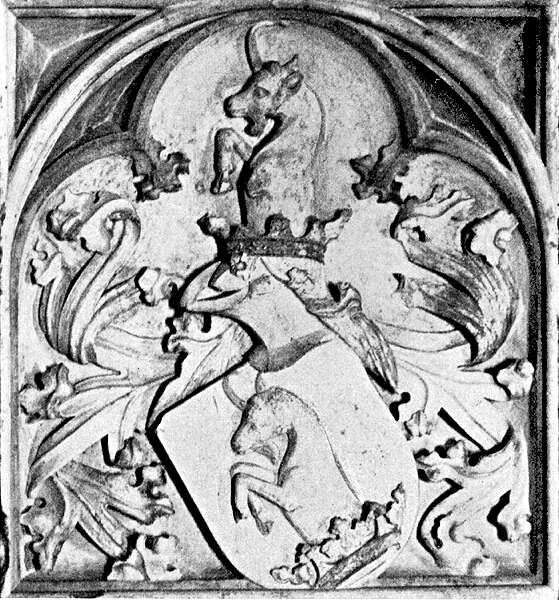
- Coat of arms
- Born: c. 1345
- Died: 11 January 1409
- Noble family: House of Szilágyi
- Issue: Ladislaus Szilágyi; Mihály I Szilágyi; László Szilágyi; Orsolya Szilágyi; Zsófia Szilágyi
- Father: Lóránd Szilágyi

Miklós Szilágyi de Alsó-Baksán et Nagy-Dobán (c. 1345 – 11 Jan 1409), was a Hungarian nobleman, a member of the House of Szilágyi, grandfather of Erzsébet Szilágyi and Michael Szilágyi, and the maternal great-grandfather of King Matthias of Hungary

== Family ==
He had 5 children:

- Ladislaus (Bernolt László) Szilágyi
- Mihály I Szilágyi
- László Szilágyi
- Orsolya Szilágyi
- Zsófia Szilágyi

== Sources ==
- Fraknói Vilmos: Michael Szilágyi, The uncle of King Matthias (Bp., 1913)
- W. Vityi Zoltán: King Matthias maternal relatives
- Felsőmagyarországi Minerva: nemzeti folyó-irás, Volumul 6
