= Matthias Geréb =

Ban of Croatia

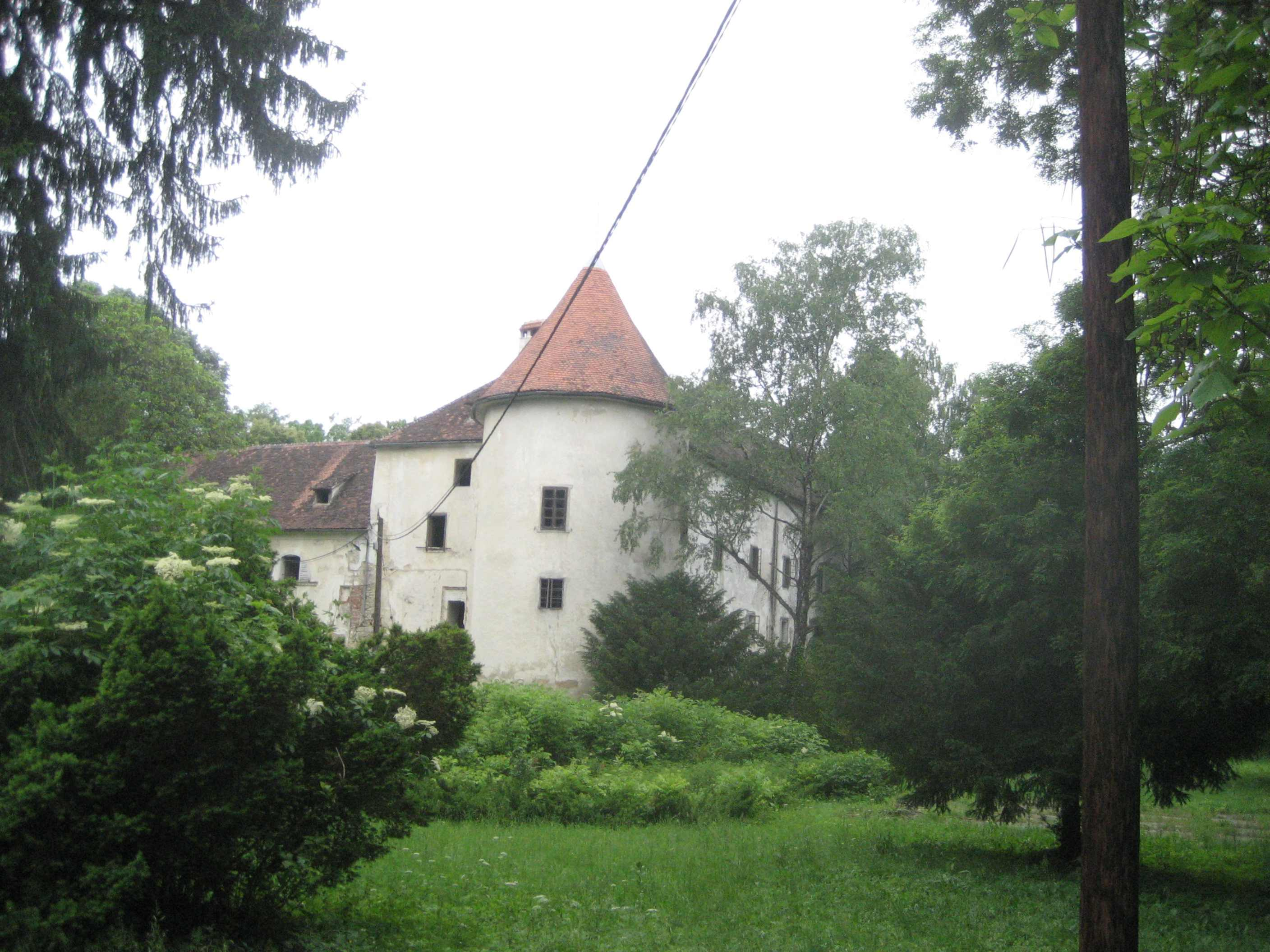
Erdődy Castle in Jastrebarsko, Croatia, originally built by Matthias Geréb

Matthias Geréb (Hungarian: Geréb Mátyás, Croatian: Matija Gereb) was the ban of Croatia from 1483 to 1489. He was the son of John Geréb de Vingárt (Hungarian branch of the Croatian House of Kačić), who was a vice-voivode of Transylvania, and Zsófia Szilágyi from the House of Szilágyi.

Geréb is known to have participated in the retaking of Jajce from the Ottoman Empire along with Matthias Corvinus in 1463. Later, as ban, he also defeated the Ottomans in the Battle of Una in 1483.

Geréb is known to have built a castle in the town of Jastrebarsko, now known as Erdődy Castle after the household Erdődy that later owned it. He died in 1489.

Preceded by Blaž Podmanicki	Ban of Croatia; 1483–1489	Succeeded by Ladislaus Egervári
