= Ágnes Geréb =

Ágnes Geréb (born 20 December 1952) is a Hungarian gynaecologist, midwife and psychologist. She is the pioneer of including paternal participation in deliveries of children at hospitals and in homebirths in Hungary. She founded the Napvilág birthing centre. Geréb has helped deliver 3,500 babies at home.

Geréb's license to practice medicine was revoked for 3 years in 2007 as punishment for the death of a newborn in 2000, and in 2009 she was charged with manslaughter relating to an earlier home birth when a baby died after a difficult labour.

She was arrested on 5 October 2010 in Budapest, after being accused of negligent malpractice. She faced a long prison sentence. Her lawyer, Andrea Pelle, claims that the protocols of the trial were falsified. The arrest sparked outrage among home birth activists worldwide. On 23 November 2010, the British Royal College of Midwives condemned Gereb's detention. On 21 December 2010, Gereb was freed from prison and placed under house arrest. On 23 March 2011 she received a 2-year minimum security prison sentence which was pardoned on 28 June 2018 by the President of Hungary.

== Biography ==
Born in Szeged, Hungary, Geréb graduated from the University of Szeged as a Doctor of Medicine, in 1977. She finished special training in Obstetrics, (1982). In 1986 she obtained a B.Sc. in Psychology at the Eötvös Loránd University, Budapest. In 1990 she participated in a 6-month training in professional practice of home births in a birth centre of Livermore. Since 2005 Geréb is a certified midwife (University of Debrecen). In 2010 she obtained a B.Sc. in Midwifery from the Semmelweis University, Faculty of Health Sciences (Budapest).

Between 1977–1994 Geréb worked at the Albert Szent-Györgyi Clinical Center, at the Obstetrics and Gynaecology Department of the University of Szeged, as an obstetrician. Since 1994 she has been a staff member of Daylight Birth Centre. In 1989 she started independent midwife practice. She founded the first and the second Birth Centres in Hungary as places for non-hospital deliveries. In 1977 she started smuggling fathers into labour rooms without permission, as a punishment she was banned from practice for six months. Years later the head of the clinic declared proudly that his institute was the first to allow fathers into the labour room.

In 1997, Geréb was elected an Ashoka Fellow. She founded the Hungarian Alternatal Foundation (1992), co-founded the ENCA (European Network of Childbirth Associations) (1993) and the Association of Independent Midwives (2008). Since 1996, she participates in La Leche League International's activities.

== Achievements and aims ==
- Her first aim was to train independent midwives who could attend homebirths without her presence and this has already been achieved.
- From 1993: leading one-week-long Information Weeks with fellow midwives on pregnancy, birth and childbearing. Birth professionals and helpers around birth give lectures and lead group consultations such as midwives, health visitors, lactation consultants, psychologists
- As a part of the work of Alternatal Foundation giving lectures regularly and inviting international professionals to Hungary.
- Raising awareness about the concept of doula, holding doula trainings, which led to the foundation of MODULE (Association of Doulas in Hungary) which trains hospital doulas.
- Around 15 doulas work with Daylight Birth Center by the independent midwives.
- The general approach to the birth experience has changed over the years. Mothers who have given birth at home have helped to make this change by passing on their views. Therefore, the level of women’s demand has been raised and the hospitals were forced to make changes – though sometimes only of cosmetic type. In the overall though this has helped in moving towards humanising hospital births in Hungary.
