= Szarvaskő =

- Village (község)
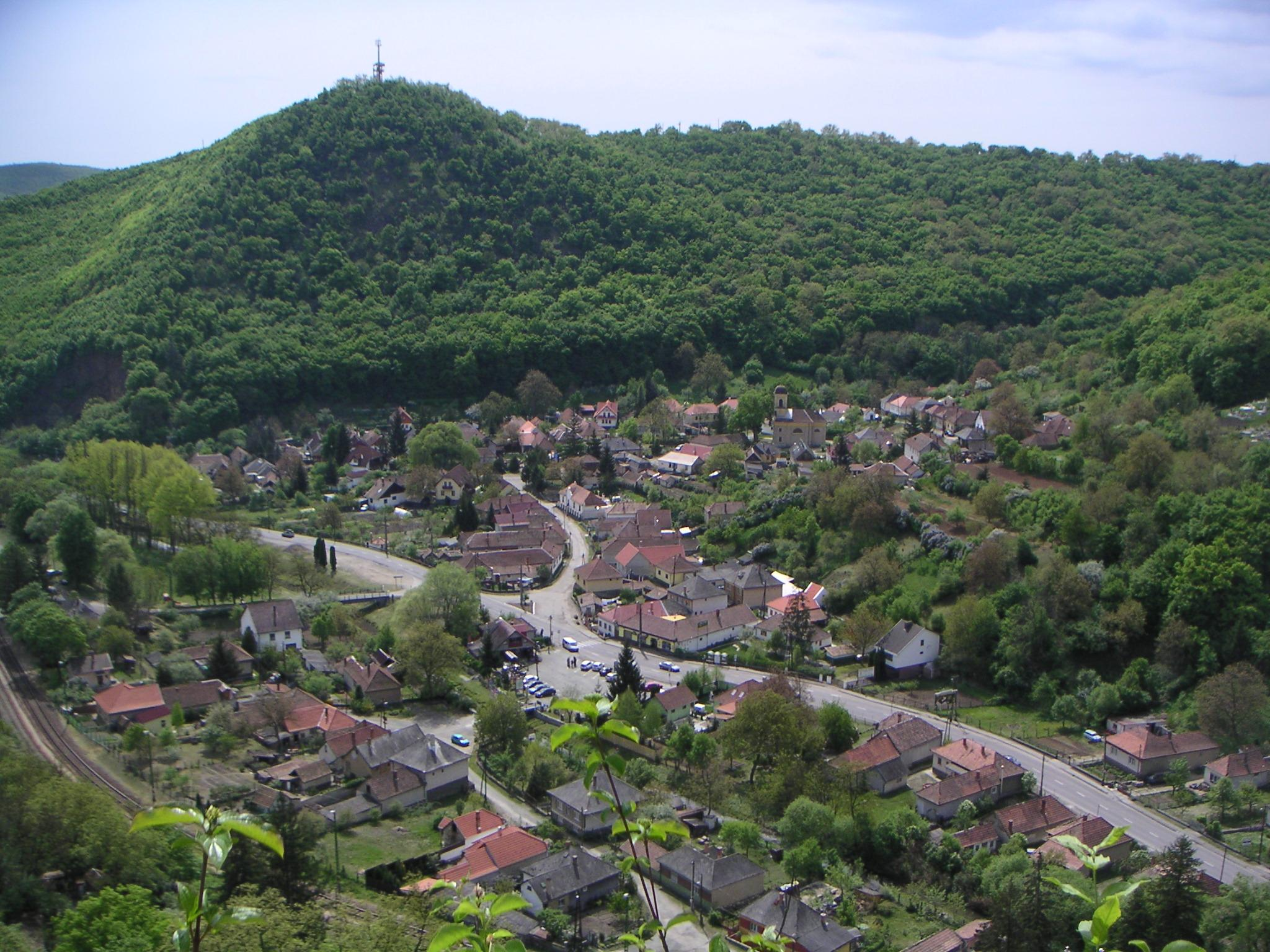

- Flag Coat of arms

- Location of Szarvaskő in Hungary
- Coordinates: 47°59′17″N 20°19′51″E
- Country: Hungary
- Region: Northern Hungary
- County: Heves County
- Subregion: Eger District

Government
  - Mayor: Dániel Benkó

Area
  - Total: 12.59 km^{2} (4.86 sq mi)

Population (1 Jan. 2015)
  - Total: 325
  - Density: 27.32/km^{2} (70.8/sq mi)
- Time zone: UTC+1 (CET)
  - Summer (DST): UTC+2 (CEST)
- Postal code: 3323
- Area code: 36
- Website: www.szarvasko.hu

Szarvaskő is a village in Heves County, Northern Hungary Region, Hungary.

== Geography ==
The village is located on the western border of the Bükk Mountains. Because of the picturesque landscape the village is on the path of the National Blue Trail.

== Communications ==
Szarvaskő is on the Road 25 between Eger and Tarnalelesz. The Eger-Putnok railway line passes through the village, and there are 2 trains per day at the Szarvaskő railway station.

== Sights to visit ==
- Szarvaskő Castle Ruin
- Major-tetői kilátó (Major Lookout)
- Roman Catholic church
- Öko-Park Panzió-Kemping és Kalandpark (English: leisure-camping and adventure park)

== Gallery ==
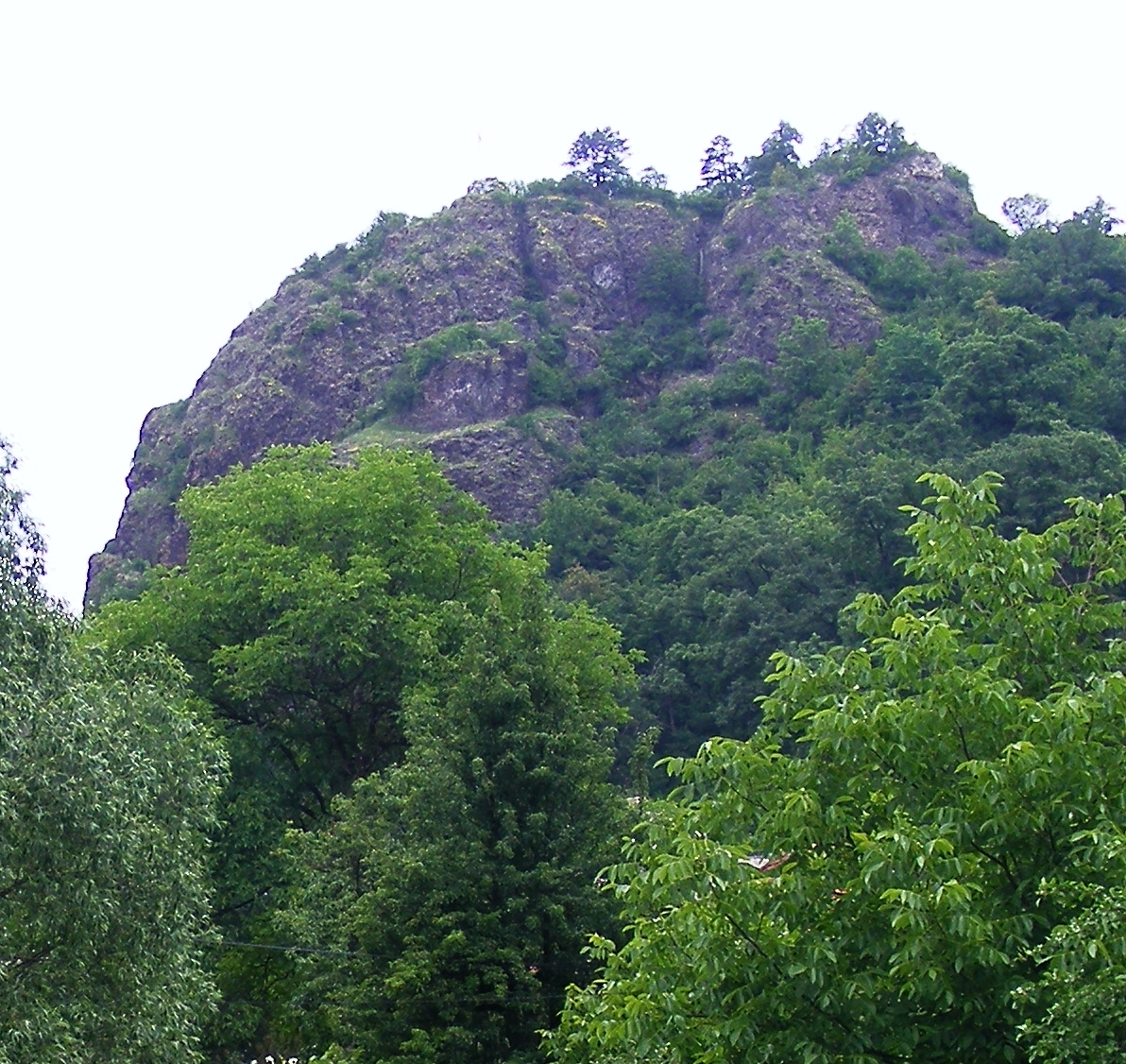
The hill with the Szarvaskő castle ruin

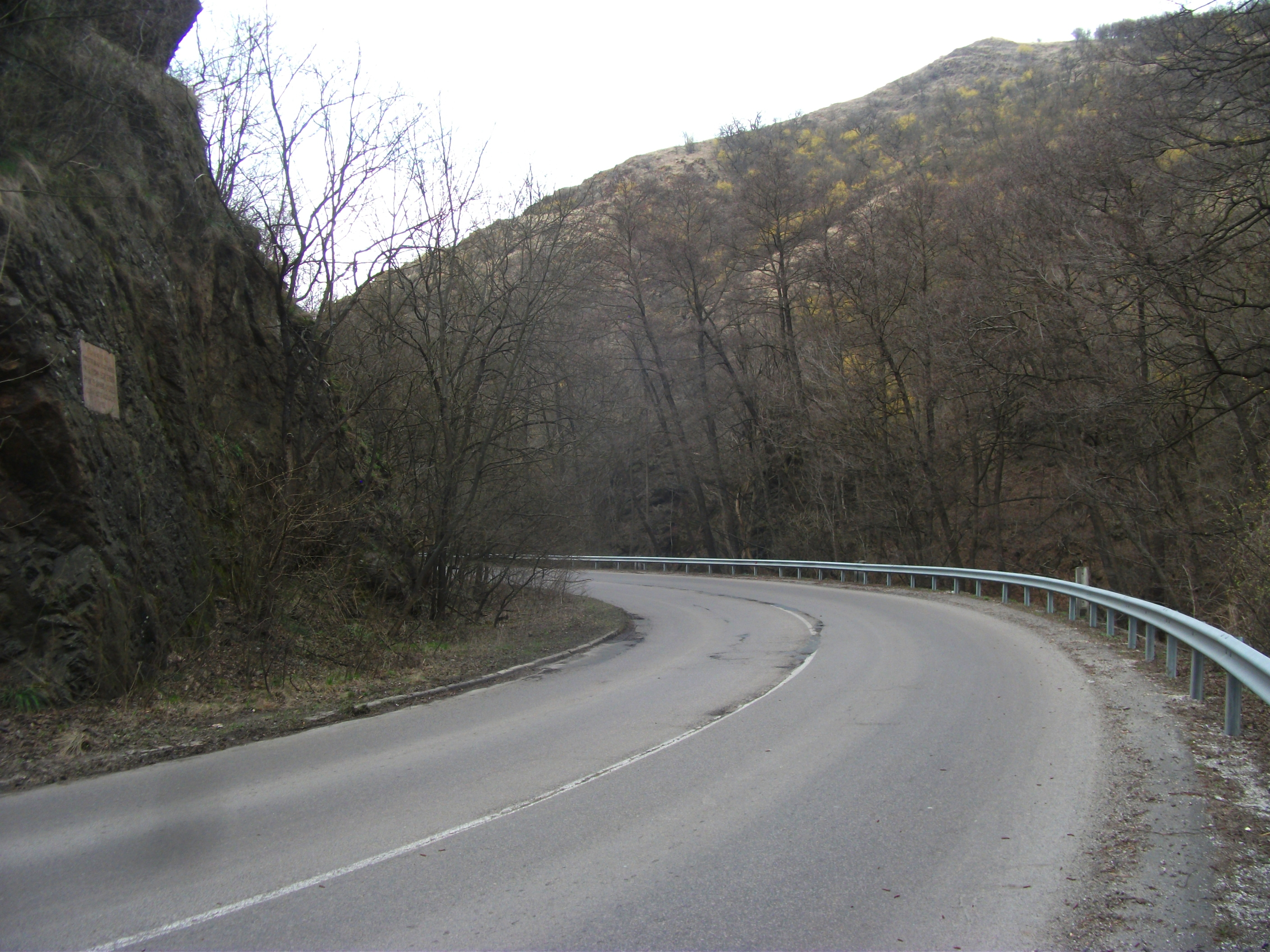
The Pyrker Strait at the border of Szarvaskő with the memorial plaque (on the left side of the picture)

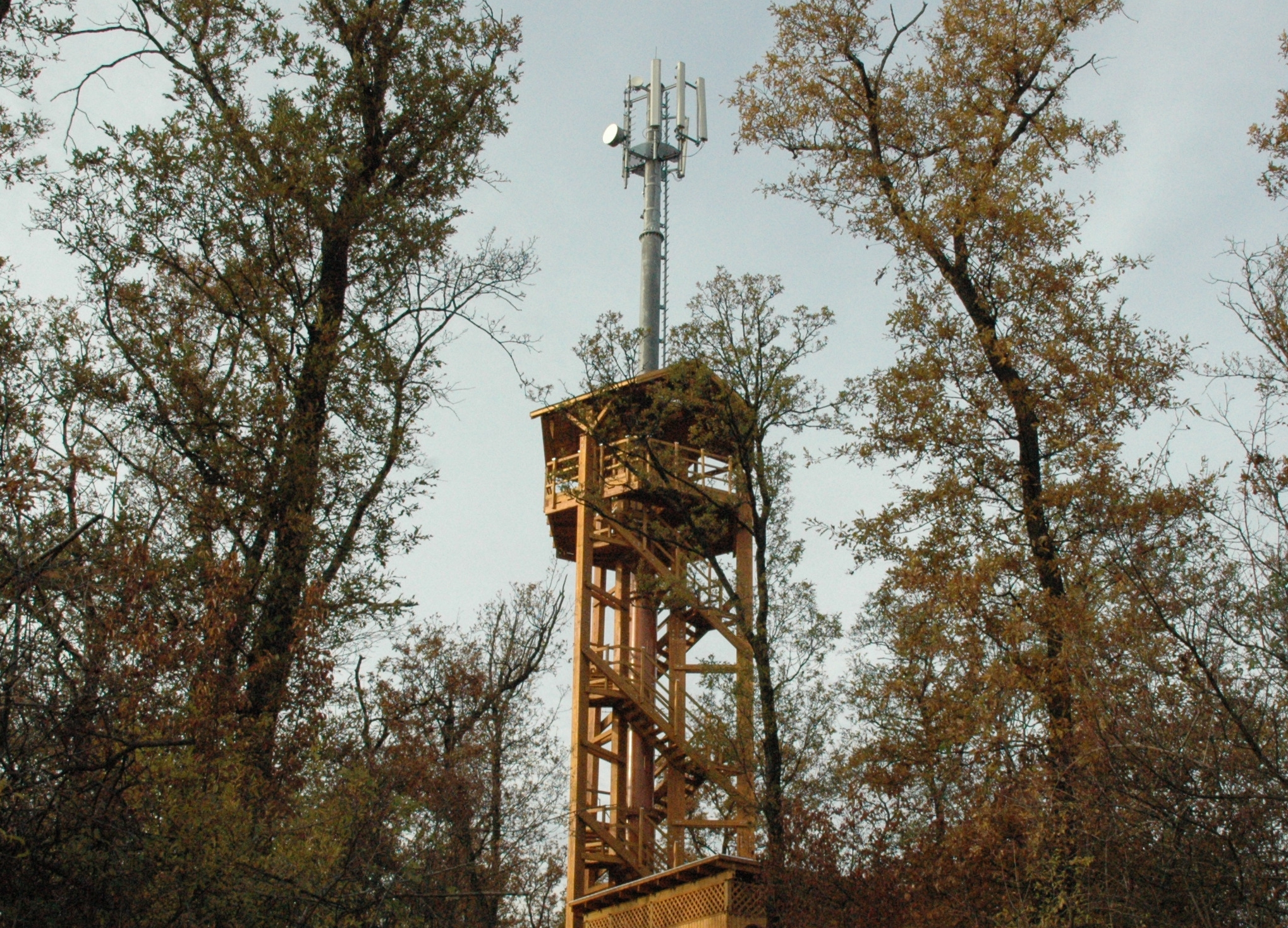
The Major Lookout

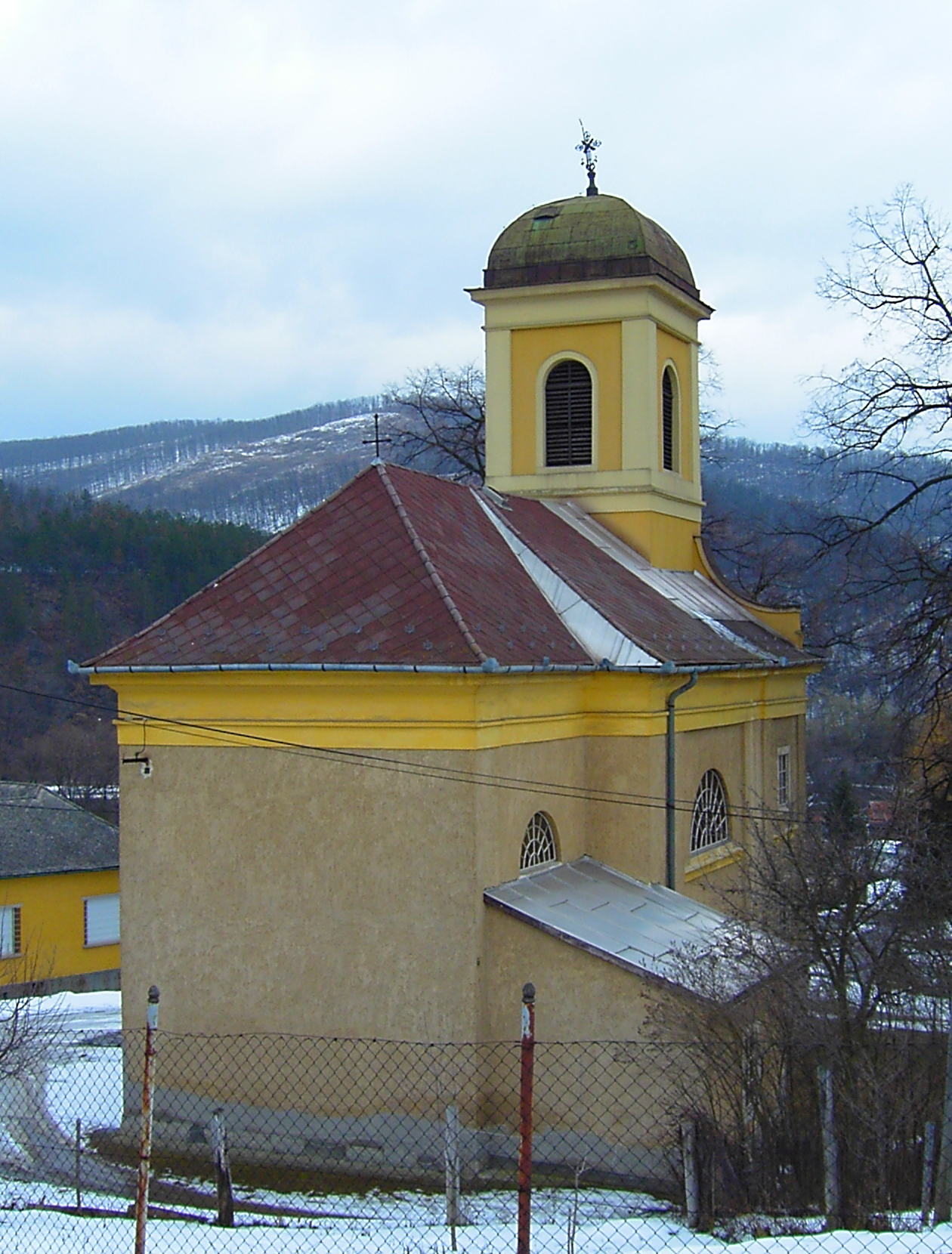
The church

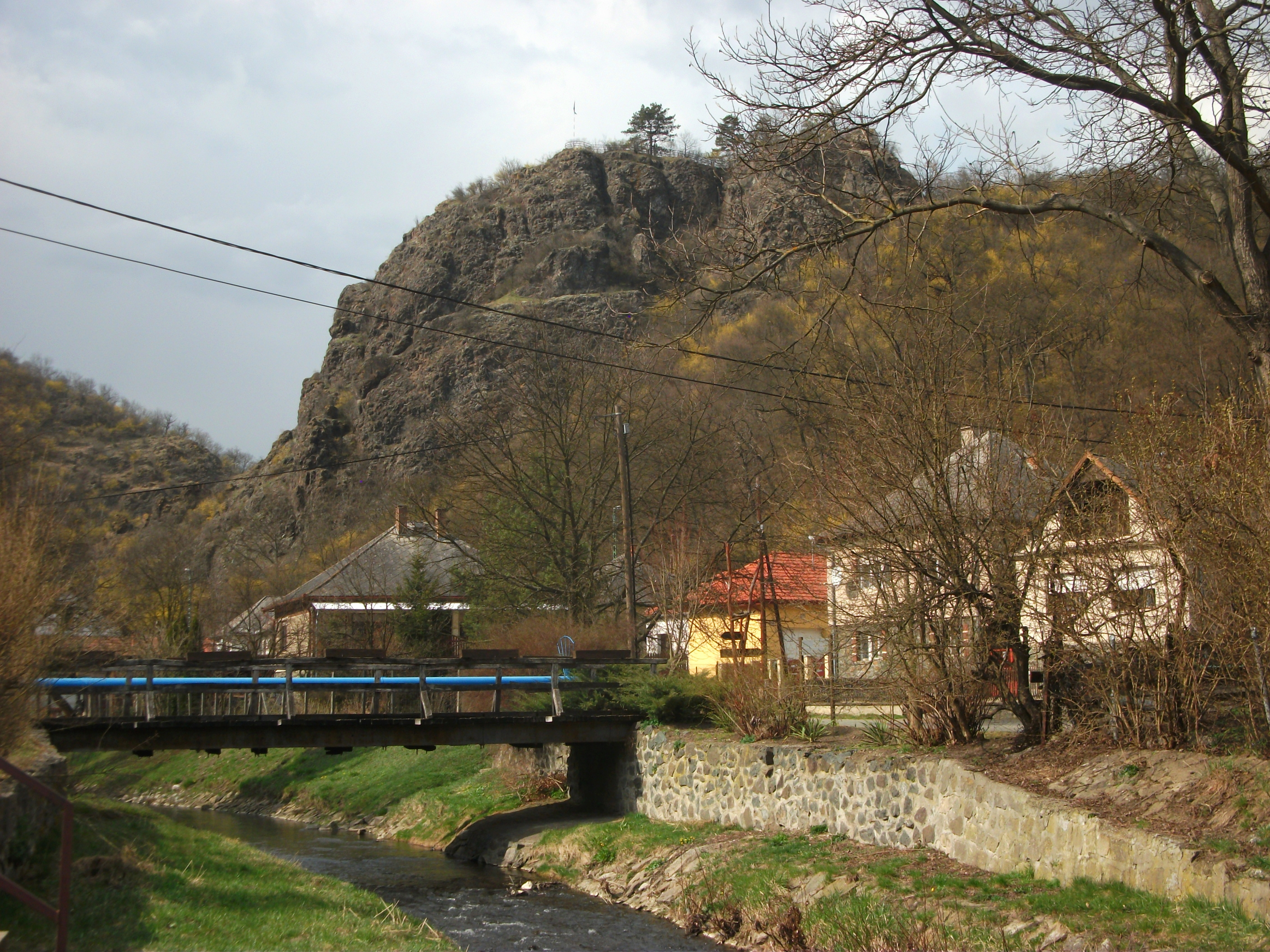
The hill with the Szarvaskő castle ruin

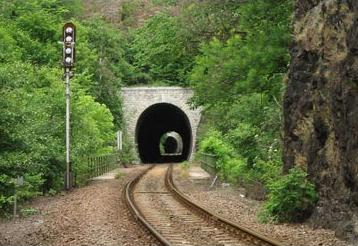

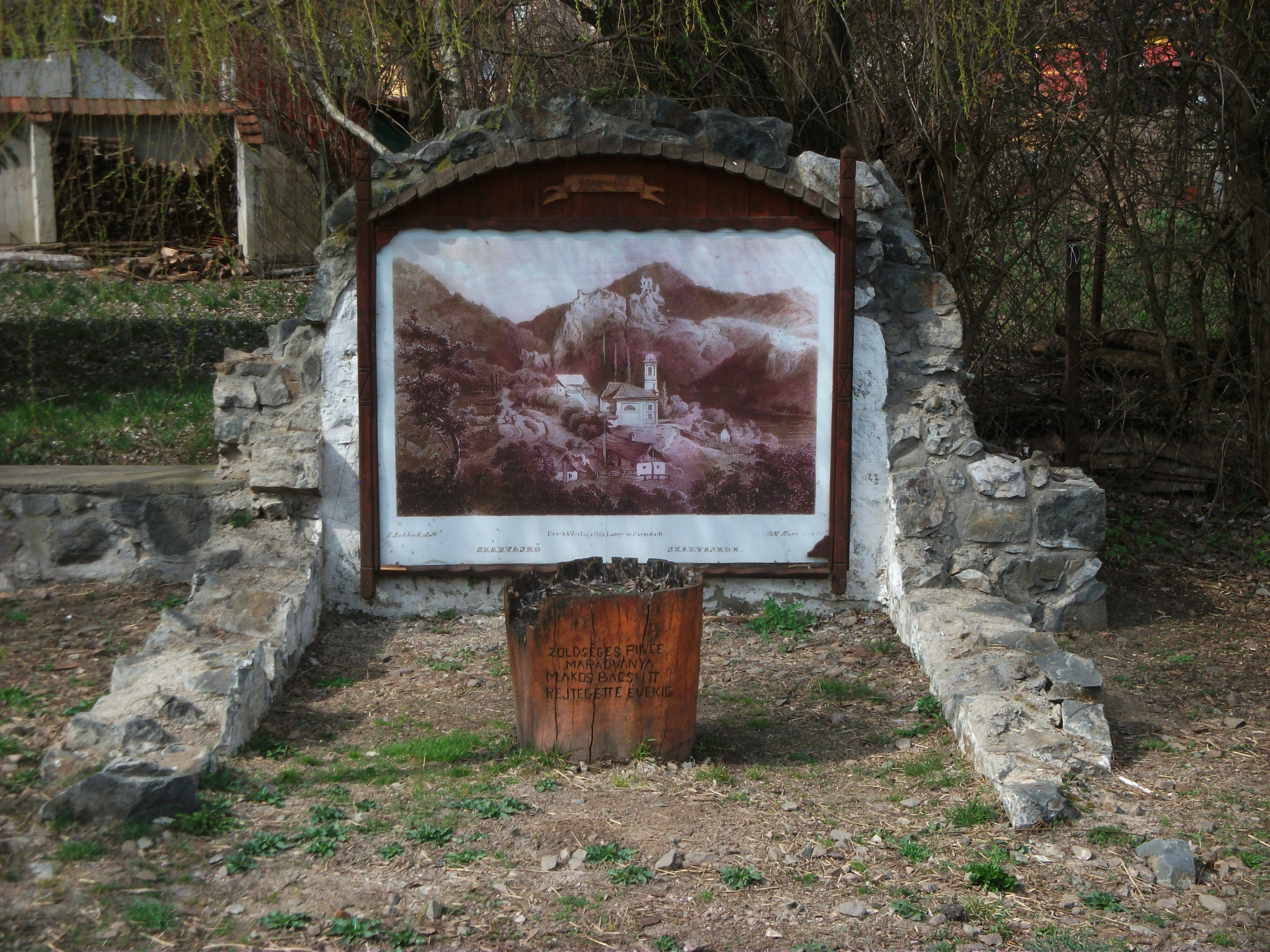

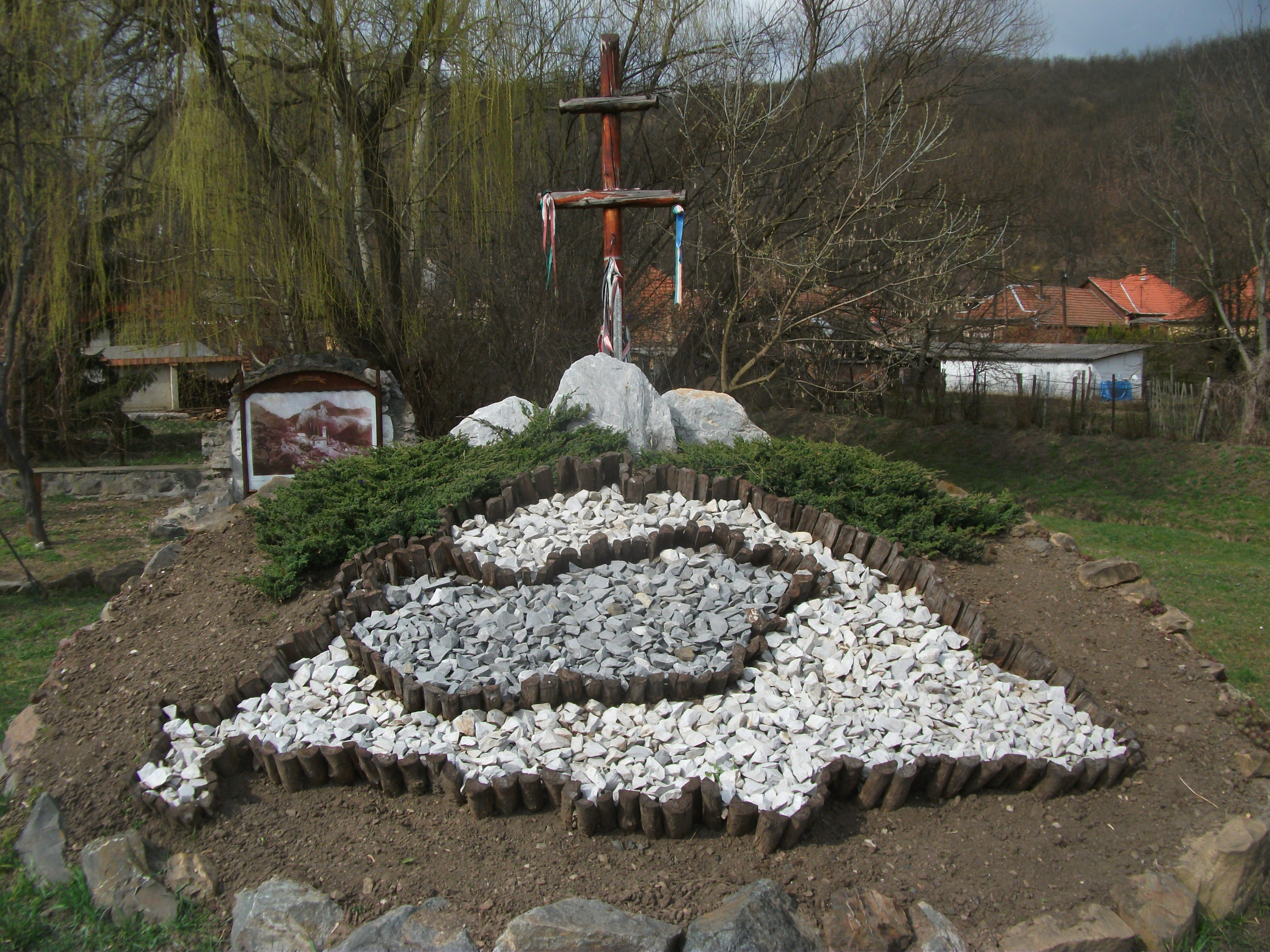

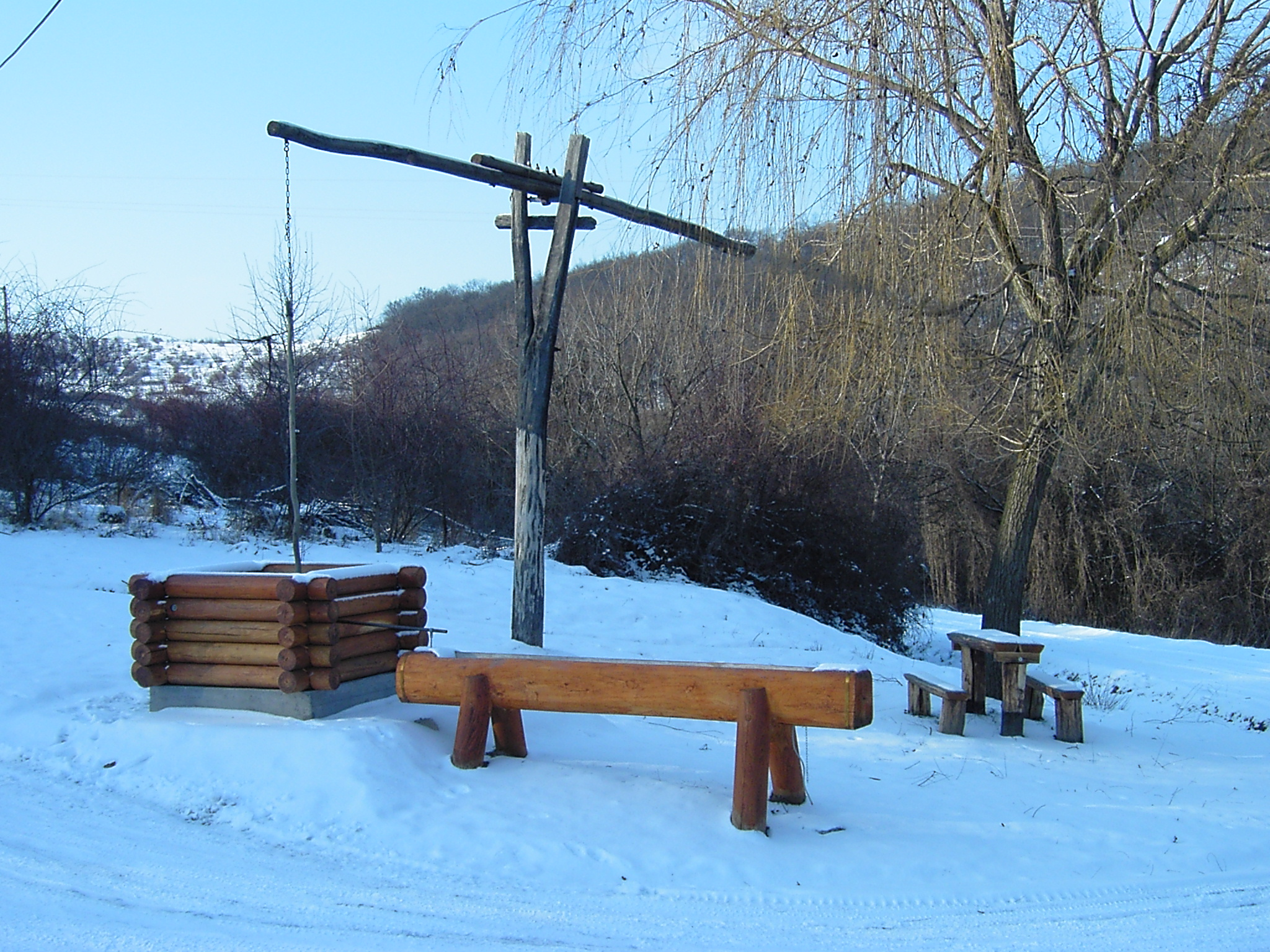

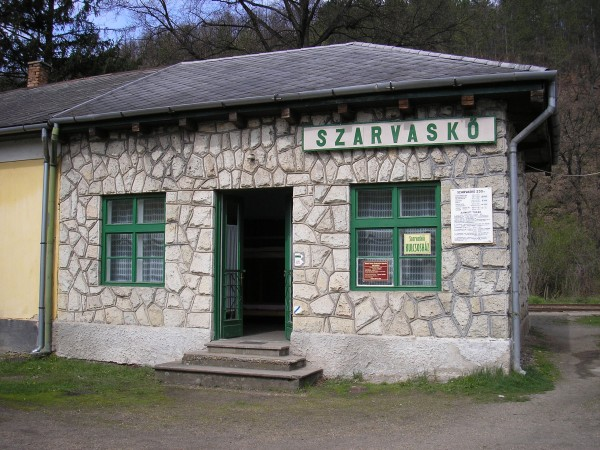

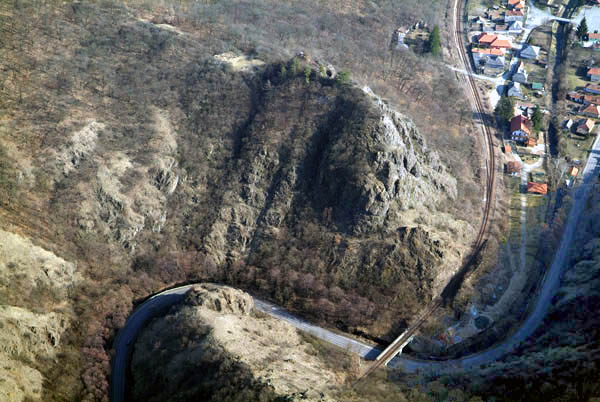
