= Ladislaus Szilágyi =

- Captain of the fortress of Bradics
- Noble family: House of Szilágyi
- Spouse: Katalin Bellyéni
- Issue: Michael Szilágyi, Regent of the Kingdom of Hungary; Osvát Szilágyi; Erzsébet Szilágyi; Zsófia Szilágyi; László Szilágyi; Orsolya Szilágyi
- Father: Miklós Szilágyi de Alsó-Baksán et Nagy-Dobán

Ladislaus Szilágyi (Hungarian: Szilágyi László; born at the end of the 14th century) was a Hungarian nobleman, general, captain of the fortress of Bradics,

== Sources ==
- Fraknói Vilmos: Michael Szilágyi, The uncle of King Matthias (Bp., 1913)
- W.Vityi Zoltán: King Matthias maternal relatives
- Felsőmagyarországi Minerva: nemzeti folyó-irás, Volumul 6

Ladislaus Szilágyi House of Szilágyi
Political offices
New title	captain of the fortress of Bradics	Vacant
