= Szilágyi family =

Hungarian noble family

Szilágyi
- Country: Kingdom of Hungary
- Titles: Perpetual Count of Beszterce (perpetuus et liber comes districtus Bistriciensis)

The Szilágyi of Horogszeg (Hungarian: horogszegi Szilágyi) was an old and important medieval Hungarian noble family, whose members occupied many significant political and military positions in the Kingdom of Hungary and Transylvania.

== History ==
The Szilágyi family traces its origin from the region of the Szilágy-patak (present-day Sălaj River, part of Romania). The family intermarried with other important houses of the region, such as House of Basarab, House of Hunyadi, House of Rozgonyi etc.

Most specialists agree that the family died out in the Middle Ages. According to the Hungarian medieval scholar and author Zoltán W. Vityi, the noble Szilágyi de Horogszeg family who lived in Nyírgelse and Nyírmihálydi (in Szabolcs County in Hungary) in the 1930s were descendants of this medieval noble family.

== Gallery ==
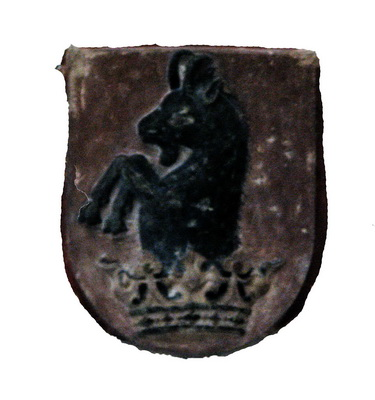
Szilágyi Coat of Arms

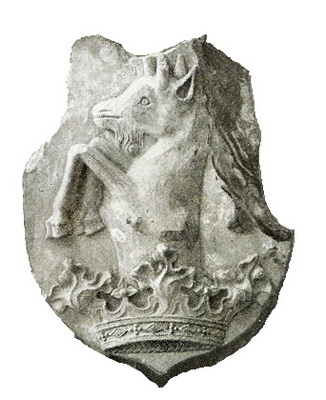
Szilágyi Coat of Arms

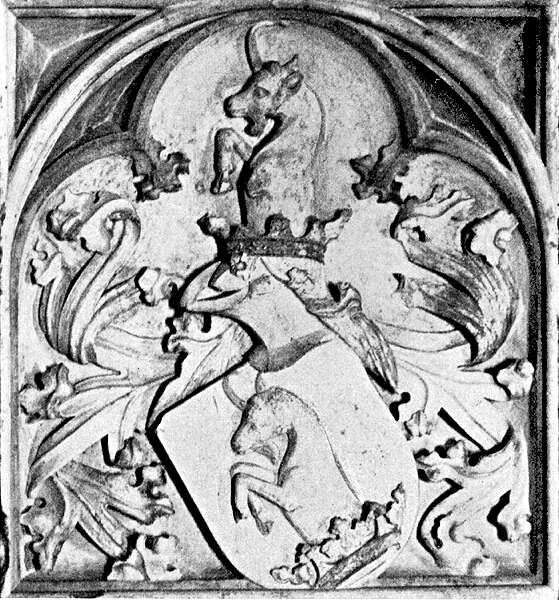
Coat of Arms of Szilágyi Family

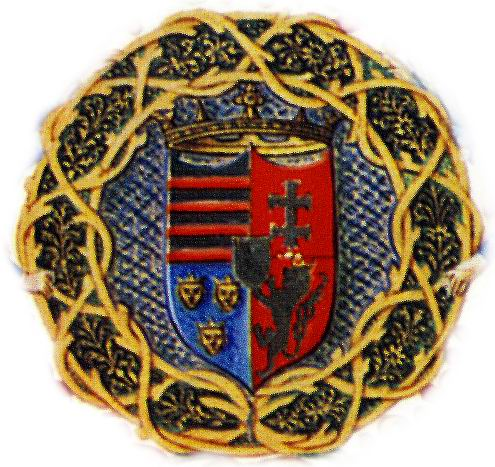
Coat of arms of Michael Szilágyi as Regent of Hungary

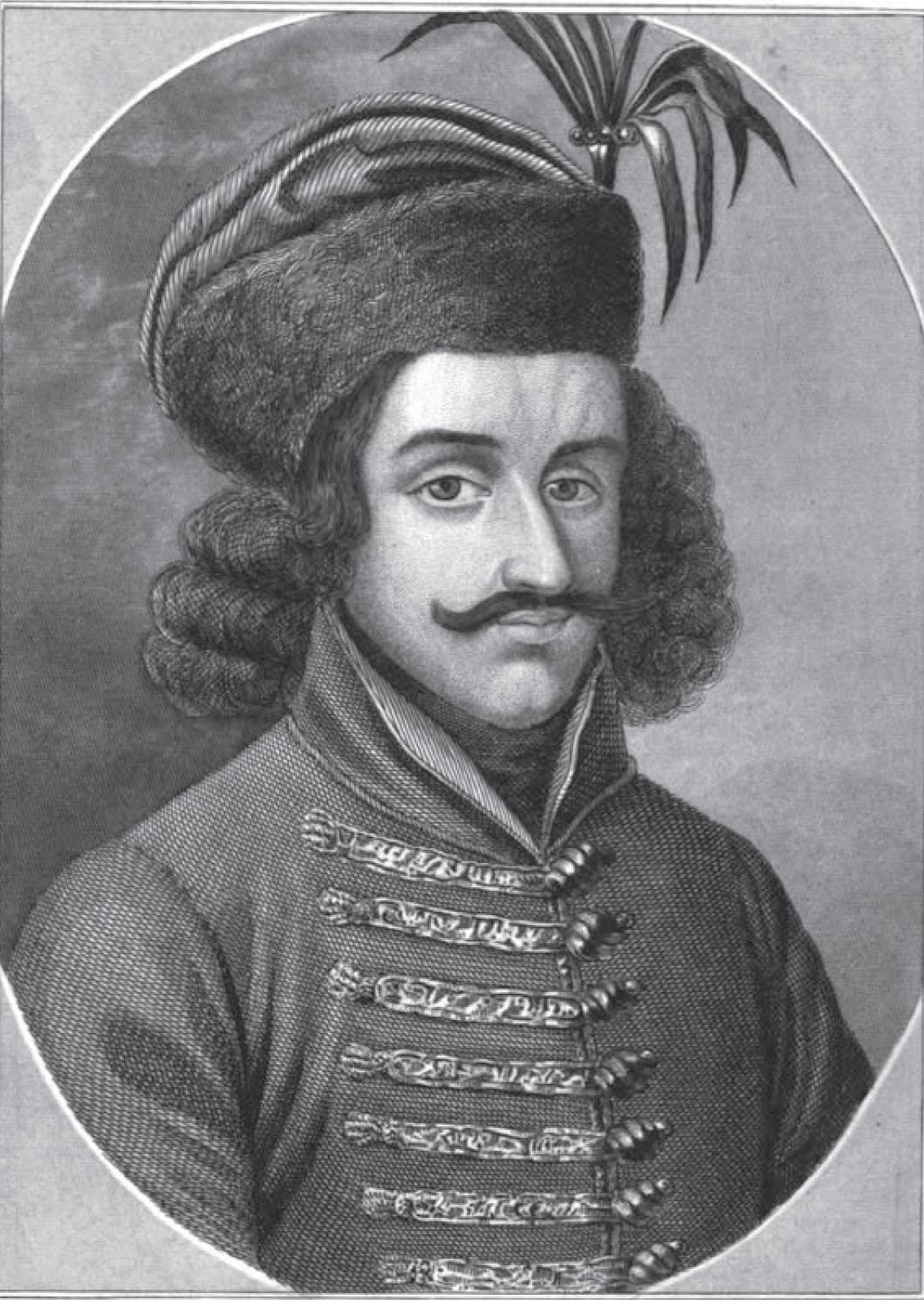
Michael Szilágyi, Regent of Hungary, Voivode of Transylvania

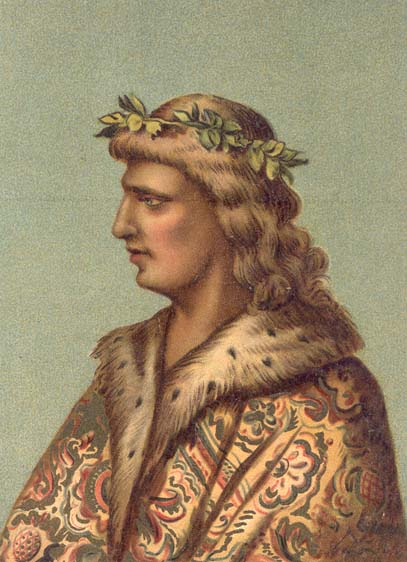
Matthias Corvinus, King of Hungary and Croatia, King of Bohemia, Duke of Austria, son of

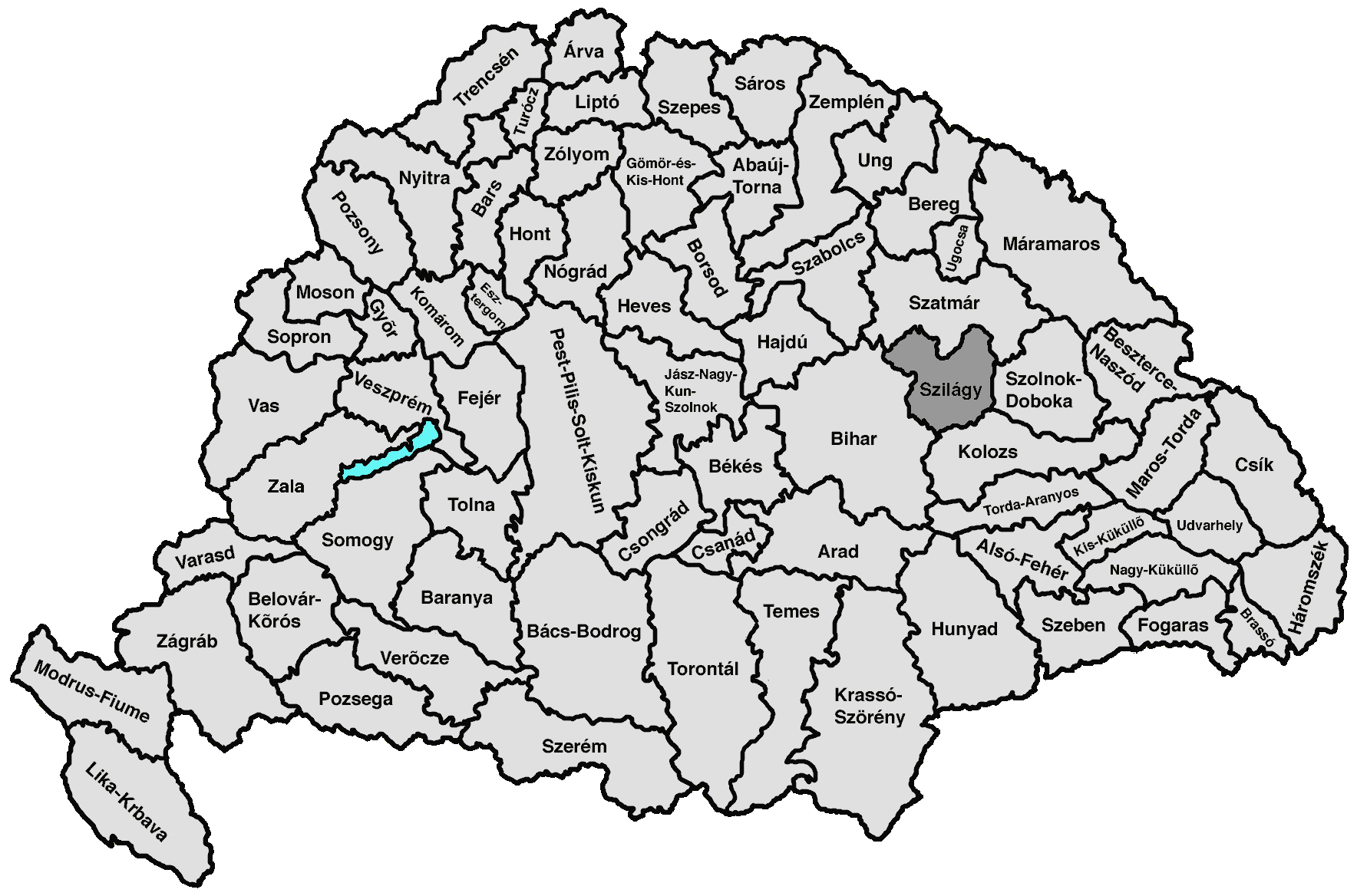
A 19th-century map of Kingdom of Hungary showing the location of Szilágy County

Present-day location of Sălaj County on the map of Romania

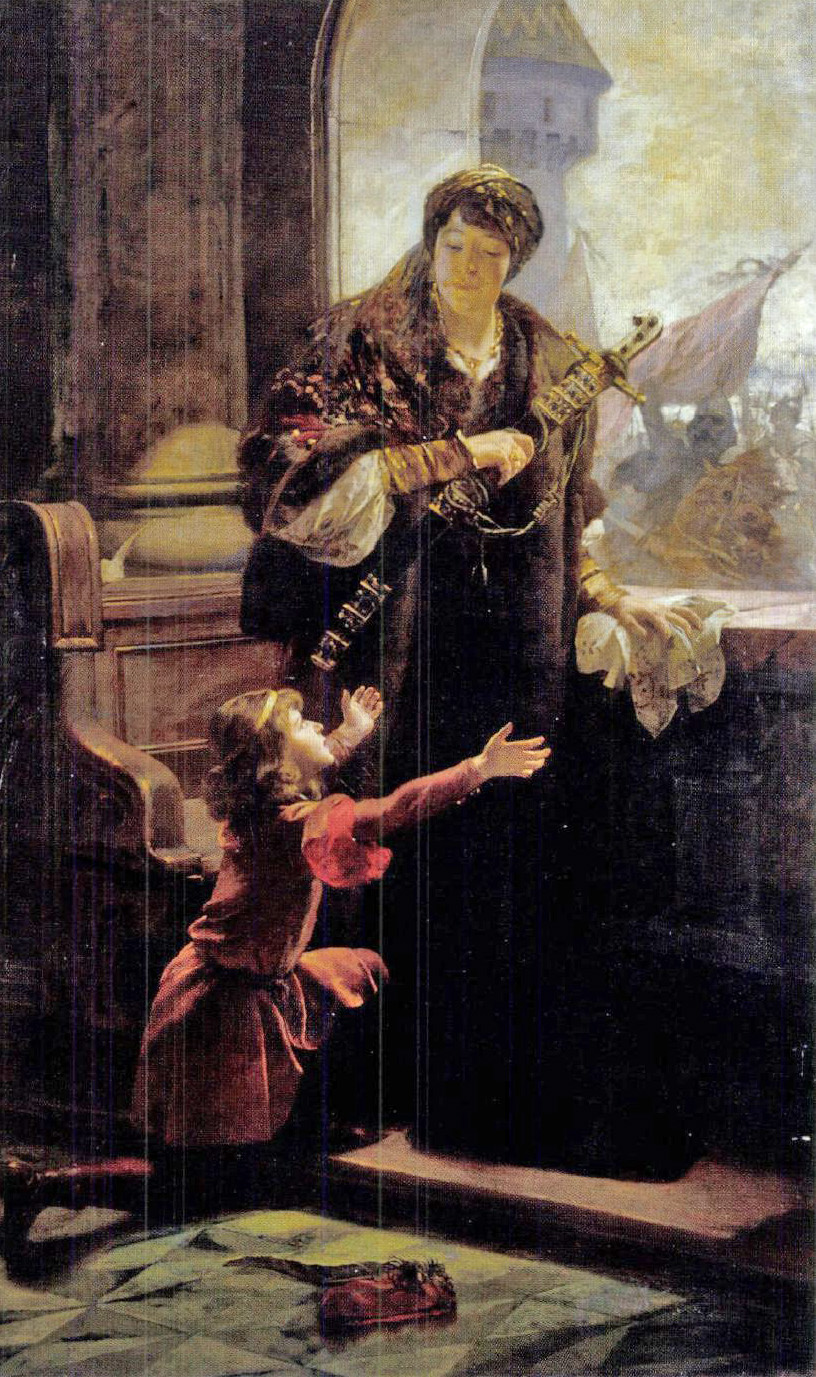
Erzsébet Szilágyi with her son Matthias

== Notable members ==
- Ladislaus Szilágyi (15th century) of Horogszeg, captain of the fortress of Bradics
- Michael Szilágyi (1400–1460), Regent of the Kingdom of Hungary, Voivode of Transylvania, Ban of Macsó
- Jusztina Szilágyi, Second consort Vlad Tepes III
- Erzsébet Szilágyi, Queen Mother of Hungary, mother of king Matthias Corvinus
- Orsolya Szilágyi, wife of John Rozgonyi, voivode of Transylvania, Judge Royal of the Kingdom of Hungary
- Zsófia Szilágyi, wife of John Geréb de Vingárt, vice-voivode of Transylvania
- Margit (Erzsébet) Szilágyi, wife of Máté (Mátyus) Maróti, Ban de Macsó, Ispán of Bács, Baranya, Bodrog, Syrmia, Tolna and Valkó Counties
- Gergely Szilágyi, Lord of the Castle of Szarvaskő

== See also ==
- Szilágyi – Hunyadi Liga
- List of titled noble families in the Kingdom of Hungary

== Sources ==
- Bokor József (szerk.). A Pallas nagy lexikona. Arcanum: FolioNET Kft. ISBN 963 85923 2 X, 1998
- Radu R. Florescu, Raymond T. McNally, Dracula: Prince of many faces - His life and his times, p. 130
- Kisfaludy Károly: Szilágyi Mihály szabadulása (színmű, Pest, 1822)
- Fraknói Vilmos: Michael Szilágyi, The uncle of King Matthias (Bp., 1913)
