= List of people who disappeared mysteriously (pre-1910) =

This is a list of people who disappeared mysteriously prior to 1910, or people whose deaths or the exact circumstances thereof are not substantiated. Many people who disappear end up declared dead in absentia, and some of these people were possibly subjected to forced disappearance.

This list is a general catch-all; for specialty lists, see lists of people who disappeared.

== Before 1800 ==
Date	Person(s)	Age	Missing from	Circumstances	Refs.
c. 1324 BC	Zannanza (prince of Hittite Empire)	Unknown	En route to ancient Egypt from Hittite Empire	Zannanza was sent by his father, Hittite king Šuppiluliuma I to wed Egyptian queen Ankhesenamun but never arrived in Egypt and never returned to the Hittites. Ancient Egyptian officials reported no knowledge of Zannanza's whereabouts while Šuppiluliuma I accused them of foul play. Circumstances escalated into conflict.	
524 BC	Lost Army of Cambyses	Various	Western Desert of Egypt	A legendary army of 50,000 men sent by Cambyses II into the Siwa Oasis in Egypt. According to Herodotus, they had gone halfway across the desert when supposedly a giant sandstorm buried them all as they were never seen again.	
Late 4th century BC	Laozi (Laozi is a legendary character and not all information about him is necessarily historical)	Unknown	Didao, State of Qin, China	The Ancient Chinese philosopher and writer who reportedly wrote the Tao Te Ching and founded Taoism, is thought to have disappeared sometime in the late 4th century BC and was never seen again.	
30 BC	Alexander Helios	10	Egypt	Helios and Philadelphus, sons of Cleopatra and Mark Antony and the younger half-brothers of Caesarion, left Egypt for Rome, after which their fates are unknown.	
30 BC	Ptolemy Philadelphus	6	Egypt	Helios and Philadelphus, sons of Cleopatra and Mark Antony and the younger half-brothers of Caesarion, left Egypt for Rome, after which their fates are unknown.	
c. 106	Robustus; Metilius Crispus	Unknown	Roman Empire	Two separate incidents of notables vanishing without a trace. Pliny the Younger notes that Robustus, an equites, was last seen in the town of Ocriculum. Metilius Crispus, for whom Pliny had achieved a commission as centurion and gave him 40,000 sesterces, vanished after leaving their home town of Novus Comum. Pliny wonders if each had been murdered by highwaymen with their slaves – or by their own slaves.	
108–164	Legio IX Hispana ("9th Spanish Legion")	Various	Roman Empire	The Roman legion stationed in Roman Britain, following the Roman conquest of Britain in 43 AD, disappears from surviving records without explanation in the second century. There are multiple conjectures regarding what happened to it and why no record of its fate has been found. Many references to the legion have been made in subsequent works of fiction.	
August 683	Saf ibn Sayyad	Unknown	Northern outskirts of Medina, Umayyad Caliphate (modern-day Saudi Arabia)	Saf ibn Sayyad, an alleged claimant of prophethood during the time of Islamic prophet Muhammad, reportedly disappeared during the Battle of al-Harra and was never seen again.	
774	Vijayaditya II	Unknown	Vātāpi	Vijayaditya II, son of Kirtivarman II, was crown prince of the Badami Chalukya dynasty until its destruction in 753 by the Rashtrakutas. He narrowly escaped a grim fate at Vātāpi (now Badami) by fleeing south with his wife to Ganga territory, where he lived for many years by the grace of the Ganga king Sripurusha. He departed on a journey north in 774, after which his whereabouts are unknown.	
874	Muhammad al-Mahdi	6	Samarra, Iraq	The Twelfth Shia Imam, went missing as a child to escape persecution from the Abbasid Caliphate.	
13 February 1021	Al-Hakim bi-Amr Allah	36	Cairo, Egypt	The sixth Fatimid caliph and 16th Ismaili imam rode his donkey to the Mokattam hills for one of his regular nocturnal meditation outings and failed to return. A search found only the donkey and his bloodstained garments.	
27 September 1177	Master Philip	Unknown	Middle East	Pope Alexander III sent his personal physician, Master Philip, to find and establish diplomatic contact with the mythical priest-king from the East, Prester John. The route that Philip took is a mystery. He was never heard from again.	
c. 1182	Renier of Montferrat	20–21	Italy	A Lombard noble of the House of Montferrat, brother of the famous Conrad (king-consort of Jerusalem) and Boniface (crusader king of Thessalonica), and son-in-law to Byzantine Emperor Manuel Komnenos, was assumed poisoned along with his wife during a coup and the subsequent power struggle in Constantinople. Chroniclers describe his wife's death, but not his.	
April 1203	Arthur I, Duke of Brittany	15–16	Rouen, France	The 4th Earl of Richmond and Duke of Brittany between 1196 and 1203, Arthur was captured by his uncle King John's barons on 1 August 1202, and imprisoned in the Château de Falaise in Falaise, Normandy. While there, John ordered him to be castrated, but Arthur's guard Hubert de Burgh could not bring himself to let this happen, so he leaked news that Arthur had died of natural causes, which Brittany did not believe as they suspected he had been murdered. Arthur disappeared in April 1203 after being transferred to Rouen Castle. Several stories existed about his fate, but he is generally believed to have been murdered by John.	
1398	Gearóid Iarla	62–63	Kingdom of Desmond, Ireland	Gerald FitzMaurice FitzGerald, also known by the Irish-language Gearóid Iarla (Earl Gerald), was the 3rd Earl of Desmond, lord of Munster, and Norman-Gaelic poet; he disappeared in 1398.	
13 July 1402	Jianwen Emperor (Zhu Yunwen)	25	China	Went missing following the Jingnan rebellion, a civil war in the early years of the Ming dynasty of China between him and his uncle Zhu Di, the Prince of Yan. The campaign ended after the forces of the Prince of Yan captured the imperial capital Nanjing, with Yunwen and his family disappearing, presumably dying in the fire.	
13 July 1402	Zhu Wenkui	6	China	Went missing following the Jingnan rebellion, a civil war in the early years of the Ming dynasty of China between him and his uncle Zhu Di, the Prince of Yan. The campaign ended after the forces of the Prince of Yan captured the imperial capital Nanjing, with Yunwen and his family disappearing, presumably dying in the fire.	
1412	Owain Glyndŵr	~58	Wales	The last native Welsh person to hold the title Prince of Wales, Glyndŵr instigated the Welsh Revolt against the rule of Henry IV of England in 1400. Although initially successful, the uprising was eventually defeated, but Glyndŵr disappeared and it is unknown what became of him after that.	
1444	Ladislaus Jagiellon	20	Varna, modern day Bulgaria	King of Poland, Hungary and Croatia, as well as Grand Duke of Lithuania. He disappeared during the Battle of Varna, with Turkish sources giving conflicting reports of his death, and numerous claims of his possible survival.	
29 May 1453	Constantine XI Palaiologos	48	Constantinople	The last Byzantine emperor during the final hours of the Siege of Constantinople, Constantine XI Palaiologos disappeared during the fighting and most likely died.	
January 1463	François Villon	~32	Paris, France	The fate of the French poet and criminal after January 1463 remains unknown. A Paris court banished him from the town on 5 January 1463; after this no certain facts about him and his life and whereabouts exist.	
Mid-1483	Edward V, King of England	12	London, England	The Princes in the Tower, Edward V of England and Richard of Shrewsbury, sons of King Edward IV and Elizabeth Woodville, were placed in the Tower of London (which at that time served as a fortress and a royal palace as well as a prison) by their uncle Richard III of England. Neither was ever seen in public again and their fate remains unknown. The remains of four children that have been found could be the princes, but they have not been subjected to DNA analysis to positively identify them.	
Mid-1483	Richard of Shrewsbury, 1st Duke of York	9	London, England	The Princes in the Tower, Edward V of England and Richard of Shrewsbury, sons of King Edward IV and Elizabeth Woodville, were placed in the Tower of London (which at that time served as a fortress and a royal palace as well as a prison) by their uncle Richard III of England. Neither was ever seen in public again and their fate remains unknown. The remains of four children that have been found could be the princes, but they have not been subjected to DNA analysis to positively identify them.	
June 1487	Francis Lovell, 1st Viscount Lovell	30–31	Oxfordshire, England	Lovell, a rebel Yorkist knight, was last seen alive fleeing from the Battle of Stoke Field after defeat by the Lancastrians. In 1488 he was granted safe conduct in Scotland by King James IV but there is no evidence he was ever in the country. (A skeleton found at one of his mansions at Minster Lovell, Oxfordshire, in 1708 was believed, without evidence, to be his.)	
29 August 1526	George Zápolya	37–38	Mohács, Hungary	Brother of John Zapolya, George was relegated to the political life besides his brother. He was engaged to Elisabeth Corvinus, daughter of John Corvinus, in 1504, but the last surviving member of the Hunyadi family died in 1508. He was commander of the Hungarian Royal Army, along with Archbishop of Kalocsa Pál Tomori, at the Battle of Mohács, where he disappeared and presumably died. Court chaplain Miklós Tatai believed that Zápolya murdered King Louis II of Hungary, who escaped from the battle, in the house of the vicar in Dunaszekcső. Historians do not accept this report as credible.	
c. 1577	Mansur Shah I of Perak	Unknown	Kuala Kangsar, Perak	The second Sultan of Perak from 1549 to 1577, he mysteriously disappeared during his Friday prayers Iʿtikāf in Kota Lama Kanan Mosque, and presumed dead by the local populace. Later posthumously titled as "Marhum Kota Lama Kanan". A monumental tombstone was erected inside the mosque prayer hall under the orders of Idris Murshidul Azzam Shah of Perak.	
4 August 1578	Sebastian, King of Portugal	24	Ksar el-Kebir, Morocco	The King of Portugal from 1557 to 1578 and an example of the king asleep in mountain legend, Sebastian was likely killed during the Battle of Alcácer Quibir, but his body was never identified.	
c. 1590	Roanoke colonists	Various	Roanoke Colony, North Carolina, U.S.	The Roanoke colonists, including Ananias, age 27–30; Eleanor, age 19; and Virginia Dare, age 2 or 3, the first English child born in a New World English overseas possession, disappeared becoming known as the Lost Colony. On 18 August 1590, their settlement was found abandoned. The settlement was located on Roanoke Island, currently part of Dare County, North Carolina. A carving on a tree suggests they went to the local Croatoan Island, but this was never confirmed.	
1628	David Thompson	39–40	Boston, Massachusetts, U.S.	The founder of the New Hampshire colony in 1623, Thompson moved his family to an island in Boston Harbor (today called Thompson Island in his honor) in 1626 becoming the first European settlers of Boston, Massachusetts. He disappeared in 1628. Some historians theorize he was the victim of foul play while others suggest he accidentally drowned in Boston Harbor.	
16 November 1629	Wouter Loos	24	Kalbarri, Western Australia, Australia	Wouter Loos played a critical role in the mutiny of the Batavia, which shipwrecked off the coast of Australia in 1629 during its maiden voyage en route to Batavia (today Jakarta), capital of the Dutch East Indies (modern-day Indonesia). Started by Jeronimus Cornelisz, it is one of the bloodiest mutinies in history. After Cornelisz was captured, Loos was elected as the new leader of the mutineers. Most participants in the mutiny were captured, tried and executed; however, the trial decided that the crimes of Loos and a cabin boy named Jan Pelgrom de Bye were not serious enough to warrant their executions. They were instead marooned on mainland Australia (exact location is uncertain), given some supplies and instructed to make themselves known to the people who lived there. They were never heard from again.	
16 November 1629	Jan Pelgrom de Bye	18	Kalbarri, Western Australia, Australia		
October 1653	Erdeni Bumba	Unknown	Horchin, Mongolia	The first empress consort of the Shunzhi Emperor, disliked by her husband for various reasons (chief being Shunzhi Emperor's infatuation with his favored concubine Consort Donggo; but also due to her connection with the emperor's mother Empress Xiaozhuangwen and Dorgon, who both supported their match). In October 1653, she was demoted to Consort Jing, and left the Forbidden City. She was allegedly pregnant at the time of her departure, and that she gave birth to a son. Extant historical records are blank as to her eventual fate.	
4 July 1661?	René Ménard	56	Taylor County, Wisconsin, U.S.	A French Jesuit missionary, Fr. René Ménard, disappeared while traveling by canoe with a Native American guide from the area of present-day L'Anse, Michigan (on Lake Superior) to deep within the Wisconsin interior. The goal of the voyage was to minister to a Huron village. After encountering a series of river rapids, Ménard and his guide agreed that he would walk along the river's edge while his more-skilled companion navigated the boat downstream. His guide traversed the rapids successfully, yet Ménard was not seen at the agreed point nor ever again. Years later, his cassock and breviary were discovered in a Dakota village, far from his last known site.	
c. 1692	Abigail Williams	11–12	Salem Village, Massachusetts, U.S.	Abigail Williams was one of the first girls to make accusations of witchcraft in colonial Massachusetts, eventually leading to the start of the Salem witch trials. After her final appearance in court in 1692, Williams appears to disappear from the historical record, and her eventual whereabouts and fate remain unknown.	
24 May 1704	Laurens de Graaf	~51	Louisiana Territory, U.S.	Laurens de Graaf was last known to be near Louisiana where he was to help set up a French colony near present-day Biloxi, Mississippi. Some sources claim he died there while others claim he died at different locations in Alabama.	
1758	Khe Pandjang	Unknown	Bali, Indonesia	Pandjang was a leader of Chinese rebels fighting against the Dutch East India Company during the Java War. He escaped capture after the defeat of the rebellion, and was last seen in Bali in 1758.	
1768	Owen Parfitt	55	Shepton Mallet, Somerset, England	An Englishman whose disappearance is considered one of Britain's oldest unsolved mysteries. He vanished while seated outside his home, despite being unable to walk unaided.	
February 1792	James Harrod	50–54	Harrodsburg, Kentucky, U.S.	An early explorer of the areas west of the Appalachian Mountains prior to their settlement by European-Americans, James Harrod never returned from a trip to western Kentucky from Harrodsburg. Theories about his fate range from murder at the hands of his companions or Native Americans in the area, to accidental death or a desire to abandon his wife and family.	

== 1800 to 1899 ==
Date	Person(s)	Age	Missing from	Circumstances	Refs.
After 1802	James Derham	44–45	Pennsylvania, U.S.	Derham, the first African American to formally practice medicine in the United States, disappeared after 1802.	
25 November 1809	Benjamin Bathurst	25	Perleberg, Germany	Bathurst, a British diplomat, disappeared from an inn in Perleberg, Germany.	
c. 1813	Robert Young	16–17	Bermuda	Young, a Hawaiian chief and enlistee of the United States Navy, was captured by the British during the Battle of Lake Champlain and subsequently exiled to Bermuda, where all trace of him disappears.	
1813	Otter Woman	24–27	Near Missouri River, U.S.	Otter Woman was a Shoshone woman who disappeared near the Missouri River in 1813. Believed to have been kidnapped, she was never seen again.	
c. 1826	William Morgan	52	Batavia, New York, U.S.	Morgan disappeared just before his book critical of Freemasonry was published. A year after he had disappeared, a badly decomposed body was found that was thought to be his, but was proven not to be.	
c. 1828	Nunzio Otello Francesco Gioacchino	c. 36	Schloss Frohsdorf, Austrian Empire	A soldier and servant during the Napoleonic Wars. He later became an aide and bodyguard of Joachim Murat, and a servant to Caroline Bonaparte, serving as Caroline's personal assistant in the Schloss Frohsdorf estate after her marriage to Francesco MacDonald. His whereabouts after 1828 are unknown	
12 December 1829	John Lansing Jr.	75	New York City, New York, U.S.	Lansing, an American politician and chief justice of the New York State Supreme Court, left his Manhattan hotel to mail a letter at a New York City dock and was never seen again.	
1829	William Hare	Unknown	Dumfries, Scotland	William Hare was an Irish serial killer operating in Edinburgh, Scotland, who was given immunity from prosecution for testifying against his accomplice William Burke. After Burke was tried and hanged, Hare arrived in Dumfries, where news of his presence quickly spread, until he was taken out and instructed to make his way to the English border. There are no reliable sightings of William Hare after he was escorted out of Dumfries.	
February 1837	Joseph Gellibrand	44–45	Geelong, Victoria, Australia	The first Attorney-General of Van Diemen's Land disappeared while attempting to ride inland from Geelong, Victoria, to Melbourne in February 1837.	
December 1839	Henry Bryan	18	Burra, Australia	Bryan, who accompanied explorer Charles Sturt, Governor George Gawler, and others on an expedition from the Murray River to the Burra area of South Australia, disappeared and is believed to have died in 1839 during a dust storm on the return trip. Searchers later found his saddle and some tracks which stopped abruptly. His body was never found. However, his horse returned to Adelaide after several months.	
July 1842	Charles Christian Dutton	Unknown	Port Lincoln, Australia	Charles Christian Dutton and four other men disappeared without trace while driving cattle from Port Lincoln, South Australia to Adelaide.	
August 1843	Sequoyah	~73	San Fernando, Mexico	The creator of the Cherokee syllabary, Sequoyah disappeared during a trip to Mexico to locate isolated tribes of Cherokees who had moved there during the time of the Indian Removal in the United States. He was said to have died there in August 1843. Meanwhile, his body has never been found or positively identified, although at least three different burial sites have been reported.	
June 1844	William Overton	Unknown	Portland, Oregon, U.S.	The co-founder of the city of Portland, Oregon, Overton departed in June 1844. He may have traded his share in the infant city for supplies for his journey. Overton was never heard from again. An acquaintance claimed in 1875 that he was hanged in Texas, although records indicate Overton may have ended up in Hawaii.	
3 April 1848	Ludwig Leichhardt	34	Great Sandy Desert, Western Australia	A Prussian explorer and naturalist, Leichhardt disappeared during his third major expedition to explore parts of northern and central Australia. He was last seen on 3 April at McPherson's Station on the Darling Downs, en route from the Condamine River to the Swan River in Western Australia. Although investigated by many, his fate after leaving the settled areas remains a mystery.	
14 April 1848	Khachatur Abovian	38	Yerevan, Armenia	The Armenian writer and national public figure of the early 19th century, credited as creator of modern Armenian literature, left his house early one morning and was never heard from again.	
31 July 1849	Sándor Petőfi	26	Transylvania, Romania	Petőfi, a Hungarian poet and liberal revolutionary, was one of the key figures of the Hungarian Revolution of 1848. Petőfi was last seen in Transylvania during the Battle of Segesvár. He is thought to have been killed in battle, but since his body was never found, his true fate remains unknown.	
29 June 1856	Matías Pérez	Unknown	Cuba	Pérez, a Cuban balloonist of Portuguese descent, disappeared with his balloon Ville de Paris during a flight in Cuba on 29 June 1856.	
1857	Solomon Northup	48–49	Canada	Northup, an American author, was most notable for his book Twelve Years a Slave in which he details his kidnapping and subsequent sale into slavery. Northup did not return to his family from his book-promoting tour. No contemporary evidence documents Northup after 1857.	
1860	Giacinto Achilli	56–57	United States	An Italian Roman Catholic Dominican friar who was ousted from priesthood due to alleged child sexual abuse, but later became a prominent proponent of the Anglican Communion and for suing John Henry Newman for libel. In 1853, he travelled to America, but in 1859 found himself in court accused of adultery by a woman. He disappeared in 1860, leaving behind a note that indicated he wanted to die by suicide, and never being seen again.	
June 1860	Charles M. Waterman	~51	New Orleans, Louisiana, U.S.	The 17th mayor of New Orleans who was in office from 1856 to 1858 before being impeached and removed, disappeared two years later, possibly dying by suicide by jumping into the Mississippi River, where his hat was later found on a ferry.	
15 July 1864	Five Confederate prisoners of war	Varied	Shohola, Pennsylvania, U.S.	A train carrying Confederate prisoners of war got into an accident, and it killed 65 prisoners, guards, and train crew. During the incident, five of the prisoners escaped the train and they were never found.	
February 1865	Captain James William Boyd	42–43	Jackson, Tennessee, U.S.	Boyd, a Confederate army officer, vanished after his release as a prisoner of war in February 1865 after he failed to show up for a rendezvous with his son to go to Mexico at the end of the American Civil War. Boyd's disappearance is the subject of a conspiracy theory that he was killed after being mistaken for John Wilkes Booth, the assassin of President Abraham Lincoln.	
1866	Thomas John Hussey	73–74	Algiers, Algeria	The British clergyman and astronomer who predicted the existence of Neptune and observed Halley's Comet, was last heard from in 1866 and presumed dead in 1893.	
6 July 1869	Agoston Haraszthy	56	Corinto, Nicaragua	Haraszthy, who was a founder of the California wine industry, disappeared in a river while organizing a liquor business in Nicaragua.	
August–September 1872	John V. Creely	32	Washington, D.C., U.S.	Creely, a Civil War veteran who represented a Philadelphia district in the U.S. House of Representatives, left the city in August or September 1872 for Washington to prepare for the next session of Congress in December. At the time he was also being sued for legal malpractice and was accused of additional financial wrongdoing. Once he reached Washington, his family said, he informed them he was taking a ship to New Orleans, after which they nor anyone else heard anything more from him. His luggage and possessions were found later in the room he rented in Washington, suggesting it was unlikely that he had actually gone to New Orleans. He was declared legally dead in 1900.	
30 January–May 1874	Ramalinga Swamigal	50	Vadalur, India	A Tamil poet whose teachings of seeking pure knowledge, charity, love and the abolition of the caste system later canonized him as a Saint. On 30 January 1874, three months after delivering his final lecture on 22 October 1873, he locked himself in a room and instructed his followers not to open it. Four months later, in May, the government forced it open, only to find nobody present.	
23 April 1874	Alfred Gibson	22–23	Western Australia, Australia	Gibson, an Australian explorer who accompanied Ernest Giles on his expedition to explore to cross the deserts from east to west, went on his own to fetch some water, but never returned and was presumed dead by his companions.	
1 July 1874	Charley Ross	4	Philadelphia, Pennsylvania, U.S.	Ross, a resident of Philadelphia, was enticed along with his brother Walter into a horse-drawn carriage while playing in their front yard on 1 July. Walter got out at a fireworks shop, and the carriage drove on without him. The family received ransom notes and worked with police, but all to no avail.	
c. 1878	Archibald S. Dobbins	~51	Patagonia, Argentina	Dobbins, a senior Confederate cavalry officer who had served with distinction in the Trans-Mississippi Theater of the American Civil War before immigrating to Brazil in 1867 and then to Argentina in 1878 to pursue business interests, was last mentioned in 1878. Theories about his fate range from murder at the hands of Native Americans near the Pará region of Brazil, a natural death in the Patagonia region of Argentina, to a desire to abandon his wife and family.	
28 September 1879	John Wise	71	Lake Michigan, U.S.	Wise was a pioneer in the field of ballooning, responsible for several innovations in the design and for making over 400 flights during his lifetime. In 1879, while aboard his balloon The Pathfinder along with passenger George Burr, he disappeared over Lake Michigan, never to be seen again. Burr's body was later located washed ashore, and it is assumed that Wise suffered the same fate.	
1880s	William Cantelo	41–50	Southampton, England	Cantelo, inventor of an early machine gun, never returned to his Southampton home after one of his frequent and lengthy sales trips. His sons speculated years later that he had re-emerged as Hiram Maxim, another machine-gun pioneer, whom he strongly resembled.	
1882	Jesse Evans	29	Huntsville, Texas, U.S.	An American outlaw, gunman of the Old West, leader of the Jesse Evans Gang, and veteran of the Lincoln County War, Evans disappeared shortly after his release from prison in 1882. Despite an unsubstantiated claimant in 1948 (who also claimed that other Lincoln County veterans, including the renowned Billy the Kid, were still alive), Evans' fate remains unknown.	
After 28 February 1888	Charles "Black Bart" Boles	58–59	Marysville, California, U.S.	An American outlaw noted for the poetic messages he left behind after two of his robberies, Boles disappeared after his release from prison on 28 February 1888 and was not seen again.	
30 October 1888	Henry Boynton Clitz	64	Niagara Falls, New York, U.S.	Clitz, a career U.S. Army officer who had served with distinction in the Mexican and Civil wars before being named commandant of the United States Corps of Cadets at West Point, was last seen on 30 October. Family members said his mental state had been deteriorating over the previous months; he was presumed to have drowned although no body was ever found.	
16 September 1890	Louis Le Prince	48	Dijon, France	Le Prince, a motion picture pioneer credited as the inventor of the medium, disappeared after boarding a Paris-bound train at Dijon, France.	
24 May 1893	Allan McDonald	Unknown	Melbourne, Australia	McDonald, a former New Zealand politician, was last seen at a hotel in Melbourne.	
May 1894	Frank Lenz	25	Erzurum, Turkey	Lenz was an American bicyclist and adventurer who disappeared somewhere near Erzurum, Turkey (then part of the Ottoman Empire) in May 1894, during an attempt to circle the globe by bicycle.	
25 March 1895	Jeremiah Haralson	48	Albany, New York, U.S.	A Reconstruction-era congressman from Alabama, Haralson was convicted on charges of pension fraud in Arkansas in December 1894. He was incarcerated at the Albany County Penitentiary the following March, and vanishes from the historical record afterward.	
1 February 1896	Albert Jennings Fountain	57	Las Cruces, New Mexico, U.S.	Former Texas state senator and lieutenant governor Albert Jennings Fountain disappeared near Las Cruces, New Mexico, United States, along with his son Henry on 1 February 1896. Evidence found along their route strongly suggests they were murdered, but no bodies were ever found.	
1 February 1896	Henry Fountain	8	Las Cruces, New Mexico, U.S.	Former Texas state senator and lieutenant governor Albert Jennings Fountain disappeared near Las Cruces, New Mexico, United States, along with his son Henry on 1 February 1896. Evidence found along their route strongly suggests they were murdered, but no bodies were ever found.	
6 August 1896	Frank H. Howard	~56	Los Angeles, California, U.S.	Howard, an attorney and member of the Los Angeles Unified School District known for representing a librarian suing a Methodist minister for slander, was last seen waiting for a streetcar to go on a trip to San Bernardino on 6 August 1896.	
21 July 1898	Marguerite Long	63	Lyon, France	Marguerite Long is believed to be a victim of serial killer Luigi Richetto. Long was a 63-year-old widow who disappeared on 21 July 1898. Several items known to belong to her were discovered following Richetto's arrest.	

== 1900s ==
Date	Person(s)	Age	Missing from	Circumstances	Refs.
26 December 1900	Thomas Marshall	24	Flannan Isles Lighthouse, Scotland	Lighthouse keepers at the Flannan Isles Lighthouse who mysteriously vanished from their posts.	
26 December 1900	James Ducat	48	Flannan Isles Lighthouse, Scotland	Lighthouse keepers at the Flannan Isles Lighthouse who mysteriously vanished from their posts.	
26 December 1900	Donald McArthur	Unknown	Flannan Isles Lighthouse, Scotland	Lighthouse keepers at the Flannan Isles Lighthouse who mysteriously vanished from their posts.	
1902	John Urbanski	Unknown	Long Prairie, Minnesota	John Urbanski was a suspected victim of serial killer Eugene Butler.	
1902	Yda Hillis Addis	44–45	California, U.S.	A translator of ancient Mexican narratives, Addis escaped from an insane asylum in California where her husband had her confined during their divorce and was not seen again.	
27 August 1903	Michael Moffatt	28	New York, U.S.	Moffatt, from the townland of Barnamaghery, County Down, Ireland, left home to visit his brother Robert in Pittsburgh, Pennsylvania, but never arrived. The last known record of him was an immigration record showing his arrival in America.	
c. 1908	Joseph "Bunko" Kelly	Unknown	Salem, Oregon, U.S.	The English hotelier, crimper and convicted murderer who had just completed a 13-year prison sentence at the Oregon State Penitentiary, and afterward wrote a book about the conditions there, left Salem on a trip to California after his book was published, and never returned.	
17 October 1908	Eduardo Newbery	30	Río de la Plata, Argentina	Argentine odontologist and aerostat pilot Eduardo Newbery and Argentine Army Corporal Eduardo Romero disappeared after taking off for Buenos Aires in the aerostat Pampero in an attempt to achieve a night-flying record.	
17 October 1908	Eduardo Romero	33–38?	Río de la Plata, Argentina	Argentine odontologist and aerostat pilot Eduardo Newbery and Argentine Army Corporal Eduardo Romero disappeared after taking off for Buenos Aires in the aerostat Pampero in an attempt to achieve a night-flying record.	

== See also ==
- List of people who disappeared mysteriously (1910–1970)
- List of people who disappeared mysteriously (2000–present)
- Forced disappearance
- List of fugitives from justice who disappeared
- List of kidnappings
- List of murder convictions without a body
- List of people who disappeared mysteriously at sea
- Lists of solved missing person cases
- List of unsolved deaths
