= Hungarian–Ottoman War (1521–1526) =

1521–1526 war

- Part of Ottoman–Hungarian wars
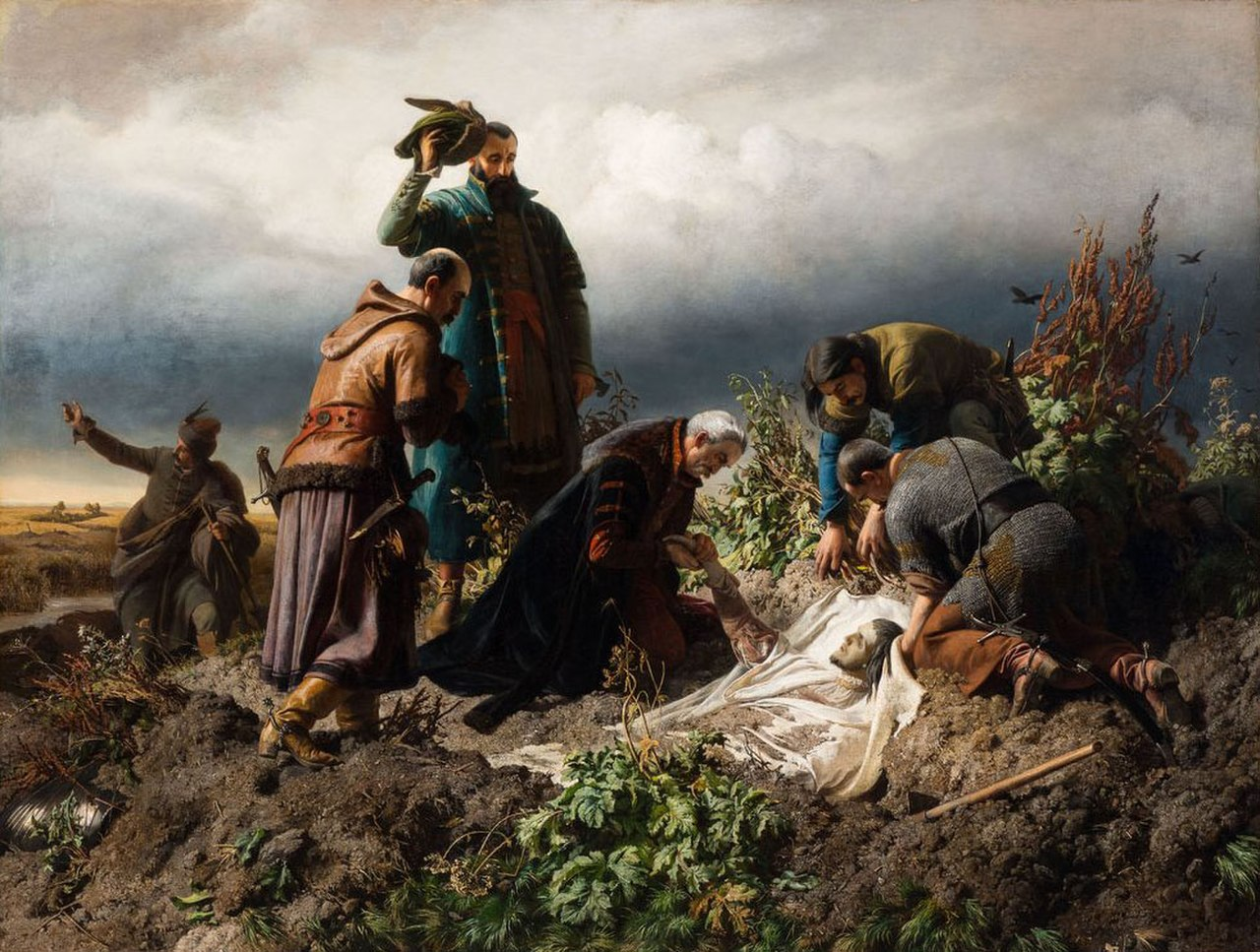
- Discovering the Body of King Louis II (painting by Bertalan Székely, 1860)
Date	1521–1526
Location	Kingdom of Hungary
Result	Ottoman victory
Territorial changes	A part of the South Region, Nándorfehérvár, Petrovaradin and several southern strongholds with castles in Croatia, and almost all of Bosnian together with Hungarian possessions falls into Turkish hands

Belligerents
Ottoman Empire	Kingdom of Hungary; Kingdom of Croatia; Serbian Despotate; Crown of Bohemia; Holy Roman Empire; Duchy of Bavaria; Papal States; Kingdom of Poland; Hungarian Slovenes

Commanders and leaders
Suleiman I Pargalı Ibrahim Pasha; Malkoçoğlu Bali Bey; Gazi Hüsrev Bey	Louis II of Hungary †; Pál Tomori †; György Zápolya †; Stephen VII Báthory; Pavle Bakić; Radič Božić

Strength
1526: 50,000–100,000	1526: 25,000–40,000

Casualties and losses
1526: 1,500–2,000	1526: 24,000 (Note: Feridun Emecen,"Battle of Mohacs". "According to the rûznâme kept during the battle, the Hungarian dead who remained in the square were not left in the middle and were buried, while the bodies of 20,000 infantry and 4,000 cavalry were counted." (in Turkish))

The Ottoman–Hungarian War of 1521–1526 – an armed conflict between the Ottoman Empire and the Kingdom of Hungary, which effectively ended the independence of the Kingdom of Hungary and began the period of Ottoman conquest of the Middle Danube.

== Background ==
The Ottoman–Hungarian wars began after the Turkish conquest of Western Bulgaria in 1396. Military operations took place mainly on the territory of Bulgaria, Serbia, Bosnia and the Danube principalities. In 1456, a crusader army under John Hunyadi defeated near Belgrade an army under Mehmed II. This victory stopped the Turkish advance deep into Hungarian territory for another 70 years, but could not prevent the fall of Serbia (1459), Bosnia (1463) and Herzegovina (1481). As a result, the Turks reached the border of Hungarian Croatia, and already during the campaigns of 1480–1481 they made major raids into Croatia, Slavonia, Hungarian counties Zala, Austrian Krayna and Styria, and also penetrated into Northern Italy (Friul).

Subsequent military operations took place in Bosnia, Croatia, Slavonia, the Belgrade area and Transylvania. Busy with the conquest of Eastern Anatolia, wars with Aq Qoyunlu and Mamluks, the Ottoman Empire reduced pressure on the Hungarian borders, and in 1503 concluded with the king Vladislav Danube Peace for 7 years. It was renewed in 1510, 1513, and after the war of 1517–1518 a three-year truce was signed. At the same time, peace treaties did not stop the undeclared war: Ottoman raids, sieges of cities and retaliatory strikes of the Hungarians.

The military potential of Hungary at the end of the 15th – beginning of the 16th centuries decreased significantly compared to the times of Matthias Corvinus. The kings of the Jagiellonian dynasty were forced to give up the prerogatives of the central government in favor of the magnates. In 1492 the standing mercenary army was disbanded. An attempt to organize a new crusade in 1514 against the Turks, who captured Knin, led to a powerful popular uprising, after which the authorities were afraid to resort to convening the people's militia even in the face of the Ottoman threat.

== Suleiman's first campaign ==
In 1520, the Turks captured several fortresses in Bosnia and Dalmatia. The new Sultan Suleiman I sent a demand to the Hungarian king to pay tribute, but the Turkish envoy was considered a spy and drowned in Tisa. In 1521, Sderevo Pasha opened military operations against the Hungarians, then Suleiman attacked the southern borders of Hungary with large forces. The fortresses of Šabac, Zemlin (Zimonj) and Belgrade were besieged. The garrison of Sabac, consisting of only one hundred people, all died in the battle, but managed to sell their lives dearly, killing seven hundred Turks. Then Zemlin fell. The defenders of the Belgrade citadel, besieged by the Grand Vizier Piri Mehmed Pasha and the Sultan, repelled 20 attacks, but without receiving the promised help from Ferdinand Habsburg, Poles and Czechs, capitulated on 20 August. There were 400 of them left. The Turks killed the captured Hungarians, and the Bulgarians who participated in the defense were deported to Istanbul. King Lajos II fought with the Turks at Tolna, voivode Istvan Báthory at Petrovaradina, and John Zápolya in Transylvania against the corps akinji under the command of Muhammad Mikhal-ogly. After the capture of Belgrade, the Turks invaded Srem, where they occupied several cities, including Slankamen, Mitrovica, Karlovci, Ilok. Leaving 3 thousand Janissaries in Belgrade, the Sultan returned to Istanbul.

== 1522–1524 ==
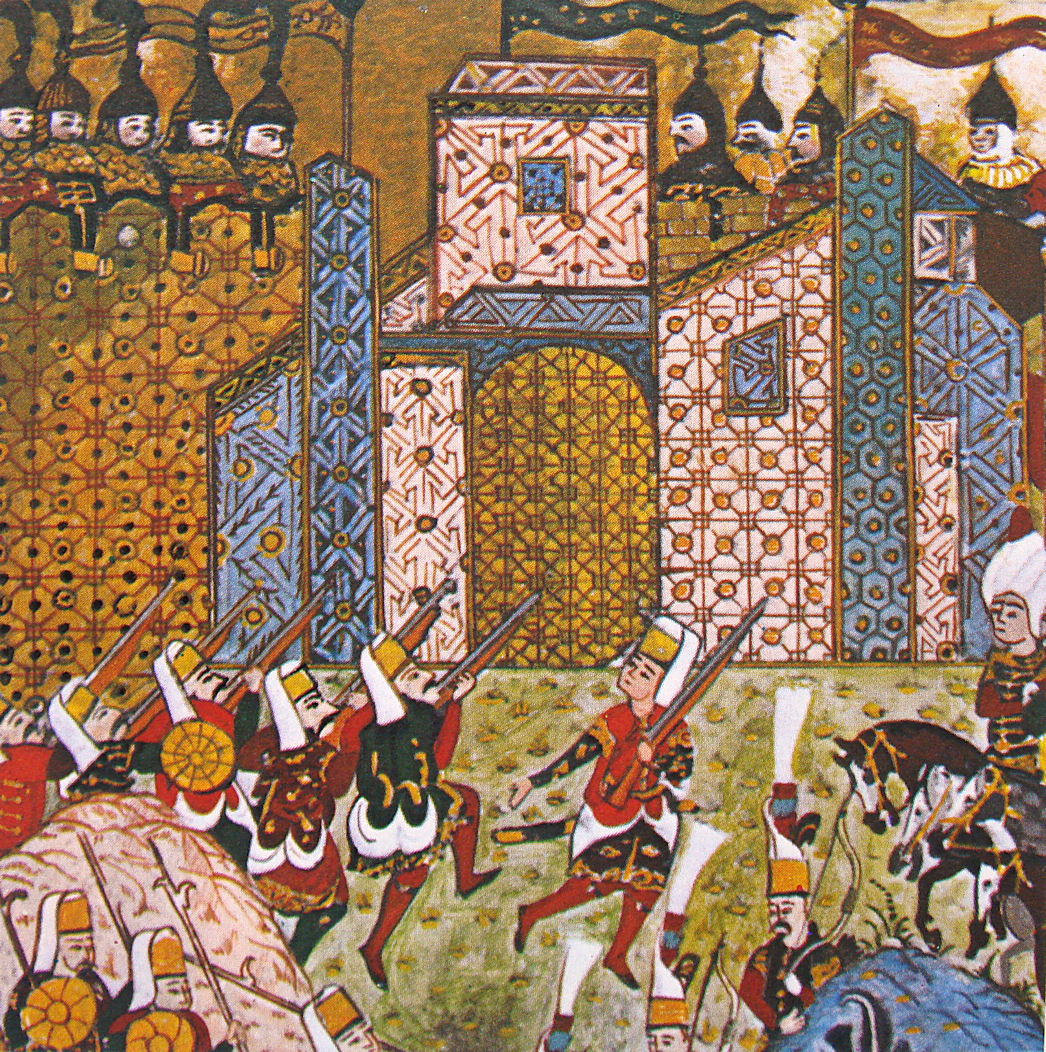
Gun-wielding Ottoman Janissaries and defending Knights of Saint John at the siege of Rhodes, miniature from Süleymannâme

In 1522–1524, there were no large-scale military operations, since the Sultan was busy the conquest of Rhodes, and then planned a war with Persia. The Persian Shah Tahmasp I, in turn, tried to conclude a military alliance with Charles V and Hungary, but due to the long distances, such an alliance could not bring much benefit. In 1522, Turkish attacks continued on Transylvania, Croatia and Slavonia. Unable to organize the defense of all these territories, the Hungarian king transferred the protection of Croatia to the Austrian Archduke Ferdinand of Habsburg. Voivode of Transylvania John Zápolya invaded Wallachia several times to support Radu of Afumați against the Turks. The Wallachian ruler informed the Hungarians about the Ottoman plans; it was assumed that in the event of a new Turkish campaign against Hungary, the Wallachians, together with Zapolyai, would strike the flank and rear of the Ottomans, but by 1526, Radu of Afumați was forced to submit to Istanbul.

== International situation ==
In 1525 it became clear that the Ottoman Sultan was preparing a general offensive against Hungary. The mediation of the Poles, who offered the Turks peace with Hungary, was rejected. The foreign policy situation was unfavorable for the Hungarians. Francis I, taken prisoner by the Spaniards in the Battle of Pavia, began secret relations with the Turks, and in the spring of 1526 received the Sultan's consent to an alliance against the Habsburgs. In May 1526, the League of Cognac united France, Venice and Rome against the Habsburg allies of Hungary. Under these conditions, Lajos II's appeals to Venice, the Pope and Henry VIII for help were unsuccessful. Emperor Charles V was an enemy of the Ottomans, but, forced to fight on several fronts, he considered the first task to be the defeat of the French and their ousting from Italy, the second was the reflection of Turkish aggression in the Mediterranean, and only in third place was the defense of the Middle Danube, which he provided to his brother Ferdinand.

At the same time the most important task for the Habsburgs was to obtain the crowns of Bohemia and Hungary, and this was taken care of by the emperor Maximilian I, who concluded the Vienna Treaty of Mutual Inheritance with King Vladislav in 1515. The Austrian Archduke's help depended on the position of the German Reichstag, which allocated funds for the war, but a reform movement developed in Germa⁸ny, in the early stages of which Luther and his supporters declared that the Turks were God's punishment and could not be resisted. A few years later, when this punishment hung over Germany itself, the views of the German religious teacher changed, but by that time Hungary had already fallen.

The Polish king Sigismund I the Old was connected by wars with the Teutonic Order, and therefore was forced on 1 December 1525, to make peace with the Turks, and to help his nephew as well could not. As a result, Hungary was left to its own devices.

The mercenaries serving in the Hungarian army began to be grouped on the southern border, and they planned to convene another assembly if they still could not raise an adequate number of soldiers.

At the Nuremberg Imperial Assembly, the Hungarian delegation tried with all its might to persuade the Germans to marshal the promised army of twenty-five thousand men, to deploy the Czech army and to call the other Christian states for help. One of the delegates László of Macedonia – referring in part to Szulejmán's campaign in Rhodes – explained that the Turks were not only seeking to conquer Hungary. In addition to helping the country, the papal nuncio Francesco Chieregati also took to the sword. The assembly postponed the response until 22 December and finally again promised a smaller contingent (4,000 people), which it will send to Sopron by 25 May, so that afterwards they could strengthen the guard of the Hungarian and Croatian castles with them. The attention of the Germans was diverted to the Italian War. The Germans did not suspect, but perhaps did not take it seriously, what Sülejmán's real goal was. Spain, which was also at war with the Turks, considered France to be its main opponent. (Note: Frenc, the "most Christian king", moreover, encouraged the Turkish sultan to attack the rear of the Habsburgs, with which he actually directed him to subjugate Hungary. Capable History of Hungary, page 66)

Louis' efforts showed some results in Bohemia, but the Czech orders would have fought against Suleiman if he threatened Prague. Meanwhile, in Prague, Pál Ártándi tried to convince the king to return home, while at home the following year's parliament was postponed three times and only opened on 4 May, two days after Lajos came home. The Polish King Sigismund's proposal to make peace, (Note: The Polish king was at war with the Crimean Tatar Khanate, on whose side regular Turkish regiments often fought, he was also tied up by the Russian war and the fight against the Teutonic Knights and also the confrontation with the German-Roman Emperor Charles V.) otherwise, he called for the necessary sacrifices to be made. The Polish proposal was not accepted by the Hungarian state. And since it was not possible to destroy the Turks, one of the ways would have been to incite the Turks Styria, Krajna and Carinthia, as King Matthias also did it. This, in turn, resulted in the deterioration of Hungarian-German relations, especially because Emperor Miksa fought against the Turks in the 15. In the border wars fought in the second half of the 19th century, he considered Austria to be a party due to the incursions, so he demanded from Mátyás that Austria also be included in the Turkish-Hungarian peace. The attacks carried out in the territory of today's Slovenia were particularly dangerous for the Austrian nobles, because their Slovenian serfs fought the enemy alone, and the attacks intensified the social and even ethnic antagonisms between the two. (Note: In 1515, Slovenian areas, a huge peasant riot broke out, followed by several others, the last of which already engulfed Croatia in flames in 1572.)

Louis II was finally ready to make a decision to pay taxes and let the Turks pass to Austria, but papal and imperial diplomacy prevented him and 1525 in favor of continuing the war, but only if the Austrians and the Poles get involved. 1523. On 12 June, the king and the orders gave separate credentials to Ferenc Dóczy, who was to be sent to the next imperial meeting to be held in the summer. However, the Nuremberg meeting was subsequently postponed for a year, and all aid was refused on the pretext that neither the Czech Republic nor Hungary had fulfilled the imposed conditions.

But Hungary still trusted that the Poles, who had been friendly with them for centuries, as well as the Czechs, Romanians, Russians, Venetians and Austrians, could be mobilized against the Ottoman Turks, (Note: Venice had already maintained representation in Hungary for twenty-five years, but the doge decided that from now on he would rather appoint a secretary instead of an emissary, and replaced Lorenzo Orio, Vincenzo Guidoto went to Buda instead. The republic did not want another war against the empire, although an armed conflict broke out between them again in the year of the disaster in Mohács.) but this was hindered by Hungarian internal strife, like the attacks on Báthory, who was suspected of embezzling seven hundred thousand forints and counterfeiting money. The voivode of Transylvania was among the speakers of the accusations, but the king counted on Szapolyai as a substitute, thus, after Báthory's removal, he took care of the palatine duties himself.

In the last step, the continuation of the war was discussed, and the raising of the necessary funds was aimed at restoring the smoke money. about setting up county armies, to whom the law declared that they owe obedience only to the king!

== Second campaign of Suleiman ==
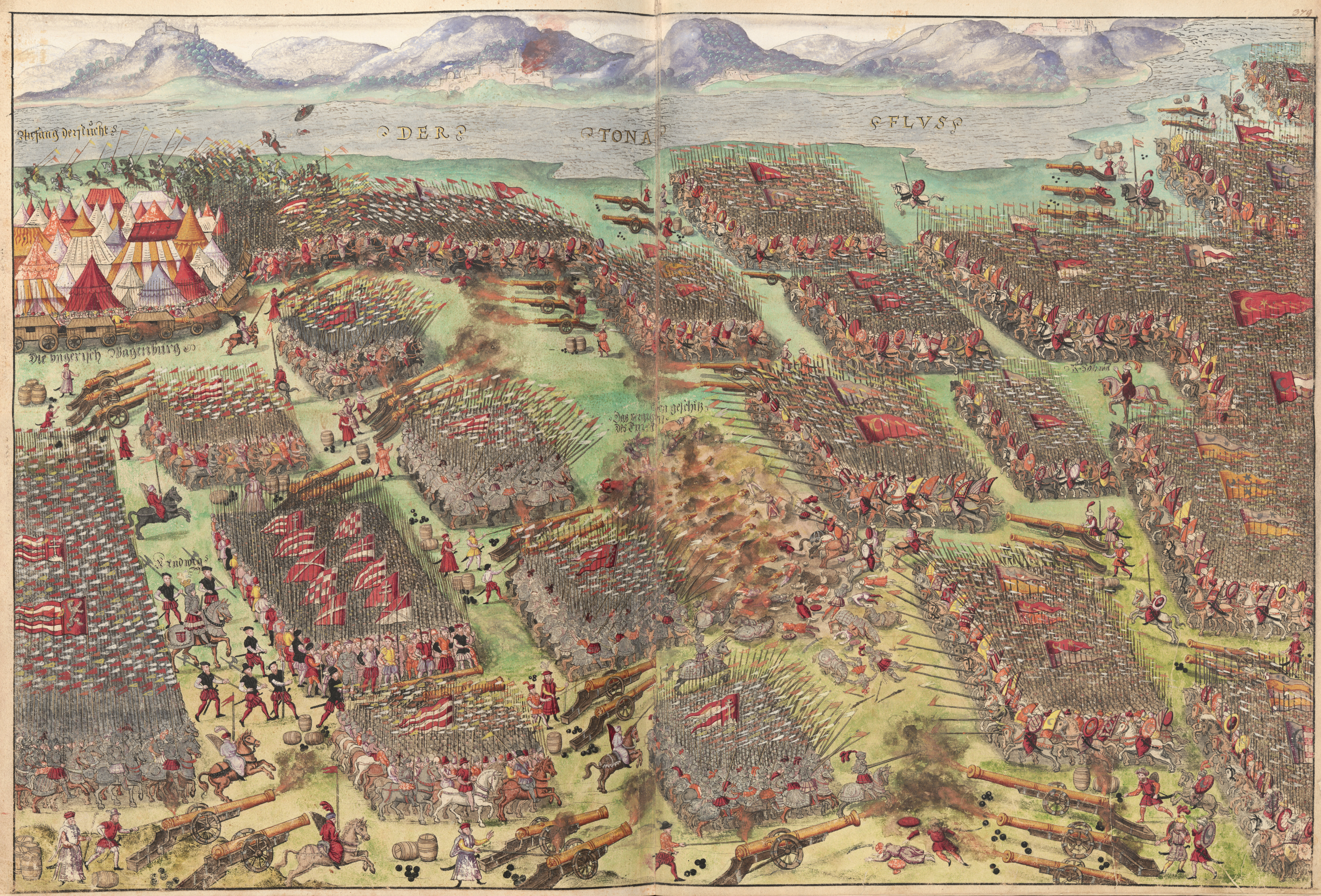
Johann Schreier: Battle of Mohács (1555) It depicts in detail the Hungarian Wagon fort and the Christian infantry, the Hungarian heavy cavalry and artillery, the Serbian hussars (the only Christian light cavalry units in the battle)

In 1525 the Turks carried out several private operations on the Danube: they invaded Croatia, were defeated in Srem by the warlike bishop Pal Tomori, and unsuccessfully besieged the Jajce fortress, which was defended by Christoph Frangepan.

Lajos II tried to obtain military assistance from the assembly of the Hungarian nobility, but the Diet on 12 July 1525, decided that the nobles themselves would not go to war, but would put mercenaries in their place. Rich landowners had to equip 50 reitars, the rest contributed money, with which the comitat had to recruit people and pay them salaries. Church tithes also had to go to support the mercenaries. With such indifference of the ruling class to the fate of the country, it was difficult to hope for victory.

On 25 April 1526 Suleiman set out from Istanbul with an army of 100,000 and 300 guns, and three months later arrived in Belgrade. On 27 July, after a 10-day siege, Petrovaradin was taken, then the Turks built a bridge across Drava at Esek, burned this city and moved inland, not meeting resistance, since the nobility From April to June, she quarreled with the king at the Diet, and did not make any decision. Nador Istvan Báthory, who was supposed to defend Esek, retreated without a fight, citing disobedience among the troops.

== Fall of the Kingdom of Hungary ==
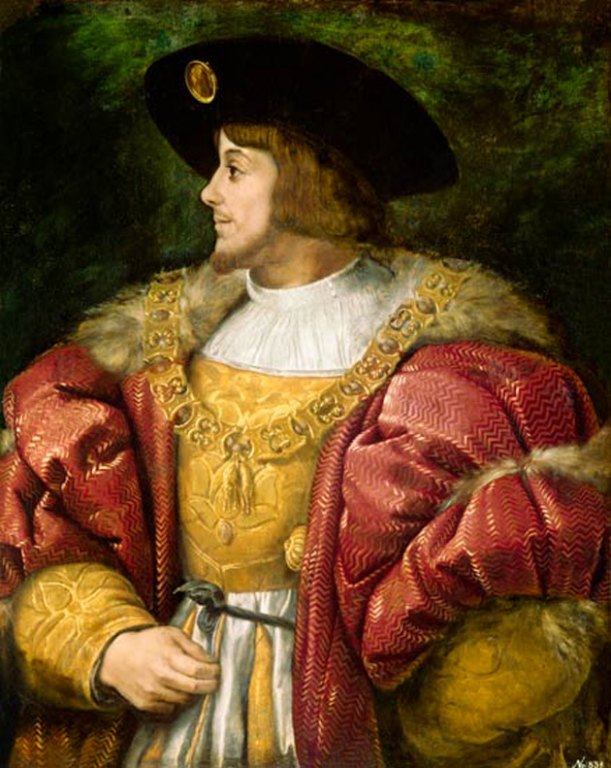
Louis II of Hungary, who died at the Battle of Mohács, painted by Titian

By the second half of August the Hungarians managed to gather about 25 thousand people and 80 guns on the swampy plain near Mohács. A significant part of this army were German, Czech and Serbian mercenaries. These forces were not enough for a general battle. John Zapolya hurried to the rescue with a significant army, and had already reached Szegedin, but Istvan Bathory and other enemies of the Transylvanian governor on 28 August convinced the king to give battle with the available troops. On the morning of 29 August, the Hungarians attacked the Turkish formations. The Ottomans began a feigned retreat, and lured the Hungarian vanguard into artillery fire. The guns, firing almost point-blank, put the Hungarians to flight, and those who were not hacked to death by the Turkish horsemen drowned in the swamp. Apparently, the king also died there. According to Turkish estimates, enemy losses amounted to more than 20 thousand people. Two thousand heads, among which were 7 bishops and several magnates, were stacked in a pyramid in front of the Sultan's tent. The culprit of the defeat, Nador Istvan Bathory, managed to escape. Mohács was burned. Prisoners and peasants captured in the Hungarian camp were slaughtered by order of Suleiman (4 thousand). Only women were spared.

On 10 September the Sultan approached Buda, and the next day it was surrendered without a fight. The Turks plundered and partially burned the Hungarian capital, taking from there the royal treasury and the Corvinus Library. Gathering Hungarian magnates in Pest, the Sultan announced that he agreed to recognize Janos Zapolyai as a vassal king. Turkish troops advanced to Esztergoma, collecting large amounts of booty. Hungary's losses in killed and enslaved people could presumably reach 200 thousand people, that is, almost 1/10 of the population. On 24 September, the Ottoman army marched back, and in November the Sultan returned to Istanbul. The Turks did not establish a foothold on Hungarian territory, and did not place a single garrison north of Srem.

== Results ==
On 10 November 1526 some of the Hungarian magnates elected John Zapolya as king. Archduke Ferdinand of Habsburg soon laid claim to the Hungarian crown and began war the following year. In 1528, Zapolyai, having suffered several defeats, fled to Poland and asked for help from Suleiman. In 1529, the Sultan set out on a campaign against Vienna, which opened a long series of wars with the Austrians in the Middle Danube.

== Sources ==
- B. János Szabó: The Battle of Mohács, Corvina, Budapest 2006. ISBN 963-13-5563-2
- Csorba Csaba – Estók János – Salamon Konrád: Pictorial history of Hungary, Magyar Könyvklub, Budapest 1999. ISBN 963-548-961-7
- Military history of Hungary, Zrínyi military publishing house, Budapest 1985. editor: Ervin Liptai ISBN 963-32-6337-9
- History of Hungary 1526–1686, Chief Editor: Zsigmond Pach, Editor: Ágnes R. Várkonyi, volume 1, Budapest 1985. ISBN 963-05-0929-6
- László Markó: The Hungarian state's dignity from St. Stephen to the present, Hungarian Book Club, Budapest 1999. ISBN 963-547-085-1
- Mohács – Studies, ed.: Lajos Rúzsás and Ferenc Szakály, Akadémiai Kiadó, Budapest 1986. ISBN 963-05-3964-0

Studies used:

1. Ferenc Szakály: Stages of the Turkish-Hungarian conflict before the Battle of Mohács (1365–1526)
2. András Kubinyi: The internal political situation of the Hungarian state before Mohács
3. Domonkos Kosáry: Hungary's foreign policy situation before Mohács
4. Lajos Tardy: Mohács and the failure of the Persian invasion
5. Gyula Káldy-Nagy: The formation of the Turkish state army during the time of Suleiman I
6. Géza Perjés: The Battle of Mohács (29 August 1526)

- Géza Perjés: The battle of Szentgotthárd 1964, Szentgotthárd, local knowledge studies, Szombathely, 1981. ISBN 963-03-1192-5
- Petrosyan Yu. A. Ottoman Empire. Power and death. – M.: Nauka, 1990. – ISBN 5-02-017026-7
- Semenova L. E. Principalities of Wallachia and Moldavia. Late 14th – early 19th centuries. — M.: Indrik. — ISBN 5-85759-363-8
