= Hunyadi family =

Hungarian noble family

Hunyadi
- John Hunyadi's extended coat-of-arms (granted to him in 1453 by King Ladislaus V of Hungary)
- Country: Kingdom of Hungary and Croatia; Certain Lands of the Bohemian Crown (Moravia, Lower Lusatia, Upper Lusatia, Silesia); Duchy of Austria; Duchy of Styria
- Founded: 1409; 617 years ago
- Founder: Voyk
- Final ruler: Christopher Corvinus
- Titles: King of Hungary; King of Bohemia; King of Croatia; Duke of Austria; Duke of Beuthen; Duke of Leobschütz; Duke of Liptó; Duke of Loslau; Duke of Ratibor; Duke of Slavonia; Duke of Tost; Duke of Troppau; Perpetual Count of Beszterce
- Dissolution: 1505; 521 years ago

The House of Hunyadi was one of the most powerful noble families in the Kingdom of Hungary during the 15th century. A member of the family, Matthias Corvinus, was King of Hungary from 1458 until 1490, King of Bohemia (ruling in Moravia, Lower Lusatia, Upper Lusatia, and Silesia) from 1469 until 1490, and Duke of Austria from 1487 until 1490. His illegitimate son, John Corvinus, ruled the Duchy of Troppau from 1485 until 1501, and five further Silesian duchies, including Bytom, Głubczyce, Loslau, Racibórz, and Tost, from 1485 until 1490. The Hunyadi coat-of-arms depicted a raven with a golden ring in its beak.

The founder of the family, Voyk, received the eponymous Hunyad Castle (in present-day Hunedoara, Romania) from Sigismund, King of Hungary, in 1409 (Hunyadi meaning "of/from Hunyad" in Hungarian). His ethnicity is the subject of scholarly debate. Some modern historians describe him as a Vlach, or Romanian, knez or boyar, from either Wallachia or Transylvania. Others describe him as a Cuman or Slav nobleman. According to the 15th-century historian, Johannes de Thurocz, Voyk moved from Wallachia to Transylvania. Voyk's oldest son, John Hunyadi, was often mentioned as a "Vlach" by his contemporaries.

John Hunyadi, a military commander, became the first member of the family to acquire the status of "true baron of the realm". He was appointed Ban of Severin in 1439, and Voivode of Transylvania in 1441. He was also granted the title Perpetual Count of Beszterce in 1452, thus receiving the first hereditary title created in the Kingdom of Hungary. At his death, John Hunyadi held many lands throughout the Kingdom. John Hunyadi's fame and fortune led to the election of his son, Matthias Corvinus, as King of Hungary in 1458. He attempted to secure a hereditary line of succession for his son, John Corvinus. This did not happen, however, and John was only able to retain the Duchy of Glogau, along with some other family domains in Hungary, after Matthias died in 1490. John's only son, Christopher Corvinus, was the last male member of the family. He died at the age of six in 1505. His sister Elisabeth died during childhood.

== Origins ==
The family was given its land by Sigismund, King of Hungary, on 18 October 1409. On that day, Sigismund granted Hunyad Castle and its demesne to Voyk and four of his kinsmen. In addition to Voyk, the grant lists his two brothers, Magas and Radol, their cousin or uncle also named Radol, and Voyk's son, John, the future Regent of Hungary. Magas means "tall", and is evidently a Hungarian name. The grant mentioned that Voyk's father was named "Serbe", but did not say anything further about the origins of the family. Turkologist László Rásonyi, in his analysis of the family names and heraldry, says that Serbe's name is of Cuman origin and is related to the Kyrgyz and Kazakh word for unlucky (šor). He adds that the Turkic origin of Serbe's name explains that Voyk's name also comes from the Turkic bay, meaning "prince" or "lord".

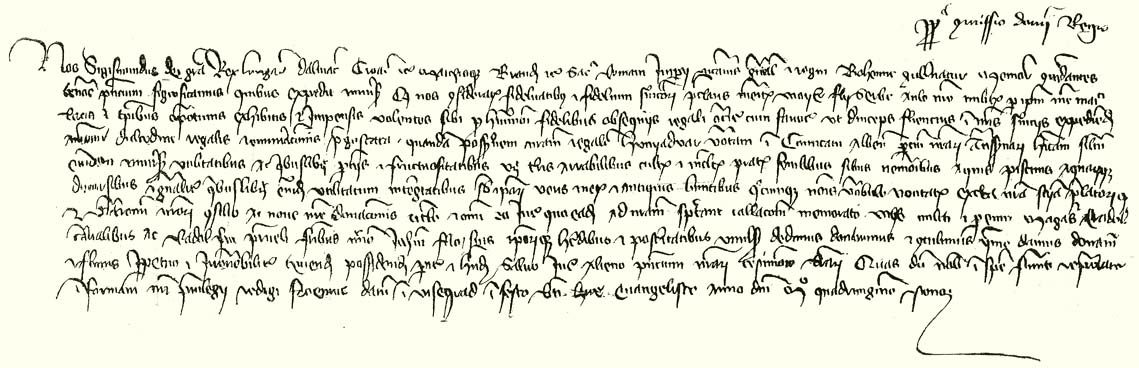
King Sigismund of Hungary's grant of Hunyad Castle to Voyk and his relatives

Voyk's son, John Hunyadi, bore the nickname "Olah", meaning "Vlach", in his youth, which implied that he was of Romanian stock. The court historian of Voyk's grandson King Matthias Corvinus, Antonio Bonfini, explicitly stated that John had been "born to a Vlach father". Holy Roman Emperor Frederick III likewise knew that King Matthias had been "born to a Vlach father", and a Venetian man, Sebastiano Baduario, referred to the Romanians as King Matthias's people.

Historians of the 15th and 16th centuries, with perspectives that were either against or in favour of the family, wrote differing reports of the family's status before King Sigismund's grant. Jan Długosz described John Hunyadi as "a man of unknown origin", and he is likewise mentioned as "a Vlach by birth, not highly born" by Aeneas Silvius Piccolomini. On the other hand, Johannes de Thurocz said that John Hunyadi "was descended from a noble and renowned race of Wallachia".

John Hunyadi's rapid advance, which astonished his contemporaries, and gave rise to legends about his origins. According to one of these stories, recorded in detail by the 16th-century historian Gáspár Heltai, John Hunyadi was the illegitimate son of King Sigismund with a woman named Elizabeth, who was the daughter of a "rich boyar" from Morzsina in Hunyad County. Antonio Bonfini, on the other hand, wrote that John Hunyadi's mother was an unnamed Greek woman who was related to the Byzantine Emperors.

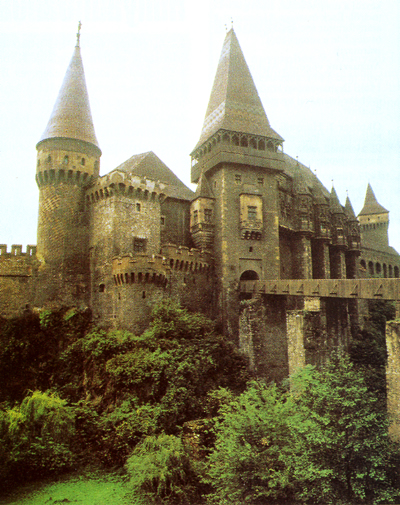
The Gothic and Renaissance Hunyad Castle (in present-day Hunedoara, Romania), built on the demesne that the family was named after

Further legends emerged about the purported Roman origin of the family. Antonio Bonfini wrote that John Hunyadi "traced his kin to the Roman family of the Corvini". This story is connected to the Hunyadis' coat-of-arms, which depicts a raven, corvus in Latin, with a golden ring in its beak. Coins minted for Prince Vladislav I of Wallachia in 1365 depict a raven-like bird. Based on this similarity, Zsuzsa Teke and some other historians did not exclude the possibility that the Hunyadis were related to the Basarabs, the ruling dynasty of Wallachia. Another historian, Péter E. Kovács, wrote that that theory needed further verification.

Johannes de Thurocz also wrote that King Sigismund, fascinated by Voyk's fame, "took him away from Wallachia to his own realm and settled him there", suggesting that Voyk moved from his Wallachian homeland to the Kingdom of Hungary. The late 15th-century historian Philippe de Commines referred to Voyk's son John as the "White Knight of Wallachia". In accordance with these sources, Pál Engel, András Kubinyi, and other contemporary historians have written that the Hunyadi family descended from Wallachian boyars (noblemen).

Based on the genealogy of Nicolaus Olahus (nephew of John Hunyadi), which states that John Hunyadi's sister received the estate of Corbii de Piatră ("in Transalpina castrum Walachika lingua Corvi de Piatra") from her brother, and on the writings of Antonio Bonfini and Pietro Ranzano which stated that John Hunyadi was born in the "ancestral village [in Corvino vico], which is also called Corvinum in our time", it has been proposed that the Hunyadi family originates from Corbii de Piatră (today Corbi, Argeș County) in Wallachia. A castle had existed there until at least the 16th century and the village was also referred to as an "old and hereditary estate" of Jupan Mogos, likely the same person as Voyk's brother Magas, in a charter from 1456 by Vladislav II of Wallachia. Voyk may have also been born in the same village. The origin of the family in Corbii de Piatră might also explain the raven on their coat-of-arms.

According to another view on the family's origins, which is championed by historians Camil Mureșanu and Ion-Aurel Pop, Voyk did not migrate from Wallachia, but was born in a family of Romanian noble knezes from the region of Hátszeg, or Hunyad. They say that Voyk's grandfather could have been a man named "Costea", mentioned in a royal charter from 1360, and who fathered a son named Serbe (the name of Voyk's father). According to the charter, Costea and Serbe together established two villages in the region of Hátszeg.

Historian Dezső Dümmerth offers a third view of the Hunyadis' ancestry. He said that Voyk was of Cuman stock, one of the Wallachian boyars. Turkologist László Rásonyi concludes: "the names of János Hunyadi's father and grandfather and the use of raven in the coat-of-arms of the family clearly point to the Tatar-Cuman origin of the later Hunyadi family".

Miklós Molnár, accepts the Wallachian origin of the family, but also represents a fourth perspective on the origins of the family. He said that they may well have been of Slavic descent. Neither Paul Lendvai nor András Boros-Kazai excluded the possibility of the Hunyadis being of Slavic origin.

=== Genetics ===
Bone samples were collected in the Corvinus grave from the remains of John Corvinus and Christopher Corvinus in the church of the Blessed Virgin Mary in Lepoglava by the Institute of Hungarian Research in 2021 to define their genetic composition. This information will be crucial for possible identification of the remains of King Matthias Corvinus from among the bones stored in the ossuary at Székesfehérvár. The team of Endre Neparáczki successfully identified the DNA profile of the last two male members of the Hunyadi family by next-generation sequencing technology, and the genetic study was published in Heliyon in 2022.

John Corvinus and Christopher Corvinus carried the paternal Y-chromosome haplogroup E1b1b1a1b1a6a1c~ (E-BY4281), which is widespread in Eurasia. This haplogroup belongs to the E-V13 clade which is part of the E-M78 branch. The father-son relationship was also verified. The closest ancient genetic matches to the paternal haplogroup of the Hunyadi descendants are a sample from the Otrar-Karatau culture in the Iron Age Kazakh steppe and a sample from Medieval Sardinia. The closest genetic sample matches from the Carpathian Basin to the Hunyadi genome were detected in Avar individuals, elite Hungarian Conquerors and in a Medieval Hungarian nobleman from the Hungarian Royal Basilica.

John Corvinus belongs to the T2b mitochondrial haplogroup, his maternal lineage widespread haplogroup throughout Eurasia. His son Christopher Corvinus belongs to the rare T2c1+146 mitochondrial haplogroup, his maternal lineage was already present in the Neolithic era on the territory of present-day Hungary but most frequent around the Mediterranean. Both maternal lines are consistent with the known origin of their mothers.

Archaeogenomic analysis indicated that John and Christopher Corvinus had an ancient European genome composition. The majority genome components of John Corvinus were present in the Carpathian Basin thousands of years ago, the highest shared drift are with European Neolithic samples (which peoples can also be traced back to the Carpathian Basin) and Hungarian Neolithic samples: Transdanubian Lengyel culture, Bodrogkeresztúr culture, Körös culture, Alföld Linear Pottery culture. The genome of Christopher Corvinus also has a shared drift with a sample from the Croatian Copper Age Vučedol culture, which was received from his mother. The Corvinus genome contains these admixture components: 50% Neolithic Anatolian, 31% Ancient North Eurasian, 8% Iranian Neolithic, 5% Western Hunter gatherer, 3% Early Bronze Age and 2% Han. At the individual level, the 10 most similar samples were from Russia, Croatia, Romania and Hungary, while at the population level, it clustered with populations from northern Italy, Spain, Basque Country, France, Croatia and Hungary. The greatest similarity to this medieval Corvinus genome is found with today's southern European and Carpathian Basin populations, and also with individuals from the Eastern European steppe.

In 2024, the Institute of Hungarian Research published the results of the archeogenetic study of the Hungarian noble Aba family. The genetic results uncovered dynastic connections that were not documented in written sources. It was revealed that members of the Aba family were related to significant medieval Hungarian noble families such as the Árpáds, the Báthorys, and the Hunyadis. The genetic analysis revealed kinship ties among these prominent Hungarian families, suggesting that marital connections were common within the noble class of the medieval Kingdom of Hungary.

== Notable members ==
=== Voyk Hunyadi ===
Voyk was born in Wallachia, according to the nearly contemporaneous historians Johannes de Thurocz and Gáspár Heltai. Voyk had been serving as a "court knight" in the royal court when he received the demesne of Hunyad from King Sigismund, suggesting that he was descended from a prominent Wallachian family. Modern historian Kubinyi wrote that Voyk most probably joined Sigismund in 1395. In this year, Sigismund invaded Wallachia and restored his vassal, Mircea the Elder, to the princely throne.

He was last mentioned in a royal charter in 1414. Voyk died before 12 February 1419. On this day, a charter confirming the grant of 1409 was issued for Voyk's brother, Radol, and for Voyk's three sons: John the Elder, John the Younger, and Voyk.

=== John Hunyadi, Sr. ===
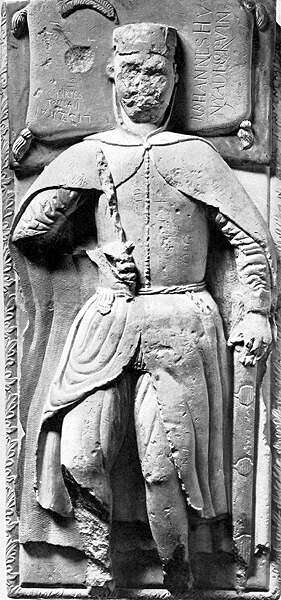
The cover of John Hunyadi's tomb in the Roman Catholic Cathedral of Gyulafehérvár (present-day Alba Iulia, Romania)

Voyk's oldest son John Hunyadi was born between about 1405 and 1407. In his youth, he served in the court of George Csáky, Filippo Scolari, and King Sigismund's other warlike barons. He married Elizabeth Szilágyi around 1429. Her father owned properties in Bodrog County.

John Hunyadi developed his military skills during his journeys in Italy and Bohemia in Sigismund's entourage in the early 1430s. He and his younger brother (who was his namesake) were jointly appointed Ban of Szörény (present-day Drobeta-Turnu Severin, Romania) in 1439 by Sigismund's successor, King Albert. With this appointment, they acquired the status of "true barons".

The senior John Hunyadi became Voivode of Transylvania and Count of the Székelys in 1441, with responsibility for the defense of the southern borders of Hungary against Ottoman raids. He defeated the Ottomans in several battles during his "long campaign" in the Balkan Peninsula in 1443. The Estates of the realm elected him governor for the period of King Ladislaus V of Hungary's minority in 1446. King Ladislaus bestowed the title of Perpetual Count of Beszterce (present-day Bistrița, Romania) upon John Hunyadi after he resigned the governorship in 1452. This was the first example of a grant of a hereditary title in the Kingdom of Hungary. John Hunyadi had by that time become the richest landowner in the Kingdom of Hungary, holding about 25 fortresses, 30 towns, and more than 1,000 villages. He died on 11 August 1456, shortly after his greatest victory over the Ottomans at the Siege of Belgrade.

=== John Hunyadi, Jr. ===
John the Younger was the younger of Voyk's two sons that shared the name John, and was first mentioned in a charter issued to four members of his family on 12 February 1419. King Albert of Hungary appointed him Ban of Szörény together with his brother, John the Elder, in 1439. He died fighting against the Ottomans in 1441. His brother wrote of him as "the valiant of the valiant", showing that John the Younger was regarded a brave soldier.

=== Ladislaus Hunyadi ===
Ladislaus Hunyadi was the older of the two sons of John Hunyadi the elder by Elizabeth Szilágyi. He was born around 1432. At the age of 20, he was appointed ispán, or count, of Pozsony County, which made him a "true baron". He became Ban of Croatia in 1453 and master of the horse in 1456.

With his father's death, Ladislaus inherited an enormous domain in 1456. The ambitious Ladislaus had his father's main opponent, Ulrich II, Count of Celje, captured and murdered on 9 November. The King, who promised amnesty to Ladislaus under duress, had him arrested in next year. Ladislaus was sentenced to death for high treason. He was executed on 16 March 1457.

=== Matthias Corvinus ===
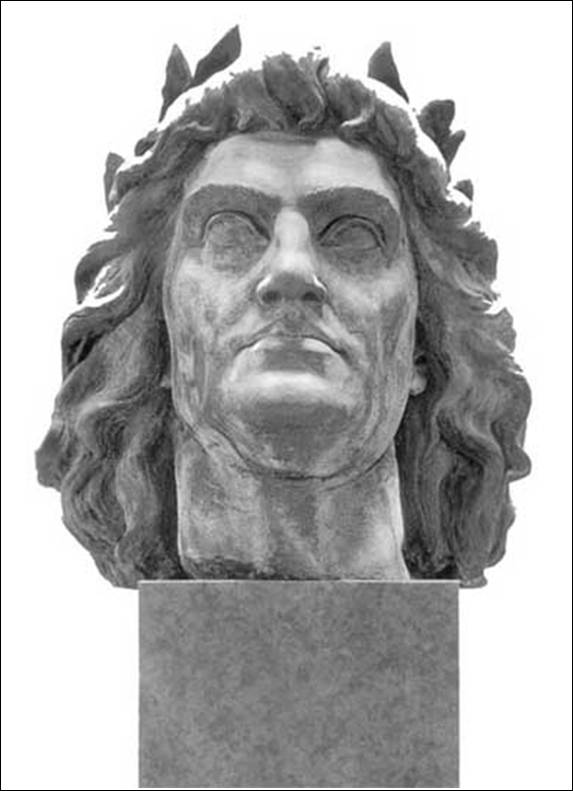
A contemporaneous sculpture of Matthias Corvinus

Matthias, the younger son of John Hunyadi the elder and Elizabeth Szilágyi, was born on 23 February 1443. He was arrested upon the orders of King Ladislaus V of Hungary on 14 March 1457, together with his elder brother Ladislaus. Matthias's brother was executed two days after having been arrested. Fearing a revolt, the King fled to Prague and took Matthias with him.

The childless Ladislaus V died on 23 November 1457. A Diet was convened to elect the new monarch. Matthias' maternal uncle, Michael Szilágyi, arrived with more than 10,000 armed noblemen under his command, and the Diet proclaimed Matthias king on 24 January 1458. Matthias returned from Prague, but was only crowned with the Holy Crown of Hungary on 29 March 1464, because he had spent the previous years with fighting against his opponents.

Urged by Pope Paul II, Matthias led a crusade against the Czech Hussites and occupied great parts of Moravia and Silesia in 1468. The Catholic Estates of Moravia proclaimed him King of Bohemia on 3 May 1469. Matthias' reign was also recognized in Lusatia and Silesia, but Bohemia proper remained under the rule of his opponents, Kings George of Poděbrady (till 1471) and Vladislaus II Jagiellon. Through a series of wars, Matthias occupied Lower Austria and Styria between 1480 and 1487. He officially adopted the title of Duke of Austria in 1487.

Matthias married his first wife, Catherine of Poděbrady, in 1461. She died in childbirth in 1464. His second wife, Beatrice of Naples, whom he married in 1476, was infertile. In the last decade of his life, Matthias tried to ensure the succession of his illegitimate son, John Corvinus, to the throne of Hungary. Matthias died on 6 April 1490.

=== John Corvinus ===
John Corvinus was the illegitimate son of King Matthias and his mistress, Barbara Edelpöck. John Corvinus was born on 2 April 1473. Matthias recognized in public that John is his son and granted him the title of Duke of Liptó (present-day Liptov, Slovakia) in 1481. John Corvinus received a number of land grants from his father in the subsequent years. King Matthias granted him the Duchy of Troppau and five further Silesian duchies—Beuthen, Leobschütz, Loslau, Ratibor, and Tost—in 1485.

King Matthias' all attempts to secure his son's succession to the throne proved to be useless shortly after his death. The prelates and the barons elected Vladislaus II Jagiellon king on 15 July 1490. He retained his domains and the Duchy of Troppau. The new monarch bestowed the title of Duke of Slavonia upon him, but he renounced of it in 1495. He also renounced of the Duchy of Troppau in 1501.

John Corvinus married Beatrice de Frangepan in 1496. She gave birth to two children, Elizabeth and Christopher. John Corvinus died on 12 October 1504. His son died at the age of six, his daughter at the age of twelve.

== Family tree ==
The following family tree depicts the known members of the Hunyadi family:

(* = born; † = died; ∞ = wife or husband; b. = before; c. = in about; m. = mentioned)

Costea (?) (Note: Costea was Serbe's father, according to historian Ion-Aurel Pop.)
Serbe † b. 1409	Radol (?) (Note: Radol was either the brother or the nephew of Serbe.) (m. in 1409)
Voyk (m. 1409–1414) † b. 1419 ∞(Elizabeth) Morzsinai (?) (Note: The chronicler Gáspár Heltai writes that John Hunyadi's mother was the unnamed daughter of a boyar of Morzsina. On the other hand, the chronicler Antonio Bonfini says that John Hunyadi was born to a distinguished Greek woman.)	Magas (m. in 1409)	Radol (m. 1409–1419) † b. 1429 ∞Ankó Branicskai
John Hunyadi, Sr. (?) (Note: According to a popular legend, John Hunyadi the elder was King Sigismund of Hungary's illegitimate son.) * c. 1405 † 1456 ∞Elizabeth Szilágyi	John Hunyadi, Jr. (m. 1419–1441) † 1441	Voyk (m. in 1419)	Daughter ∞John Székely of Szentgyörgy	Clara (?) (Note: A charter from April 1456 (source: Teleki József. Hunyadiak kora Magyarországon p.495) mentions Clara as John Hunyadi's maternal sister. However, taking into account the uncertainty of medieval terminology, she may well have been his full sister, according to historian András Kubinyi. Her second son, Andrew Pongrác of Dengeleg was King Matthias Corvinus's Master of the cupbearers, and his younger brother, John Pongrác of Dengeleg served the King as Voivode of Transylvania for eight years.) (m. 1450–1467) ∞George Pongrác of Dengeleg	Marina (?) (Note: Nicolaus Olahus writes, in his Hungaria, that his grandmother, Marina was John Hunyadi's sister who married a member of the Basarab dynasty. According to Kubinyi and Mureșanu, she must have rather been a distant relative (paternal aunt or niece) of Hunyadi.) ∞Manzilla of Argeș
Ladislaus Hunyadi * c. 1432 † 1457	Matthias Corvinus * 1443 † 1490; 1∞Elizabeth of Celje 2∞Catherine of Poděbrady 3∞Beatrice of Naples
John Corvinus (illegitimate son) * 1473 † 1504 ∞Beatrice de Frangepan
Elisabeth Corvinus * 1496 † 1508	Christopher Corvinus * 1499 † 1505	Matthias * 1504 † 1505

== See also ==
- List of titled noble families in the Kingdom of Hungary

== Sources ==
=== Primary sources ===
- Aeneas Silvius Piccolomini: Europe (c. 1400–1458) (Translated by Robert Brown, introduced and commented by Nancy Bisaha) (2013). The Catholic University of America Press. ISBN 978-0-8132-2182-3.
- The Annals of Jan Długosz (An English abridgement by Maurice Michael, with commentary by Paul Smith) (1997). IM Publications. ISBN 1-901019-00-4.
- Thuróczy János: Magyar krónika (Fordította Geréb László, a szöveget átnézte Kardos Tibor, a fordítást ellenőrizte Mezey László) [János Thuróczy: Chronicle of the Hungarians (Translated by László Geréb, the text revised by Tibor Kardos, and the translation is supervised by László Mezey)] (1957). Magyar Helikon.

=== Secondary sources ===
- Agnew, Hugh (2004). The Czechs and the Lands of the Bohemian Crown. Hoover Institution Press. ISBN 978-0-8179-4491-9.
- Armbruster, Adolf (1972). Romanitatea românilor: Istoria unei idei [The Romanity of the Romanians: The History of an Idea]. Romanian Academy Publishing House.
- Bak, János (1994). "The Late Medieval Period, 1382–1526". In Sugar, Peter F.; Hanák, Péter; Frank, Tibor (eds.). A History of Hungary. Indiana University Press. pp. 54–82. ISBN 963-7081-01-1.
- Bolovan, Ioan; Constantiniu, Florin; Michelson, Paul E.; Pop, Ioan Aurel; Popa, Cristian; Popa, Marcel; Scurtu, Ioan; Treptow, Kurt W.; Vultur, Marcela; Watts, Larry L. (1997). A History of Romania. The Center for Romanian Studies. ISBN 973-98091-0-3.
- Boros-Kazai, András (2005). "Hungary". In Frucht, Richard (ed.). Eastern Europe: An Introduction to the People, Lands, and Culture. ABC Clio. pp. 329–412. ISBN 1-57607-801-9.
- Cartledge, Bryan (2011). The Will to Survive: A History of Hungary. C. Hurst & Co. ISBN 978-1-84904-112-6.
- Dümmerth, Dezső (1985). A két Hunyadi [The Two Hunyadis] (in Hungarian). Panoráma. ISBN 963-243-279-7.
- E. Kovács, Péter (1990). Matthias Corvinus (in Hungarian). Officina Nova. ISBN 963-7835-49-0.
- Engel, Pál (2001). The Realm of St Stephen: A History of Medieval Hungary, 895–1526. I.B. Tauris Publishers. ISBN 1-86064-061-3.
- Fine, John V. A (1994). The Late Medieval Balkans: A Critical Survey from the Late Twelfth Century to the Ottoman Conquest. The University of Michigan Press. ISBN 0-472-08260-4.
- Kubinyi, András (2008). Matthias Rex. Balassi Kiadó. ISBN 978-963-506-767-1.
- Lendvai, Paul (2003). The Hungarians: A Thousand Years of Victory in Defeat. Princeton University Press. ISBN 978-0-691-11969-4.
- Makkai, László (1994). "The Three Nations of Transylvania (1360–1526)". In Köpeczi, Béla; Barta, Gábor; Bóna, István; Makkai, László; Szász, Zoltán; Borus, Judit (eds.). History of Transylvania. Akadémiai Kiadó. pp. 178–243. ISBN 963-05-6703-2.
- Markó, László (2000). A magyar állam főméltóságai Szent Istvántól napjainkig: Életrajzi lexikon [Great Officers of the State of Hungary from St Stephen to Present Days: Biographical Enncyclopedia] (in Hungarian). Magyar Könyvklub. ISBN 963-547-085-1.
- Molnár, Miklós (2001). A Concise History of Hungary. Cambridge University Press. ISBN 978-0-521-66736-4.
- Mureșanu, Camil (2001). John Hunyadi: Defender of Christendom. The Center for Romanian Studies. ISBN 973-9432-18-2.
- Nagy, Levente; Szilágyi, Emőke Rita (2023). "Hollókőtől Esztergomig. Új adatok az Oláh, a Hunyadi és a Drakula család genealógiájához" [From Hollókő to Esztergom. New Data on the Genealogy of the Oláh, Hunyadi and Dracula Families] (PDF). Történelmi Szemle (in Hungarian). Hungarian Academy of Sciences. ISSN 0040-9634.
- Neparáczki, Endre; Kis, Luca; Maróti, Zoltán; Kovács, Bence; Varga, Gergely I.B.; Makoldi, Miklós; Horolma, Pamjav; Teiszler, Éva; Tihanyi, Balázs; Nagy, Péter L.; Maár, Kitti; Gyenesei, Attila; Schütz, Oszkár; Dudás, Eszter; Török, Tibor; Pascuttini-Juraga, Vesna; Peharda, Ivančica; Vizi, László Tamás; Horváth-Lugossy, Gábor; Kásler, Miklós (16 November 2022). "The genetic legacy of the Hunyadi descendants". Heliyon. 8 (11) e11731. Bibcode:2022Heliy...811731N. doi:10.1016/j.heliyon.2022.e11731. PMC 9678726. PMID 36425424.
- Pop, Ioan-Aurel (2005). "Transylvania in the 14th century and the first half of the 15th century (1300–1456)". In Pop, Ioan-Aurel; Nägler, Thomas (eds.). The History of Transylvania, Vol. I. (Until 1541). Romanian Cultural Institute (Center for Transylvanian Studies). pp. 247–298. ISBN 973-7784-00-6.
- Pop, Ioan-Aurel (2012). "The Names in the Family of King Matthias Corvinus: From Old Sources to Contemporary Historiography" (PDF). Ethnographica et Folkloristica Carpathica. 17 / 35. Debreceni Egyetem Néprajzi Tanszék: 11–40. ISSN 0139-0600.
- Rásonyi, László (1982). "The Old-Hungarian name Vajk: A note on the origin of the Hunyadi family". Acta Orientalia Academiae Scientiarum Hungaricae. 36 (1/3): 419–428. ISSN 0001-6446. JSTOR 23657865.
- Rădulescu-Codin, Constantin (1922). Muscelul nostru. Comuna Corbi și locuitorii săi [Our Muscel. The Commune of Corbi and its inhabitants] (in Romanian). OCLC 1550345285.
- Teke, Zsuzsa (1980). Hunyadi János és kora [John Hunyadi and his Times] (in Hungarian). Gondolat. ISBN 963-280-951-3.

== Literature ==
- Mănescu, Jean-Nicholas: Das Oswaldussymbol in der Wappenwelt Osteuropas. Tom C. Bergroth (edited): Genealogica & Heraldica. Report of The 16th International Congress of Genealogical and Heraldic Sciences in Helsinki 16-21 August 1984. Helsinki 1984, p. 415-424. ISBN 951-99640-4-5
