= Christopher Corvinus =

Son of John Corvinus

- Born: 8 August 1499; Bihać, Kingdom of Croatia in personal union with Hungary
- Died: 17 March 1505 (aged 5)
- Burial: Lepoglava
- House: Hunyadi
- Father: John Corvinus
- Mother: Beatrice de Frangepan
- Religion: Roman Catholicism

Christopher Corvinus or Christopher Hunyadi (Croatian: Krsto Korvin, Hungarian: Corvin Kristóf; 8 August 1499 in Bihać – 17 March 1505) was Prince of Hungary and the last male member of the Hungarian Royal House of Hunyadi.

== Life ==
He was born in Bihać, Kingdom of Croatia in personal union with Hungary, in the year 1499. His father was John Corvinus, an illegitimate son of King Matthias I. His mother was Beatrice de Frangepan, the member of a famous Hungarian noble family. His sister was Elisabeth, fiancée of György Zápolya, King John Zapolya's younger brother, and his brother was Matthias. After his father's death in 1504, he became the head of the Hunyadi family. However, he died soon after, and the royal house became extinct in the male line, as his brother Matthias also died that same year. It was rumoured that they had been poisoned. His sister, Elisabeth also died shortly afterward, without issue. Christopher was buried at the monastery of Lepoglava, beside his father.

== Bibliography ==
- Schönherr, Gyula: Hunyadi Corvin János (János Corvinus Hunyadi), Franklin-Társulat, Budapest, 1894 URL: See External links
