= Ox tax =

Ox Tax (Hungarian: ököradó) is a tax of the Szeklers of Transylvania in medieval Hungarian law. When a boy was born by the Queen, the "pedestrian" i.e. footsoldier Székelys had to contribute for the treasury one ox after every six oxen of theirs. When Louis II of Hungary was born in 1506, the Szeklers refused to pay this tax, therefore, king Vladislas II of Hungary sent Pál Tomori to Transylvania in order to collect the tax, but his troops were beaten at Marosvásárhely (Romanian: Târgu Mureş) by the Szeklers.
