= George Zápolya =

Hungarian military general

George Zápolya de Szepes
- Born: c. 1488
- Died: presumably August 29, 1526; Mohács, Hungary
- Military career
- Allegiance: Kingdom of Hungary (1301–1526)
- Rank: General
- Conflicts: Battle of Mohács

Count George Zápolya de Szepes (Croatian: Juraj Zapolja, Hungarian: Szapolyai György or Zápolya György, Romanian: Gheorghe Zápolya, Slovak: Juraj Zápoľský; c. 1488 – 29 August 1526) was a Hungarian magnate, son of Palatine Stephen Zápolya and younger brother of King John I of Hungary (János Zápolya). He served as Hereditary Lord Lieutenant (Count; supremus et perpetuus comes) of Szepes County.

== Background ==
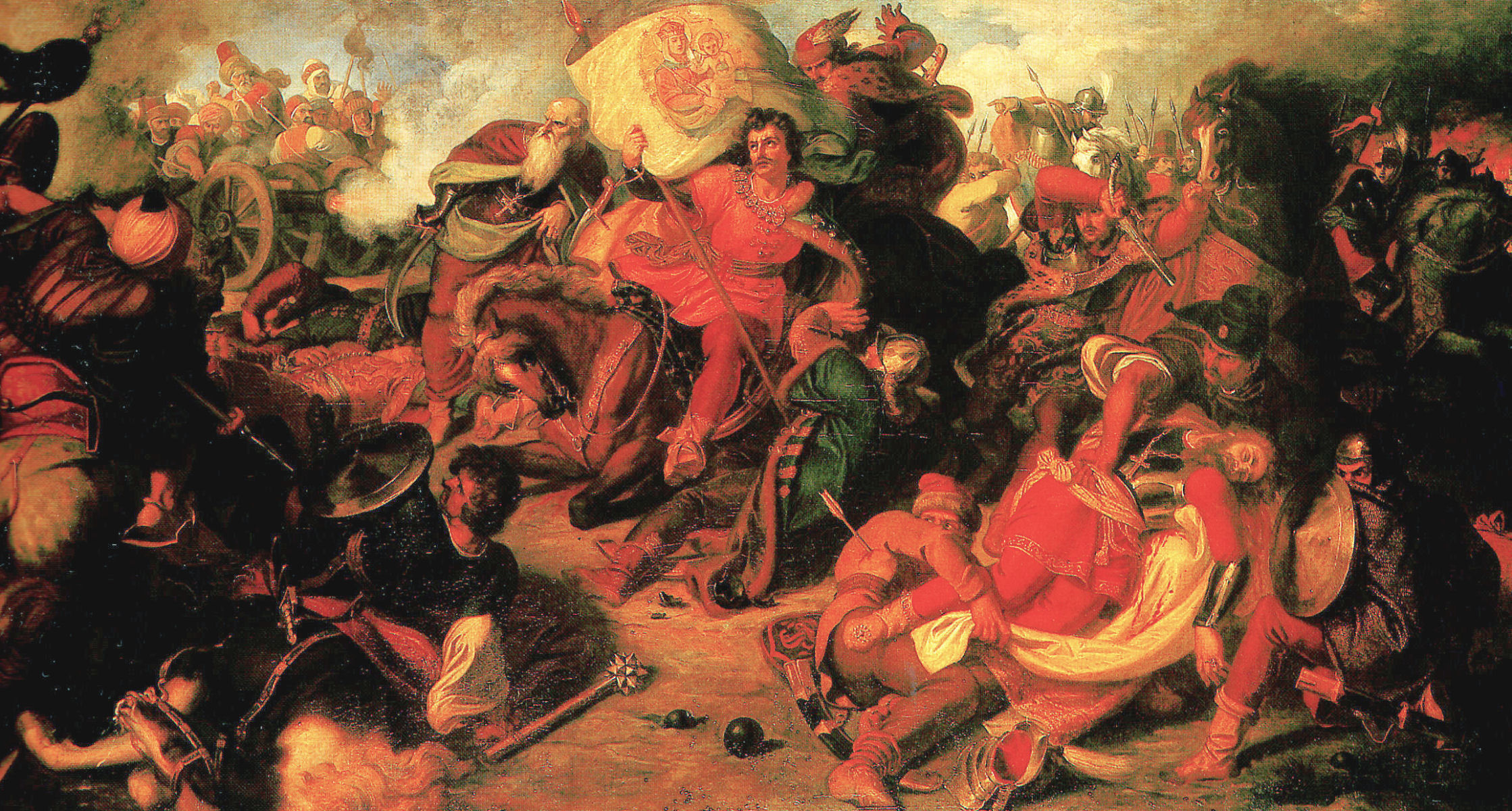
Battle of Mohács

He was relegated to the political life besides his brother. He was to engaged Elisabeth Corvinus, the daughter of John Corvinus, in 1504, but the last surviving member of the Hunyadi family died in 1508. He was commander of the Hungarian Royal Army, along with Archbishop of Kalocsa Pál Tomori, at the Battle of Mohács, where he disappeared and presumably died.

Court chaplain Miklós Tatai believed that Zápolya murdered King Louis II of Hungary, who escaped from the battle, in the house of the vicar in Dunaszekcső. Historians do not accept this report as credible.

== See also ==
- List of people who disappeared mysteriously (pre-1910)

== Bibliography ==
- Károly Kiss (ed.): Mohács emlékezete. Európa Könyvkiadó, Budapest 1979. 80–81. old. ISBN 963 07 14140
