= Kyselica =

Kyselica Keszölcés
- Municipality
- Flag

- Location of Kyselica in the Trnava Region Location of Kyselica in Slovakia
- Coordinates: 48.00°N 17.41°E
- Country: Slovakia
- Region: Trnava Region
- District: Dunajská Streda District
- First mentioned: 1296

Government
  - Mayor: Pál Hideghéti (Party of the Hungarian Coalition)

Area
  - Total: 3.49 km^{2} (1.35 sq mi)
- Elevation: 122 m (400 ft)

Population (2025)
  - Total: 290

Ethnicity
  - Hungarians: 78.86 %
  - Slovaks: 19.51 %
- Time zone: UTC+1 (CET)
  - Summer (DST): UTC+2 (CEST)
- Postal code: 930 30
- Area code: +421 31
- Vehicle registration plate (until 2022): DS
- Website: obeckyselica.sk

Kyselica (Hungarian: Keszölcés, pronounced [ˈkɛsøltseːʃ]) is a village and municipality in the Dunajská Streda District in the Trnava Region of south-west Slovakia.

== Geography ==
The municipality lies at an altitude of 122 metres (400 ft) and covers an area of 3.49 km^{2} (1.35 sq mi) (2025).

== History ==
The vineyard in Kyselica's territory was already mentioned in 1205, but the village itself was first recorded in 1296 when Andrew III of Hungary donated an estate to a certain Chunt.

Until the end of World War I, it was part of Hungary and fell within the Somorja district of Pozsony County. After the Austro-Hungarian army disintegrated in November 1918, Czechoslovak troops occupied the area. After the Treaty of Trianon of 1920, the village became officially part of Czechoslovakia. The village was actually cut into two by the new state border. The part remaining Hungarian territory became the village of Sérfenyősziget which is now part of Dunasziget. In November 1938, the First Vienna Award granted the area to Hungary and it was held by Hungary until 1945. In 1941, the village was administratively attached to Vojka. After Soviet occupation in 1945, Czechoslovak administration returned and the village became officially part of Czechoslovakia in 1947. After World War II, many Hungarian civilians from the village were deported. The construction of the Gabčíkovo waterworks hindered its development as half of the village was pulled down due to the construction works. The territory of the village was partitioned between Vojka nad Dunajom and Rohovce in 1988, but became an independent municipality again in 1993 following a referendum.

== Population ==
Population statistic (10 years)
Year	1995	2005	2015	2025
Count	122	146	155	290
Difference		+19.67%	+6.16%	+87.09%

Population statistic
Year	2024	2025
Count	270	290
Difference		+7.40%

Kyselica has a population of 290 people (31 December 2025).

=== Ethnicity ===
Census 2021 (1+ %)
Ethnicity	Number	Fraction
Hungarian	136	66.01%
Slovak	72	34.95%
Czech	3	1.45%
Total	206	

In year 2021 was 206 people by ethnicity 136 as Hungarian, 72 as Slovak, 3 as Czech, 2 as Not found out, 1 as Jewish, 1 as Ukrainian, 1 as Italian, 1 as Polish, 1 as German, 1 as Other and 1 as Croatian.

Note on population: The difference values of population numbers in the table "Population statistic" and in the sections "Ethnicity" & "Religion" is caused by the use of various statistical methods.

=== Religion ===
Census 2021 (1+ %)
Religion	Number	Fraction
Roman Catholic Church	132	64.08%
None	55	26.7%
Evangelical Church	7	3.4%
Calvinist Church	3	1.46%
Greek Catholic Church	3	1.46%
Total	206	

In year 2021 was 206 people by religion 132 from Roman Catholic Church, 55 from None, 7 from Evangelical Church, 3 from Calvinist Church, 3 from Greek Catholic Church, 1 from Jewish community, 1 from Eastern Orthodox Church, 1 from Jehovah's Witnesses, 1 from Not found out, 1 from Buddhism and 1 from Ad hoc movements.

In 1910, the village had 612, for the most part Hungarian, inhabitants.

At the 2001 Census the recorded population of the village was 123, while an end-2008 estimate by the Statistical Office had the village's population as 145. As of 2001, 78.86% of its population were Hungarians and 19.51% were Slovaks. Roman Catholicism is the majority religion of the village, its adherents numbering 95.12% of the total population.
