= John Hunyadi, Ban of Severin =

Hungarian noble

John Hunyadi
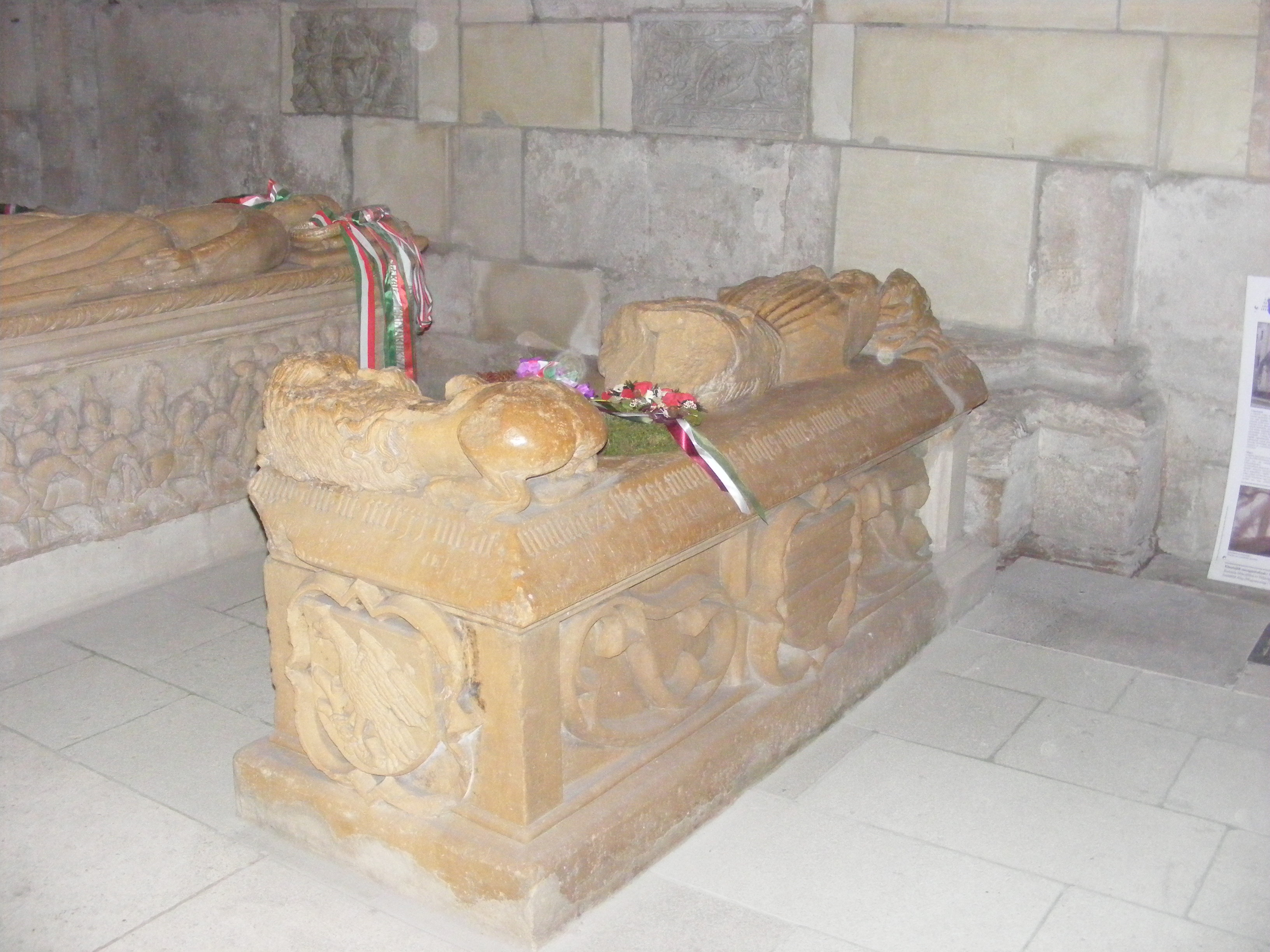
- Tomb of John Hunyadi, Jr. at St. Michael's Cathedral

Ban of Severin
- Reign: 1439–1440
- Predecessor: Franko Talovac
- Successor: John Hunyadi
- Born: c. 1419
- Died: 1440 or 1441
- Noble family: House of Hunyadi
- Father: Voyk
- Mother: Elizabeth Morzsinai
- Occupation: soldier

John Hunyadi, Jr. (c. 1419 – 1440 or 1441) was a Hungarian noble and knight banneret from the House of Hunyadi, younger brother of regent John Hunyadi as the second son of Vajk (Voyk) and Erzsébet (Elizabeth) Morzsinai (Morsina/Marsina).

There is little information about him. He was first mentioned in the charter issued for four members of his family on 12 February 1419. He was appointed Ban of Severin (Szörény) by King Albert in 1439, along with his brother. Thereafter he participated in his brother's early campaigns against the Ottomans. He was probably killed in a battle in this capacity in 1440 or 1441. He was buried in Gyulafehérvár (today: Alba Iulia, Romania). His brother wrote of him as "the valiant of the valiant", showing that John the younger was regarded a brave soldier.

== Sources ==
- Engel, Pál (1996). Magyarország világi archontológiája, 1301–1457, I. [Secular Archontology of Hungary, 1301–1457, Volume I] (in Hungarian). Budapest: História, MTA Történettudományi Intézete. ISBN 963-8312-44-0.
- Kubinyi, András (2008). Matthias Rex. Balassi Kiadó. ISBN 978-963-506-767-1.
- Pop, Ioan-Aurel (2005). "Transylvania in the 14th century and the first half of the 15th century (1300–1456)". In Pop, Ioan-Aurel; Nägler, Thomas (eds.). The History of Transylvania, Vol. I. (Until 1541). Romanian Cultural Institute (Center for Transylvanian Studies). pp. 247–298. ISBN 973-7784-00-6.
- Teke, Zsuzsa (1980). Hunyadi János és kora [John Hunyadi and his Times] (in Hungarian). Gondolat. ISBN 963-280-951-3.

John Hunyadi, Ban of Severin House of Hunyadi
Political offices
Preceded by Franko Talovac	Ban of Severin alongside John Hunyadi; 1439–1440	Succeeded by John Hunyadi
