= Vojka nad Dunajom =

Municipality in Trnava, Slovakia

Vojka nad Dunajom Vajka
- Municipality
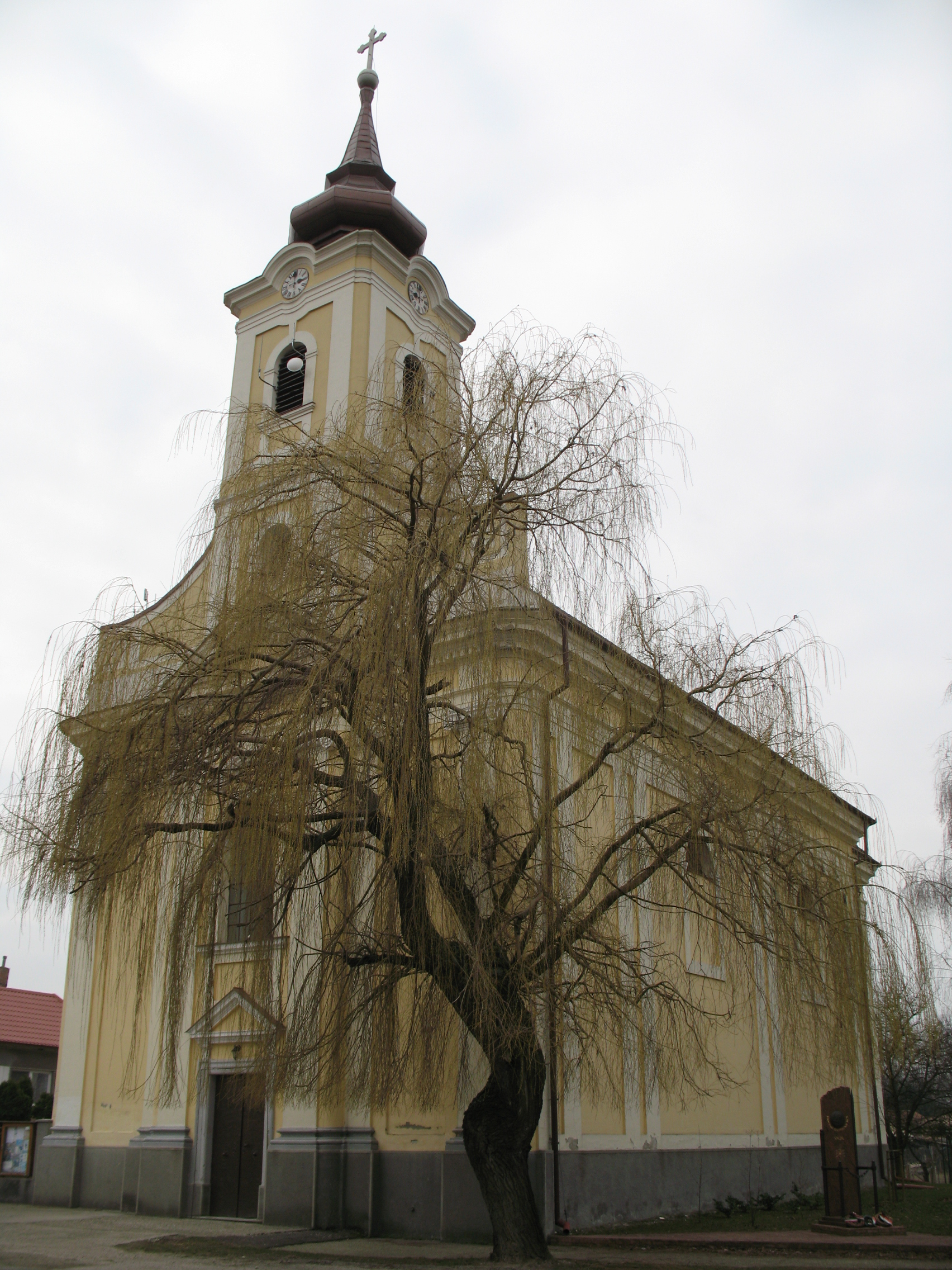

- Flag

- Location of Vojka nad Dunajom in the Trnava Region Location of Vojka nad Dunajom in Slovakia
- Coordinates: 47.97°N 17.38°E
- Country: Slovakia
- Region: Trnava Region
- District: Dunajská Streda District
- First mentioned: 1186

Government
  - Mayor: Donald Álló (Ind.)

Area
  - Total: 8.21 km^{2} (3.17 sq mi)
- Elevation: 122 m (400 ft)

Population (2025)
  - Total: 464

Ethnicity
  - Hungarians: 87.73%
  - Slovaks: 11.81%
- Time zone: UTC+1 (CET)
  - Summer (DST): UTC+2 (CEST)
- Postal code: 930 31
- Area code: +421 31
- Vehicle registration plate (until 2022): DS
- Website: www.vojkanaddunajom.sk

Vojka nad Dunajom (Hungarian: Vajka, pronounced [ˈvɒjkɒ]) is a village and municipality in the Dunajská Streda District in the Trnava Region of south-west Slovakia.

== History ==
In the 9th century, the territory of Vojka nad Dunajom became part of the Kingdom of Hungary. In historical records the village was first mentioned in 1186.

After the Austro-Hungarian army disintegrated in November 1918, Czechoslovak and French troops occupied the area, which despite the majority Hungarian populations of southern Slovakia, and without plebiscite, would later be annexed with the Treaty of Trianon in 1920. Between 1938 and 1945 Vojka nad Dunajom once more became part of Hungary through the First Vienna Award. From 1945 until the Velvet Divorce, it was part of Czechoslovakia. Since then it has been part of Slovakia. The town bears the name of Vajk, the pagan name of Stephen I of Hungary, first King of Hungary. In 2005, villagers erected a statue of the Saint in front of the local Catholic Church.

== Geography ==
The municipality lies at an altitude of 122 metres (400 ft) and covers an area of 8.21 km^{2} (3.17 sq mi) (2025).

It is situated on an island between the (old) Danube and the "new Danube", i.e. the Danube channel created by the Gabčíkovo–Nagymaros Dams.

== Population ==
Population statistic (10 years)
Year	1995	2005	2015	2025
Count	457	424	453	464
Difference		−7.22%	+6.83%	+2.42%

Population statistic
Year	2024	2025
Count	446	464
Difference		+4.03%

It has a population of 464 people (31 December 2025).

=== Ethnicity ===
Census 2021 (1+%)
Ethnicity	Number	Fraction
Hungarian	291	63.26%
Slovak	162	35.21%
Not found out	17	3.69%
Czech	9	1.95%
Total	460	

In year 2021 was 460 people by ethnicity 291 as Hungarian, 162 as Slovak, 17 as Not found out, 9 as Czech, 4 as Ukrainian, 1 as Russian, 1 as German and 1 as Other.

Note on population: The difference values of population numbers in the table "Population statistic" and in the sections "Ethnicity" & "Religion" is caused by the use of various statistical methods.

=== Religion ===
Census 2021 (1+%)
Religion	Number	Fraction
Roman Catholic Church	299	65%
None	118	25.65%
Not found out	14	3.04%
Evangelical Church	11	2.39%
Jehovah's Witnesses	10	2.17%
Total	460	

In year 2021 was 460 people by religion 299 from Roman Catholic Church, 118 from None, 14 from Not found out, 11 from Evangelical Church, 10 from Jehovah's Witnesses, 3 from Greek Catholic Church, 2 from Calvinist Church, 1 from Eastern Orthodox Church, 1 from Christian Congregations in Slovakia and 1 from Buddhism.
