= Barbara Edelpöck =

Royal mistress

Barbara Edelpöck (Hungarian: Edelpöck/Edelpeck Borbála; ? – 9 March 1495) was the mistress of Matthias Corvinus, King of Hungary. She gave birth to the King's only, although illegitimate, child, John Corvinus.

== Life ==
Barbara Edelpöck was a daughter of Hans Edelpöck, a citizen of Stein (now Krems an der Donau) in Lower Austria. Matthias Corvinus King of Hungary and Bohemia met Barbara Edelpöck during the 1470 Vienna Summit, where Frederick III, Holy Roman Emperor organized dance parties. Matthias took her with him to Buda. On 2 April 2 1473, their child, John Corvinus was born in Buda, whom Barbara began to raise in Besztercebánya in a house given by King Matthias until 1476. In 1476, Matthias married Beatrice of Aragon, and after they had no children, in 1479 he recognized John Corvinus as his legitimate son.

Barbara Edelpöck married Friedrich von Enzersdorf in 1476, with whom she had two more children (which was revealed in her will, but their names are not known) and they lived in a castle bought by Matthias in Enzersdorf in Lower Austria. Barbara died in Klosterneuburg in Lower Austria in 9 March 1495.

== Sources ==
- E. Kovács, Péter (1990). Matthias Corvinus (in Hungarian). Officina Nova. ISBN 963-7835-49-0.
- Kubinyi, András (2008). Matthias Rex. Balassi Kiadó. ISBN 978-963-506-767-1.
- Tanner, Marcus (2009). The Raven King: Matthias Corvinus and the Fate of his Lost Library. Yale University Press. ISBN 978-0-300-15828-1.
