= Beatrice de Frangepan =

Croatian noblewoman (1480–1510)

- Kneginja (Princess); Margravine of Brandenburg-Ansbach
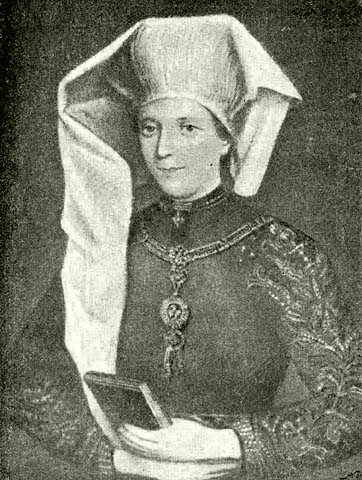
- Born: 1480; Croatia
- Died: c. 27 March 1510; Gyula, Kingdom of Hungary
- Spouses: John Corvinus (m. 1496; died 1504) George, Margrave of Brandenburg-Ansbach (m. 1509)
- Issue: Elisabeth Corvinus; Christopher Corvinus; Matthias Corvinus
- Father: Bernardin Frankopan
- Mother: Luisa Marzano d'Aragona

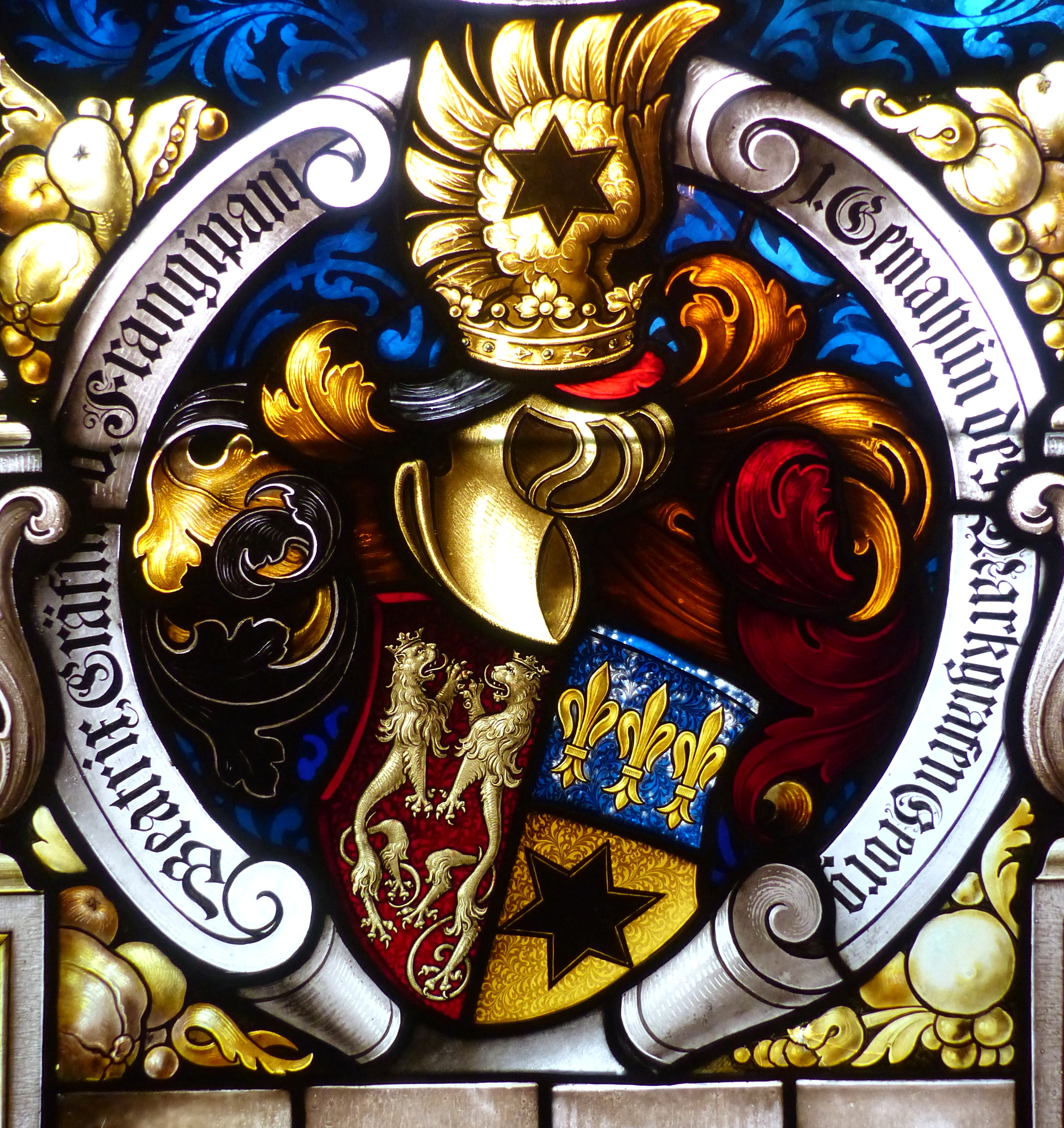

Beatrice de Frangepan (Croatian: Beatrica Frankopan, Hungarian: Frangepán Beatrix; 1480 – c. 27 March 1510) was a Croatian noblewoman, a member of the House of Frankopan that lived in the Kingdom of Croatia in personal union with Hungary. By marriage she was heiress of Hunyad Castle and Margravine of Brandenburg-Ansbach.

== Life ==
Beatrice de Frangepan was a Croatian noblewoman, daughter of Bernardin Frankopan, Knez of Krk and Modruš, and Luisa Marzano d'Aragona. Her brother, Christoph Frankopan, served as Ban of Croatia under King John Zápolya.

In 1496, she married John Corvinus, illegitimate son of King Matthias Corvinus of Hungary, and had three children: Elisabeth (1496–1508), Christopher (1499–1505), and Matthias (1504–1505). After John’s death, she inherited Hunyad Castle and managed the estates, but her children died young.

In 1509, she married George, Margrave of Brandenburg-Ansbach in Gyula, Hungary. King Vladislaus II of Hungary transferred the Corvinus estates to George, including Hunyad Castle and the fortress of Lipova with 252 villages. Parts of the Bibliotheca Corviniana also ended up in Wolfenbüttel.

Beatrice died in 1510, a year after her second marriage. George subsequently sold most of the Hungarian estates and purchased several Silesian duchies.

== Personal life and legacy ==
Beatrice is remembered for her role in administering the Corvinus estates after the death of her first husband, preserving important Hungarian properties and cultural heritage. Through her marriages, she linked the Croatian Frankopan family with the Hungarian royal lineage and the German Hohenzollerns. Parts of the Bibliotheca Corviniana—a significant Renaissance library—were transferred to Wolfenbüttel because of her estates. Her brief life and strategic marriages illustrate the political alliances and land inheritance practices of Central European nobility in the early 16th century.

== See also ==
- History of Hungary
- Matthias Corvinus
