= Elisabeth Corvinus =

Hungarian princess (1496–1508)

Elisabeth Corvinus or Elisabeth Hunyadi (21 December 1496 – Gyula, Hungary, 1508) was the Princess of Hungary and the last surviving member of the Hungarian Royal House of Hunyadi.

== Life ==
Her father was János Corvinus, an illegitimate son of King Matthias I. Her mother was Beatrice de Frangepan, who was from a famous Croatian noble family, the Frankopans. Her brother, Christopher, was the last male member of the Royal House of Hunyadi.

Her father died in 1504, followed by the death of Christopher in 1505, who died without issue - thus extinguishing the male line of the royal house.

With her brother's death, young Elisabeth was now sole heir to the immense estates of the Hunyadi. Shortly thereafter, in 1505, she was betrothed to George, the younger son of the Duchess of Teschen. The marriage never took place, prevented by Elisabeth's death in 1508.

Elisabeth also died without issue, and the extinction of the Royal House became total.

== Bibliography ==
- Schönherr, Gyula: Hunyadi Corvin János (János Corvinus Hunyadi), Franklin-Társulat, Budapest, 1894 URL: See External links
