= Vajk (given name) =

Male given name

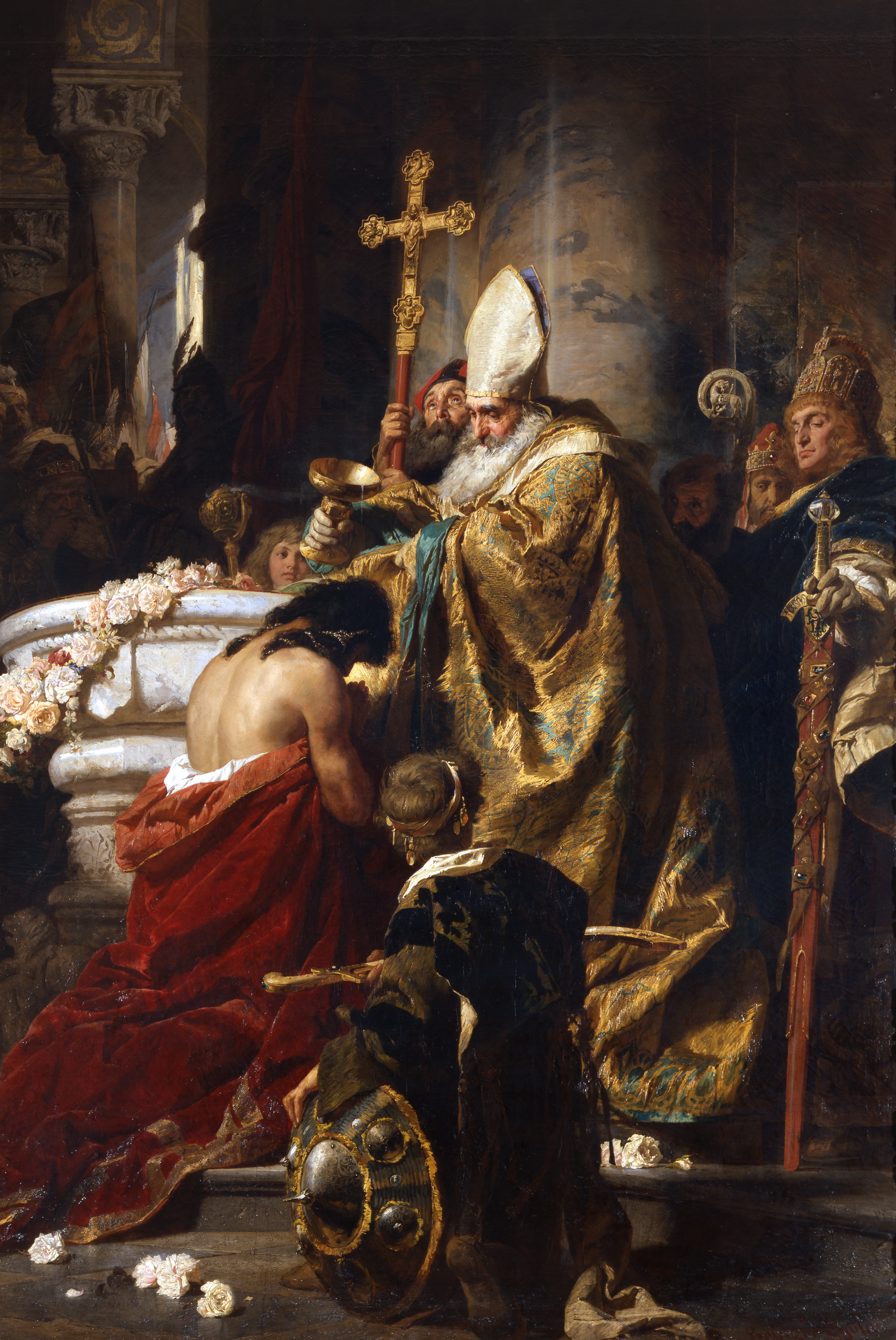
- Gyula Benczúr's painting: Baptism of Vajk by Adalbert of Prague
- Gender: Male

Origin
- Origin: Hungarian and Turkic
- Meaning: "True man"

Vajk, Voyk or Vojk (alternatively spelled Vayk in English, Voicu in Romanian) is an Old Hungarian masculine first name possibly derived from the Turkic Bajik (or Bajiq or Bayk) which means "True Man" or "rich, powerful". Tatars used the name 'Bayk' till the 18th century.

== Famous Vajks in history ==
- Stephen I of Hungary, Grand Prince of the Hungarians (997-1001) and the first King of Hungary (1001-1038) was given the birth name Vajk.
- The father of captain-general (1444–1446) and regent (1446–1453) of the Kingdom of Hungary John Hunyadi, who was a Voivode of Transylvania (from 1441), was named Voyk, a variation of 'Vajk'.
