= John Corvinus =

Illegitimate son of Matthias Corvinus (1473–1504)

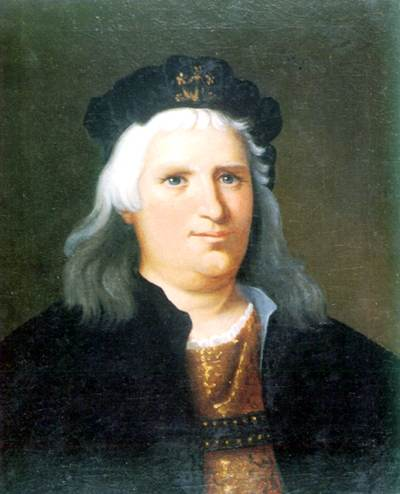
- Portrait by Imre Madách.

Ban of Croatia
- Reign: 1495–1498
- Reign: 1499–1504
- Born: 2 April 1473; Buda, Kingdom of Hungary
- Died: 12 October 1504 (aged 31); Krapina, Croatia
- Burial: Lepoglava
- Spouse: Beatrice de Frangepan
- Issue: Elisabeth; Christopher; Matthias
- House: Hunyadi
- Father: Matthias Corvinus
- Mother: Barbara Edelpöck
- Religion: Roman Catholicism
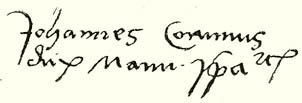
- Signature

John Corvinus (Hungarian: Corvin János, Croatian: Ivaniš Korvin, Romanian: Ioan Corvin; 2 April 1473 – 12 October 1504) was the illegitimate son of Matthias Corvinus, King of Hungary, and his mistress, Barbara Edelpöck.

== Biography ==
=== Early life ===
Born in Buda, he took his name from the raven (Latin: corvus) in his father's escutcheon. Matthias originally intended him for the Church, but on losing all hope of offspring from his queen, Beatrice of Naples, determined, towards the end of his life, to make the youth his successor on the throne. He loaded him with honours and riches until he was by far the wealthiest magnate in the land. He publicly declared him his successor, created him a prince with vast apanages in Silesia (Duchy of Głogów) made the commandants of all the fortresses in the kingdom take an oath of allegiance to him, and tried to arrange a marriage for him with Bianca Maria Sforza of Milan, a project which was frustrated by the intrigues of Queen Beatrice.

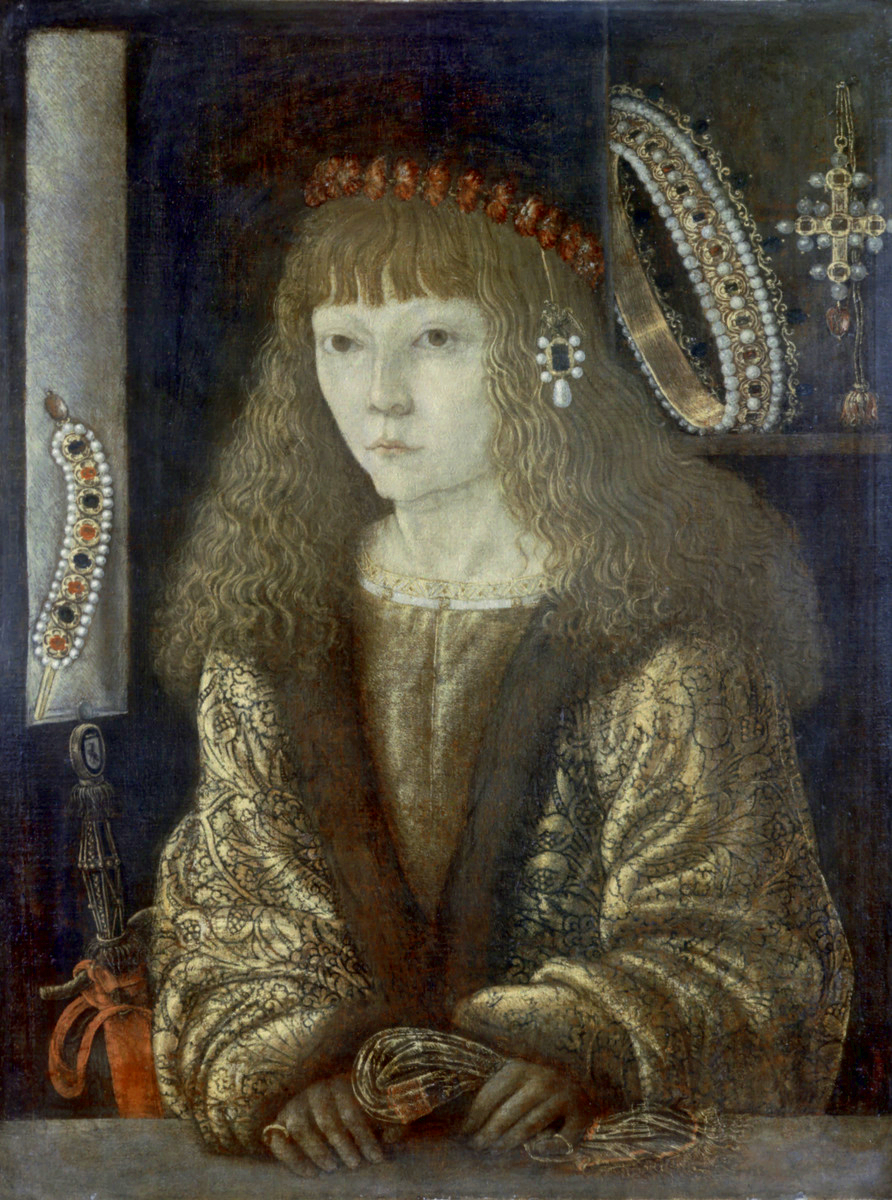
A young John Corvinus in 1486, by Baldassare Estense.

Matthias also intended to make the recognition of John as Prince Royal of Hungary by Holy Roman Emperor Frederick III, in counterpart of relinquishing all or part of the conquered hereditary domains of the House of Habsburg; but his sudden death left the matter still pending, and the young prince suddenly found himself alone in the midst of enemies.

=== After Matthias's death ===
The inexperienced and irresolute youth speedily became the victim of the most shameful chicanery. He was first induced formally to resign his claims to the throne, on the understanding that he was to be compensated with the crown of Bosnia. He was then persuaded to retire southwards with the royal treasures which Matthias had confided to him, whereupon an army immediately started in pursuit, scattered his forces in the battle of Bonefield (July 4, 1490, near Kölesd in Tolna county), and robbed him of everything.

Meanwhile, the diet had elected Vladislaus Jagiellon of Bohemia King (15 July 1490), to whom John hastened to do homage, in order to save something from the wreck of his fortunes. He was also recognized as duke of Slavonia and Opava, but compelled to relinquish both titles five years later. On the invasion of Hungary by Maximilian, he showed his loyalty to the crown by relinquishing into the hands of Vladislaus the three important fortresses in Pressburg (present day Bratislava in Slovakia), Komárom and Tata, which had been entrusted to him by his father. But now, encouraged by his complacency, the chief dignitaries, headed by the Palatine Stephen Zápolya (? – 1499), laid claim to nearly all his remaining estates and involved him in a whole series of costly processes. This they could do with perfect impunity, as they had poisoned the mind of the indolent and suspicious king against their victim.

=== Marriage and issue ===
In 1496 Corvinus married Beatrice Frangepán, the daughter of Bernard Frangepán and Lujza Marzano d'Aragona (b.1455). His prospects now improved, and in 1498 he was created perpetual Ban of Croatia and Slavonia. From 1499 to 1502 he successfully defended the unconquered parts of Bosnia against the Turks, and in the following year aspired to the dignity of Palatine, but was defeated by a combination of Queen Beatrice and his other enemies. He died at Krapina on 12 October 1504, leaving two sons, Christopher, (1499 - 17 March 1505), and Matthias (1504-1505), and a daughter, Elisabeth (1496-1508).

== Genetics ==
Bone samples were collected in the Corvinus grave from the remains of John Corvinus and Christopher Corvinus in the church of the Blessed Virgin Mary in Lepoglava by the Institute of Hungarian Research in 2021 to define their genetic composition. The team of Endre Neparáczki successfully identified the whole genome sequences of the last two male members of the Hunyadi family by next-generation sequencing technology, and the genetic study was published in Heliyon in 2022.

== Ancestry ==
Ancestors of John Corvinus

16. Serbe ?
8. Voyk Hunyadi
4. John Hunyadi
9. Elisabeth Morzsinai
2. Matthias Corvinus
20. Miklós Szilágyi
10. Ladislaus Szilágyi
5. Erzsébet Szilágyi
22. István Bellén
11. Catherina Bellyéni
1. John Corvinus
6. Hans Edelpöck, citizen of Stein (now Krems an der Donau) in Lower Austria
3. Barbara Edelpöck

== Sources ==
- This work in turn cites:
  - Schönherr, Gyula. Hunyadi Corvin János: 1473-1504. Budapest: Magyar Történelmi Társulat, 1894. (MEK) URL: Lásd külső hivatkozások (in Hungarian)* Kubinyi, András (2008). Matthias Rex. Budapest. ISBN 978-963-506-767-1. OCLC 236054839.
- Mureșanu, Camil (2001). John Hunyadi: Defender of Christendom. Iași: Center for Romanian Studies. ISBN 973-9432-18-2. OCLC 45327384.
- Neparáczki, Endre; Kis, Luca; Maróti, Zoltán; Kovács, Bence; Varga, Gergely I.B.; Makoldi, Miklós; Horolma, Pamjav; Éva Teiszler; Tihanyi, Balázs; Nagy, Péter L.; Maár, Kitti; Gyenesei, Attila; Schütz, Oszkár; Dudás, Eszter; Török, Tibor; Pascuttini-Juraga, Vesna; Peharda, Ivančica; Vizi, László Tamás; Horváth-Lugossy, Gábor; Kásler, Miklós (2022). "The genetic legacy of the Hunyadi descendants". Heliyon. 8 (11) e11731. Bibcode:2022Heliy...811731N. doi:10.1016/j.heliyon.2022.e11731. PMC 9678726. PMID 36425424.
