= Pál Tomori =

Catholic monk and archbishop of Kalocsa, Hungary

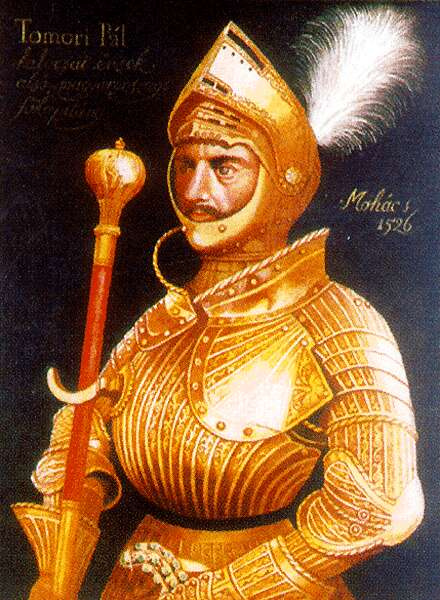
Paul Tomori

Pál Tomori (c. 1475 – 29 August 1526) was a Catholic monk and archbishop of Kalocsa, Hungary. He defeated an Ottoman army near Sremska Mitrovica (Hungarian: Szávaszentdemeter-Nagyolaszi) in 1523.

Pál Tomori was commander-in-chief of the Hungarian army several times, and in that capacity was killed in action during the battle of Mohács on the 29th of August 1526.

== Life ==
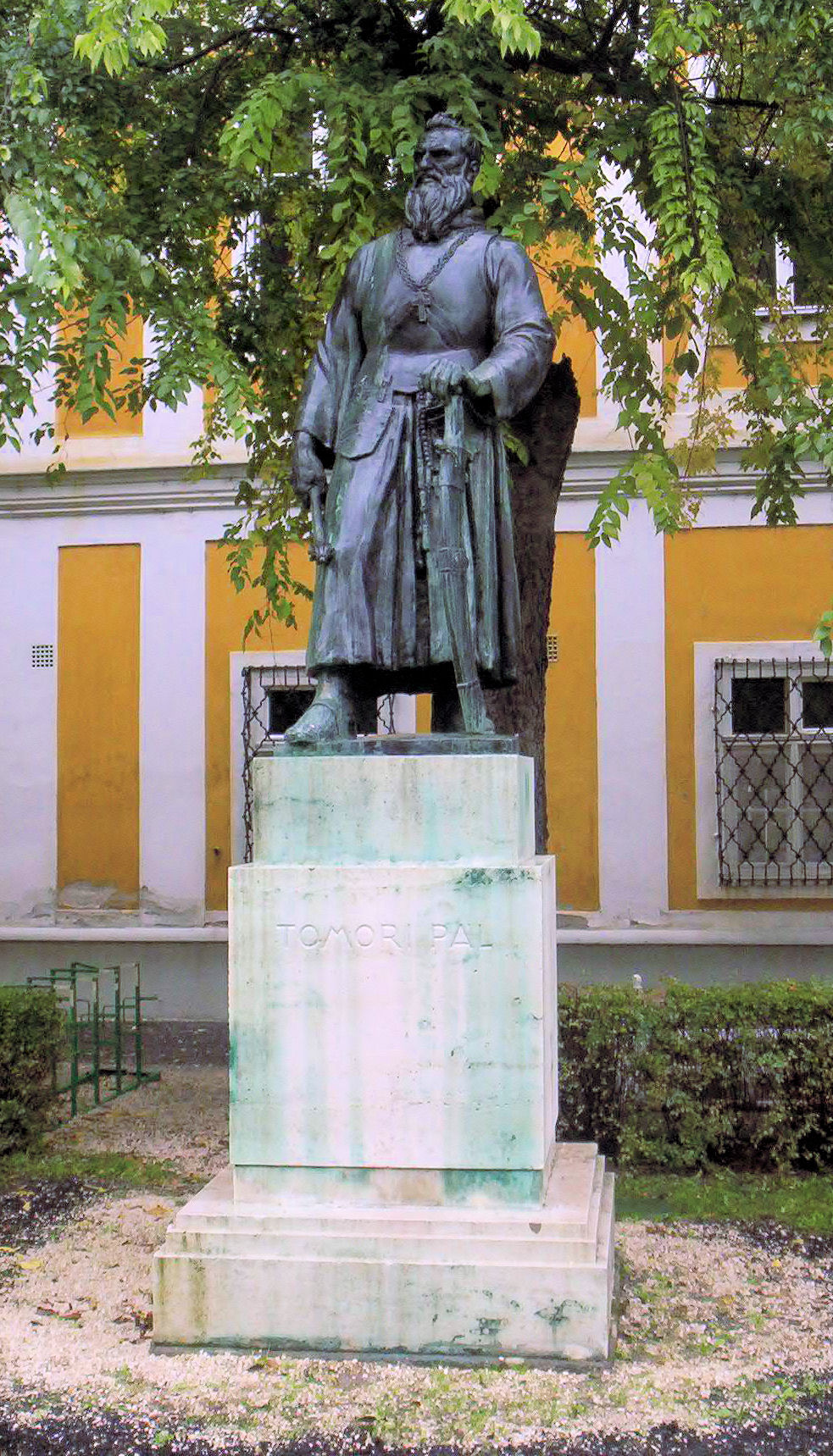
Tomori's romantic statue in Kalocsa

Tomori was born into a common family in Abaúj County. He began his military career serving the noble family of János Bornemisza. In Transylvania he was a Curian clerk, treasury official, and ispán of the Salt Chamber. Tomori was appointed steward of the castles in Fogaras (present-day Făgăraș) and Munkács (present-day Mukachevo) in 1505.

In that capacity, he contributed to the suppression of the Szekler uprising that broke out due to a tax called the ox roasting in 1506. In February 1512 Tomori attended the Turkish court as Ulászló's ambassador. At the end of July 1514, during the Hungarian Peasant War of 1514 and after György Dózsa had laid down his arms, János Szapolyai sent Tomori against the peasant army besieging the city of Bihor. He defeated the insurgents and their leader, and also captured Lőrinc Mészáros, thus ending the war.

In 1518, Tomori was appointed captain of the castle in Buda. In May 1519, he suppressed a peasant rebellion during the palatine election parliament. In the middle of 1520, however, he distributed his wealth among his relatives, entered the Order of Friars Minor (the Observant Franciscans) and went into the convent of Esztergom. His reasons are unknown; it might have been caused by the death of his fiancée or newly-wed wife. [2]

Tomori was known as a good soldier, so in 1521, at the outbreak of the Turkish-Hungarian war, many saw in him a warlord who would be able to lead the Hungarian armies. According to a report from the Buda administration, the Hungarians did not have experienced warlords because of a long period of peace and tranquility. Some military units along the border fought permanently, or at least regularly, but most of the nobility lived far away from the region under threat from the Ottomans. Their lack of training and experience meant that amongst them, only Pál Tomori was skilled in the craft of warfare. However, despite encouragement, Tomori did not want to return to a secular career.

Finally, at the request of Hungary, on February 4, 1523, Pope Adrian VI forced him to accept the archdiocese of Kalocsa, and then in April the Assembly of the Estates hastily entrusted him - according to contemporary reporting - with "the country's lieutenancy, and the captaincy of the entire Great Plain". Tomori complied with the instructions of the pope and the Assembly and thus became the organizer and military leader of the defense against the Turks.

During its three years of military operations in the South, the army had earned extensive experience in protecting Hungarian borders. Tomori arrived at his station in Pétervárad (present-day Petrovaradin) in July 1523, and by August he had to fight the Bosnian pasha Ferhád, who besieged the castle of Red in Szerém (Syrmia) with a force of about 12,000 soldiers. On August 6 and 7 of 1523, Hungarian troops won a decisive victory over Ferhád's army in three battles in the Nagyolaszi-Rednek-Szávaszentdemeter triangle.

This was the only significant Hungarian victory in the Hungarian-Turkish war of 1521–26. Over the next year and a half, Tomori sought to strengthen the southern border fortress system, especially the one in Szerém. Relying on these castles, he repulsed the increasing frequency of Turkish invasions. By 1525, he had stabilized the situation so effectively that he was able to break into Turkish territory as well. A larger campaign of counterattack was out of the question, however, because he received very little support from the Hungarian Treasury and the Hungarian lords. The diocese of Tomori spent all its income on defense and also received papal support, but this proved to be insufficient for a full campaign.

In 1526, Tomori corresponded with the papal representative, detailing the failing Hungarian defenses and the pressing Ottoman threat. To make the court and the lords aware of the danger, he repeatedly threatened to resign, and then, on 12 January 1526, actually submitting his resignation and beginning (apparently successful) negotiations with the Turkish ambassador in Buda.

However, Suleiman the Magnificent then decided to launch yet another campaign against Hungary, so Tomori withdrew his resignation and returned to his station. Pál Tomori and György Szapolyai were elected joint commanders-in-chief of the Hungarian army. Tomori's plan was to try to stop the Turkish army on the Drava line with an army of about 6,000. On the 24th of August 1526, he defeated a Turkish army, but the military council ordered him to join his forces to the Hungarian main body.

Tomori opposed the decision, but complied. He was killed during the ensuing battle of Mohács on the 29th of August 1526, reportedly while trying to prevent Hungarian troops from breaking formation and fleeing.

== Legends ==
Many legends and stories exist about him. These include that his wife was killed, causing him to become a monk, and that he only became archbishop due to the pressure of his king, but refused to wear anything but his armour and the monk's cowl.
