= Bulgari (surname) =

Bulgari is a surname. Notable people with the surname include:

- Beatrice Bulgari, Italian costume designer
- Gianni Bulgari (born 1935), Italian jewelry designer and businessman
- Giorgio Bulgari (1890–1966), Italian businessman
- Nicola Bulgari (born 1941), Italian businessman
- Paolo Bulgari (1937–2026), Italian businessman
- Sotirio Bulgari (Sotirios Voulgaris) (1857–1932), founder of the Bulgari luxury fashion house

== See also ==
- Voulgaris, the equivalent surname in Greek
- Bulgari (disambiguation)
