= Bulgaria (disambiguation) =

Bulgaria is a country in Europe and a member state of the European Union.

Bulgaria may also refer to:

== Places ==
- Old Great Bulgaria or Great Bulgaria, a historical country just northeast of the Black Sea
- First Bulgarian Empire
- Second Bulgarian Empire
- Principality of Bulgaria
- Kingdom of Bulgaria
- People's Republic of Bulgaria, a former socialist state that existed from 1946-1990
- Volga Bulgaria, a historical country on the river Volga
- Bulgaria (theme), a Byzantine administrative unit
- Bulgaria, Cluj-Napoca, a district of Cluj-Napoca, Romania
- Bulgaria, an outdated toponym encompassing the region of Moesia, i.e. the Vilayet of the Danube, called by the Ottomans Bulgaristan (Bulgaria)

== Ships ==
- Bulgaria (1955 ship), a Russian ship that sank in the Volga
- SS Bulgaria (1898), a liner in service 1898–1917
- SS Bulgaria (1945), a cargo ship in service 1948–76

== Other ==
- Bulgaria (European Parliament constituency)
- Bulgaria (fungus), a genus of fungi
- 2575 Bulgaria, asteroid
- Bulgaria national football team, the national football (soccer) team of Bulgaria
- Great Uncle Bulgaria, a character in The Wombles

== See also ==
- Bogoria (disambiguation)
- SS Bulgaria, a list of ships
- Category:National sports teams of Bulgaria for teams called "Bulgaria"
- Bulgari (disambiguation)
