= Giorgio Bulgari (jeweler) =

Bulgari entrepreneur

- Born: 1977 (age 48–49); New York City, US
- Occupations: Businessman, jeweler
- Father: Gianni Bulgari
- Relatives: Lia Bulgari (aunt); Paolo Bulgari (uncle); Nicola Bulgari (uncle); Beatrice Bulgari (aunt-in-law); Francesco Trapani (cousin); Giorgio Bulgari (grandfather); Sotirios Bulgari (great-grandfather)

Giorgio Bulgari (born 1977) is an Italian American businessman and a member of the Bulgari family of jewelers.

== Early life and career ==
Bulgari was born in New York City and raised in Rome. He is the great-grandson of Sotirio Bulgari, founder of the jewelry and luxury goods brand Bulgari and son of Gianni Bulgari.

Bulgari was a creative director of the Italian jewelry house Marina B, founded by his aunt Marina Bulgari. Prior to joining Marina B, Bulgari had been a consultant for Italian luxury goods company Salvatore Ferragamo, and spent more than a decade as managing director of the jewelry and watch business ENIGMA founded by his father.

In June 2017, Bulgari founded a jewelry company Giorgio Bulgari SA in Geneva, Switzerland.

In July 2020, Bulgari launched the premium ice-cream brand ‘Crema’ in Milan.

He is married and has two children.
