= Bulgari (disambiguation) =

Bulgari is an Italian luxury brand.

Bulgari may also refer to:

== People ==
- Bulgari (surname), including a list of people with the surname
- BULGARI, a pseudonym for Bulgarian musician Bogdan Irkük

== Places ==
- Bulgari, a village in the Romanian commune of Sălățig

== Other uses ==
- Bulgari (tribe), a Turkic people of the 7th century
- Bulgari (instrument), a Turkish string instrument
- Bulgari Hotel and Residences, a luxury hotel in London

== See also ==
- Voulgaris (surname), a Greek surname
- Bulgar (disambiguation)
- Bulgaria (disambiguation)
