= Trapani (surname) =

Trapani is a surname. Notable people with the surname include:

- Enzo Trapani (1922–1989), Italian screenwriter, set designer, television producer/director and film director
- Francesco Trapani (1957–2025), Italian chief executive
- Gina Trapani (born 1975), American tech blogger, web developer and writer
- Joe Trapani (born 1988), American basketball player
- Sal Trapani (1927–1999), American comic-book artist
