= SS Vindeggen =

A number of steamships were named Vindeggen, including –

- SS Vindeggen (1895), a cargo ship in service 1915–16
- SS Vindeggen (1916), a cargo ship in service 1917–18
- SS Vindeggen (1921), a cargo ship in service 1921–31
- SS Vindeggen (1945), a cargo ship in service 1946–48

See also

- MV Vindeggen, as cargo ship in service 1948–52
