= SS Bulgaria =

A number of steamships were named Bulgaria, including:

- SS Bulgaria (1898), a 10,237 GRT liner in service 1898–1917
- SS Bulgaria (1945), a 4,191 GRT cargo ship in service 1948–76
