= Ultracity =

Swedish dance music duo

Background information
- Origin: Stockholm, Sweden
- Genres: Disco; House; Italo; Electro
- Occupations: Record producer, musician, disc jockey
- Years active: 2007–present
- Labels: Rollerboys Recordings
- Website: http://www.myspace.com/theultracity

Ultracity is a Swedish dance music duo, consisting of Yourhighness and Elias Raam. They also run Rollerboys Recordings with Måns Ericson. Elias Raam is also a part of duo Arken, released on Sonar Kollektiv.

== Discography ==
Discography from Discogs

=== Releases ===
- Swetalic EP (Rollerboys Recordings, 2007)
- Klee (Epic Disco Vol. 1) (Rollerboys Recordings, 2009)

=== Remixes ===
- Pallers "Humdrum" (Humdrum EP) (Labrador, 2008)
- Jens Lekman "Sipping on the Sweet Nectar" (Service/Rollerboys Recordings, 2008)
- Bogdan Irkük a.k.a. BULGARI "Jewel of the Black Sea" (The Coastal EP) (Rollerboys Recordings, 2008)

=== Compilations ===
- Second Royal Vol.4 "Klee" (Second Royal, 2008)
