= Rollerboys Recordings =

- Founded: 2007
- Founder: Yourhighness, Elias Raam, Måns Ericson
- Distributor(s): Clone (NL)
- Genre: Disco; House; Electro; Italo
- Country of origin: Sweden
- Location: Stockholm
- Official website: Official site

Rollerboys Recordings is a Swedish independent record label founded by Yourhighness, Elias Raam and Måns Ericson. Rollerboys Recordings originated from Club Rollerboys, and started releasing records in 2007 with Bogdan Irkük a.k.a. BULGARI's "The Distant EP".

The label's focus is on modern disco music, a multi-faceted output ranging from electro to house to italo. All releases to date have been approved by the Swedish Epic Disco Association (S.E.D.A.).

The releases have received wide critical acclaim, and have been licensed to a multitude of compilations.

== Discography ==
Discography from Discogs

Release	Title	Artist	Format	Year
RR 001	The Distant EP	Bogdan Irkük a.k.a. BULGARI	12", EP	2007
RR 002	Swetalic EP	Ultracity	12", EP	2007
RR 003	The Coastal EP	Bogdan Irkük a.k.a. BULGARI	12", EP	2008
RR 004	Sipping On The Sweet Nectar - The Epic Remixes	Jens Lekman - Remixed by Ultracity, Bogdan Irkük a.k.a. BULGARI	12"	2008
RR 005	Epic Disco Vol. 1	Ilya Santana, Motorcycle Boy & Fabrizio Mammarella, Ultracity, Bogdan Irkük a.k.a. BULGARI	12"	2009

== Compilations ==
- Future Disco "Motorcycle Theme (Fabrizio Mammarella Edit)" - Motorcycle Boy (Azuli, 2009)
- Second Royal Vol. 4 "Klee" - Ultracity (2009)
- Nu Balearica by Fred Deakin "Space Reflecting On The Bosporos" - Bogdan Irkük a.k.a. BULGARI (Ministry Of Sound, 2008)
- Body Language Vol.5 by Chateau Flight "The Distant Message(Arken Remix)" - Bogdan Irkük a.k.a. BULGARI (Get Physical, 2007)

== Artists ==
- Ultracity
- Bogdan Irkük a.k.a. BULGARI
- Ilya Santana
- Motorcycle Boy
- Fabrizio Mammarella
