= Bulgari Hotel and Residences =

Luxury hotel in Knightsbridge, London

Coordinates: 51.5015°N 0.1629°W

Bulgari London
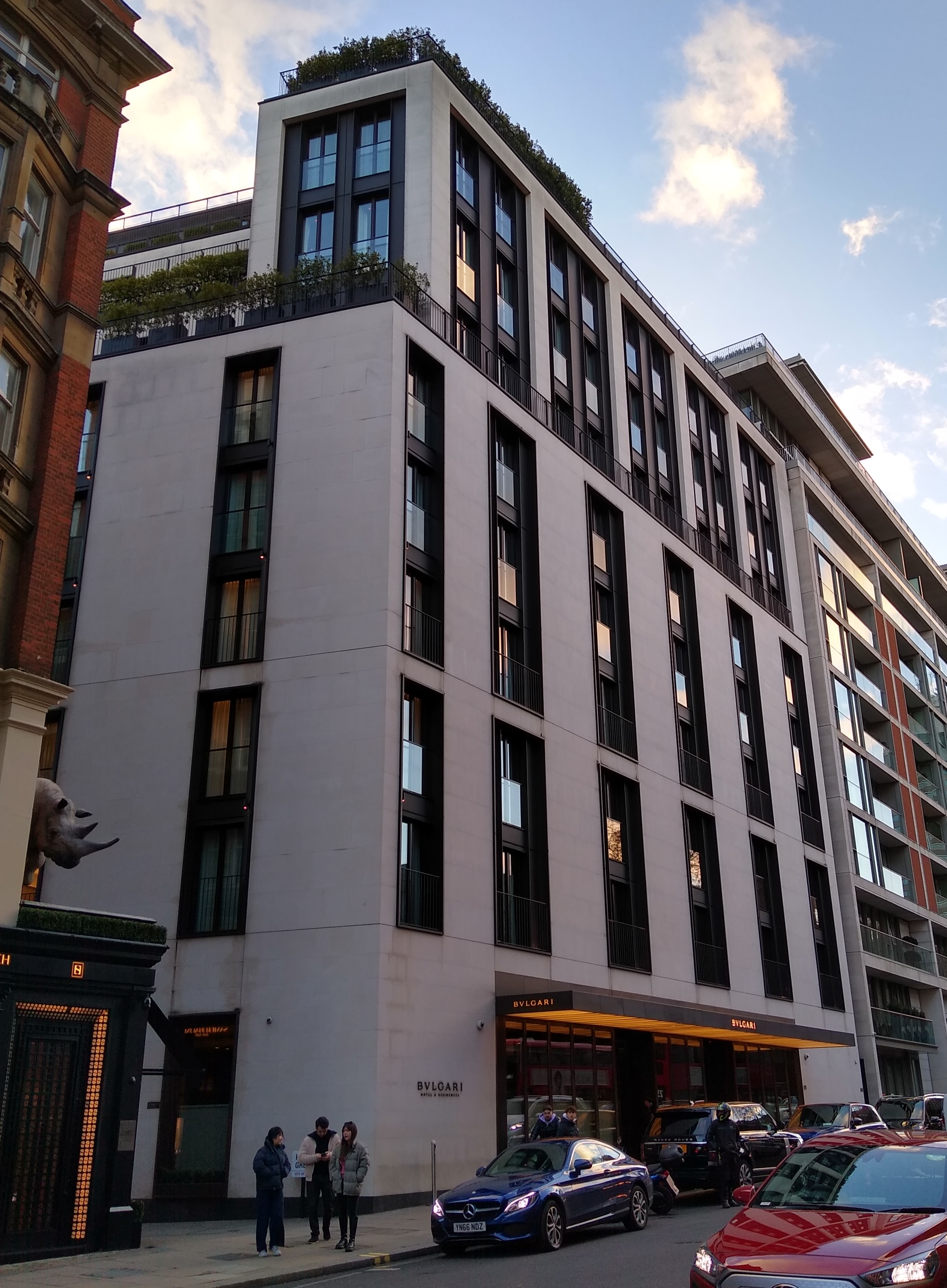
- Interactive map of the Bulgari London area
- Hotel chain: Bulgari

General information
- Location: Knightsbridge, London
- Opening: 2012
- Owner: Marriott International, Inc.

Technical details
- Floor count: 10

Design and construction
- Developer: Sir Robert McAlpine

Other information
- Number of rooms: 85

The Bulgari Hotels is a luxury hotel chain with 9 hotels in Milan, Bali, London, Dubai, Beijing, Shanghai, Tokyo, Rome and Paris. When it opened its third hotel Bulgari London in 2012, it was the most expensive hotel in London, and the penthouse apartment sold for $157 million.

== Locations ==
Hotel Name	Hotel Location	Country	Opening Year
Bulgari Hotel Beijing	Beijing	China	2017
Bulgari Hotel London	London	United Kingdom	2012
Bulgari Hotel Milano	Milan	Italy	2004
Bulgari Hotel Paris	Paris	France	2021
Bulgari Hotel Roma	Rome	Italy	2023
Bulgari Hotel Shanghai	Shanghai	China	2018
Bulgari Hotel Tokyo	Tokyo	Japan	2023
Bulgari Resort Bali	Bali	Indonesia	2006
Bulgari Resort Dubai	Dubai	United Arab Emirates	2017

== History ==
The hotel was built by Sir Robert McAlpine from 2010 to 2012, in place of the former Normandie Hotel. It was dedicated in May 2012. It was designed by Antonio Citterio, Patricia Viel & Partners. It was built with Portland stones. There are ten floors up and six underground floors.

There are 85 rooms and suites. All the rooms are designed in the same manner. The main thematic design is silver. The ballroom, which has a silver chandelier, can be rented for wedding receptions. It is "eco-friendly"; for example, the rainwater is recycled for the toilets. There is also a garden on the roof, or "green roof", with bat boxes.

In 2013, it signed a two-year contract with the Royal Albert Hall to be referred to visitors as its preferred luxury hotel.

In 2017, Bulgari London Hotel Private Screening Room was named as one of the top private screening rooms in London by Ikon London Magazine.

== Marriott Bonvoy points ==
Although operated by The Marriott International, Bulgari hotels and resorts do not participate in the Marriott Bonvoy loyalty program, meaning guests can neither earn nor redeem points for free bookings. It is currently the only Marriott brand to practice this policy, following the inclusion of The Ritz-Carlton Reserve properties to the program in April 2022. owned by Marriott International, Inc.
