= Francesco Trapani =

Italian jeweller and luxury goods executive (1957–2025)

- Born: 1957; Naples, Italy
- Died: 10 September 2025 (aged 68); Rome, Italy
- Education: University of Naples, Economy; New York University, Business Administration
- Known for: CEO of Bulgari
- Partner: Lorenza de Liechtenstein
- Children: 3
- Mother: Lia Bulgari
- Relatives: Paolo Bulgari (uncle); Nicola Bulgari (uncle); Gianni Bulgari (uncle); Giorgio Bulgari (cousin); Giorgio Bulgari (grandfather); Sotirio Bulgari (great-grandfather)

Francesco Trapani (1957 – 10 September 2025) was an Italian jeweller and luxury goods executive who was the CEO of the Italian jeweller and luxury goods retailer Bulgari.

== Background ==
Trapani was the son of a surgeon and of Lia Bulgari (1933–2025), the elder sister of Paolo Bulgari – the current Chairman of the Bulgari group. Lia and her three brothers – Paolo, Nicola, and Gianni – are the grandchildren of Sotirio Bulgari, an Ottoman-born Greek silversmith, who was the Bulgari group founder.

Trapani died on 10 September 2025, aged 68.

== Career ==
Trapani took over the Bulgari group in 1984. He is credited with turning the company around into one of the more successful luxury jewellery brands. In 2001, he managed the Bulgari joint venture with Marriott International to open a set of Bulgari branded hotels, named Bulgari Hotels and Resorts. In 1995, Trapani oversaw the listing of Bulgari on the Milan Stock Exchange and SEAQ International in London.

Francesco Trapani oversaw the sales and integration of Bulgari within LVMH, in 2011.

Trapani replaced Philippe Pascal as the Head of Watches and Jewelry at LVMH, following the sale of Bulgari to LVMH until 2014, when he left the company.

He later joined Clessidra, an Italian private equity fund specialized in Luxury and apparel, in 2014, as senior partner, and Tages in 2016, while serving as board members of several companies.

Together with Marco Taricco and Giuseppe Bivona, Trapani launched an activist hedge fund with 50 million euros under management, called Bluebell Active Equity Fund, on November 11, 2019.

=== Bulgari sale to LVMH ===
Trapani described in a 2004 article that "one day, Bulgari is going to be sold, we'll see." He also described that "there are a couple of big companies that would be interested, but they have not approached us."

Regarding the sale of Bulgari to LVMH in March 2011, he indicated that the sale is because LVMH recognises Bulgari as a "star brand" and that he doesn't believe LVMH will "dilute" the brand.

== Other activities ==
- Salesforce, Member of the Advisory Board on Europe, the Middle East and Africa (since 2020)
