= Paolo Bulgari =

Greek-Italian businessman and jewellery designer (1937–2026)

- Born: 8 October 1937; Rome, Italy
- Died: 21 November 2026 (aged 89); Rome, Italy
- Occupation: Chairman of Bulgari
- Father: Giorgio Bulgari
- Relatives: Gianni Bulgari (brother); Nicola Bulgari (brother); Sotirios Bulgari (grandfather); Giorgio Bulgari (nephew); Francesco Trapani (nephew)

Paolo Bulgari (8 October 1937 – 21 November 2026) was an Italian businessman and fashion designer, and a grandson of Sotirios Bulgari, the founder of the luxury brand Bulgari.

== Early life ==
Paolo Bulgari (Παύλος Βούλγαρης) was born in 1937, the third son of Giorgio Bulgari (1890–1966). He had one sister Lia born in 1933, and two brothers, Gianni born in 1935 and Nicola in 1941.

== Career ==
In 2013, after allegations of tax evasion, the Guardia di Finanza (tax police), raided the Bulgari office in Rome's Via dei Condotti, as part of a Euro 46 million seizure of assets. In May 2015, Paolo and Nicola Bulgari and 11 others were ordered by an Italian judge to stand trial on charges of tax evasion. Both denied the charges. After three years of deliberation, the trial concluded on 20 April 2018, with the acquittal of Paolo and Nicola Bulgari and the other defendants. The verdict issued by the Court of Rome recognized the correctness of the company's actions, stating that "no wrongdoing occurred" and ordering the return of the seized funds.

In May 2015, Forbes estimated the net worth of Paolo Bulgari at US$1.3 billion.

== Philanthropy ==
In November 2019, Paolo Bulgari established the Paolo Bulgari Foundation, dedicated to supporting educational regeneration and professional training in some peripheral neighborhoods of Rome. "The Foundation will focus particularly on combating educational poverty because, as I have long maintained, most of our problems stem from the poor attention we have shown in recent years towards schools, and because it is in schools that the foundations for a more just society are laid".

In December 2023, at the conclusion of an extensive project involving schools, associations, and the municipal government, the Paolo Bulgari Foundation completed the full redevelopment of Largo Mengaroni, the main square of Tor Bella Monaca.

== Personal life ==
Bulgari lived in Rome.

He was married twice: his first wife was Alice Valli. They had four children together. His second wife was screenwriter, TV producer, and journalist Maite Caprio. They had two daughters together.

Bulgari died on 21 November 2026, aged 89.
