= Gianni Bulgari =

Italian businessman and designer

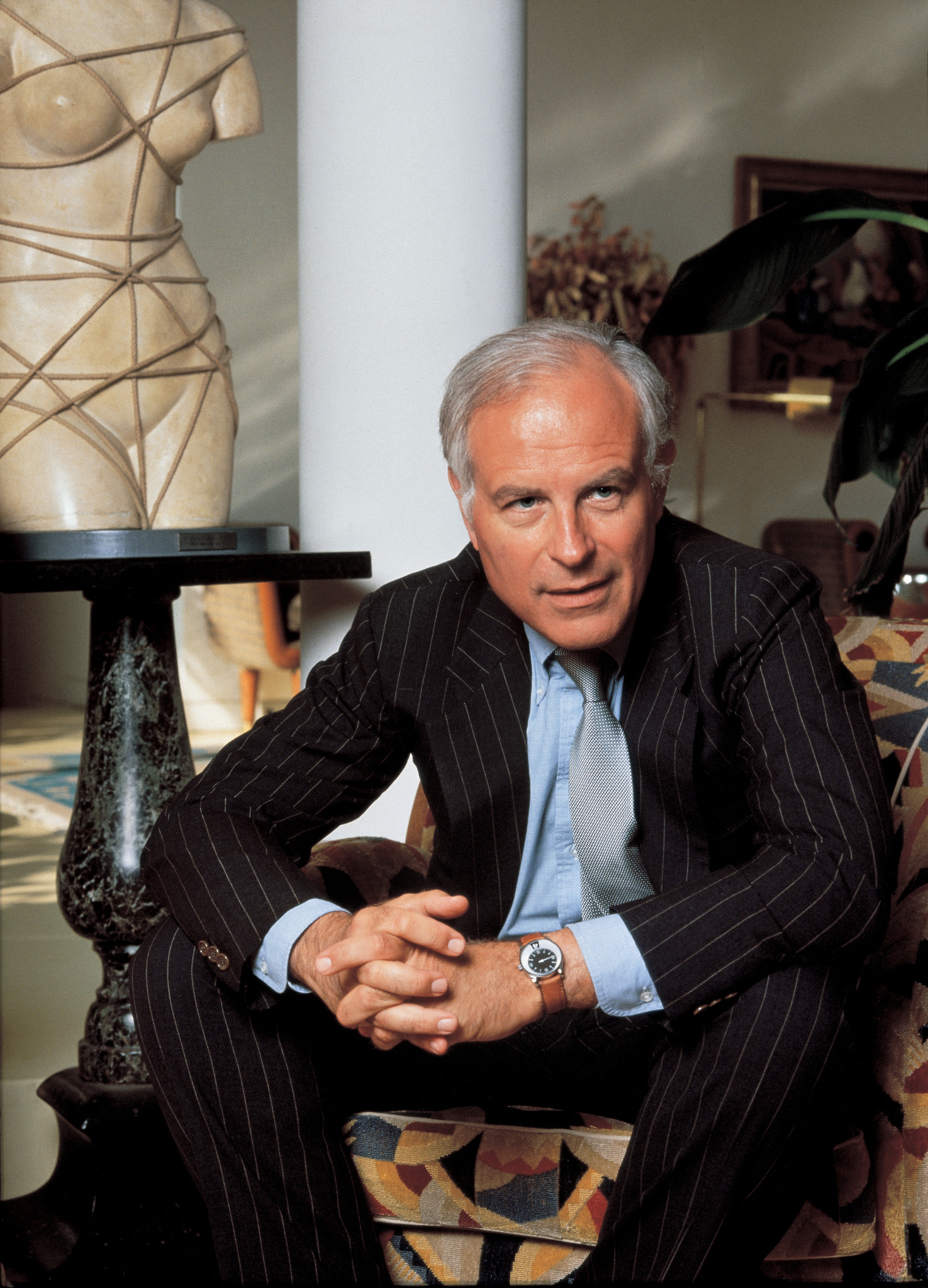
- Born: 1935 (age 90–91); Rome, Kingdom of Italy
- Occupations: Head of the luxury watchmaking and jewelry company GB-Enigma
- Known for: Former chief executive of Bulgari
- Children: Giorgio Bulgari
- Father: Giorgio Bulgari
- Relatives: Sotirio Bulgari (grandfather); Lia Bulgari (sister); Paolo Bulgari (brother); Nicola Bulgari (brother); Francesco Trapani (nephew)

Gianni Bulgari (born 1935) is an Italian businessman and designer. He is a member of the Bulgari's family of jewellers and led the Bulgari company from the 1960s to 1980s.

== Early life ==
Gianni Bulgari is the second son of Giorgio Bulgari and grandson of Sotirio Bulgari, the founder of the luxury brand Bulgari. He has one sister, Lia, born in 1933, and two brothers Paolo born in 1937 and Nicola in 1941. His nephew is Francesco Trapani.

He was born and grew up in Rome where he studied at "La Sapienza" University, Philosophy and Law, graduating in Law in 1960.

== Career ==
=== Bulgari ===
After his father's death in 1966, Gianni Bulgari led the family business as co-chief executive with his cousin Marina. As chairman and CEO of Bulgari in the early 70s, Gianni Bulgari initiated the internationalization of the company by opening shops in New York, Geneva, Monte Carlo and Paris.

In March 1975, Gianni Bulgari made international news when he was abducted and then released a month later in exchange of a ransom of $2 million.

In the late 70s, Gianni Bulgari led a complete overhaul of the company, establishing a new watch business and focusing on product design. Being both CEO and Art Director, Gianni Bulgari emphasized the creative mission of the company pursuing products "rare by design rather than price".

In 1987 following disagreements with his two brothers, Gianni Bulgari sold his stake in the company to them.

=== Fila ===
In 1988 Gianni Bulgari was appointed chairman of Fila, the Italian sportswear company.

During his tenure the company went public in the New York stoke exchange. He resigned in 1998.

=== GB-Enigma ===
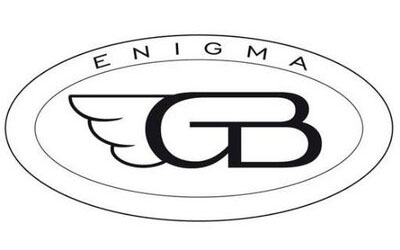
GB Enigma

In 1989, Gianni Bulgari founded a watchmaking company, GB Enigma in Neuchatel Switzerland, launching a series of watches featuring digital hours and analogic minutes of an unusual designs.

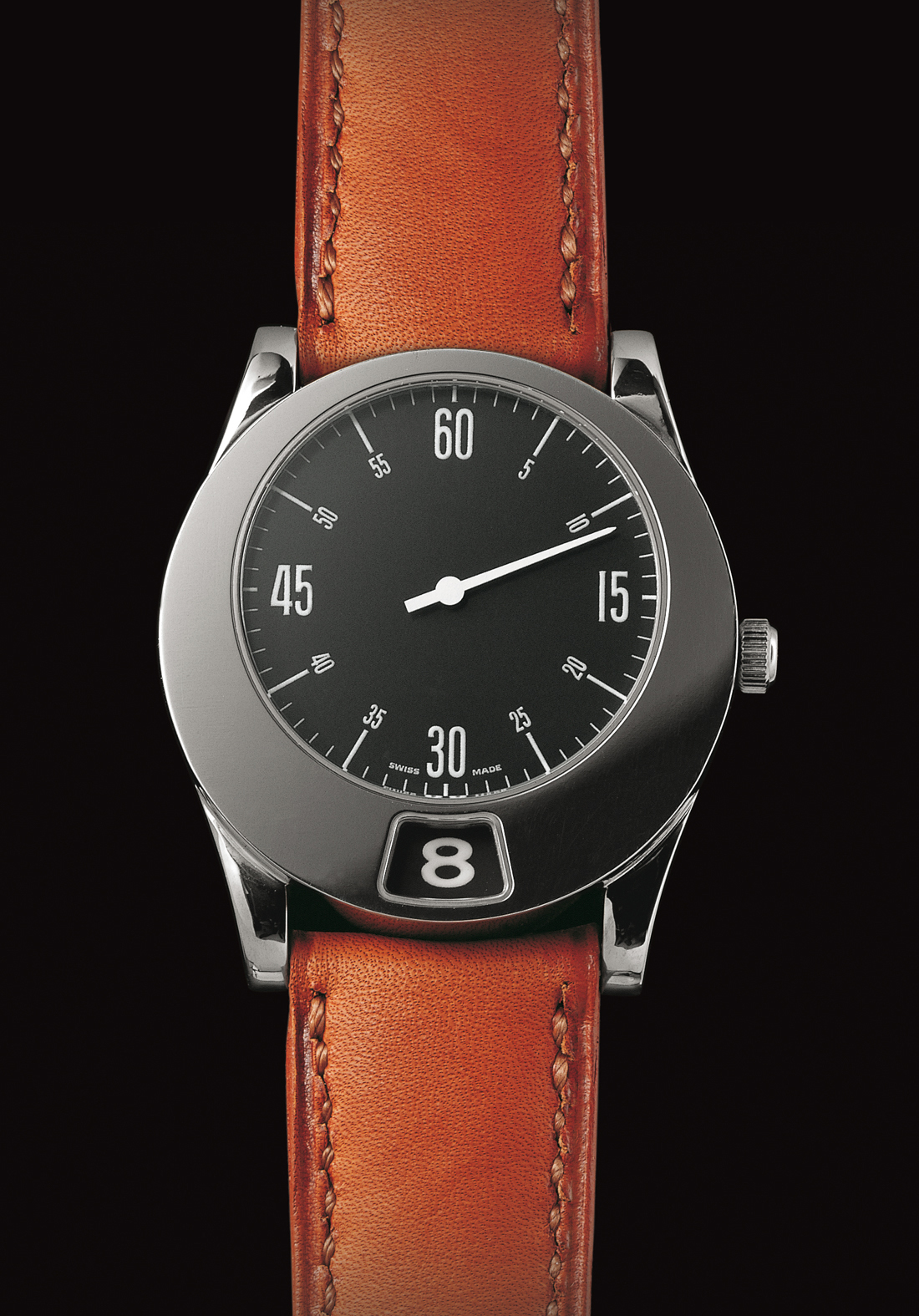
GB Enigma BiTime – Eccentric south

In 1997, inspired by clocks featured on dashboards of First World War airplanes Gianni Bulgari launched BMW, the "Bazel Manual Winder", a mechanical watch to be rewinded by turning the bezel. It still remains unique.

Further on Gianni Bulgari started also to make jewellery opening one store in Rome in 2005 and another one in Geneva in 2006.

=== "Reinventing the idea of a Lady’s watch" ===
Convinced that the watch industry had remained hostage of its own male mechanical tradition whose culture was unfit to address the female market, Gianni Bulgari started a thorough research into the world of lady's watches.

An exploration was undertaken, by making thousands of actual size models to explore all different avenues of watch case design. Bulgari's revelations included: that a watch could be a "jewel" without being precious; a jewel decorated by a watch, paradoxically yet pertinently a "useful jewel"; the other that the path to woman could lead to some watches that could also be liked by men: some, admittedly, keener on contemporary craft than horologic nostalgia.

Free from the traditions of male watchmaking, new designs were developed with emphasis on specific cultures, such as American pop art and far-east decorative traditions from China and Japan. The products became distinctive as "rare by design rather than price" and with the help of GB's name recognition, the brand achieved great success in this new undertaking.

Before undertaking the task of its commercialization, Gianni Bulgari has licensed Alatron SA, a Swiss company specializing in table clocks, designing a collection of innovative artifacts exploiting some design patterns used in the lady's collection.

== Other activities and personal life ==
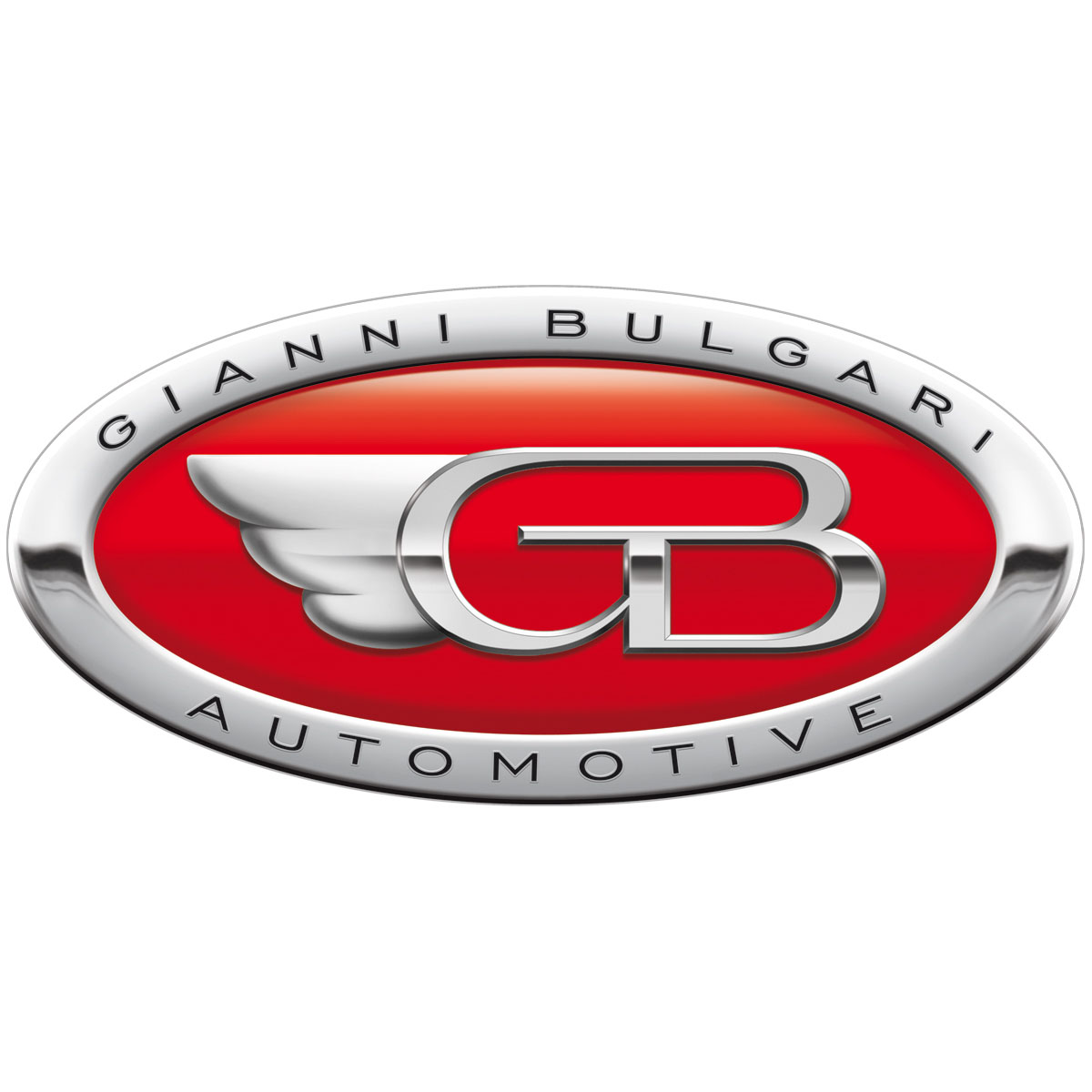
Gianni Bulgari Automotive

Gianni Bulgari has nurtured different interests all along his life.

After racing cars in the early 60s he became passionate about flying, both aircraft and gliders, taking a financial interest in a light plane manufacturer, Partenavia, that was sold in early 80s to Aeritalia. Passionate about all means of transportation, but especially automobiles, he also acted as a consultant for Fiat in the 80s.

In 1989 aware of the connection between watches and automobiles Gianni Bulgari designed and developed a car prototype with Lotus Engineering of UK, with the idea to be produced and distributed under the same Gianni Bulgari's brand of watches, in an alliance with one of the major car manufacturers.

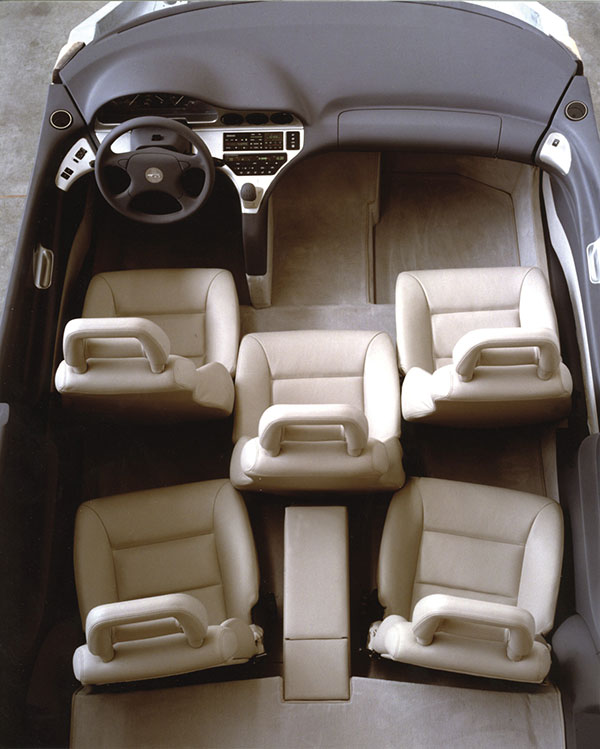
Gianni Bulgari's prototype actually on display at the Gianni Agnelli Automobile Museum in Turin

This project centered on an interior design concept that received both European and US patents. Although the project was not commercialized, the prototype is currently on display at the Gianni Agnelli Automobile Museum in Turin.

In the course of the 90s, Gianni Bulgari took a controlling interest in Moto Guzzi, the Italian historic motorcycle manufacturer, that was later sold to Piaggio.

Gianni Bulgari is keen on all 20th century arts as well as industrial design.

Interested in politics Gianni Bulgari wrote articles for some of the major Italian newspapers like Corriere della Sera and Repubblica.

Gianni Bulgari has a son, Giorgio Bulgari and two grandchildren.
