= Francesco Caramora =

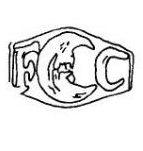

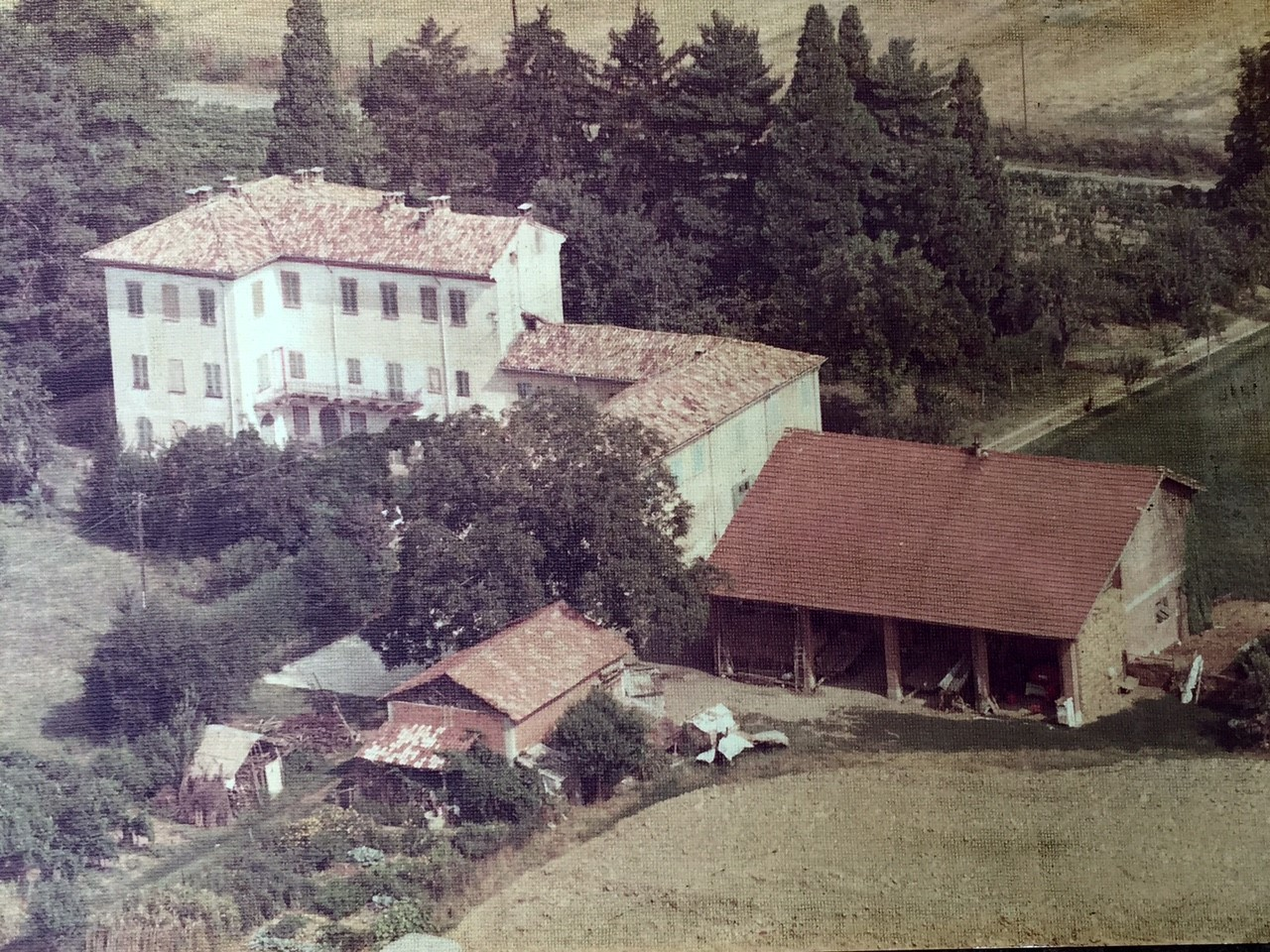

Francesco Caramora was the master goldsmith who gave rise to the successful artistic and artisanal tradition in Valenza.

Caramora was born in Pavia in about 1787. He learned the goldsmith's art in neighbouring Voghera and went into business with an uncle running a shop selling gold artefacts.

In 1817, he married Giuseppa Tremolada and moved to Valenza, a quiet agricultural village at the time, where he set up his own business as a master goldsmith.

In 1825, he registered the first mark in the history of Valenza goldsmithing at the Alessandria Trademark Office. The mark bore his initials separated by a drawing of the half-moon.

In 1826, he purchased a farm surrounded by land, just outside Valenza: he lived here, and it can be assumed that he also had part of his workshop here.

The building must be the “Goldsmith's Farm” we find recorded on the Napoleonic maps of 1875: in those days, Francesco Caramora was the only goldsmith in Valenza. It is likely that the undistinguished farm became known as the “casceina d’ urei”, the “goldsmith's farm” in local dialect.

By opening his workshop and training two apprentices, he started a process that transformed Valenza into the world-renowned City of Gold.

Francesco Caramora died prematurely in 1827, leaving insufficient assets to cover his debts. His estate was auctioned and was bought nearly entirely by his apprentice Piero Canti, who also took over from Francesco Caramora in his workshop. Continuing to establish Valenza's unique position in goldsmithing, he taught his art to other workers.

== Sources ==
- Gioielli e gioiellieri di Valenza / Lia lenti. Allemandi, 1994
- Alle origini dell’oreficeria valenzana / Gian Isidoro De Piaggia. Published in the “Unindustria” magazine in 1991, and Valensa d’una vota no. 23-24
- Valenza : in the maps of Fondo Carlo Dabene / Carlo Dabene, Ferruccio Quaroni, Riccardo Massola et al., 2010
- Coeclerici : una storia di affari e di sogni / Pier Paolo Preti. – Milano : Libri Scheiwiller, 2004
