= Bogoria =

Bogoria may refer to:

- Lake Bogoria, lake in Kenya
- Gmina Bogoria, municipality in central Poland
- Bogoria, Poland, village in Gmina Bogoria, central Poland
- Bogoria, Sandomierz County, village in Świętokrzyskie Voivodeship (south-central Poland)
- Bogoria family (Bogoriowie), family of Polish knights
- Bogoria coat of arms, heraldic coat of arms of the Bogoria family
- Bogoria (plant), a genus of orchids
