= Nicola Bulgari =

Italian billionaire businessman (born 1941)

- Born: 1941 (age 84–85); Rome, Italy
- Occupation: Vice chairman of Bulgari
- Spouses: Anna (m. 1963–1994): Beatrice Bordone
- Children: 4
- Father: Giorgio Bulgari
- Relatives: Gianni Bulgari (brother); Paolo Bulgari (brother); Sotirios Bulgari (grandfather); Giorgio Bulgari (nephew); Francesco Trapani (nephew)
- Website: www.nicolabulgari.it

Nicola Bulgari (born 1941) is an Italian billionaire businessman and grandson of Sotirios Bulgari, founder of the luxury brand Bulgari.

== Early life and education ==
Nicola Bulgari was born in Rome in 1941, the fourth son of Giorgio Bulgari (1890–1966). He has one sister, Lia, born in 1933, and two brothers: Gianni, born in 1935, and Paolo, born in 1937.

== Career ==
He has been vice chairman of Bulgari since 1984.

In 2013, after allegations of tax evasion, the Italian Guardia di Finanza raided the Bulgari office in Rome's Via Condotti as part of a €46 million (US$63 million) seizure of assets. In May 2015, Paolo and Nicola Bulgari and 11 others were ordered by an Italian judge to stand trial on charges of tax evasion. Both denied the charges.

In January 2017, Forbes estimated the net worth of Bulgari at US$1.31 billion (€1.22 billion).

He received the America Award from the Italy–USA Foundation in 2015.

== Personal life ==
Bulgari has four children and lives in Rome. He was married to his first wife, Anna, from 1963 until at least 1994. His second wife, Beatrice Bordone, is a costume designer, and was responsible for the costumes for the film Cinema Paradiso.

He collects vintage cars, especially American marques, in both Allentown, Pennsylvania, and Rome. His 21-acre facility in Allentown houses 125 cars in seven warehouses. He has 85 or more cars in Rome, and flies them to Allentown when they need repairs. His favourite marque is Buick, and he has many from 1940 and 1941.
