= Bulgaria, Cluj-Napoca =

Coordinates: 46.7881°N 23.6242°E

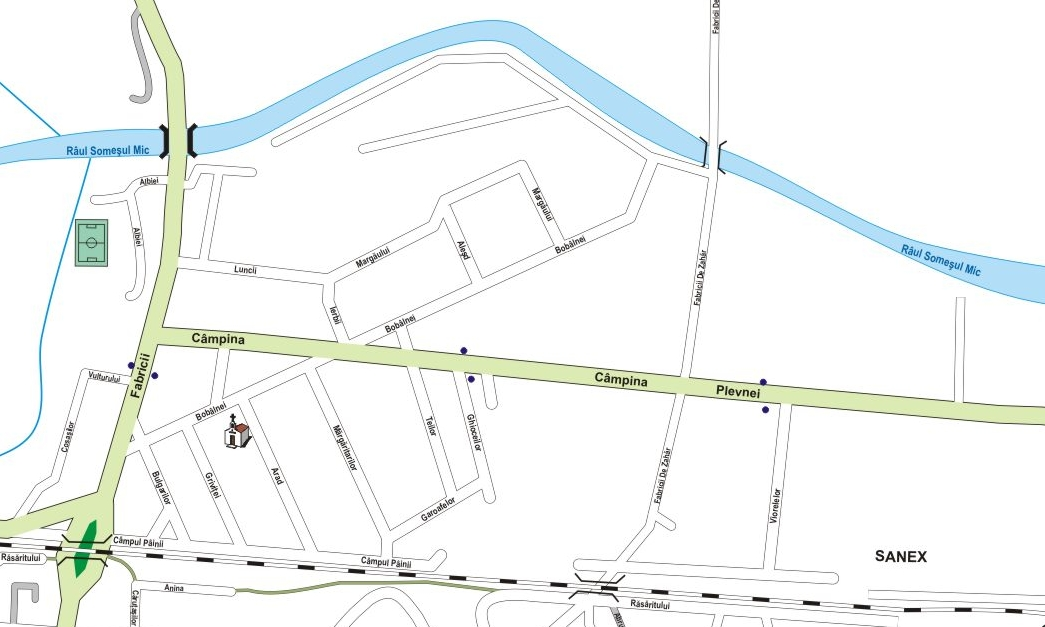
Map of Bulgaria in Cluj-Napoca

Bulgaria is an industrial district in Cluj-Napoca in Romania, located between a railway and the Someșul Mic River.

== History ==
In the 17th century, there was a village at the site that was inhabited by Hungarians, Transylvanian Saxons and Romanians. Bulgarian gardeners settled there in the 18th century, drawn by the fertile soil which was suitable for growing vegetables. They named the region.

By the early 20th century, it was known as "the vegetable garden of Cluj." In addition to vegetables, Bulgarian settlers grew herbs, which they supplied to the markets of Cluj.
