= Voulgaris =

Voulgaris, also transliterated as Bulgaris, is a Greek surname. Per Stefanos Voulgaris, who printed in 2016 the "Family chronicles the Voulgaris family" (of Corfu), a genealogical book written in Venetian Corfu, which cites a 15th-century testament of Stefanos Voulgaris claiming that the founding fathers of the family were Khan Tervel, Ivan Sratsimir of Bulgaria and Stefan Eleazar who were "kings of the Triballi". In these family chronicles the author claims Bulgarian royal roots and connects the roots of the "Voulgaris family of Saint Spyridon of Corfu" to the "barbarian peoples" from Volga river, who "finally settled in Moesia near the Haemus mountains". After all, in his escape to the southwest, it was the Serbian despot Stefan Lazarević (Stefan Eliazar) who was singled out as the founder of the Bulgari family from Corfu. Through the Peloponnese, he headed to Morea and from there settled on the Ottoman-free Ionian island.

The author Stefanos Voulgaris has claimed that their family tree is well-traced and that the Voulgaris family of Corfu is unrelated to the Voulgaris family of the founder of Bulgari company, Sotirios Voulgaris.

Notable people with the surname include:

- From the Voulgaris family of Corfu (el) (Greek: Βούλγαρις, Βούλγαρης)
  - Nicolas Voulgaris (1634–after 1684), Greek theologian and physician
  - Chrisostomos Voulgaris, 17th-century Greek writer, brother of the former
  - Eugenios Voulgaris (1716–1806), Greek Orthodox educator and Eastern Orthodox bishop
  - Stamatis Voulgaris (1774–1842), Green urban planner
- From the Voulgaris family of Epirus of Aromanian origin
  - Sotirios Voulgaris (1857–1932), Greek jeweller, founder of the Bulgari company
- From the Voulgaris family of Hydra (el) (Greek: Βούλγαρης)
  - Dimitrios Voulgaris (1802–1878), Greek revolutionary and Prime Minister of Greece
  - Petros Voulgaris (1884–1957), Greek admiral and Prime Minister of Greece
- Other people named Voulgaris
  - Eleftherios Voulgaris (1836–1887), Greek stage actor
  - Pantelis Voulgaris (born 1940), Greek film director and screenwriter
  - Haralabos Voulgaris (born 1975), Canadian professional gambler
