= SS Bulgaria (1898) =

Passenger steamship built in 1898

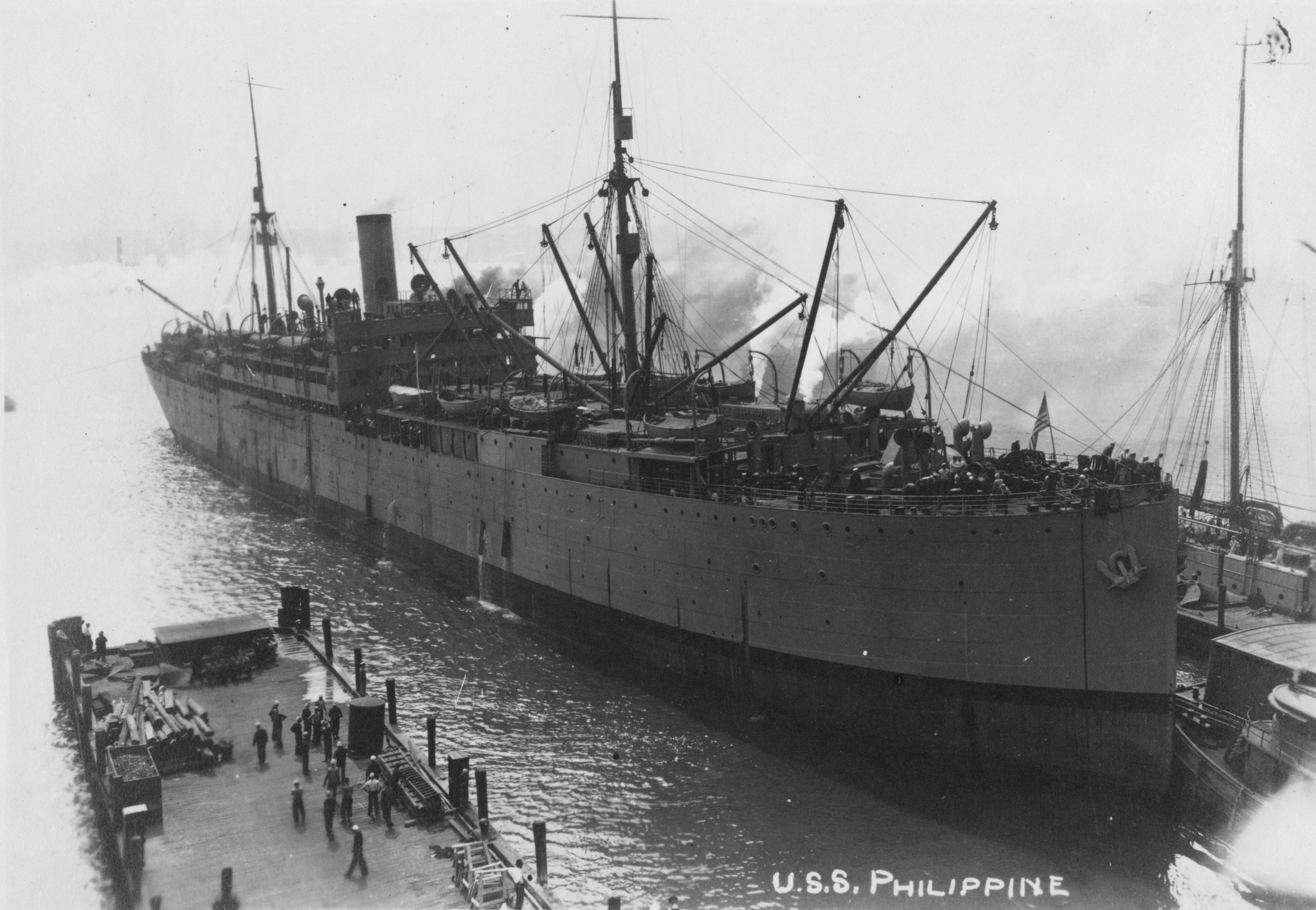
- USS Philippines (ID-1677)—originally SS Bulgaria—in port, 1919

History
- Name: Bulgaria
- Operator: Hamburg America Line (1898–1913); Unione Austriaca (1913); Hamburg America Line (1913–17); U.S. Army (1917–19); U.S. Navy (May–Oct 1919); France and Canada Steamship Co. (1920)
- Builder: Blohm & Voss (Hamburg, Germany)
- Yard number: 125
- Launched: 5 February 1898
- Completed: 4 April 1898
- Commissioned: (USN): May 1919–Oct? 1919
- Maiden voyage: 10 April 1898
- In service: 1898–1914; 1917–1920
- Out of service: Jul 1914–1917; 1921–24
- Renamed: Canada (1913); Bulgaria (1913); USAT Hercules (1917); USAT Philippines (1917 or later); USS Philippines (ID-1677) (1919); Philippines (1919)
- Refit: —as troop transport, 1919; —as freighter, 1920
- Fate: Broken up at Perth Amboy, 1924

General characteristics
- Type: Passenger freighter (1898–1914)
- Tonnage: 10,237 GRT
- Length: 501 ft 4 in (152.8 m)
- Beam: 62 ft 2 in (18.9 m)
- Draft: 30 ft 10 in (9.4 m)
- Installed power: 2 × 4-cyl quad expansion; 4,200 ihp (3,132 kW)
- Propulsion: Twin screw
- Speed: 13 knots (24 km/h; 15 mph)
- Crew: 89

General characteristics
- Type: Troopship (May–Oct 1919)
- Tonnage: 11,440 GRT; 13,040 DWT
- Displacement: 11,480
- Depth of hold: 40 ft 6 in (12.3 m)
- Speed: 10 knots (19 km/h; 12 mph)
- Capacity: 86 officers, 3,940 enlisted
- Complement: 25 officers, 168 enlisted
- Notes: Other characteristics as for passenger freighter

SS Bulgaria was a passenger-cargo steamship built in 1898 for the Hamburg American Line ("Hapag"). During World War I, she operated as a United States Army animal and cargo ship under the names USAT Hercules and USAT Philippines, and after the war was converted into the troop transport USS Philippines (ID-1677).

In 1899, after only a few months in service, Bulgaria was caught in a severe hurricane and disabled in mid-ocean for some weeks, her captain and officers later being decorated for their conduct during the incident. After this, Bulgaria settled into regular service between Hamburg, Germany and various ports in the United States until 1913, when she was acquired by Unione Austriaca and renamed SS Canada. After making only two trips between Trieste and Canada with this company however, the ship returned to service with Hapag and reverted to her original name.

With the outbreak of World War I, Bulgaria was laid up in Baltimore until the entry of the United States into the war in 1917, when she was seized by the U.S. and used as the animal and general cargo transport USAT Hercules, later renamed USAT Philippines. In the postwar period, Philippines was transferred to the U.S. Navy, commissioned as USS Philippines (ID-1677), and used to help repatriate U.S. troops from France. After decommissioning in 1919, the ship was converted into the cargo-only merchant steamer SS Philippines, but made only a couple of voyages in this role before being laid up in 1921. Philippines was broken up at New Jersey in 1924.

== Construction and design ==
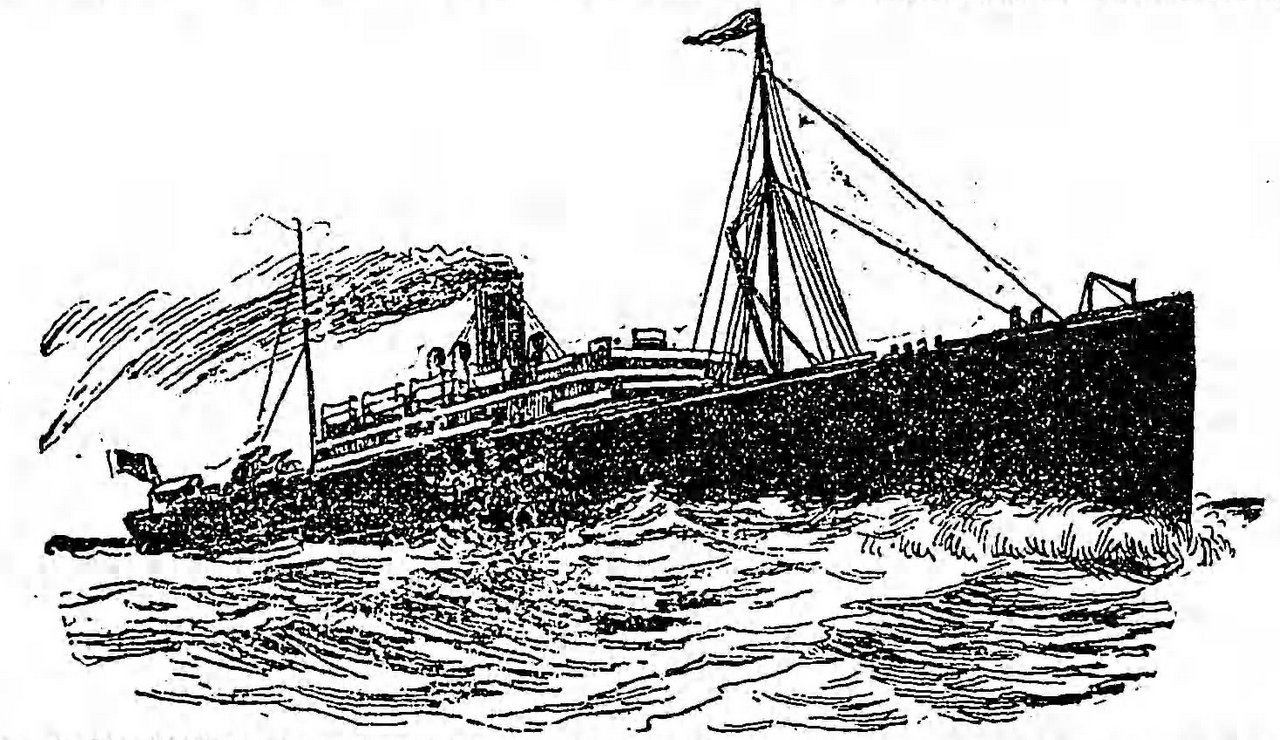
Sketch of SS Bulgaria, ca. 1899

SS Bulgaria—a steel-hulled, twin-screw passenger-cargo steamer—was built by Blohm & Voss at Steinwerder, Germany, in 1898 for the Hamburg–America Line (Hapag). Her yard number was 125. She was launched on 5 February and completed 4 April 1898.

Bulgaria had a length of 501 feet 4 inches (152.8 m), a beam of 62 feet 2 inches (18.9 m), draft of 30 feet 10 inches (9.4 m) and hold depth of 40 feet 6 inches (12.3 m). She had an original gross register tonnage of 10,237, net register tonnage of 7,305 and deadweight tonnage of 13,000 long tons (13,000 t). In addition to her cargo space, Bulgaria had accommodation for 300 2nd-class and 2,400 3rd-class passengers, and was manned by a crew of 89 including officers. The ship had ten watertight bulkheads, four decks, two masts and a single smokestack.

Bulgaria was powered by a pair of four-cylinder quadruple-expansion steam engines, with cylinders of 21, 31, 46 and 66.5 inches (53, 79, 117 and 169 cm) respectively by 48-inch (1,219.2 mm) stroke, driving her twin-screw propellers. Steam was supplied by two double-ended and two single Scotch boilers, (Note: The USSB mentions only two double-ended boilers.) with a working pressure of 200 psi (1,400 kPa). The engines delivered a combined 4,200 indicated horsepower (3,132 kW), giving the ship a service speed of 13 knots (15 mph; 24 km/h). (Note: Note that later sources give a lower speed for the vessel of from 10 to 12 knots. These probably reflect the condition of the engine and boilers at the time the testing was done.)

== Service history ==
Bulgaria entered service with Hapag on a route from Hamburg, Germany, to Halifax, Nova Scotia, and New York, her maiden voyage commencing 10 April 1898.

=== Hurricane ordeal, 1899 ===
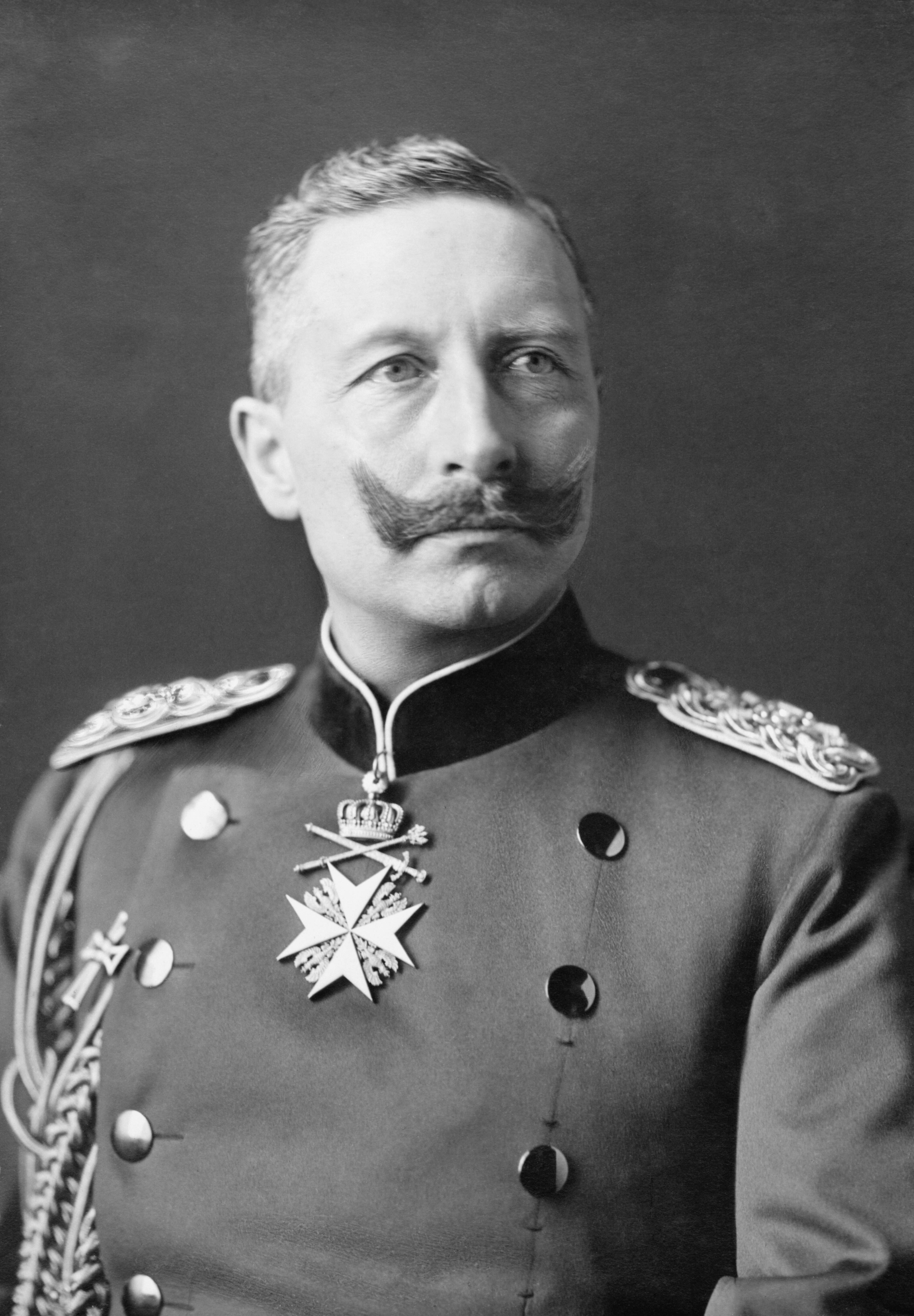
Kaiser Wilhelm II of Germany decorated Bulgaria's captain for gallantry after the 1899 hurricane

On 28 January 1899, Bulgaria departed New York bound for Bremen, carrying 130 persons including 89 crew and 41 mostly German steerage passengers including men, women and children, along with cargoes which included grain. In the evening of 1 February, the ship ran into a severe hurricane, forcing the captain to heave to. During the night, the ship's flying bridges were carried away, and the next morning a large stabilizing spring in the rudder broke, followed by the loss of the rudder itself together with much of the steering apparatus, leaving the ship "as a toy at the mercy of the wind and waves." Heavy seas carried away several of the hatches, allowing water into the holds. This was followed by a shifting of the ship's cargoes, causing the vessel to develop a heavy list to port, with the deck reportedly "level with the water on the port side." Exacerbating the problem, a herd of more than 100 horses in a pen on the foredeck stampeded, trampling one another to death, their bodies sliding to port and contributing to the ship's list. After an attempt by members of the crew to calm the surviving horses failed, the ship's butcher euthanased them by cutting their throats, though badly injured himself in the process.

For the next 72 hours, passengers and crew alike worked at jettisoning the ship's cargoes in an attempt to right the vessel, but to little effect. On 5 February, the captain instructed all hands to prepare to abandon ship, as rising water levels in the boiler room were threatening to extinguish the ship's fires. The same morning, however, the tank steamer Weehawken, followed by two more steamers, Vittoria and Koordistan, were successively sighted, all of whom responded to Bulgaria's distress signals and stood by to assist. Two boats from Weehawken successfully collected 25 women and children from Bulgaria, but a third containing four of Bulgaria's crew broke away from the ship before more passengers could be embarked, and in spite of numerous attempts was unable to return to the stricken vessel, the four crewmen eventually being picked up by Vittoria. During the night, the hurricane increased in intensity and the three steamers, having lost contact with Bulgaria, continued on their way the following day, with Weehawken later reporting Bulgaria to be "in a sinking condition."

After losing contact with the other steamers, Bulgaria's remaining crew and passengers continued to jettison cargo until 7 February, while a spell of relative calm on 9 February enabled them to throw overboard the bodies of 107 horses. On 14 February, the steamer Antillian attempted to take Bulgaria in tow, but having twice failed, also proceeded on its way. With the weather finally moderating on 20 February, Bulgaria's crew were able to complete temporary repairs to the ship's rudder, and by 21 February Bulgaria was again under way, arriving safely at Ponta Delgada, Azores, on 24 February. In spite of the many adversities, only one person, a crew member, had been lost throughout the three-week ordeal. The crew and passengers—"especially the women"—were publicly commended for their calmness and courage during the hurricane, and Bulgaria's captain was later decorated for gallantry by Kaiser Wilhelm II, who also ordered the band of the Curassiers to greet the ship on her return to Hamburg. The following May, Lloyd's of London awarded medals to the captain and two officers of Bulgaria, along with an officer and six seamen of Weehawken, for "meritorious services".

=== 1907 – July 1914 ===
On 2 May 1907, Bulgaria contributed to a then-record number of 20,729 immigrants arriving at the port of New York in a single 24-hour period. Bulgaria apparently made the largest contribution to the total with 2,724 steerage passengers, while thirteen other ships contributed the balance of 17,995.

In 1910, Bulgaria was switched to the Hamburg—Boston—Baltimore route, maintaining that service until February 1913, when she was acquired from Hapag by Unione Austriaca. Renamed SS Canada, the ship was placed on a newly established route from Trieste, Austria-Hungary, to Quebec and Montreal, Canada. After only two voyages on this route between April and August, however, Canada was withdrawn as she had proven too large for the available demand. Returned to Hapag, the ship reverted to her original name of Bulgaria, and on 6 December 1913 resumed her prior Hamburg—Boston—Baltimore route. With the mammoth ocean liner Vaterland entering Hapag service in May 1914, Bulgaria's route was modified to run directly from Hamburg to Baltimore. Bulgaria completed her last voyage for Hapag to Baltimore on 27 July 1914, a day before the outbreak of war.

=== World War I ===
With the outbreak of World War I on 28 July 1914, the Hamburg-America Line suspended its services, announcing shortly thereafter that all of its steamships, with the exception of Vaterland and Amerika, were available for sale. Bulgaria was consequently laid up at Baltimore, with her officers and crew obliged to make their home on the ship, though permitted by U.S. authorities "to come and go much as they wish." In August 1915, the Swedish American Line reportedly made an offer for the purchase of three Hapag ships including Bulgaria, but the sale did not eventuate. On 13 December 1915, amid reports that the crew of Bulgaria had been detected sending and receiving wireless transmissions, a U.S. Naval officer boarded the vessel and deactivated the wireless by sealing its antenna socket.

With the entry of the United States into the war in April 1917, all German ships interned in American ports, including Bulgaria, were seized by the United States government for utilization in the war effort. On 6 April—three days after America's declaration of war—Bulgaria was taken over by the United States Army. For the remainder of the war, she was employed by the Army as an animal and general cargo transport, during which period she operated with an armed guard aboard under the names USAT Hercules and later, USAT Philippines.

=== U.S. Navy troop transport, April–October 1919 ===
After the war, the foreign contingent of the American Cruiser and Transport Force withdrew, necessitating a rapid expansion of the U.S. Navy's troop transport fleet in order to quickly return U.S. troops abroad to the United States. To address this problem, a total of 56 ships, including the army transport Philippines, were selected for conversion into troop transports.

Philippines was converted into a troop transport at Hoboken, New Jersey by W. & A. Fletcher Co. between 28 April and 23 May 1919, at a cost of $226,815. On 1 May, while still undergoing conversion, the ship was transferred to the United States Navy and commissioned as USS Philippines (ID-1677). After conversion, USS Philippines had a crew complement of 25 officers and 168 enlisted men, and a troop-carrying capacity of 86 officers and 3,940 enlisted men.

As part of the Cruiser and Transport Force, Philippines subsequently made two round trips to France to repatriate U.S. troops, the second returning to the United States on 26 September. In total, the ship returned 4,142 soldiers to the U.S. on these two voyages, including six sick or wounded. With her mission complete, USS Philippines was struck from the Naval Vessel Register while at Newport News, Virginia on 23 October, and transferred the same day to the management of the United States Shipping Board (USSB).

=== Later history ===
After acquiring Philippines from the Navy, the USSB invited tenders for converting the ship into a freighter, and on 4 December 1919 the contract was awarded to the Baltimore Shipbuilding and Dry Dock Company. Work on the vessel was completed 10 January 1920, after which she was chartered from the USSB by the France and Canada Steamship Company.

SS Philippines is known to have completed at least two voyages for France and Canada Steamship in 1920, the first to Rotterdam, Netherlands, and the second via Newport News to Gothenburg, Sweden. Not long after, however, the France and Canada Steamship Company ran into financial difficulties, and by June 1921 Philippines had been laid up.

Philippines's condition was still rated A1 in 1922, but by this time the massive postwar oversupply of shipping had become fully evident and there was apparently no demand for her services. She was broken up at Perth Amboy, New Jersey, in early 1924.
