= Bogdan Irkük =

Bulgarian musician/producer/DJ

Bogdan Irkük a.k.a. BULGARI
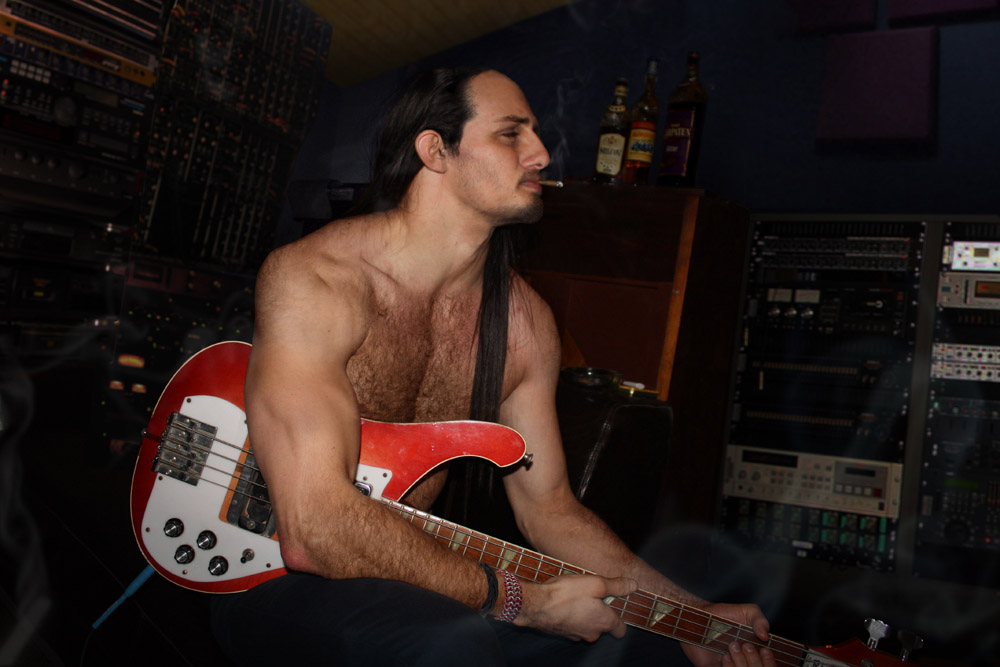
- Irkük in 2008

Background information
- Also known as: Bulgari, Kàrpatja Bolgari, Steppe Ghost
- Born: 1976 (age 49–50); Sofia, Bulgaria
- Genres: Electro; Disco; Boogie; House; Italo
- Occupations: Record producer, musician, disc jockey
- Years active: 2007–Present
- Labels: Rollerboys Recordings; Soul Jazz Records
- Website: http://www.b-u-l-g-a-r-i.biz

Bogdan Irkük, a.k.a. BULGARI (Богдан Иркук а.к.а. БУЛГАРИ), is a Bulgarian musician/producer/DJ. He has previously performed under the name BULGARI.

== Biography ==
Bogdan Irkük was born 1976 in Sofia, Bulgaria. His mother is of Hutsul ancestry. He grew up listening to the music of his brother's friend's pirate radio station, where he learned to appreciate Chic, Chaka Khan, Zapp, Stevie Wonder and Electric Light Orchestra.

He started releasing material after meeting the Rollerboys at a DJ gig in Munich.

== Style ==
Irkük's style draws heavily from Italo disco, New York and Chicago house, and other forms of early styles of electronic dance music. Use of vocoders and analog synthesizer sounds are common in his songs. Irkük produces music on Ableton Live.

== Discography ==
=== Releases ===
- The Distant EP (Rollerboys Recordings, 2007)
- The Coastal EP (Rollerboys Recordings, 2008)
- Everything Is Changing (Soul Jazz Records, 2008)
- When I Dream of New York (Epic Disco Vol. 1) (Rollerboys Recordings, 2009)
- The Thracian EP (Rollerboys Recordings, 2011)
- Twice (Djurriket Records, 2011)

=== Remixes ===
- Jens Lekman "Sipping on the Sweet Nectar" (Service/Rollerboys Recordings, 2008)
- Al Usher "Lullaby For Robert" (Internasjonal, 2009)
- Sally Shapiro "Miracle" (Permanent Vacation, 2009)

=== Compilations ===
- Body Language Vol.5 by Chateau Flight "The Distant Message(Arken Remix)" (Get Physical, 2007)
- Nu Balearica by Fred Deakin "Space Reflecting on the Bosporos" (Ministry of Sound, 2008)
- Singles 2008–2009 "Everything Is Changing" (Soul Jazz Records, 2009)
