= Sotirios Voulgaris =

Greek silversmith and distinguished businessman (1857–1932)

Sotirios Voulgaris (Greek: Σωτήριος Βούλγαρης; Italian: Sotirio Bulgari; 18 March 1857 – 1932) was a Greek silversmith and distinguished businessman, who founded the Bulgari company, which flourished in business in Italy, and later internationally, in the area of gold- and silversmithing and fashion accessory.

== Biography ==
Voulgaris was born on 18 March 1857, in Paramythia, in the Sanjak of Ioannina, Ioannina Eyalet, later Janina Vilayet, part of the Ottoman Epirus (now Thesprotia, Epirus, Greece), where he spent his childhood. He originated from the village of Kalarrytes, which at the time was the largest silversmithing centre in the Balkans. He was one of the eleven children of a Greek family. His father was Georgios Voulgaris (1823–1889), and his mother was Eleni Strouggaris. He was an ethnic Aromanian. Sotirios ultimately was the only one who survived of all his siblings.

Inspired by his grandfather, Konstantinos, Voulgaris became a silversmith, first making belts and then earrings, sword cases and silver buttons. He had both talent and passion and thus he became active professionally and timidly began the profession of goldsmith - silversmith in the villages of Epirus, while together with his father they travelled from the area of Epirus (today Greece) to today Albania to sell their creations.

In Paramythia he opened his first silversmithing workshop with the help of his father. Then, due to the difficulties arising from the cold and political unrest, but also the bad situation due to the Ottoman occupation, his father suggested that they leave the country and find a place where they could work in peace and create a business.

They ended up settling in Corfu, Greece. Ιn 1888, he married Eleni Baziou, with whom he had six children; Konstantinos-Georgios (Costantino Bulgari) (1889–1973), Leonidas-Georgios (Giorgio Bulgari; 1890–1966), Maria-Athina (1891–1976), Sofia (1893–1908), Alexandra (1895–1984) and Spyridon (1897–1932).

Soon they left for Naples, Italy.

== Company ==
The family established their first store in Naples, but they faced difficulties due to robberies and eventually closed the store.

Then, in 1881, they moved to Rome, and in 1884 they opened their first shop in Via Sistina 85, and then they opened a second shop in Via Sistina, inspired by Charles Dickens' novel. Shortly after, they created the main store in Via dei Condotti together with his two sons, Constantino and Giorgio.

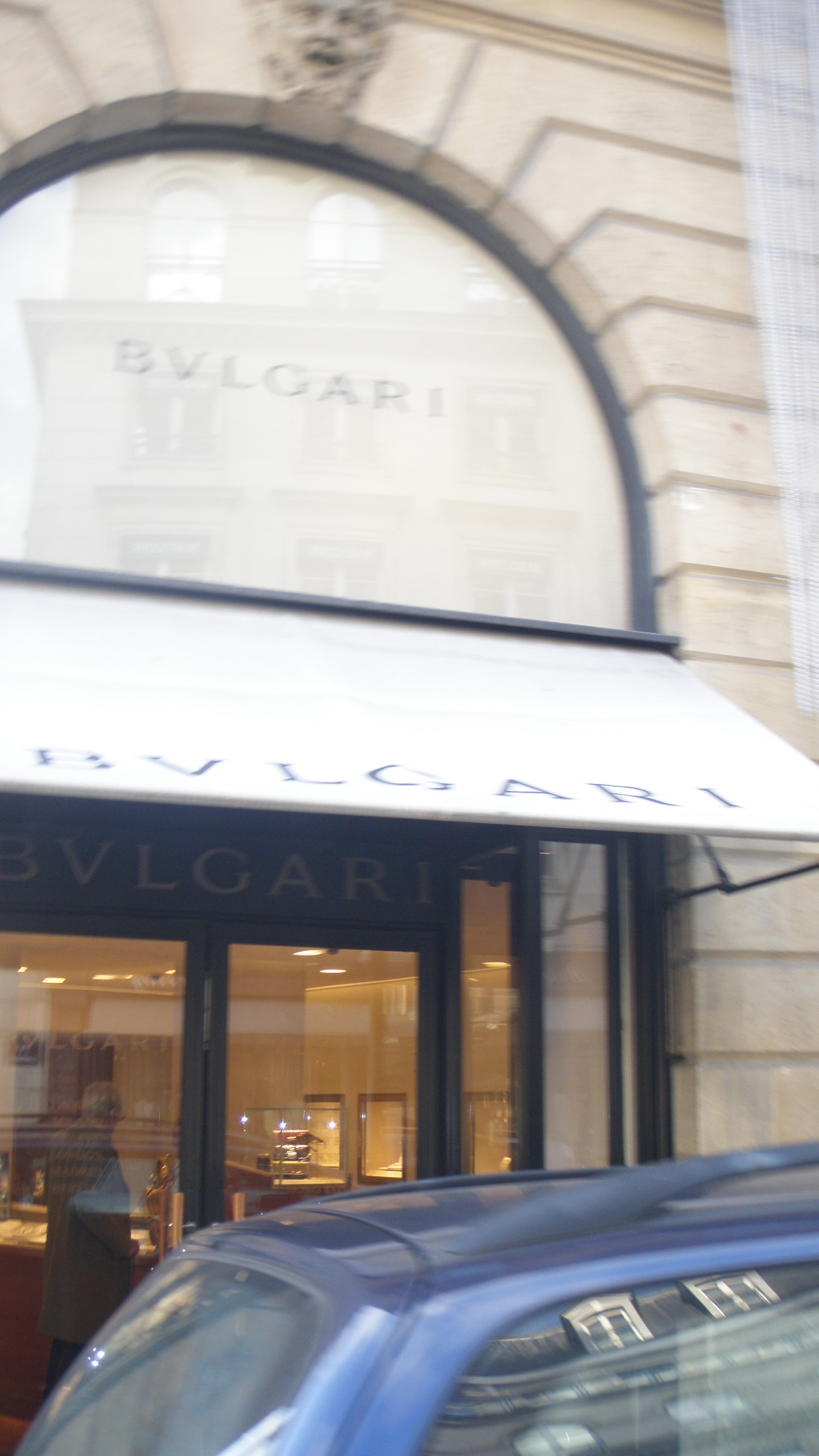
Bvlgari store in Paris

In 1905, he opened the store on Condotti Street, which would become the company's main store. In its early years, his company, Bulgari, became known for silver pieces that incorporated elements from Byzantine and Islamic art, combining them with floral motifs. At the time, Paris, France, was the centre of fashion and creativity and greatly influenced Bulgari's designs. Jewellery from the 1920s included platinum Art Deco settings, while pieces from the 1930s had geometric diamond patterns, often combined with coloured gemstones.

Sotirios Voulgaris died in 1932, leaving his business to his two sons, Giorgio (1890–1966) and Constantino (1889–1973), who both had a great interest in precious stones and jewellery. The company expanded and eventually established four stores while growing rapidly over the following decades.

== Aftermath ==
After his death, his sons Costantino and Giorgio took over the management of the company together. During the 1970s, the first Bulgari stores opened abroad, including in cities such as New York City, Paris, Monte Carlo and Geneva, while the brand began to gain global fame with famous artists and actors wearing its jewellery at public events and on the big screen.

The evolution continues, with Sotirios' granddaughter Marina taking over the company in 1973 and grandsons Gianni, Paolo and Nicola Bulgari taking over the company the first two in 1966 and the last in 1984. In the 1990s, his great-grandson CEO Francesco Trapani expanded the brand by launching fragrances, making Bulgari known worldwide as a luxury brand.

In 2011, Louis Vuitton acquired the company for €4.3 billion, with the Bulgari family retaining the majority stake in LVMH. The company is currently estimated to be worth 7.49 billion euros. Paolo Bulgari (1937–2026), an Italian businessman and grandson of Sotirios Voulgaris, was the chairman of the company Bvlgari.

== Sources ==
- Cottini, Luca (2018). The Art of Objects: The Birth of Italian Industrial Culture, 1878-1928. University of Toronto Press. ISBN 978-1-4875-0283-6.
- Ricca, M.; Robins, R. (2012). Meta-Luxury: Brands and the Culture of Excellence. Springer. ISBN 978-1-137-00566-3.
- Donze, Pierre-Yves; Fujioka, Rika (2017). Global Luxury: Organizational Change and Emerging Markets since the 1970s. Springer. ISBN 978-981-10-5236-1.

== See also ==
- Voulgaris
