= Bulgari =

Italian luxury fashion house

Bulgari S.p.A.

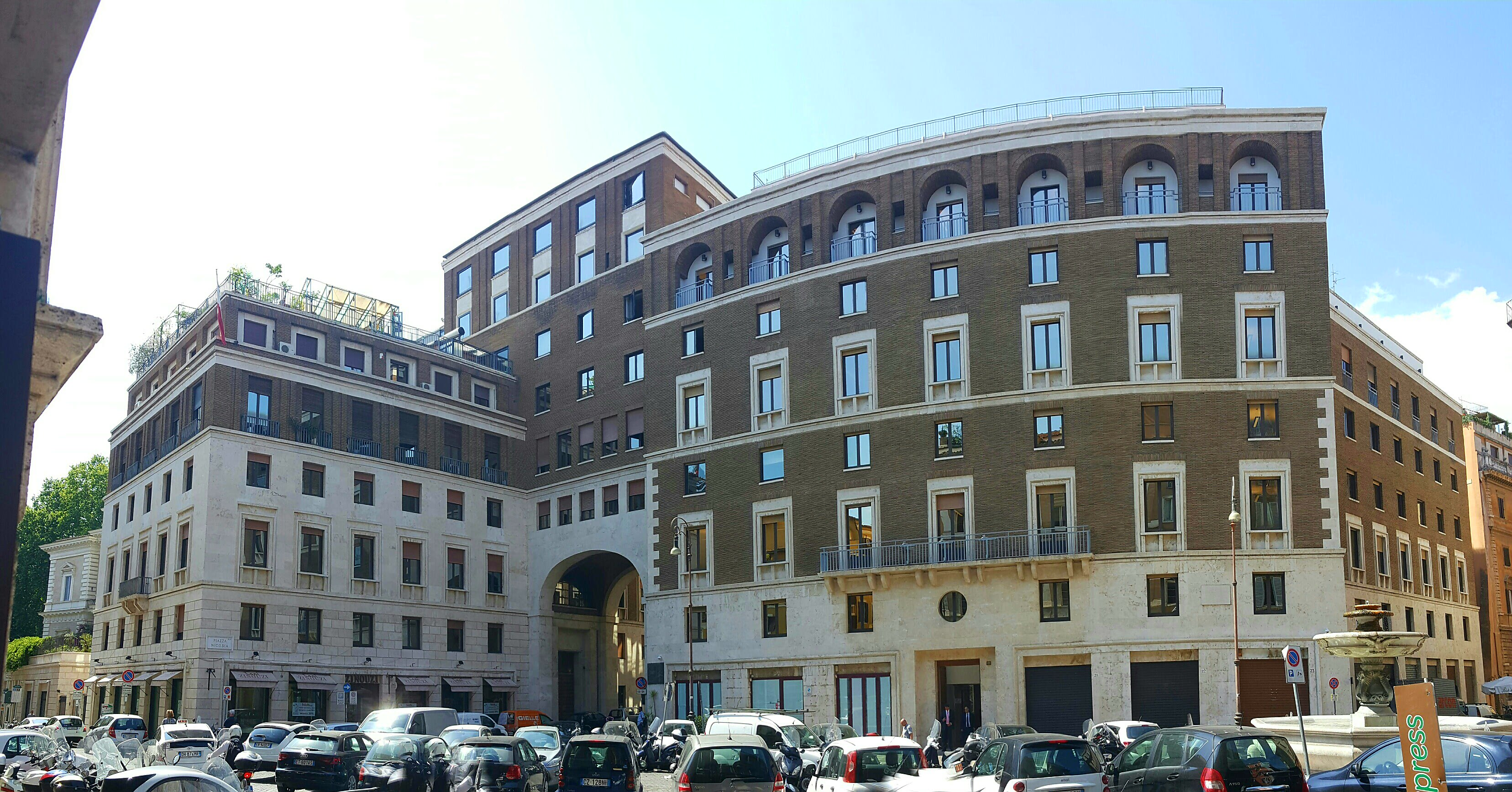
- Headquarters in Rome
- Type: Subsidiary società per azioni
- Industry: Luxury goods
- Founded: 1884; 142 years ago
- Founder: Sotirios Voulgaris
- Headquarters: Rome, Italy
- Key people: Jean-Christophe Babin (CEO)
- Products: Jewellery; watches; accessories; fragrances; cosmetics; hotels
- Revenue: €2.3 billion (2025)
- Operating income: €82.09 million (2023)
- Net income: €84 million (2023)
- Total assets: €1.490 billion (end 2010)
- Total equity: €934.0 million (end 2010)
- Number of employees: 6,000 (end 2025)
- Parent: LVMH
- Website: www.bulgari.com

Bulgari S.p.A. (/ˈbʊlɡəri/, Italian: [ˈbulɡari]; stylized as BVLGARI) is an Italian luxury fashion house founded in 1884 and known for its jewellery, watches, fragrances, accessories, and leather goods. Headquartered in Rome, the company was acquired by the French conglomerate LVMH in 2011, thus becoming one of the latter's subsidiaries.

The silversmith and founder of the company Sotirios Voulgaris (Greek: Σωτήριος Βούλγαρης, Italian: Sotirio Bulgari) began his career as a jewellery vendor at his family's shop in Ottoman Epirus (now in Greece). During the 1880s, the family moved to Rome, where in 1884 Sotirios launched his company. Over the years, Bulgari became an international brand, evolving into a notable player in the luxury market, with an established network of stores worldwide. While the majority of design, production and marketing is overseen and executed by Bulgari, the company does, at times, partner with other entities. For example, Bulgari eyewear is produced through a licensing agreement with Luxottica, and Bulgari formed a joint venture with Marriott International in 2001 to launch its hotel brand, Bulgari Hotels & Resorts, a collection of properties and resort destinations around the world.

== Logo ==
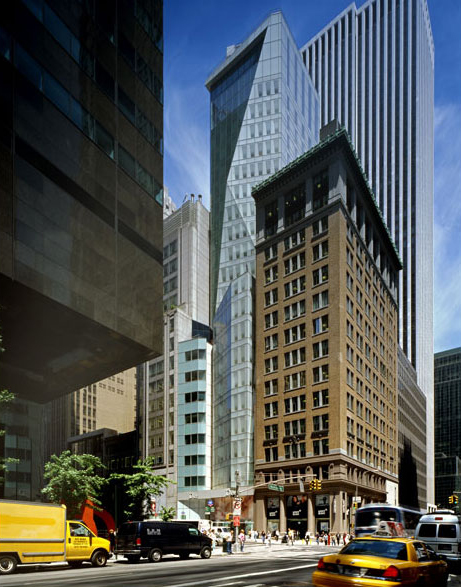
BVLGARI's overseas headquarters within the LVMH Tower in Midtown Manhattan, seen here with its bluish, gem-shaped, angulated glass façade

The trademark of the company, usually written BVLGARI in the classical Latin alphabet, is derived from the surname of the company's founder, Sotirios Voulgaris (Greek: Σωτήριος Βούλγαρης, pronounced [soˈtiri.os ˈvulɣaris]; 1857–1932).

The BVLGARI logo was used for the first time in 1934, when its gilded brass letters graced the central doorway of the Via Condotti flagship store. In reference to ancient Rome, the "U" was replaced with the letter "V". Since then, the trademark is stylized BVLGARI in the classical Latin alphabet.

== History ==
=== From its origins through the 1940s ===
The Voulgaris were a silversmithing family from the Ottoman-ruled village of Paramythia, Epirus (now part of Greece). Whether or not they share the same paternal line with the Voulgaris family of Corfu is unclear, but Count Stefanos Voulgaris denied that the two are genealogically related. According to chronicles of the Voulgaris family written in Venetian Corfu, the Voulgaris family of Saint Spyridon of Corfu descended from the royal figures of "barbarian" peoples who settled in Moesia near the Balkan – Haemus mountains, located in Bulgaria", including Prince Stefan Lazarević and Khan Tervel, "kings of the Triballi, in the 16th century testament of the family, becoming such by taking refugee in the Venetian island Corfu.

The founder of the Bulgari brand was Sotirios Voulgaris (Σωτήριος Βούλγαρης), who was born in Paramythia, in March 1857; he originated from the Aromanian village of Kalarrytes, which was the largest center for silversmithing in the Balkans. He was one of eleven children of Georgios Voulgaris (1823–1889) and his Vlachophone Greek mother Eleni Strouggari. In 1881, Sotirios and his family moved to Rome, where in 1884 he opened his second jewellery store on via Sistina 85 (their first shop in Naples closed after burglaries). In 1888, he married Aromanian Eleni Basio, with whom he had six children: Constantine-Georgios (1889–1973), Leonidas-Georgios (1890–1966), Maria-Athena (1891–1976), Sofia (1893–1908), Alexandra (1895–1984) and Spyridon (1897–1932); Leonidas-Georgios is the father of the current chairman of the company, Paolo Bulgari. In 1905, he unveiled the Via Condotti shop that would become the company's flagship. In its early years, Bulgari was known for silver pieces that borrowed elements from Byzantine and Islamic art, combining them with floral motifs. At the time, Paris was the apex of fashion and creativity, and its trends influenced Sotirio's designs for decades: jewels of the early '20s were characterised by platinum Art Deco settings while those of the '30s featured geometric diamond motifs—sometimes set in combination with coloured gemstones. Convertible jewels were also popular during the time. One of Bulgari's major pieces was the Trombino, a small trumpet-shaped ring whose name derives from the Italian tromba; dating from the 1930s, it is defined by a prominent central gemstone set in a broad, tapering band.

In 1932, Sotirio died, leaving the business to his two sons, Giorgio (1890–1966) and Costantino (1889–1973), who each had a keen interest in precious stones and jewels. During the Second World War, most new jewellery was crafted out of gold, as gems were scarce, and designs became more naturalistic. As the 1940s came to a close, Bulgari introduced Serpenti bracelet-watches.

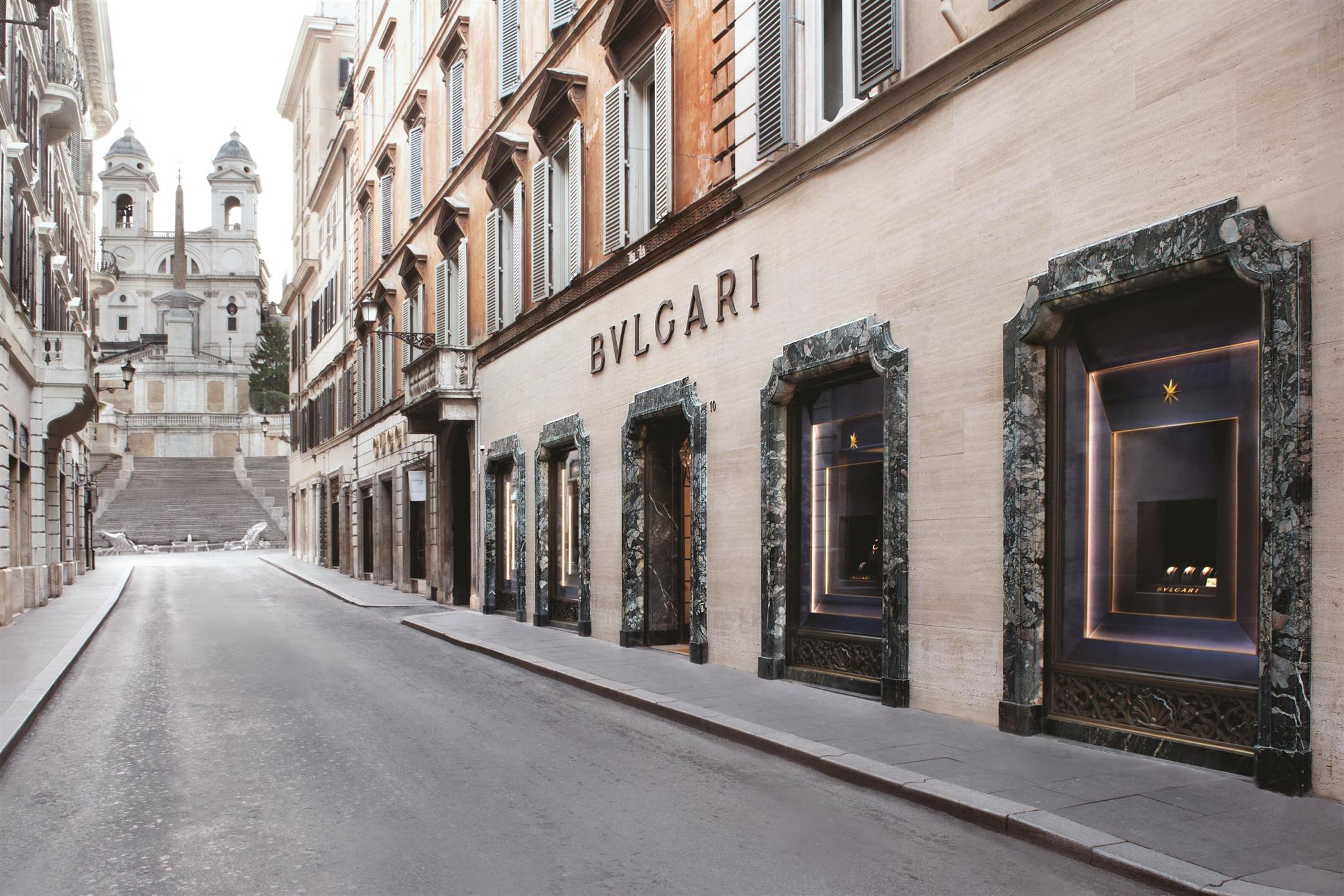
Bulgari Via Condotti flagship store

=== 1950s and 1960s: Colour revolution and Dolce Vita ===
In the 1950s, some of Bulgari's best-known clients included Elizabeth Taylor, Anna Magnani, Ingrid Bergman and Gina Lollobrigida as Rome earned a reputation as "Hollywood on the Tiber" with the Cinecittà studios.

At the same time, Bulgari went to a new style. The post-war boom saw a return to precious materials, particularly white metals covered in diamonds. In the 1950s, Bulgari launched its first floral brooches—called en tremblant because of their trembling diamond corollas. At the end of the 1950s, Bulgari began to establish its motifs, introducing structured, symmetrical shapes in yellow gold set with brilliant gems—chosen for their colour rather than intrinsic value. Among these multi-hued jewels, cabochon cuts were another innovation. These new pieces were a significant departure from classical Parisian design.

Bulgari further demonstrated its craftsmanship in the 1960s with intricate designs like the Serpenti collection, where colorful enamel and stones, including rubies and diamonds, were meticulously fitted into the serpent's scales to create a vibrant and detailed finish.

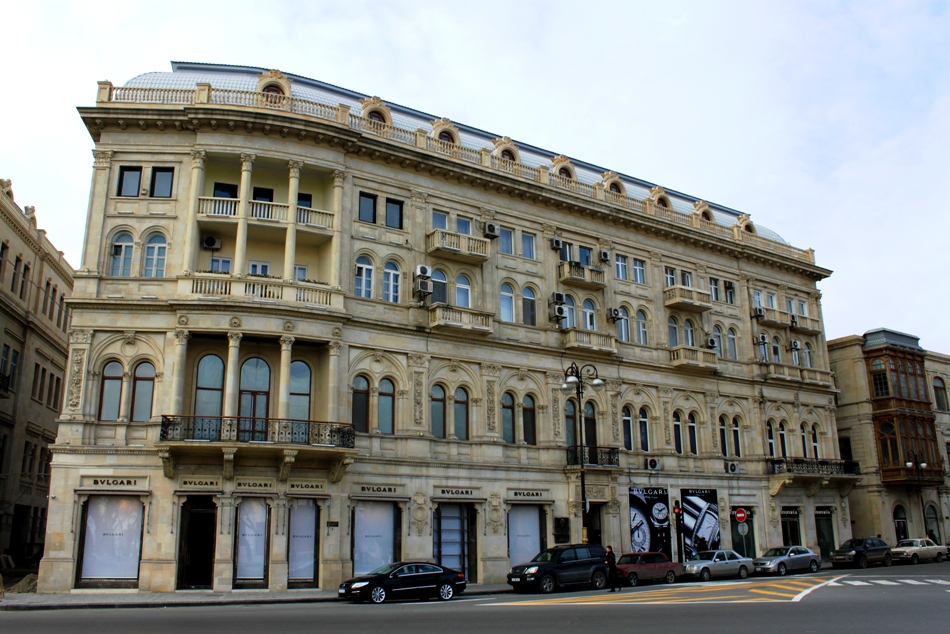
A Bulgari shop in Baku, Azerbaijan

After Giorgio's death in 1966, his son Gianni led the company as co-chief executive with his cousin Marina. Designer and heir to the jewelry legacy, Marina Bulgari, also known as Marina B, died on 14 February 2024 in Rome, at the age of 93.

=== 1970s: Eclectic creativity and global expansion ===
During the 1970s, Bulgari stores opened in New York, Geneva, Monte Carlo and Paris. This era marks the beginning of the Group's international expansion, with Gianni as chairman and CEO. A number of new motifs made their debut as well—jewels became recognisable for their angular forms, strong colours, oval elements with cabochons, chains and maxi sautoirs, while the predominant use of yellow gold made precious pieces feel all the more wearable, and became known as a Bulgari trademark. In 1977, Bulgari entered the world of horlogerie with the launch of the BVLGARI BVLGARI watch. At the time, Gianni led a complete overhaul of the company, focusing on product design.

=== 1980s: Prêt-à-porter jewellery ===
In the early 1980s, to oversee all production of Bulgari watches, Bulgari Time was founded in Switzerland. In 1984, Paolo and Nicola Bulgari, Giorgio's sons, became chairman and vice-chairman, respectively, while their nephew, Francesco Trapani, became chief executive officer. In 1985, Gianni resigned as CEO and in 1987, he left the family business after selling his one-third stake in the company to his brothers Nicola and Paolo.

=== From the 1990s to the new millennium ===
Bulgari diversified its brand in 1993 with the launch of its first fragrance, Eau Parfumée au The Vert and the founding of Bulgari Parfums in Switzerland to oversee the creation and production of all perfumes. In 1995, Bulgari pushed ahead with an aggressive programme for growth, becoming listed on the Milan Stock Exchange for the first time. In 1996, the brand launched its first accessories collection, beginning with silk scarves before developing a range of leather accessories and eyewear. In 1999, the brand launched the B.zero1 ring.

=== 21st century ===
The year 2000 was the beginning of an increasingly aggressive period of verticalization for Bulgari, with the acquisition of the luxury watchmaking brands Daniel Roth and Gérald Genta, followed by the takeover of the jewellery firm Crova and of other companies that specialised in leather goods and watchmaking. The opening of the first Bulgari Hotel in Milan in 2004 further confirmed the expansion strategy of the brand, and was the result of a joint venture with Luxury Group, a division of Marriott International. In 2009, Bulgari celebrated its 125th anniversary with a retrospective of the brand's history, held in Rome at Palazzo delle Esposizioni. That same year, the snake—a motif that appeared in Bulgari collections from the 1960s—re-emerged as the emblem of the Serpenti collection.

In 2011, Bulgari signed a strategic alliance with LVMH Moet Hennessy Louis Vuitton SA, the world's leading luxury group. The agreement was based on a stock transfer of the Bulgari family's shares in Bulgari S.p.A. to LVMH, an all-share deal for €4.3 billion ($6.0 billion). Under the deal, the Bulgari family sold their 50.4 per cent controlling stake in exchange for 3 per cent of LVMH, thereby becoming the second-biggest family shareholder behind the Arnaults in LVMH. The takeover doubled the size of LVMH's watches and jewellery unit, which at the time of the acquisition included Tag Heuer timepieces and De Beers diamond necklaces. The acquisition concluded on 4 October 2011 as Bulgari was delisted from the Borsa Italiana.

In February 2013, Jean-Christophe Babin, formerly CEO of TAG Heuer, became CEO of Bulgari.

In 2014, Bulgari celebrated the 130th anniversary of the brand. To mark the occasion, the shop at Via Condotti 10 was "reimagined" by the architect Peter Marino, and reopened. On the same day, the brand donated €1.5 million to the city of Rome for the restoration of the Spanish Steps. A few months after the Grand Opening, the DOMVS was inaugurated in the redesigned Bulgari boutique, creating a gallery space to house of Bulgari's Heritage Collection.

In 2017, Bulgari opened a new jewellery manufacturing headquarters in Valenza. The largest in Europe, with a total area of 14,000 square metres (150,000 sq ft), the Manufacture has been given a Gold LEED (Leadership in Energy & Environmental Design) certification for sustainability in its design. The facility was built over the former home of the first goldsmith in Valenza, Francesco Caramora. The buildings follow the model of a Roman domus, and are built around a central courtyard.

In March 2024, the Bvlgari jewellery house officialized and announced the creation of the Fondazione Bvlgari, an institution that is an extension of the brand's founding values, particularly its commitment to safeguarding historical heritage.

== Products ==
=== Jewellery ===
Bulgari's jewellery collections include B.zero1, Divas' Dream, Serpenti, BVLGARI BVLGARI, Parentesi, and a bridal line.

=== Watches ===
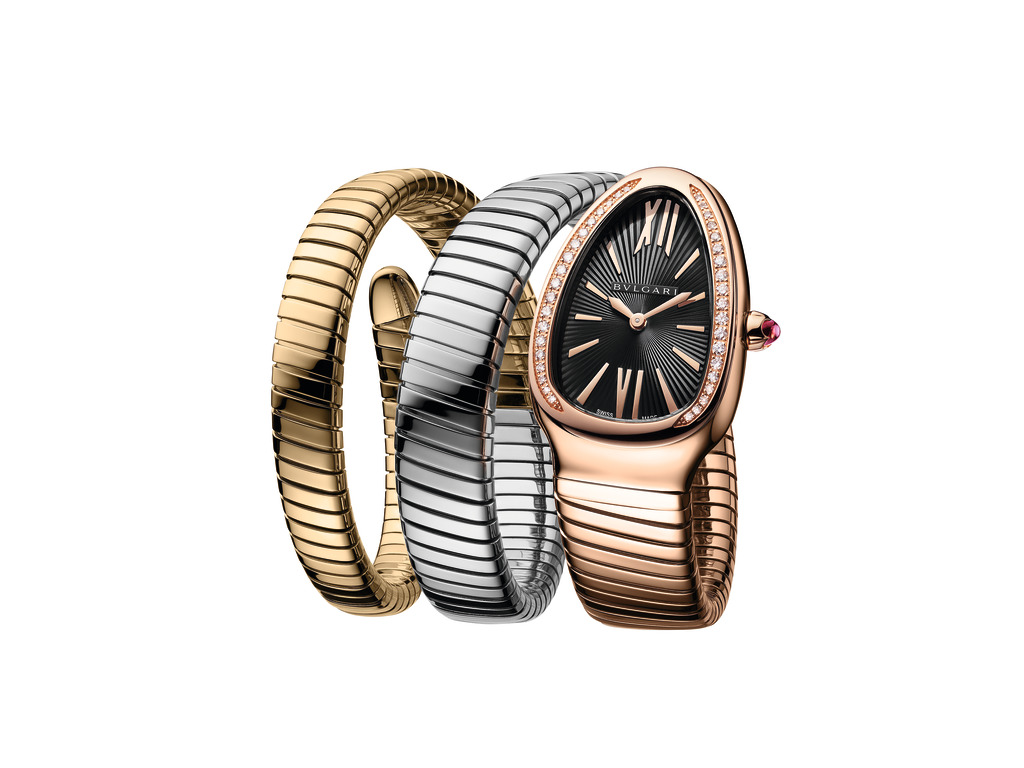
Bulgari watch

Bulgari's watch collections include Octo, BVLGARI BVLGARI, Diagono and Haute Horlogerie creations for men, and LVCEA, Serpenti, Divas' Dream, BVLGARI BVLGARI, B.zero1 and High Jewellery timepieces for women. It mixes Italian design and Swiss watchmaking. The company's Swiss subsidiary, Bulgari Haute Horlogerie SA, is responsible for Bulgari's watch production. It was founded in 1980 and is headquartered in Neuchâtel. Bulgari Haute Horlogerie SA employs about 500 people.

=== Fragrances ===
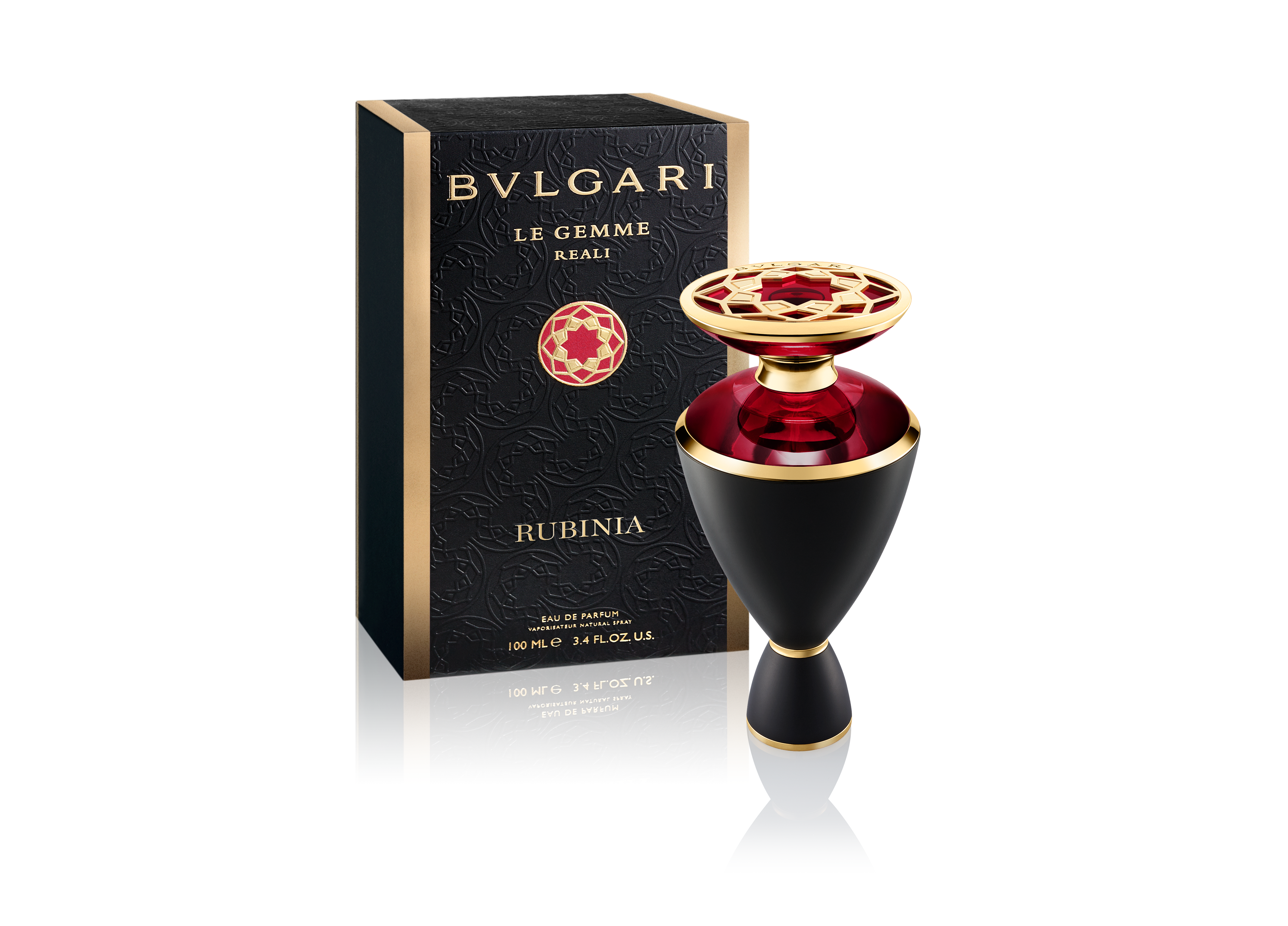
Bulgari perfume Le Gemme

Two notable Bulgari fragrances are Bulgari Black (1998) created by Annick Ménardo and Omnia (fragrance) (2003) created by Alberto Morillas.

Among the many others are Eau Parfumée au Thé Vert (1992) created by Jean-Claude Ellena, Aqva Pour Homme, Bvlgari Pour Homme Soir, Goldea, Splendida, BVLGARI Man, Aqua, the Classics, Blv Pour Homme, BVLGARI Le Gemme, and Eau Parfumée.

=== Accessories and leather goods ===
The creation of Bulgari accessories and leather goods is handled in the Bulgari atelier in Florence, and twice a year presents its collections at Milan Fashion Week.

== Bulgari hotels and resorts ==
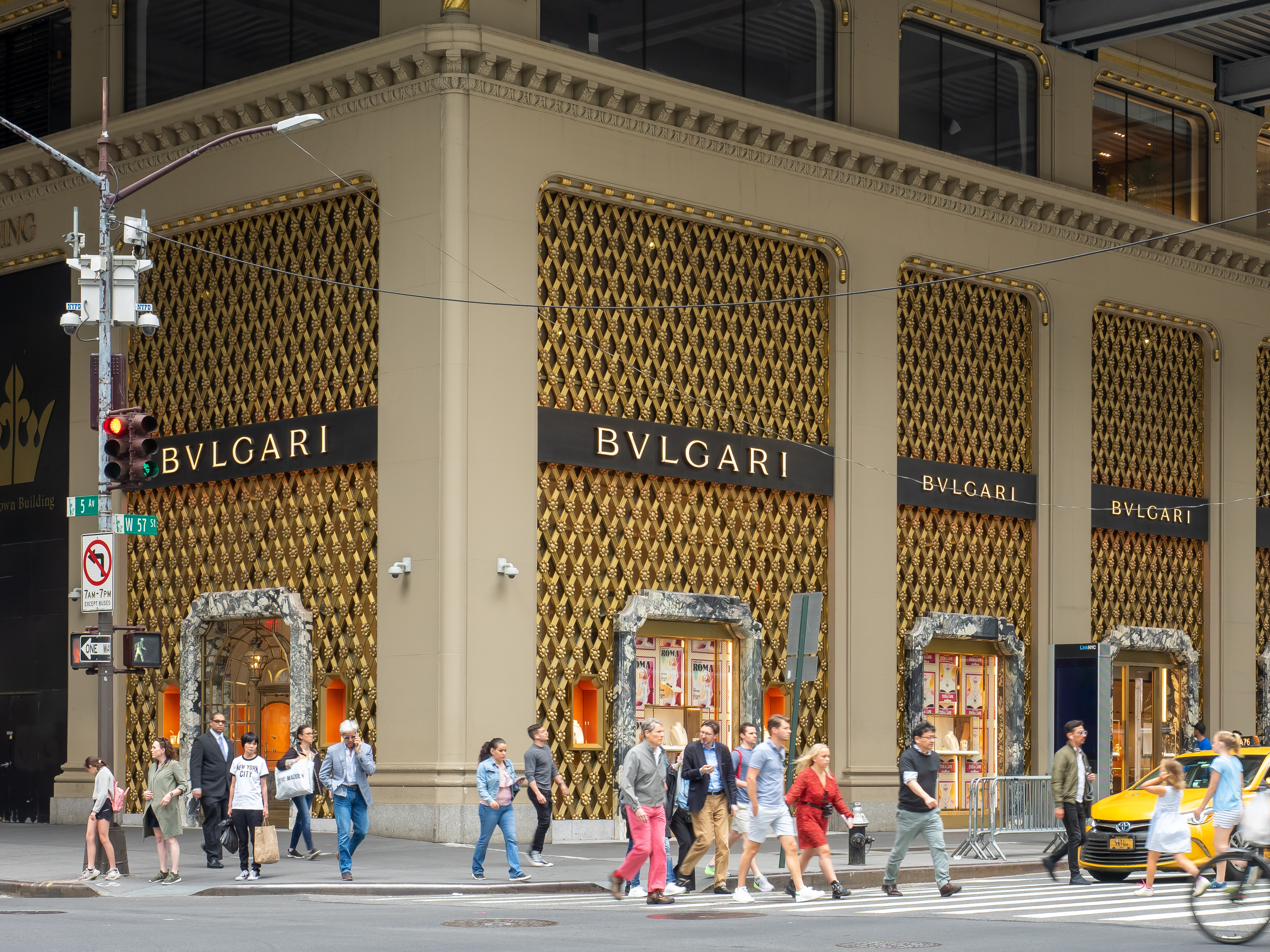
Bulgari flagship, Fifth Avenue, Manhattan

In 2001, Bulgari formed a joint venture with The Ritz-Carlton Hotel Company, a hotel brand owned by Marriott International, to launch Bulgari Hotels & Resorts, a collection of hotels and resort destinations around the world.

Although operated by The Ritz-Carlton Company, Bulgari hotels and resorts do not participate in the Marriott Bonvoy loyalty program, meaning guests can neither earn nor redeem points for free bookings. It is currently the only Marriott brand to practice this policy, following the inclusion of The Ritz-Carlton Reserve properties to the program in April 2022.

=== Accommodations ===
==== Historical ====
Year	Accommodation	North America	Europe	Middle E. & Africa	Asia & Pacific	Caribbean Latin Am.	Total
2004	Properties		1				1
2004	Rooms		58				58
2005	Properties		1				1
2005	Rooms		58				58
2006	Properties		1		1		2
2006	Rooms		58		59		117
2007	Properties		1		1		2
2007	Rooms		58		59		117
2008	Properties		1		1		2
2008	Rooms		58		59		117
2009	Properties		1		1		2
2009	Rooms		58		59		117
2010	Properties		1		1		2
2010	Rooms		58		59		117
2011	Properties		1		1		2
2011	Rooms		58		59		117
2012	Properties		2		1		3
2012	Rooms		143		59		202
2013	Properties		2		1		3
2013	Rooms		143		59		202
2014	Properties		2		1		3
2014	Rooms		143		59		202

==== From 2015 ====
Year	Accommodation	North America	Europe	Middle E. & Africa	Asia & Pacific	Caribbean Latin Am.	Total
2015	Properties		2		1		3
2015	Rooms		143		59		202
2016	Properties		2		1		3
2016	Rooms		143		59		202
2017	Properties		2	1	2		5
2017	Rooms		143	120	179		442
2018	Properties		2	1	3		6
2018	Rooms		143	120	260		523
2019	Properties		2	1	3		6
2019	Rooms		143	120	260		523
2020	Properties		2	1	3		6
2020	Rooms		143	120	260		523
2021	Properties		3	1	3		7
2021	Rooms		222	121	260		603
2022	Properties		3	1	3		7
2022	Rooms		222	121	260		603
2023	Properties		4	1	4		9
2023	Rooms		332	121	358		811

=== Properties ===
#	Hotel Name	Hotel Location	Country	Opening Year
1	Bulgari Hotel Beijing	Beijing	China	2017
2	Bulgari Hotel London	London	United Kingdom	2012
3	Bulgari Hotel Milano	Milan	Italy	2004
4	Bulgari Hotel Paris	Paris	France	2021
5	Bulgari Hotel Roma	Rome	Italy	2023
6	Bulgari Hotel Shanghai	Shanghai	China	2018
7	Bulgari Hotel Tokyo	Tokyo	Japan	2023
8	Bulgari Resort Bali	Bali	Indonesia	2006
9	Bulgari Resort Dubai	Dubai	United Arab Emirates	2017

== Shops ==
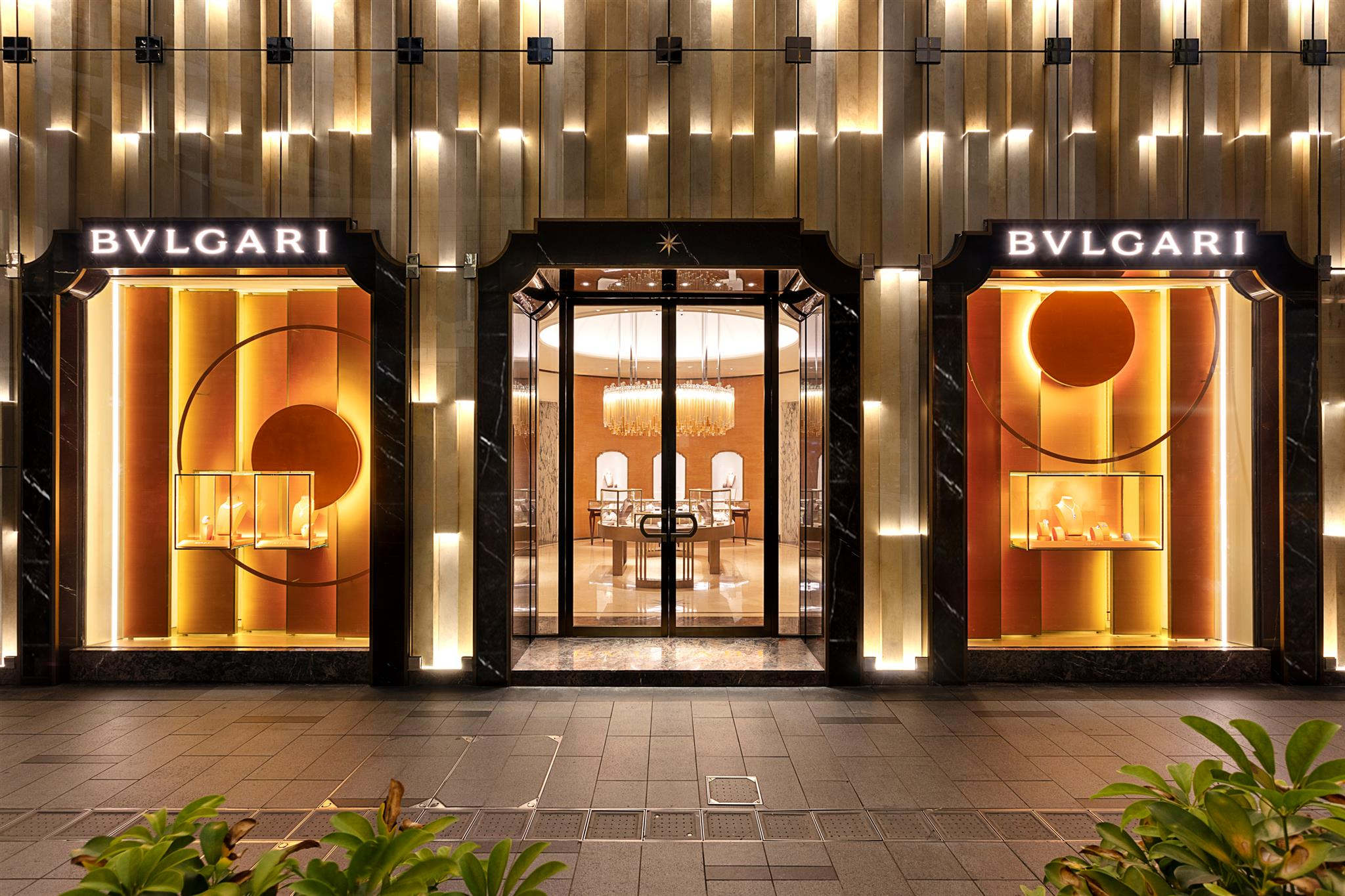
Bulgari Hong Kong Boutique

Bulgari has about 300 stores. The largest is the 10-storey Bulgari Ginza Tower in Tokyo, 940 square metres (10,100 sq ft) of retail floor space, including a restaurant and lounge bar.

North American Bulgari boutiques and distributors are found in Aruba, Bahamas, Canada, Cayman Islands, Costa Rica, Curaçao, Haiti, Mexico, Puerto Rico, Saint Barthélemy, Turks and Caicos, U.S. Virgin Islands, and the United States of which there 59 locations within the following states: Arizona (1), California (15), Connecticut (1), Florida (9), Georgia (1), Hawaii (1), Illinois (2), Maryland (1), Massachusetts (2), Michigan (1), Nevada (4), New Jersey (3), New York (8), North Dakota (1), Pennsylvania (2), Texas (6), and Washington D.C. (1).

South American Bulgari distributors are found in Bogotá, Lima, Margarita Island, Quito and São Paulo.

== Bulgari Art Award ==
The Bulgari Art Award is an annual art award in partnership with the Art Gallery of New South Wales, Sydney, Australia. Sponsored by Bulgari, the $50,000 acquisitive cash award plus $30,000 residency in Italy is presented to mid-career Australian artists.

The winners include:

- 2012 – Michael Zavros
- 2013 – Jon Cattapan
- 2014 – Daniel Boyd
- 2015 – Ildiko Kovacs
- 2016 – Jude Rae
- 2017 – Tomislav Nikolic
- 2019 – Nusra Latif Qureshi
