= Beatrice Bulgari =

Italian costume designer (born 1951)

- Born: Beatrice Bordone; 2 April 1951 (age 74); Syracuse, Sicily, Italy
- Occupation: Costume designer
- Known for: Designing the costumes for Cinema Paradiso
- Spouse: Nicola Bulgari

Beatrice Bulgari (née Bordone; born 2 April 1951) is an Italian costume designer, best known for designing the costumes for the Giuseppe Tornatore film Cinema Paradiso (1988). She is married to the Italian billionaire Nicola Bulgari.
