= Giorgio Bulgari =

Italian businessman (1890–1966)

- Born: 5 May 1890; Rome, Italy
- Died: 6 March 1966 (aged 75)
- Resting place: Protestant Cemetery, Rome
- Occupation: Businessman
- Children: Lia Bulgari; Gianni Bulgari; Paolo Bulgari; Nicola Bulgari
- Father: Sotirio Bulgari

Giorgio Bulgari (5 May 1890 – 6 March 1966) was an Italian businessman, son of Sotirios Bulgari, the founder of the luxury brand Bulgari.

== Early life ==
Giorgio Bulgari was born on 5 May 1890, the second of three sons of Sotirios Bulgari (born Boulgaris) and his wife Elena.

== Career ==
Giorgio and his elder brother Costantino Bulgari (born 1889) learned silversmithing and jewellery making from their father, which they took over on his death in 1932.

== Personal life ==
He had four children; Lia in 1933, Gianni in 1935, Paolo in 1937, and Nicola in 1941.

He died on 6 March 1966, and is buried in the Protestant Cemetery, Rome.
