= SS Bulgaria (1945) =

History
- Name: Empire Flamborough (1945–46); Vindeggen (1946–48); Bulgaria (1948–76)
- Owner: Ministry of Transport (1945–46); Rederiet Vindeggen A/S (1946–48); Navigation Maritime Bulgare (1948–76)
- Operator: Christian Østberg (1946–48); Navigation Maritime Bulgare (1948–76)
- Port of registry: London, United Kingdom (1946); Oslo, Norway (1946–48); Varna, Bulgaria (1948–76)
- Builder: William Pickersgill & Sons Ltd
- Yard number: 277
- Launched: 19 November 1945
- Completed: March 1946
- Out of service: 1976
- Identification: Code Letters LLNP (1946–48); IMO number: 5054965 (1960s–76)
- Fate: Scrapped July 1976

General characteristics
- Type: Cargo ship
- Tonnage: 4,191 GRT; 2,262 NRT; 7,351 DWT
- Length: 401 ft 0 in (122.22 m) overall; 384 ft 2 in (117.09 m) between perpendiculars
- Beam: 53 ft 7 in (16.33 m)
- Depth: 23 ft 0 in (7.01 m)
- Propulsion: Triple expansion steam engine, single screw propeller
- Speed: 11 knots (20 km/h)

Bulgaria was a 4,191 GRT cargo ship that was built as Empire Flamborough in 1945 by William Pickersgill & Sons Ltd, Sunderland, County Durham, United Kingdom for the Ministry of Transport (MoT). She was sold to Norway in 1946 and renamed Vindeggen. A further sale to Bulgaria in 1948 saw her renamed Bulgaria. She served until 1976 when she was scrapped.

== Description ==
The ship was a cargo ship built in 1943 by William Pickersgill & Sons Ltd, Sunderland, County Durham, United Kingdom. She was yard number 277.

The ship was 401 ft 0 in (122.22 m) long overall, 384 ft 2 in (117.09 m) between perpendiculars, with a beam of 53 feet 7 inches (16.33 m). She had a depth of 23 feet 0 inches (7.01 m). She was assessed at 4,191 GRT, 2,262 NRT, 7,351 DWT.

The ship was propelled by a triple expansion steam engine, which had cylinders of 23½ inches (60 cm), 37½ inches (95 cm) and 68 inches (170 cm) diameter by 48 inches (120 cm) stroke. The engine was built by John Brown & Co Ltd, Clydebank, Renfrewshire. It drove a single screw propeller. Supplied with steam from two oil-fired boilers, the engine could propel the ship at a speed of 11 knots (20 km/h).

== History ==
The ship was built by William Pickersgill & Sons Ltd, Sunderland, County Durham in 1943 for the MoT. She was launched on 19 November 1945 and completed in March 1946. Her port of registry was Sunderland. She was to have been placed under the management of Galbraith, Pembroke & Co Ltd, London.

Empire Flamborough was sold to Rederiet Vindeggen A/S of Norway for NOK4,900,000 and renamed Vindeggen. She was operated under the management of Christian Østberg. Her port of registry was Oslo. The Code Letters LLNP were allocated. In 1948, Vindeggen was sold for NOK6,262,000 to Navigation Maritime Bulgare, Bulgaria and was renamed Bulgaria. With the introduction of IMO Numbers in the late 1960s, Bulgaria was allocated the IMO Number 5054965. She served until 1976 when she was sold for scrapping at $65 per tonne. Bulgaria was scrapped by Brodospas at Split, Yugoslavia. Scrapping started in July 1976.
