= Bugarštica =

Form of epic and ballad oral poetry

Bugarštica (pronounced [bûɡaːrʃtitsa] or [buɡǎrʃtitsa]), originally known as Bugaršćica, is a form of epic and ballad oral poetry, which was popular among South Slavs mainly in Dalmatia and Bay of Kotor from the 15th until the 18th century, sung in long verses of mostly fifteen and sixteen syllables with a caesura after the seventh and eighth syllable, respectively.

== Etymology ==
The term bugaršćica and bugaršćina for song and bugariti for singing were first recorded in 1550s by Petar Hektorović and published in Fishing and Fishermen's Talk (1568), in his reference to two songs he collected from fishermen from the Adriatic island of Hvar. Juraj Baraković recorded bugarskice, while Ivan Gundulić bugarkinje. In Central Croatia were sometimes named as popijevka or popevka. The form bugarštica is a 19th-century invention as the contemporary Serbo-Croatian standard language does not have "consonantal cluster šć", being more a technical term, but since 1980s bugaršćica is also being used in the scientific literature because it is more appropriate for the historical context.

The origination and etymology are still uncertain. There exist three predominant theories regarding the etymology of bugarštica:

- Researchers such as Vatroslav Jagić, Tomo Maretić, and Matija Murko, posit that it was derived from the root bugar "Bulgarian", indicating the direction of spread of bugarštica from a contact area between late medieval Bulgaria and Serbia towards the Adriatic coast. Other names, such as pjesan bugarska which some scholars interpret as "Bulgarian song", or sarpskim načinom "Serbian manner", were applied to these songs.
- The second considered by scholars such as Ivan Slamnig, Ilya Golenishchev-Kutuzov, Nada Milošević-Đorđević, and others, the term developed from the Latin vulgaricus or lingua vulgaris "common people's language", or carmen vulgare "folk song", denoting ballads composed in the spoken Slavic vernacular in Dalmatia, as opposed to those composed in the literary Latin. The change of the initial v into b could be due to folk etymology, associating vulgare with the similarly sounding Slavic root bugar. Slamnig also points out that vulgare was alternatively spelled as bulgare, when it referred to the Slavic language of the Adriatic Coast.
- According to the third, which is partly related to the second, considered by Đuro Daničić, Vladan Nedić, Miroslav Pantić, Josip Kekez, and others would be from verb bugariti meaning "sad singing", possibly deriving from Middle Latin bucculare and boccalone meaning to "start singing" and "shouting, whining". It was also common in Istria and the island of Krk meaning "loud" or "monotonal" singing. As it was a common term for singing nevertheless of the number of syllables Nenad Ljubinković argued that the term is mistakenly used for long verse songs and rather proposed the term "songs of the long verse", but such a term is too general and the bugarštica makes a genre of a very specific style.
- Additionally, Valtazar Bogišić and Petar Skok proposed a relation to the Albanian, Aromanian, Turkish and South Slavic music instruments bulgari and bugarija, but such assumption is dismissed because there is no evidence the songs were performed with an instrument.

== Origin ==
As historical events spread and reflect easily in both oral and written poetry it is problematic to directly relate their origin with historical figures of the different royal court, toponyms, and nationality, as well as at the early times did not exist today's national separatism.

In the scholarship exist various theories:

- Since the late 19th century some scholars argued partial (Jagić, Bogišić) or complete (Asmus Soerensen) origin from a Serbian continental, or Hungarian controlled territory (Syrmia), or medieval Bulgarian-Serbian border, and that from there spread to the Adriatic coast to the South. It is primarily based on the historical content. Mainly supported by Serbian scholars like Pavle Popović, Nada Milošević-Đorđević and others, in the same fashion, Serbian literary historian Miroslav Pantić, who recognized, translated and published the earliest 1497 poem from Southern Italy in 1977, described it as a Serbian poem and argued that its performers came from Serbian Despotate. However, linguistical, onomastic and historical analysis by Croatian linguist Petar Šimunović (1984) dismissed Pantić because, among others, the language was Shtokavian-Chakavian with Ikavian accent identical to Slavomolisano dialect of Molise Croats which implies an area of origination between rivers Cetina and Neretva in Dalmatia. The theory has a lack of evidence to support the assumption the songs were sung so far in the North, of the lyrical and historical migration, and it is very doubtful that the servants from the same region Slavicized in such a fashion personal names as well as commemorated Hungarian historical figures.
- In the same time Jagić, Bogišić, Franz Miklosich, Ilya Golenishchev-Kutuzov, Josip Kekez, Petar Šimunović, and others argue partial or complete Western and Southern Croatian origin in Dalmatia and near Bosnia and Herzegovina, on a former territory of Chakavian (with some Kajkavian traces) and Western Shtokavian-Ikavian dialects. Jagić considered that often use of terms ugrski, Ugrin and Ugričić ("Hungarian"), especially in Dubrovnik and Bay of Kotor, was a common political adjective for all heroes who fought against the Ottomans.
- Bulgarian ethnographer Krste Misirkov in the early 20th century argued that the style of this songs is a result of the Bulgarian musical influence during the Middle Ages over the Serbian and Croatian epic poetry. This hypothesis is hard to verify, as there are no records of medieval Bulgarian epic songs. Maurice Bowra argued that the sixteen-syllable line of bugarštica was of Bulgarian origin "since the Bulgarians still use eight-syllable lines, which may be the two halves of an old sixteen-syllable".
- Due to feudal figures and customs some scholars argued to not have been of common folk origin yet feudal nobility.

Maja Bošković-Stulli in 2004 synthesis concluded that the predominant area of origin was in the South near the Adriatic coast, with a style partly recognizable in Stećak inscriptions, and was influenced by Latin ballad poetry as well as the content from the Latin and Hungarian historical chronicles.

== History ==
It is considered to be older epic layer of South Slavic oral tradition which existed probably before the 15th century and disappeared by the middle of the 18th century. The earliest known poem which can be classified as bugarštica was recorded in 1497 by Italian poet Rogeri de Pacienza, included in his work Lo Balzino, who was present when it was performed after a Kolo (dance) in honour to Queen Isabella del Balzo by thirty Slavs, men, women and children who had settled in the village of Gioia del Colle, Southern Italy. It tells about the imprisonment of Hungarian voivode Janko (John Hunyadi) by Despot of Serbia Đurađ Branković in Smederevo Fortress, which happened in 1448.

During the 16th–18th centuries all of them were collected in Dalmatia and the Bay of Kotor, with an exception in Central Croatia (with Kajkavian dialect features). First collector Petar Hektorović recorded fishermen Paskoj and Nikola singing them as a way to spend the rowing time faster. In his writing to Mikša Pelegrinović, it is evident that these songs were commonly known, there was also other and older way of singing, and Hektorović even assumed those fishermen learned them from someone else. Other poets and priests who collected them are Juraj Baraković, Juraj Križanić, Petar Zrinski, Nikola Ohumućević, Đuro Matijašević, Julije Balović, Andrija Zmajević, and Josip Betondić, among others. They were published in the late 19th century by Franz Miklosich, Alexander Hilferding, and most completely by Valtazar Bogišić in Narodne pjesme iz starijih, najviše primorskih zapisa (1878), about 85 bugarštica songs in total. By the 19th century bugarštica vanished as a from, most probably due to popularity of younger epic songs in decasyllabic meter.

== Characteristics ==
The songs are sung in long verses of mostly fifteen and sixteen syllables with a caesura after the seventh and eighth syllable, respectively. Sometimes have an addition, mostly in six syllables. Although some bugarštica's content is closely related to historiography, especially to the history of Mauro Orbini's Il regno de gli Slavi (1601) and Ludovik Crijević Tuberon's Writings on the Present Age (Commentaria temporum suorum) (1603), they are generally deemed to be oral songs, transmitted orally. The bugarštica's themes vary not only in the scope of this type but also in respect of decasyllabic songs. Although mostly have epic and heroic themes, its structures tend to be of ballad poetry, which includes summarized storytelling, with a sudden beginning of an action, with dialogue and graded repetition.

In the scholarship, some like Milovan Gavazzi and Bogišić viewed the sixteen syllables to be composed of two octosyllables and hence was argued relationship with octosyllabic songs. Other scholars were rather critical of such a metric approach and rather considered that bugarštica should be viewed as one unity. Nevertheless, the comparison of a bugarštica, provisionally titled "Kraljević Marko i brat mu Andrijaš", written by Hektorović in 1556 with three songs by Burgenland Croats found almost identical similarity in the balladic intonation, use of diminutives, and content. The similarity with them was also found in a song from the islands of Susak, Žirje, and city of Dubrovnik. Bošković-Stulli deduced that such songs were widespread on Croatian territory, emerged from an older stratum of folk poetry, and with some hinterland influences partly changed and formed in Dalmatia.

The main themes are about Christian-Ottoman conflicts (including battles of Kosovo in 1389 and 1448, sometimes mixed together), events regarding Croatian-Hungarian, Bosnian and Serbian history and feudal lords from 14th-16th centuries, and Montenegrin coastal battles in Perast and Bay of Kotor in the 17th century. It has typical South Slavic epic poetry heroes, from Serbian figures Marko Kraljević, Đurađ Branković, Vuk Grgurević, Jakšić brothers and possibly Miloš Obilić, Hungarian figures Sibinjanin Janko (Janos Hunyadi), Sekula or Ivan Zeker (Székely), Svilojević (Michael Szilágyi), Matthias Corvinus and John Corvinus, Croatian figures Ivan Karlović, Nikola Šubić Zrinski, Petar Berislavić, to local Dubrovnik and Bokelji heroes. However, the poems are often focused on the secondary participants of these events, emphasizing human experience and interaction. They conserved archaic feudal period customs, manners, etiquette, descriptions of attire, weapon, mythological dragon or snake and vila and so on. They integrate different cultural and ethnic layers and represent significant monument of South Slavic folklore.

== See also ==
- Serbian epic poetry
- Perast manuscript
