= Golenishchev-Kutuzov =

Golenishchev-Kutuzov (Russian: Голенищев-Кутузов) may refer to

- House of Golenishchev-Kutuzov, old Russian noble family
  - Arseny Golenishchev-Kutuzov (1848–1913), Russian poet
  - Mikhail Illarionovich Golenishchev-Kutuzov (1745–1813), Russian field marshal and prince
- Ilya Golenishchev-Kutuzov (1904–1969), Russian philologist, poet and translator

== See also ==
- Kutuzov (surname)
- Kutuzov (disambiguation)
