= Kutuzov (disambiguation) =

Mikhail Kutuzov was a Field Marshal of the Russian Empire.

Kutuzov may also refer to:

- Kutuzov (surname)
- Kutuzovsky Avenue in Moscow, Russia
- Kutuzov Embankment in Saint Petersburg, Russia
- Kutuzov Island (Daxitong Dao), on the Ussuri River, Russia
- Operation Kutuzov, military operation (battle) in World War II
- Order of Kutuzov, military award
- Soviet cruiser Mikhail Kutuzov, a Soviet (and later Russian) cruiser of the Black Sea Fleet from 1954 to 2000
- 2492 Kutuzov, (also known as 2492 (1977 NT) Kutuzov and 1977 NT), a main belt asteroid
- Kutuzov (film), a 1943 Soviet drama film
