= Elizabeth Szilágyi =

15th century Hungarian queen, noblewoman

Erzsébet Szilágyi
- Queen Mother of Hungary
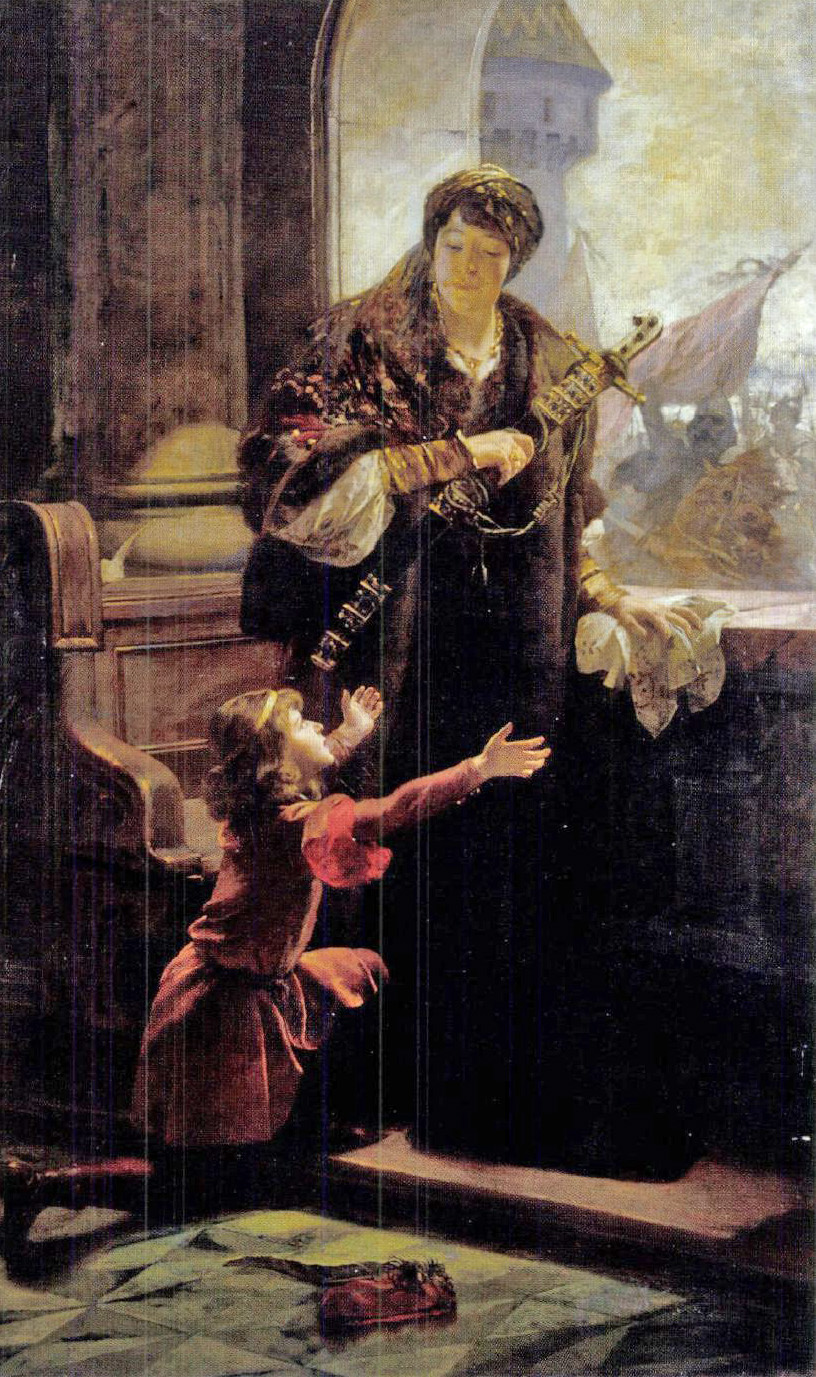
- Erzsébet Szilágyi and her son Matthias Corvinus, by Zsigmond Vajda

Queen Mother of Hungary
- Tenure: 20 January 1458 - 1483

Head of Szilágyi – Hunyadi Liga with her brother Michael Szilágyi
- Tenure: 1457 - 20 January 1458
- Born: 1410
- Died: 1483 (aged 72–73)
- Spouse: John Hunyadi
- Issue: Ladislaus Hunyadi; Matthias Corvinus
- House: House of Szilágyi (by birth); House of Hunyadi (by marriage)
- Father: count Ladislaus Szilágyi
- Mother: Catherine Bellyéni
- Religion: Roman Catholic

Erzsébet Szilágyi (Hungarian: Szilágyi Erzsébet, c. 1410 – 1483) was a Hungarian noblewoman, wife of John Hunyadi and mother of Matthias Corvinus, King of Hungary.

Elizabeth was the daughter of Ladislaus Szilágyi and Catherine Bellyéni, members of two influential Hungarian families of the 15th century that were loyal to the King Sigismund of Hungary. She had several siblings, including Mihály Szilágyi, who had an important role after the death of Elizabeth's husband, John Hunyadi.

Hunyadi was the regent of the Kingdom of Hungary and supreme commander of the armies, an excellent fighter, that counted with the favor of the Pope for confronting the Ottoman Empire. He was the most powerful nobleman of the Kingdom had huge estates and hundreds of lower noblemen that supported him. After his death in 1456, his older son Ladislaus Hunyadi became the head of the House of Hunyadi, however after murdering Count Ulrich von Cilli, the counselor of the King Ladislaus V of Hungary, he was executed.

Elizabeth's only son Matthias Corvinus of Hungary was taken to Prague by the young King, who feared for his life before the instability caused by the execution of Ladislaus Hunyadi. Mihály Szilágyi and Elizabeth founded Szilágyi – Hunyadi Liga and became the leaders of this Liga, and after the sudden death of King Ladislaus (possibly poisoned), she negotiated the release of Matthias, who was soon elected as King of Hungary in 1458.

After this, Elizabeth became the mother of the King, and continued being a great influence in the Kingdom. Matthias had an illegitimate son in 1473, and soon was sent to the estates of his grandmother, who raised him with the best teachers of the Kingdom. The illegitimate John Corvinus never became King of Hungary after the death of Matthias because of the pressure of the noblemen and the widow of the monarch, but enjoyed titles and properties, fighting the Turkish armies until the end of his life as his grandfather and father did before. His grandmother Elizabeth lived in Óbuda most of his life, and founded several monasteries and chapels, following her deeply religious beliefs. She died around 1483.

== Ancestry ==
Ancestors of Elizabeth Szilágyi

8. Roland Szilágyi
4. Nicholas Szilágyi
2. Ladislaus Szilágyi
1. Erzsébet Szilágyi, Queen Mother of Hungary
6. István Bellén
3. Katalin Bellyéni

Elizabeth Szilágyi House of Szilágyi (by birth); House of Hunyadi (by marriage) Born: 1410 Died: 1483
Regnal titles
Preceded by Elizabeth of Luxembourg	Queen Mother of Hungary; 20 January 1458 - 1483	Vacant
Preceded by Consort of Ladislaus Jakcs	Consort of the Voivode of Transylvania; 1441–1446	Succeeded by Margit Rozgonyi
Preceded by Consort of Franko Talovac	Consort of the Ban of Severin; 1439–1446	Succeeded by vacant
Preceded by Consorts of Emeric Bebek & Stephen Bánfi	Consort Countess of the Székelys; 1441–1446	Succeeded by Consort of Francis Csáki
Political offices
New title	Head of Szilágyi–Hunyadi Liga with her brother Count Michael Szilágyi; 1457 - 20 January 1458	Vacant
