= Smecchia =

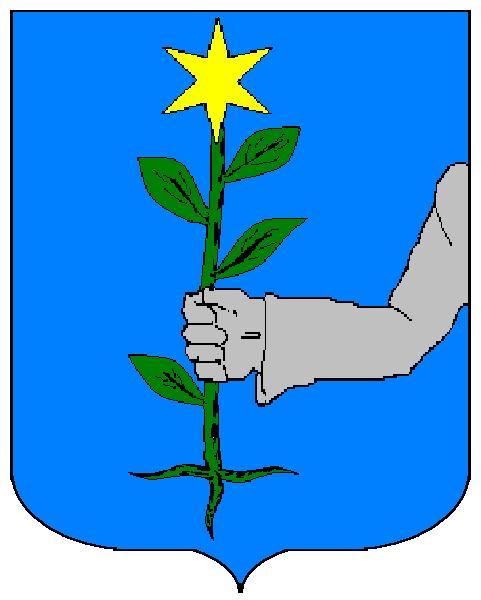
- Coat of arms of the Smecchia family

Other names
- Variant forms: Smekja, Smeća

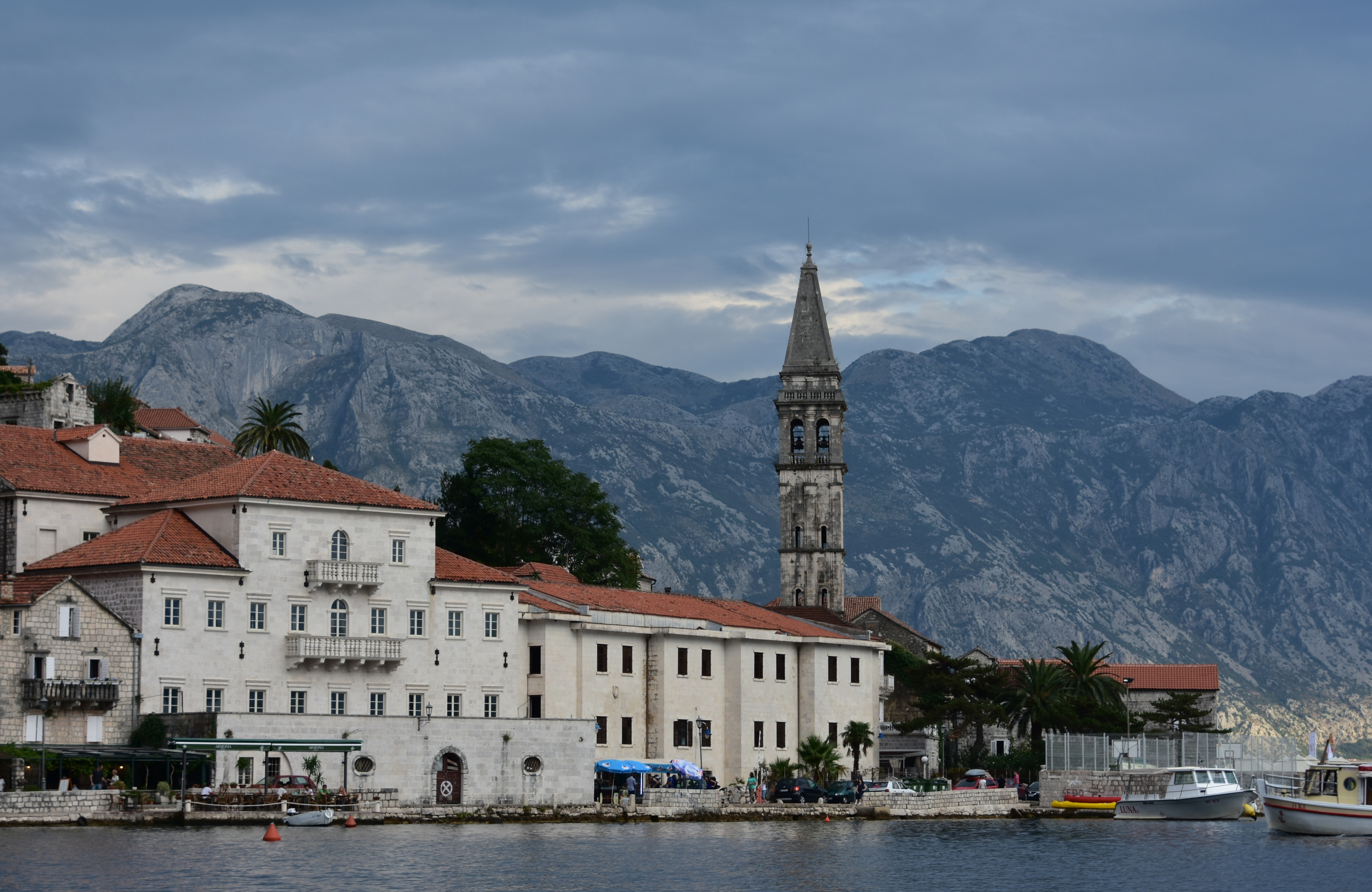
Smecchia palace in Perast, Bay of Kotor, Montenegro

The House of Smecchia is an old aristocratic family from Perast that rose to power during the Republic of Venice. The vernacular is Smeća or Smekja.

== History ==
The earliest mention of the Smecchia family living in Boka Kotorska was found in a written document from 1326. The area flourished during the 14th century under the rule of Dušan the Mighty, Emperor of the Serbs who, notorious for his aggressive law enforcement, made the Bay of Kotor a particularly safe and prosperous place for doing business.

Centuries later, when the Kotor Bay became part of the Republic of Venice, Vincenzo Vicko Smekja (1694-1762) brought about the economic prosperity of the family, following his famous merchant undertaking when he established a trading route between Venice, Genoa and Mediterranean Sea in his ship “Leon Koronato” in 1746.

In 1748, Vicko and his brother Kristofor Krsto were awarded with the title of “Konte” (Count) by Pietro Grimani, who was at that time Doge of Venice. The title was hereditary by all their legitimate male line descendants. This means that legitimate male members of the family were entitled to the rank of count, while legitimate female born members were also entitled to the rank of countess, but without the right to transmit their title to their offspring when they get married. Vicko's son, Konte Petar (1724-1767) established a trading route between Venice the Baltic countries. Apart from already belonging to the Venetian nobility, the family also acquired the status of Kotor nobility in 1779.

A branch of the Smecchia family was notable in Perast, Boka Kotorska, Venetian Republic (today Montenegro). The Smekja palace is the biggest of all palaces in Perast. The three-story edifice with belvedere was entirely built of stone brought from the island of Korčula. A terraced porch stretches along the whole length of the first floor, while the second and third floors are decorated with balustraded balconies. Above the entrance is the coat-of-arms of the casada Cizmaj – two crossed branches with five feathers on each one.

The important Perast manuscript was discovered in the palace in Perast. The palace was sold in 1923 by Count Franz-Emil de Smecchia (1861-1924) and his brother Count Attilio de Smecchia (1864-1943), who were at that time living in Zagreb. Attilio's granddaughter, Countess Anna Maria "Lilia" de Smecchia (b. 1947) is the mother of Princess Elisabetta of Belgium.

== Notable members ==
- Tripo Smeća
