= Perast manuscript =

17th century Serbian literature

- Perast, Venetian Empire (modern-day Montenegro)
- Date: end of 17th century
- Place of origin: Perast, Venetian Republic (modern-day Montenegro)
- Scribe: Nikola Mazarović
- Author(s): Unknown, speculations about some of songs being authored by Andrija Zmajević or probably Nikola Burović
- Condition: without coverpage
- Contents: 8 bugarštica songs; 1 drama
- Previously kept: in the house of noble family Smecchia or family Balović in Perast
- Discovered: by Srećko Vulović

The Perast manuscript (Serbian: Перашки рукопис) is a manuscript written around 1700 which contains the earliest records of the heroic songs in decasyllable verse (Serbian: deseterac).

The origin of the songs recorded in Perast manuscript is not the end of the 17th century because they must have had long development before they were recorded. The Perast manuscript contains eight bugarštica songs and one drama. The topic of four bugarštica and drama is the Battle of Kosovo, while others tell other historical events, like of Bajo Pivljanin.

The oral folk poetry was very popular in Kotor bay and during the 18th century, people began recording them. Some of their manuscripts survived until modern days, many of unknown authorship. Therefore, besides the Perast manuscript known as Balovićs manuscript, many other 18th century manuscripts written in Perast survived until modern-days, most notable of them being manuscript written in 1775. This manuscript is known as Mazarović's manuscript. It does not contain bugarštica but ten-syllable verse songs which are other versions of bugarštica songs from the earlier manuscript.

== Authorship ==
The scholars disagree about the origin and chronology of songs found in the Perast manuscript.

Its original has not been preserved. The manuscript was found by Srećko Vulović in the house of a noble Perast family Smecchia. Since the manuscript did not have the cover page with the name of author or authors of its text, they remained unknown.

According to Maja Bošković-Stulli, the manuscript which contains bugarštica songs was found in the house of Balović, while the manuscript with ten-syllable verse songs was found in the house of Mazarović family.

Vulović speculated that the author of the play about the Battle of Kosovo was Serbian primate and archbishop Andrija Zmajević or probably Nikola Burović who authored larger part of the manuscript and this hypothesis was accepted by many other authors. Some authors insist that manuscript belongs to unknown collector rejecting the possibility that it was Zmajević. According to analysis of the handwriting performed by Gracija Brajković, the author of manuscript was Nikola Burović.

The manuscript written by Mazarović has the year of its creation, 1775, written on it. According to Svetozar Koljević, the person who wrote the manuscript with bugarštica. Koljević also emphasizes that none of the songs from the 1775 manuscript with ten-syllable verse songs are bugarštica. The 1775 manuscript was written in Latin script with most of its songs being versions of bugarštica found in earlier Perast manuscript Still, Valtazar Bogišić believed that Mazarović did not record ten-syllable verse songs on the basis of bugarštica songs from an earlier manuscript, but in some other, possibly even older, manuscript. Mazarović certainly has not authored or recorded from oral poetry any of the songs he recorded in 1775 manuscript. He only transcribed them from already existing records.

== Content ==
In this manuscript from Boka Kotorska eight songs are presented in two versions: like bugarštica and in ten-syllable verse. One bugarštica is very similar to drama. Four bugaršticas are about Battle of Kosovo. One bugarštica which is similar to drama and another which more resembles the song, describe Miloš Obilić both referring to his last name as Koviljić. The similar mistake about the year of the Battle of Kosovo led to conclusion that they are linked to each other. In drama and one bugarštica song, Miloš Obilić was described as stepping onto sultan's neck.

One bugarštica describes ill fate of Nikola of Perast who was accused by some girl from Paštrovići for raping her, so twelve armed men from Paštrovići killed him before all of them were killed to. Another bugarštica describes the pirate attack on Perast galley near Durazzo. One bugarštica describes clash between the citizens of Perast with the Ottomans from Risan trying to capture women from Perast.

The Perast manuscript contains three songs about Bajo Pivljanin which are actually old motives applied on Bajo and Perast.

Nobody have ever published all of the songs from Balović version of the Perast manuscript. Only 9 bugarštica were published.

=== Play about the Battle of Kosovo ===
This play does not have short title, but rather long one: “Here begins the battle of Prince Lazar and the evil purpose of Miloš Kobilić and of the traitor Vuk Branković and the nine Jugović brothers at Kosovo field on June 24, 1343.”. The author of this play deprived the Kosovo legend of its overtones connected to Serbian Orthodoxy and gave it more general Christian ones instead of the particular national tale.

== Other Perast manuscripts ==
Besides Perast manuscripts of Mazarović, there were many other similar manuscripts, smaller and usually of lower importance. Three of such manuscripts came from family of Balović. One of them, sometimes referred to as Balovićs manuscript, contains 24 folk poems including 9 bugarštica, all of them thematically connected with Kotor Bay.

In Dubrovnik, a copy of the Perast Navigation Instructions manuscript is held in the archives.

== Sources ==
- Бојовић, Злата (2008). Књижевност и стварност: Научни састанак слависта у Вукове дане, 12-15, IX 2007, МСЦ, Београд. Међународни славистички центар.
- CZMSS (2006). Mitološki zbornik. Centar za mitološki studije Srbije.
- MSC (1991). Kosovski boj u književnom i kulturnom nasleđu. Međunarodni slavistički centar.
- Ređep, Jelka (1991). "The Legend of Kosovo". Oral Tradition. 6 (2–3). Columbia, Missouri: Center for Studies in Oral Tradition. ISSN 1542-4308.
