= Kutuzov (surname) =

Kutuzov (Russian: Кутузов) is a Russian masculine surname, its feminine counterpart is Kutuzova. It may refer to:

- Alexander Kutuzov (born 1985), Russian hockey player
- Alexey Kutuzov (1748—1791), Russian mystic and alchemist
- Arseny Golenishchev-Kutuzov (1848–1913), Russian poet
- Danil Kutuzov (born 1987), Russian futsal player
- Ilya Golenishchev-Kutuzov (1904–1969), Russian philologist, poet and translator
- Mikhail Kutuzov (Golenishchev-Kutuzov; 1745–1813), Russian field marshal during Napoleonic era
- Natalia Kutuzova (born 1975), Russian water polo player
- Olimpia Kutuzova (1845–1910s), Russian Narodnik revolutionary
- Roman Kutuzov, several people
- Viktoriya Kutuzova (born 1988), Ukrainian tennis player
- Vitali Kutuzov (born 1980), Belarusian soccer player
