= Tripo Smecchia =

Venetian historian and writer (1755–1812)

- Born: 1755; Perast, Republic of Venice (now Montenegro)
- Died: 25 September 1812 (aged 56–57)
- Citizenship: Venetian
- Writing career
- Notable works: "Skanderbeg"; "History of our province"; "Scientific dictionary"

Tripo Smecchia or Tripo Smeća (1755 – 25 September 1812) was a Venetian historian and writer from Perast, Bay of Kotor (today in Montenegro). He collected old manuscripts and transcribed popular poetry.

== Family and education ==
Tripo was born in 1755 as a member of the noble Smecchia family (Smeća, Smekija or Smekja) from Perast, Bay of Kotor (Boka Kotorska). Today, the descendants of the Smeccia family live in Trieste, now in Italy. In 1764 the Smeccia family built the biggest palace with the most beautiful facade in Perast, called Smecchia Palace. After he graduated from the Law school at the University of Padua he returned to Perast. Smecchia died on 25 September 1812.

== Bibliography ==
Smecchia's notable works include Italian language tragedy "Skanderbeg", missing "History of our province" and "Scientific dictionary". He was also mentioned as one of cartographers of Boka Kotorska. In 1785 his map of Boka Kotorska and Albania was printed in Venice. According to don Srećko Vulović, in his memoirs Smecchia wrote in 1805 that chieftains of Montenegro refused to kill all Catholics from Boka Kotorska as proposed by some Orthodox leaders in the assembly. Like many other notable writers from Perast, Smecchia used the library of Andrija Zmajević and under his influence recorded popular poetry. In 1810 Smecchia transcribed a work of Timotej Cizila, the first writer of novels in Montenegro. He wrote a description of the battle between Ivan Bronza, the captain of ship "Costanza Guerriera", and Ottoman fleet of 50 ships at Sipont in 1672.

== See also ==
- Smecchia
