= Mihajlo Svilojević =

Mihajlo Svilojević (Serbian: Михајло Свилојевић), sometimes crni ban Mihail, is a hero of Serbian epic poetry based on the historical figure of Michael Szilágyi.

== Background ==
In 1459, the Ottomans conquered the Serbian Despotate and appeared on the border of the Kingdom of Hungary in the region near the Sava and Danube Rivers. Many notable Hungarian noblemen who distinguished themselves in the struggle against the Ottomans during the 15th century became heroes of Serbian epic poetry. One of them was Michael Szilágyi, who became the epic character Mihajlo Svilojević. Other popular heroes of Serbian epic poetry based on Hungarian noblemen include Vuča General, Filip Mađarinin, and Sibinjanin Janko.

== Poetry ==
Svilojević is mentioned in the epic poem "Osman", Ivan Gundulić's masterpiece written at the beginning of the 17th century. He is the main subject of many Serbian epic poems, including the bugarštica "Popevka od Svilojevića" (English: The Song of Svilojević) found in the 17th century among the papers of Petar Zrinski after his death. This poem was motivated by a historical event, the 1460 capture and imprisonment of Michael Szilágyi. It was published in 1851 by Franz Miklosich, who assumed that Zrinski personally wrote down the song. Some scholars believed that Zrinski did it in 1661 during his imprisonment before his execution. Later research refuted this assumption and estimated that the poem was recorded in 1663. This poem would later serve as a basis of the poem about Jurišić Janko composed by Vuk Karadžić at the beginning of the 19th century. Based on the manuscript written by Đorđe Sremac, Serbian historian Mihailo Dinić concluded that "Popevka od Svilojevića" was based on a song from the first half of the 15th century, which centered on Szilágyi's capture and his conflict with the Ottoman Sultan. Although earlier songs present Kosovo as the location of Svilojević's capture, probably based on his first capture during the Second Battle of Kosovo; however, the historical event actually happened in Banat. "Popevka" is the only song with Svilojević as the main hero. In all other songs his role is marginal and his purpose is to complete "three good heroes" which was a frequent motif of the Serbian epic poetry. In other poems recorded during the 17th and 18th centuries on the Dalmatian coast, Svilojević was not the main hero but one of "three good heroes" connected to the Battle of Kosovo, the Second Battle of Kosovo, or some other important event. In more recent poetry, the glory of Svilojević faded and he became a marginal character, a guest at the weddings of other heroes.
