= Regent of Hungary =

Position in the Kingdom of Hungary (1446/1920–1944)

- Magyarország kormányzója
- Standard of the Regent

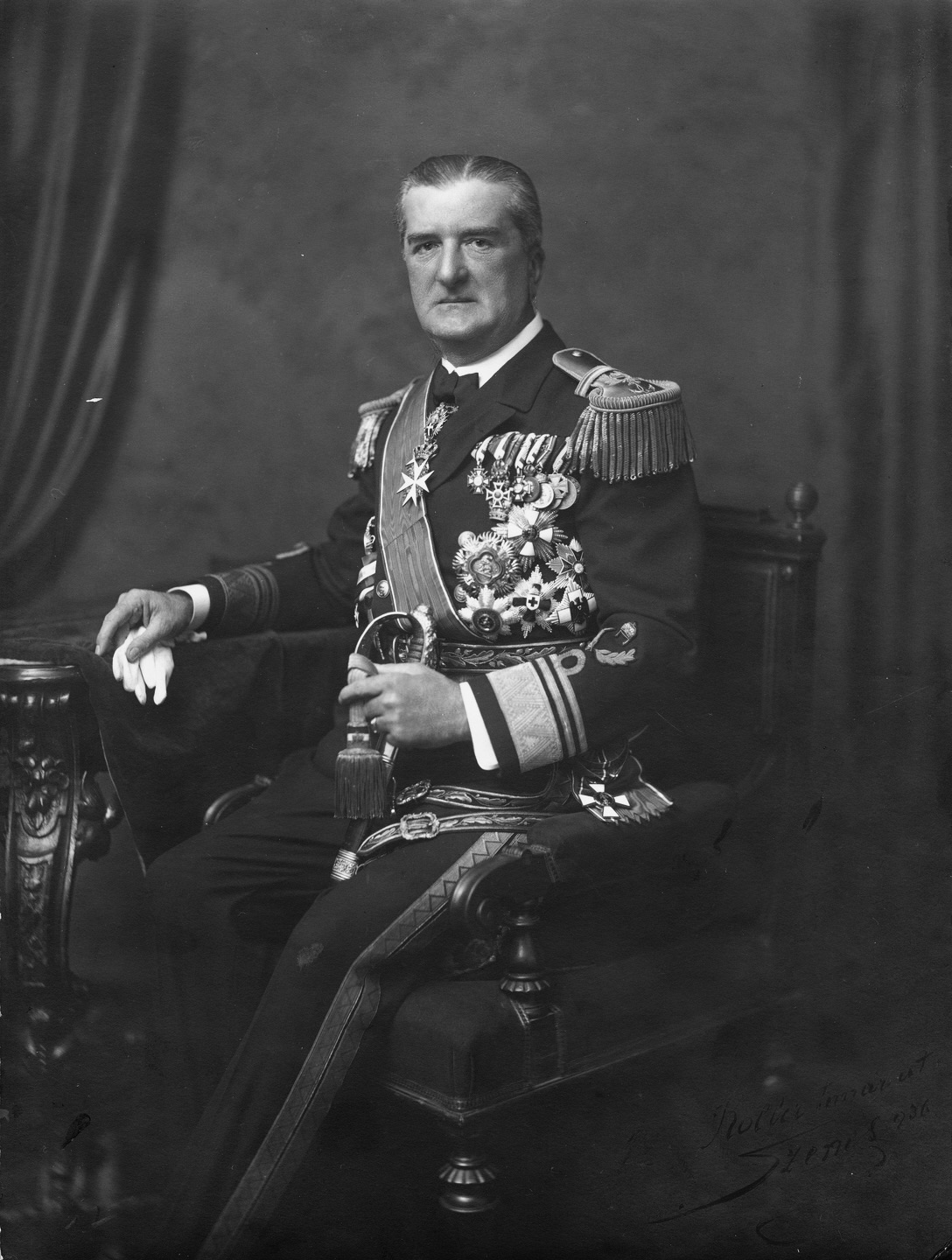
- Longest serving Miklós Horthy; 1 March 1920 – 16 October 1944
- Style: His Serene Highness
- Type: Head of state Commander-in-chief
- Member of: Crown Council
- Residence: Buda Castle
- Appointer: Royal Diet National Assembly
- Term length: No fixed term
- Formation: 6 June 1446 (historic); 1 March 1920
- First holder: John Hunyadi
- Final holder: Miklós Horthy
- Abolished: 15 October 1944
- Deputy: Vice-Regent

The regent of Hungary (Hungarian: Magyarország kormányzója) was a position established in 1446 and renewed in 1920. It was held by Admiral Miklós Horthy until 1944. Under the Constitution of Hungary there were two regents, one a regent of the ruling house, called the Nádor, and another called "Kormányzó" (which can mean "governor"). As the Allied Powers had banned the legitimate Nádor (kept by a member of the House of Habsburg) from taking his place, the choice fell on electing a governor-regent: Admiral Horthy was chosen. Thus, he was regent of the post-World War I state called the Kingdom of Hungary and served as the head of state in the absence of a monarch, while a prime minister served as head of government. Horthy was styled "His Serene Highness the Regent of the Kingdom of Hungary" (Ő Főméltósága a Magyar Királyság Kormányzója).

== History of the position ==
=== Historical examples ===
==== John Hunyadi ====
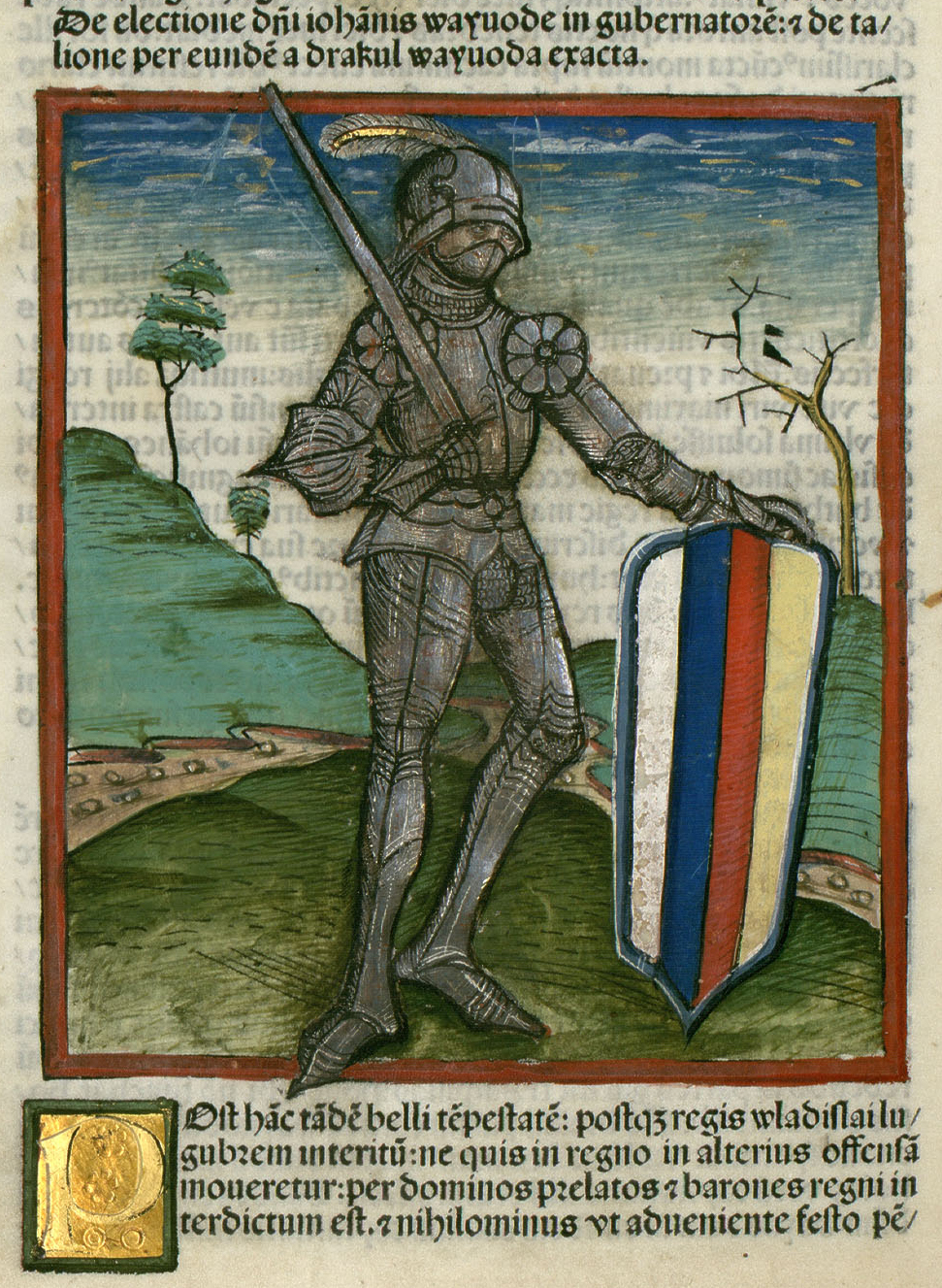
John Hunyadi, Regent in 1446–1453 (Chronica Hungarorum, 1488)

On the untimely death of Albert in 1439, John Hunyadi was of the opinion that Hungary was best served by a warrior king and lent his support to the candidature of young King of Poland Władysław III of Varna in 1440, and thus came into collision with the powerful magnate Ulrich II of Celje, the chief proponent of Albert's widow Elisabeth of Bohemia (1409–1442) and her infant son, Ladislaus Posthumus of Bohemia and Hungary. Featuring prominently in the brief ensuing civil war, Władysław III's side was thus reinforced by Hunyadi's noticeable military abilities, and was rewarded by Władysław with the captaincy of the fortress of Belgrade, a latter dignity that he shared with Miklós Újlaki.

At the diet which met in February 1445 a provisional government consisting of five Captains General was formed, with Hunyadi receiving Transylvania and four counties bordering on the Tisza, called the Partium or Körösvidék, to rule. As the anarchy resulting from the division became unmanageable, Hunyadi was elected regent of Hungary (Regni Gubernator) on 5 June 1446 in the name of Ladislaus V and given the powers of a regent. His first act as regent was to proceed against the German king Frederick III, who refused to release Ladislaus V. After ravaging Styria, Carinthia, and Carniola and threatening Vienna, Hunyadi's difficulties elsewhere compelled him to make a truce with Frederick for two years.

==== Mihály Szilágyi ====
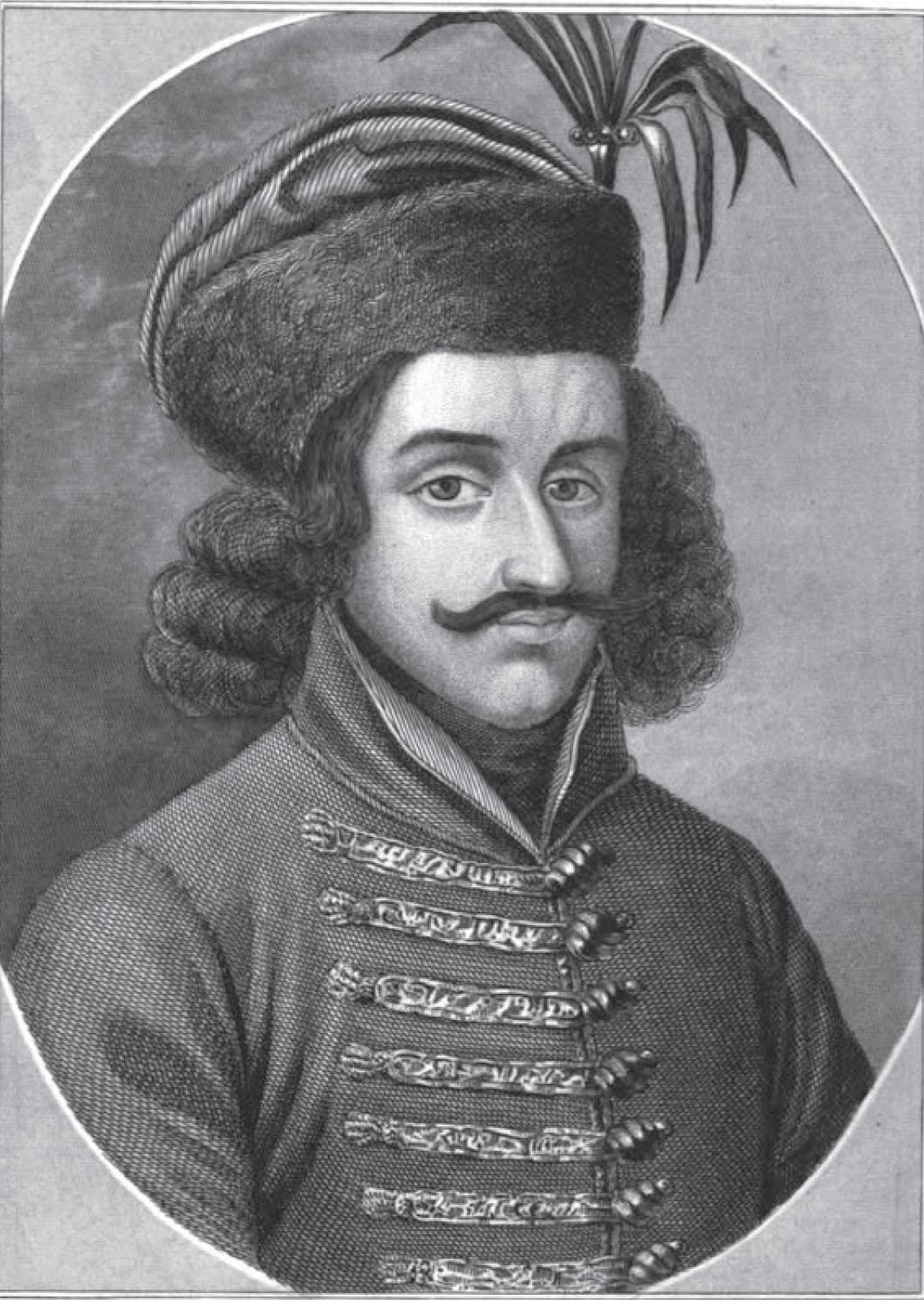
Mihály Szilágyi, Regent in 1458

On 20 January 1458, Matthias (son of John Hunyadi) was elected king by the Parliament. This was the first time in the medieval Hungarian kingdom that a member of the nobility, without dynastic ancestry and relationship, mounted the royal throne. Such an election upset the usual course of dynastic succession in the age. In the Czech and Hungarian states they heralded a new judiciary era in Europe, characterized by the absolute supremacy of the Parliament, (dietal system) and a tendency to centralization. During his reign, Matthias reduced the power of the feudal lords, and ruled instead with a cadre of talented and highly educated individuals, chosen for their abilities rather than their social status. The Diet appointed Mihály Szilágyi, the new king's uncle as regent, because of Matthias' young age. Throughout 1458 the struggle between the young king and the magnates, reinforced by Matthias's own uncle and guardian Szilágyi, was acute. But Matthias, who began by deposing Garai and dismissing Szilágyi, and then proceeded to levy a tax, without the consent of the Diet, in order to hire mercenaries, easily prevailed.

==== Lajos Kossuth ====
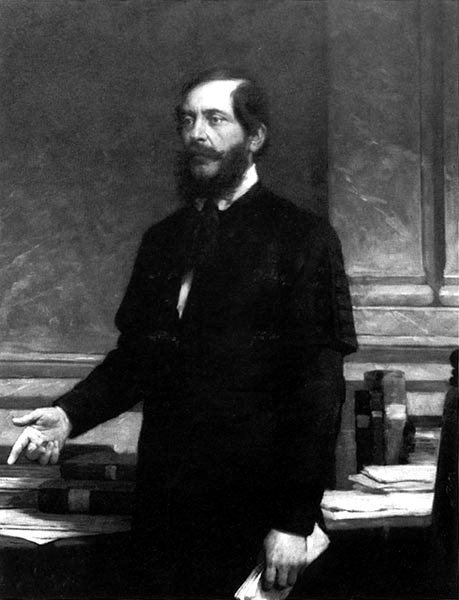
Lajos Kossuth, Governor-President in 1849

During the Hungarian Revolution of 1848 the new Emperor Francis Joseph revoked all the concessions granted in March and outlawed Kossuth and the Hungarian government - set up lawfully on the basis of the April Laws. In April 1849, when the Hungarians had won many successes, after sounding the army, Lajos Kossuth issued the celebrated Hungarian Declaration of Independence, in which he declared that "the house of Habsburg-Lorraine, perjured in the sight of God and man, had forfeited the Hungarian throne." Establishing the Hungarian State, the declaration was a step characteristic of his love for extreme and dramatic action, but it added to the dissensions between him and those who wished only for autonomy under the old dynasty, and his enemies did not scruple to accuse him of aiming for Kingship. The dethronement also made any compromise with the Habsburgs practically impossible. Lajos Kossuth became head of state as Governor-President of Hungary.

=== After World War I ===
Upon the dissolution and break-up of Austria-Hungary after World War I, the Hungarian Democratic Republic and then the Hungarian Soviet Republic were briefly proclaimed in 1918 and 1919, respectively. The short-lived communist government of Béla Kun launched what was known as the "Red Terror", involving Hungary in an ill-fated war with Romania. In 1920, the country fell into a period of civil conflict, with Hungarian anti-communists and monarchists violently purging the nation of communists, leftist intellectuals, and others whom they felt threatened by, especially Jews. This period was known as the "White Terror". In 1920, after the pullout of the last of the Romanian occupation forces, the Kingdom of Hungary was restored.

On 1 March 1920, the National Assembly of Hungary re-established the Kingdom of Hungary, but chose not to recall the deposed Habsburg ruler of the Austro-Hungarian Empire, Emperor Charles I of Austria, who had reigned in Hungary as King Charles (Karoly) IV of Hungary. The Entente powers had made clear that they would not accept a Habsburg as Hungary's head of state. Archduke Joseph August, Charles' cousin, had taken over as regent for a few weeks in 1919, but stood down when the Entente refused to recognize him. Instead, with National Army officers controlling the parliament building, the assembly voted to install the last Commander-in-Chief of the Imperial Fleet (Austro-Hungarian Navy) and current Minister of War and Commander of the National Army, Admiral Horthy, as head of state; he defeated Count Albert Apponyi by a vote of 131 to 7 and became the new Regent of Hungary.

Bishop Ottokár Prohászka then led a small delegation to meet Horthy, announcing, “Hungary’s Parliament has elected you Regent! Would it please you to accept the office of Regent of Hungary?” To their astonishment, Horthy declined unless his powers were expanded. As Horthy stalled, the politicians folded, and granted him "the general prerogatives of the King, with the exception of the right to name titles of nobility and of the patronage of the Church." Those prerogatives included the power to appoint and dismiss prime ministers, to convene and dissolve parliament, and to command the armed forces. With those sweeping powers guaranteed, Horthy took the oath of office. (King Charles did try to regain his throne twice; see Charles IV of Hungary's attempts to retake the throne for more details.)

== Functions ==
The Hungarian state was legally a kingdom, but it had no king, as the Allies of World War I would not have tolerated any return of the Habsburgs. The country retained its parliamentary system following the dissolution of Austria-Hungary, with a prime minister appointed as head of government. As head of state, Horthy retained significant influence through his constitutional powers and the loyalty of his ministers to the crown. Although his involvement in drafting legislation was minuscule, he nevertheless had the ability to ensure that laws passed by the Hungarian parliament conformed to his political preferences.

== End of the regency ==
During World War II Hungary was aligned with Nazi Germany. As the war turned against the Germans the Hungarian government began to dissociate itself from the war effort and the Germans became concerned they might desert the Axis powers. In March 1944, Germans occupied Hungary during Operation Margarethe to keep them in the war. Horthy was allowed to remain in his position, but he was forced to remove his prime minister and appoint one that would appease the Germans.

After Romania withdrew from the Axis and accepted an armistice with the Soviet Union in August 1944, Horthy decided to secretly negotiate with the Soviets. On 15 October 1944, Horthy announced in a national radio broadcast that Hungary had signed an armistice with the Soviets. The Germans responded with Operation Panzerfaust. This included arresting both Horthy and his son Miklós. Horthy was forced to sign a statement that renounced the armistice and turned over control of the government to Ferenc Szálasi as Magyar királyi miniszterelnök (Royal Hungarian Prime Minister). Szálasi was the leader of the pro-Nazi Arrow Cross Party. Horthy later explained his capitulation: "I neither resigned nor appointed Szálasi Premier, I merely exchanged my signature for my son’s life. A signature wrung from a man at machine-gun point can have little legality."

Szálasi led the Government of National Unity from 15 October 1944 to 28 March 1945. The Hungarian parliament approved the formation of a Council of Regency (Kormányzótanács). On 4 November 1944, Szálasi was sworn in as the "National Leader" (Nemzetvezető), so he became the head of state in addition to being the head of government as Prime Minister of Hungary. While the Horthy regency had come to an end the Hungarian monarchy was not abolished by the Szálasi regime. The need for a regent, or a regency, ended when the Kingdom of Hungary was replaced by the Second Hungarian Republic on 1 February 1946.

== List of officeholders ==
=== Medieval kingdom ===
No.	Portrait	Regent	Title	Took office	Left office	Time in office	Monarch
1	John Hunyadi	prince John Hunyadi (1407–1456)	Regent-Governor	6 June 1446	30 January 1453	6 years, 238 days	Ladislaus V
2	Michael Szilágyi	count Michael Szilágyi (1400–1460)	Regent	20 January 1458	August 1459	1 year, 212 days	Matthias I

=== War of Independence of 1848–1849 ===
No.	Portrait	Regent	Title	Took office	Left office	Time in office	Monarch
3	Lajos Kossuth	Lajos Kossuth (1802–1894)	Head of state (Governor-President)	14 April 1849	11 August 1849	119 days	Vacant
–	Artúr Görgei	General; Artúr Görgei (1818–1916); Acting	interim head of state (Military Dictator)	11 August 1849	13 August 1849	2 days	Vacant

=== The Regency ===
No.	Portrait	Regent	Title	Took office	Left office	Time in office	Monarch
4	Archduke Joseph August	Generalfeldmarschall; Archduke Joseph August (1872–1962)	Head of state (Governor)	6 August 1919	23 August 1919	16 days	Vacant
5	Miklós Horthy	Flottenkommandant vitéz Miklós Horthy (1868–1957)	Head of state (Regent)	1 March 1920	16 October 1944	24 years, 229 days	Vacant

==== Deputies ====
No.	Portrait	Deputy	Took office	Left office	Time in office	Regent
1	István Horthy	Vitéz; István Horthy (1904–1942)	19 February 1942	20 August 1942 †	182 days	Miklós Horthy

== See also ==
- King of Hungary
- List of rulers of Hungary
- List of heads of state of Hungary
