= Bulgari (instrument) =

The bulgari or boulgari (Greek: μπουλγαρί) is a string instrument that originates from Turkey, especially from Anatolia among the Oghuz Turks living in the Taurus Mountains, similar to the bağlama and the çağür, especially to Egypt and Crete. belonging to the 'tampoura' family and closely related to the 'tzoura', it is played with strings plucked with a pick. This long-necked lute first appeared towards the end of the 18th century and became well-known after 1915 through the Greeks of Asia Minor. It was mainly played in Rethimno during the mid-war and owes its popularity to Stelio Foustalieri. It is rarely come across in Crete today.

== Origin ==
The bulgari originates from Turkey as an evolution of the saz, a six to eight sting chordophone that most likely descended from other central Asian instruments. It would take its name from the Volga Bulgars with which the Turks had been in contact with. It, however, has no direct link with the Danube Bulgaria, another similar lute also called a tambura, due to the isolation of the Bulgars. The Bulgari belongs to the family of tambûrs, an instrument class that started in early Mesopotamia, which started to spread in the Ottoman Empire approximately around 14th-century. The French musicologist William André Villoteau mentioned in his journal an instrument with two strings existing in Cairo called the tanbour boulghari or bulgarie The bulgari proceeded to implant itself into Greek culture through Crete when refugees came from Anatolia in 1920, although a type of bulgari seems to have existed in the 19th-century among Christian and Muslim populations.

== Construction ==
The sound box of the bulgari is either carved from a mulberry wood block or molded laminated wood with a soundboard made of pine or spruce. There is an ear with a rosette located either at the base or on the upper side.

The long handle is equipped with anywhere from sixteen to twenty-two movable frets, although some musicians such as Stelios Foustalierakis replaced them with fixed frets. There are usually six to eight cords but variants have been seen with as low as three cords.

== Examples of the Bulgari ==
Below are audio and visual examples of the bulgari in use:

- Labis Xylouris plays Bulgari (YouTube user rotonda100 has a few great examples of the bulgari in action)
- "Cecen Kizi," by Ross Daly
- "Tsiftetelli Kurdi," by Periklis Papapetropoulos, a famous bulgari musician
