= Kutuzov Island =

Island in Russia

Coordinates: 47°04′32″N 134°08′54″E

Kutuzov Island (Russian: остров Кутузов) is the largest island along the Ussuri River.

Under former Chinese possession it was known as Daxitong dao. Control was transferred to the Soviet Union by the government of Manchukuo. Under the terms of the agreement, the island remained in Russia's possession with the fall of the Soviet Union. The Republic of China (Taiwan) does not recognize this and other transfers to the USSR or Russia since 1931.
