= Michael Szilágyi =

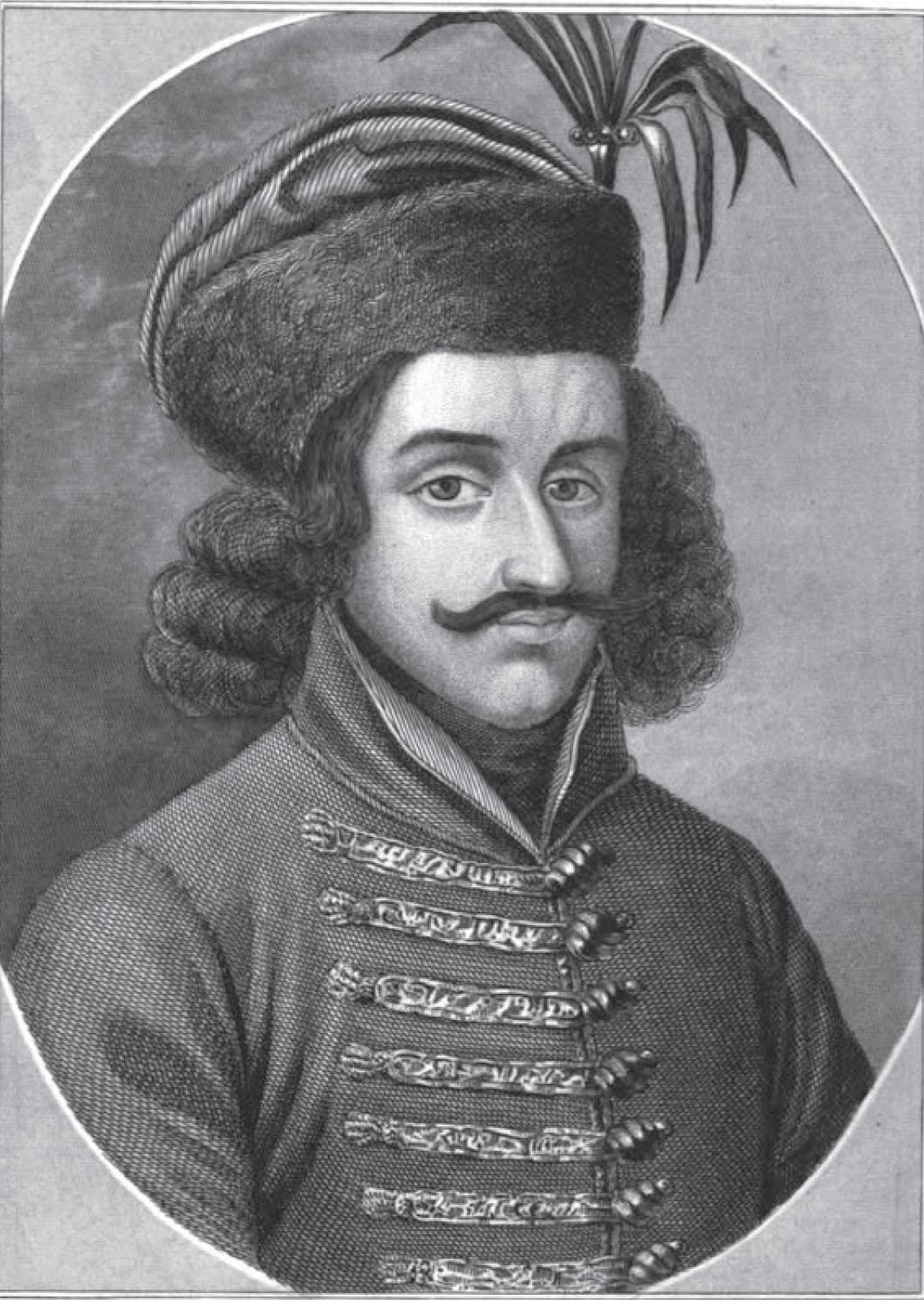

Regent of the Kingdom of Hungary
- Reign: 20 January 1458 – August 1459

Ban of Macsó
- Reign: 1457–1458
- Predecessor: Nicholas of Ilok and Paul Herceg de Szekcső
- Successor: Nicholas Dombai and Peter Szokoli
- Born: c. 1400
- Died: 1460; Constantinople, Ottoman Empire (today Istanbul, Turkey)
- Spouse: Margit Báthory
- House: House of Szilágyi
- Father: Ladislaus Szilágyi
- Mother: Katalin Bellyéni
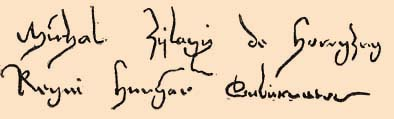
- Signature

Michael Szilágyi de Horogszeg (Hungarian: horogszegi Szilágyi Mihály; c. 1400 – 1460) was a Hungarian general who was Regent of Hungary, Count of Beszterce and Head of Szilágyi–Hunyadi Liga.

== Family ==
He was born in the early 15th century as vice-ispán of Bács County, son of the captain of Srebrenik, Ladislaus Szilágyi and Catherine Bellyéni. The common noble family derived its name of Horogszegi from its estate in the county of Temes. His sister, Elisabeth, was John Hunyadi's wife. Michael Szilágyi married Margarita Báthory around 1440 (marriage from which it is known that several children were born, but none reached adulthood). Another sister of Michael, Sofía Szilágyi married Juan Geréb, Voivode of Transylvania, who were the parents of the influential future Bishop and Archbishop Ladislaus Geréb.

== Life ==
Michael Szilágyi began his career in his brother-in-law's service as vice-ispán (vicecomes) of Torontál County. He was the captain of the Belgrade fortress at the Ottoman siege in 1456. As Ban of Macsó, he acquired a place among the barons He is commemorated in the Serbian epic poetry as Mihajlo Svilojević or sometimes "crni ban Mihail", while Ottoman chronicles referred to him as "Kara Mihal.

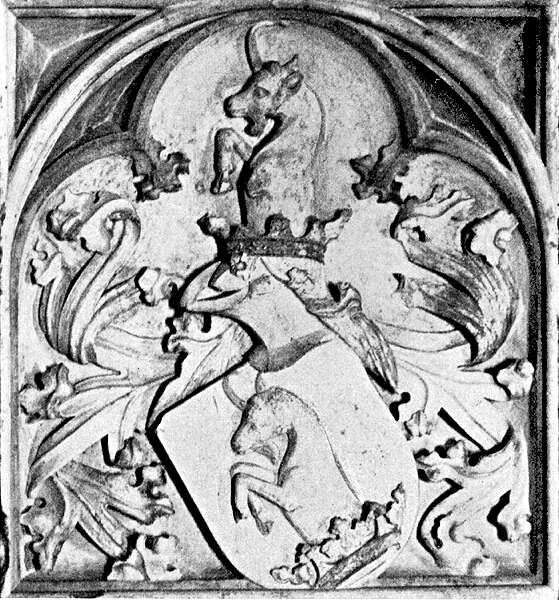
The coat-of-arms of the Szilágyi family

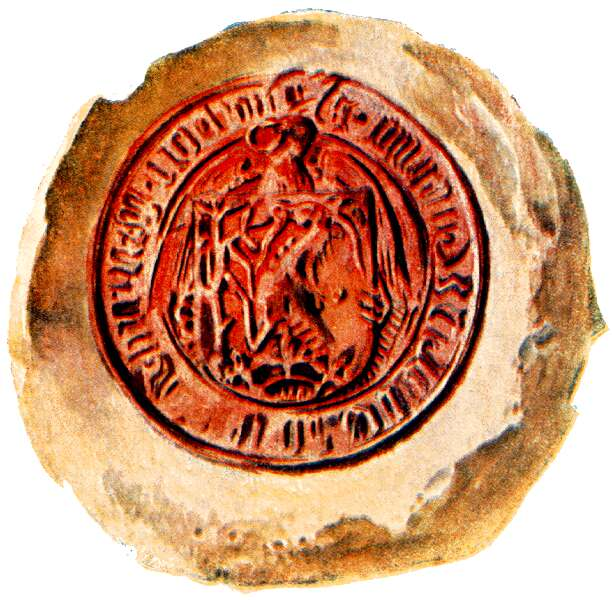
Michael Szilágyi's governor signet

On 20 January 1458, Matthias Corvinus was elected king by the Parliament. This was the first time in the medieval Hungarian kingdom that a member of the nobility, without dynastic ancestry and relationship, mounted the royal throne. Such an election upset the usual course of dynastic succession in the age. In the Czech and Hungarian states they heralded a new judiciary era in Europe, characterized by the absolute supremacy of the Parliament (dietal system) and a tendency to centralization. During his reign, Matthias reduced the power of the feudal lords, and ruled instead with a cadre of talented and highly educated individuals, chosen for their abilities rather than their social status. The Diet appointed Michael Szilágyi, the new king's uncle as regent, because of Matthias' young age. Throughout 1458 the struggle between the young king and the magnates, reinforced by Matthias's own uncle and guardian Szilágyi, was acute. But Matthias, who began by deposing Garai and dismissing Szilágyi, and then proceeded to levy a tax, without the consent of the Diet, in order to hire mercenaries, easily prevailed.

Michael Szilágyi resigned the office of regent in August 1459 and was killed by the Ottomans after being captured by Ali Bey Mihaloğlu during the Battle of Baziaș (1460) Since he was considered a spy, he was tortured and sawed in half.

== Death ==
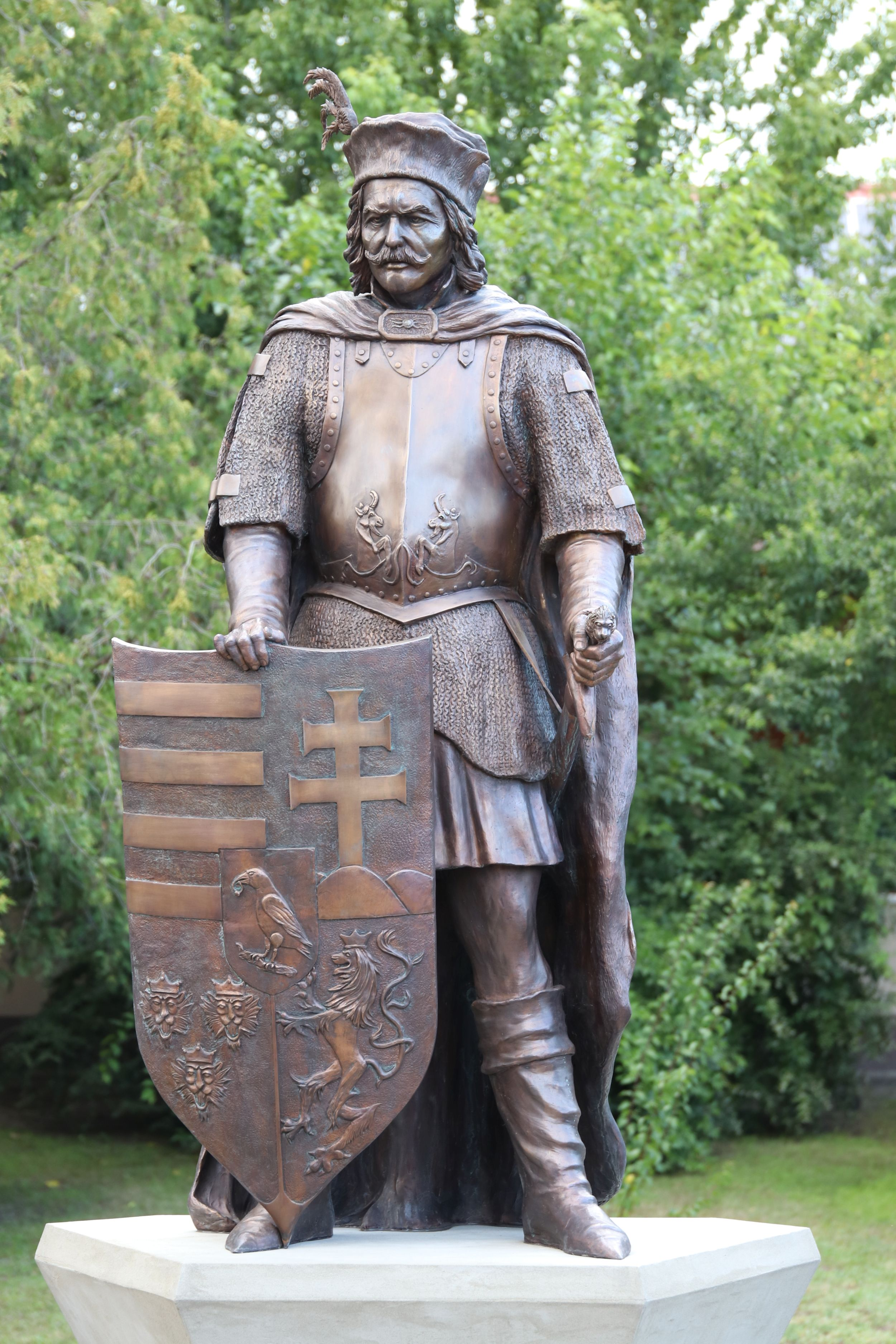
Statue of Michael Szilágyi in Ásotthalom (2019)

Still in that same year in Serbia, Szilágyi collided again on the battlefield against the Turkish commander Ali, between the places of Szendrő and Posasin. His small army, however, was soon surrounded by the Ottomans, and after a long fight, all the Hungarians, including Szilágyi, were captured by the Turks. Szilágyi was taken to Constantinople, where he was beheaded on the sultan's orders for not wanting to reveal the weak points of the fortress of Belgrade.

== Sources ==
- Fraknói Vilmos: Michael Szilágyi, The uncle of King Matthias (Bp., 1913)
- Kisfaludy Károly: Szilágyi Mihály szabadulása (színmű, Pest, 1822)
- Vörösmarty Mihály: Szilágyi Mihály a világosi várban (vers, 1822 – 1823).

Michael Szilágyi House of Szilágyi Born: c. 1400 Died: 1460
Regnal titles
Preceded by Nicholas of Ilok; Paul Herceg de Szekcső	Ban of Macsó served alongside Nicholas of Ilok; 1457–1458	Succeeded by Nicholas Dombai; Peter Szokoli
Vacant Title last held by John Hunyadi	Regent of Hungary; 1458–1459	Vacant Title next held by Lodovico Gritti
Preceded by John Hunyadi	Count of Beszterce (Bistrița); 1458–1460	Vacant
Political offices
New title	Head of Szilágyi–Hunyadi Liga with his sister Erzsébet Szilágyi	Vacant
