= Roman Kutuzov =

Roman Kutuzov may refer to:

- Roman Kutuzov (curler) (born 1986), Russian curler
- Roman Kutuzov (general) (1979–2022), Russian general
