= Nada Milošević-Đorđević =

Serbian historian (1934–2021)

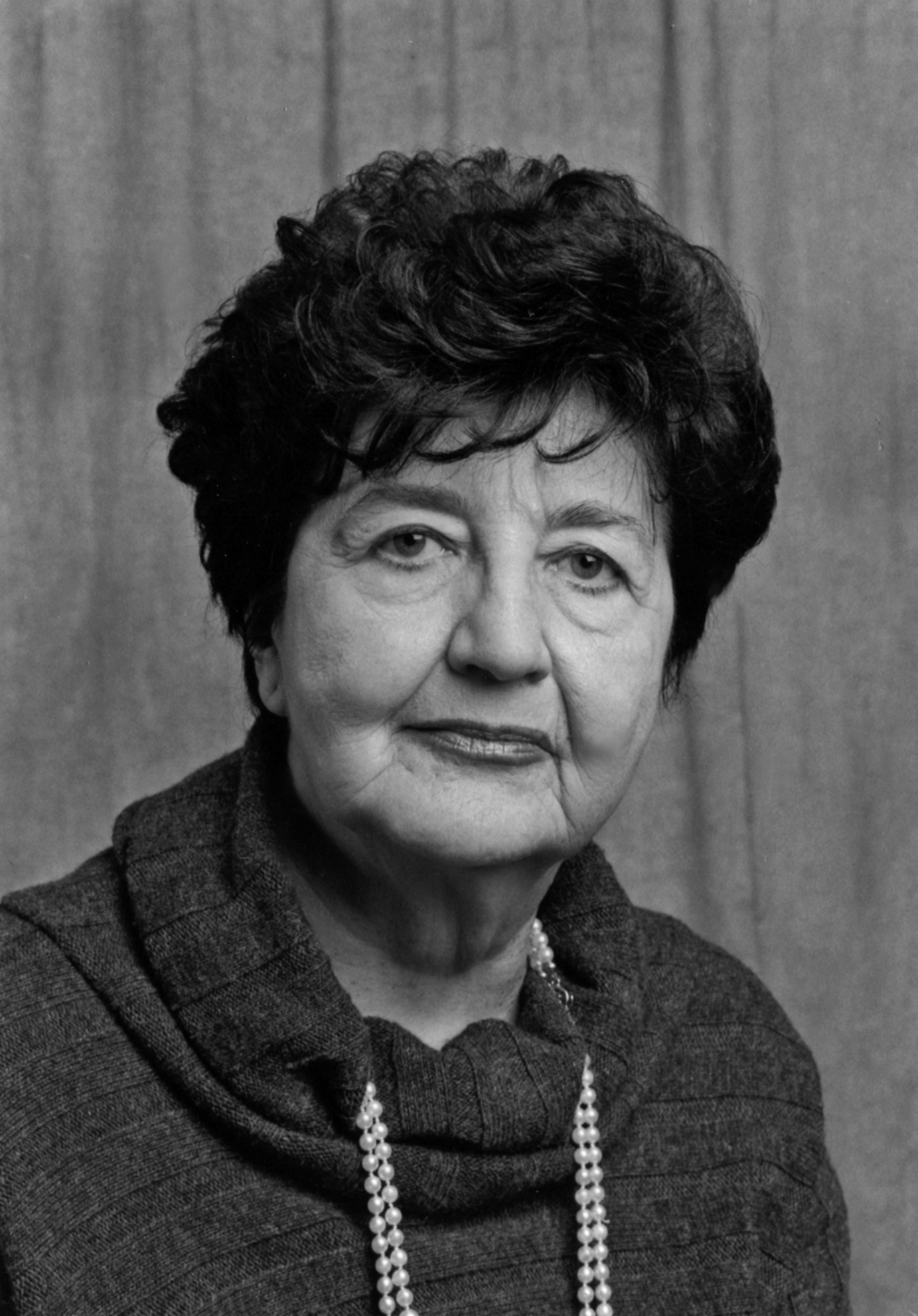
Nada Milošević-Đorđević

Nada Milošević-Đorđević (Serbian Cyrillic: Нада Милошевић-Ђорђевић; 2 December 1934 – 27 July 2021) was a Serbian literary historian and professor in the Faculty of Philology at the University of Belgrade.

She was born in the then Kingdom of Yugoslavia. She was a corresponding member of the Serbian Academy of Sciences and Arts, in which she was engaged as a member of the editorial board of the Serbian Encyclopedia, the president of the Board for Folk Literature, and a member of the Administrative Board of the Endowment of Branko Ćopić. She published many works in the field of folk literature.
