= Ilya Golenishchev-Kutuzov =

- Илья́ Никола́евич Голени́щев-Куту́зов
- Born: Ilya Nikolaevich Golenishchev-Kutuzov; 1904
- Died: 1969 (aged 64–65)
- Occupations: Philologist; poet; translator

Ilya Nikolaevich Golenishchev-Kutuzov (Russian: Илья́ Никола́евич Голени́щев-Куту́зов, IPA: [ɪˈlʲjæ nʲɪkɐˈlajɪvʲɪdʑ ɡəlʲɪˈnʲiɕːɪf kʊˈtuzəf]; 1904–1969) was a Soviet philologist, poet, and translator. He was an expert on Romanic and Slavic philology, and comparative literature. He authored works on Dante Alighieri and the Renaissance literature.
