= Czech Renaissance architecture =

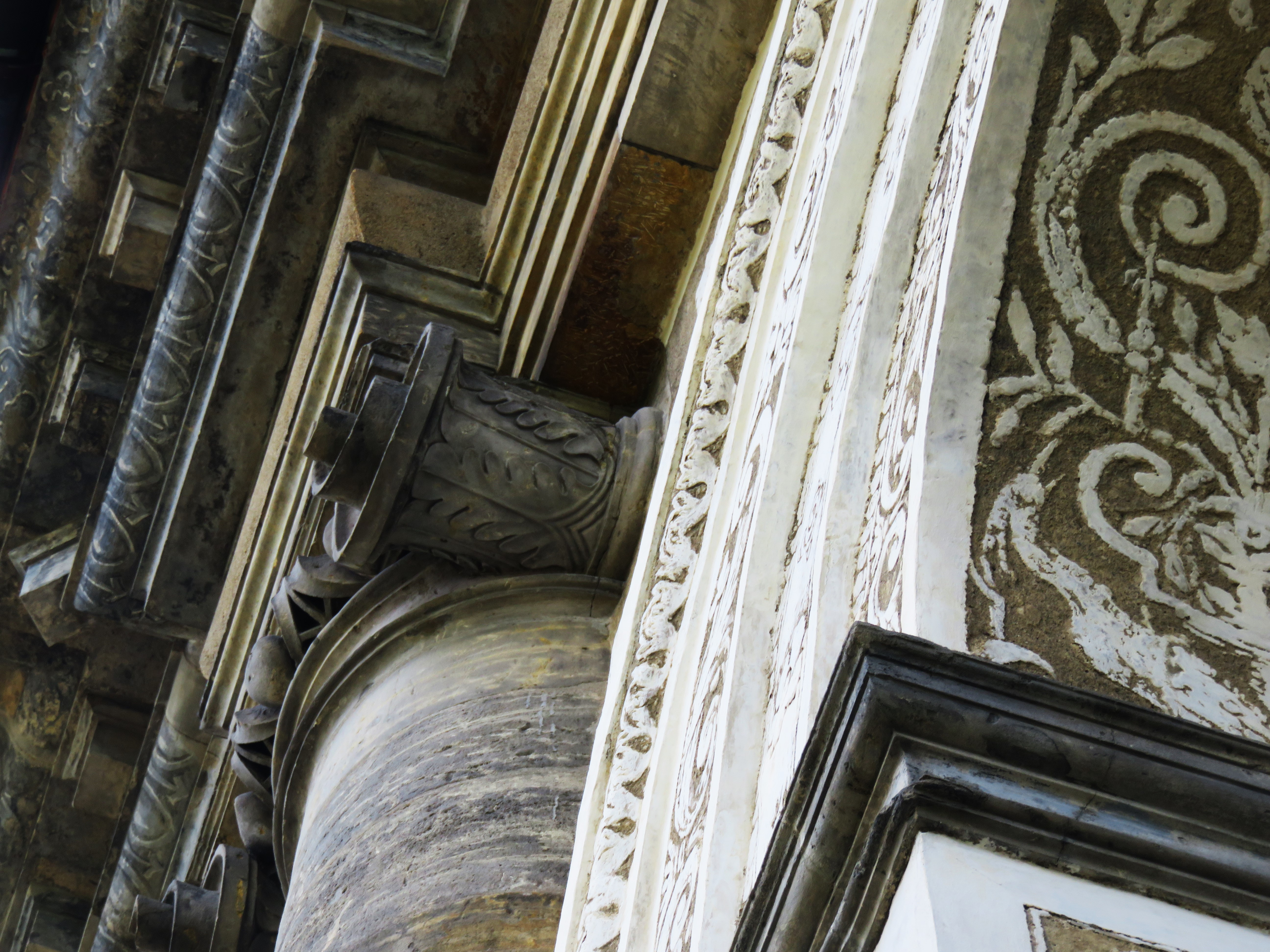
Detail of the facade of the Ball Game Hall in Prague Royal Garden with sgraffito and Ionic column built by Bonifác Wohlmut in 1569

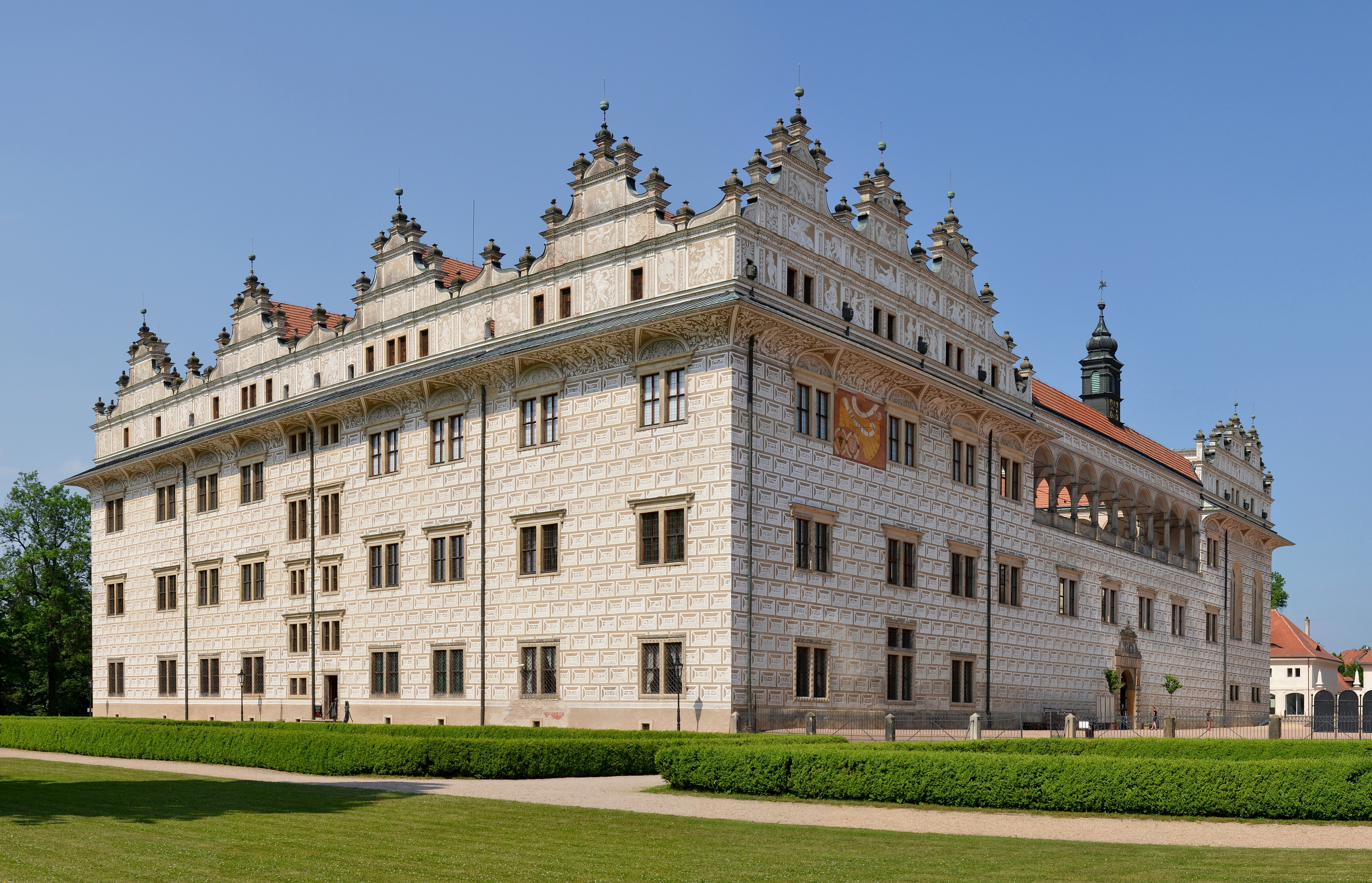
Litomyšl Castle built by Ulrico Aostalli in 1575–81

Czech Renaissance architecture refers to the architectural period of the early modern era in Bohemia, Moravia and Czech Silesia, which then comprised the Crown of Bohemia and today constitute the Czech Republic. The Renaissance style flourished in the Czech lands from the late 15th century to the first half of the 17th century.

In the Crown of Bohemia as well as in other parts of Central Europe the Renaissance style was accepted slower than in southern Europe and its development was delayed in comparison with Italy. It was partly caused by the situation in the Kingdom after the Hussite Wars. The Bohemian Reformation was mistrustful of the influences coming from "papal" Italy and rather respected the traditional values expressed with the older Gothic style. Therefore, the first examples of Renaissance architecture in the Czech lands can be found in the domains of the Catholic aristocracy or the Catholic king. The Renaissance style first appeared in the Czech Kingdom in the 1490s. Bohemia (together with its incorporated lands, especially Moravia) thus ranked among the areas of the Holy Roman Empire with the earliest known examples of Renaissance architecture.

The lands of the Bohemian Crown were never part of the ancient Roman Empire, thus they missed their own ancient classical heritage and had to be dependent on the primarily Italian models. As well as in other Central European countries the Gothic style kept its position especially in church architecture. The traditional Gothic architecture was considered timeless and therefore able to express the eternity of God or to emphasize the long tradition of the place where it was used. The Renaissance architecture coexisted with the Gothic style in Bohemia and Moravia until the late 16th century (e. g. the residential part of a palace was built in the modern Renaissance style but its chapel was designed with Gothic elements).

The facades of Czech Renaissance buildings were often decorated with sgraffito (figural or ornamental). The figural sgraffito as well as relief decorations usually drew inspiration from the Bible or ancient mythology.

== Secular architecture ==
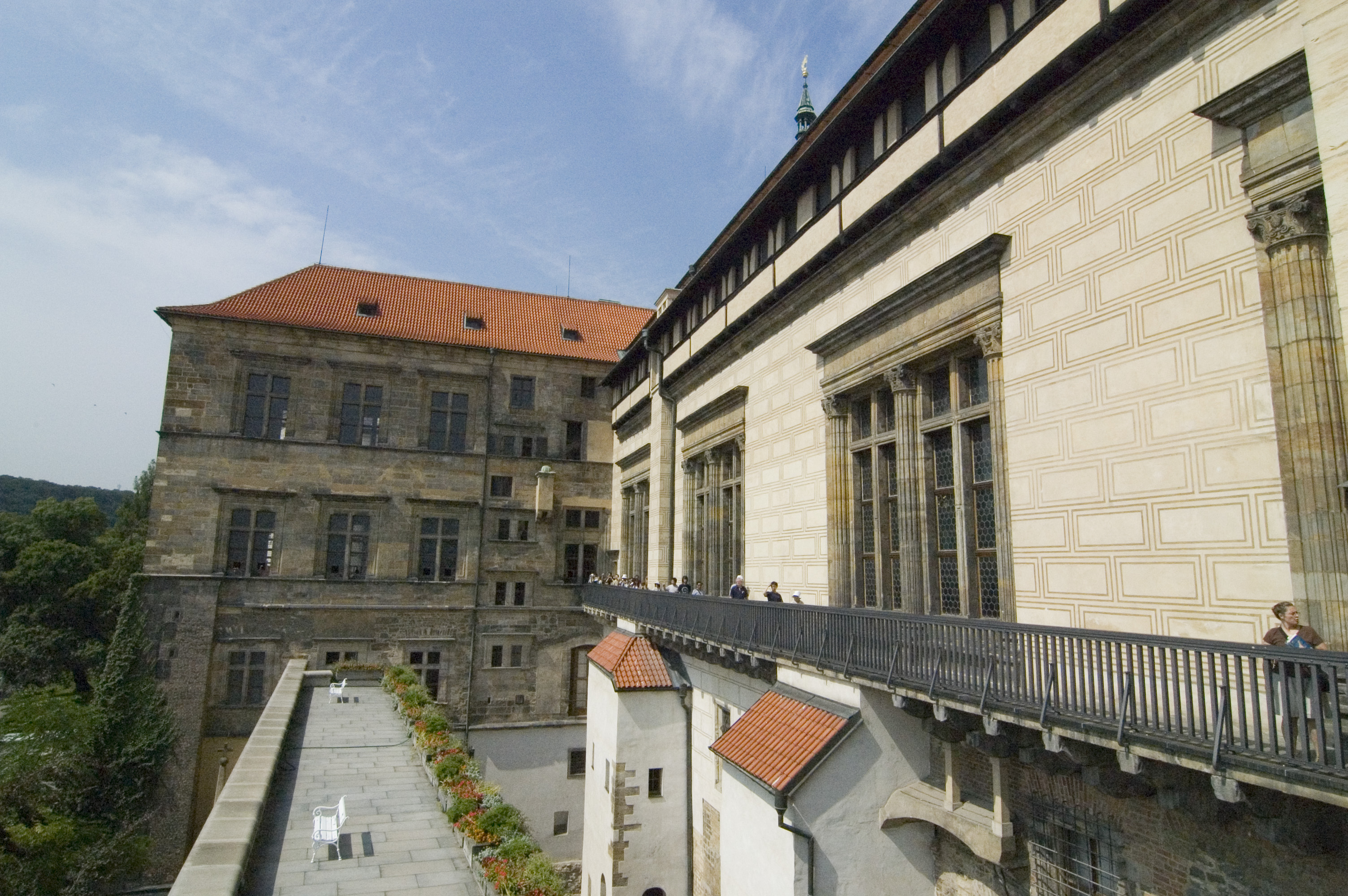
Prague Old Royal Palace with windows of Vladislav Hall and Louis' Wing in the background, the 1st Renaissance residence in Bohemia

=== Jagiellonian period ===
The earliest known elements of Renaissance architecture in the Czech lands are the portals of two Moravian aristocratic residences in Moravská Třebová and Tovačov. Both date from 1492. In the same time the Royal Palace in Prague Castle, in the capital of the Bohemian Kingdom, was rebuilt under the King Vladislaus II. The newly built great ceremonial hall named after the King (Vladislav Hall) has been illuminated by a row of big rectangular windows which are the earliest Renaissance architectural elements in Prague. One of them bears the date 1493. The architect of Vladislav Hall was Benedikt Rejt who later also built the Louis' Wing of the Royal Palace (1503–1509), considered the oldest Renaissance residential building in Bohemia, although the ceilings were designed in the form of Gothic rib vaults.

Although the Gothic style remained the leading style in Bohemia under the Jagiellonian dynasty (1471–1526), it started to be increasingly mixed with Renaissance elements. This phase of Czech architecture has been often called Jagiellonian Gothic but it can be also regarded as the early phase of the Renaissance style in Bohemia.

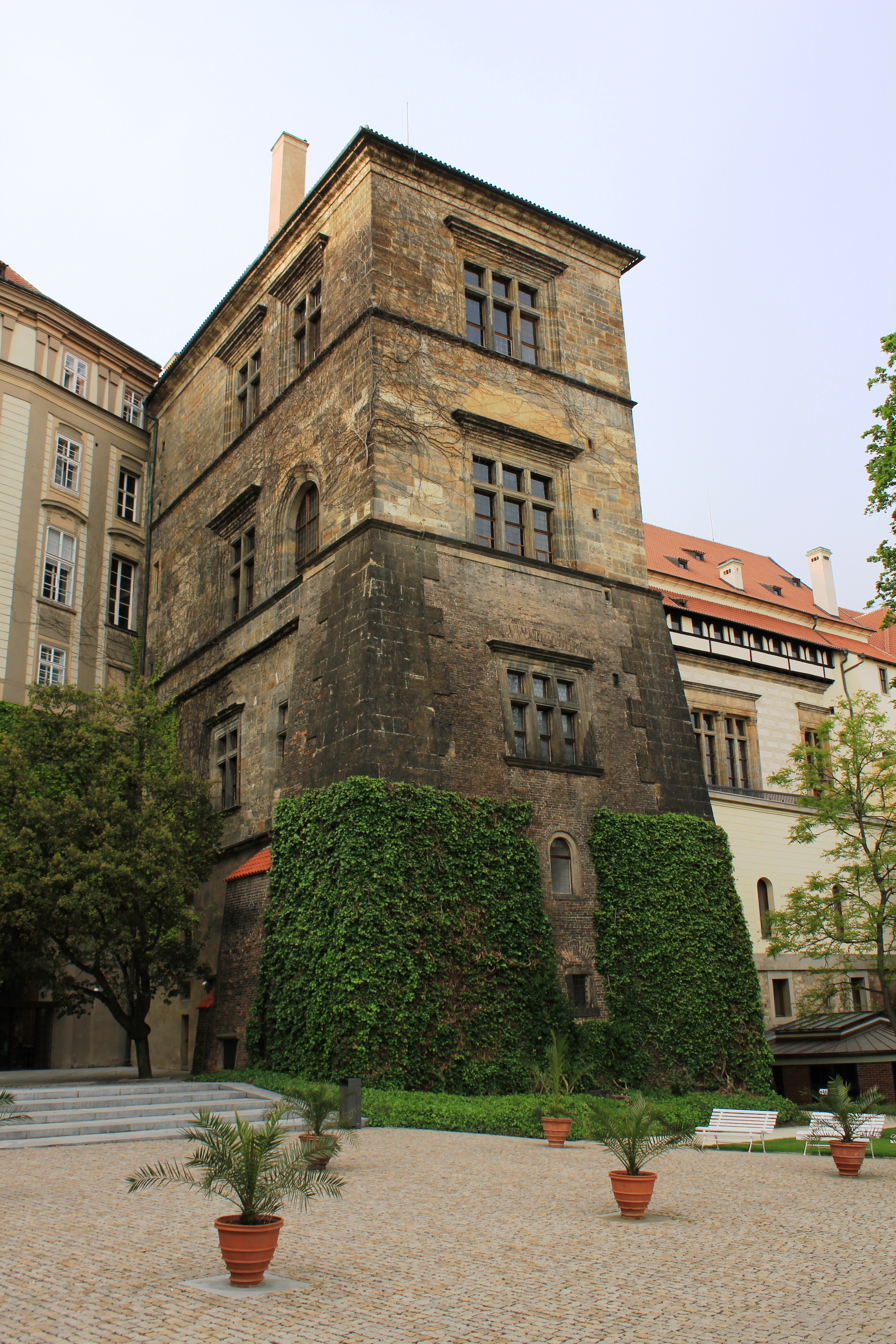
Louis' Wing in Prague Castle built in 1503–1509

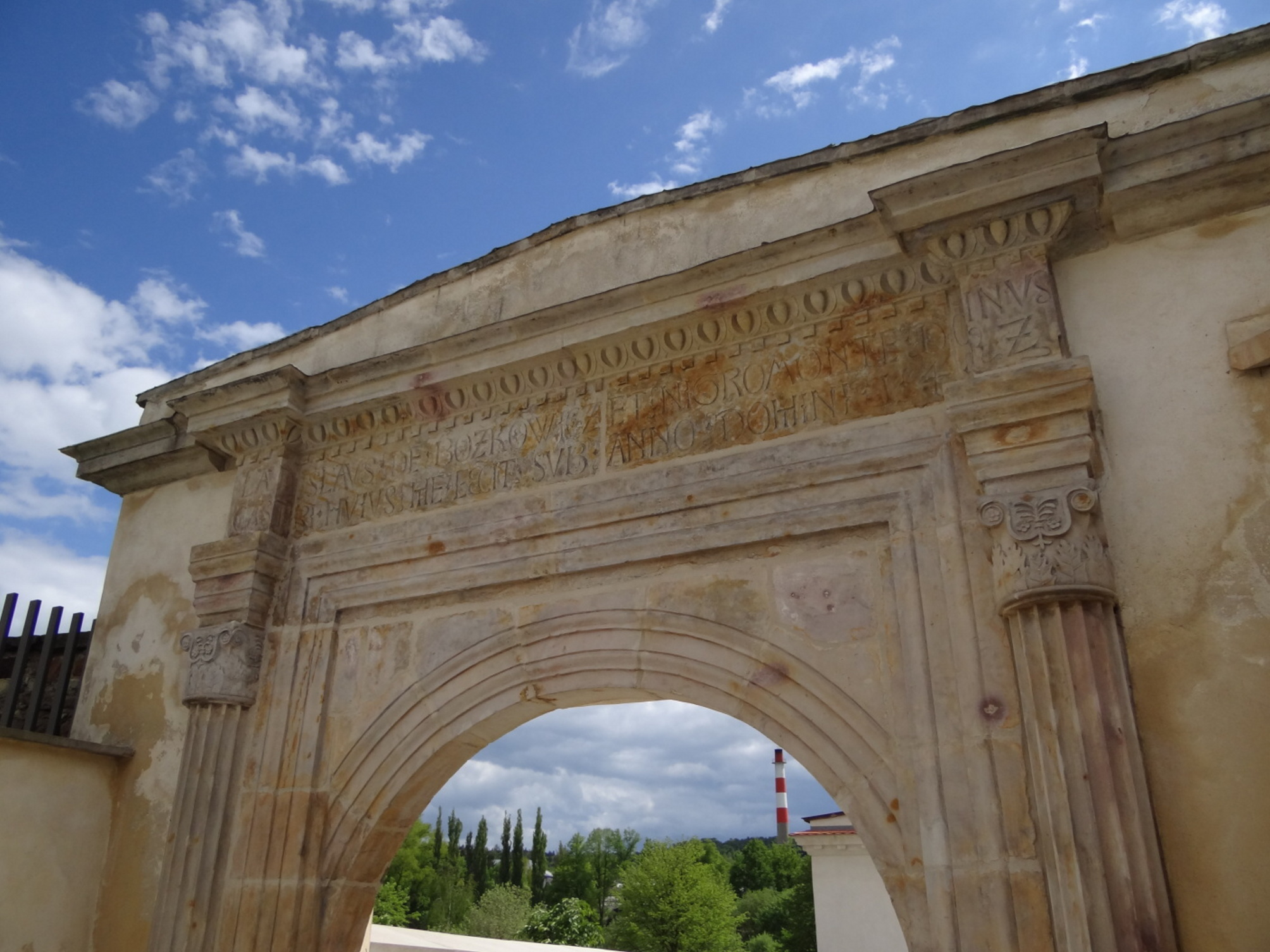
Portal in Moravská Třebová Castle from 1492

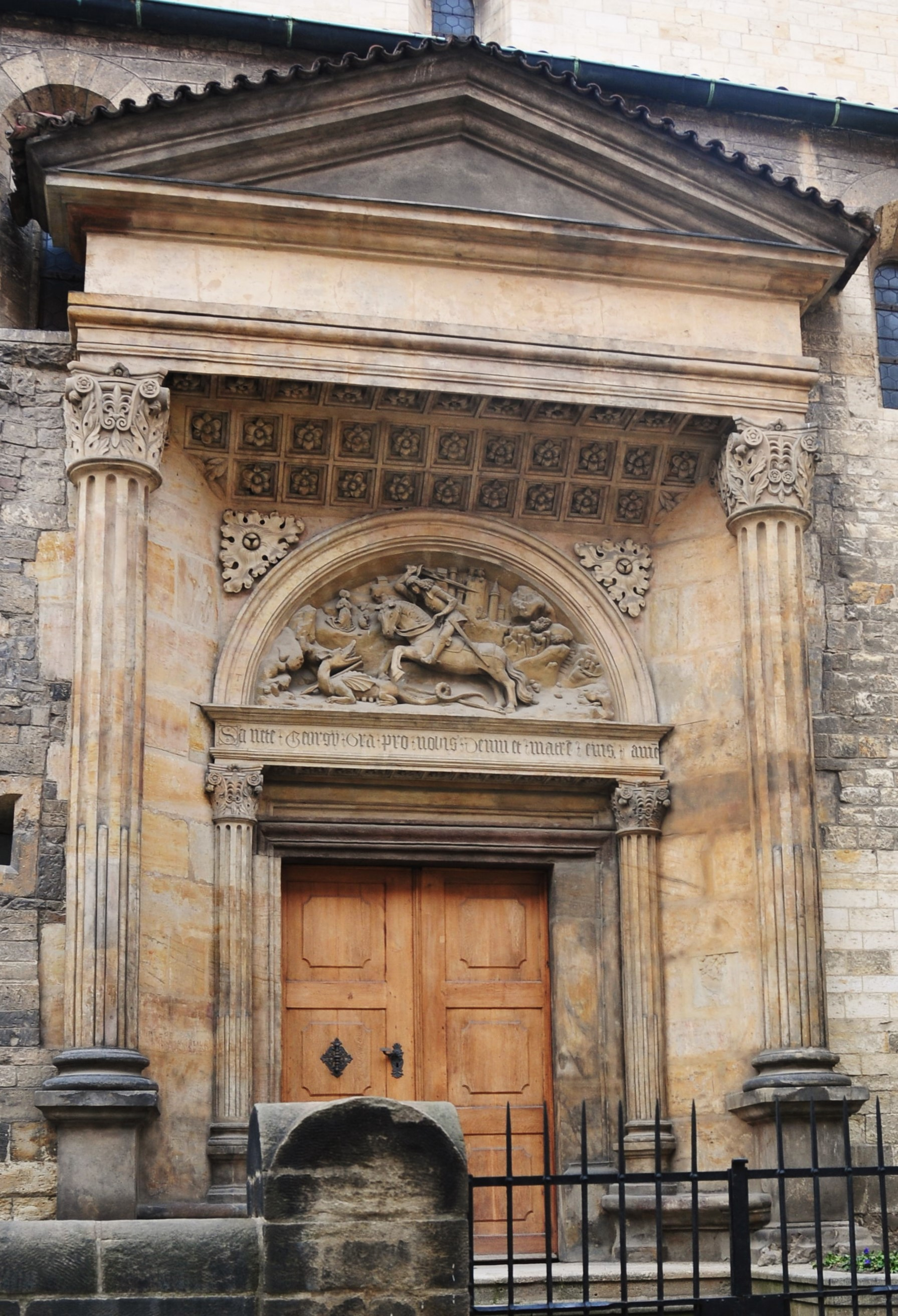
Portal of St. George's Church in Prague Castle, around 1510

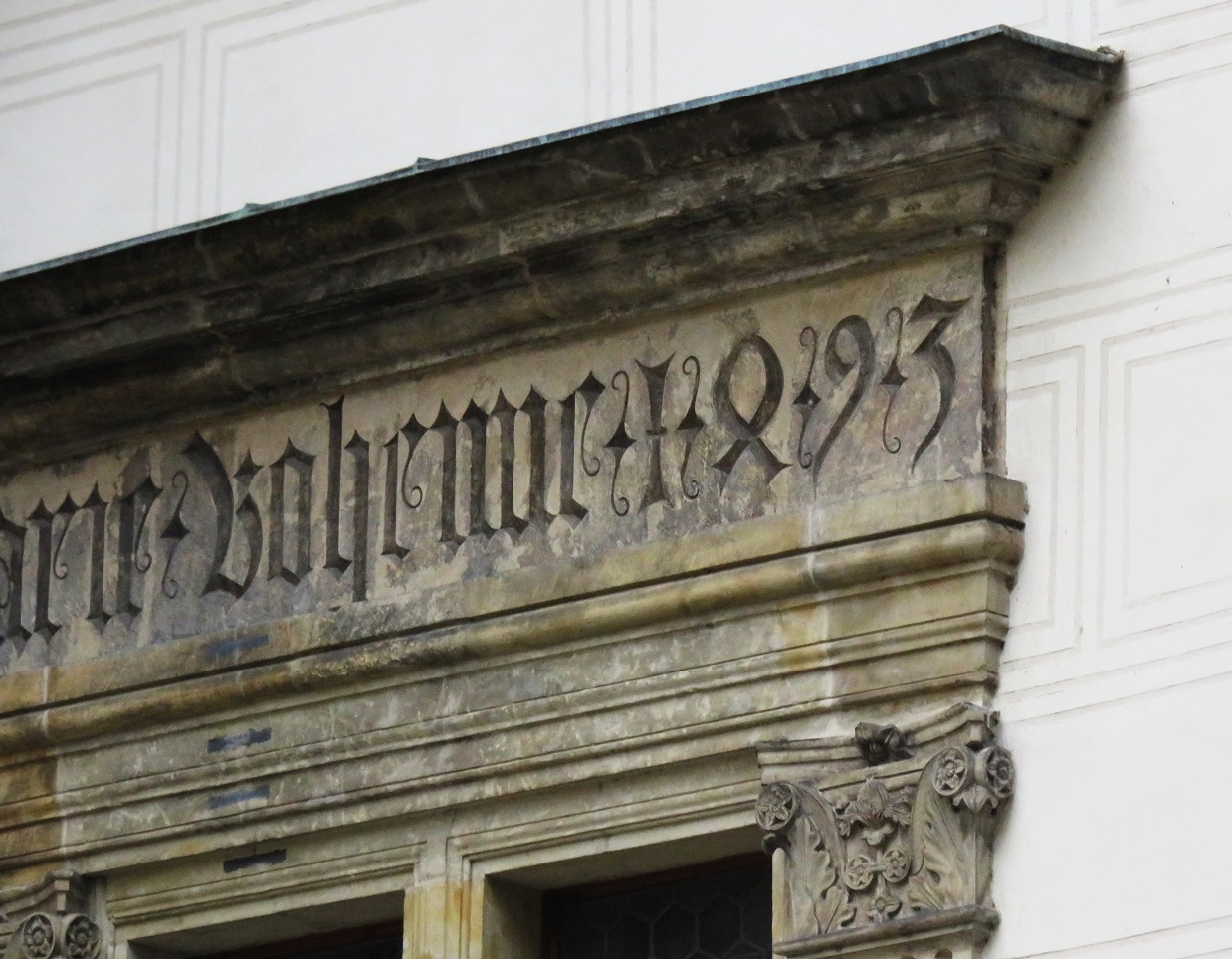
The date 1493 on the earliest Renaissance window in Bohemia. One of the windows of Vladislav Hall in Prague Castle.

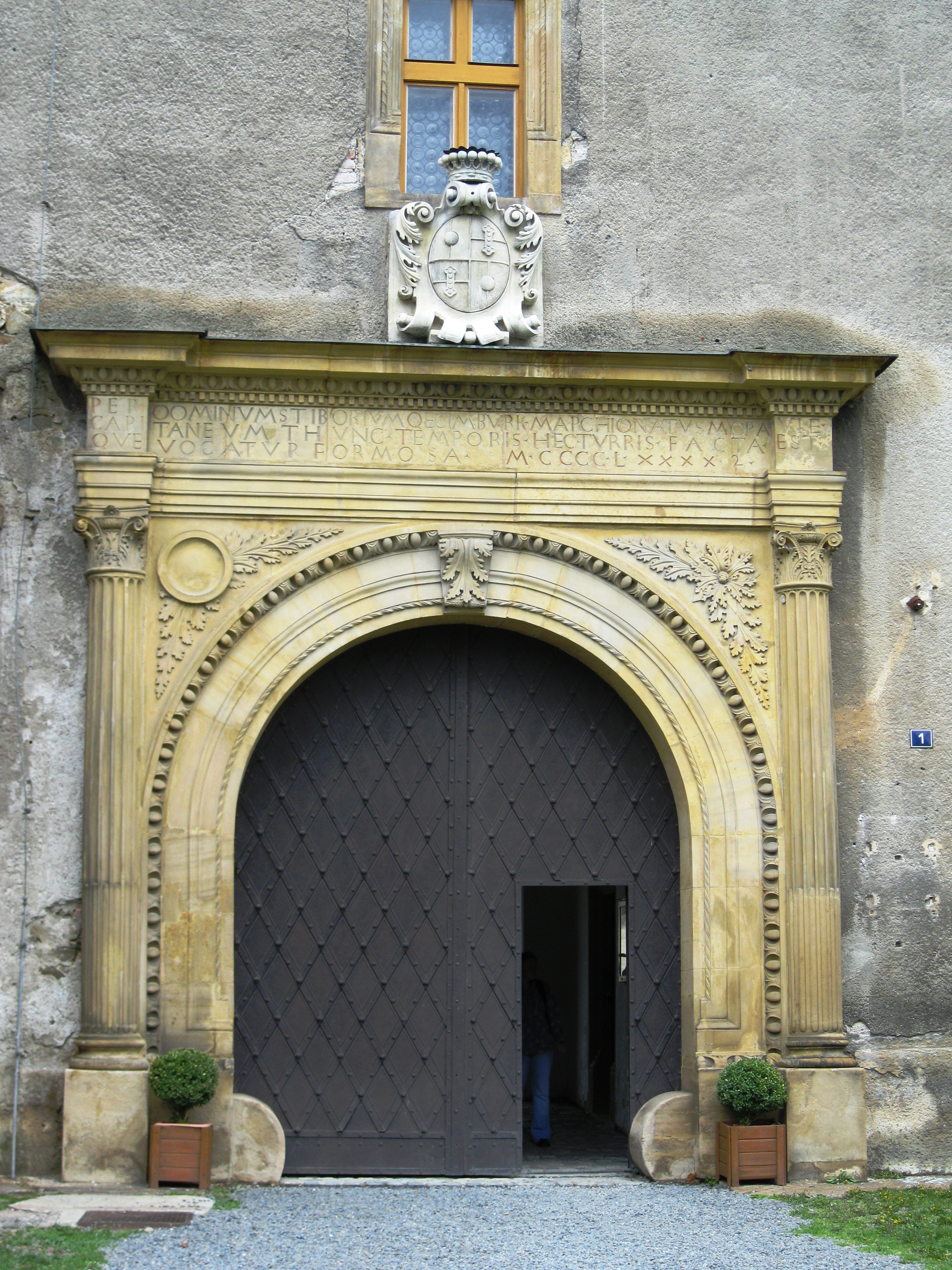
Portal in Tovačov Castle from 1492

=== Habsburg period ===
The direct influence of the Italian Renaissance architecture came first after the accession of Ferdinand I of Habsburg to the Bohemian throne. In 1538–1563 Ferdinand built Queen Anne's Summer Palace (also known as Belvedere), situated in the newly established Royal Garden of Prague Castle. The Summer Palace with relief decorations and arcades in the basement which support the large balcony is considered the purest sample of the Italian Renaissance architecture north of the Alps, although it does not have any direct model in Italy. Under his reign in 1555–1558 another summer palace (Lustschloss) for the royal family was built near Prague in the shape of a star, the so-called Star Summer Palace on the White Mountain (Czech: letohrádek Hvězda), which was probably designed by King's son Archduke Ferdinand. The most significant Renaissance architects who worked for the royal and imperial court at Prague Castle were Paolo della Stella and Bonifác Wolmut, and Giovanni Maria Philippi.

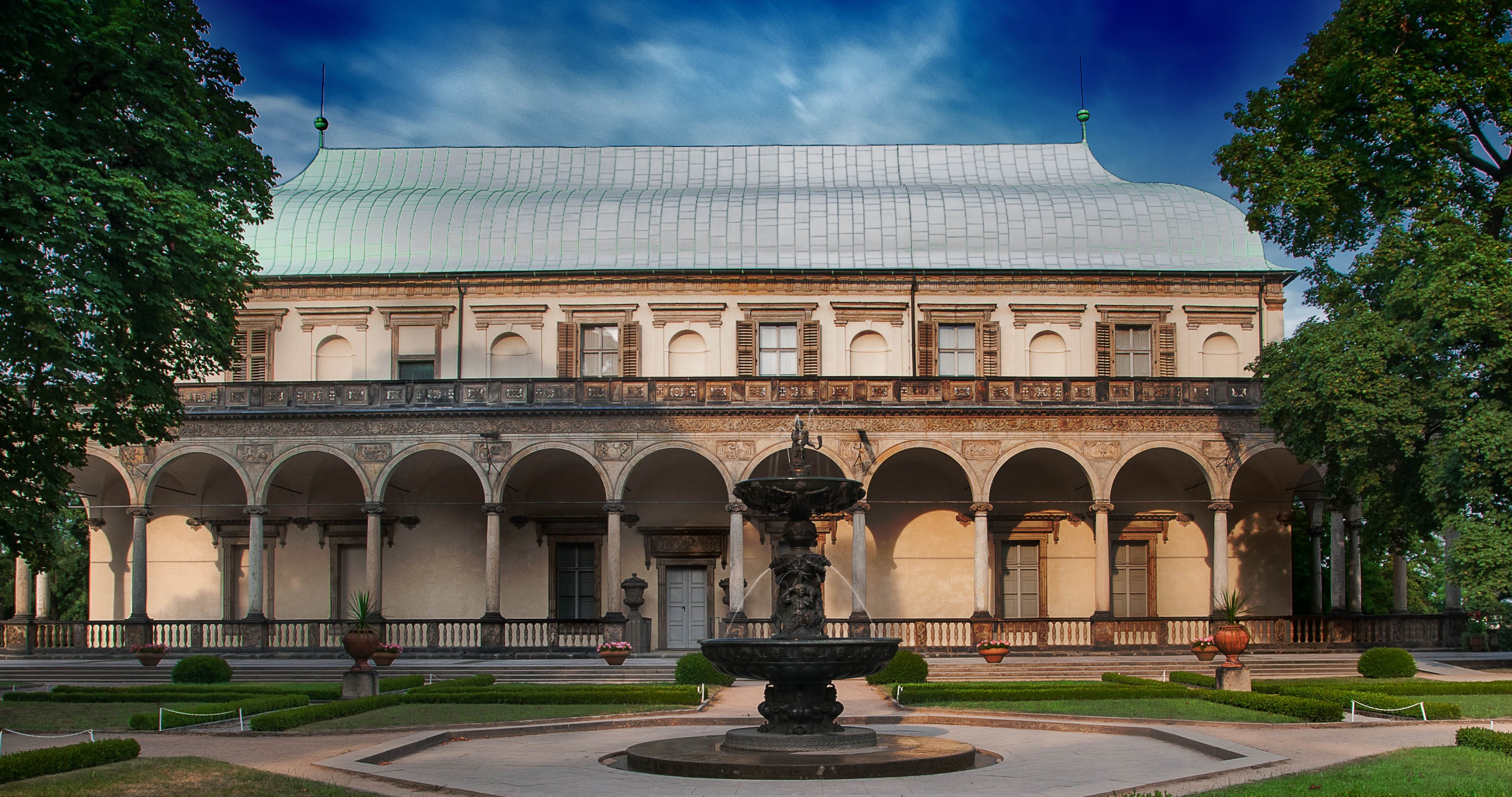
Queen Anne's Summer Palace in the Royal Garden of Prague Castle, built in 1538–1563

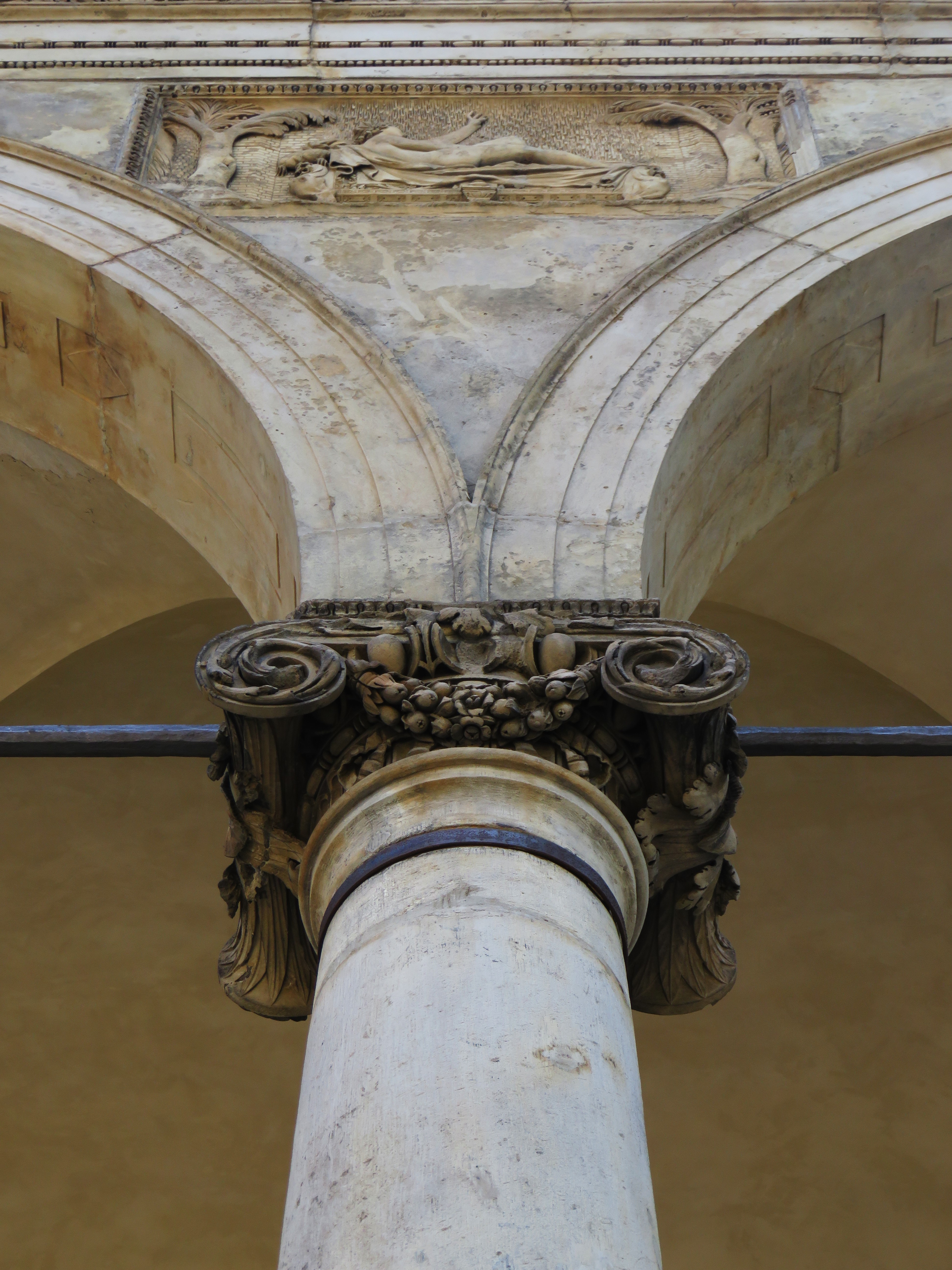
Detail of the column of Royal Summer Palace

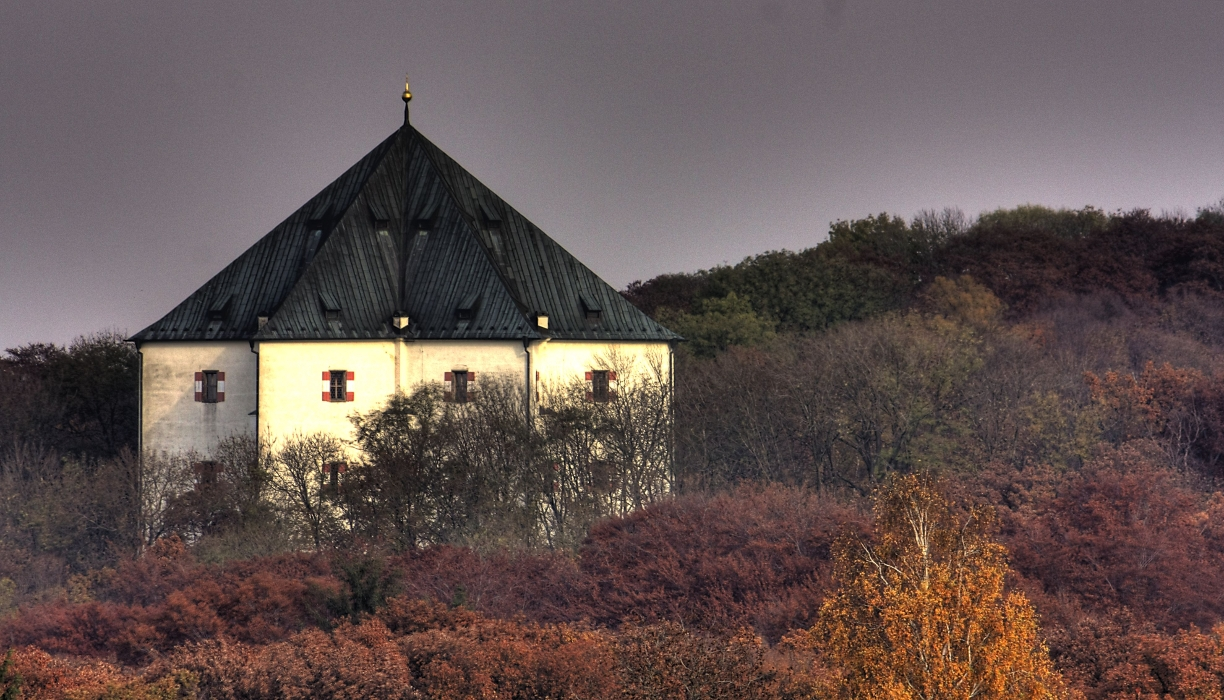
Hvězda – summer house of the royal family built in the shape of a star in 1555–1558

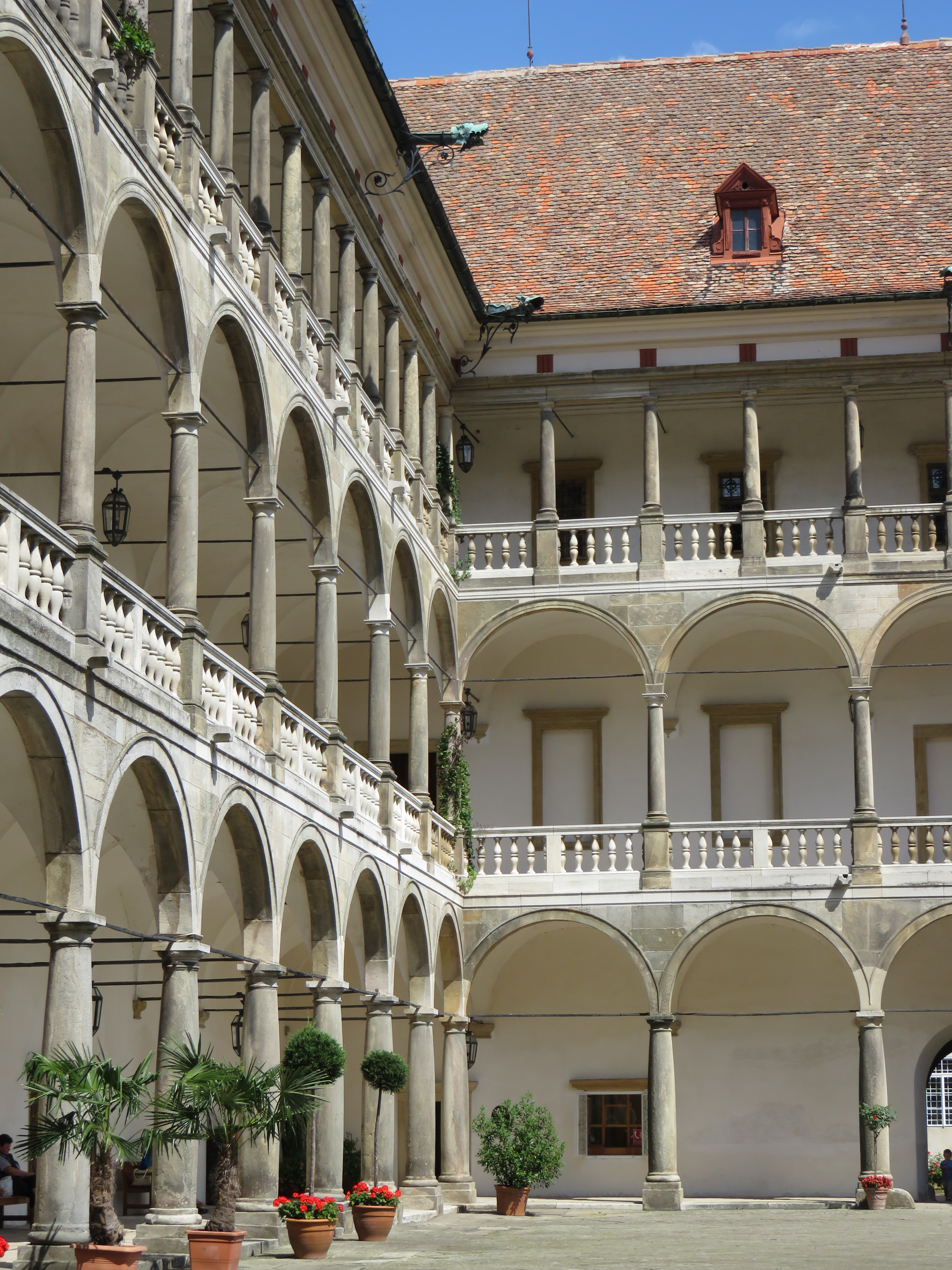
Arcades of Opočno Castle

The transformation of medieval Prague into a Renaissance city was accelerated by a great fire of Malá Strana, Hradčany and Prague Castle in 1541. After the fire many originally civic houses were rebuilt as aristocratic residences, e. g. Schwarzenberg Palace, Martinic Palace and Palace of the lords of Hradec, all of them with rich embellished sgraffito facades.

In the 16th century, the humanist-educated nobility moved from uncomfortable Gothic castles to newly built spacious Renaissance castles with elegant arcade courtyards and geometrically arranged gardens with fountains and statues. Emphasis was placed on comfort, and buildings for entertainment purposes also appeared (e. g. ball-game halls, summer houses). The most significant Czech Renaissance castles are: Litomyšl, Telč, Český Krumlov, Kratochvíle, Jindřichův Hradec, Nelahozeves, Opočno, Pardubice, Horšovský Týn, Bechyně, Frýdlant, Velké Losiny, Benátky nad Jizerou, Benešov nad Ploučnicí, Kostelec nad Černými lesy, Kaceřov, Moravská Třebová and Bučovice.

The following cities are famous for their Renaissance urban architecture: Český Krumlov, Telč, Nové Město nad Metují, Pardubice, Jindřichův Hradec, Slavonice, Chrudim and Prachatice. Many town halls were built in the Renaissance style, e. g. in Litoměřice, Nymburk, Prostějov, Volyně, Stříbro, Plzeň and Hradčany and Malá Strana in Prague.

During the 16th century Italian architects, builders, masons and artists in general became very popular in the Bohemian Crown. Very significant were Ulrico Aostalli and Baldassare Maggi who worked in Bohemia.

During the reign of Holy Roman Emperor and Bohemian King Rudolph II, the city of Prague became one of the most important European centers of the late Renaissance art (so-called Mannerism). The Italian architect Giovanni Maria Philippi rebuilt and extended the New Royal Palace in Prague Castle for the Emperor. Unfortunately only some parts of it have been preserved (Matthias Gate, Spanish Hall). Rudolph also built the church of St. Rochus in Hradčany near the Strahov Monastery. Very important late Renaissance building of this period is the Italian Chapel of Clementinum in the Old Town of Prague.

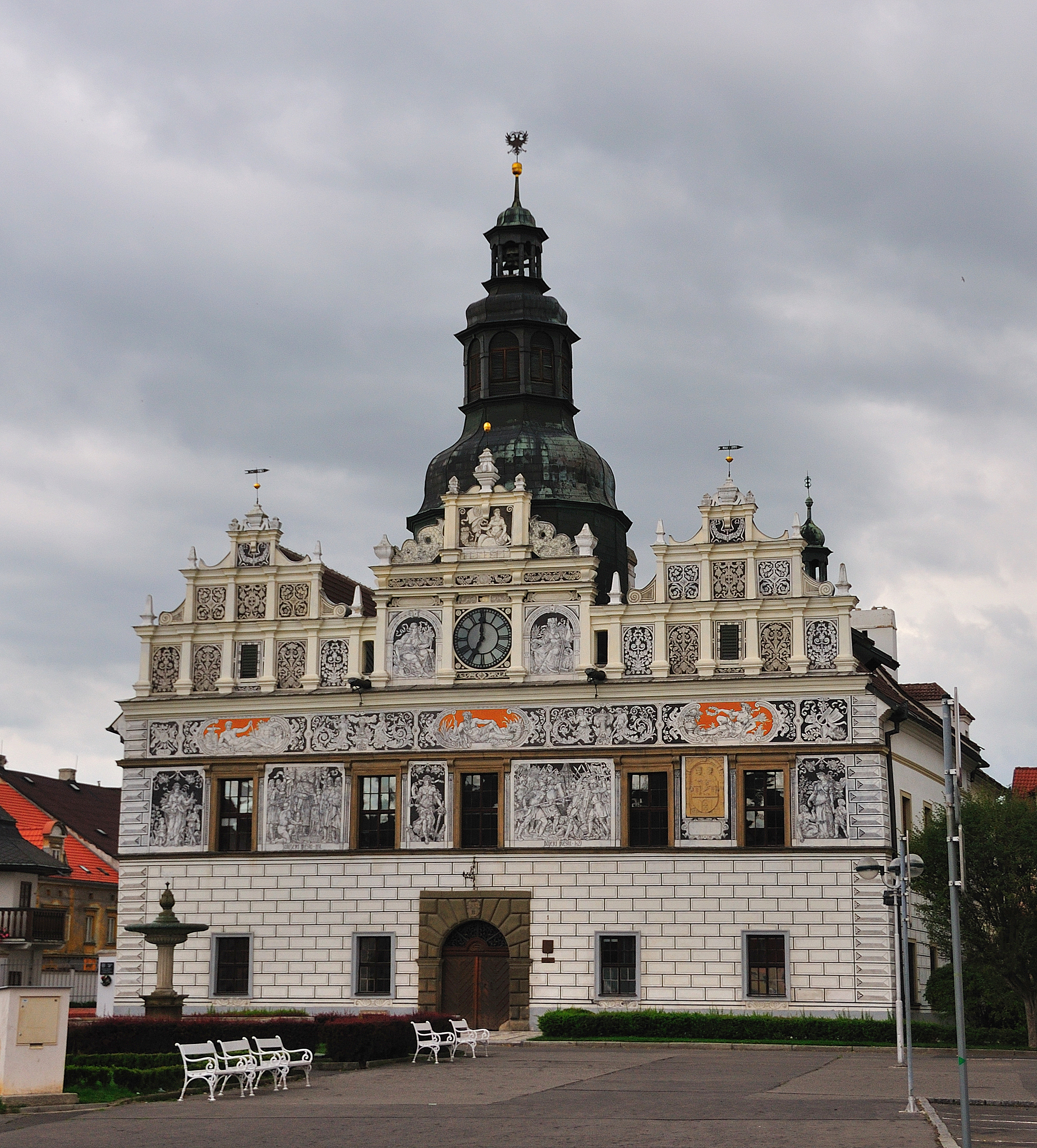
Town Hall in Stříbro

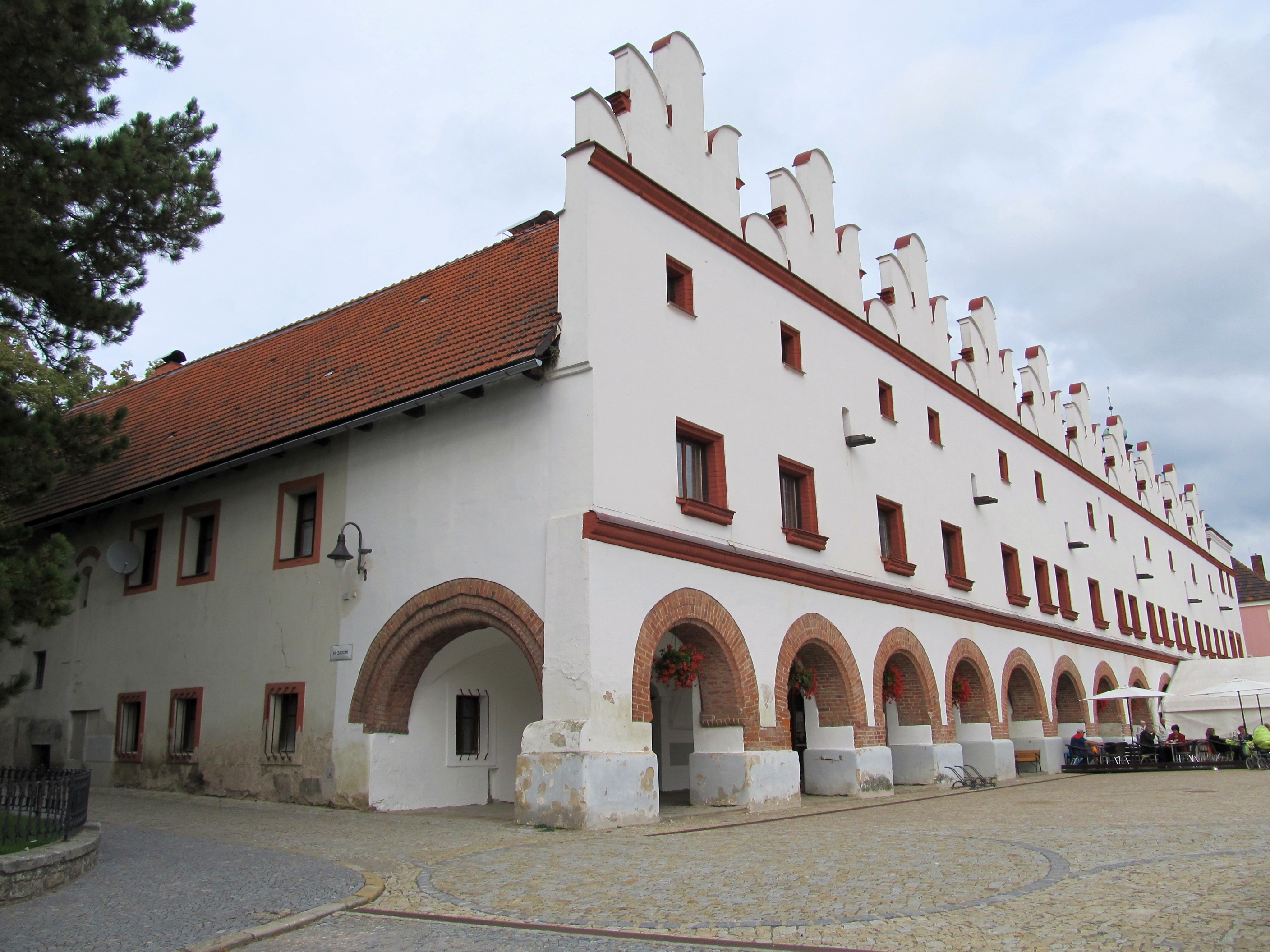
Row of Renaissance houses in Nové Město nad Metují

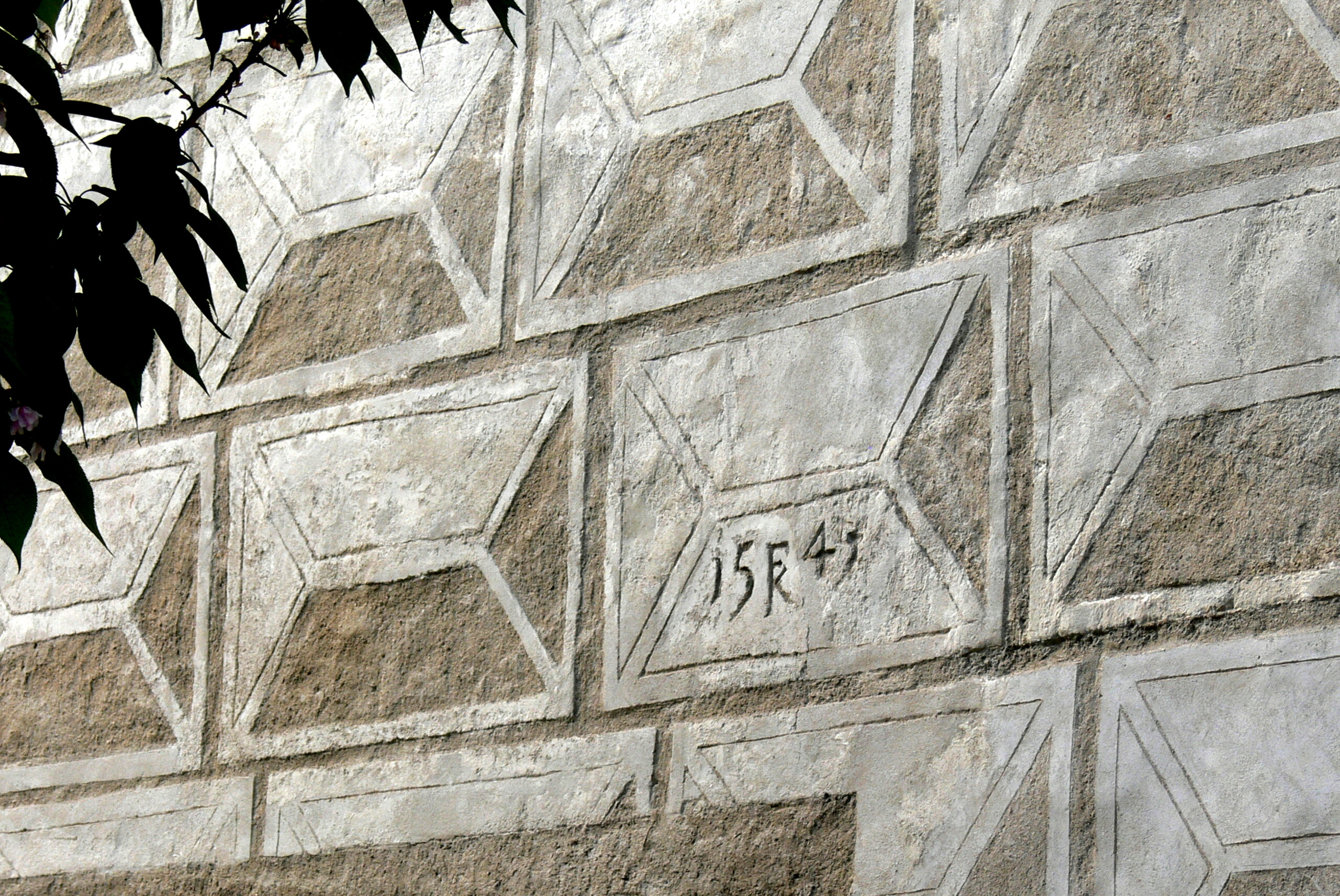
Sgraffito facade in Slavonice with the date 1545

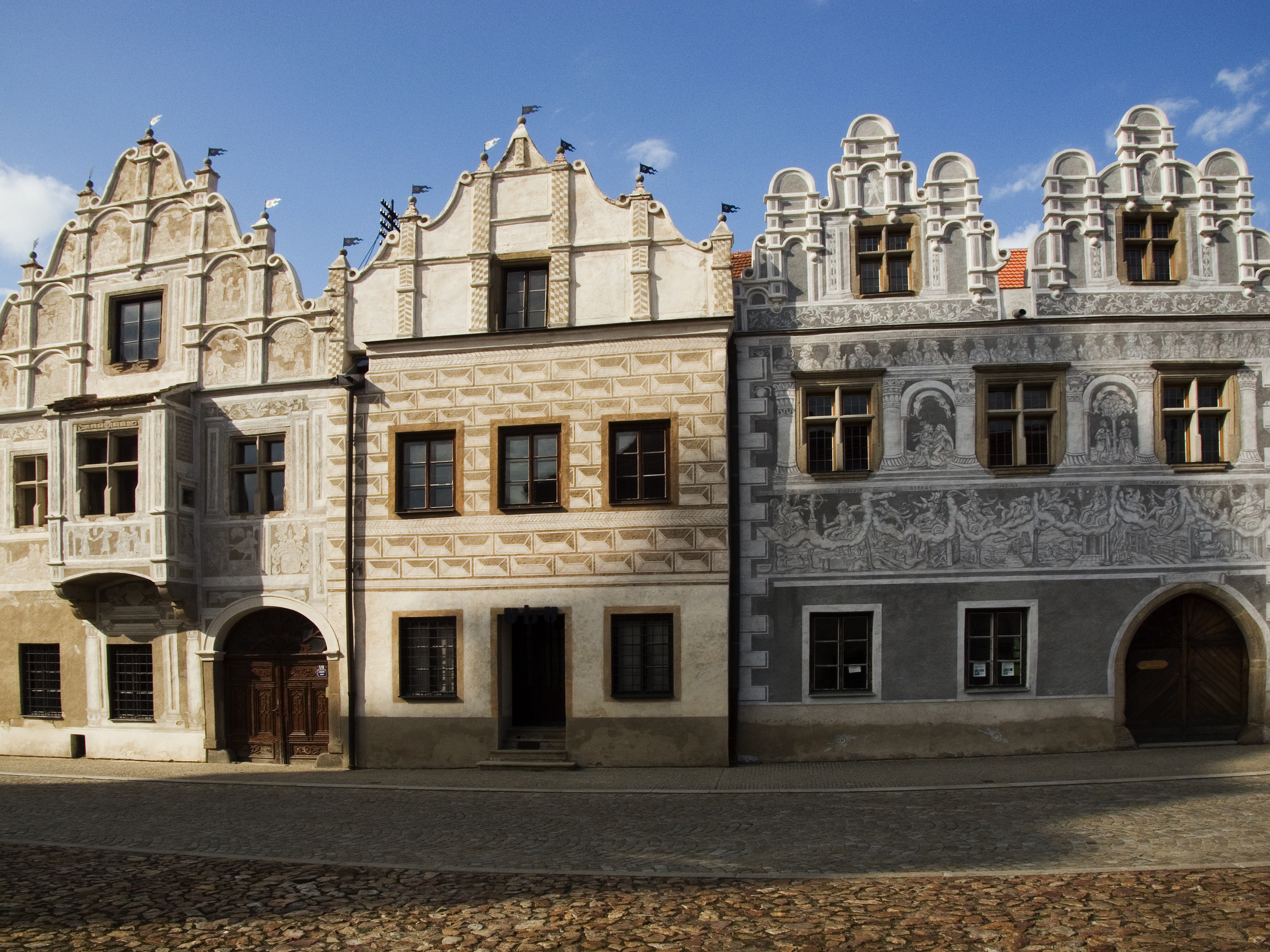
Houses in Slavonice

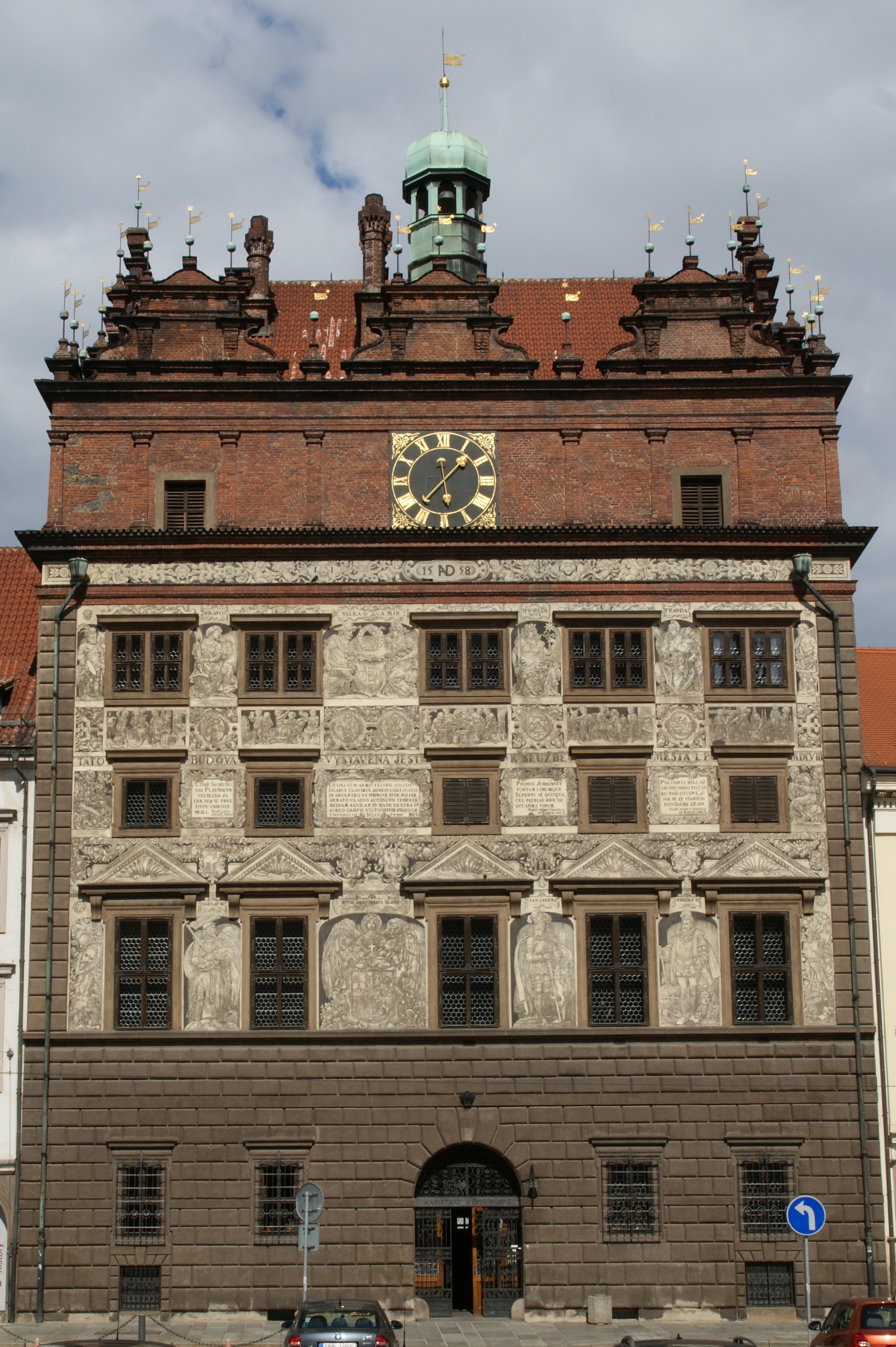
Town Hall in Plzeň

== Sacred architecture ==
During the time of Renaissance the position of the church institutions was very weak in Bohemia as a result of the Bohemian Reformation. During the Hussite Wars (1419–1434) many monasteries were destroyed or lost their goods. The archbishopric of Prague became vacant until 1561 and the bishopric of Litomyšl ceased to exist. Their property was secularized. Until the 17th century the church institutions in Bohemia did not have enough resources to finance the construction of new religious buildings. Therefore, the Renaissance sacred architecture is rarer than the Gothic or Baroque sacred architecture in the Crown of Bohemia. The Renaissance monastic architecture is rather exceptional in Bohemia and Moravia. The churches newly built during the 16th century were mostly sponsored by noble families, municipalities and by the royal court.

The Czech Renaissance churches were usually strongly inspired by the Gothic sacred architecture. During the 16th century, the Gothic forms became an expression of sacredness. The Renaissance churches often combine the Renaissance architecture with some Gothic elements such as rib vaults or stone traceries in the windows.

In Holy Trinity Church in Opočno the Renaissance Corinthian pillars are supporting a Gothic rib vault built in 1567. The Lutheran Renaissance church of Christ the Savior in the Old Town of Prague built in the 1610s has a traditional ground plan and uses stone traceries in the windows which in other respects do not resemble Gothic windows. The Catholic Church of St. Rochus was built in 1602–1612 on an unusual composite ground plan.

In the Renaissance period the construction of several Gothic churches was completed. The churches of Our Lady of the Snows and of the Assumption of Mary and St. Charlemagne in the New Town of Prague got their present ceilings in the form of Gothic-like rib vaults.

The Swiss Italian architect of the Church of Saints Peter and Paul in Volenice Tomasso Rossi di Mendrizio was influenced by the local Bohemian culture and designed a new vault of the church inspired by late Gothic rib vaulting. Other notable Czech Renaissance churches are the Church of Saints Peter and Paul in Kralovice, St. Martin's Church in Měrotín, St. Michael's Church in Branná, Church of St. John the Baptist in Velké Losiny, Church of St. Wenceslaus in Rudník, and the churches of the Unity of the Brethren in Mladá Boleslav and Lipník nad Bečvou. The Chapel of St. John the Baptist in Archbishop's Palace in Prague is a very well-preserved gem of Renaissance sacred interiors in Bohemia. Another notable Renaissance chapel is St. Stanislaus Chapel in the Cathedral of St. Wenceslaus in Olomouc.

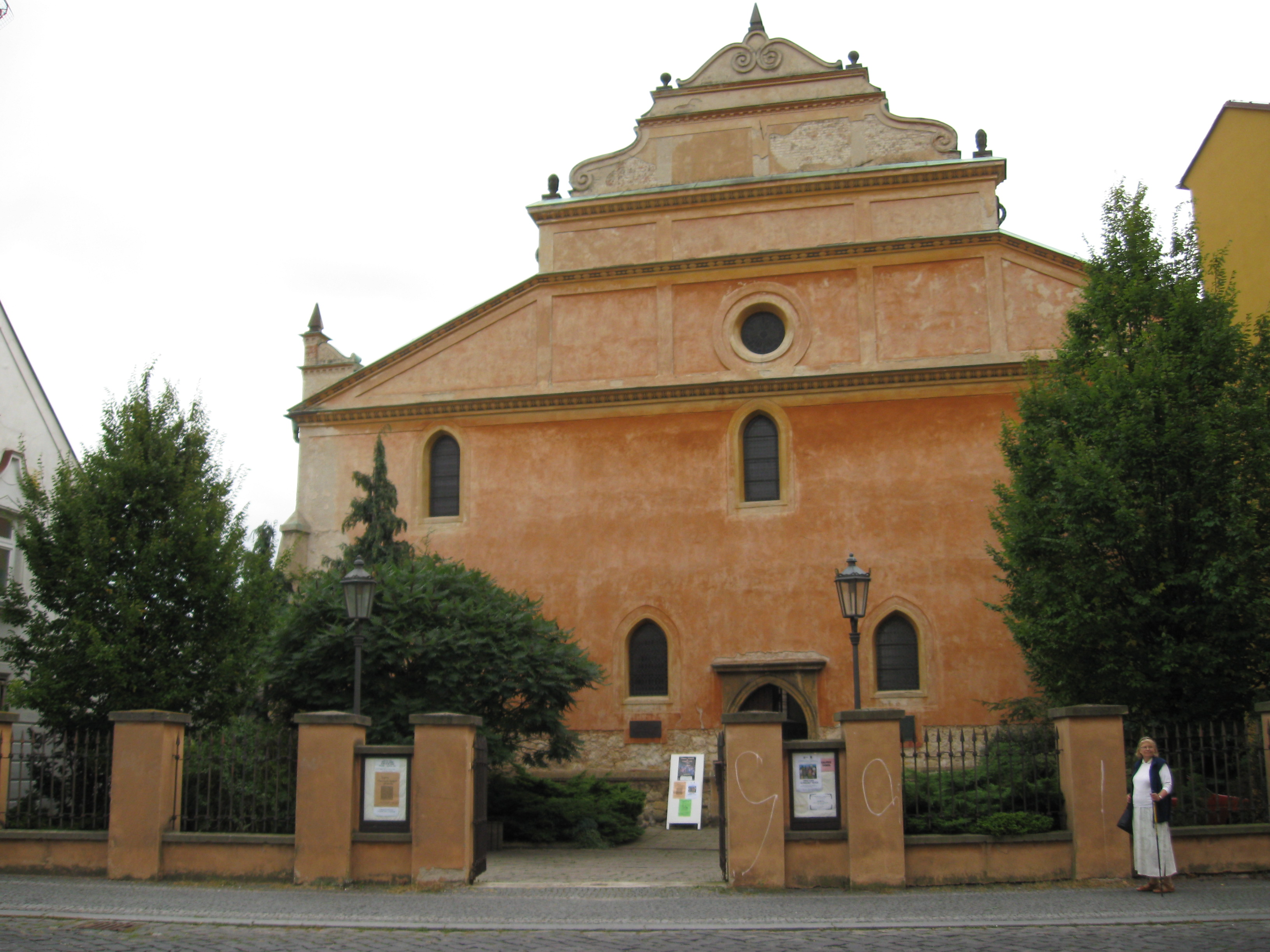
Church of the Bohemian Brethren in Mladá Boleslav

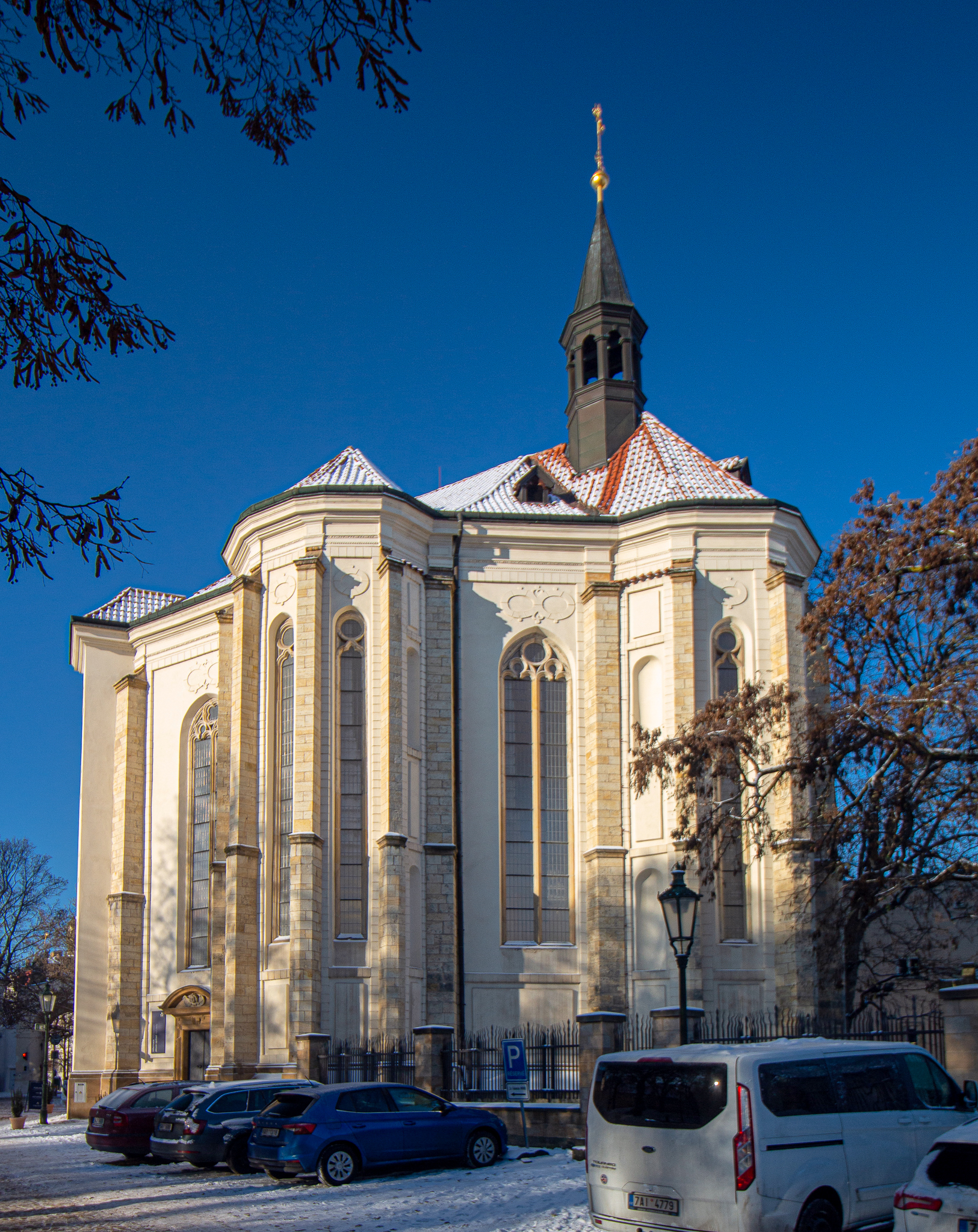
Church of Saint Rochus in Prague

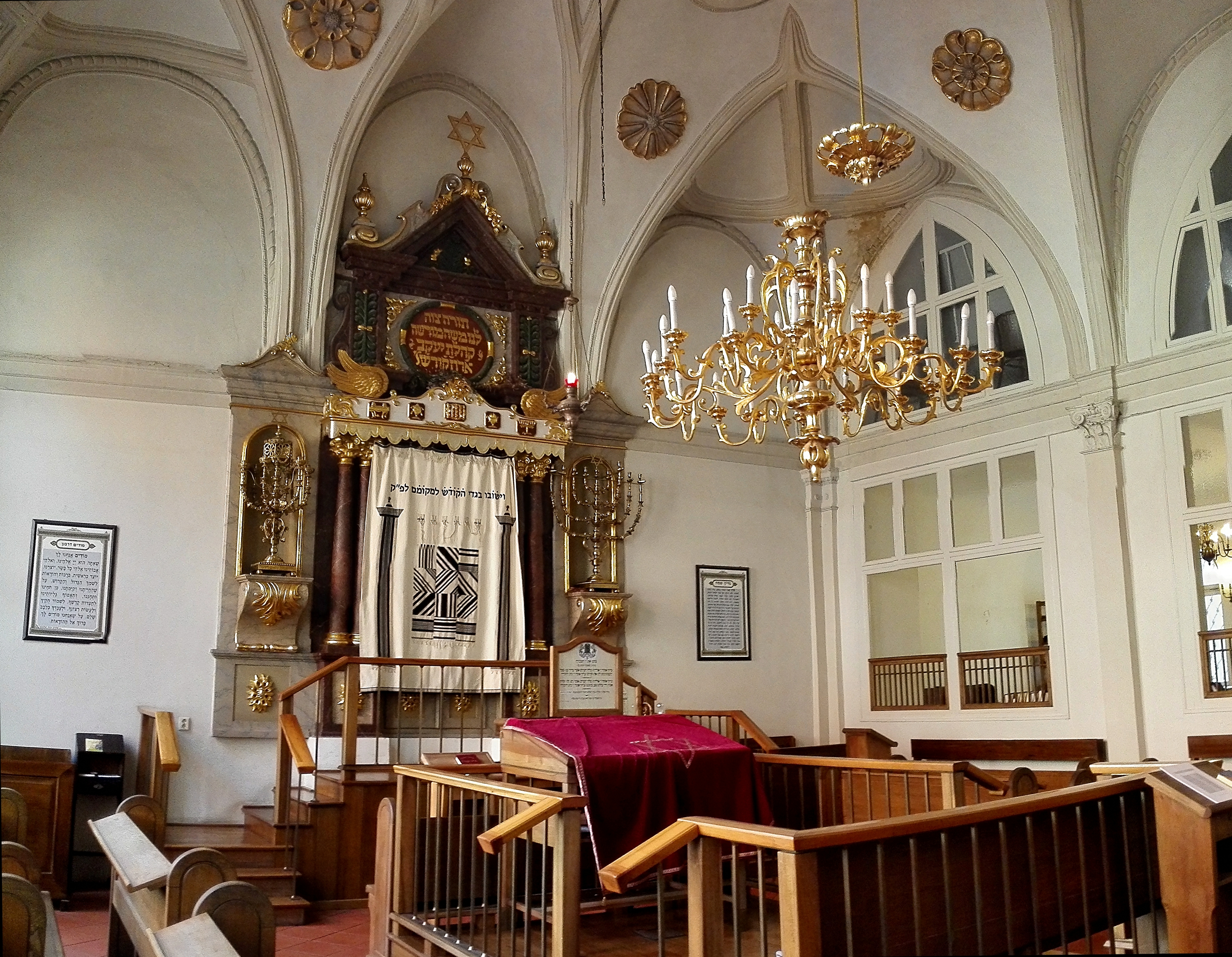
Interior of High Synagogue in Prague

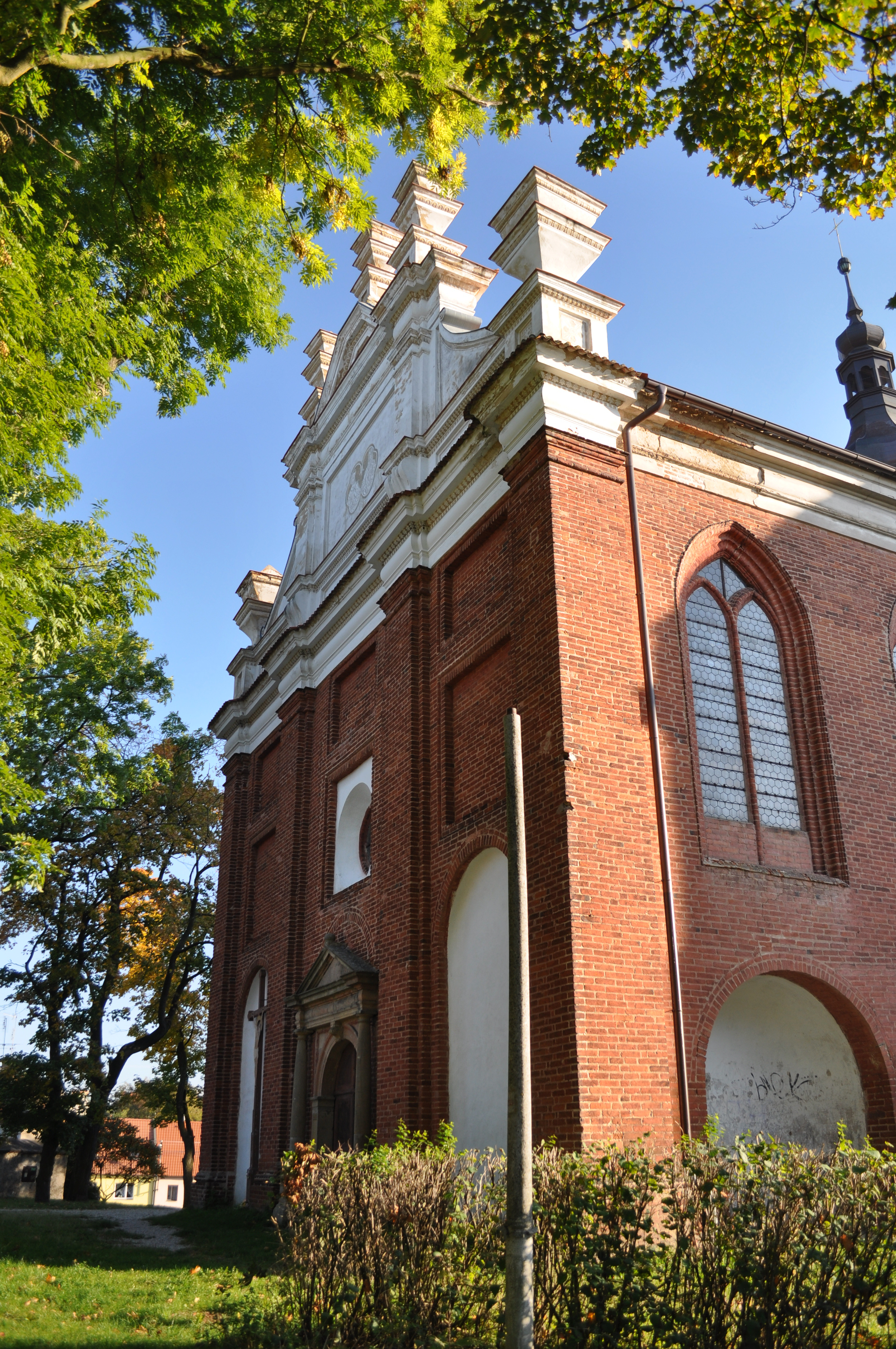
Church of Saints Peter and Paul in Kralovice

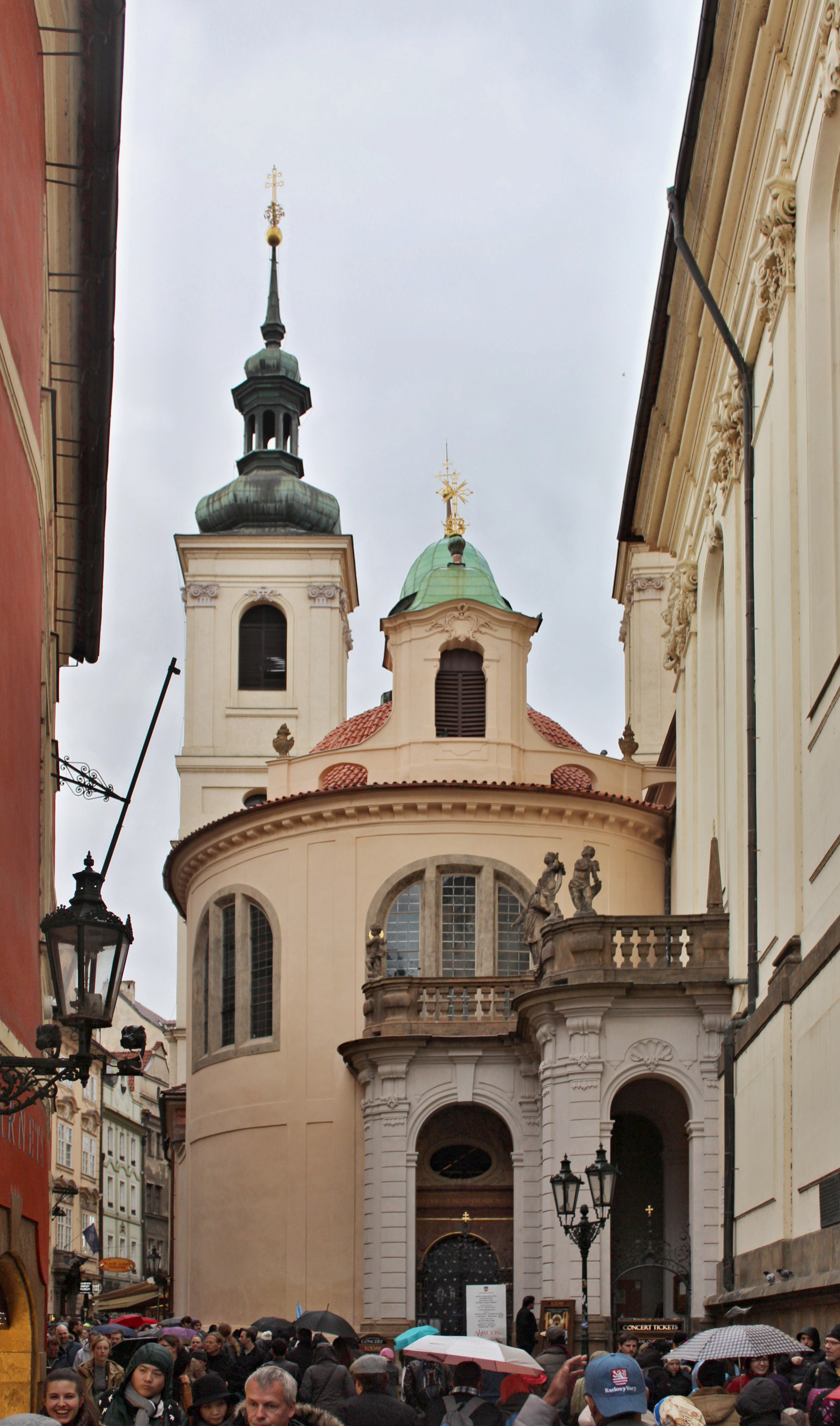
Italian Chapel in Clementinum from the 1590s

During the 16th century three new synagogues were built in Prague. The oldest parts of the Pinkas Synagogue contain late Gothic elements (rib vaulting, tracery). The Maisel Synagogue lost its Renaissance appearance but the High Synagogue has been very well preserved. Behind its very plain facade with three windows, there is a very valuable Renaissance interior.

The Italian Chapel consecrated to the Assumption of Mary, adjoining the former Jesuit college called Clementinum built in 1590–1600 for Italians residing in Prague, designed by the Italian architect O. Mascarino, is very important for the development of sacred architecture in Bohemia because it is one of the first Czech religious buildings which does not use any Gothic elements. It has an elliptical ground plan, therefore it is even sometimes considered one of the earliest Baroque architectural forms in Bohemia.

== See also ==
- Renaissance architecture
- Czech Gothic architecture
- Czech Baroque architecture
