= Old Royal Palace (Prague) =

Part of Prague Castle, Czechia

Coordinates: 50°5′25.54″N 14°24′5.23″E

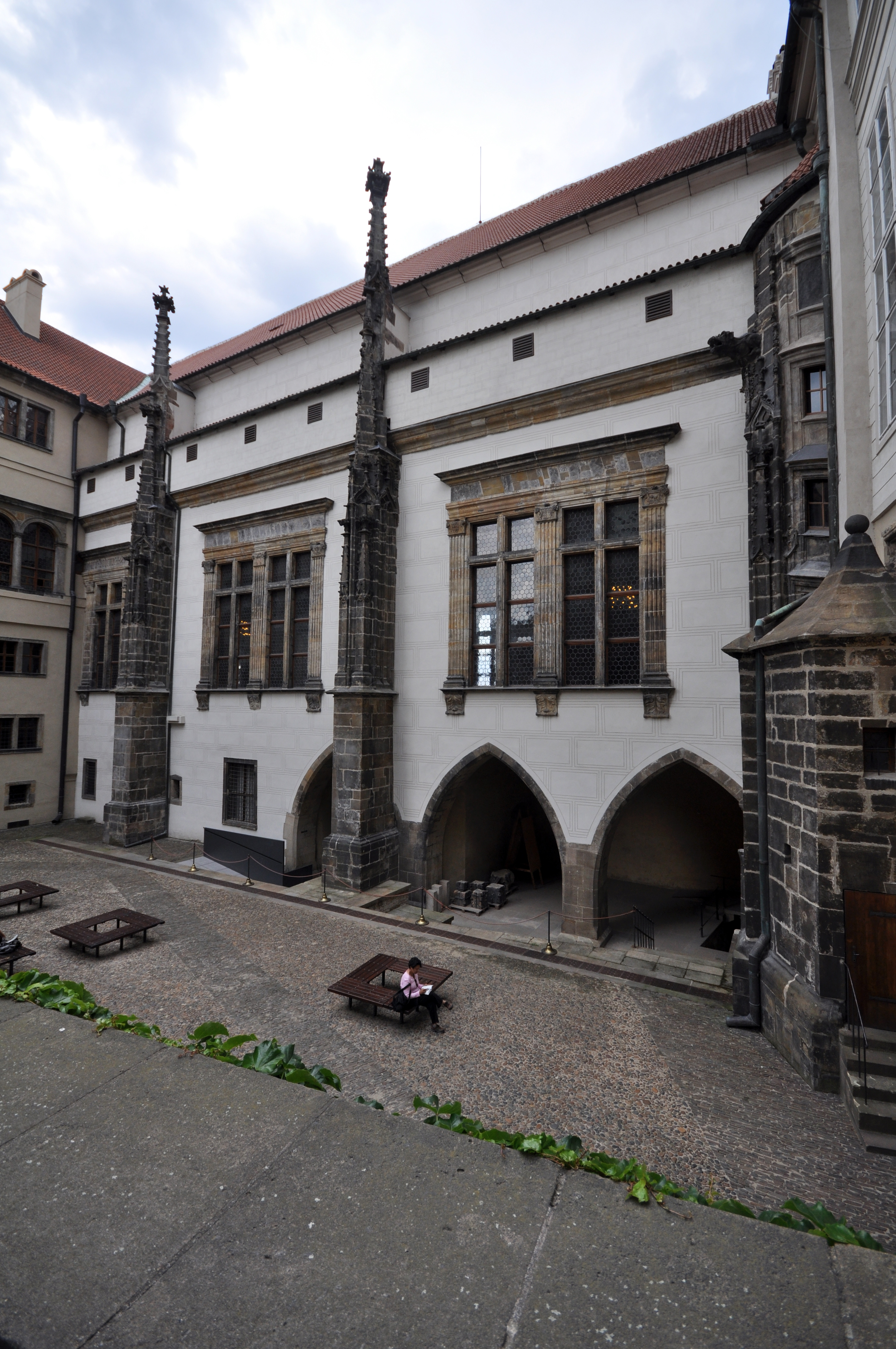
Exterior of Vladislav Hall of the Old Royal Palace, Prague

The Old Royal Palace (Czech: Starý královský palác) is part of the Prague Castle, Prague, Czech Republic. Its Vladislav Hall is used for inaugurations, being the most important representative hall in the country. It is also home to a copy of the Czech crown.

== History ==
The Old Royal Palace dates back to the 12th century and it is designed in the Gothic and Renaissance styles. After a major fire in 1541, Ferdinand I, Holy Roman Emperor had the Old Royal Palace renovated so an assembly could be held in Prague as planned.

== Bibliography ==
Uličný, Petr (2015). "The Palace of Queen Anne Jagiello and Archduke Ferdinand II of Tyrol by the White Tower in Prague Castle". Historie – Otázky – Problémy. 7 (2): 142–161.
