= Rudník (Trutnov District) =

- Municipality
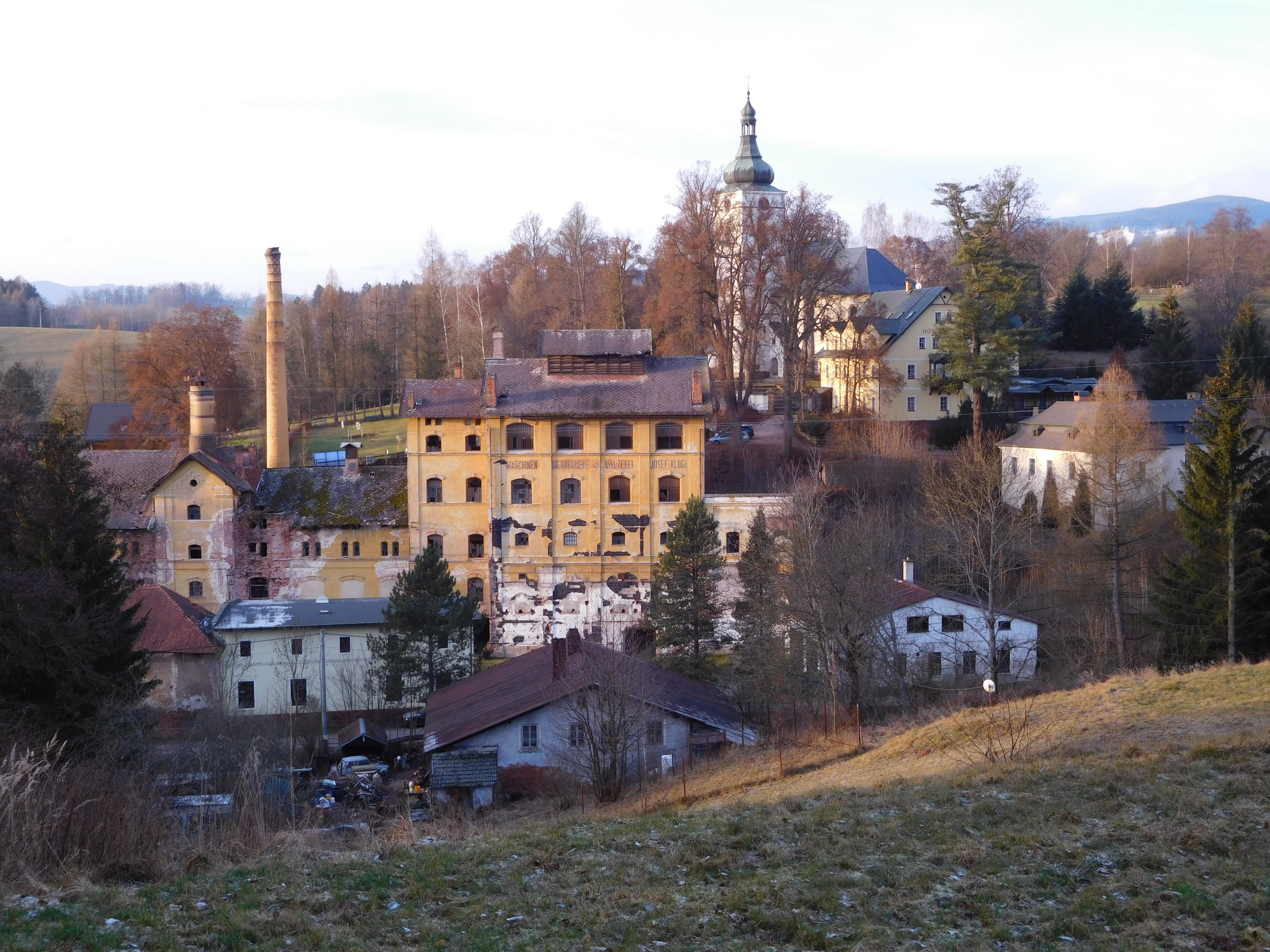
- View towards the church and former brewery

- Flag Coat of arms

- Location in the Czech Republic
- Coordinates: 50°35′29″N 15°44′0″E
- Country: Czech Republic
- Region: Hradec Králové
- District: Trutnov
- First mentioned: 1354

Area
  - Total: 42.67 km^{2} (16.47 sq mi)
- Elevation: 411 m (1,348 ft)

Population (2026-01-01)
  - Total: 1,993
  - Density: 46.71/km^{2} (121.0/sq mi)
- Time zone: UTC+1 (CET)
  - Summer (DST): UTC+2 (CEST)
- Postal code: 543 72
- Website: www.rudnik.cz

Rudník (until 1952 Heřmanovy Sejfy; German: Hermannseifen) is a municipality and village in Trutnov District in the Hradec Králové Region of the Czech Republic. It has about 2,000 inhabitants.

== Administrative division ==
Rudník consists of three municipal parts (in brackets population according to the 2021 census):

- Rudník (1,597)
- Arnultovice (288)
- Javorník (126)

== Etymology ==
The initial German name of Rudník was Hermannseifen ("Hermann's seifen"), which was transcribed into Czech as Heřmanovy Sejfy. In mining terminology, the word seifen was used for layered mineral deposits (sand, clay, pebbles), washed into a narrow valley by watercourses, where precious metals were extracted from them (especially gold, silver and tin). Seifen was originally the name of a local stream, transferred to the settlement. The modern name Rudník has its root in the Czech word ruda ('ore').

== Geography ==
Rudník is located about 12 kilometres (7 mi) west of Trutnov and 41 km (25 mi) north of Hradec Králové. It lies in the Giant Mountains Foothills. The highest point is the hill Smrčina at 687 m (2,254 ft) above sea level. The village is situated at the confluence of the streams Luční potok and Bolkovský potok.

== History ==
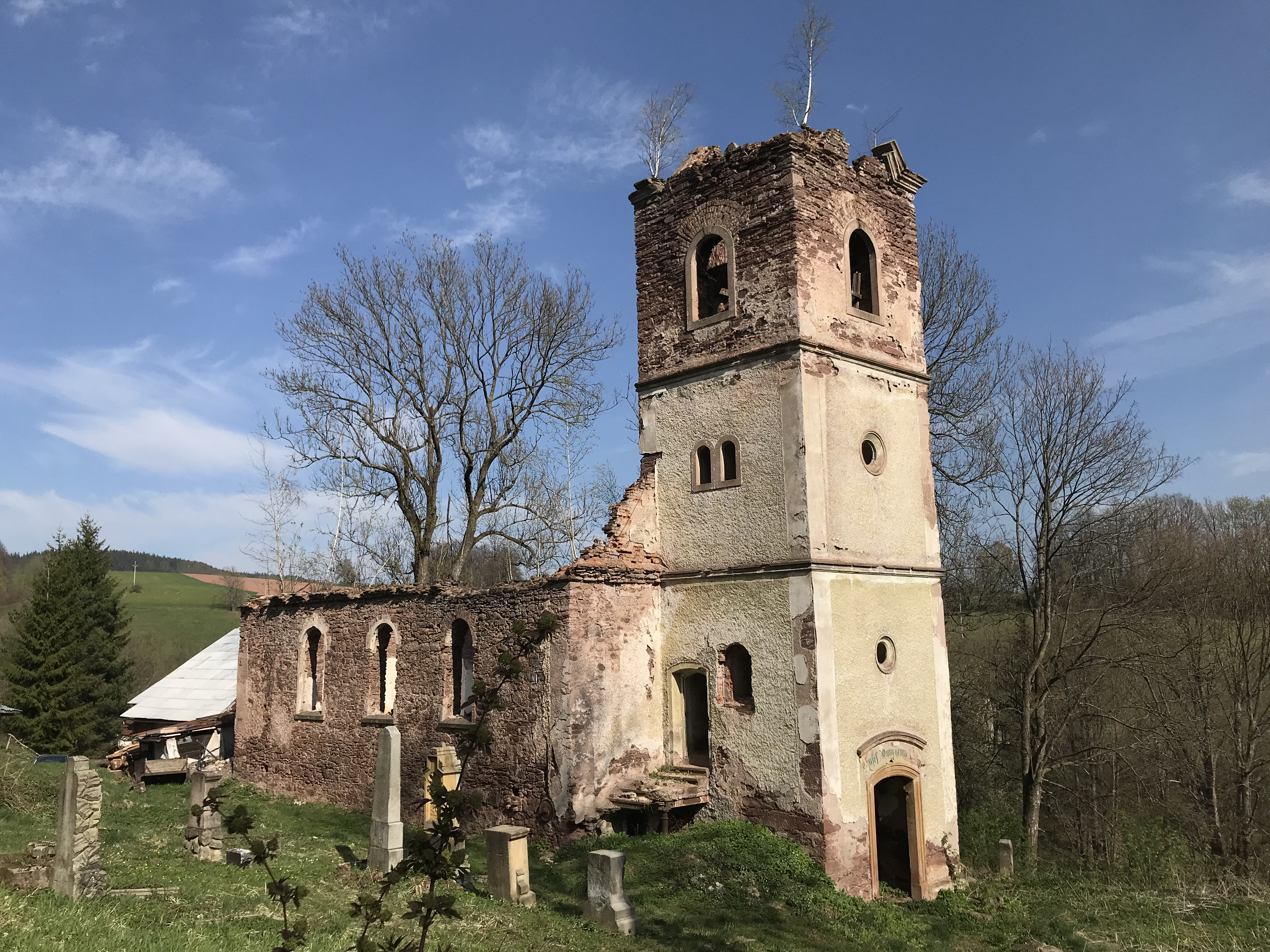
Former evangelical church

The first written mention of Rudník is from 1354, that time known as Heřmanovy Sejfy. It was founded during the colonisation of the Giant Mountains in the 13th century by German immigrants who mined ore here. The most notable owners of the village were the Waldstein family, who held it from 1521 to 1706. They further developed the mining and processing of ores, and contributed to the building development of the village.

The next owners were a branch of the Schwarzenberg family, who merged it with the Vlčice estate. In 1790, the estate was bought by the Barons Theers of Silberstein, who had the castle and stone school building built in the village. They sold the village to the Kluge family in 1880. The Kluges established here a bleaching plant, a dyeing plant and a mechanical weaving plant.

Thanks to a sulphur-containing mineral spring, spa gradually developed in a part called Lázně Fořt. The spa came to an end in 1920s due to the establishment of a chemical factory nearby.

== Demographics ==
Historical population

Year	Pop.	±%
1869	4,418	—
1880	4,540	+2.8%
1890	4,488	−1.1%
1900	4,367	−2.7%
1910	4,253	−2.6%

Year	Pop.	±%
1921	3,820	−10.2%
1930	4,159	+8.9%
1950	2,904	−30.2%
1961	2,868	−1.2%
1970	2,714	−5.4%

Year	Pop.	±%
1980	2,438	−10.2%
1991	2,164	−11.2%
2001	2,187	+1.1%
2011	2,141	−2.1%
2021	2,011	−6.1%

Source: Censuses

== Transport ==
The I/14 road (the section from Liberec to Trutnov) runs through the municipality.

== Sights ==
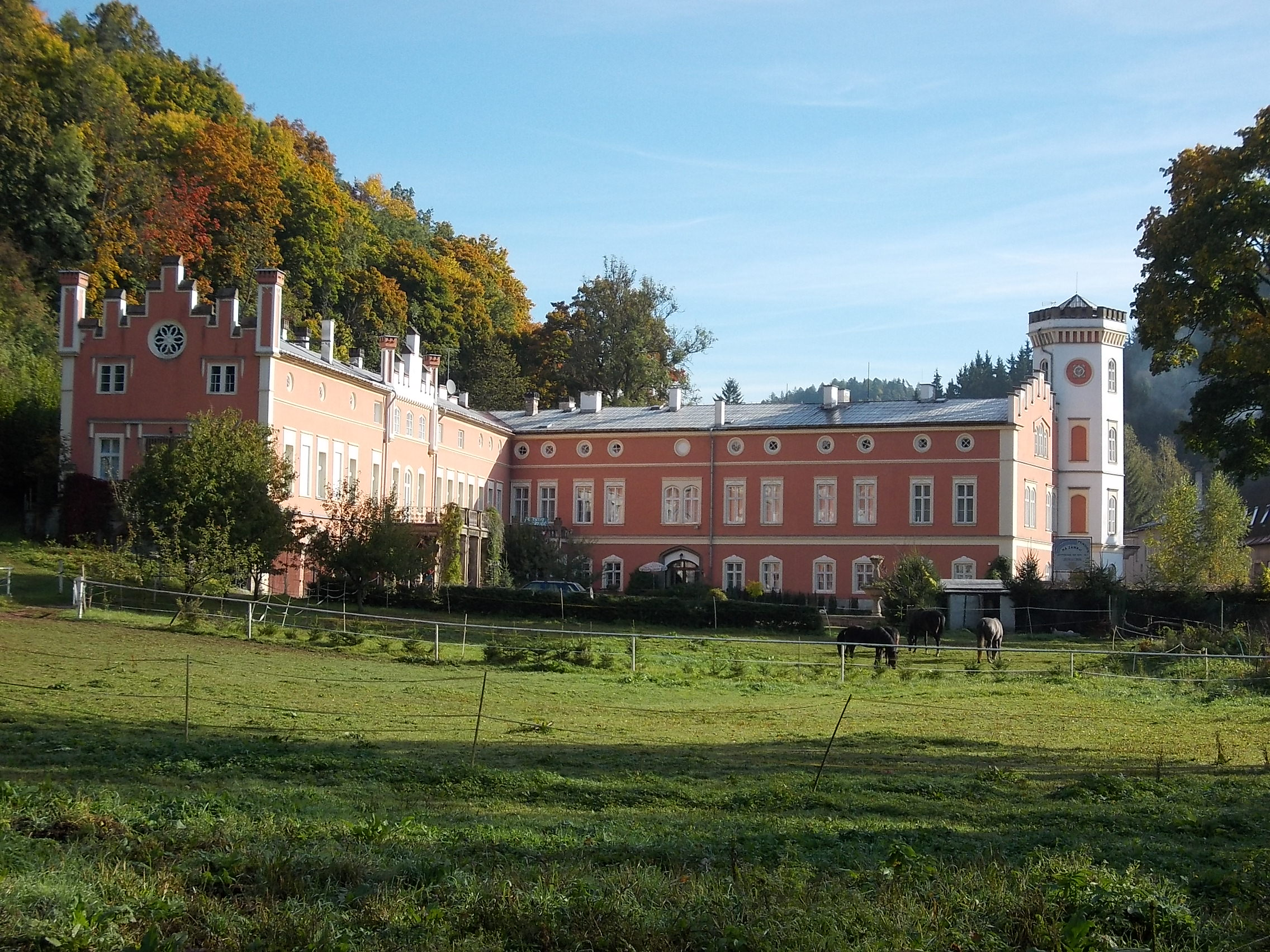
Rudník Castle

The most valuable historical building of Rudník is the Church of Saint Wenceslaus. It was built in the Gothic style in the mid-14th century. In 1598–1602, it was rebuilt in the Renaissance style, but the late Gothic tower has been preserved.

The Rudník Castle, also called Silbersteins' Castle, was built for Josef Karel Theer of Silberstein in the 1830s. In 1858, it was rebuilt in the neo-Gothic style. Today it serves as a hotel.

The Church of Saint Martin is located in Javorník. It is a rural Baroque church. It was built in 1707–1708 on the site of an older church from the 14th century.

== Gallery ==
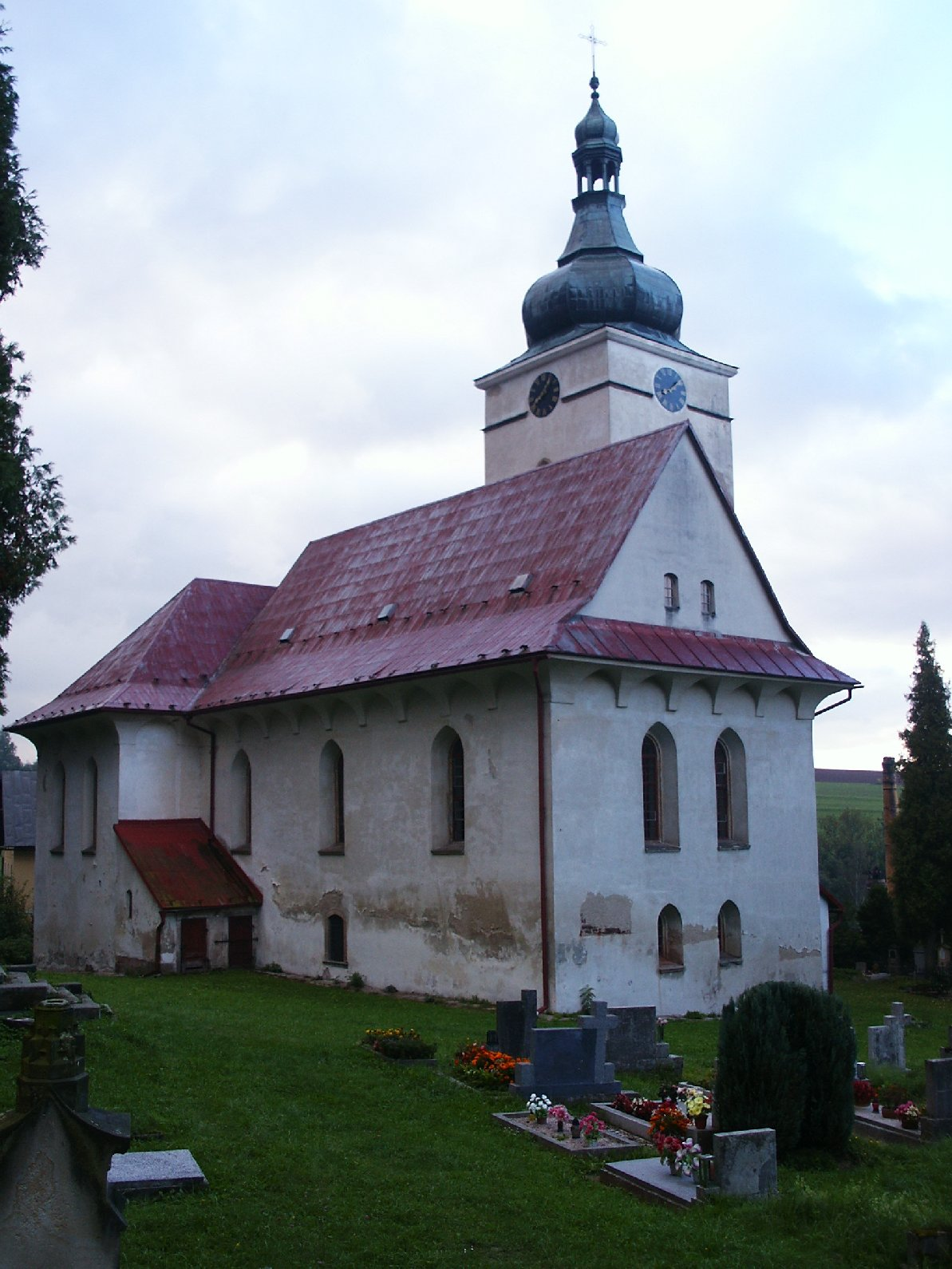
Church of Saint Wenceslaus

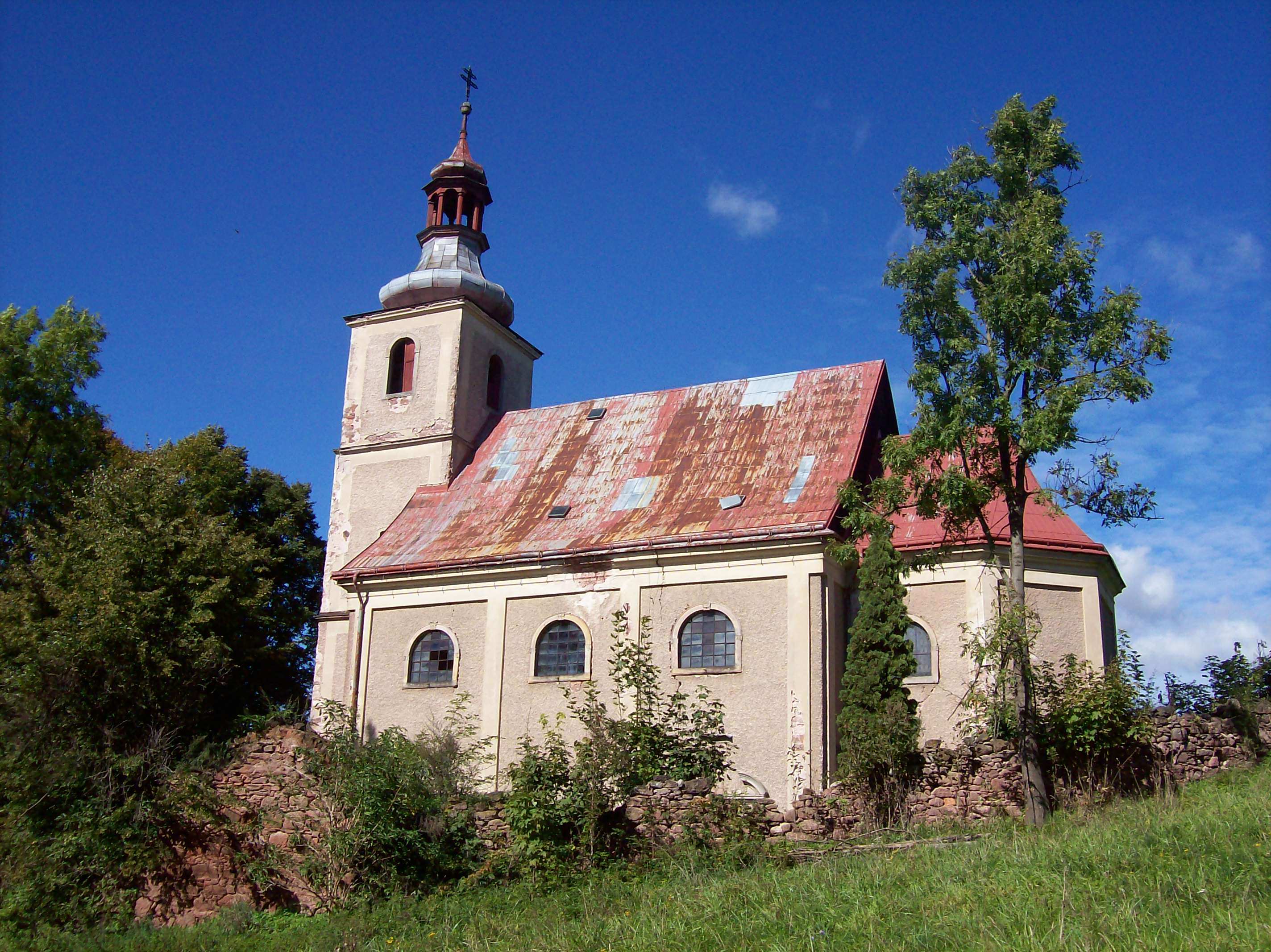
Church of Saint Martin

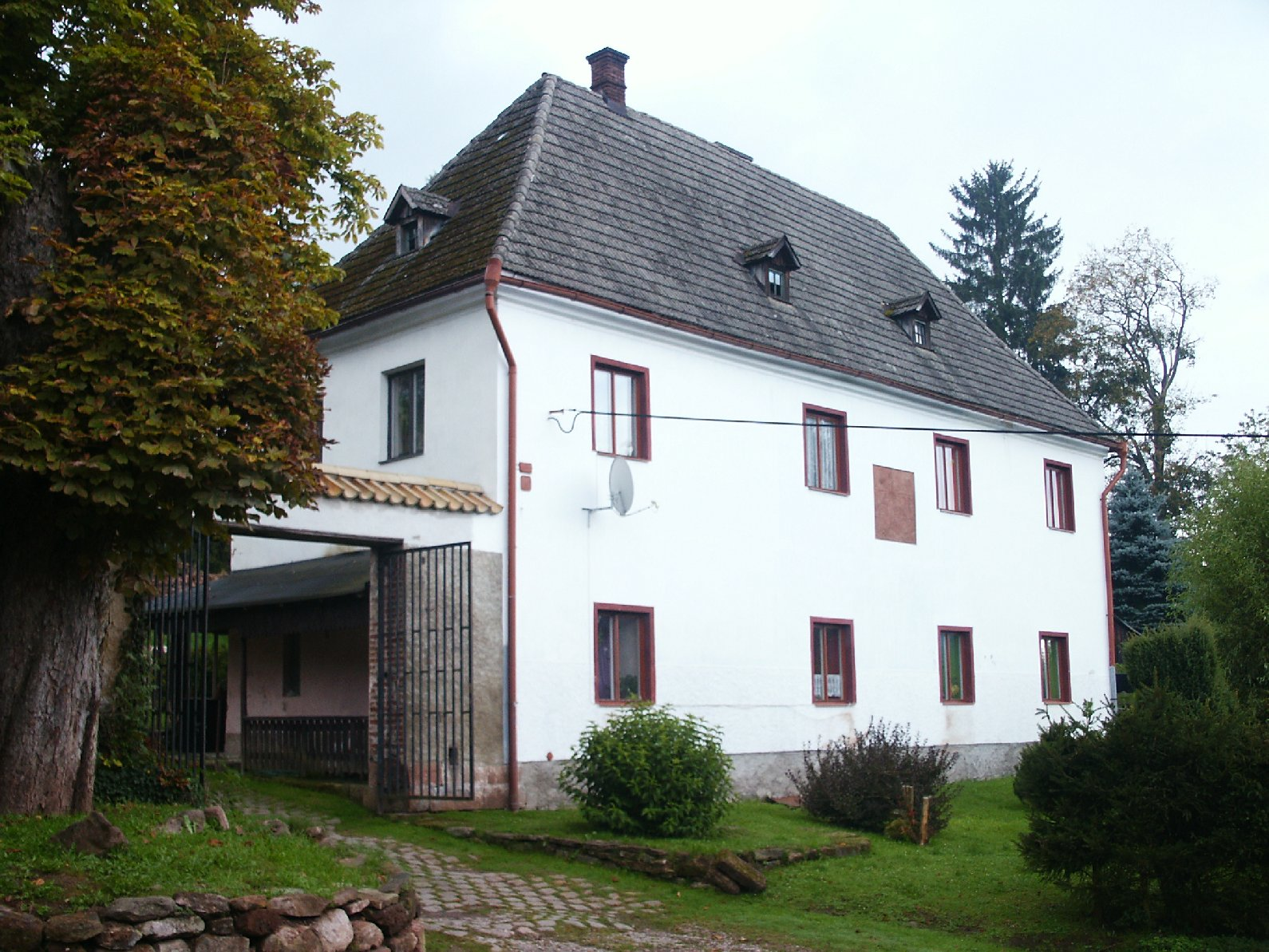
Former Vogt's residence
