= Church of the Nativity, Opočno =

Roman Catholic church in the Czech Republic

Coordinates: 50.2676°N 16.1160°E

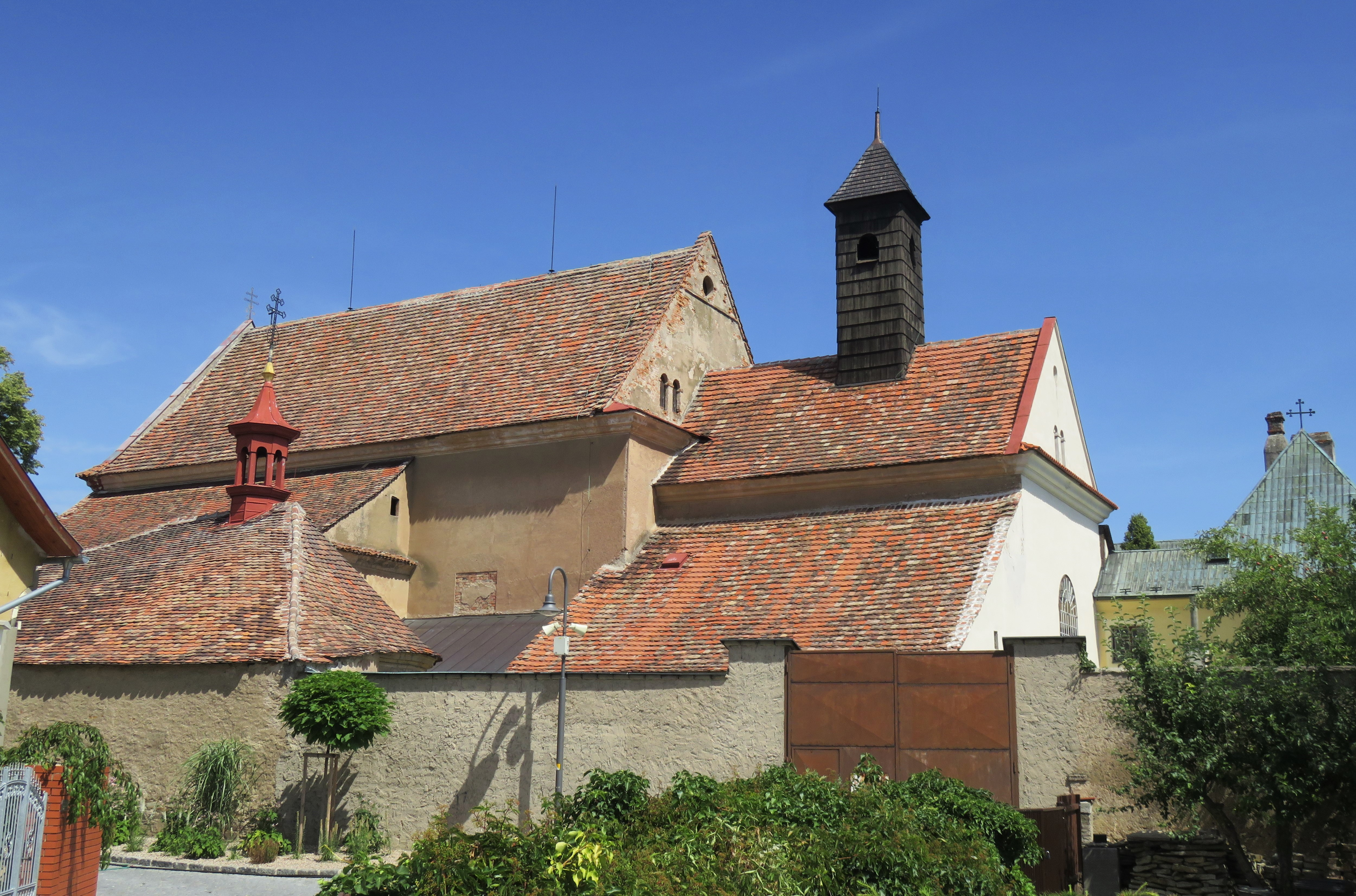
View of the church and the conventual buildings from the north

Ringing of the church bells (1941)

The Church of the Nativity (Czech: Kostel Narození Páně) is a Roman Catholic church in Opočno in the Hradec Králové Region of the Czech Republic. It is located on Kupkovo Square. Built in the 17th century, it was used until 1950 as a conventual church of the Capuchin Convent of Opočno. Today, it is one of the two active Catholic churches in Opočno, together with the parish Church of the Holy Trinity near Opočno Castle.

== History ==
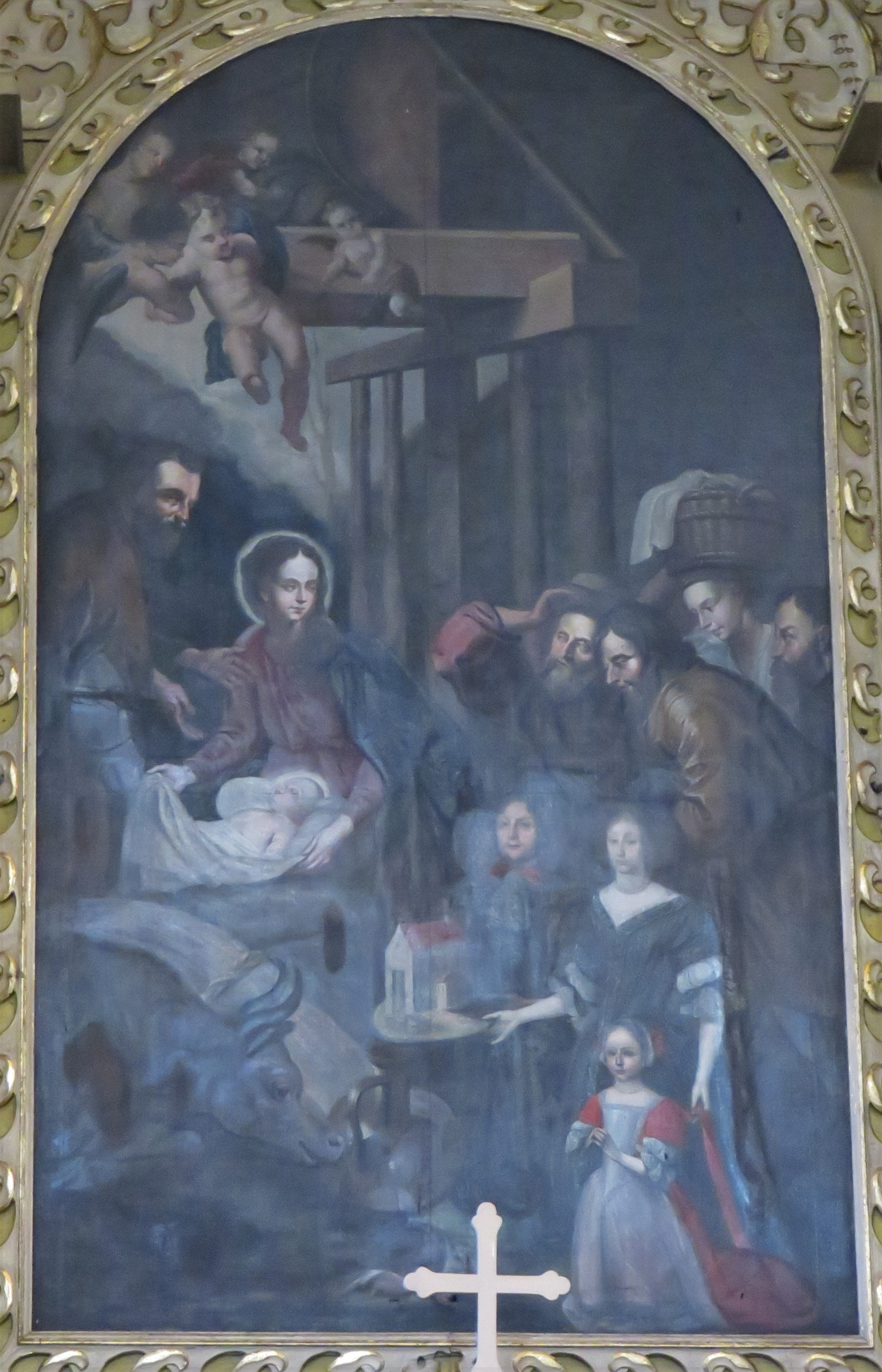
Altarpiece of the Nativity of Christ with the family of the founder of the Capuchin convent in Opočno

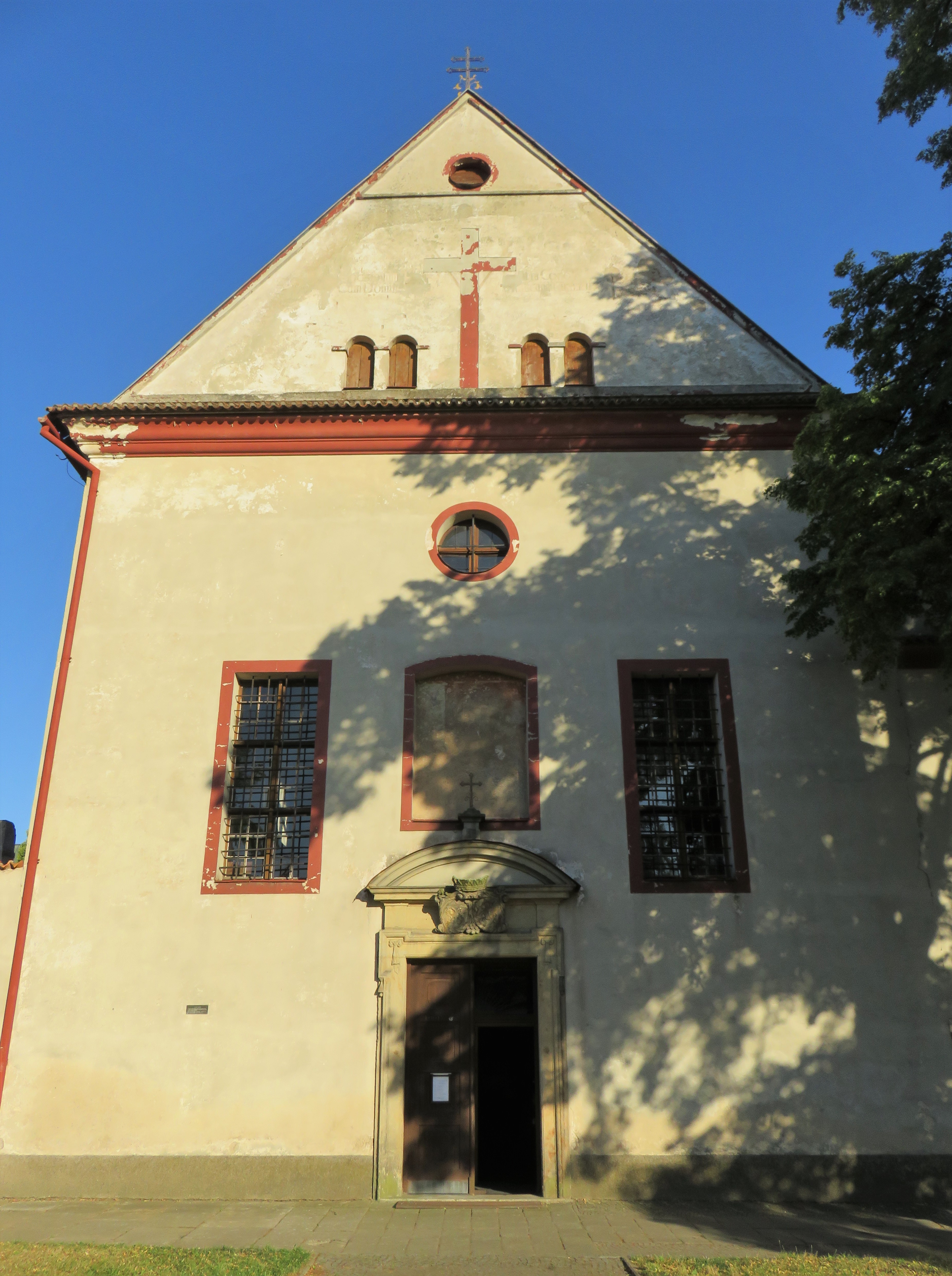
Front facade of the church

The Capuchins decided to establish a new convent in Opočno in 1673. The Capuchin provincial superior Martinus Freibergensis therefore asked the owner of Opočno dominion for his support. Count Louis Colloredo of Waldsee and his wife Maria Eleonora of Sinzendorfu regarded this idea with favour and already on 30 June 1674 the foundation stone of the new building was laid. The church situated in the north-east part of the newly established square was built between 1676 and 1678 by Capuchin architect Bruno from České Budějovice and Italian builder Bernardo Minelli. First Capuchins came to Opočno on 23 May 1677, but the church was completed the following year. The Capuchins were supposed to strengthen the Catholic faith among the still predominantly Protestant inhabitants of Opočno dominion.

In 1733 the convent burnt down together with the adjoining church. The restoration was finished already in 1735, again with support of the Colloredo family. Most of the church furnishings date back to this time.

During World War I, the convent accommodated refugees from Galicia and Bukovina. After World War II, the Capuchins ran an orphanage. In 1950 the Capuchin convent was dissolved by the Communist police and confiscated by the Czechoslovak state and the church started to belong to the local parish.

== Description ==
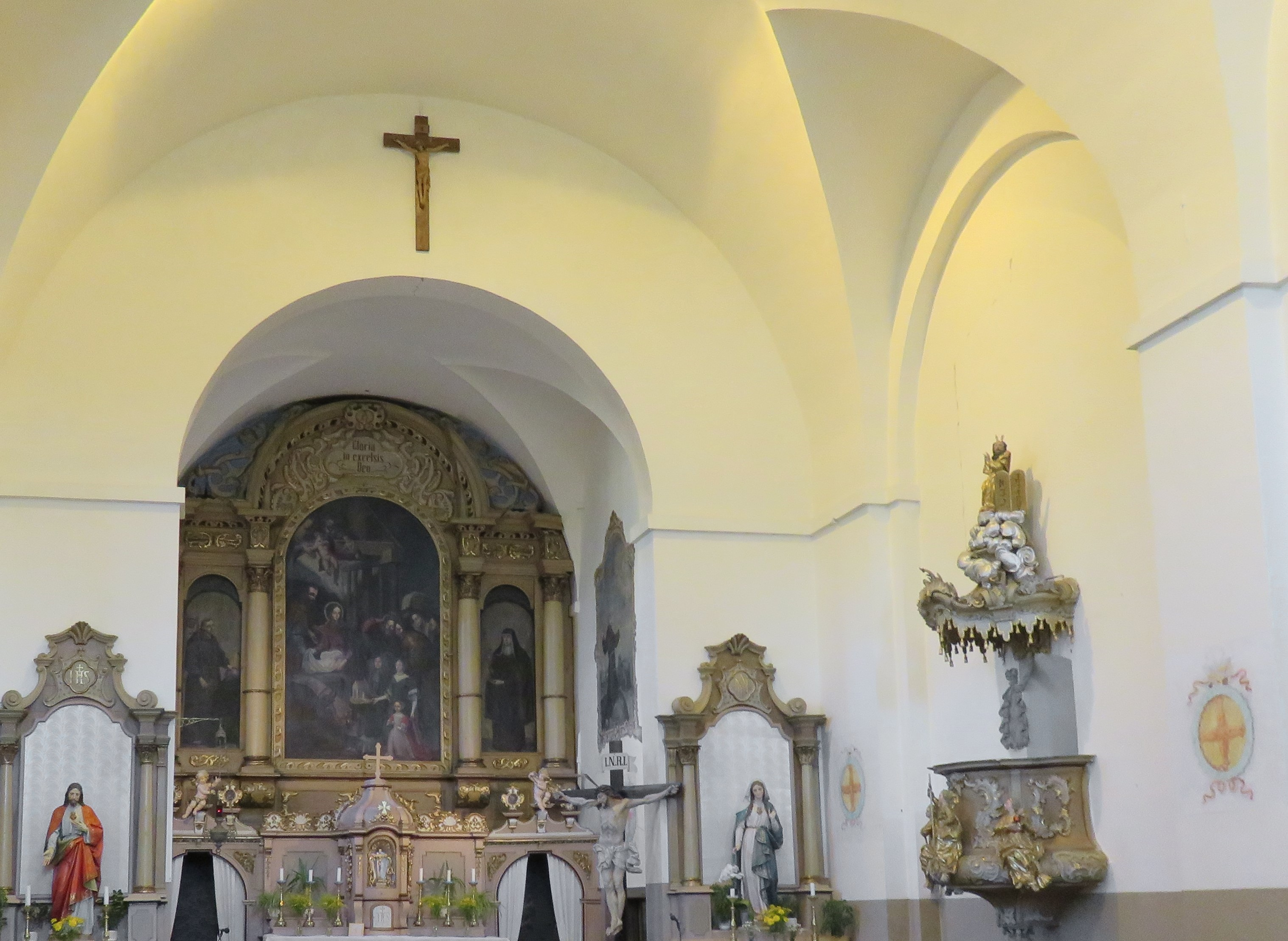
Interior

The church is a very simple structure, typical for the Capuchin order. The conventual buildings adjoin the church from the north side.

=== Interior ===
The main altarpiece from the first half of the 18th century represents the birth of Jesus Christ in Bethlehem. In the lower-right corner there is the portrait of the founder Count Louis Colloredo holding a model of the church, his wife Maria Eleonora and their daughter Maria Antonia. The wooden pulpit was also made the first half of the 18th century. On the top there is a statue of Moses.

The ambon and communion table was made in 1979 by Václav Hartman, parish priest in Hronov.
