= Opočno =

- Town
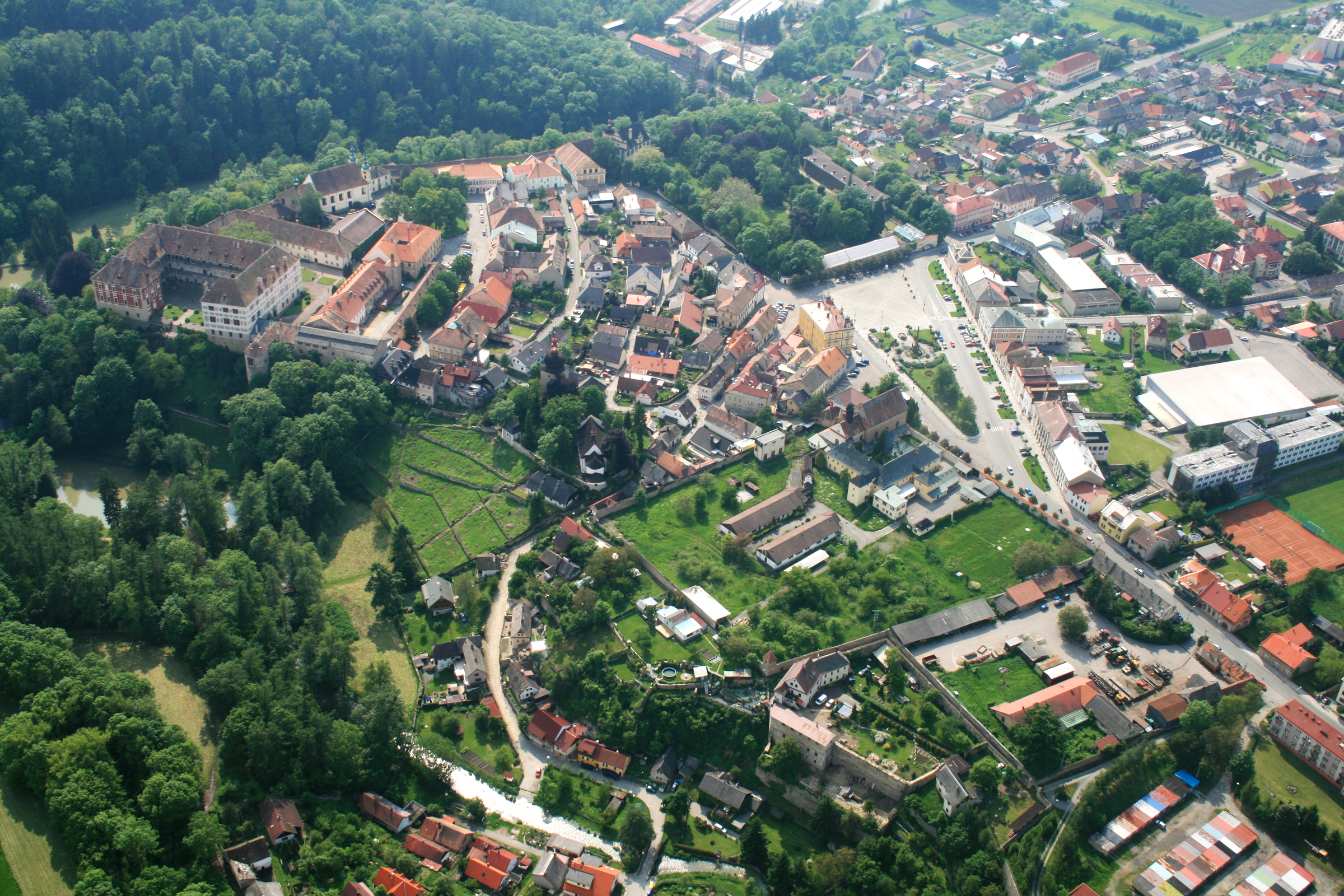
- Aerial view of Opočno

- Flag Coat of arms

- Location in the Czech Republic
- Coordinates: 50°16′3″N 16°6′54″E
- Country: Czech Republic
- Region: Hradec Králové
- District: Rychnov nad Kněžnou
- First mentioned: 1068

Government
  - Mayor: Šárka Škrabalová

Area
  - Total: 14.01 km^{2} (5.41 sq mi)
- Elevation: 292 m (958 ft)

Population (2026-01-01)
  - Total: 3,118
  - Density: 222.6/km^{2} (576.4/sq mi)
- Time zone: UTC+1 (CET)
  - Summer (DST): UTC+2 (CEST)
- Postal code: 517 73
- Website: www.mestoopocno.cz

Opočno (Czech pronunciation: [ˈopotʃno]; German: Opotschno) is a town in Rychnov nad Kněžnou District in the Hradec Králové Region of the Czech Republic. It has about 3,100 inhabitants. The town is located on the Dědina River.

Opočno is known for the Opočno Castle, one of the most magnificent examples of Renaissance architecture in Bohemia. The historic town centre with the castle is well preserved and is protected as an urban monument zone.

== Administrative division ==
Opočno consists of three municipal parts (in brackets population according to the 2021 census):

- Opočno (2,822)
- Čánka (241)
- Dobříkovec (42)

== Etymology ==
The name is derived from the Old Czech adjective opočný, meaning 'stone' or 'rock' (castle).

== Geography ==
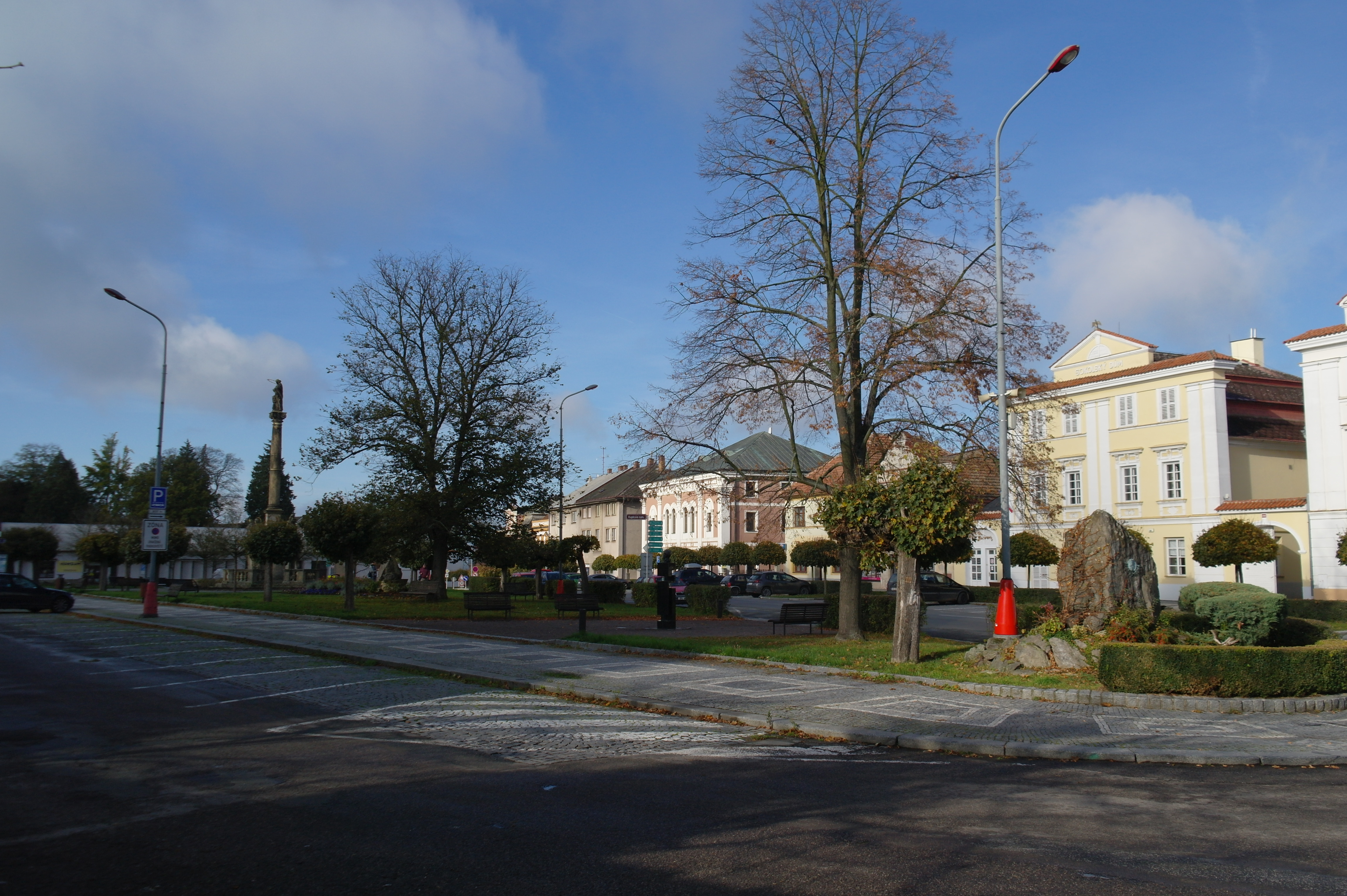
The square Kupkovo náměstí

Opočno is located about 20 kilometres (12 mi) northeast of Hradec Králové. It lies in the Orlice Table. The highest point is the Velká Hvězda hill at 355 m (1,165 ft) above sea level. The town is situated on the Dědina River (here also called Zlatý potok) and on the shore of the fishpond Broumar.

== History ==
Opočno was first mentioned in 1068 by Cosmas of Prague in his Chronica Boemorum, when there was a gord. In the early 14th century, Opočno was acquired by the Drslavic family, who had a Gothic castle built here, and a small town began to arise next to it.

In 1495, the Bohemian noble family of Trčka of Lípa became owners of Opočno. During their rule, Opočno enjoyed a period of a significant economic growth and the castle was rebuilt. After the extinction of the Trčka family, Opočno was acquired by the Colloredo family. In 1673, a Capuchin monastery was founded in Opočno.

In the 19th century, further development occurred. The district court and a hospital were established. The industrialisation began with establishment of factories producing farm machinery and dairy products. This led to growth of the population.

During World War II, in 1942, the property of the Colloredo-Mandsfeld family including the castle in Opočno was confiscated by the Nazis. The restitution claims of the Colloredo-Mansfeld between 1991 and 2017 were denied.

== Demographics ==
Historical population

Year	Pop.	±%
1869	2,355	—
1880	2,658	+12.9%
1890	2,711	+2.0%
1900	2,799	+3.2%
1910	3,070	+9.7%

Year	Pop.	±%
1921	3,057	−0.4%
1930	2,869	−6.1%
1950	2,874	+0.2%
1961	3,003	+4.5%
1970	3,183	+6.0%

Year	Pop.	±%
1980	3,403	+6.9%
1991	3,309	−2.8%
2001	3,138	−5.2%
2011	3,070	−2.2%
2021	3,105	+1.1%

Source: Censuses

== Economy ==
The main employer based in Opočno is Bohemilk, a producer of fresh milk and dairy products with more than 250 employees.

== Transport ==
Opočno is located on the railway line Náchod–Choceň.

== Sights ==
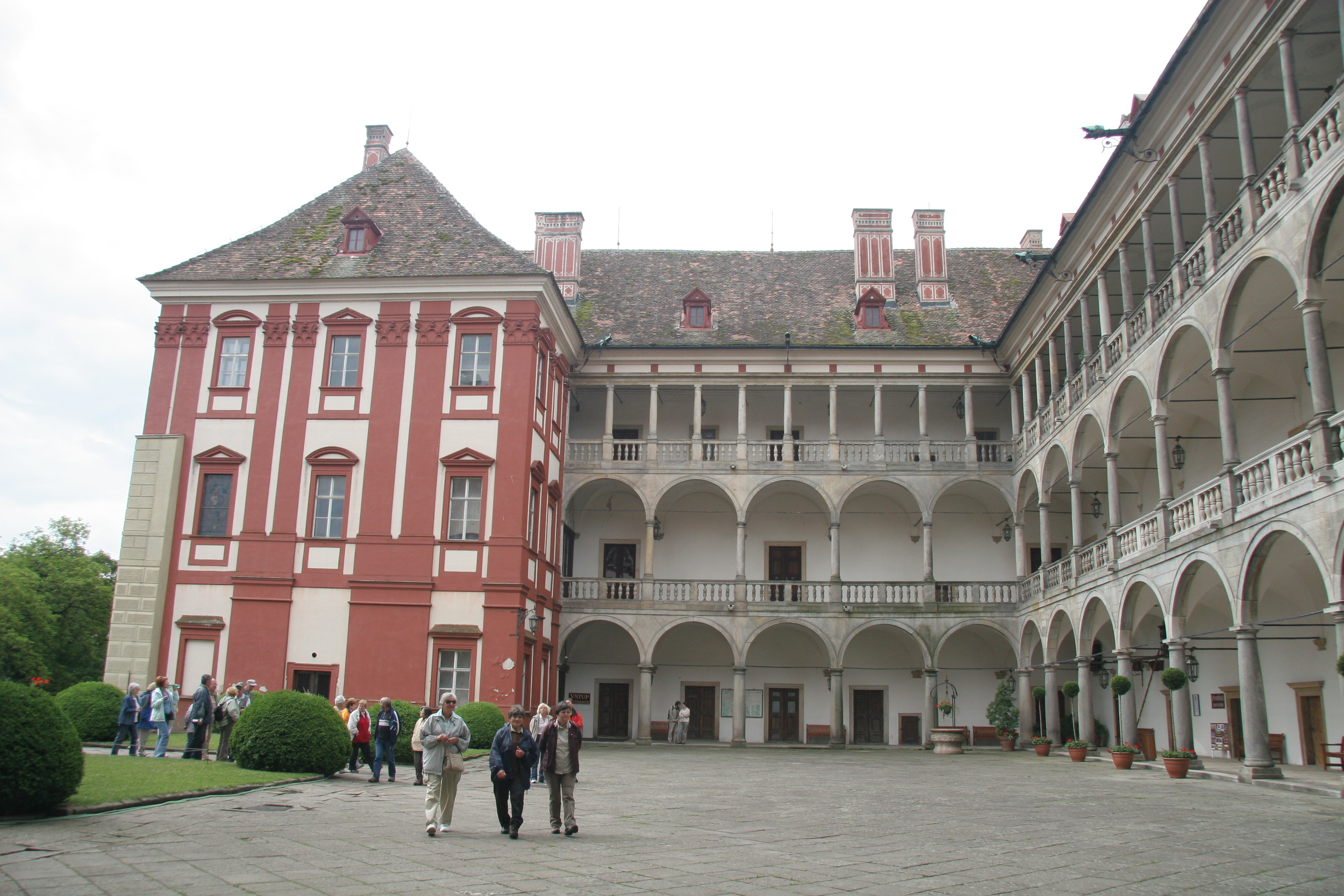
Opočno Castle

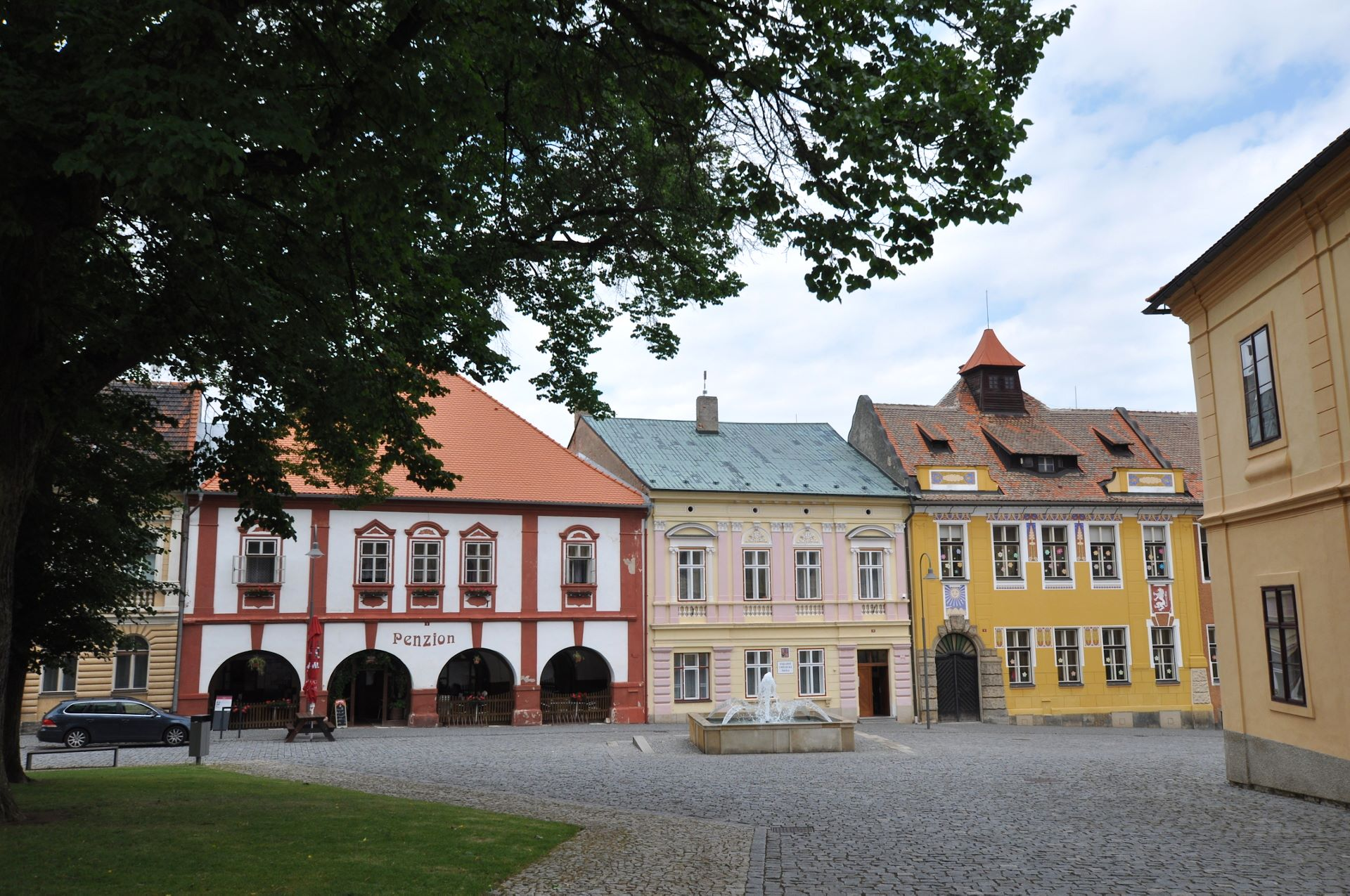
Trčkovo náměstí

The main sight is Opočno Castle. In 1560–1569, it was rebuilt in the Renaissance style, and after a fire in the late 17th century, Baroque modifications were made. Its part is an English park with an area of 19.5 hectares (48 acres). In the castle park there is the French-style castle summer house from 1602.

There are three churches in Opočno. The parish Church of the Holy Trinity is located in the castle complex. It was built in the Renaissance style in 1567 and rebuilt in the Baroque style in the first half of the 18th century. The Church of the Nativity of Jesus was originally a convent church of the Capuchin monastery, built in 1673. The monastery complex with the church is a unique complex of early Baroque buildings. The third church is the Church of the Virgin Mary in the old cemetery. The old church from the 17th century was rebuilt in 1810 to its current appearance. It now serves as a concert hall.

The historic centre of Opočno is formed by squares Kupkovo náměstí and Trčkovo náměstí with adjacent streets, and by the castle complex. On Trčkovo náměstí, there are valuable Renaissance and Baroque burgher houses.

== Notable people ==
- František Zdeněk Skuherský (1830–1892), composer
- František Kupka (1871–1957), painter
- Naděžda Kavalírová (1923–2017), human rights activist and political prisoner
- Luboš Sluka (born 1928), composer
- Ivo Ulich (born 1974), footballer
- Jaroslav Plašil (born 1982), footballer
- Taťána Kuchařová (born 1987), model and beauty pageant titleholder

== Twin towns – sister cities ==
Opočno is twinned with:

- Opoczno, Poland
- Puteaux, France
- Radków, Poland
