= František Zdeněk Skuherský =

Czech composer, pedagogue, and theoretician

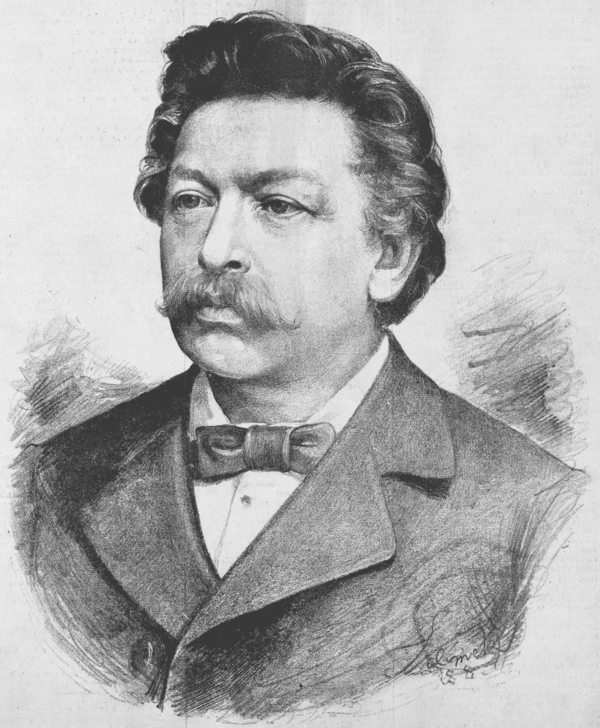
František Zdeněk Skuherský

František Zdeněk Xavier Alois Skuherský (July 31, 1830 – August 19, 1892) was a Czech composer, pedagogue, and theoretician.

Born in Opočno to František Alois Skuherský, the doctor of Duke Colloredo-Mansfeld and founder of the Opočno hospital. He graduated from the Hradec Králové gymnasium and studied philosophy and shortly medicine at Charles University. Also in Prague, he graduated from an organ school. In music, especially composing, he paid attention since childhood. He signed his first works in the pseudonym Opocensky. After his studies, he made a living by teaching people music in their homes. In the years 1854 to 1866 he was a theatre kapellmeister in Innsbruck and conductor of the town's singing choir, and later director of the University's cathedral. During this time he composed six operas, some of which premiered at Innsbruck. After the death of his wife, who gave him three children, he came back to Prague where in 1866 he became the director of a prominent organ school until he retired in 1890. This school was attended by such famous composers as Leoš Janáček and Josef Bohuslav Foerster. At the same time he worked as a regenschori at a Prague cathedral, a teacher of music theory at a Czech University, and continued studying and composing Church music to the end of his life. He died in České Budějovice where he is remembered by a street named after him.

== Selected works ==
Piano

- Pensées du soir, Op. 10 (1854)
- Preghiera (1881)
- Vzpomínka na Zákupy Op. 19

Organ

- Studies, Op. 13, 14 (1867); Op 16, 17
