= Church of the Holy Trinity, Opočno =

Church in the Czech Republic

Coordinates: 50.2652°N 16.1139°E

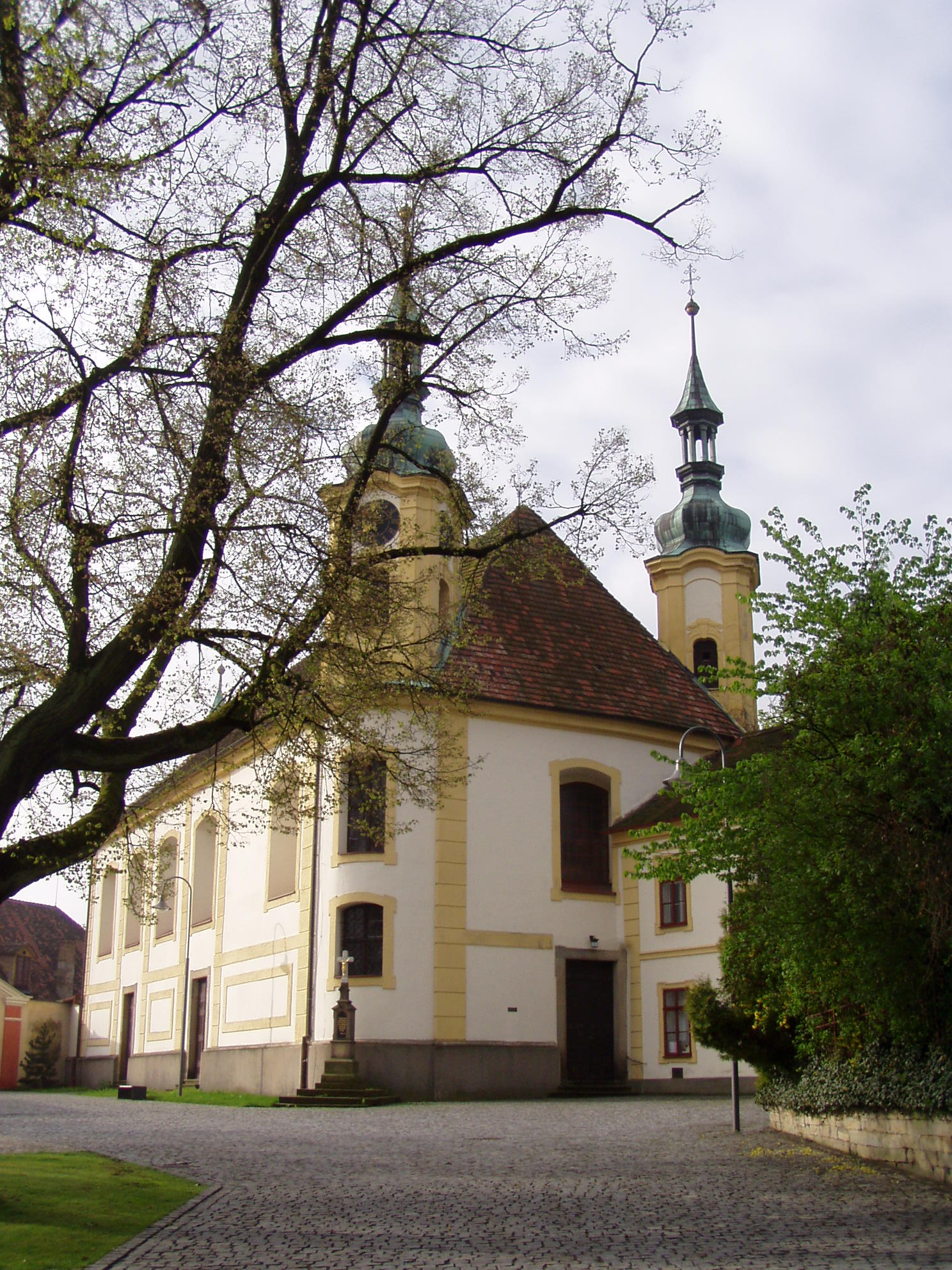
Front view

Ringing of the church bells (1941)

Church of the Holy Trinity (Czech: kostel Nejsvětější Trojice) is a Roman Catholic Parish church in Opočno in the Hradec Králové Region of the Czech Republic. The church is a part of a building complex of the Opočno Castle, which is a national cultural monument.

== History ==
The Church of the Holy Trinity was built in its present form with three naves and groin vaults supported by 10 pillars in 1567. In that time the owner of Opočno Vilém Trčka of Lípa decided to rebuild his residence in Opočno Castle as well as the adjoining Chapel of St. Andrew. The Gothic chapel was extended and converted into a Renaissance church. Although the new church was built in the heyday of the Renaissance style in Bohemia, the ceiling of the church still resembles the older Gothic architecture. On the other hand, the stone galleries with embossed decorations inside the church provide evidence for a strong influence of Italian Renaissance architecture. A passageway leading to the family oratory in the first floor of the church connects the church with Opočno Castle.

In 1716, the church underwent a Baroque reconstruction commissioned by Jeroným Colloredo. The presbytery was reconstructed and two towers were designed and built by Giovanni Battista Alliprandi.

== Architecture ==
=== Interior ===
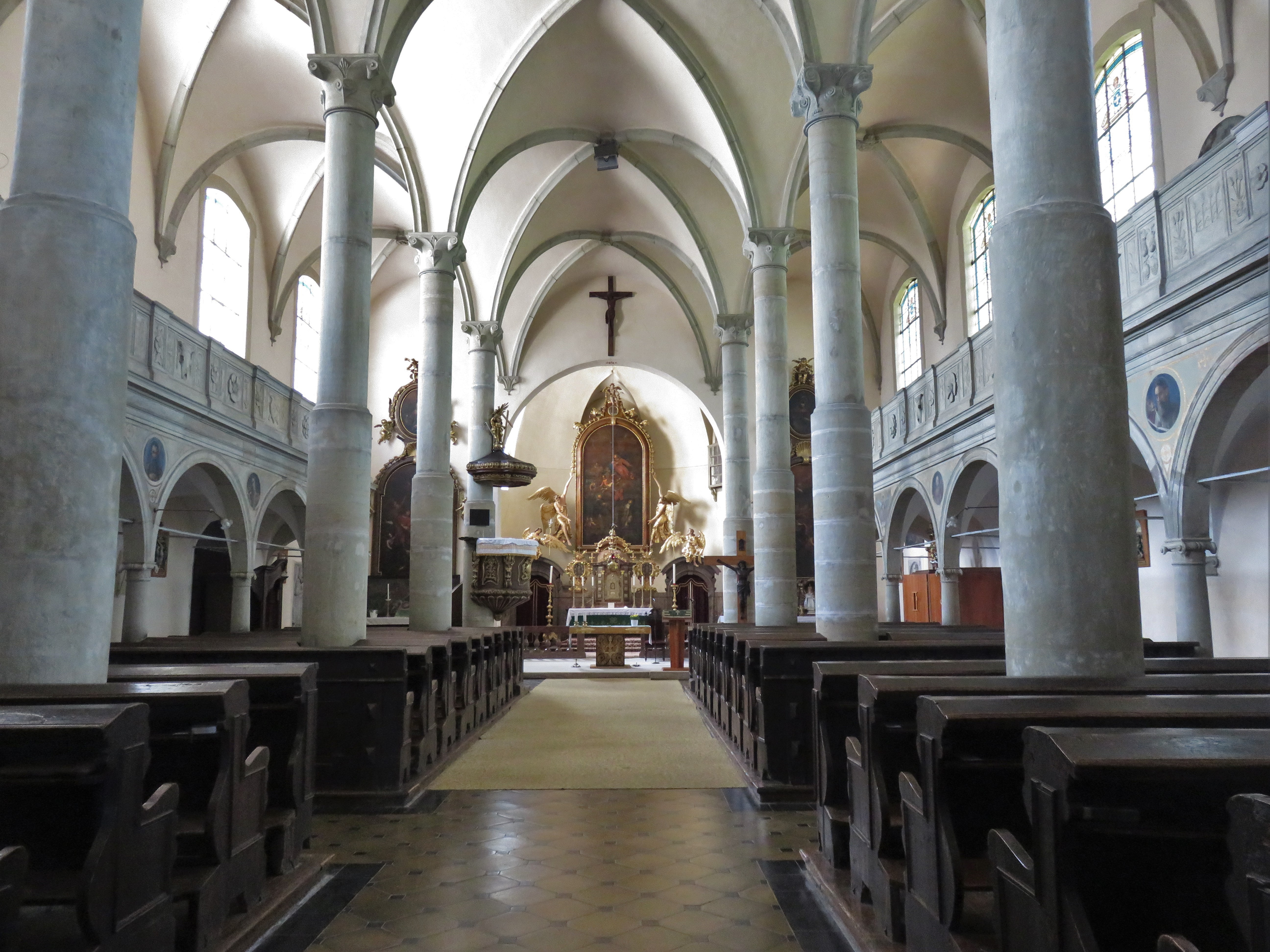
Interior of the church

The main marble altar was commissioned by Jeroným Colloredo in the early 18th century. The altarpiece represents the Assumption of the Virgin Mary. In the upper part of the painting there is depicted the Holy Trinity.

There are two side altars, one dedicated to the Bohemian patron saints, the other to the early Christian martyrs. Around the altars there are the gravestones of the owners of Opočno Castle, the members of Trčka of Lípa and Colloredo families.

The wooden pulpit with a statue of resurrected Christ was made by the Italian carver G. B. Bully in 1711.

The modern altar table from 1979 was designed by Václav Hartman, Catholic priest in Hronov.

== See also ==
- Church of the Nativity, Opočno
