= Naděžda Kavalírová =

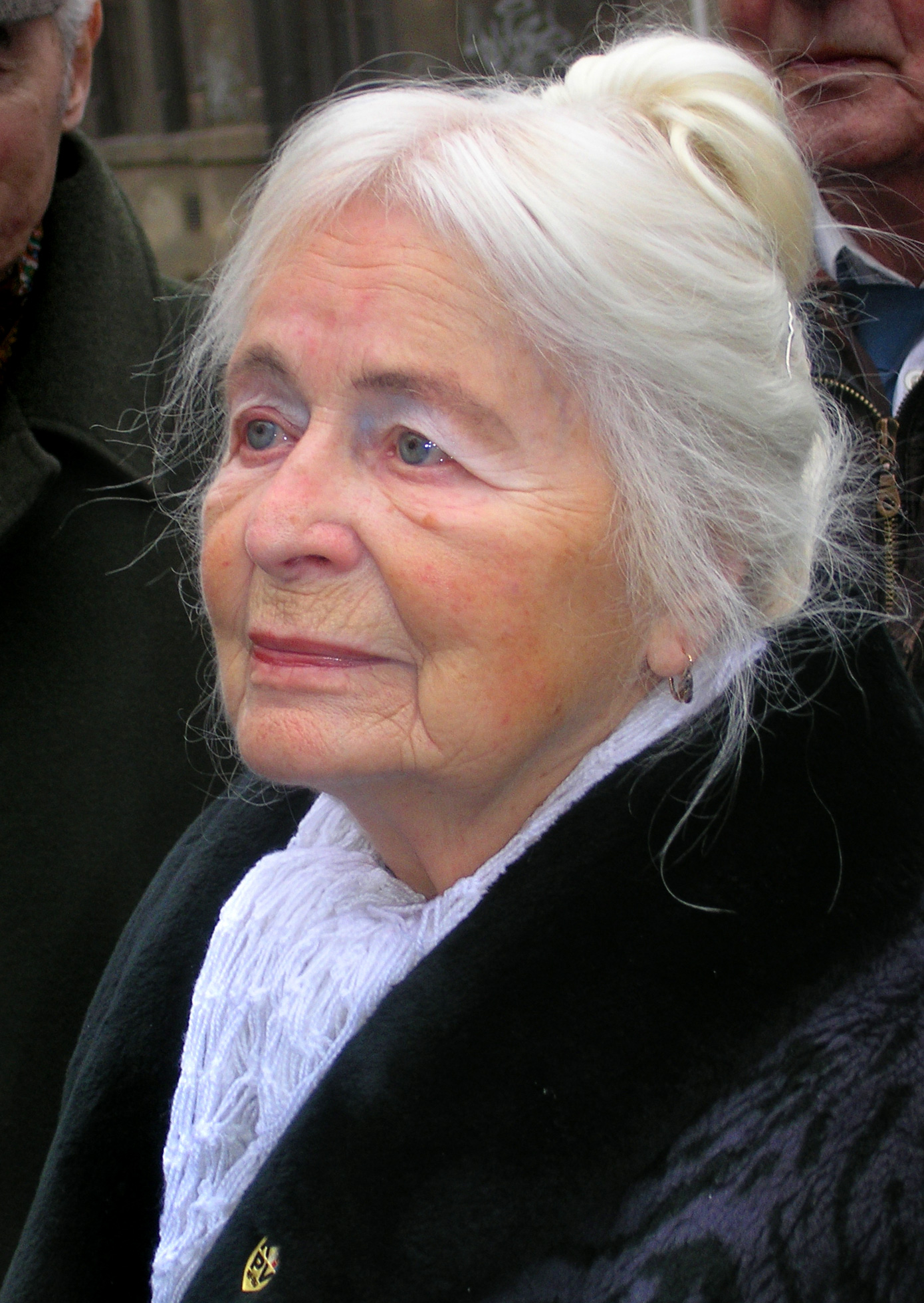
Naděžda Kavalírová in November 2008.

Naděžda Kavalírová (13 November 1923 – 20 January 2017) was a Czech paramedic, human rights activist and political prisoner. She became actively involved in the resistance to Czechoslovakia's Communist government. She later headed the Confederation of Political Prisoners (Konfederace politických vězňů České republiky) from 2003 until her death in January 2017.

== Life ==
Kavalírová was born Naděžda Morávková in Opočno, Czechoslovakia, in 1923. In 1948, following the takeover of Czechoslovakia by the Communist government, Kavalírová was expelled from the faculty of the School of Medicine at the Charles University in Prague due to her membership in the Czech National Social Party. She soon became actively involved in the country's opposition movement against the Communist government. In 1956, Kavalírová was convicted of treason and espionage against the Communist government. She was sentenced to three years as a political prisoner from 1956 to 1959. She was a member of Czechoslovak National Socialist Party and participated in a student march to Prague Castle.

Kavalírová headed the Institute for the Study of Totalitarian Regimes from 2007 to 2013. She also served as the leader of the Confederation of Political Prisoners from 2003 until her death in January 2017.

Naděžda Kavalírová died in Pardubice, Czech Republic, on 20 January 2017, at the age of 93.
