= Opočno Castle =

Coordinates: 50°15′53.5″N 16°06′56.1″E

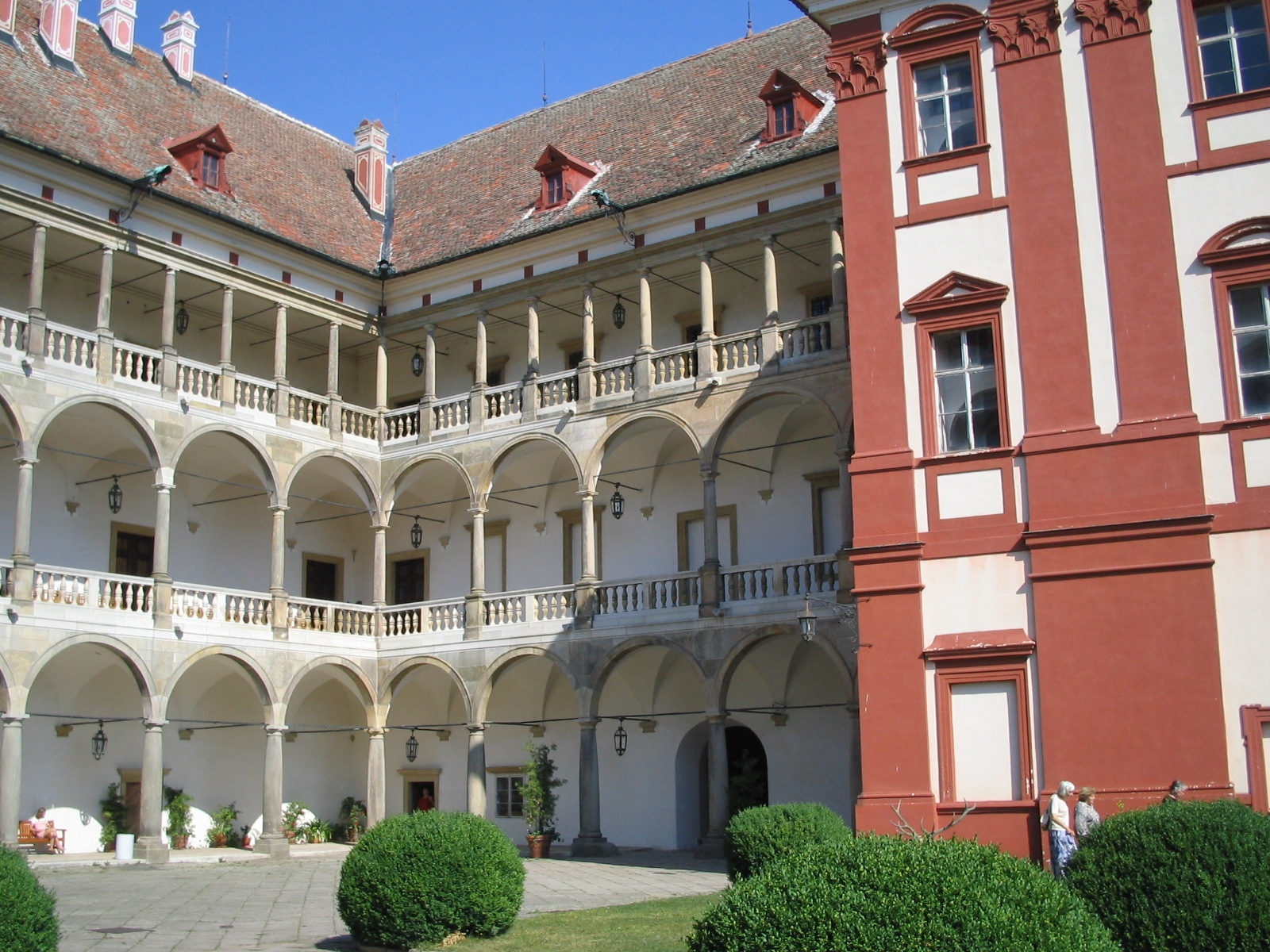
Courtyard of Opočno Castle

Opočno Castle (Czech: zámek Opočno) is a complex of buildings comprising a former aristocratic residence located in the East Bohemian town of Opočno, Czech Republic. Its outer arcades are a valuable example of the Renaissance architecture in Bohemia.

== History ==
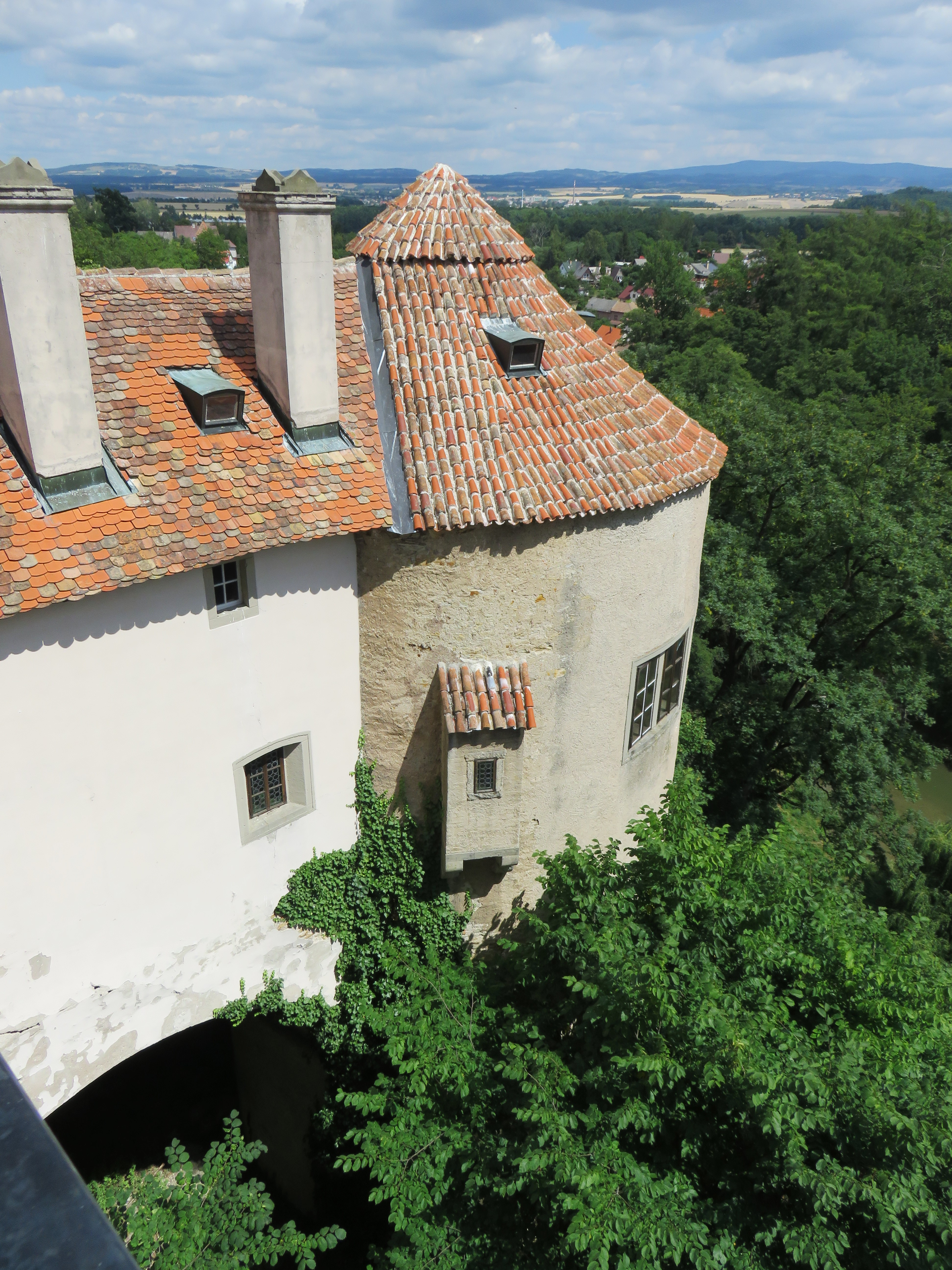
The medieval Well Tower was part of the outer bailey.

The place was first mentioned in 1068 by Cosmas of Prague as a fortified settlement. Later a Gothic castle was built in its location. In 1425 the castle was conquered by East Bohemian Hussites and later it was reconstructed. The round Well Tower is the only still existing part of the original medieval castle.

In 1495 the domain of Opočno was bought by the family Trčka of Lípa. Vilém Trčka of Lípa, who undertook a journey to Italy in 1551, rebuilt the palace in the Renaissance style between 1560–67. In this time the new Renaissance arcades were built after Italian examples. Vilém then rebuilt also the original chapel of St. Andrew into the new Church of the Holy Trinity which was planned for the burials of the Trčka family. In 1602 a summer pavilion was built by Jan Rudolf Trčka overlooking the valley of the valley Zlatý potok (German: Goldbach) and he also founded a new garden around the summer house.

After the murder of Adam Erdman Trčka (together with Albrecht of Wallenstein) in Cheb (German: Eger) in 1634 and the death of his father in the same year, the Trčka family died out in the male line. Opočno was confiscated and the Emperor Ferdinand II allowed the Colloredo family to buy the property for 51,456 Rhenish guilders. Rudolf Colloredo von Walsee was a general of the Imperial army during the Thirty Years' War. In the 1690s the palace, especially its southern wing, was reconstructed after a fire under Hieronymous Colloredo von Walsee. In this time the chapel of St. Anne in the southern wing got its present appearance. These Baroque changes were carried out also by the architect Giovanni Battista Alliprandi.

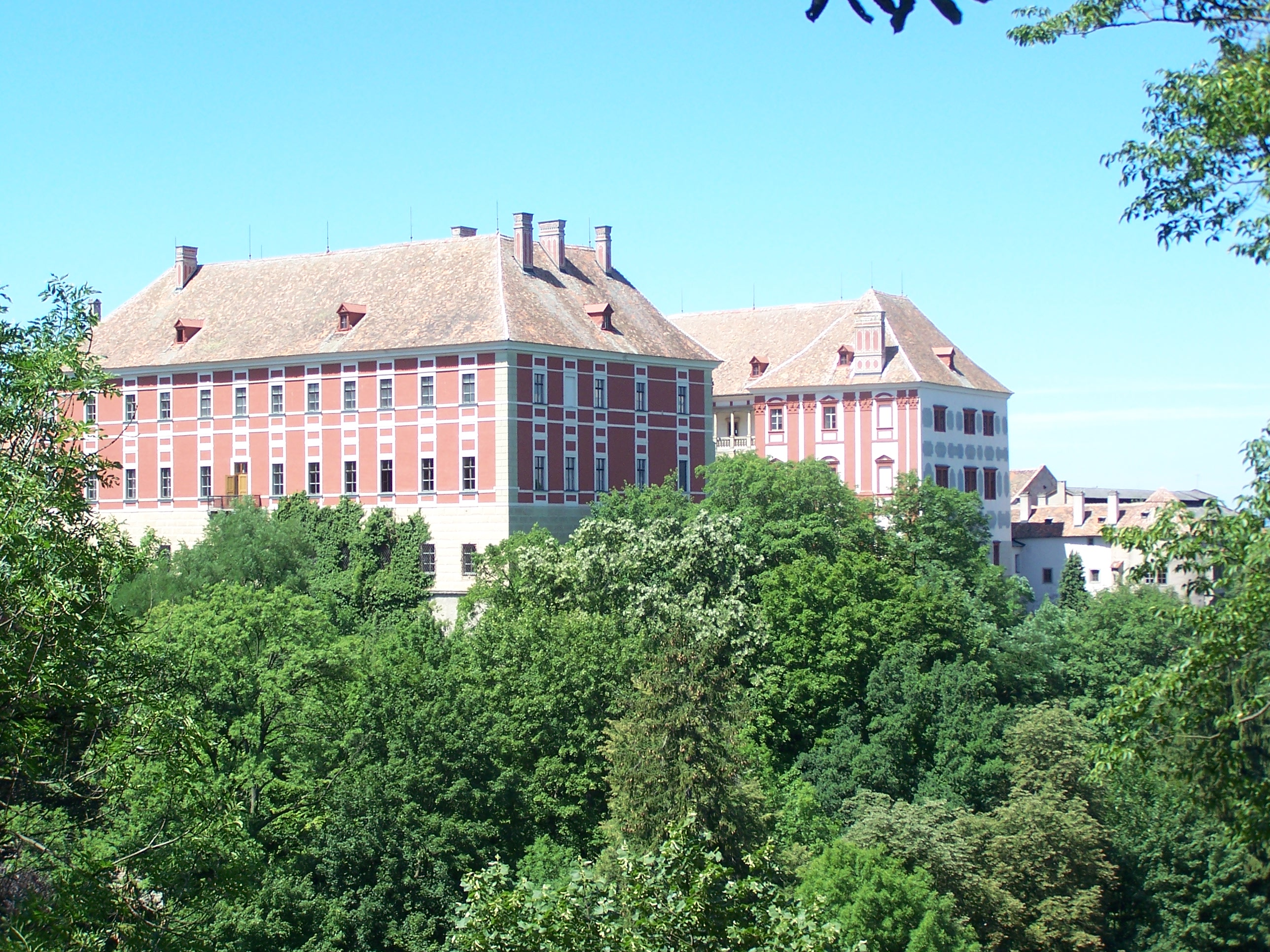
View of Opočno Castle

Since then the Colloredos have substantially modified the chateau and even founded a 22-hectare (54-acre) English garden with rare trees, ponds and waterfalls. In 1895 the exceptionally valuable and large family painting gallery was brought to Opočno from Prague.

During the World War II, the owners of Opočno Castle, the Princely family of Colloredo-Mansfeld, opposed the Nazi occupation of Czechoslovakia, therefore their Castle was confiscated in 1942 by Nazi Germany. After the war Opočno Castle passed to possession of the Czechoslovak state and because of the subsequent Communist rule it could not be returned to the Colloredo-Mansfeld family that emigrated in 1948 for fear of persecutions by the Communist government. First in 2003 the Czech courts decided to return Opočno Castle to the Colloredo-Mansfeld family, but in 2007 the decision was reversed with regard to the castle and its collections, while the farmland was returned. In 2014 the Czech Supreme Court ordered a new trial concerning the unresolved restitution claims of the Colloredo-Mansfeld family.

== Today ==
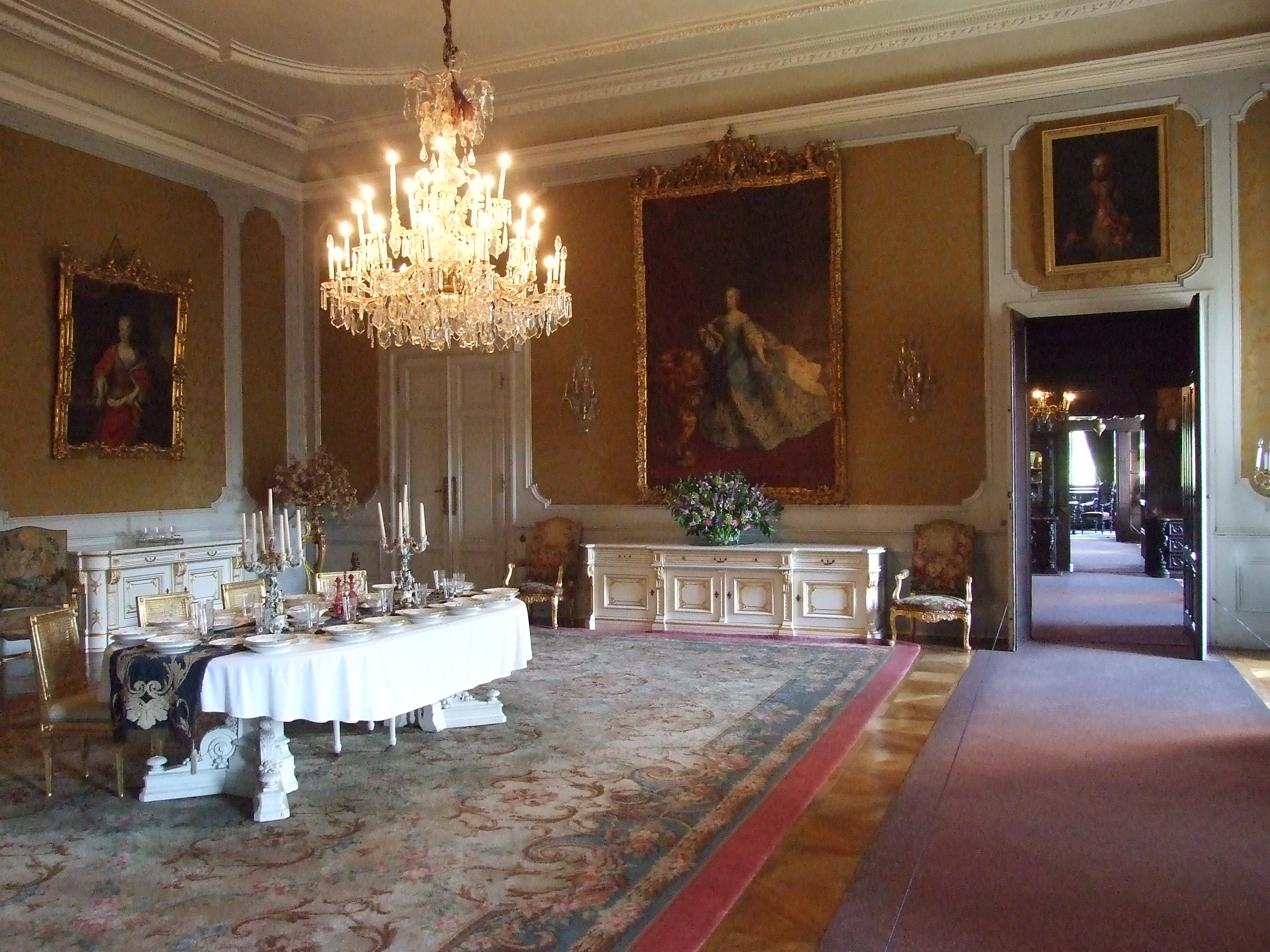
Rooms of the castle

The castle is opened to the public and serves as a museum with many historical interiors, a gallery, a library, ethnographic collections, and an armoury housing weaponry from 16th to 19th centuries including oriental weapons.
