= Colloredo =

Colloredo is a surname that may refer to:

- Colloredo-Mansfeld, Princely family which was based in Bohemia and Austria, with Waldsee and Melz subsidiary names
  - Rudolf von Colloredo (1585–1657), Field Marshal of the Holy Roman Empire, who fought in the Thirty Years' War
  - Hieronymus von Colloredo (1732–1812), Prince-Bishop of Gurk from 1761, last Prince-Archbishop of Salzburg from 1771 until 1803, employer of Mozart
  - Hieronymus Karl Graf von Colloredo-Mansfeld (1775–1822), Austrian corps commander during the Napoleonic Wars, brother of the last
  - Filippo di Colloredo-Mels (1778–1864), leader of the Sovereign Military Order of Malta
- Lazarus and Joannes Baptista Colloredo (1617–1646), Italian conjoined twins who toured in 17th-century Europe
- Mickaël Colloredo (born 1980), French football striker currently playing for French Ligue 2 side Nîmes Olympique
- Sebastian Colloredo (born 1987), Italian ski jumper who has competed since 2002

== See also ==
- Colloredo di Monte Albano, comune (municipality) in the Province of Udine in the Italian region Friuli-Venezia Giulia
- Villa Colloredo Mels - Civic Museum in Recanati, Marche
