= House of Colloredo-Mannsfeld =

Noble family

Princely arms of the family

The House of Colloredo-Mansfeld (German pronunciation: [ˌkɔlo:.ʀe:dɔ.ˈmans.fɛlt]) is an originally Italian noble family of which a branch came to Austria in the late 16th century. There they were raised to barons in 1588, imperial counts in 1727 and imperial princes (in primogeniture) in 1763. They obtained Opočno Castle in the Kingdom of Bohemia in 1634 and acquired numerous further estates in Bohemia and Austria. In 1945 they were expropriated and expelled from the Czechoslovak Republic, but returned after 1990 and had parts of their former estates restituted. The family is one of the Mediatised Houses because the Princes were Sovereign of the County of Rieneck.

== History ==
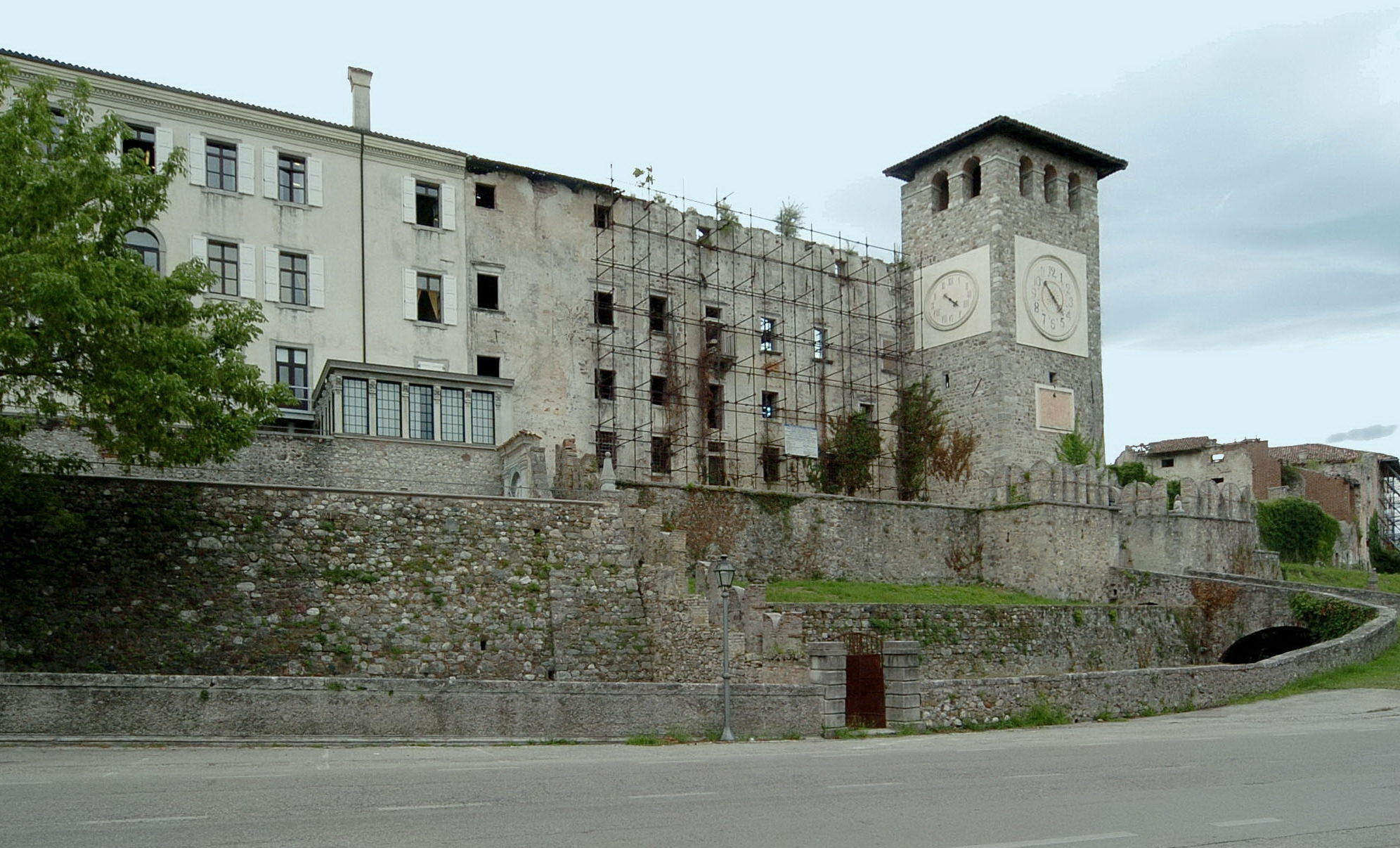
Colloredo Castle, Italy

The Colloredo family is originally from Colloredo di Monte Albano, Italy, where they owned numerous estates. According to family tradition, it descends from the Swabian Lords of Waldsee. Allegedly, Liebhart (Liobardo) of Waldsee came to Italy attending King Conrad II and about 1031 was enfeoffed by Patriarch Poppo of Aquileia with Mels Castle near Udine in Friuli. His descendants from 1309 onwards built Colloredo Castle as their residence. The Waldsee lineage however is disputed today.

The house was elevated to the noble rank of Freiherr by the Habsburg Emperor Rudolf II in 1588 and became Reichsgraf in 1724.
In 1634 two Colloredo brothers were granted Opočno Castle in Bohemia by Ferdinand II, Holy Roman Emperor.
Rudolph Joseph von Colloredo (1706-1788), Vice-Chancellor of Empress Maria Theresa, was appointed Prince of the Holy Roman Empire in 1763.

The Colloredo-Mansfeld line emerged when his son Franz de Paula Gundakar von Colloredo married Princess Maria Isabella of Mansfeld in 1771 and was able to inherit her family's Bohemian estates with Dobříš Castle upon the extinction of the dynasty's male line in 1780, while the original Mansfeld possessions passed to the Prussian Duchy of Magdeburg. The union of the houses of Colloredo and Mansfeld was officially approved by decree of Emperor Joseph II in 1789; the decree used the spelling Colloredo-Mannsfeld whilst the spelling Colloredo-Mansfeld was more common.

In 1803 Prince Franz Gundakar purchased a part of the County of Rieneck from the House of Nostitz because its Imperial immediacy granted him a seat in the Imperial Diet, although he never moved there. In 1806 this territory was mediatised by the Archbishop of Regensburg, Karl Theodor von Dalberg, as part of his Principality of Aschaffenburg. In 1815 Rieneck was annexed by the Kingdom of Bavaria. The Prince purchased in 1804 a portion of the County of Limpurg known as the Lordship of Limpurg-Gröningen; this was mediatised by the Kingdom of Württemberg in 1806.

In the Second Czechoslovak Republic about half of the family possessions of 60,000 hectares of forests and farmland was expropriated during a land reform. Under German occupation (Protectorate of Bohemia and Moravia), when the Colloredos who had become Czechoslovak citizens refused to become Germans, their remaining estates were confiscated by the Nazis and some of the nephews of prince Joseph II. (who lived in Paris) were arrested for slave work, others emigrated. After World War II, the family returned but only to face arrest and torture again, and subsequently expulsion from Czechoslovakia where they were again expropriated, this time "as Germans" under the Beneš decrees. They emigrated to Canada and the US. Their only remaining possession was Gstatt forest estate in Austria that they had purchased in 1929, while a younger branch still owns Sierndorf in Austria (purchased in 1756).

Parts of the Colloredo's possessions, among them Dobříš Castle and Zbiroh Castle and their farmlands, were restored by the Czech Republic to Jerome Colloredo-Mansfeld (who sold the latter and left the first to his nephew Jerome). Opočno Castle was returned to prince Joseph III's daughter Kristina Colloredo-Mansfeld. A high court decision however forced her to give the castle back to the State while she was allowed to keep the farmland. A lawsuit over the arts collection at Opočno Castle is still pending. Countess Kristina is living in Opočno and in Gstatt, Austria. The family now owns again about 20,000 of their original 60,000 hectares.

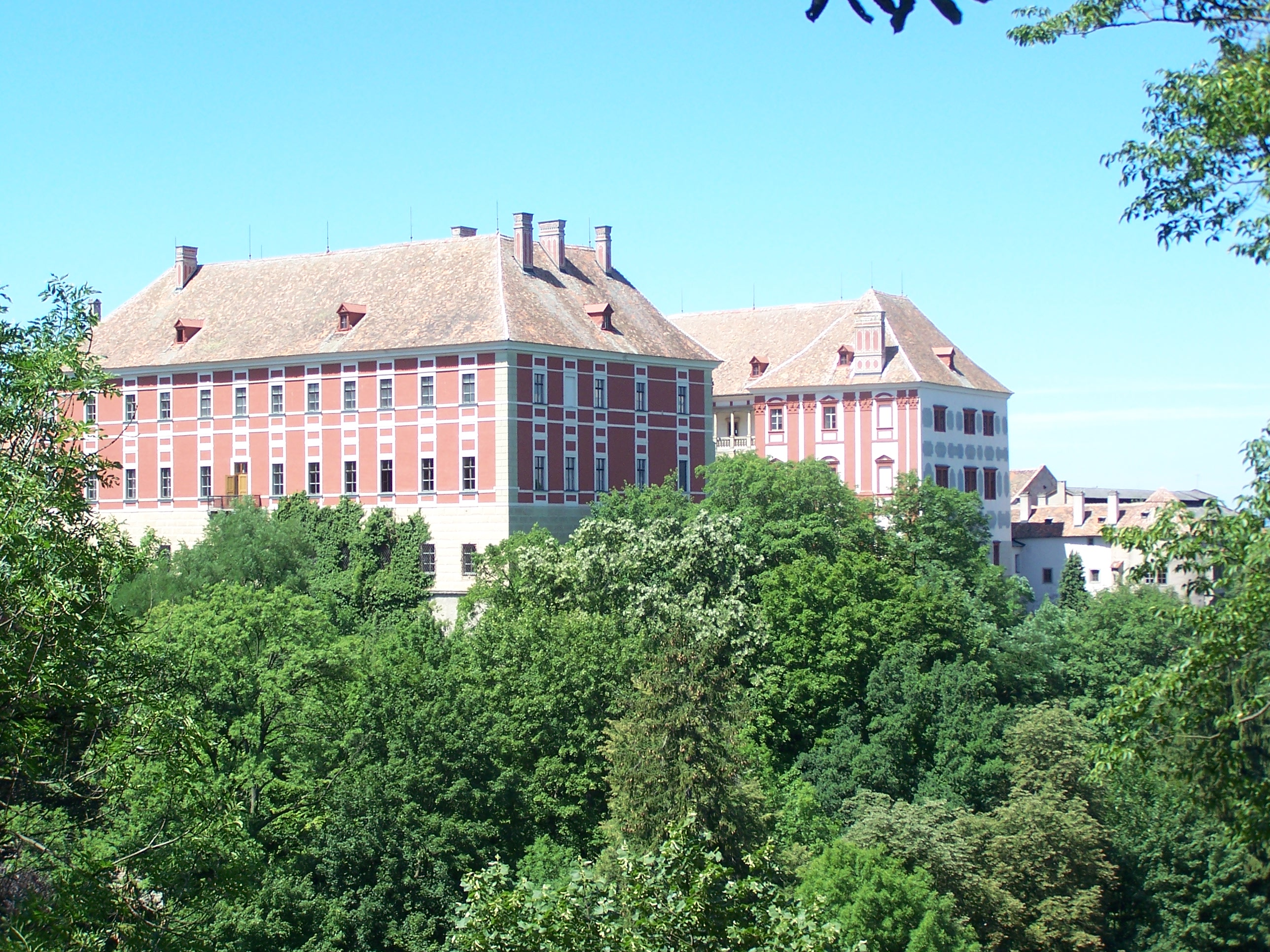
Opočno Castle, Czech Republic

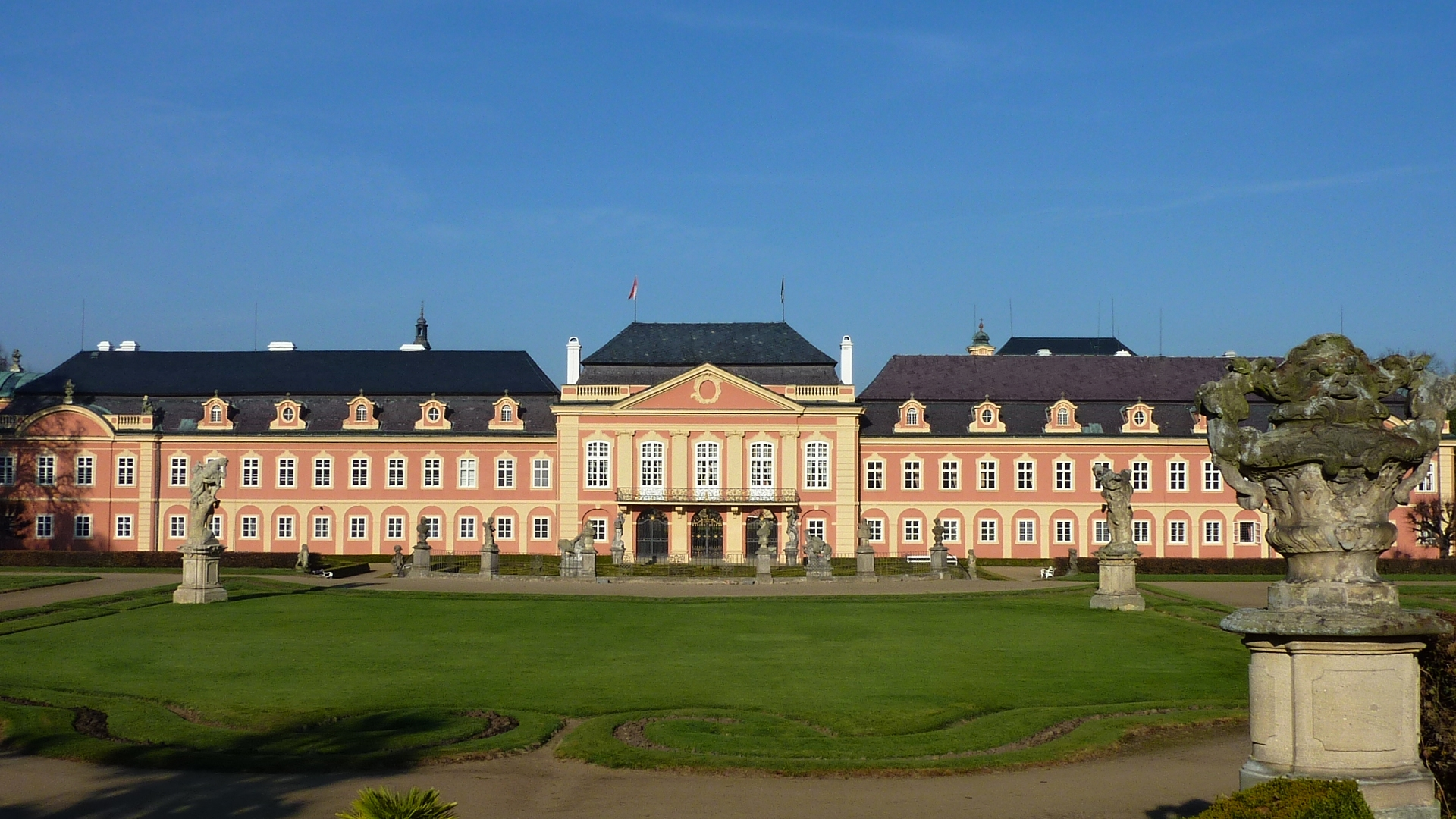
Dobříš Castle, Czech Republic

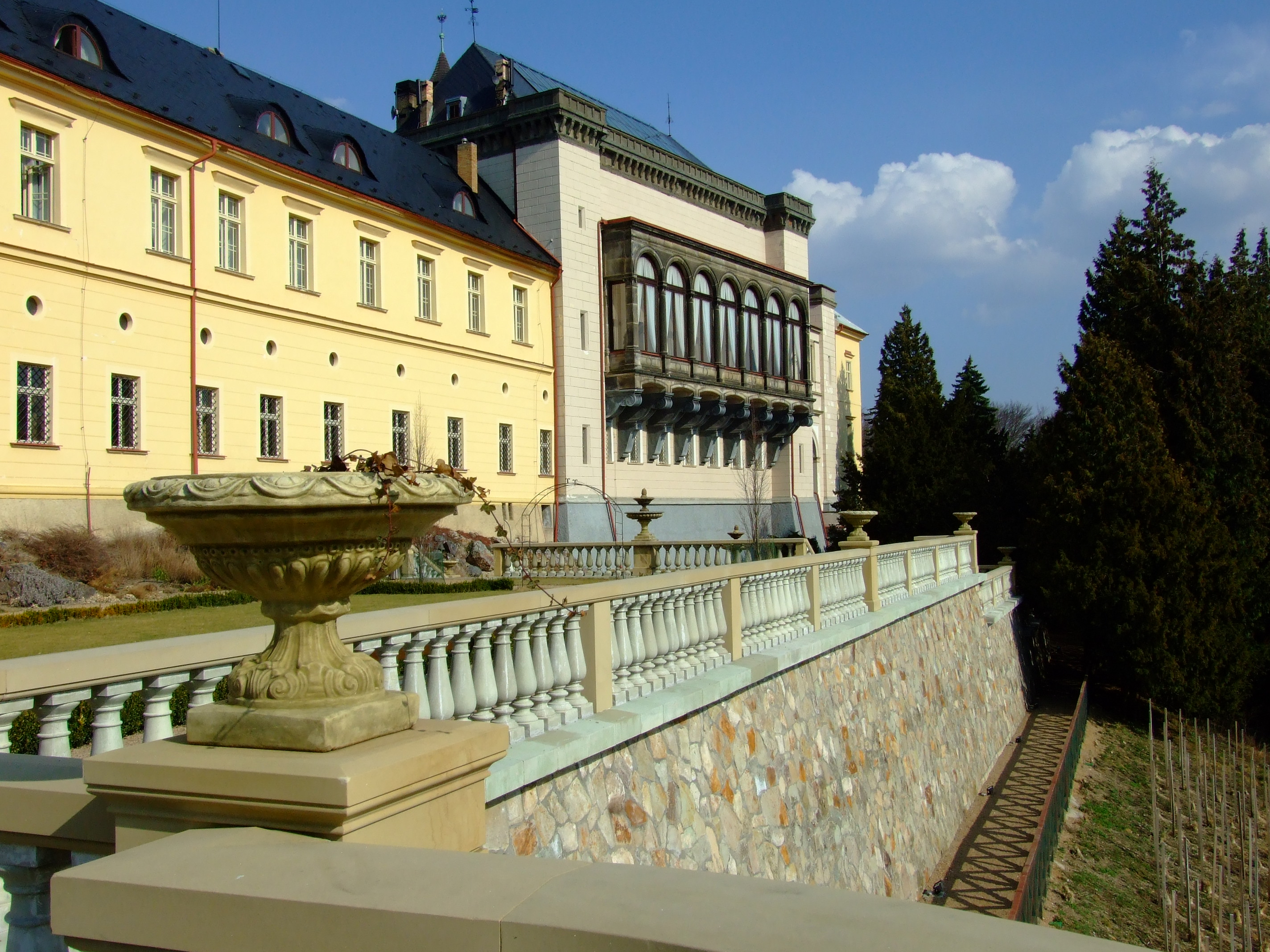
Zbiroh Castle, Czech Republic

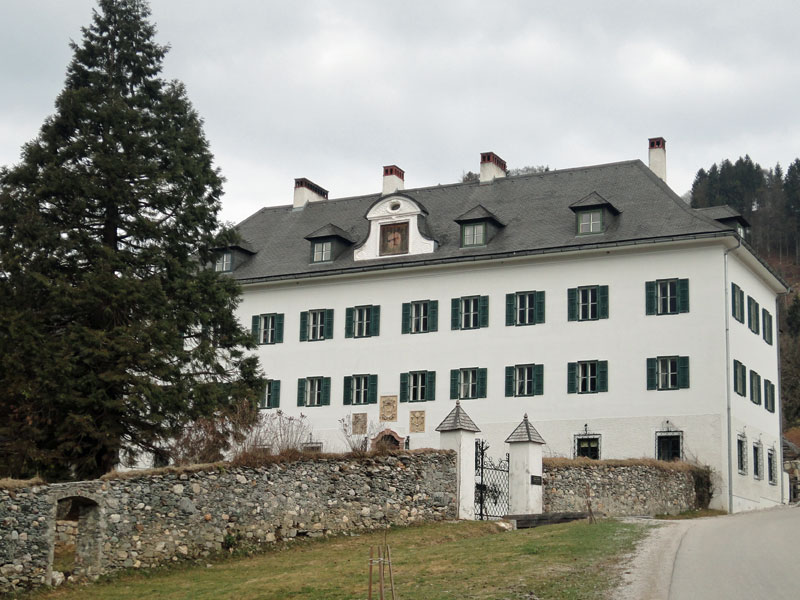
Gstatt Castle, Austria

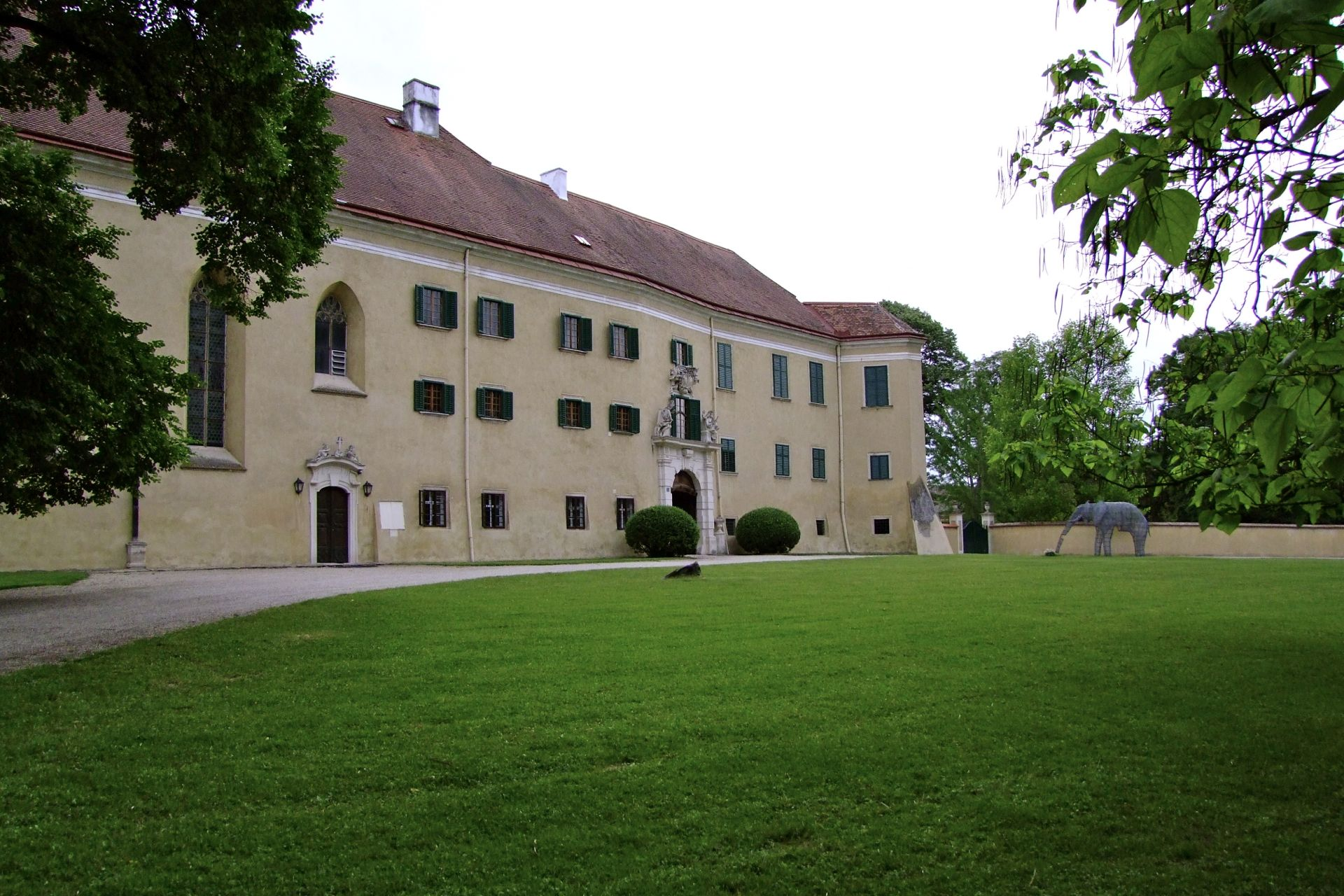
Sierndorf Castle, Austria

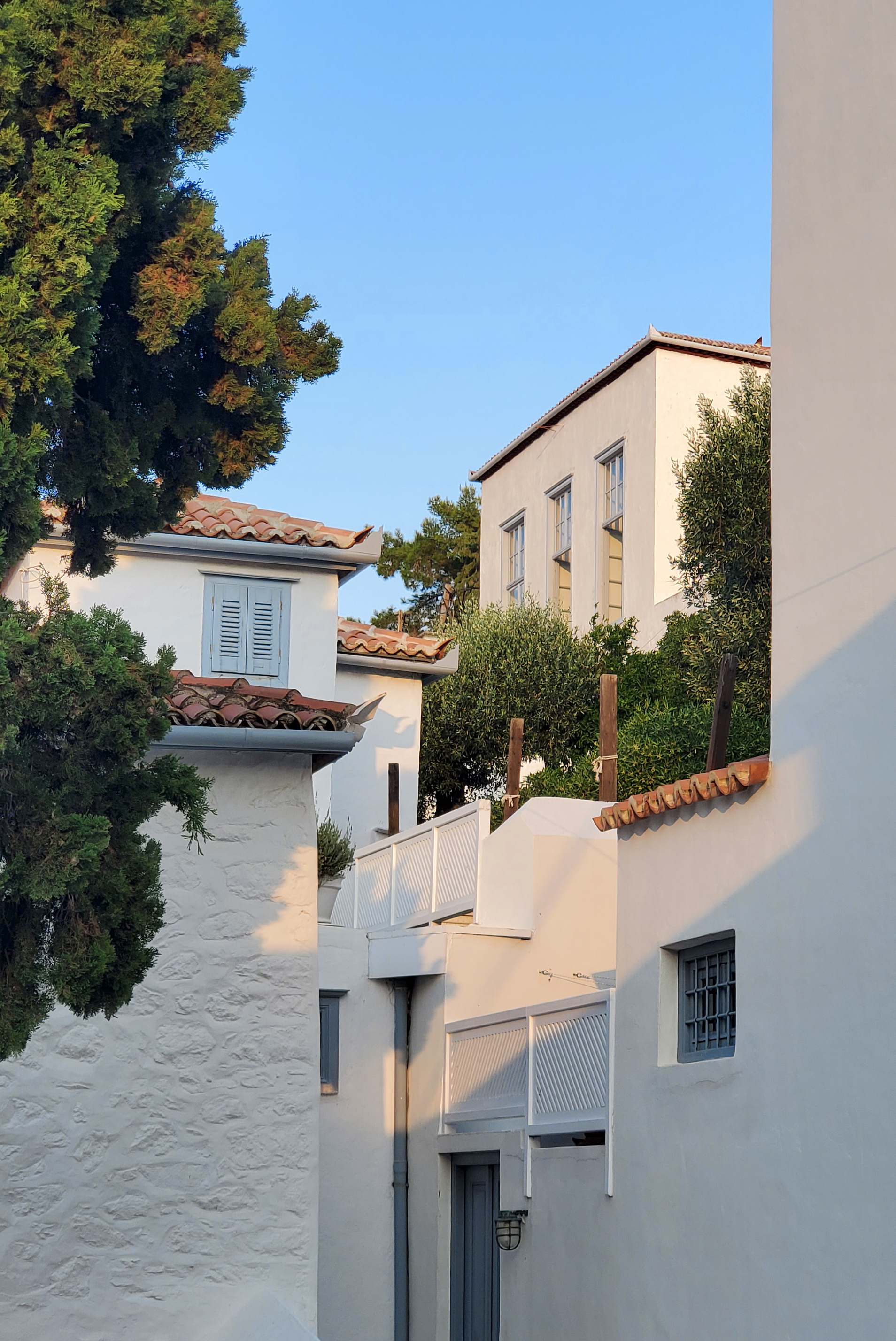
Old Carpet Factory mansion, Hydra, Greece. Originally built for the prominent Tsamados family in the 18th century.

== Princes of Colloredo-Mannsfeld (1789–present) ==
Heraldic shield of the arms

- Franz Gundackar, Count 1788–1789, 1st Prince 1789-1807 (1731-1789), son of Rudolph Joseph, Prince (1763) and Vice-Chancellor
  - Rudolf, 2nd Prince 1807-1843 (1772-1843)
  - Count Hieronymus (1775-1822)
    - Franz, 3rd Prince 1843-1852 (1802-1852)
  - Count Ferdinand (1777-1848)
    - Joseph, 4th Prince 1852-1895 (1813-1895)
      - Hieronymus, Hereditary Prince of Colloredo-Mannsfeld (1842-1881)
        - Joseph, 5th Prince 1895-1957 (1866-1957)
        - Count Hieronymus (1870-1942)
          - Joseph, 6th Prince 1957-1990 (1910-1990)
          - Hieronymus, 7th Prince 1990-1998 (1912-1998)
          - Count Friedrich (1917-1991)
            - Hieronymus, 8th Prince 1998–present (b.1949)
              - Paul-Josef Count of Mannsfeld, Hereditary Prince of Colloredo-Mannsfeld (b.1981)
                - Count Hieronymus (b.2011)
                - Count Felix (b.2013)
                - Count Paul (b.2016)
              - Count Lelio (b.1985)

== Notable members ==
- Hieronymus Graf von Colloredo (1732–1812) was Prince-Bishop of Gurk from 1761 and last Prince-Archbishop of Salzburg from 1771 until 1803, when the Archbishopric was secularized.
- Hieronymus Karl Graf von Colloredo-Mansfeld (1775–1822) was an Austrian corps commander during the Napoleonic Wars.
- Franz Gundaker von Colloredo-Mansfeld (1802–1852), his son, was an Austrian corps commander during the suppression of the Hungarian Revolution of 1848.
- Filippo di Colloredo-Mels (1778–1864), leader of the Sovereign Military Order of Malta from the Italian branch of the family
