= Křenovice =

Křenovice may refer to places in the Czech Republic:

- Křenovice (Písek District), a municipality and village in the South Bohemian Region
- Křenovice (Přerov District), a municipality and village in the Olomouc Region
- Křenovice (Vyškov District), a municipality and village in the South Moravian Region
- Křenovice, a village and part of Dubné in the South Bohemian Region
- Křenovice, a village and part of Vojkov in the Central Bohemian Region
