= Branice (Písek District) =

- Municipality
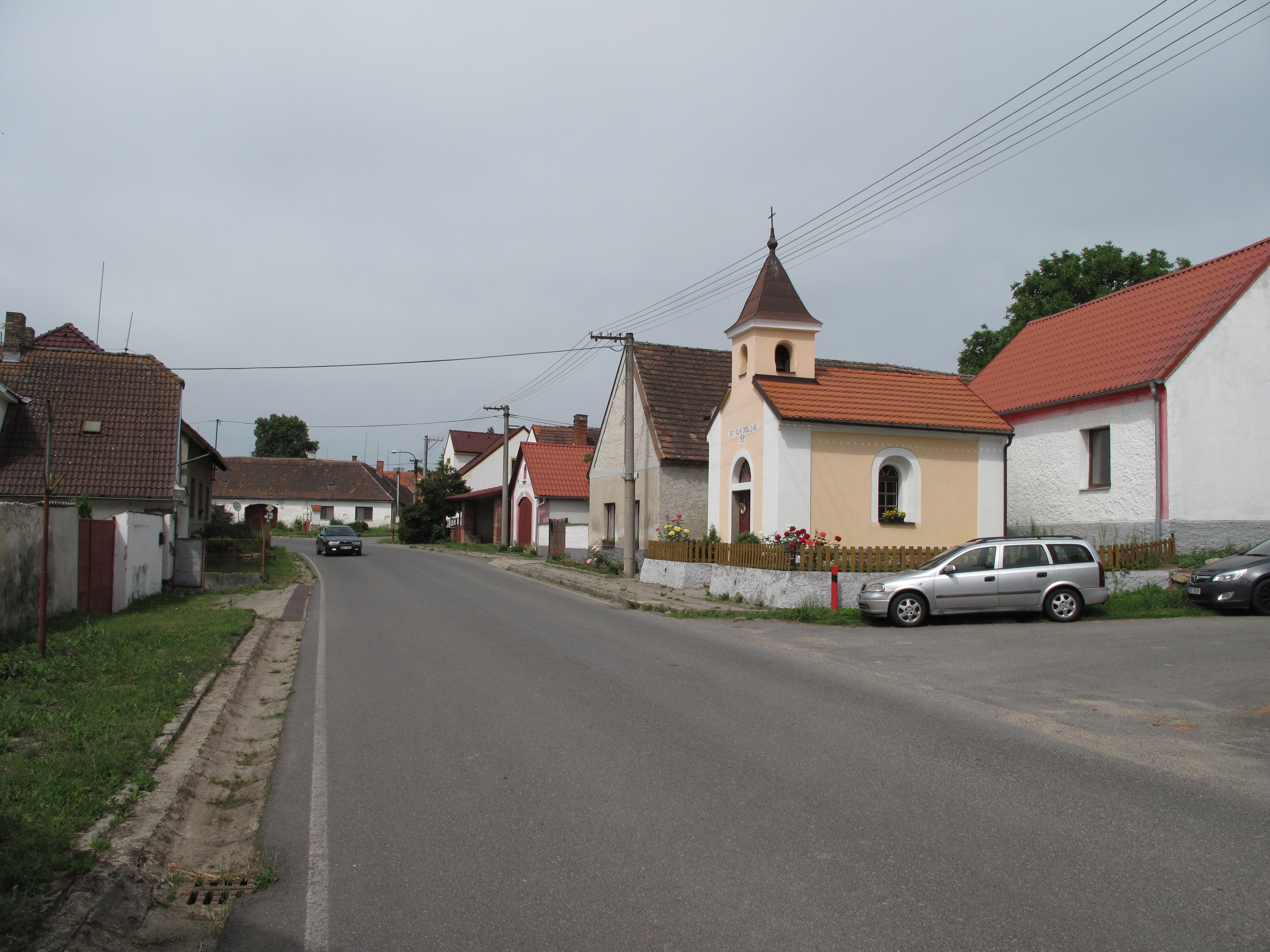
- Main street

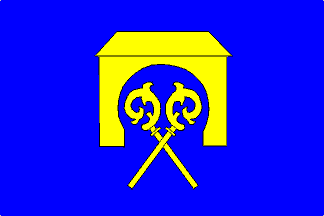
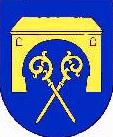
- Flag Coat of arms

- Location in the Czech Republic
- Coordinates: 49°24′9″N 14°20′22″E
- Country: Czech Republic
- Region: South Bohemian
- District: Písek
- First mentioned: 1488

Area
  - Total: 5.06 km^{2} (1.95 sq mi)
- Elevation: 493 m (1,617 ft)

Population (2026-01-01)
  - Total: 308
  - Density: 60.9/km^{2} (158/sq mi)
- Time zone: UTC+1 (CET)
  - Summer (DST): UTC+2 (CEST)
- Postal code: 398 43
- Website: www.branice.cz

Branice is a municipality and village in Písek District in the South Bohemian Region of the Czech Republic. It has about 300 inhabitants.

Branice lies approximately 19 kilometres (12 mi) north-east of Písek, 49 km (30 mi) north of České Budějovice, and 77 km (48 mi) south of Prague.

== Demographics ==
Historical population
| Year | Pop. | ±% |
|---|---|---|
| 1869 | 228 | — |
| 1880 | 217 | −4.8% |
| 1890 | 227 | +4.6% |
| 1900 | 241 | +6.2% |
| 1910 | 270 | +12.0% |
| 1921 | 297 | +10.0% |
| 1930 | 310 | +4.4% |
| 1950 | 276 | −11.0% |
| 1961 | 298 | +8.0% |
| 1970 | 308 | +3.4% |
| 1980 | 331 | +7.5% |
| 1991 | 323 | −2.4% |
| 2001 | 302 | −6.5% |
| 2011 | 297 | −1.7% |
| 2021 | 279 | −6.1% |
Source: Censuses
