= Křižanov =

Křižanov may refer to places in the Czech Republic:

- Křižanov (Písek District), a municipality and village in the South Bohemian Region
- Křižanov (Žďár nad Sázavou District), a market town in the Vysočina Region
- Křižanov Highlands, a mountain range
- Křižanov, a village and part of Hořičky in the Hradec Králové Region
- Křižanov, a village and part of Hrob in the Ústí nad Labem Region
- Křižanov, a village and part of Hynčina in the Olomouc Region
