= Svatkovice =

- Village
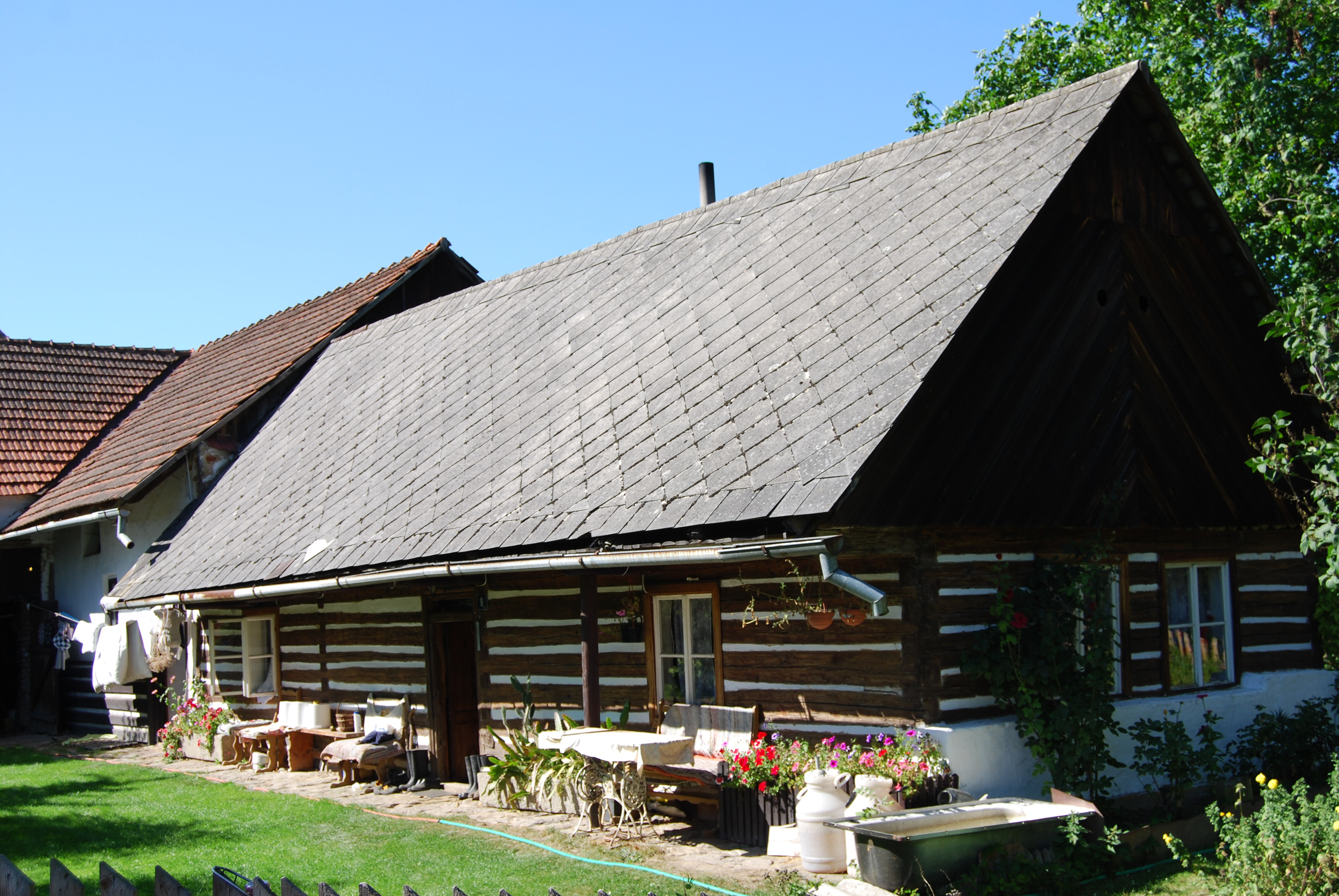

- Location within Czech Republic
- Coordinates: 49°20′34″N 14°21′59″E
- Country: Czech Republic
- Region: South Bohemian
- District: Písek

Population (2001)
  - Total: 67

Svatkovice is a village in Písek District in the South Bohemian Region of the Czech Republic.

The village covers an area of 3.69 square kilometres (1.42 sq mi), and has a population of 67 (as at 2001).

The first written mention of it dates to 1486.
