= Hrejkovice =

- Municipality
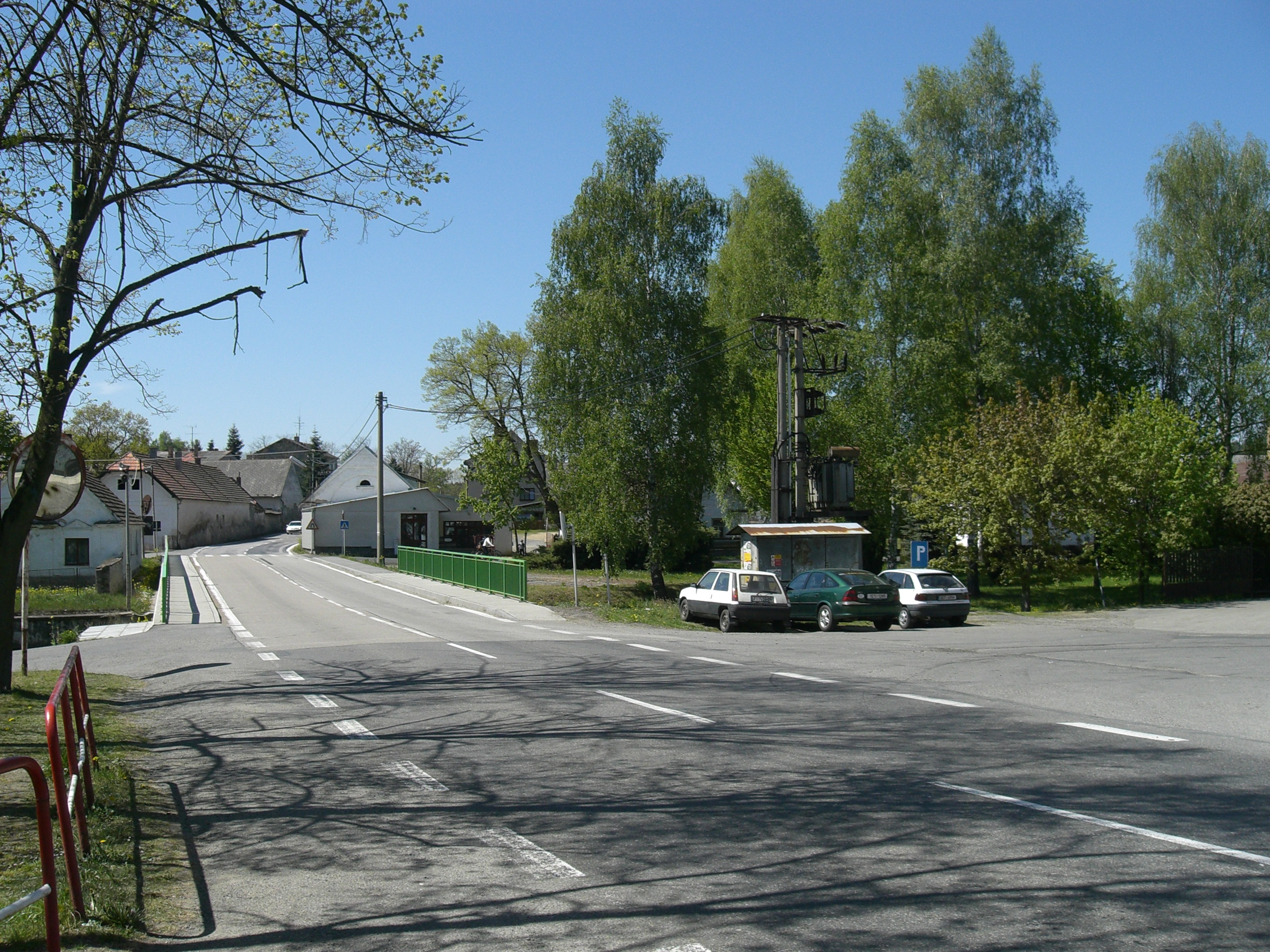
- Main street

- Flag Coat of arms

- Location in the Czech Republic
- Coordinates: 49°28′28″N 14°17′27″E
- Country: Czech Republic
- Region: South Bohemian
- District: Písek
- First mentioned: 1216

Area
  - Total: 13.41 km^{2} (5.18 sq mi)
- Elevation: 471 m (1,545 ft)

Population (2026-01-01)
  - Total: 481
  - Density: 35.9/km^{2} (92.9/sq mi)
- Time zone: UTC+1 (CET)
  - Summer (DST): UTC+2 (CEST)
- Postal code: 398 59
- Website: www.hrejkovice.cz

Hrejkovice is a municipality and village in Písek District in the South Bohemian Region of the Czech Republic. It has about 500 inhabitants.

Hrejkovice lies approximately 23 kilometres (14 mi) north-east of Písek, 57 km (35 mi) north of České Budějovice, and 69 km (43 mi) south of Prague.

== Administrative division ==
Hrejkovice consists of four municipal parts (in brackets population according to the 2021 census):

- Hrejkovice (218)
- Chlumek (34)
- Níkovice (80)
- Pechova Lhota (137)

== Demographics ==
Historical population
Year	Pop.	±%
1869	1,137	—
1880	1,170	+2.9%
1890	1,123	−4.0%
1900	1,088	−3.1%
1910	1,030	−5.3%
1921	1,040	+1.0%
1930	1,018	−2.1%
1950	781	−23.3%
1961	743	−4.9%
1970	644	−13.3%
1980	581	−9.8%
1991	508	−12.6%
2001	437	−14.0%
2011	475	+8.7%
2021	469	−1.3%
Source: Censuses
