= Přeborov =

- Municipality
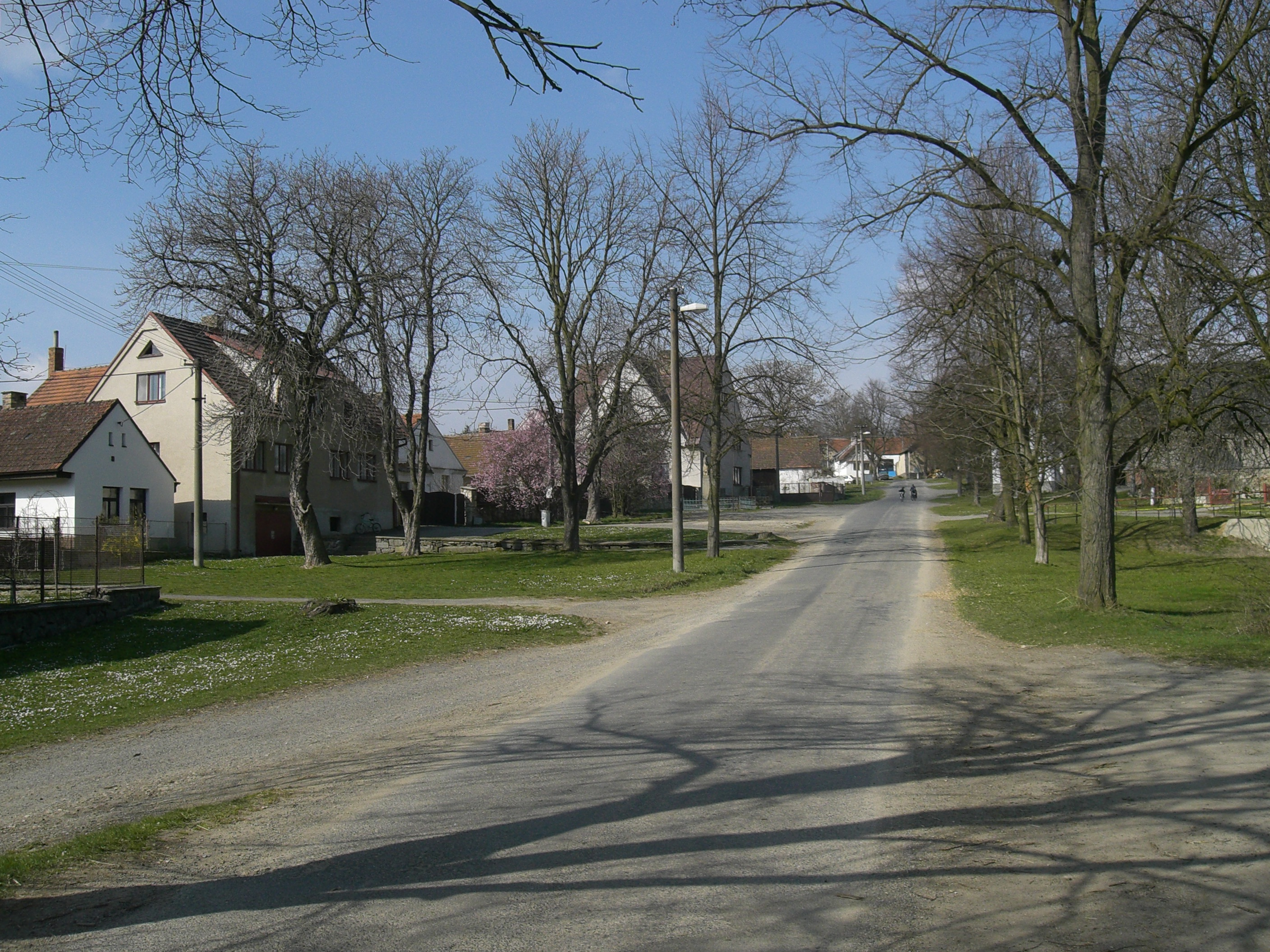
- Centre of Přeborov

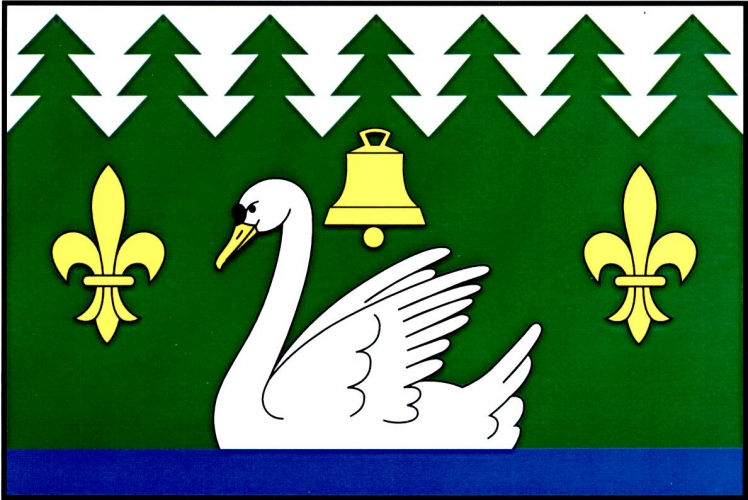
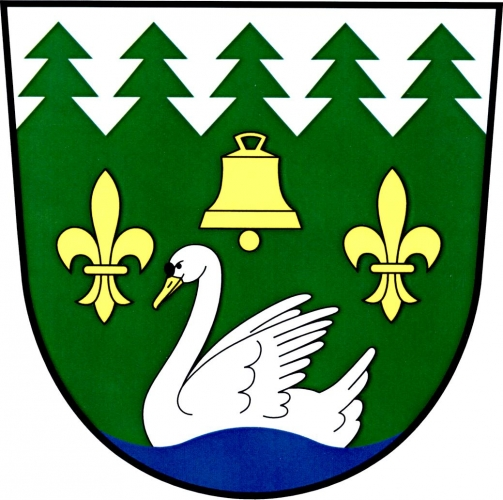
- Flag Coat of arms

- Location in the Czech Republic
- Coordinates: 49°28′46″N 14°21′26″E
- Country: Czech Republic
- Region: South Bohemian
- District: Písek
- First mentioned: 1488

Area
  - Total: 4.44 km^{2} (1.71 sq mi)
- Elevation: 480 m (1,570 ft)

Population (2026-01-01)
  - Total: 141
  - Density: 31.8/km^{2} (82.2/sq mi)
- Time zone: UTC+1 (CET)
  - Summer (DST): UTC+2 (CEST)
- Postal code: 399 01
- Website: www.preborov.cz

Přeborov is a municipality and village in Písek District in the South Bohemian Region of the Czech Republic. It has about 100 inhabitants.

== Etymology ==
The name is derived from the personal name Přebor, meaning "Přebor's (court)".

== Geography ==
Přeborov is located about 24 kilometres (15 mi) northeast of Písek and 60 km (37 mi) south of Prague. It lies in the Vlašim Uplands. The highest point is at 567 m (1,860 ft) above sea level.

== History ==
The first written mention of Přeborov is from 1488.

== Demographics ==
Historical population

Year	Pop.	±%
1869	470	—
1880	470	+0.0%
1890	380	−19.1%
1900	345	−9.2%
1910	318	−7.8%

Year	Pop.	±%
1921	347	+9.1%
1930	347	+0.0%
1950	268	−22.8%
1961	236	−11.9%
1970	194	−17.8%

Year	Pop.	±%
1980	165	−14.9%
1991	147	−10.9%
2001	143	−2.7%
2011	130	−9.1%
2021	134	+3.1%

Source: Censuses

== Transport ==
There are no railways or major roads passing through the municipality.

== Sights ==
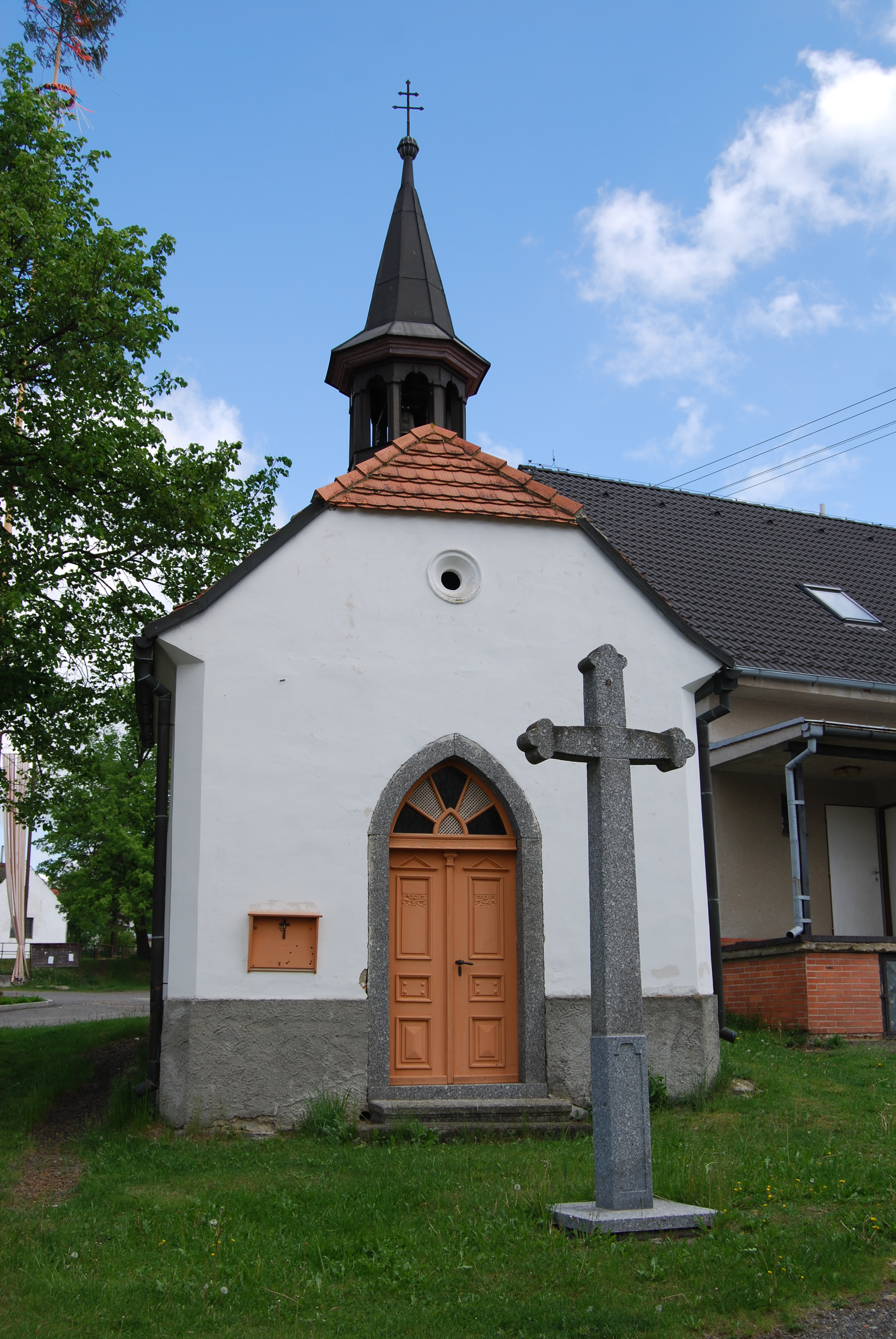
Chapel of the Visitation of the Virgin Mary

There are no protected cultural monuments in the municipality. In the centre of Přeborov is the Chapel of the Visitation of the Virgin Mary.
