= Probulov =

- Municipality
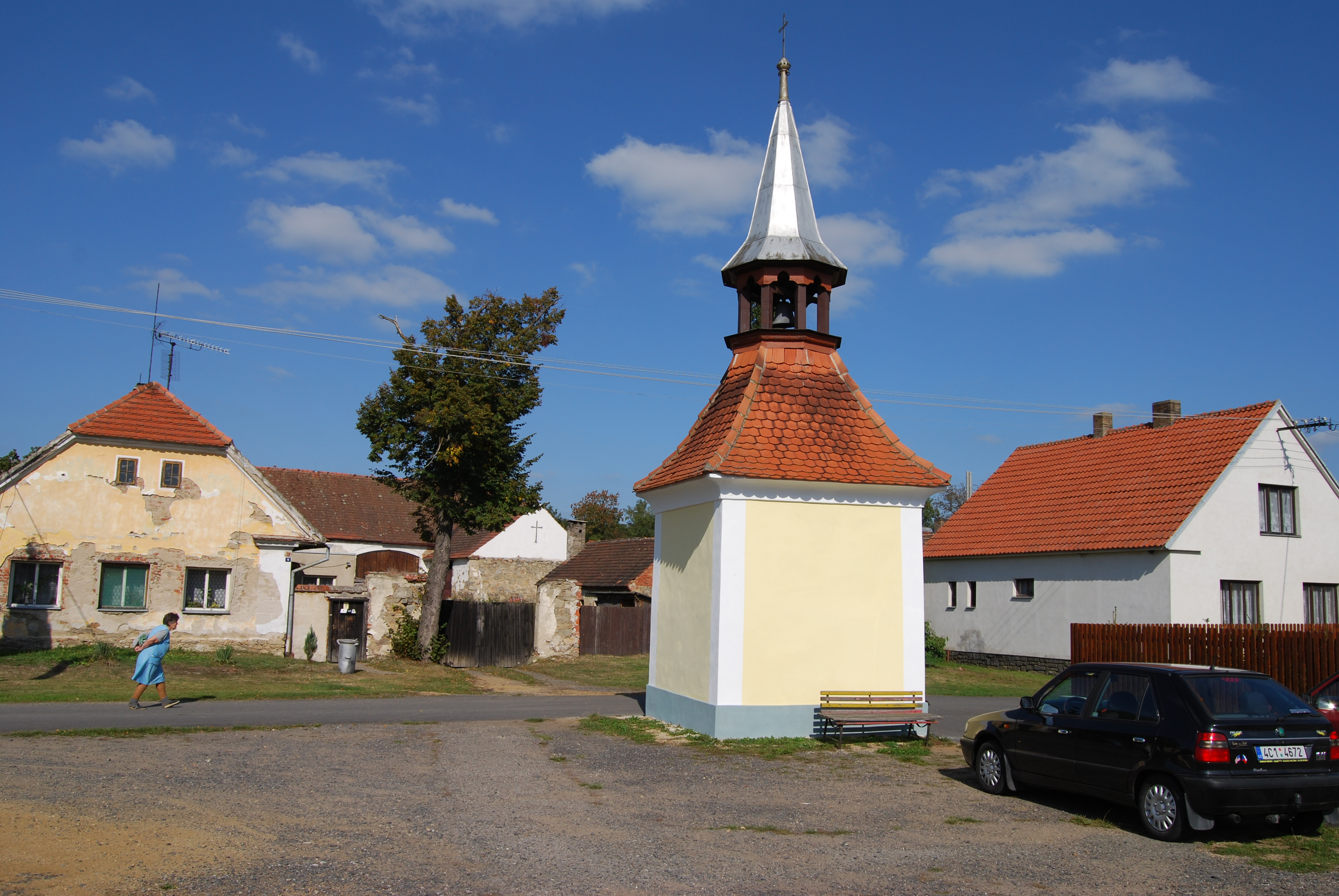
- Chapel in the centre of Probulov

- Location in the Czech Republic
- Coordinates: 49°29′34″N 14°8′43″E
- Country: Czech Republic
- Region: South Bohemian
- District: Písek
- First mentioned: 1312

Area
  - Total: 3.47 km^{2} (1.34 sq mi)
- Elevation: 462 m (1,516 ft)

Population (2026-01-01)
  - Total: 69
  - Density: 20/km^{2} (52/sq mi)
- Time zone: UTC+1 (CET)
  - Summer (DST): UTC+2 (CEST)
- Postal code: 398 07
- Website: www.probulov.cz

Probulov is a municipality and village in Písek District in the South Bohemian Region of the Czech Republic. It has about 70 inhabitants.

Probulov lies approximately 22 kilometres (14 mi) north of Písek, 63 km (39 mi) north-west of České Budějovice, and 69 km (43 mi) south of Prague.

== Demographics ==
Historical population
Year	Pop.	±%
1869	359	—
1880	385	+7.2%
1890	359	−6.8%
1900	347	−3.3%
1910	322	−7.2%
1921	281	−12.7%
1930	264	−6.0%
1950	192	−27.3%
1961	187	−2.6%
1970	141	−24.6%
1980	112	−20.6%
1991	67	−40.2%
2001	57	−14.9%
2011	51	−10.5%
2021	66	+29.4%
Source: Censuses
