= Kučeř =

- Municipality
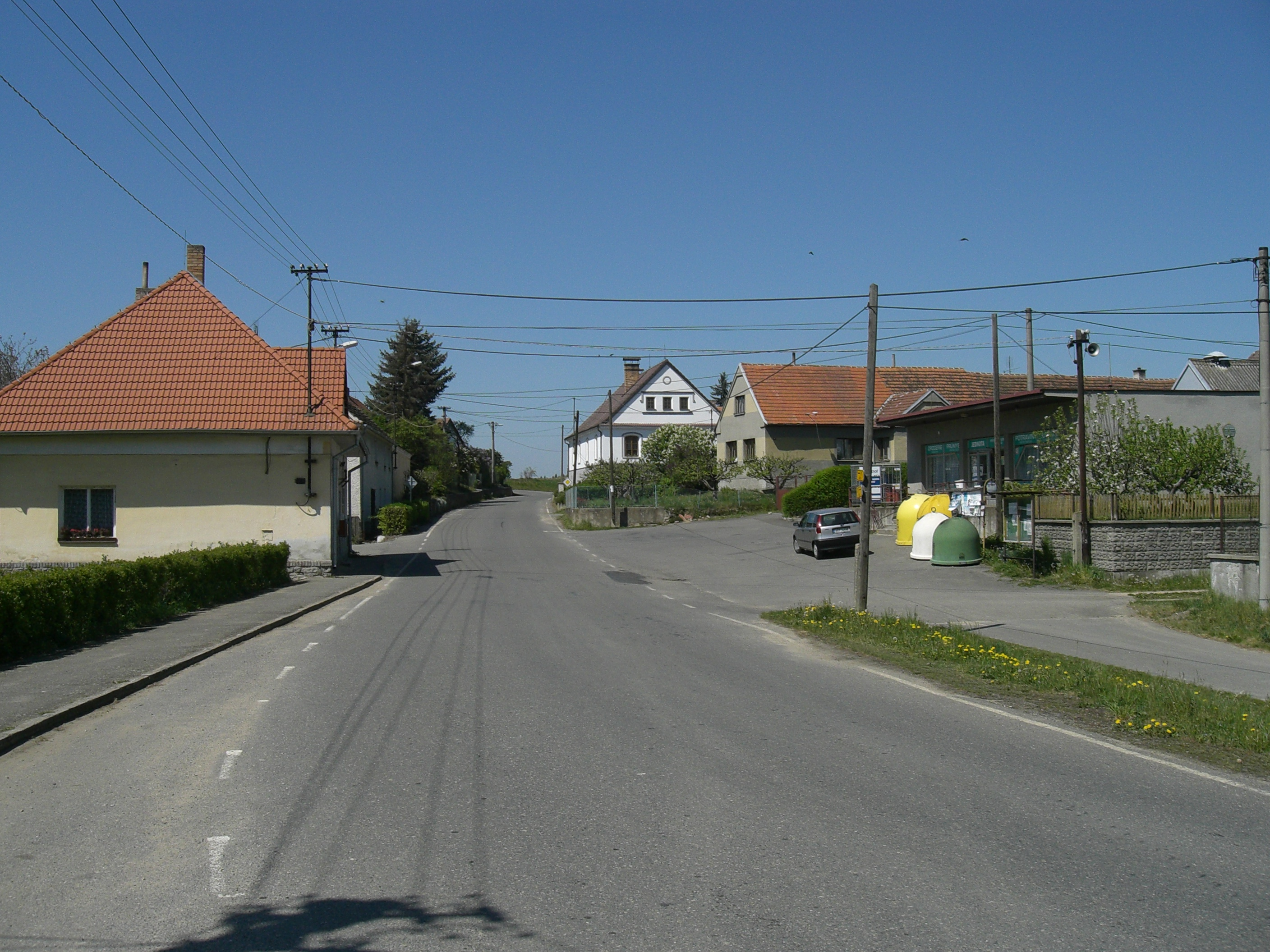
- Main street

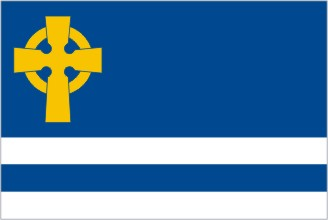
- Flag Coat of arms

- Location in the Czech Republic
- Coordinates: 49°26′4″N 14°14′44″E
- Country: Czech Republic
- Region: South Bohemian
- District: Písek
- First mentioned: 1488

Area
  - Total: 10.95 km^{2} (4.23 sq mi)
- Elevation: 432 m (1,417 ft)

Population (2026-01-01)
  - Total: 183
  - Density: 16.7/km^{2} (43.3/sq mi)
- Time zone: UTC+1 (CET)
  - Summer (DST): UTC+2 (CEST)
- Postal code: 398 34
- Website: www.kucer.cz

Kučeř is a municipality and village in Písek District in the South Bohemian Region of the Czech Republic. It has about 200 inhabitants.

Kučeř lies approximately 17 kilometres (11 mi) north-east of Písek, 54 km (34 mi) north of České Budějovice, and 74 km (46 mi) south of Prague.

== Demographics ==
Historical population
Year	Pop.	±%
1869	598	—
1880	566	−5.4%
1890	577	+1.9%
1900	514	−10.9%
1910	538	+4.7%
1921	514	−4.5%
1930	420	−18.3%
1950	302	−28.1%
1961	284	−6.0%
1970	272	−4.2%
1980	251	−7.7%
1991	212	−15.5%
2001	168	−20.8%
2011	179	+6.5%
2021	190	+6.1%
Source: Censuses
