= Minice =

- Municipality
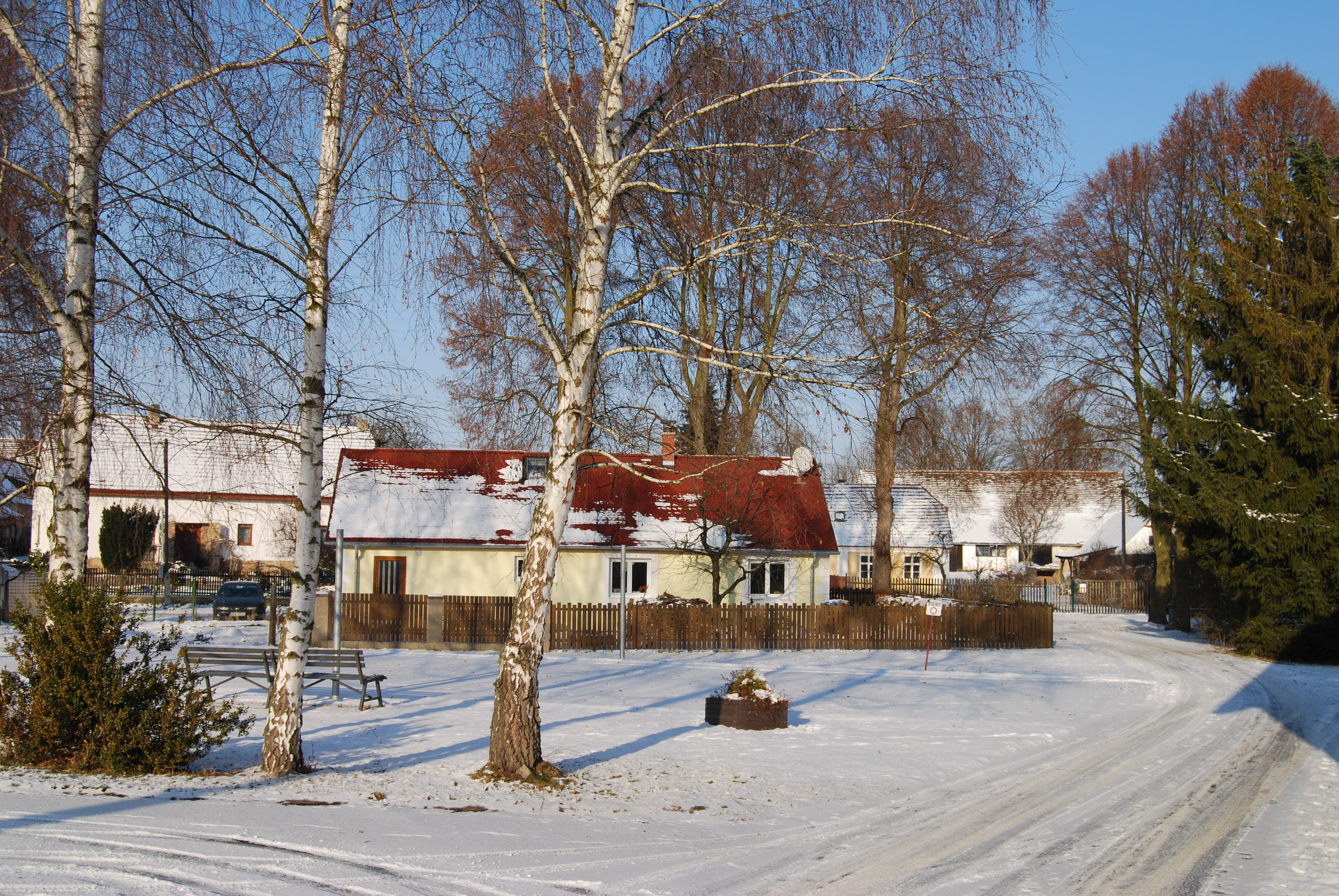
- Centre of Minice

- Location in the Czech Republic
- Coordinates: 49°29′24″N 14°0′44″E
- Country: Czech Republic
- Region: South Bohemian
- District: Písek
- First mentioned: 1312

Area
  - Total: 3.49 km^{2} (1.35 sq mi)
- Elevation: 478 m (1,568 ft)

Population (2026-01-01)
  - Total: 27
  - Density: 7.7/km^{2} (20/sq mi)
- Time zone: UTC+1 (CET)
  - Summer (DST): UTC+2 (CEST)
- Postal code: 398 04
- Website: www.obecminice.cz

Minice is a municipality and village in Písek District in the South Bohemian Region of the Czech Republic. It has about 30 inhabitants.

Minice lies approximately 23 kilometres (14 mi) north-west of Písek, 67 km (42 mi) north-west of České Budějovice, and 73 km (45 mi) south-west of Prague.

== Demographics ==
Historical population
| Year | Pop. | ±% |
|---|---|---|
| 1869 | 149 | — |
| 1880 | 139 | −6.7% |
| 1890 | 135 | −2.9% |
| 1900 | 131 | −3.0% |
| 1910 | 119 | −9.2% |
| 1921 | 120 | +0.8% |
| 1930 | 110 | −8.3% |
| 1950 | 67 | −39.1% |
| 1961 | 56 | −16.4% |
| 1970 | 56 | +0.0% |
| 1980 | 48 | −14.3% |
| 1991 | 45 | −6.2% |
| 2001 | 37 | −17.8% |
| 2011 | 39 | +5.4% |
| 2021 | 25 | −35.9% |
Source: Censuses
