= Vlastec =

- Municipality
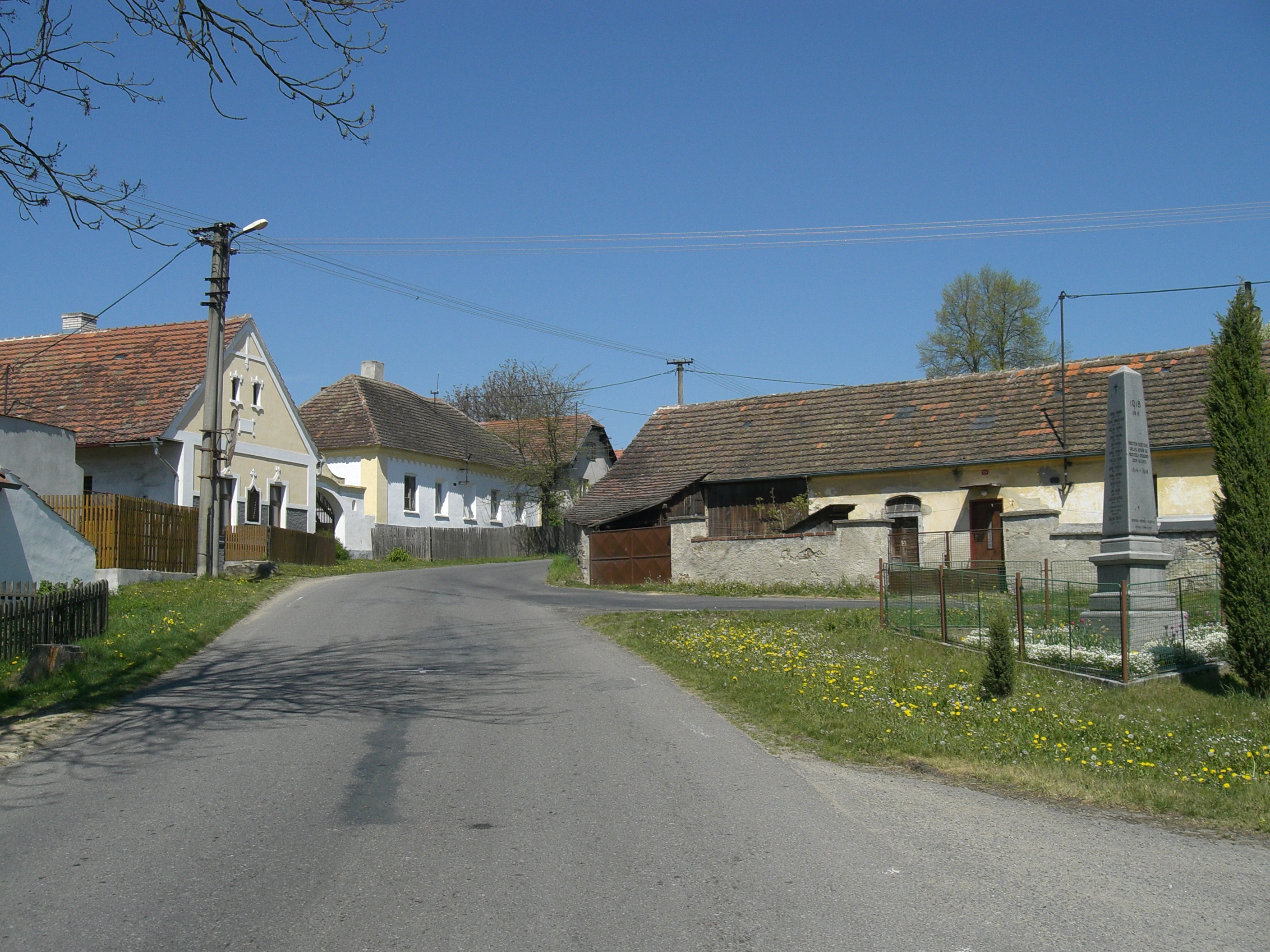
- Centre of Vlastec

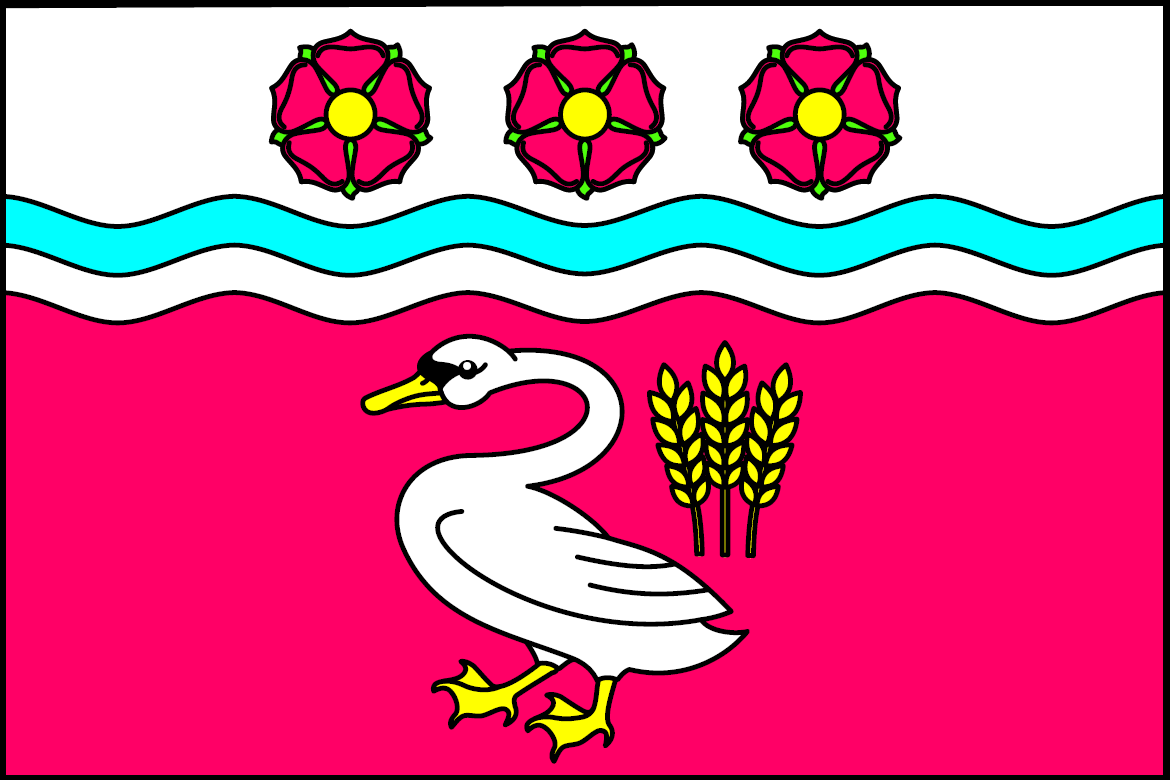
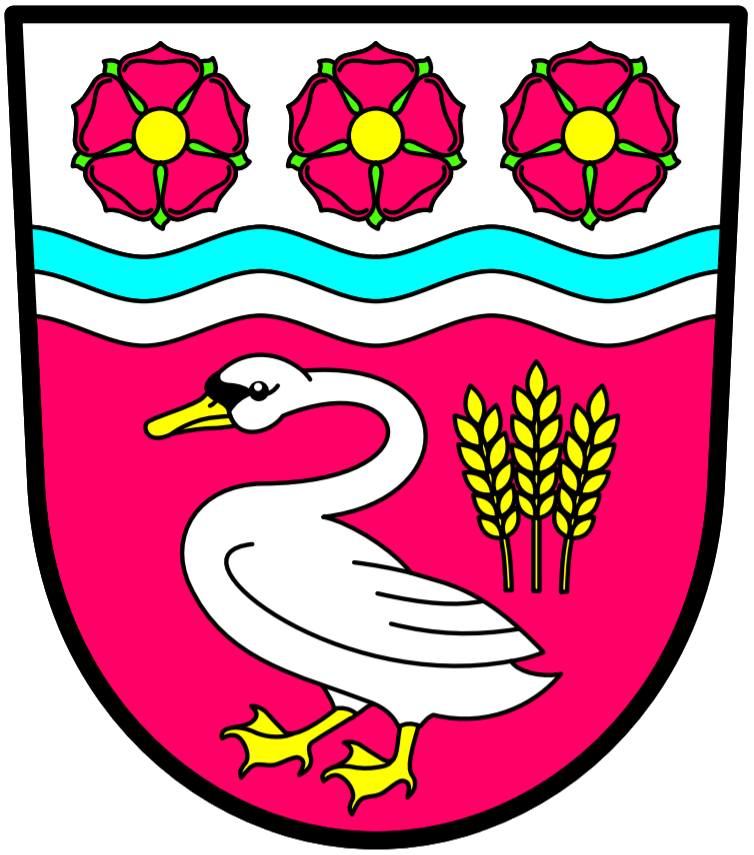
- Flag Coat of arms

- Location in the Czech Republic
- Coordinates: 49°21′56″N 14°12′42″E
- Country: Czech Republic
- Region: South Bohemian
- District: Písek
- First mentioned: 1323

Area
  - Total: 7.51 km^{2} (2.90 sq mi)
- Elevation: 437 m (1,434 ft)

Population (2026-01-01)
  - Total: 238
  - Density: 31.7/km^{2} (82.1/sq mi)
- Time zone: UTC+1 (CET)
  - Summer (DST): UTC+2 (CEST)
- Postal code: 397 01
- Website: www.vlastec.cz

Vlastec is a municipality and village in Písek District in the South Bohemian Region of the Czech Republic. It has about 200 inhabitants.

Vlastec lies approximately 10 kilometres (6 mi) north-east of Písek, 48 km (30 mi) north-west of České Budějovice, and 82 km (51 mi) south of Prague.

== Administrative division ==
Vlastec consists of three municipal parts (in brackets population according to the 2021 census):

- Vlastec (167)
- Červený Újezdec (39)
- Struhy (18)

== Demographics ==
Historical population
Year	Pop.	±%
1869	555	—
1880	562	+1.3%
1890	520	−7.5%
1900	566	+8.8%
1910	532	−6.0%
1921	501	−5.8%
1930	489	−2.4%
1950	348	−28.8%
1961	402	+15.5%
1970	315	−21.6%
1980	288	−8.6%
1991	229	−20.5%
2001	180	−21.4%
2011	179	−0.6%
2021	224	+25.1%
Source: Censuses
