= Tálín =

- Municipality
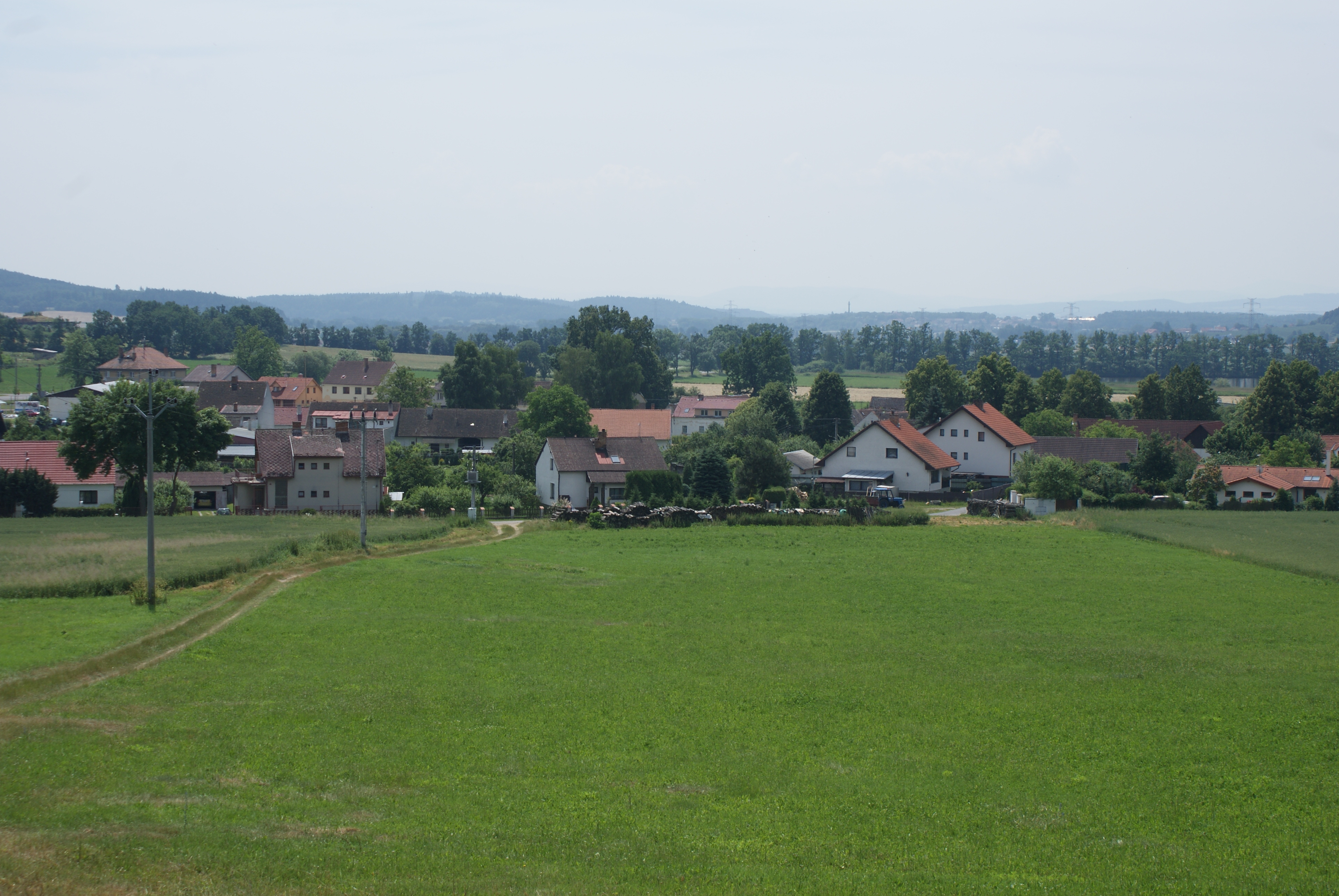
- General view

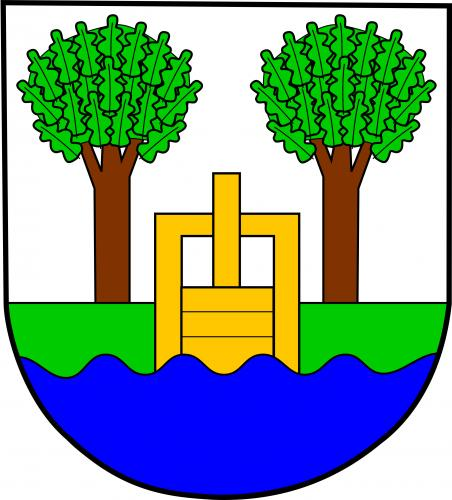
- Flag Coat of arms

- Location in the Czech Republic
- Coordinates: 49°14′51″N 14°13′38″E
- Country: Czech Republic
- Region: South Bohemian
- District: Písek
- First mentioned: 1253

Area
  - Total: 4.19 km^{2} (1.62 sq mi)
- Elevation: 393 m (1,289 ft)

Population (2026-01-01)
  - Total: 172
  - Density: 41.1/km^{2} (106/sq mi)
- Time zone: UTC+1 (CET)
  - Summer (DST): UTC+2 (CEST)
- Postal codes: 398 11, 398 15
- Website: www.talin.cz

Tálín (German: Talin) is a municipality and village in Písek District in the South Bohemian Region of the Czech Republic. It has about 200 inhabitants.

Tálín lies approximately 9 kilometres (6 mi) south-east of Písek, 36 km (22 mi) north-west of České Budějovice, and 95 km (59 mi) south of Prague.

== Administrative division ==
Tálín consists of two municipal parts (in brackets population according to the 2021 census):

- Tálín (133)
- Kukle (29)

== Demographics ==
Historical population
Year	Pop.	±%
1869	349	—
1880	342	−2.0%
1890	309	−9.6%
1900	440	+42.4%
1910	372	−15.5%
1921	306	−17.7%
1930	416	+35.9%
1950	264	−36.5%
1961	319	+20.8%
1970	249	−21.9%
1980	202	−18.9%
1991	177	−12.4%
2001	154	−13.0%
2011	167	+8.4%
2021	162	−3.0%
Source: Censuses
