= Veselíčko (Písek District) =

- Municipality
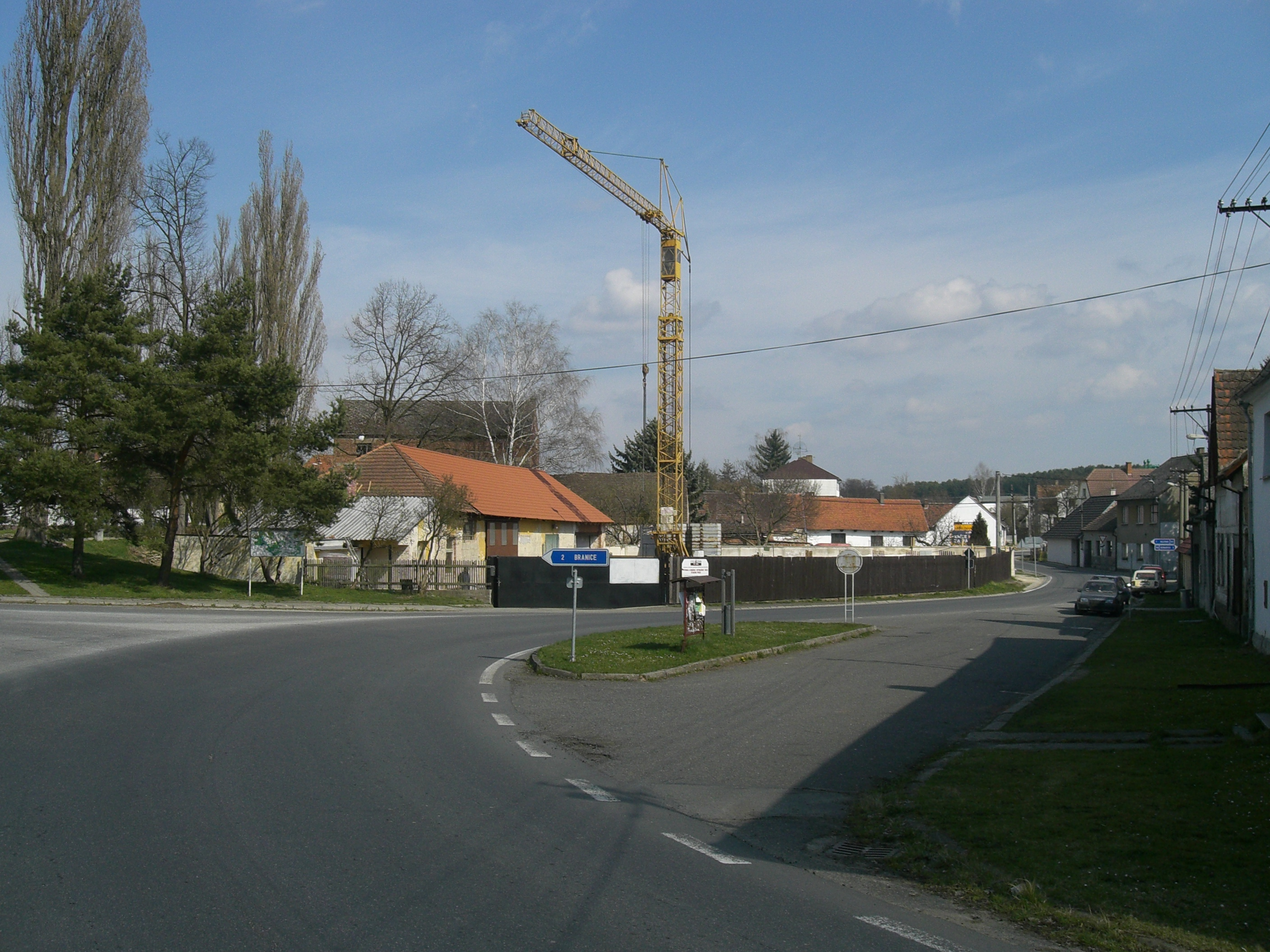
- Centre of Veselíčko

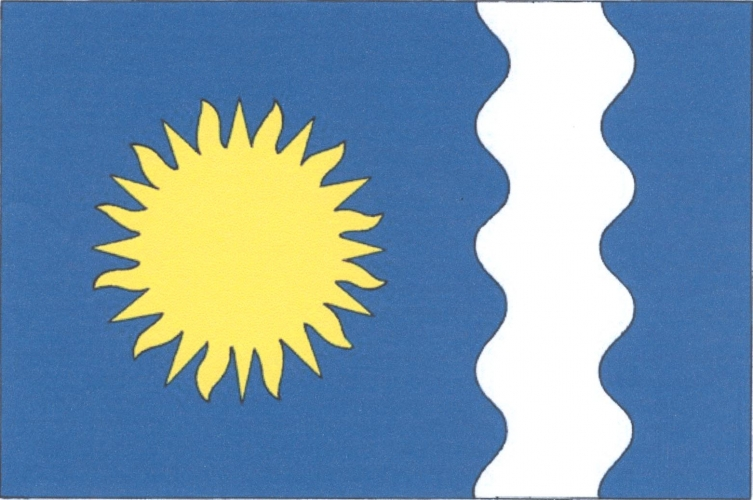
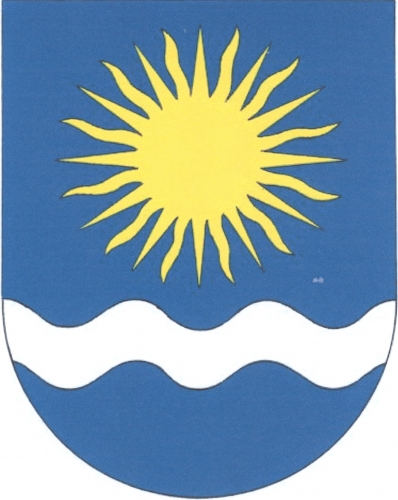
- Flag Coat of arms

- Location in the Czech Republic
- Coordinates: 49°23′17″N 14°21′24″E
- Country: Czech Republic
- Region: South Bohemian
- District: Písek
- First mentioned: 1488

Area
  - Total: 4.51 km^{2} (1.74 sq mi)
- Elevation: 465 m (1,526 ft)

Population (2026-01-01)
  - Total: 204
  - Density: 45.2/km^{2} (117/sq mi)
- Time zone: UTC+1 (CET)
  - Summer (DST): UTC+2 (CEST)
- Postal code: 398 43
- Website: www.obecveselicko.cz

Veselíčko is a municipality and village in Písek District in the South Bohemian Region of the Czech Republic. It has about 200 inhabitants.

Veselíčko lies approximately 19 kilometres (12 mi) north-east of Písek, 47 km (29 mi) north of České Budějovice, and 78 km (48 mi) south of Prague.

== Administrative division ==
Veselíčko consists of two municipal parts (in brackets population according to the 2021 census):

- Veselíčko (132)
- Bilina (69)

== Demographics ==
Historical population
Year	Pop.	±%
1869	724	—
1880	667	−7.9%
1890	578	−13.3%
1900	538	−6.9%
1910	565	+5.0%
1921	590	+4.4%
1930	537	−9.0%
1950	442	−17.7%
1961	425	−3.8%
1970	383	−9.9%
1980	289	−24.5%
1991	227	−21.5%
2001	205	−9.7%
2011	211	+2.9%
2021	201	−4.7%
Source: Censuses
