= Dolní Novosedly =

- Municipality
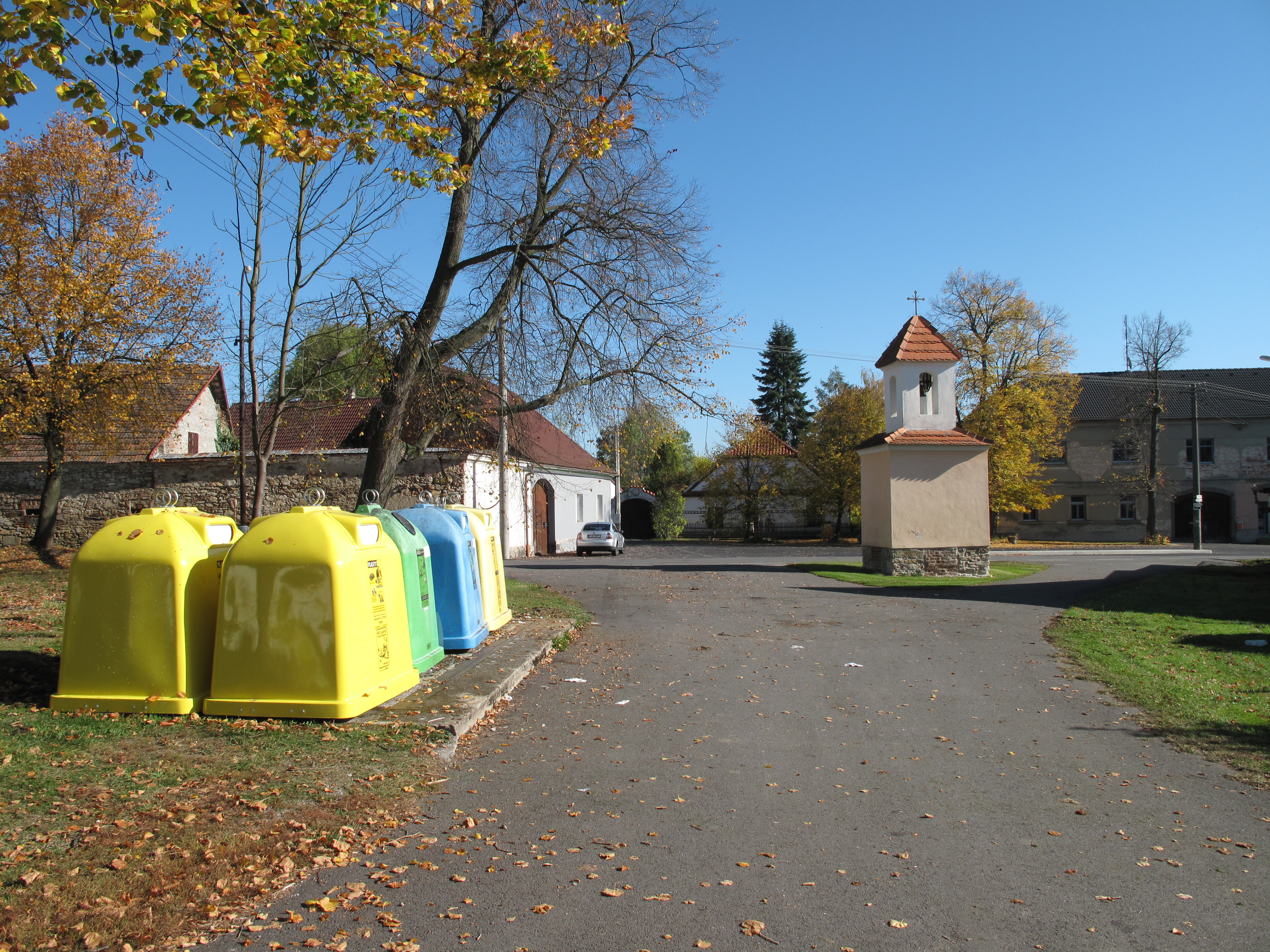
- Centre of Dolní Novosedly

- Location in the Czech Republic
- Coordinates: 49°19′45″N 14°11′46″E
- Country: Czech Republic
- Region: South Bohemian
- District: Písek
- First mentioned: 1517

Area
  - Total: 5.48 km^{2} (2.12 sq mi)
- Elevation: 486 m (1,594 ft)

Population (2026-01-01)
  - Total: 274
  - Density: 50.0/km^{2} (129/sq mi)
- Time zone: UTC+1 (CET)
  - Summer (DST): UTC+2 (CEST)
- Postal code: 397 01
- Website: www.dolni-novosedly.cz

Dolní Novosedly is a municipality and village in Písek District in the South Bohemian Region of the Czech Republic. It has about 300 inhabitants.

== Administrative division ==
Dolní Novosedly consists of three municipal parts (in brackets population according to the 2021 census):

- Dolní Novosedly (110)
- Chrastiny (26)
- Horní Novosedly (115)

== Etymology ==
The village was named after the people who were nově usedlí ('newly settled'). From the 19th century, the villages of Dolní Novosedly ('lower Novosedly') and Horní Novosedly ('upper Novosedly') are distinguished.

== Geography ==
Dolní Novosedly is located about 4 kilometres (2 mi) northeast of Písek and 43 km (27 mi) northwest of České Budějovice. It lies in the Tábor Uplands. The highest point is the hill Mláka at 548 m (1,798 ft) above sea level. The fishpond Podhorák is located in the municipality.

== History ==
The first written mention of Dolní Novosedly is from 1517.

== Demographics ==
Historical population

Year	Pop.	±%
1869	578	—
1880	607	+5.0%
1890	579	−4.6%
1900	631	+9.0%
1910	610	−3.3%

Year	Pop.	±%
1921	603	−1.1%
1930	554	−8.1%
1950	391	−29.4%
1961	395	+1.0%
1970	327	−17.2%

Year	Pop.	±%
1980	240	−26.6%
1991	205	−14.6%
2001	193	−5.9%
2011	210	+8.8%
2021	251	+19.5%

Source: Censuses

== Transport ==
The I/29 road from Písek to Tábor runs through the municipality.

== Sights ==
The only protected cultural monument in the municipality is a homestead, built in the first third of the 19th century at the latest. In the centre of Dolní Novosedly is a chapel from the 19th century.
