= Žďár (Písek District) =

- Municipality
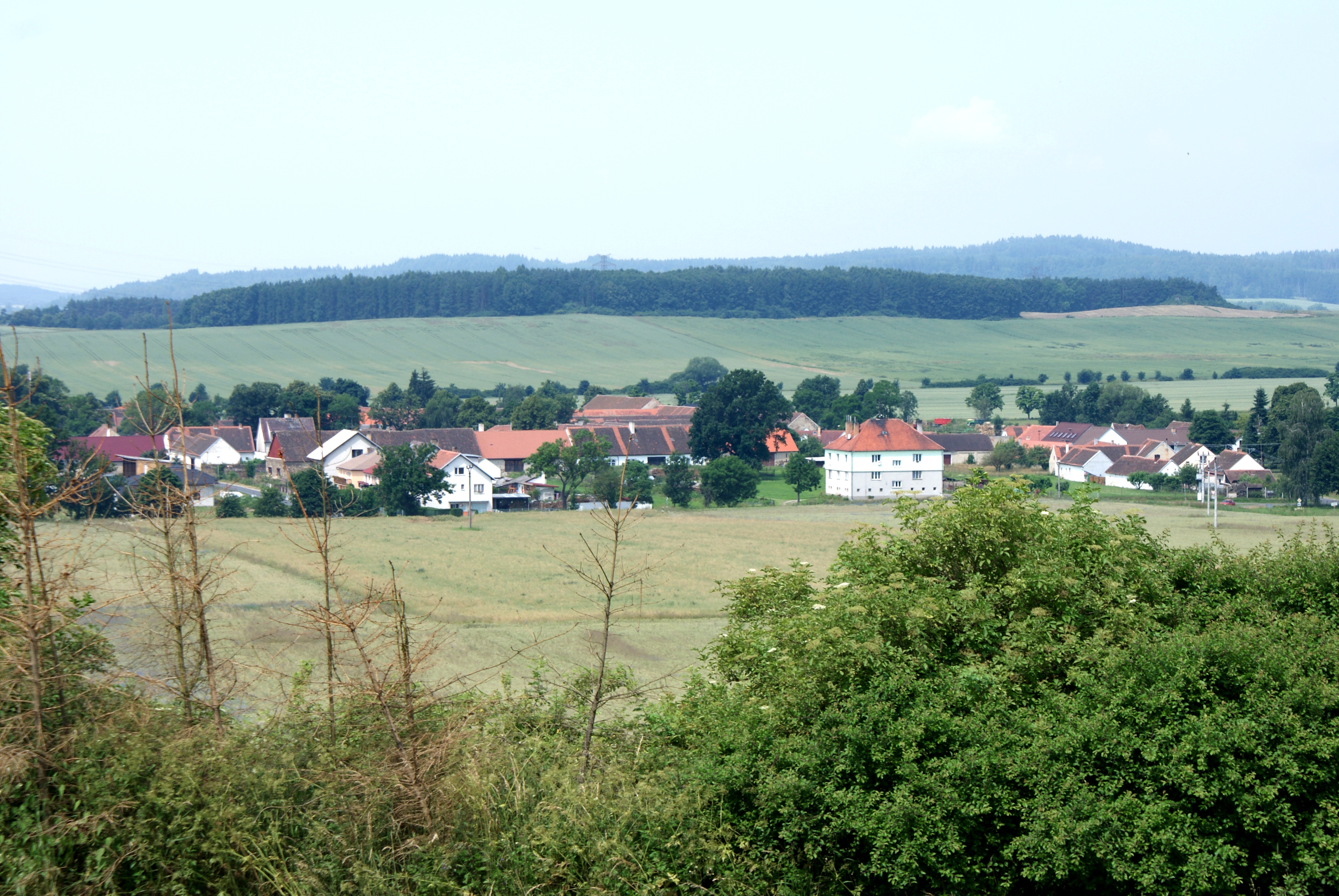
- General view

- Location in the Czech Republic
- Coordinates: 49°14′0″N 14°13′40″E
- Country: Czech Republic
- Region: South Bohemian
- District: Písek
- First mentioned: 1460

Area
  - Total: 15.97 km^{2} (6.17 sq mi)
- Elevation: 374 m (1,227 ft)

Population (2026-01-01)
  - Total: 254
  - Density: 15.9/km^{2} (41.2/sq mi)
- Time zone: UTC+1 (CET)
  - Summer (DST): UTC+2 (CEST)
- Postal code: 398 11
- Website: www.obeczdar.cz

Žďár is a municipality and village in Písek District in the South Bohemian Region of the Czech Republic. It has about 300 inhabitants.

Žďár lies approximately 11 kilometres (7 mi) south-east of Písek, 34 km (21 mi) north-west of České Budějovice, and 96 km (60 mi) south of Prague.

== Administrative division ==
Žďár consists of three municipal parts (in brackets population according to the 2021 census):

- Žďár (155)
- Nová Ves u Protivína (22)
- Žďárské Chalupy (72)

== Demographics ==
Historical population
Year	Pop.	±%
1869	857	—
1880	887	+3.5%
1890	825	−7.0%
1900	828	+0.4%
1910	887	+7.1%
1921	817	−7.9%
1930	698	−14.6%
1950	490	−29.8%
1961	454	−7.3%
1970	400	−11.9%
1980	305	−23.8%
1991	242	−20.7%
2001	228	−5.8%
2011	242	+6.1%
2021	249	+2.9%
Source: Censuses
