= Zbelítov =

- Municipality
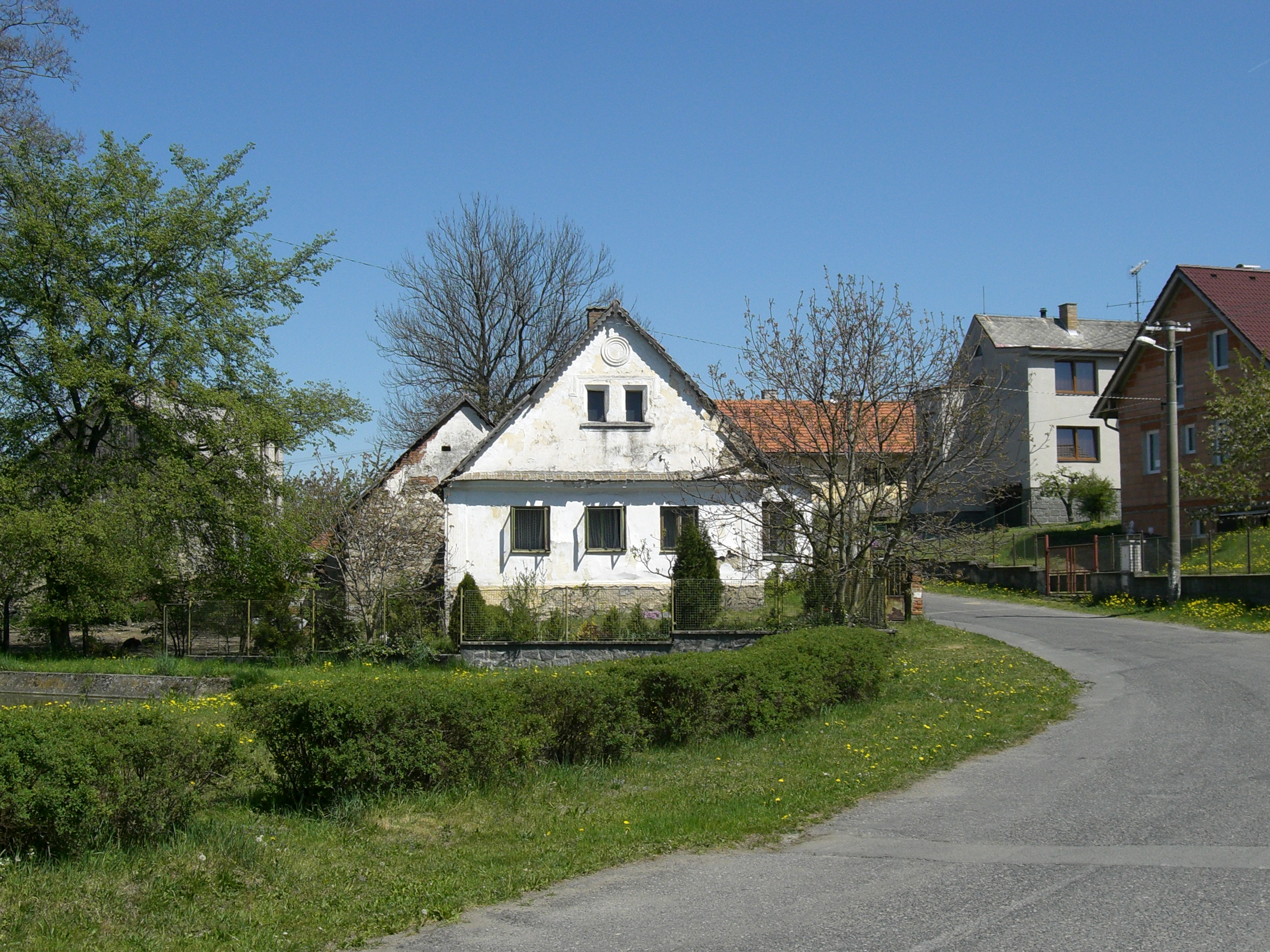
- Houses in Zbelítov

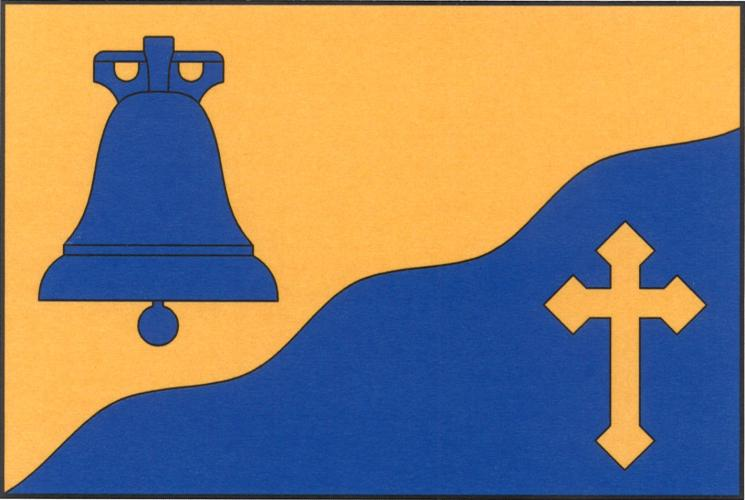
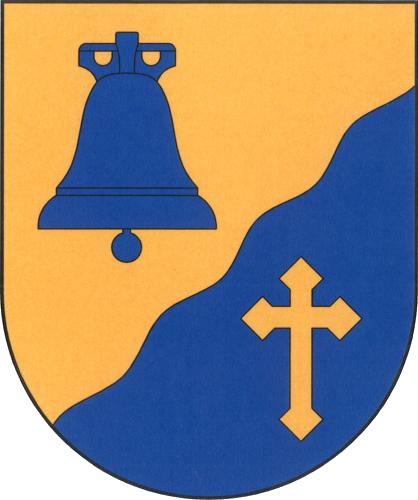
- Flag Coat of arms

- Location in the Czech Republic
- Coordinates: 49°27′24″N 14°19′45″E
- Country: Czech Republic
- Region: South Bohemian
- District: Písek
- First mentioned: 1379

Area
  - Total: 3.00 km^{2} (1.16 sq mi)
- Elevation: 488 m (1,601 ft)

Population (2026-01-01)
  - Total: 323
  - Density: 108/km^{2} (279/sq mi)
- Time zone: UTC+1 (CET)
  - Summer (DST): UTC+2 (CEST)
- Postal code: 399 01
- Website: www.zbelitov.cz

Zbelítov is a municipality and village in Písek District in the South Bohemian Region of the Czech Republic. It has about 300 inhabitants.

Zbelítov lies approximately 23 kilometres (14 mi) north-east of Písek, 55 km (34 mi) north of České Budějovice, and 71 km (44 mi) south of Prague.

== Demographics ==
Historical population
| Year | Pop. | ±% |
|---|---|---|
| 1869 | 275 | — |
| 1880 | 249 | −9.5% |
| 1890 | 227 | −8.8% |
| 1900 | 212 | −6.6% |
| 1910 | 213 | +0.5% |
| 1921 | 228 | +7.0% |
| 1930 | 244 | +7.0% |
| 1950 | 224 | −8.2% |
| 1961 | 232 | +3.6% |
| 1970 | 219 | −5.6% |
| 1980 | 343 | +56.6% |
| 1991 | 339 | −1.2% |
| 2001 | 346 | +2.1% |
| 2011 | 344 | −0.6% |
| 2021 | 321 | −6.7% |
Source: Censuses
