= Jickovice =

- Municipality
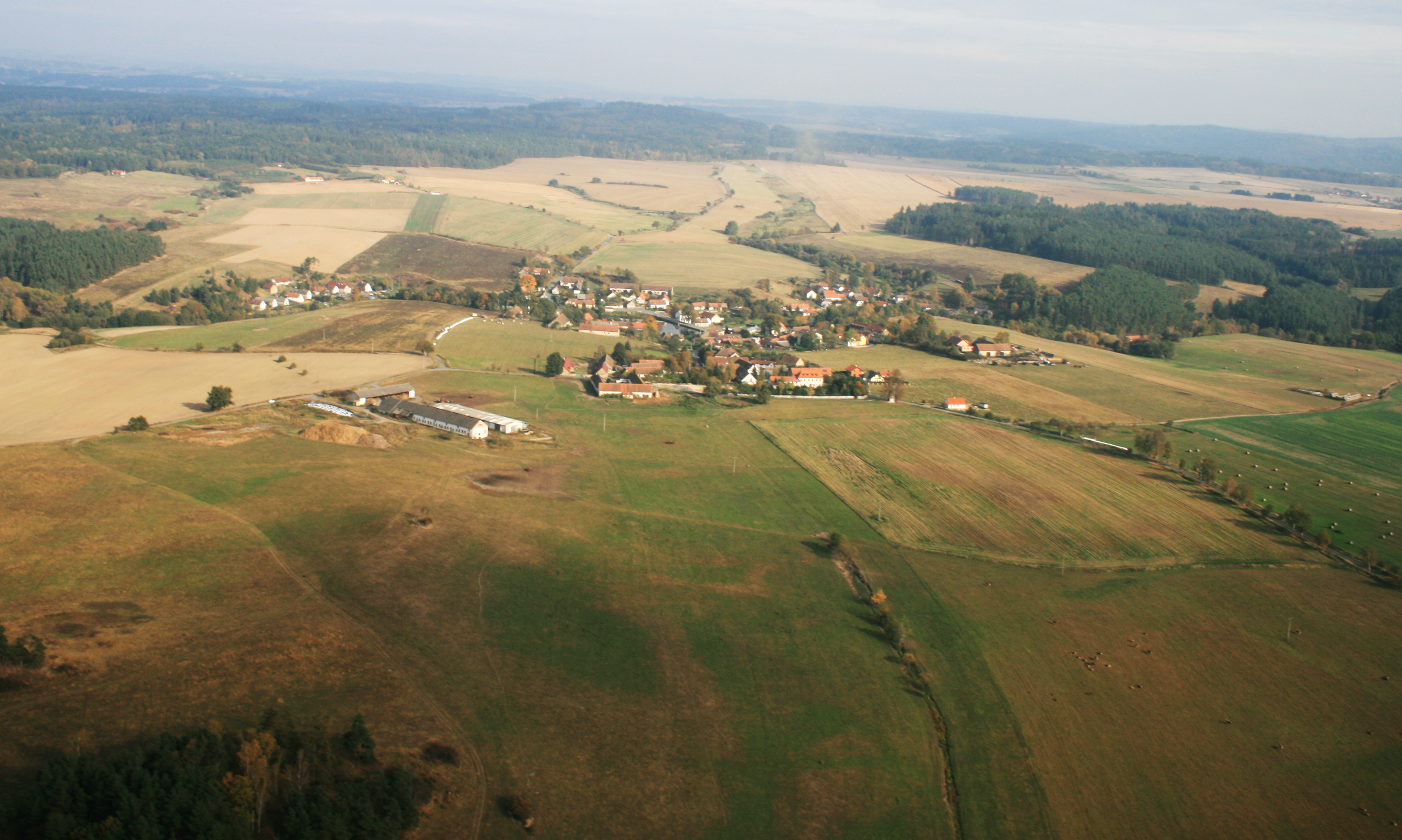
- Aerial view

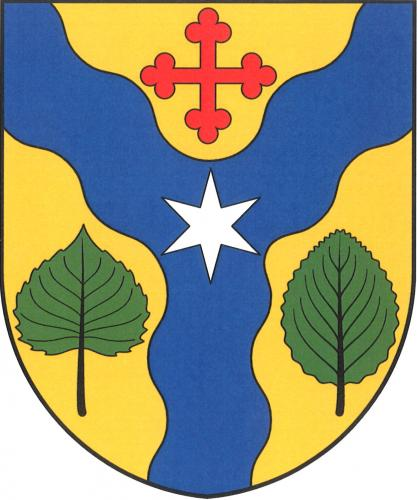
- Flag Coat of arms

- Location in the Czech Republic
- Coordinates: 49°27′3″N 14°12′57″E
- Country: Czech Republic
- Region: South Bohemian
- District: Písek
- First mentioned: 1220

Area
  - Total: 11.32 km^{2} (4.37 sq mi)
- Elevation: 414 m (1,358 ft)

Population (2026-01-01)
  - Total: 136
  - Density: 12.0/km^{2} (31.1/sq mi)
- Time zone: UTC+1 (CET)
  - Summer (DST): UTC+2 (CEST)
- Postal code: 399 01
- Website: www.jickovice.cz

Jickovice is a municipality and village in Písek District in the South Bohemian Region of the Czech Republic. It has about 100 inhabitants.

Jickovice lies approximately 18 kilometres (11 mi) north of Písek, 57 km (35 mi) north of České Budějovice, and 73 km (45 mi) south of Prague.

== Administrative division ==
Jickovice consists of two municipal parts (in brackets population according to the 2021 census):

- Jickovice (93)
- Varta (14)

== Demographics ==
Historical population
Year	Pop.	±%
1869	564	—
1880	520	−7.8%
1890	512	−1.5%
1900	519	+1.4%
1910	527	+1.5%
1921	502	−4.7%
1930	422	−15.9%
1950	300	−28.9%
1961	281	−6.3%
1970	227	−19.2%
1980	173	−23.8%
1991	135	−22.0%
2001	98	−27.4%
2011	98	+0.0%
2021	107	+9.2%
Source: Censuses
