= Boudy =

- Municipality
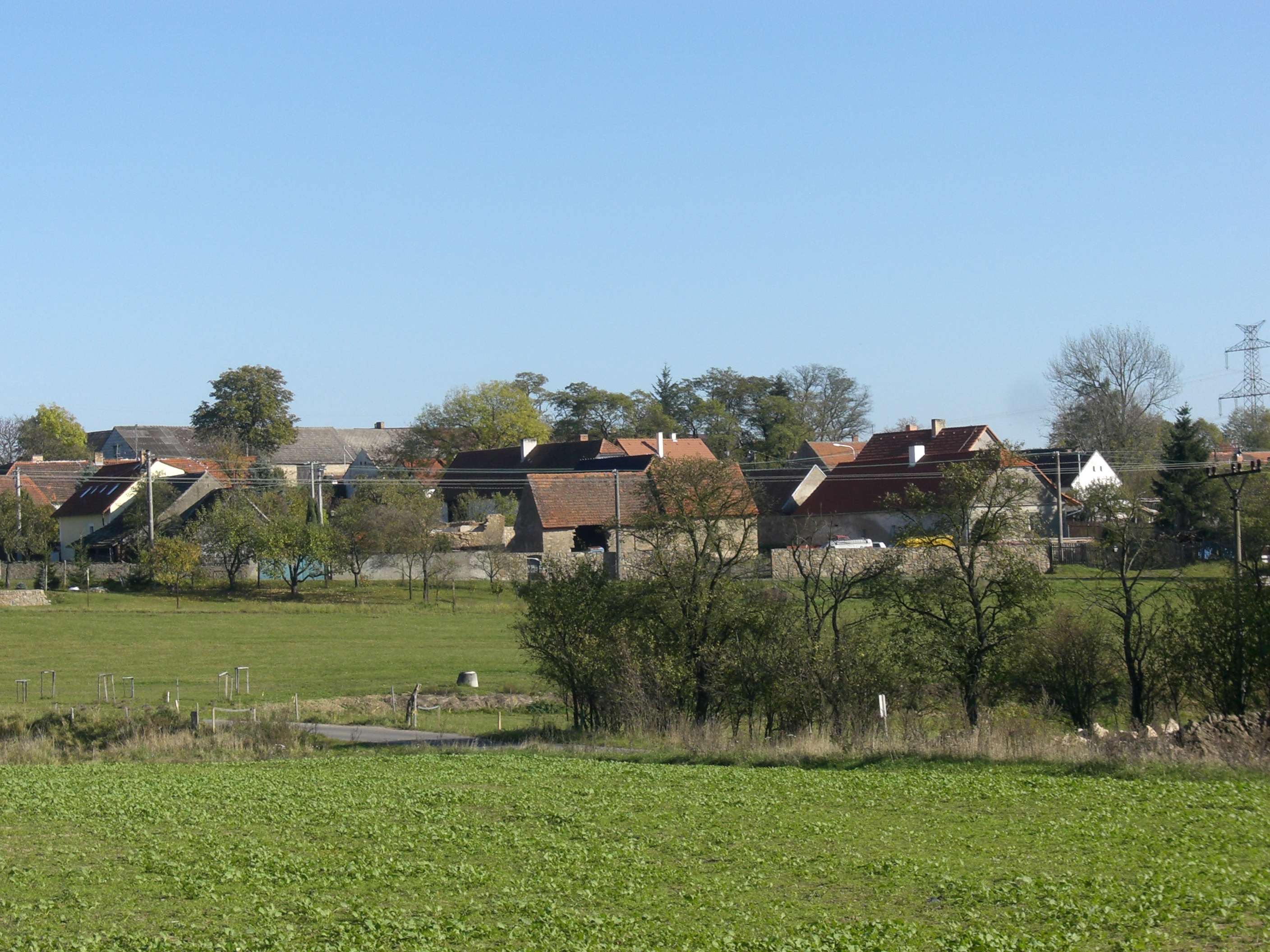
- Houses in the central part of Boudy

- Location in the Czech Republic
- Coordinates: 49°26′53″N 14°2′8″E
- Country: Czech Republic
- Region: South Bohemian
- District: Písek
- First mentioned: 1649

Area
  - Total: 10.01 km^{2} (3.86 sq mi)
- Elevation: 475 m (1,558 ft)

Population (2026-01-01)
  - Total: 212
  - Density: 21.2/km^{2} (54.9/sq mi)
- Time zone: UTC+1 (CET)
  - Summer (DST): UTC+2 (CEST)
- Postal code: 398 04
- Website: www.obecboudy.cz

Boudy is a municipality and village in Písek District in the South Bohemian Region of the Czech Republic. It has about 200 inhabitants.

Boudy lies approximately 18 kilometres (11 mi) north-west of Písek, 62 km (39 mi) north-west of České Budějovice, and 77 km (48 mi) south of Prague.

== Demographics ==
Historical population
| Year | Pop. | ±% |
|---|---|---|
| 1869 | 583 | — |
| 1880 | 610 | +4.6% |
| 1890 | 547 | −10.3% |
| 1900 | 554 | +1.3% |
| 1910 | 504 | −9.0% |
| 1921 | 467 | −7.3% |
| 1930 | 408 | −12.6% |
| 1950 | 342 | −16.2% |
| 1961 | 301 | −12.0% |
| 1970 | 246 | −18.3% |
| 1980 | 232 | −5.7% |
| 1991 | 207 | −10.8% |
| 2001 | 180 | −13.0% |
| 2011 | 191 | +6.1% |
| 2021 | 215 | +12.6% |
Source: Censuses
