= Božetice =

- Municipality
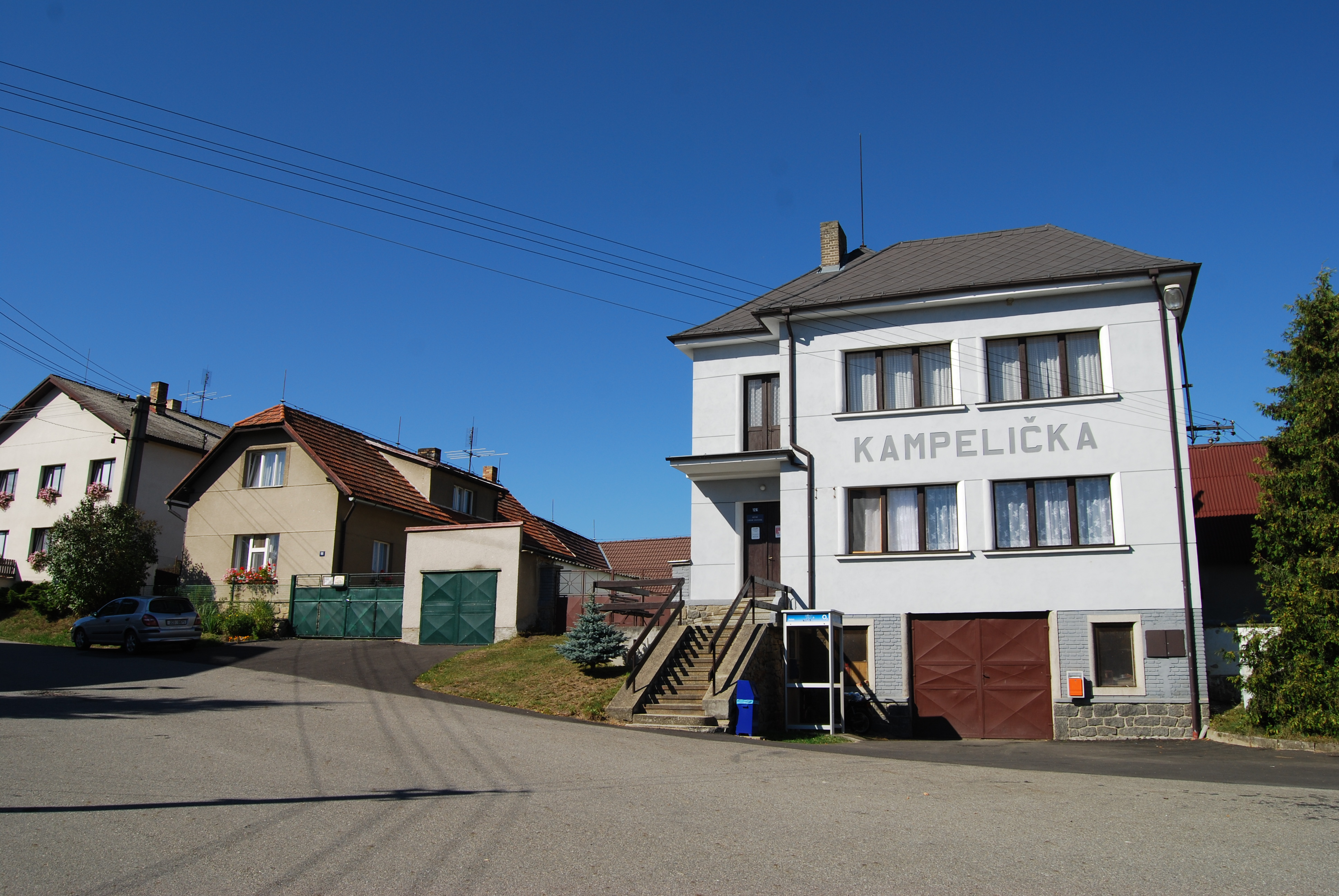
- Centre of Božetice

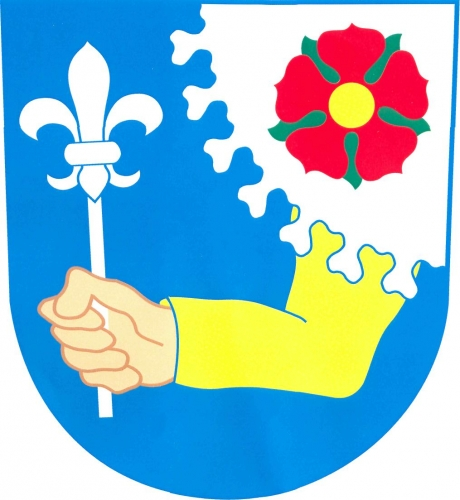
- Flag Coat of arms

- Location in the Czech Republic
- Coordinates: 49°27′4″N 14°26′38″E
- Country: Czech Republic
- Region: South Bohemian
- District: Písek
- First mentioned: 1291

Area
  - Total: 13.63 km^{2} (5.26 sq mi)
- Elevation: 442 m (1,450 ft)

Population (2026-01-01)
  - Total: 353
  - Density: 25.9/km^{2} (67.1/sq mi)
- Time zone: UTC+1 (CET)
  - Summer (DST): UTC+2 (CEST)
- Postal code: 398 51
- Website: www.bozetice.cz

Božetice is a municipality and village in Písek District in the South Bohemian Region of the Czech Republic. It has about 400 inhabitants.

Božetice lies approximately 29 kilometres (18 mi) north-east of Písek, 53 km (33 mi) north of České Budějovice, and 71 km (44 mi) south of Prague.

== Administrative division ==
Božetice consists of two municipal parts (in brackets population according to the 2021 census):

- Božetice (321)
- Radihošť (11)

== Demographics ==
Historical population
Year	Pop.	±%
1869	762	—
1880	761	−0.1%
1890	756	−0.7%
1900	702	−7.1%
1910	678	−3.4%
1921	718	+5.9%
1930	676	−5.8%
1950	585	−13.5%
1961	497	−15.0%
1970	449	−9.7%
1980	406	−9.6%
1991	395	−2.7%
2001	398	+0.8%
2011	384	−3.5%
2021	332	−13.5%
Source: Censuses
