= Okrouhlá (Písek District) =

- Municipality
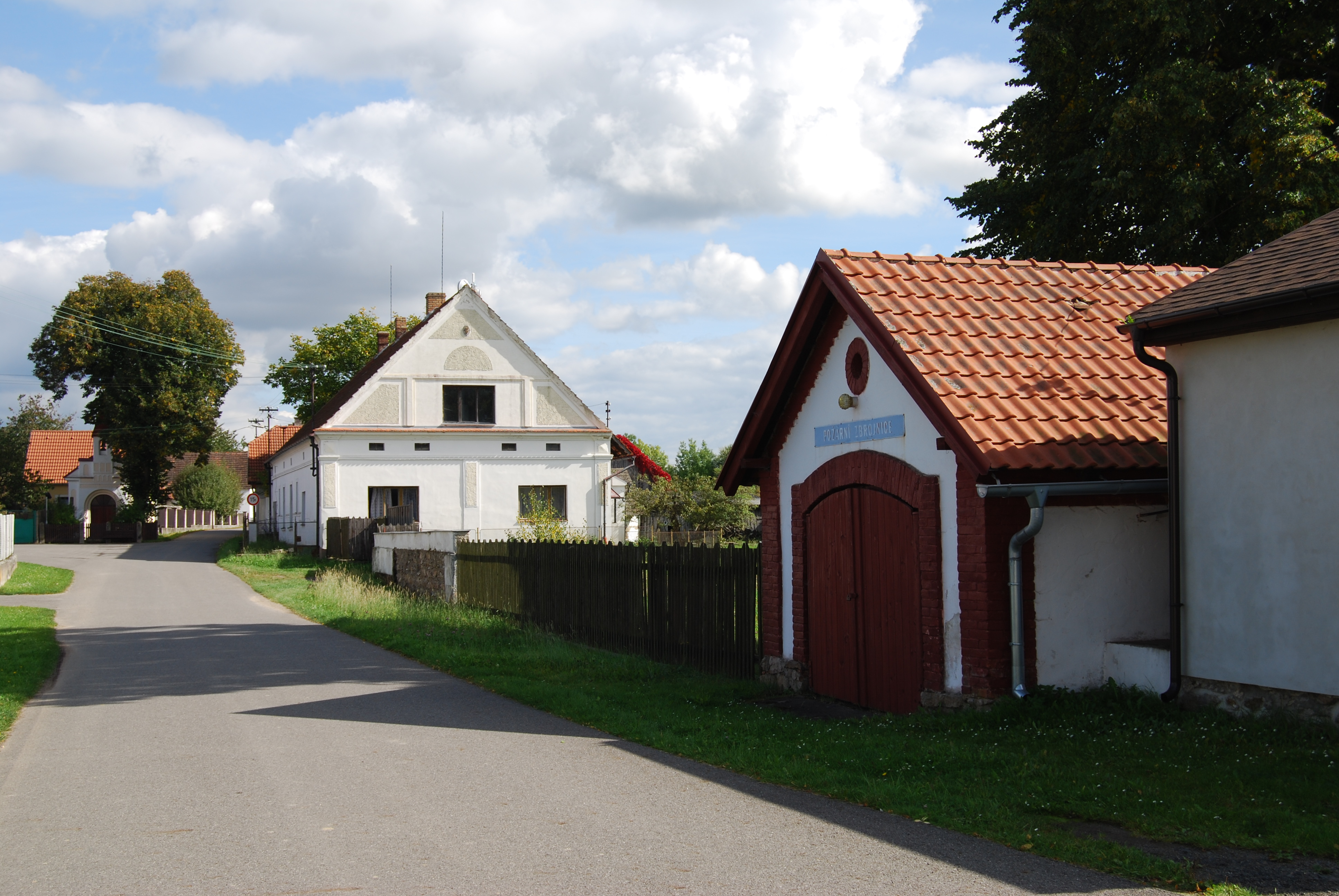
- Centre of Okrouhlá

- Location in the Czech Republic
- Coordinates: 49°24′49″N 14°21′52″E
- Country: Czech Republic
- Region: South Bohemian
- District: Písek
- First mentioned: 1488

Area
  - Total: 4.38 km^{2} (1.69 sq mi)
- Elevation: 499 m (1,637 ft)

Population (2026-01-01)
  - Total: 69
  - Density: 16/km^{2} (41/sq mi)
- Time zone: UTC+1 (CET)
  - Summer (DST): UTC+2 (CEST)
- Postal code: 398 43
- Website: www.okrouhla-jc.cz

Okrouhlá is a municipality and village in Písek District in the South Bohemian Region of the Czech Republic. It has about 70 inhabitants.

Okrouhlá lies approximately 21 kilometres (13 mi) north-east of Písek, 50 km (31 mi) north of České Budějovice, and 75 km (47 mi) south of Prague.

== Demographics ==
Historical population
Year	Pop.	±%
1869	166	—
1880	158	−4.8%
1890	152	−3.8%
1900	159	+4.6%
1910	181	+13.8%
1921	166	−8.3%
1930	162	−2.4%
1950	148	−8.6%
1961	140	−5.4%
1970	111	−20.7%
1980	86	−22.5%
1991	69	−19.8%
2001	63	−8.7%
2011	69	+9.5%
2021	62	−10.1%
Source: Censuses
