= Vrcovice =

- Municipality
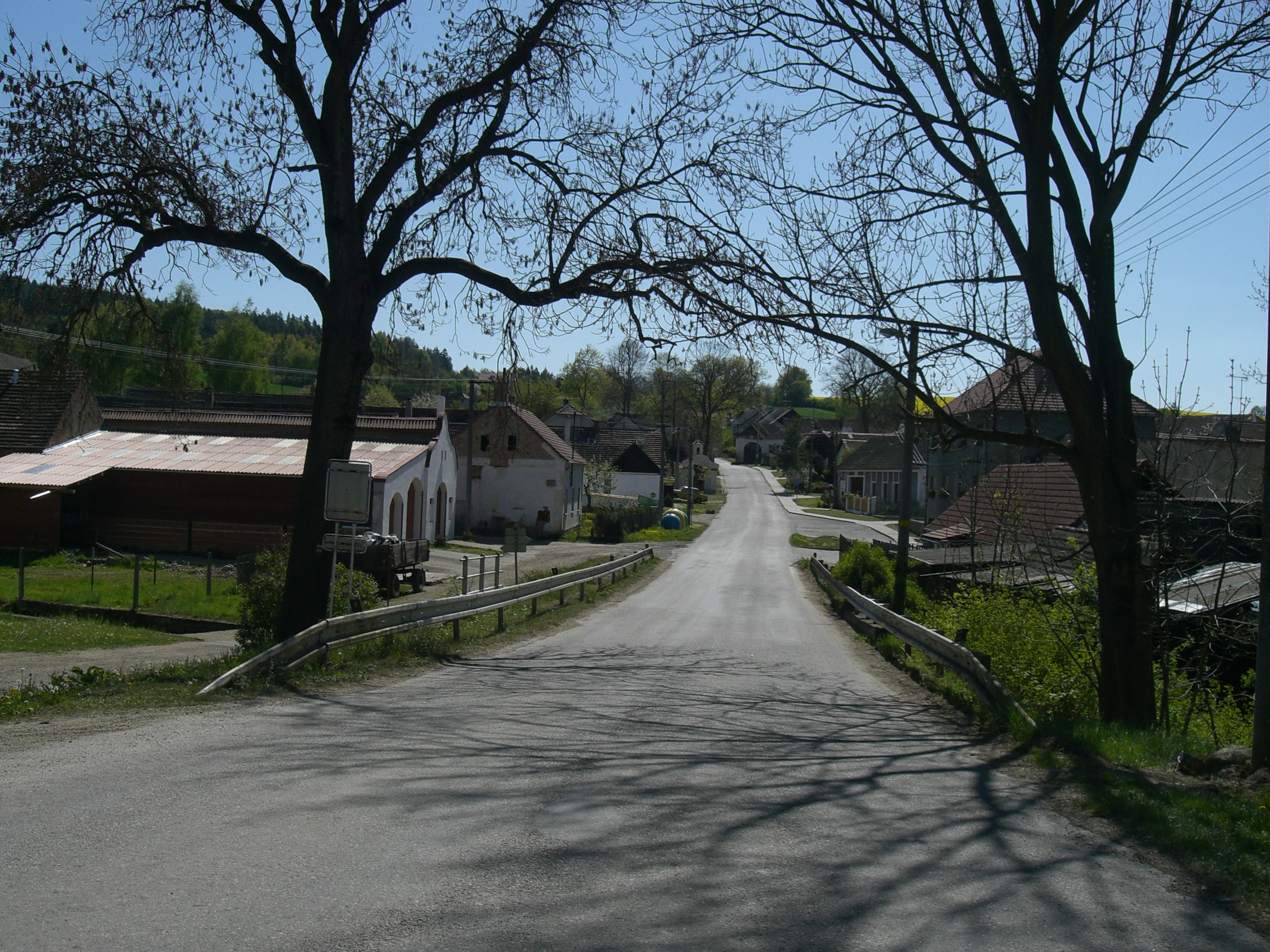
- Main street

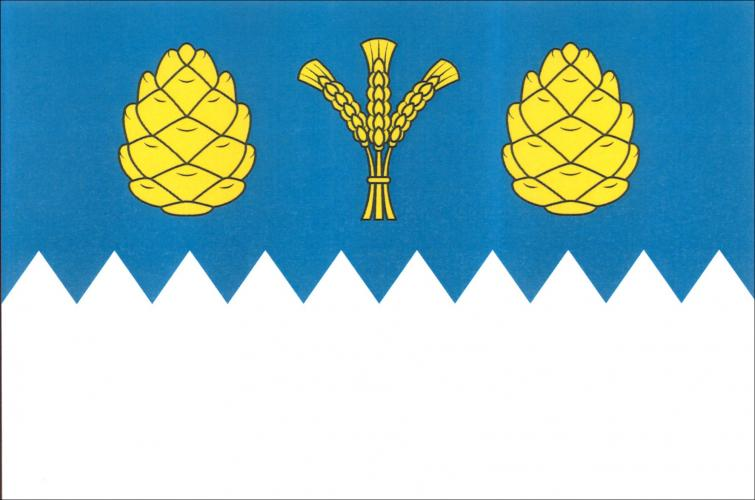
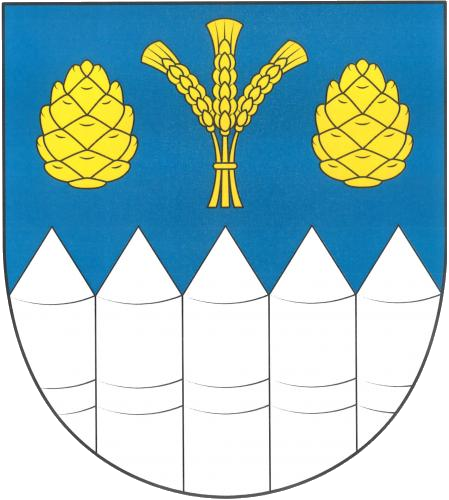
- Flag Coat of arms

- Location in the Czech Republic
- Coordinates: 49°20′41″N 14°10′28″E
- Country: Czech Republic
- Region: South Bohemian
- District: Písek
- First mentioned: 1542

Area
  - Total: 5.52 km^{2} (2.13 sq mi)
- Elevation: 418 m (1,371 ft)

Population (2026-01-01)
  - Total: 196
  - Density: 35.5/km^{2} (92.0/sq mi)
- Time zone: UTC+1 (CET)
  - Summer (DST): UTC+2 (CEST)
- Postal code: 397 01
- Website: www.vrcovice.cz

Vrcovice is a municipality and village in Písek District in the South Bohemian Region of the Czech Republic. It has about 200 inhabitants.

Vrcovice lies approximately 6 kilometres (4 mi) north-east of Písek, 47 km (29 mi) north-west of České Budějovice, and 85 km (53 mi) south of Prague.

== Demographics ==
Historical population
Year	Pop.	±%
1869	265	—
1880	270	+1.9%
1890	276	+2.2%
1900	242	−12.3%
1910	241	−0.4%
1921	249	+3.3%
1930	222	−10.8%
1950	185	−16.7%
1961	170	−8.1%
1970	149	−12.4%
1980	136	−8.7%
1991	105	−22.8%
2001	106	+1.0%
2011	179	+68.9%
2021	177	−1.1%
Source: Censuses
