= Přeštěnice =

- Municipality
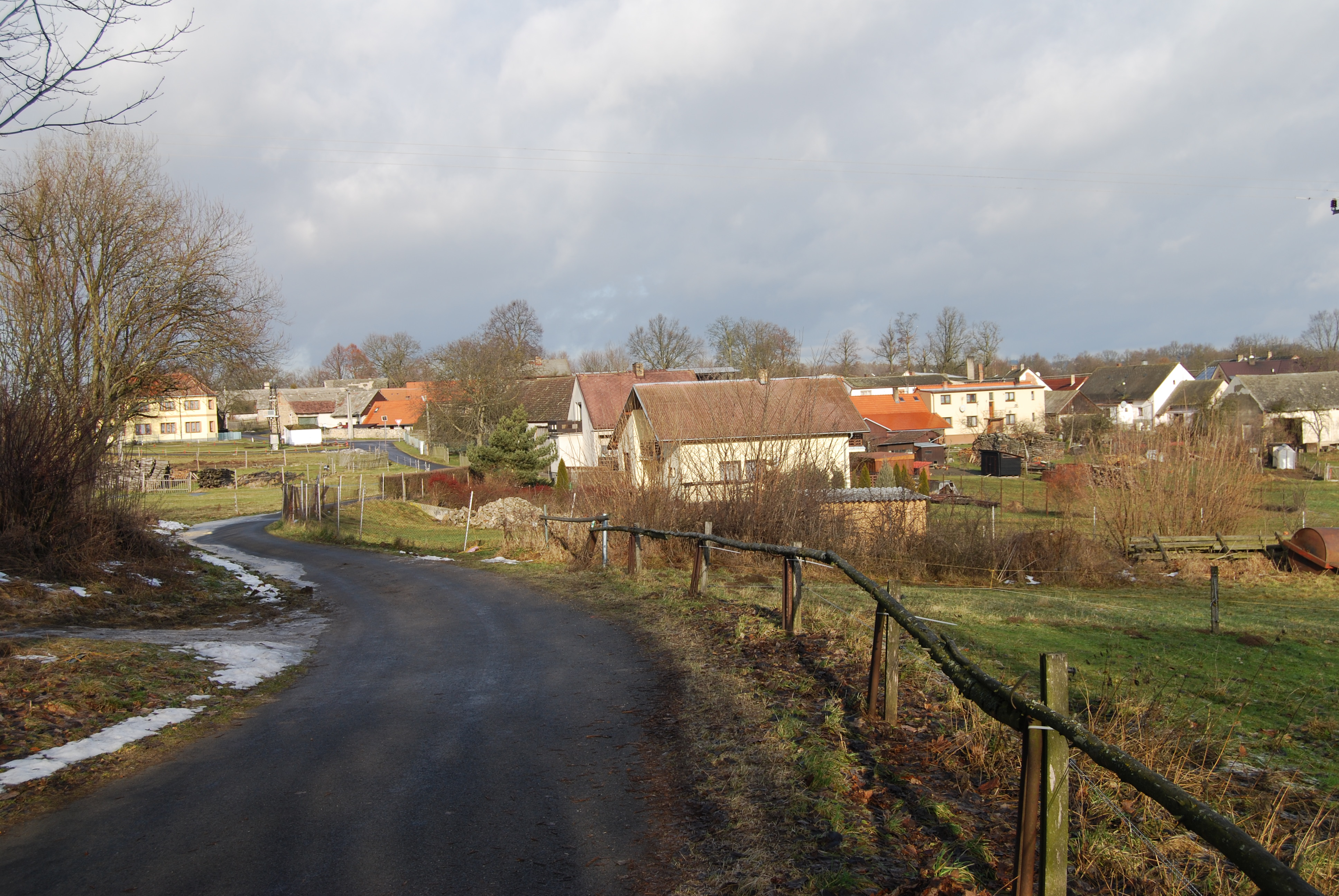
- View from the south

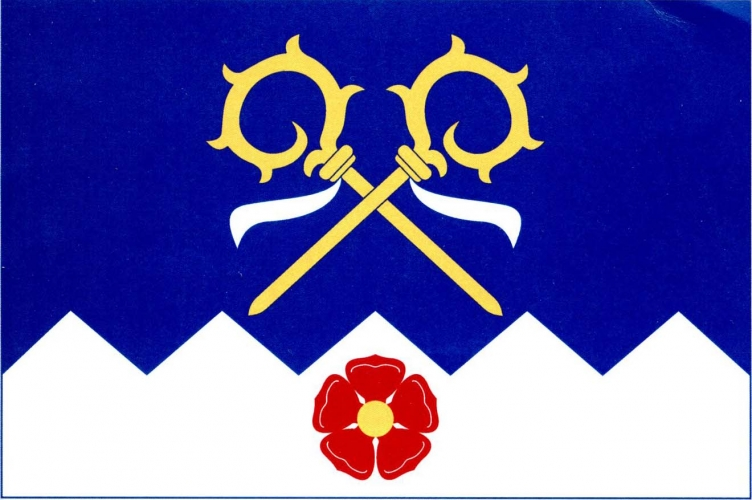
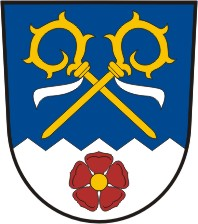
- Flag Coat of arms

- Location in the Czech Republic
- Coordinates: 49°28′47″N 14°25′13″E
- Country: Czech Republic
- Region: South Bohemian
- District: Písek
- First mentioned: 1379

Area
  - Total: 9.78 km^{2} (3.78 sq mi)
- Elevation: 568 m (1,864 ft)

Population (2026-01-01)
  - Total: 280
  - Density: 29/km^{2} (74/sq mi)
- Time zone: UTC+1 (CET)
  - Summer (DST): UTC+2 (CEST)
- Postal code: 399 01
- Website: www.ou-prestenice.cz

Přeštěnice is a municipality and village in Písek District in the South Bohemian Region of the Czech Republic. It has about 300 inhabitants.

Přeštěnice lies approximately 29 kilometres (18 mi) north-east of Písek, 57 km (35 mi) north of České Budějovice, and 68 km (42 mi) south of Prague.

== Administrative division ==
Přeštěnice consists of four municipal parts (in brackets population according to the 2021 census):

- Přeštěnice (159)
- Držkrajov (52)
- Mlčkov (15)
- Týnice (38)

== Demographics ==
Historical population
Year	Pop.	±%
1869	550	—
1880	558	+1.5%
1890	553	−0.9%
1900	517	−6.5%
1910	519	+0.4%
1921	528	+1.7%
1930	459	−13.1%
1950	355	−22.7%
1961	291	−18.0%
1970	285	−2.1%
1980	284	−0.4%
1991	310	+9.2%
2001	296	−4.5%
2011	273	−7.8%
2021	264	−3.3%
Source: Censuses
