= Slabčice =

- Municipality
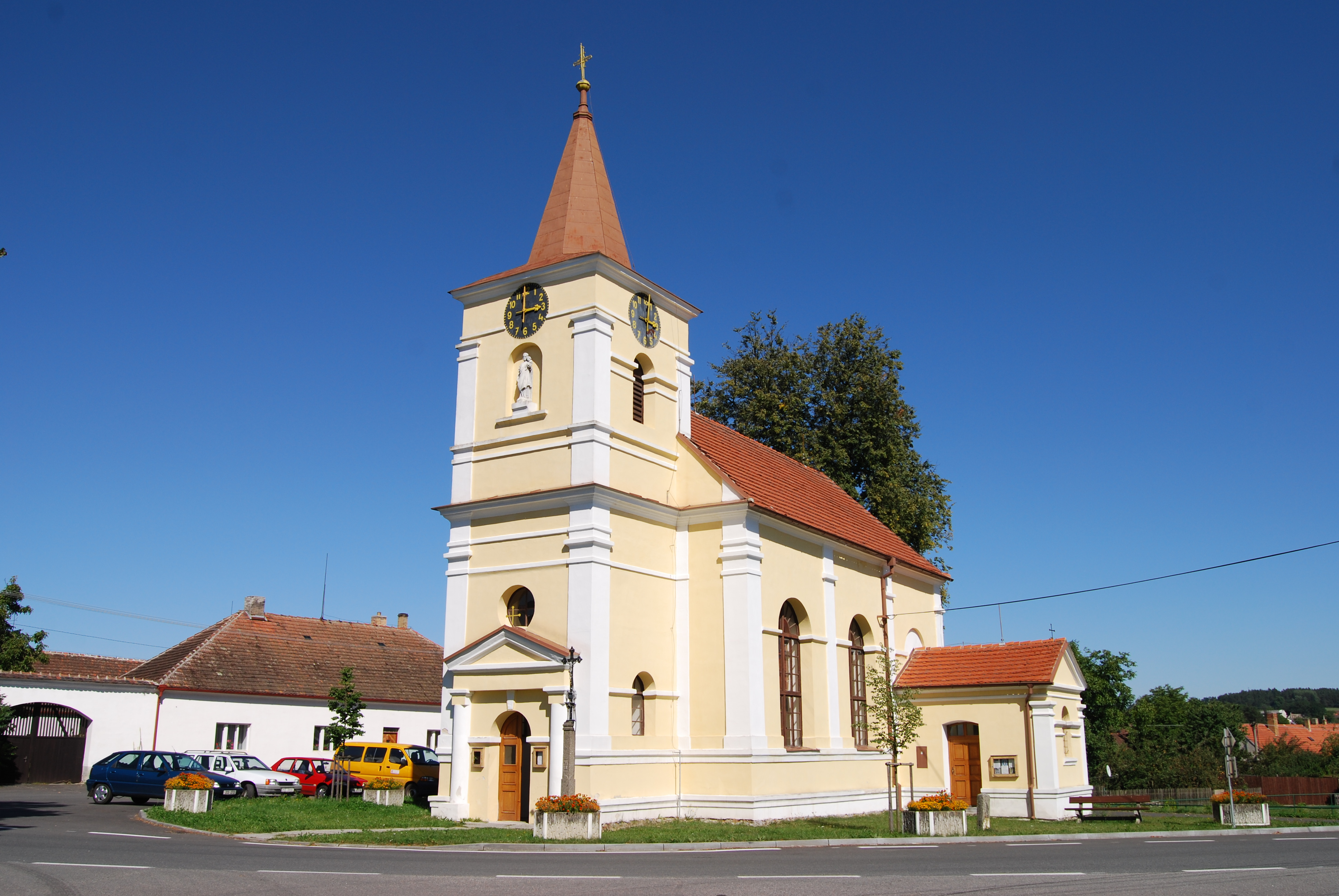
- Church of Saint Joseph

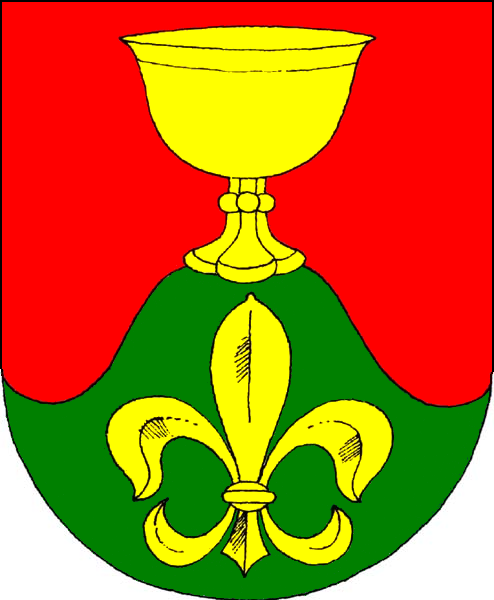
- Flag Coat of arms

- Location in the Czech Republic
- Coordinates: 49°19′36″N 14°20′16″E
- Country: Czech Republic
- Region: South Bohemian
- District: Písek
- First mentioned: 1379

Area
  - Total: 17.48 km^{2} (6.75 sq mi)
- Elevation: 439 m (1,440 ft)

Population (2026-01-01)
  - Total: 369
  - Density: 21.1/km^{2} (54.7/sq mi)
- Time zone: UTC+1 (CET)
  - Summer (DST): UTC+2 (CEST)
- Postal codes: 398 43, 398 47
- Website: www.slabcice.cz

Slabčice is a municipality and village in Písek District in the South Bohemian Region of the Czech Republic. It has about 400 inhabitants.

Slabčice lies approximately 16 kilometres (10 mi) east of Písek, 41 km (25 mi) north of České Budějovice, and 85 km (53 mi) south of Prague.

== Administrative division ==
Slabčice consists of four municipal parts (in brackets population according to the 2021 census):

- Slabčice (145)
- Březí (44)
- Nemějice (66)
- Písecká Smoleč (118)

== Demographics ==
Historical population
Year	Pop.	±%
1869	1,185	—
1880	1,138	−4.0%
1890	1,066	−6.3%
1900	1,025	−3.8%
1910	1,023	−0.2%
1921	1,036	+1.3%
1930	956	−7.7%
1950	693	−27.5%
1961	705	+1.7%
1970	613	−13.0%
1980	502	−18.1%
1991	404	−19.5%
2001	350	−13.4%
2011	321	−8.3%
2021	373	+16.2%
Source: Censuses
