= Křenovice (Písek District) =

- Municipality
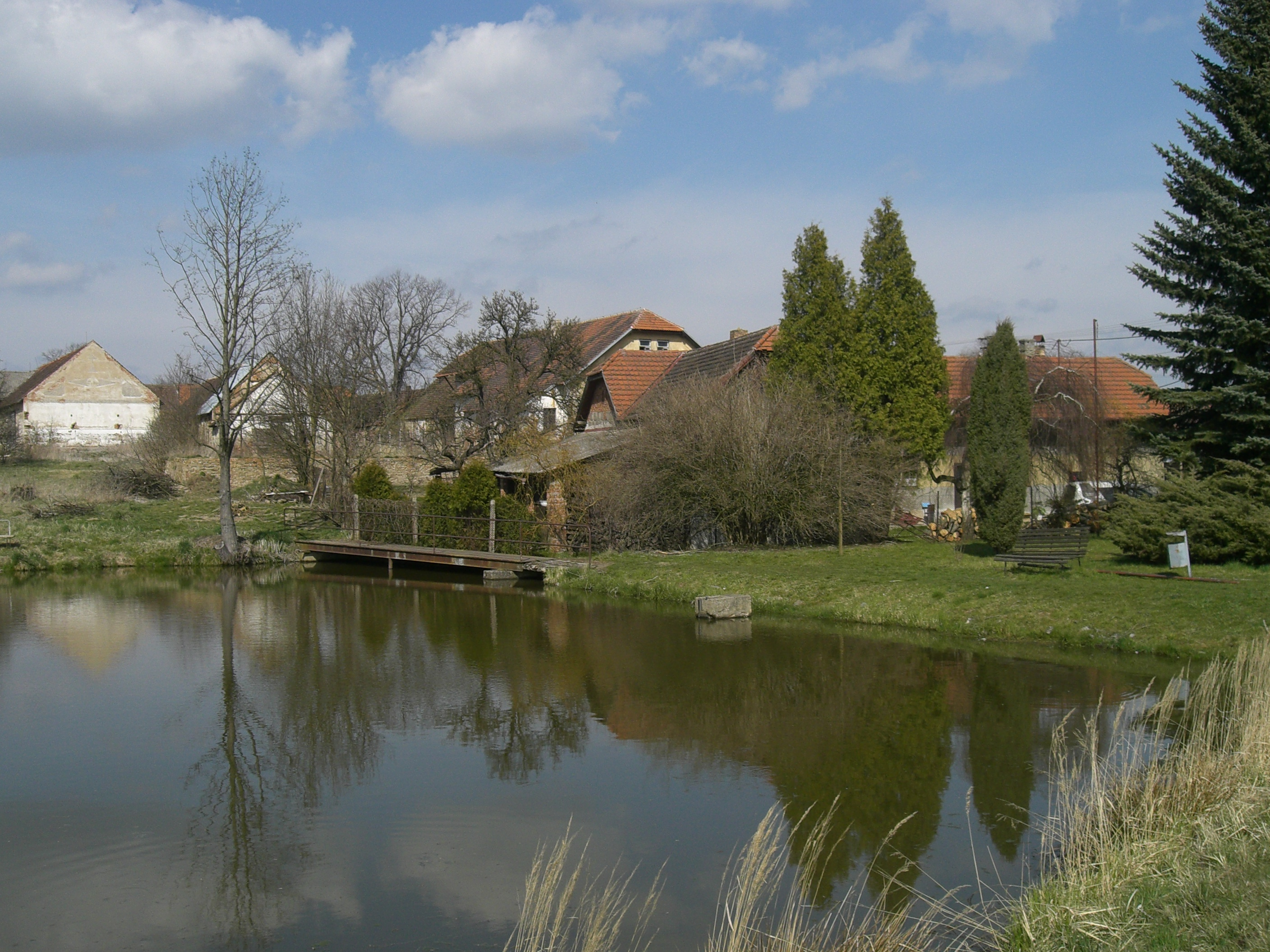
- A pond in Křenovice

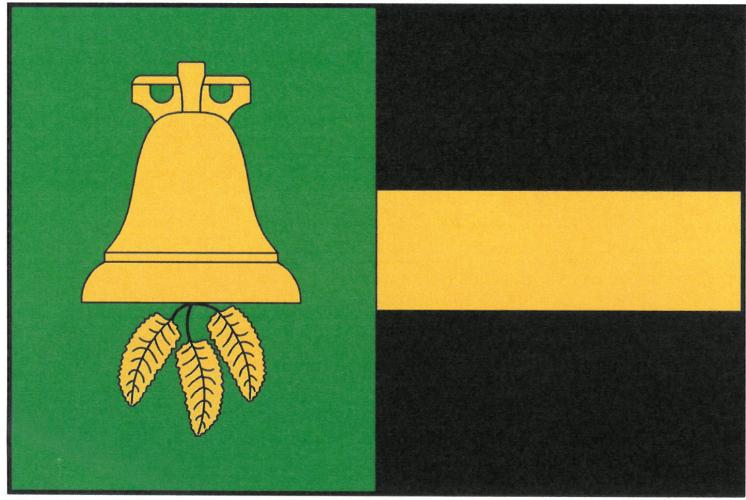
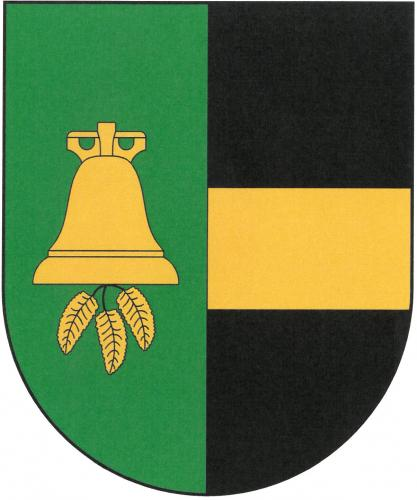
- Flag Coat of arms

- Location in the Czech Republic
- Coordinates: 49°22′3″N 14°20′35″E
- Country: Czech Republic
- Region: South Bohemian
- District: Písek
- First mentioned: 1379

Area
  - Total: 6.12 km^{2} (2.36 sq mi)
- Elevation: 478 m (1,568 ft)

Population (2026-01-01)
  - Total: 183
  - Density: 29.9/km^{2} (77.4/sq mi)
- Time zone: UTC+1 (CET)
  - Summer (DST): UTC+2 (CEST)
- Postal code: 398 43
- Website: www.obeckrenovice.cz

Křenovice is a municipality and village in Písek District in the South Bohemian Region of the Czech Republic. It has about 200 inhabitants.

Křenovice lies approximately 17 kilometres (11 mi) north-east of Písek, 45 km (28 mi) north of České Budějovice, and 81 km (50 mi) south of Prague.

== Demographics ==
Historical population
Year	Pop.	±%
1869	562	—
1880	543	−3.4%
1890	503	−7.4%
1900	509	+1.2%
1910	443	−13.0%
1921	423	−4.5%
1930	382	−9.7%
1950	292	−23.6%
1961	303	+3.8%
1970	223	−26.4%
1980	176	−21.1%
1991	144	−18.2%
2001	145	+0.7%
2011	156	+7.6%
2021	169	+8.3%
Source: Censuses
