= Křižanov (Písek District) =

- Municipality
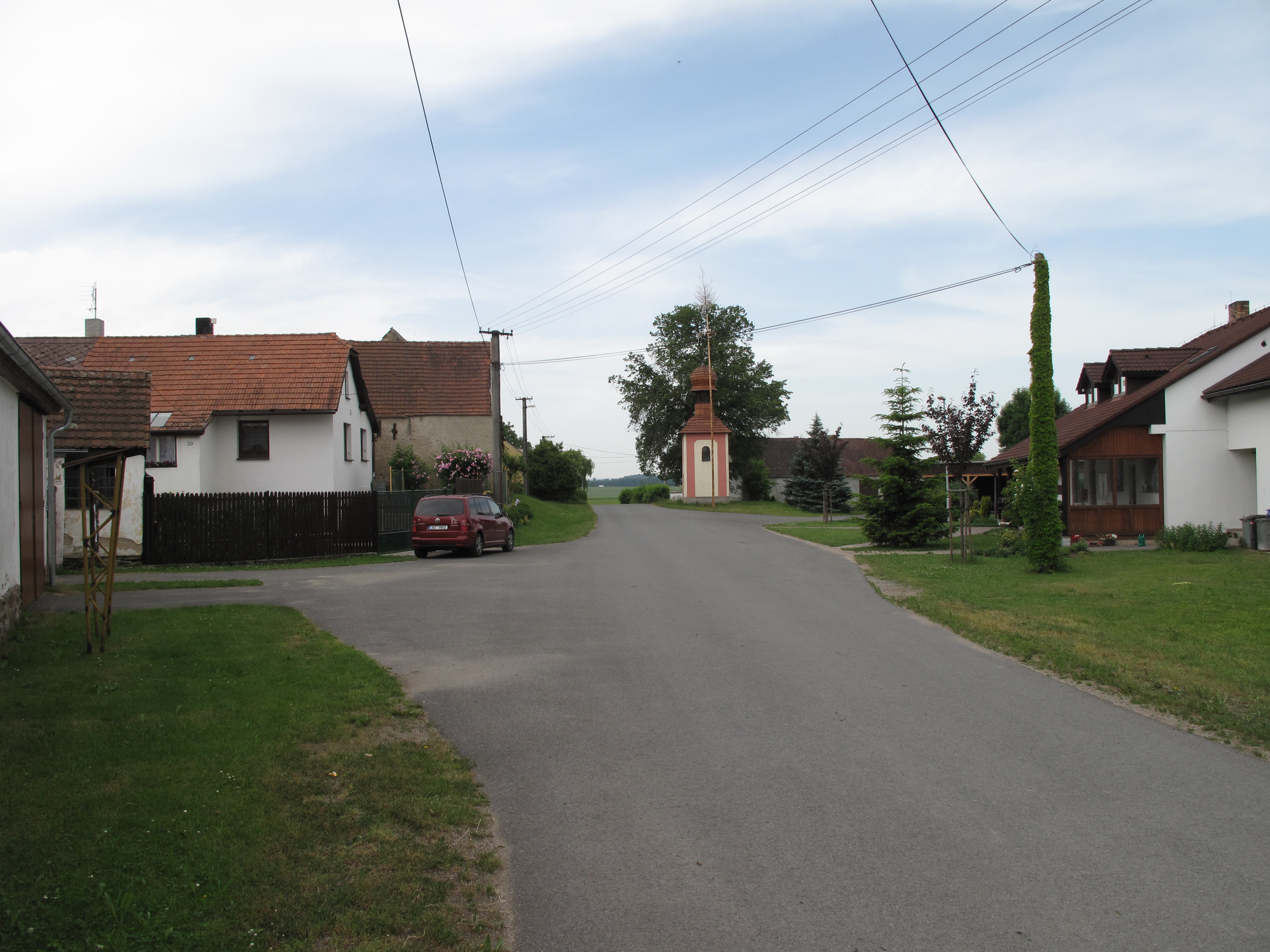
- Centre of Křižanov

- Location in the Czech Republic
- Coordinates: 49°23′56″N 14°22′41″E
- Country: Czech Republic
- Region: South Bohemian
- District: Písek
- First mentioned: 1431

Area
  - Total: 3.35 km^{2} (1.29 sq mi)
- Elevation: 482 m (1,581 ft)

Population (2026-01-01)
  - Total: 94
  - Density: 28/km^{2} (73/sq mi)
- Time zone: UTC+1 (CET)
  - Summer (DST): UTC+2 (CEST)
- Postal code: 398 43
- Website: www.obeckrizanov.eud.cz

Křižanov is a municipality and village in Písek District in the South Bohemian Region of the Czech Republic. It has about 90 inhabitants.

Křižanov lies approximately 21 kilometres (13 mi) north-east of Písek, 48 km (30 mi) north of České Budějovice, and 77 km (48 mi) south of Prague.

== Demographics ==
Historical population
Year	Pop.	±%
1869	249	—
1880	250	+0.4%
1890	242	−3.2%
1900	234	−3.3%
1910	263	+12.4%
1921	254	−3.4%
1930	246	−3.1%
1950	161	−34.6%
1961	151	−6.2%
1970	133	−11.9%
1980	117	−12.0%
1991	106	−9.4%
2001	87	−17.9%
2011	101	+16.1%
2021	95	−5.9%
Source: Censuses
