= Písek District =

Písek District Okres Písek
- District
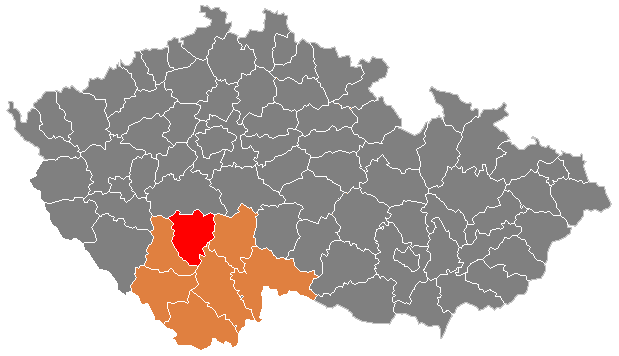
- Location in the South Bohemian Region within the Czech Republic
- Coordinates: 49°23′N 14°12′E
- Country: Czech Republic
- Region: South Bohemian
- Capital: Písek

Area
  - Total: 1,126.86 km^{2} (435.08 sq mi)

Population (2026)
  - Total: 72,765
  - Density: 64.573/km^{2} (167.24/sq mi)
- Time zone: UTC+1 (CET)
  - Summer (DST): UTC+2 (CEST)
- Municipalities: 75
- * Towns: 5
- * Market towns: 2

Písek District (Czech: okres Písek) is a district in the South Bohemian Region of the Czech Republic. Its capital is the town of Písek.

== Administrative division ==
Písek District is divided into two administrative districts of municipalities with extended competence: Písek and Milevsko.

=== List of municipalities ===
Towns are marked in bold and market towns in italics:

Albrechtice nad Vltavou – Bernartice – Borovany – Boudy – Božetice – Branice – Cerhonice – Chyšky – Čimelice – Čížová – Dobev – Dolní Novosedly – Dražíč – Drhovle – Heřmaň – Horosedly – Hrazany – Hrejkovice – Jetětice – Jickovice – Kestřany – Kluky – Kostelec nad Vltavou – Kovářov – Kožlí – Králova Lhota – Křenovice – Křižanov – Kučeř – Květov – Lety – Milevsko – Minice – Mirotice – Mirovice – Mišovice – Myslín – Nerestce – Nevězice – Okrouhlá – Olešná – Orlík nad Vltavou – Osek – Oslov – Ostrovec – Paseky – Písek – Podolí I – Přeborov – Předotice – Přeštěnice – Probulov – Protivín – Putim – Rakovice – Ražice – Sepekov – Skály – Slabčice – Smetanova Lhota – Stehlovice – Tálín – Temešvár – Varvažov – Veselíčko – Vlastec – Vlksice – Vojníkov – Vráž – Vrcovice – Záhoří – Zbelítov – Zběšičky – Žďár – Zhoř – Zvíkovské Podhradí

== Geography ==
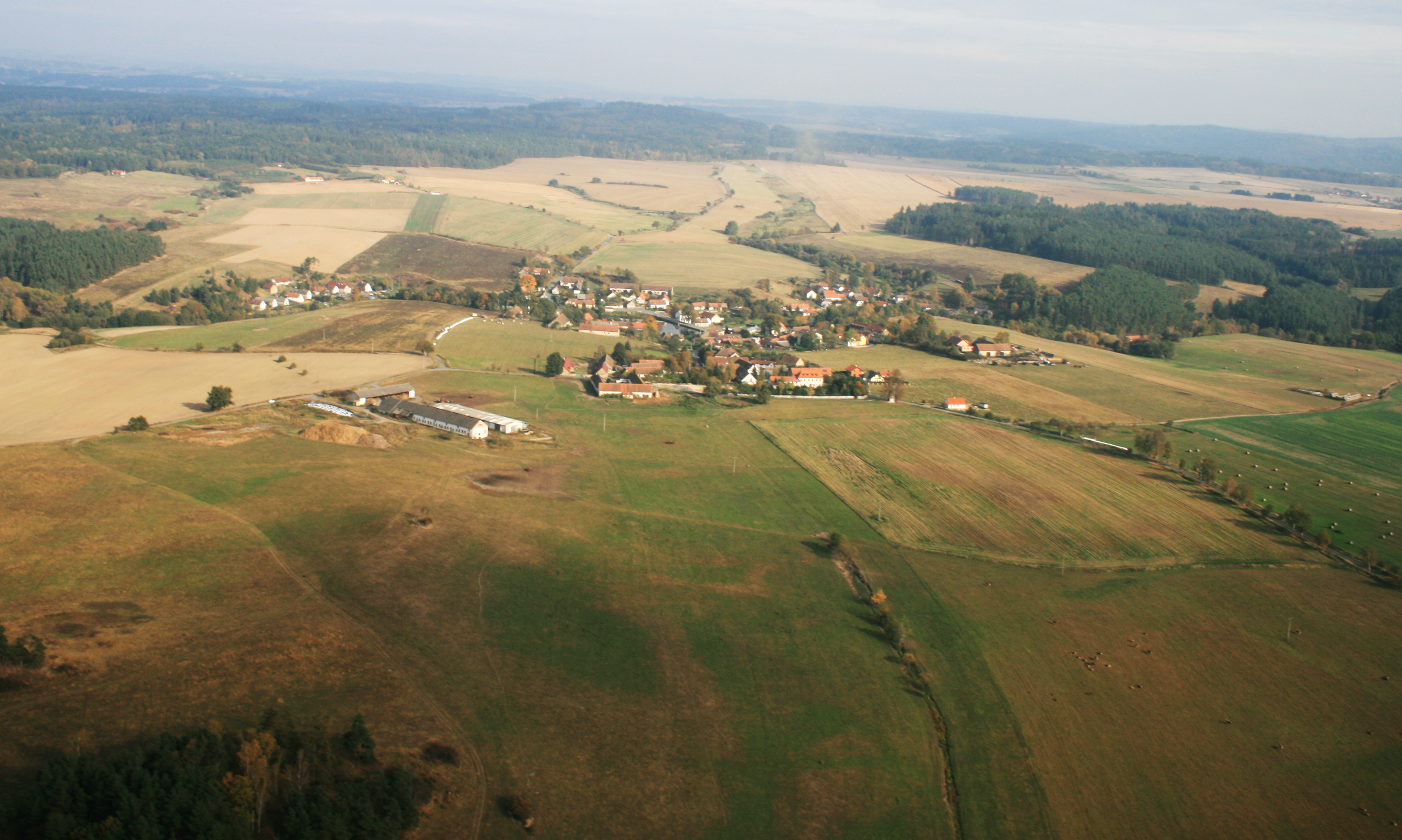
Jickovice and surrounding landscape

Most of the territory is characterised by an undulating landscape with many low hills. The territory extends into four geomorphological mesoregions: Tábor Uplands (most of the territory), Vlašim Uplands (northeast), Benešov Uplands (northwest) and České Budějovice Basin (south). The highest point of the district is the hill Kozlov in Chyšky with an elevation of 709 m (2,326 ft) and the lowest point is the Orlík Reservoir in Kožlí at 348 m (1,142 ft).

From the total district area of 1,126.9 km^{2} (435.1 sq mi), agricultural land occupies 621.3 km^{2} (239.9 sq mi), forests occupy 373.8 km^{2} (144.3 sq mi), and water area occupies 46.7 km^{2} (18.0 sq mi). Forests cover 33.2% of the district's area.

The territory is rich in watercourses and fishponds. The most important river is the Vltava, which flows across the territory from southeast to north, and, together with its tributaries, drains the whole district. The most significant tributary is the Otava, which connects with the Vltava in the centre of the territory. Other notable rivers are the Blanice, Lomnice and Skalice. The Orlík Reservoir, built on the Vltava, is the second largest reservoir in the country. There are many fishponds, especially in the České Budějovice Basin area.

There are no protected landscape areas in the district.

== Demographics ==
Historical population

Year	Pop.	±%
1869	83,683	—
1880	85,837	+2.6%
1890	83,286	−3.0%
1900	84,640	+1.6%
1910	85,425	+0.9%

Year	Pop.	±%
1921	85,308	−0.1%
1930	81,189	−4.8%
1950	70,090	−13.7%
1961	72,023	+2.8%
1970	71,345	−0.9%

Year	Pop.	±%
1980	73,812	+3.5%
1991	71,747	−2.8%
2001	70,300	−2.0%
2011	69,843	−0.7%
2021	69,986	+0.2%

Source: Censuses

=== Most populous municipalities ===
Name	Population	Area (km^{2})
Písek	31,002	63
Milevsko	7,956	42
Protivín	4,706	61
Mirovice	1,627	22
Kovářov	1,480	50
Bernartice	1,402	36
Čížová	1,388	36
Sepekov	1,344	29
Mirotice	1,207	26
Dobev	1,178	21

== Economy ==
The largest employers with headquarters in Písek District and at least 500 employees are:

Economic entity	Location	Number of employees	Main activity
s.n.o.p. cz	Písek	1,000–1,499	Pressing and welding of metal
Písek Hospital	Písek	1,000–1,499	Health care
Aisin Europe Manufacturing Czech	Písek	500–999	Automotive industry
Faurecia Components Písek	Písek	500–999	Automotive industry

== Transport ==
The D4 motorway from Prague to Písek leads into the district. It further continues as the I/20 road, which is part of the European route E49.

== Sights ==
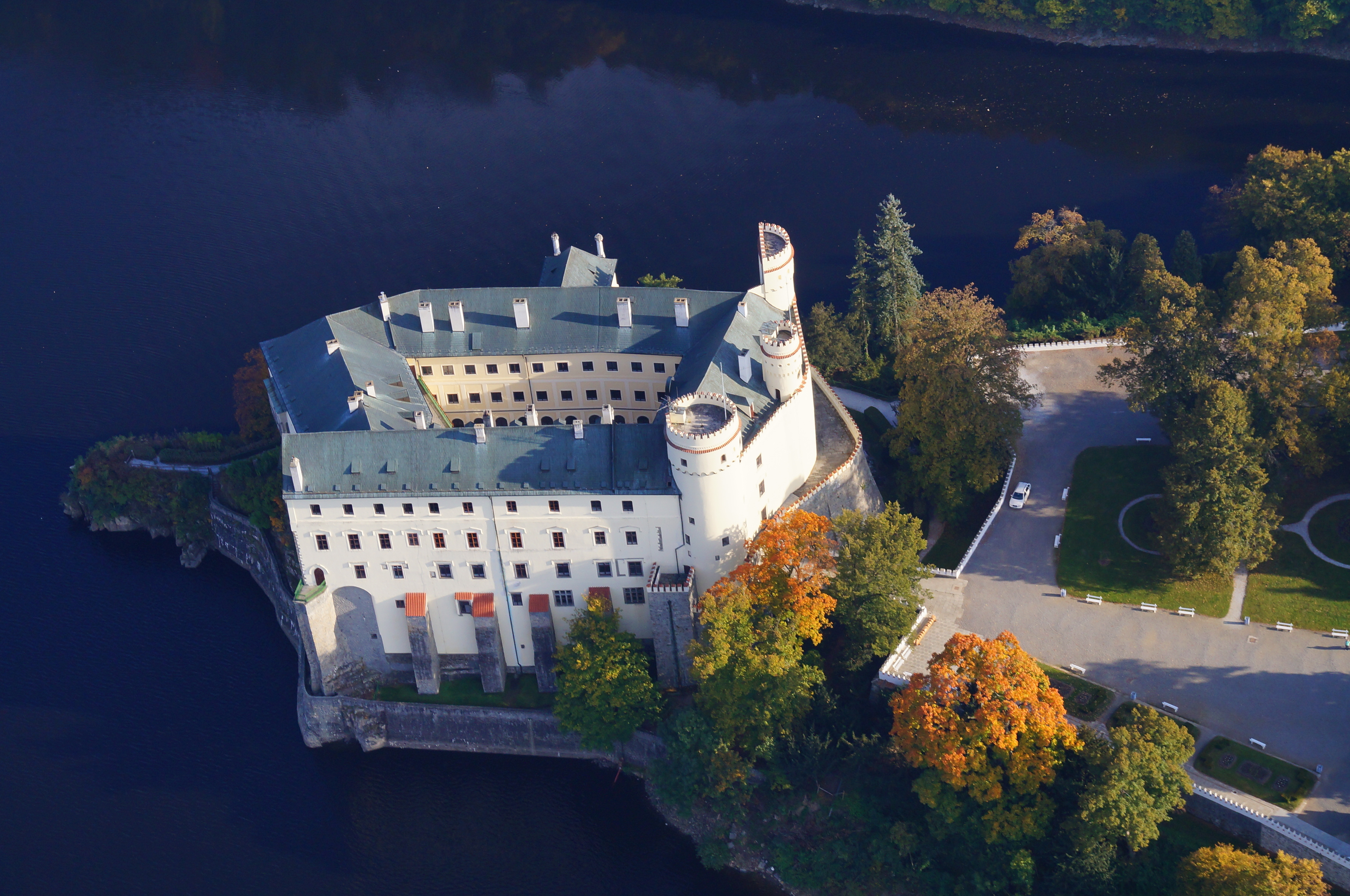
Orlík Castle

The most important monuments in the district, protected as national cultural monuments, are:

- Zvíkov Castle
- Písek Stone Bridge
- Orlík Castle
- Milevsko Monastery
- Písek National Stud Farm

The best-preserved settlements and landscapes, protected as monument zones, are:

- Písek
- Mirovice
- Budičovice
- Krašovice
- Květov
- Putim
- Smrkovice
- Tukleky
- Varvažov
- Zahrádka
- Žebrákov
- Čimelicko-Rakovicko landscape
- Orlicko landscape

The most visited tourist destination is the Zvíkov Castle.
