= Josef Richard Vilímek =

Josef Richard Vilímek is name of two Czech publishers:

- Josef Richard Vilímek (1835–1911), father
- Josef Richard Vilímek (1860–1938), son
