= Stehlovice =

- Municipality
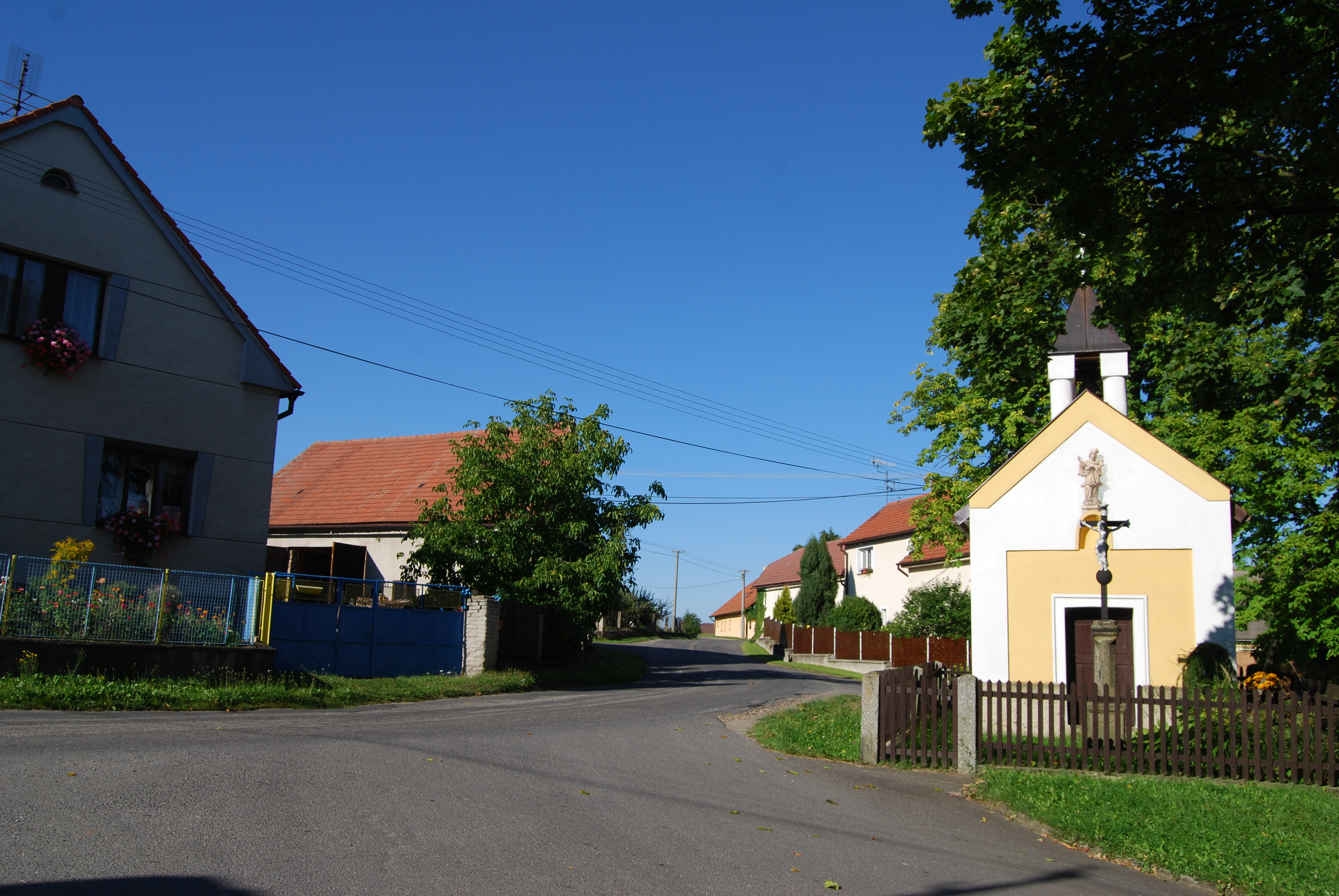
- Centre of Stehlovice

- Location in the Czech Republic
- Coordinates: 49°23′37″N 14°19′22″E
- Country: Czech Republic
- Region: South Bohemian
- District: Písek
- First mentioned: 1306

Area
  - Total: 4.49 km^{2} (1.73 sq mi)
- Elevation: 491 m (1,611 ft)

Population (2026-01-01)
  - Total: 81
  - Density: 18/km^{2} (47/sq mi)
- Time zone: UTC+1 (CET)
  - Summer (DST): UTC+2 (CEST)
- Postal code: 398 43
- Website: www.stehlovice.cz

Stehlovice is a municipality and village in Písek District in the South Bohemian Region of the Czech Republic. It has about 80 inhabitants.

== Etymology ==
The name is derived from the personal name Stehle, meaning "the village of Stehle's people".

== Geography ==
Stehlovice is located about 15 kilometres (9 mi) northeast of Písek and 46 km (29 mi) north of České Budějovice. It lies in the Tábor Uplands. The highest point is the hill Mladšiny at 535 metres (1,755 ft) above sea level.

== History ==
The first written mention of Stehlovice is from 1306, when the village was owned by the monastery in Milevsko. From 1431, it was a property of the Rosenberg family. In 1575, when it was owned by the royal chamber, Emperor Maximilian II sold the Milevsko estate with Stehlovice to Kryštof of Švamberk. He annexed Stehlovice to the Orlík estate and the village remained part of it until the establishment of an independent municipality in 1848.

== Demographics ==
Historical population

Year	Pop.	±%
1869	256	—
1880	250	−2.3%
1890	239	−4.4%
1900	222	−7.1%
1910	216	−2.7%

Year	Pop.	±%
1921	233	+7.9%
1930	209	−10.3%
1950	155	−25.8%
1961	162	+4.5%
1970	161	−0.6%

Year	Pop.	±%
1980	129	−19.9%
1991	104	−19.4%
2001	94	−9.6%
2011	100	+6.4%
2021	84	−16.0%

Source: Censuses

== Transport ==
Stehlovice is located on the railway line Písek–Tábor.

== Sights ==
The main landmark of Stehlovice is the Chapel of Saint John of Nepomuk. It was built at the beginning of the 19th century and is decorated with folk Baroque elements. In front of the chapel is a cast iron cross from 1865.
