= Vilimek =

Vilimek or Vilímek is a surname. Notable people with the surname include:

- Jan Vilímek (1860–1938), Czech illustrator and painter
- Josef Richard Vilímek (1835 – 1911), Czech publisher
- Josef Richard Vilímek (1860 – 1938), Czech publisher
- Mike Vilimek (born 1979), Canadian football player
