= Sepekov =

- Market town
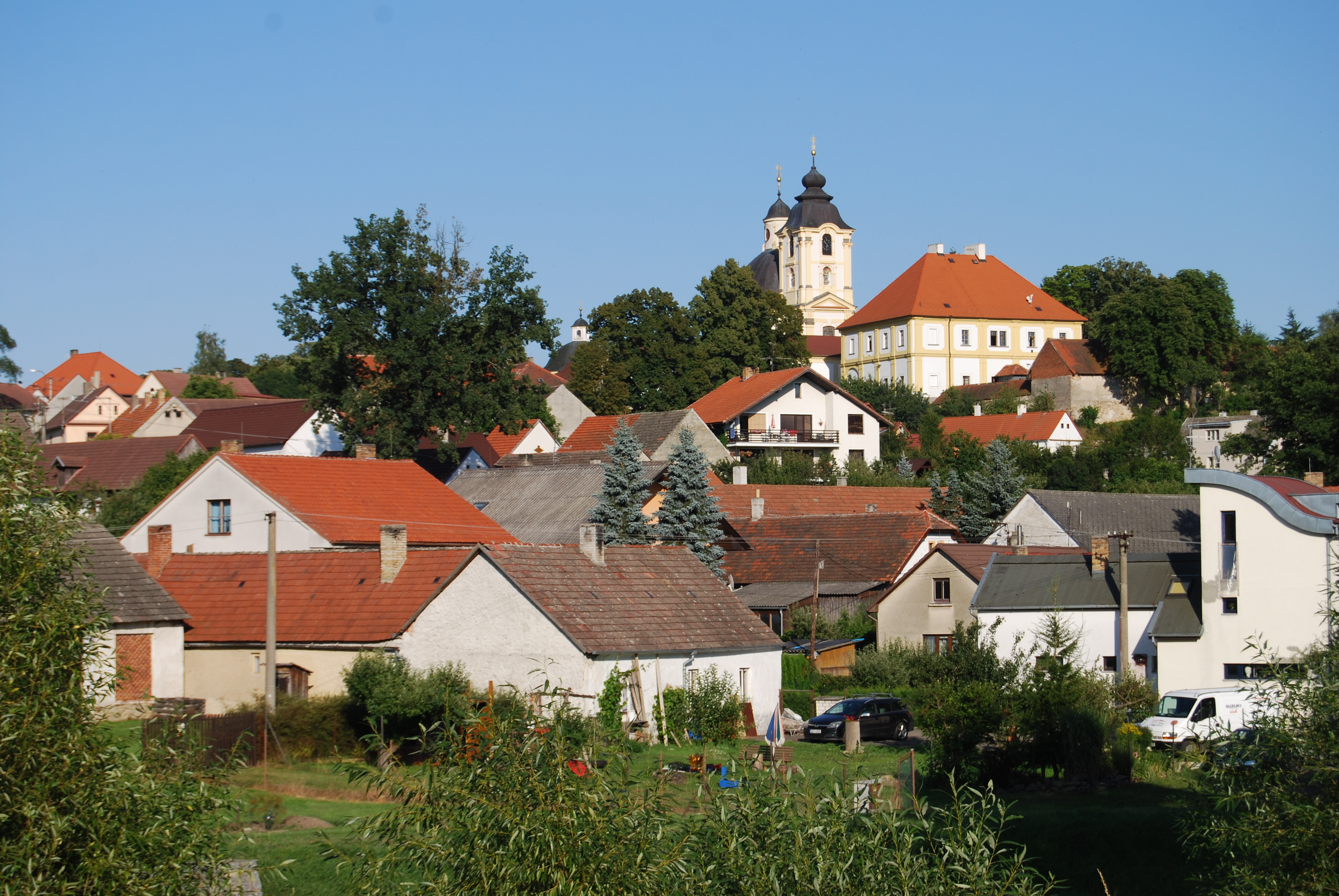
- General view of Sepekov

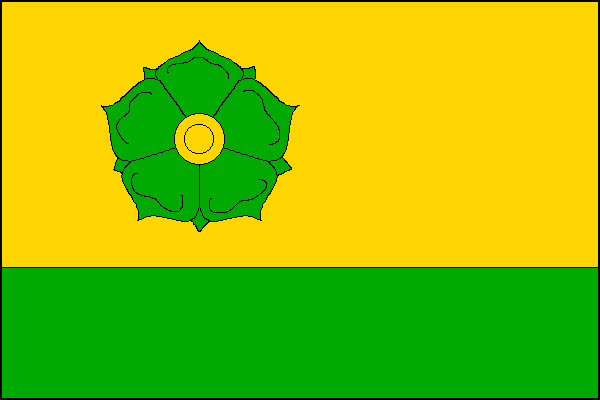
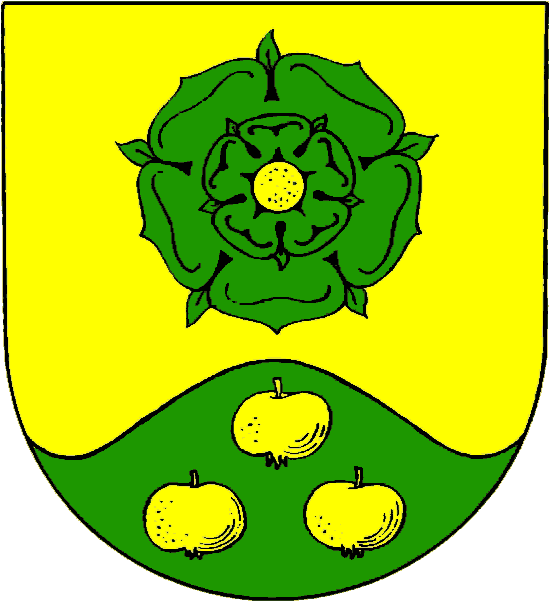
- Flag Coat of arms

- Location in the Czech Republic
- Coordinates: 49°25′43″N 14°25′5″E
- Country: Czech Republic
- Region: South Bohemian
- District: Písek
- First mentioned: 1243

Area
  - Total: 28.53 km^{2} (11.02 sq mi)
- Elevation: 450 m (1,480 ft)

Population (2026-01-01)
  - Total: 1,344
  - Density: 47.11/km^{2} (122.0/sq mi)
- Time zone: UTC+1 (CET)
  - Summer (DST): UTC+2 (CEST)
- Postal code: 398 51
- Website: www.sepekov.eu

Sepekov (Czech pronunciation: [ˈsɛpɛkof]) is a market town in Písek District in the South Bohemian Region of the Czech Republic. It has about 1,300 inhabitants.

== Administrative division ==
Sepekov consists of three municipal parts (in brackets population according to the 2021 census):

- Sepekov (1,129)
- Líšnice (175)
- Zálší (14)

== Etymology ==
The name Sepekov was derived from the Old Czech verb péci sě ('to care'), meaning "the settlement of people who care too much".

== Geography ==
Sepekov is located about 23 kilometres (14 mi) northeast of Písek and 64 km (40 mi) south of Prague. It lies in the Tábor Uplands. The highest point is the hill Chlum at 540 m (1,772 ft) above sea level. The Smutná River and several streams flow through the municipal territory. There are several fishponds in the territory.

== History ==
The first written mention of Sepekov is from 1243. The village was owned by the Rosenberg family until 1484, when they sold it to Zdeslav of Sternberg. In the 16th century, it was acquired by the Schwamberg family and joined to the Bechyně estate. When Peter Vok of Rosenberg bought this estate in 1569, it excluded Sepekov, which was joined to the Milevsko estate. Milevsko was bought by the Hodějovský of Hodějov family, but their properties were confiscated after the Battle of White Mountain in 1620. In 1623, Sepekov was donated to the Strahov Monastery.

In 1869, Sepekov was promoted to a market town.

== Demographics ==
Historical population

Year	Pop.	±%
1869	1,700	—
1880	1,675	−1.5%
1890	1,681	+0.4%
1900	1,630	−3.0%
1910	1,621	−0.6%

Year	Pop.	±%
1921	1,707	+5.3%
1930	1,604	−6.0%
1950	1,356	−15.5%
1961	1,491	+10.0%
1970	1,454	−2.5%

Year	Pop.	±%
1980	1,422	−2.2%
1991	1,341	−5.7%
2001	1,363	+1.6%
2011	1,321	−3.1%
2021	1,318	−0.2%

Source: Censuses

== Transport ==
The I/19 road (the section from Plzeň to Tábor) runs through the northern part of the market town.

Sepekov is located on the railway line Tábor–Písek.

== Sights ==
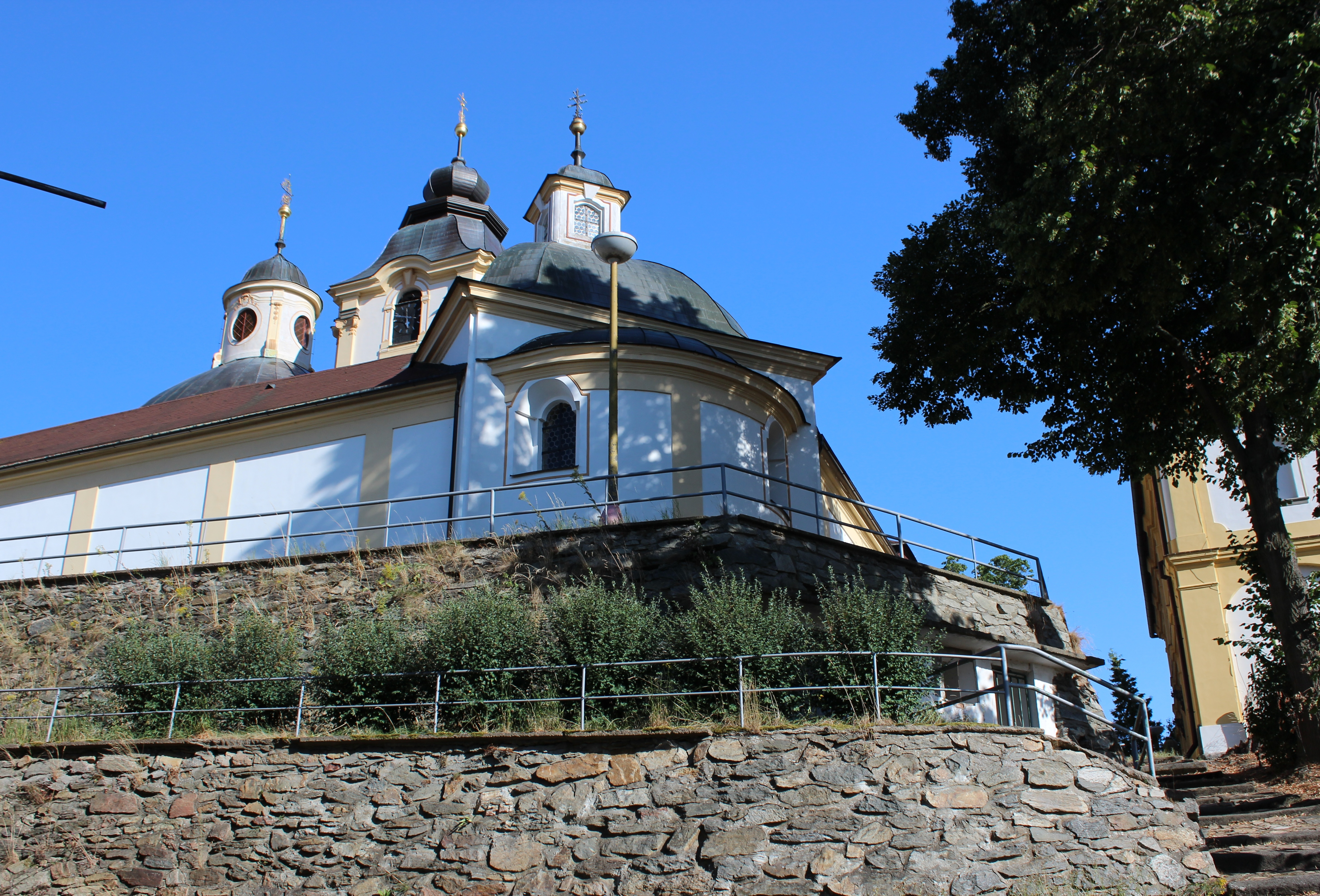
Church of the Name of the Virgin Mary

The main landmark of Sepekov is the Church of the Name of the Virgin Mary. It was built in the Baroque style in 1730–1733. Other monuments are vaulted corridors around the church built in 1760–1767, and the rectory from 1736.

== Notable people ==
- Břetislav Benda (1897–1983), sculptor
- Miloslav Vlk (1932–2017), archbishop and cardinal
