= Smutná =

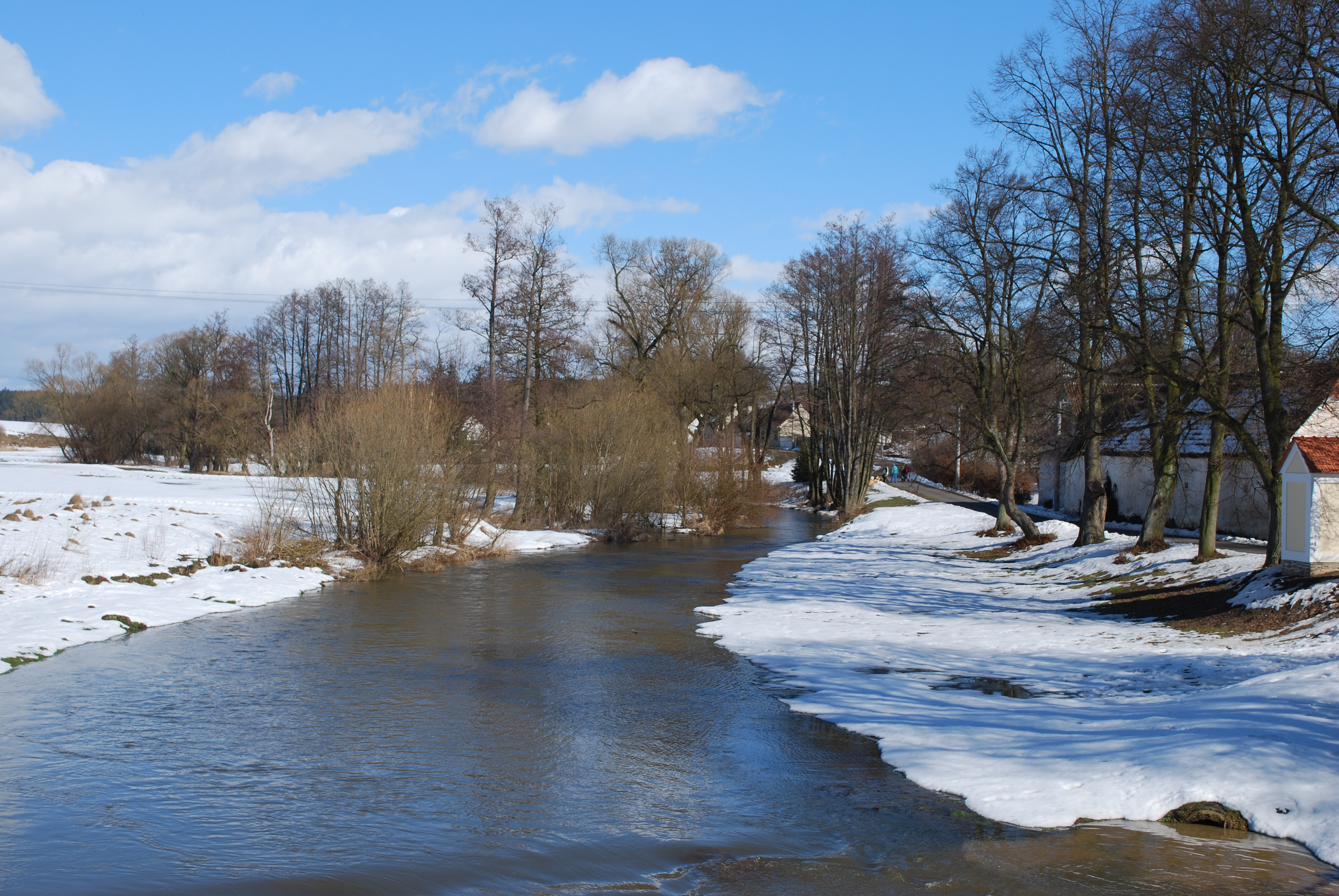
- The Smutná in Rataje

Location
- Country: Czech Republic
- Region: South Bohemian

Physical characteristics
- Source
  - location: Jistebnice, Vlašim Uplands
  - coordinates: 49°31′9″N 14°32′52″E
  - elevation: 620 m (2,030 ft)
- Mouth
  - location: Lužnice
  - coordinates: 49°17′22″N 14°28′8″E
  - elevation: 356 m (1,168 ft)
- Length: 47.8 km (29.7 mi)
- Basin size: 247.0 km^{2} (95.4 sq mi)
- Discharge
  - average: 1.2 m^{3}/s (42 cu ft/s) near estuary

Basin features
- Progression: Lužnice→ Vltava→ Elbe→ North Sea

The Smutná is a river in the Czech Republic, a right tributary of the Lužnice River. It flows through the South Bohemian Region. It is 47.8 km (29.7 mi) long.

== Etymology ==
The name Smutná (literally 'sad' in Czech) refers to the calm character of the river flow.

== Characteristic ==
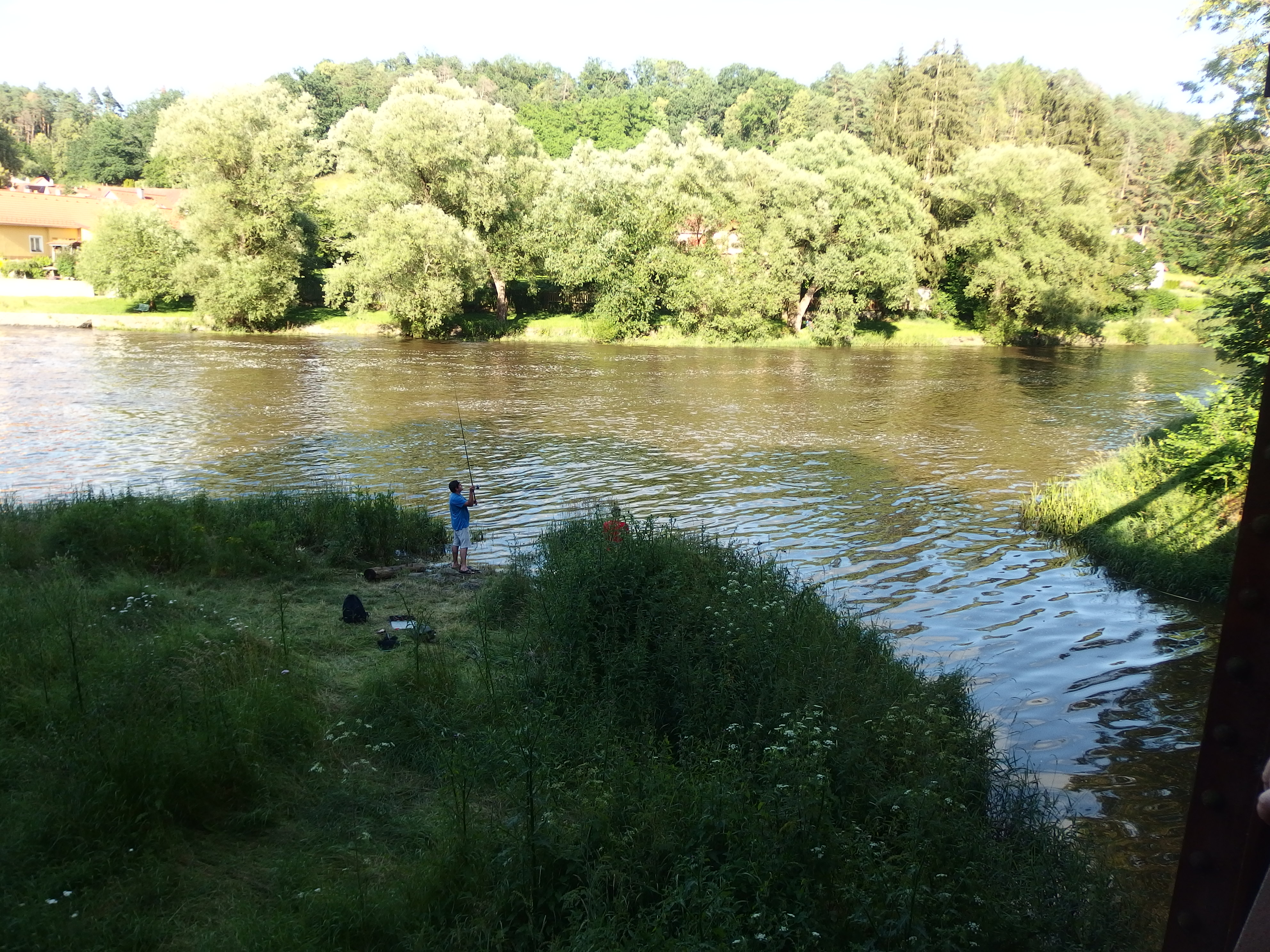
Confluence of the Smutná (right) and Lužnice

The Smutná originates in the territory of Jistebnice in the Vlašim Uplands at an elevation of 620 m (2,030 ft) and flows to Bechyně, where it enters the Lužnice River at an elevation of 356 m (1,168 ft). It is 47.8 km (29.7 mi) long. Its drainage basin has an area of 247.0 km^{2} (95.4 sq mi).

The longest tributaries of the Smutná are:

Tributary	Length (km)	Side
Milevský potok	20.6	right
Nadějkovský potok	8.6	right
Dobřemilický potok	6.7	right

== Course ==
The river flows through the municipal territories of Jistebnice, Nadějkov, Vlksice, Božetice, Sepekov, Opařany, Zběšičky, Bernartice, Stádlec, Rataje, Haškovcova Lhota, Radětice and Bechyně.

== Bodies of water ==
There are 507 bodies of water in the basin area. A system of fishponds in built on the upper course of the river. The largest of them and the largest body of water in the entire basin area is Velká Kaplice with an area of 22.9 ha (57 acres). The fishpond Chobot with an area of 19.2 ha (47 acres) is built on the middle course of the river.

== Tourism ==
The Smutná is suitable for river tourism. About 24 km (15 mi) of the river is navigable. The river is navigable mostly in spring or after rains, but thanks to the system of fishponds, the water level in it drops only slowly after the rains.

== See also ==
- List of rivers of the Czech Republic
