= Bernartice (Písek District) =

- Market town
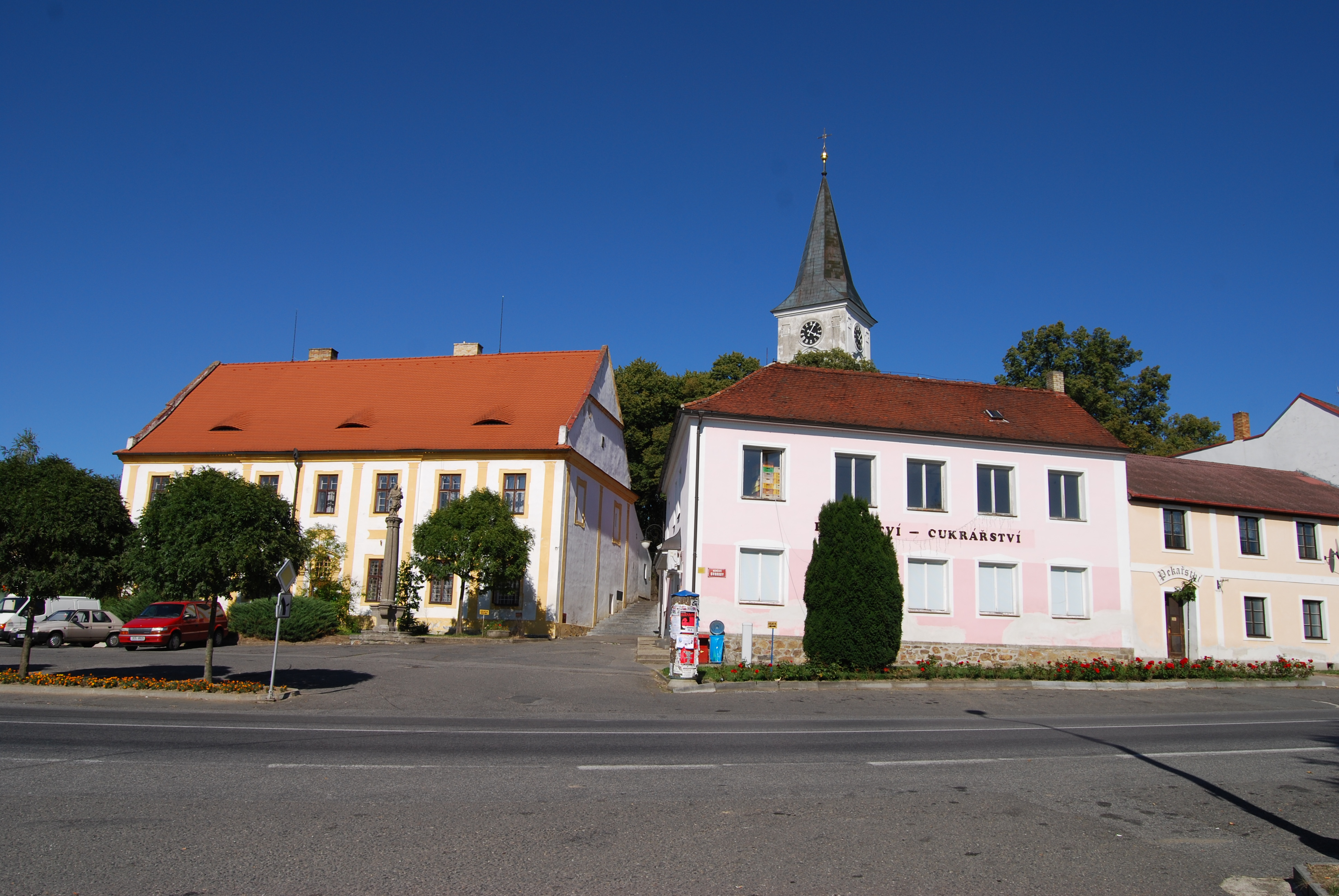
- Centre of Bernartice

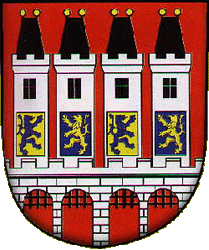
- Coat of arms

- Location in the Czech Republic
- Coordinates: 49°22′8″N 14°22′52″E
- Country: Czech Republic
- Region: South Bohemian
- District: Písek
- First mentioned: 1251

Area
  - Total: 36.43 km^{2} (14.07 sq mi)
- Elevation: 450 m (1,480 ft)

Population (2026-01-01)
  - Total: 1,402
  - Density: 38.48/km^{2} (99.68/sq mi)
- Time zone: UTC+1 (CET)
  - Summer (DST): UTC+2 (CEST)
- Postal code: 398 43
- Website: www.bernartice.cz

Bernartice (Czech pronunciation: [ˈbɛrnarcɪtsɛ]) is a market town in Písek District in the South Bohemian Region of the Czech Republic. It has about 1,400 inhabitants.

== Administrative division ==
Bernartice consists of 11 municipal parts (in brackets population according to the 2021 census):

- Bernartice (844)
- Bilinka (36)
- Bojenice (73)
- Dvůr Leveč (6)
- Jestřebice (85)
- Kolišov (20)
- Ráb (3)
- Rakov (27)
- Srlín (107)
- Svatkovice (88)
- Zběšice (43)

== Etymology ==
The name Bernartice is derived from the personal name Bernart (a variant of Bernard), meaning "the village of Bernart's people".

== Geography ==
Bernartice is located about 18 kilometres (11 mi) northeast of Písek and 43 km (27 mi) north of České Budějovice. It lies in the Tábor Uplands. The highest point is a nameless hill at 531 m (1,742 ft) above sea level. The Smutná River flows along the eastern municipal border. There are several fishponds in the municipal territory.

== History ==
The first written mention of Bernartice is from 1251. In the 1430s, when Mikuláš Krchlebec acquired Bernartice, it was already a market town. Among the most notable owners of the market town were the Prague Jesuits (in the years 1606–1773) and the Paar family (in the 19th century).

During World War II, Bernartice was threatened by the arrival of the Nazis which would have given the village a similar fate as the nearby village of Lidice, which was burned down. With the help of locals, 23 people were killed and five were sent to concentration camps.

== Demographics ==
Historical population

Year	Pop.	±%
1869	3,001	—
1880	2,931	−2.3%
1890	2,813	−4.0%
1900	2,749	−2.3%
1910	2,891	+5.2%

Year	Pop.	±%
1921	2,946	+1.9%
1930	2,633	−10.6%
1950	2,025	−23.1%
1961	1,994	−1.5%
1970	1,737	−12.9%

Year	Pop.	±%
1980	1,416	−18.5%
1991	1,239	−12.5%
2001	1,222	−1.4%
2011	1,267	+3.7%
2021	1,332	+5.1%

Source: Censuses

== Transport ==
The I/29 road from Písek to Tábor District runs through the market town.

== Sights ==
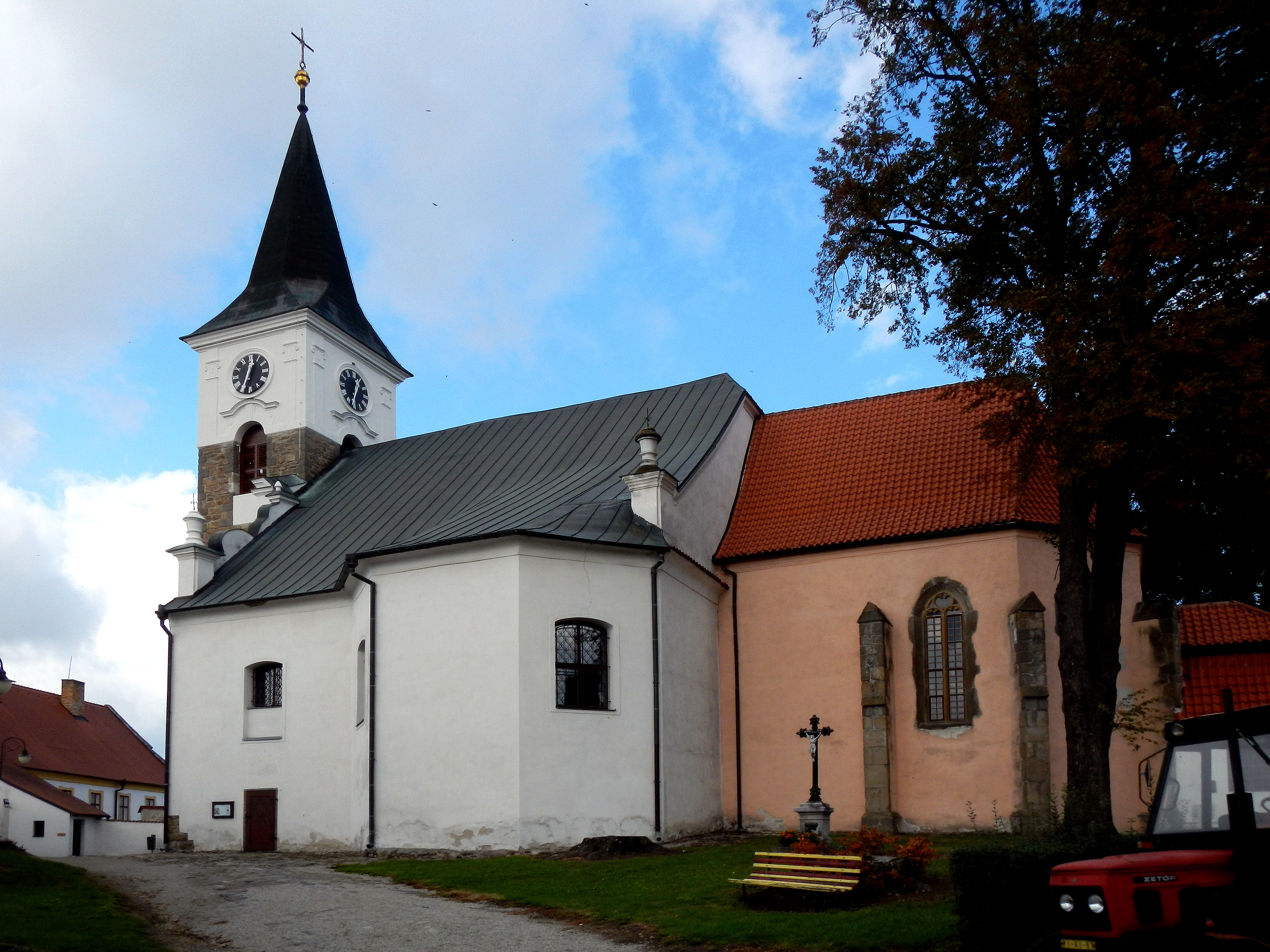
Church of St. Martin

The main landmark of Bernartice is the Church of Saint Martin. It was built in the Romanesque style in the 12th century and part of the Romanesque tower is preserved to this day. In the second half of the 14th century, it was rebuilt in the Gothic style. In 1717, the nave was rebuilt in the Baroque style. Next to the church is a Baroque rectory from the early 18th century.
