= Jan Vítězslav Dušek =

Czech sculptor

- Born: 8 June 1891; Makov, Bohemia, Austria-Hungary
- Died: 2 March 1966 (aged 74); Tábor, Czechoslovakia
- Occupation: Sculptor

Jan Vítězslav Dušek (also known under the pseudonym Jean Dušek; 8 June 1891 – 2 March 1966) was a Czech sculptor.

== Life and education ==
Jan Vítězslav Dušek was born on 8 June 1891 in Makov, Bohemia, Austria-Hungary (today part of Jistebnice in the Czech Republic). In 1905–1909, he studied sculpture in Hořice. Before World War I, he tried an independent career in Prague and then worked in various studios in Vienna. During World War I, he was with a regiment in Galicia and Debrecen. In 1920, he settled in Tábor, near his birthplace. In 1921–1922, he attended the Académie de la Grande Chaumière in Paris, France, studying with the professor Antoine Bourdelle. In the following years, he went on several shorter study trips to France. After 1931, he regularly went on study tours to other countries.

== Career ==
His work was part of the art competitions at the 1924 Summer Olympics and the 1936 Summer Olympics.
