= Břetislav Benda =

Czech sculptor

Břetislav Benda (28 March 1897 – 19 August 1983) was a Czech sculptor, student of Josef Václav Myslbek and member of Mánes Union of Fine Arts from 1923. He was born in Sepekov.

Benda's bronzes often focused on the female body, being one of the few sculptors to focus on this almost exclusively. His architectural sculpture includes interior work at the St. Vitus Cathedral in Prague, the Komerční banka in Náchod (with the architect Pavel Janák) and a relief for a 1935 savings bank in České Budějovice. In 1968, the Council of Czech Jewish Religious Communities commissioned Benda to create a memorial sculpture at the former trade fair building in Prague where most of the Jews of Prague were rounded up by the Nazis and deported to Terezín, onward to Theresienstadt and other concentration camps. The three-part sculpture included an inscription describing the function of the building during the Nazi regime, but the sculpture was never unveiled at the site due to government opposition. It was eventually placed in the town of Terezín itself, on the wall of the Theresienstadt fortifications adjacent to the road that leads to the crematorium and Jewish victims' cemetery.

He died in Prague, where he is buried at the Vyšehrad Cemetery.
