= Matěj Kopecký =

Czech puppeteer

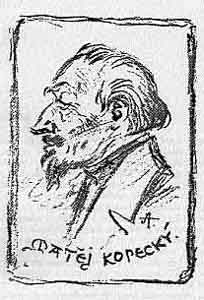
Matěj Kopecký

Matěj Kopecký (24 February 1775, probably in Libčany – 3 July 1847 in Koloděje nad Lužnicí) was a Czech puppeteer. For six generations his descendants followed the art of puppeteering.

Kopecký's father was a poor travelling puppeteer (histrio vagus). Matěj Kopecký married in 1795 and moved into the town of Mirotice. Since 1789 to 1808 or 1809 he was forced to serve in the army, within the infantry regiment from Písek. Later, he worked as watchmaker, travelling salesman or road worker. In 1818 he obtained licence for a puppet theatre and reached certain success in this activity. The parish record about his death, though, labels him as "a histrion from Mirotice, widower and beggar". Kopecký had at least fifteen children of which six had survived into adulthood. Most of them worked as puppeteers and the tradition was kept for six generations.

At his time the puppet theatre was, for many in the Czech lands, the only contact with theatrical culture, with ideas of enlightenment and of the Czech National Revival. While Kopecký was not the only Czech puppeteer, he became the most known one during the second half of the 19th century when his son Václav Kopecký published his plays in print, and due to a fictional picture of Kopecký by Mikoláš Aleš.

In 1905, a small memorial to Kopecký was erected in Týn nad Vltavou and in 1947 another one in the castle park in Koloděje nad Lužnicí. The town museum in Týn nad Vltavou hosts a permanent puppet exposition dedicated to Kopecký.

== Works ==
Kopecký had used marionettes, with height up to 60 cm.

In 1862, a collection of 61 plays was published by Josef Richard Vilímek under the title "Comedies and plays by Matěj Kopecký as collected by his son Václav" (Komedie a hry Matěje Kopeckého dle sepsání syna Václava). Several people, among them Václav Thám, are listed as authors of the plays. Being intended for uneducated public, the plays had been full of emotions and naive humour. For most of the time Kopecký used Czech language, on occasions when had acted for high nobility German language.
