= Jistebnice =

- Town
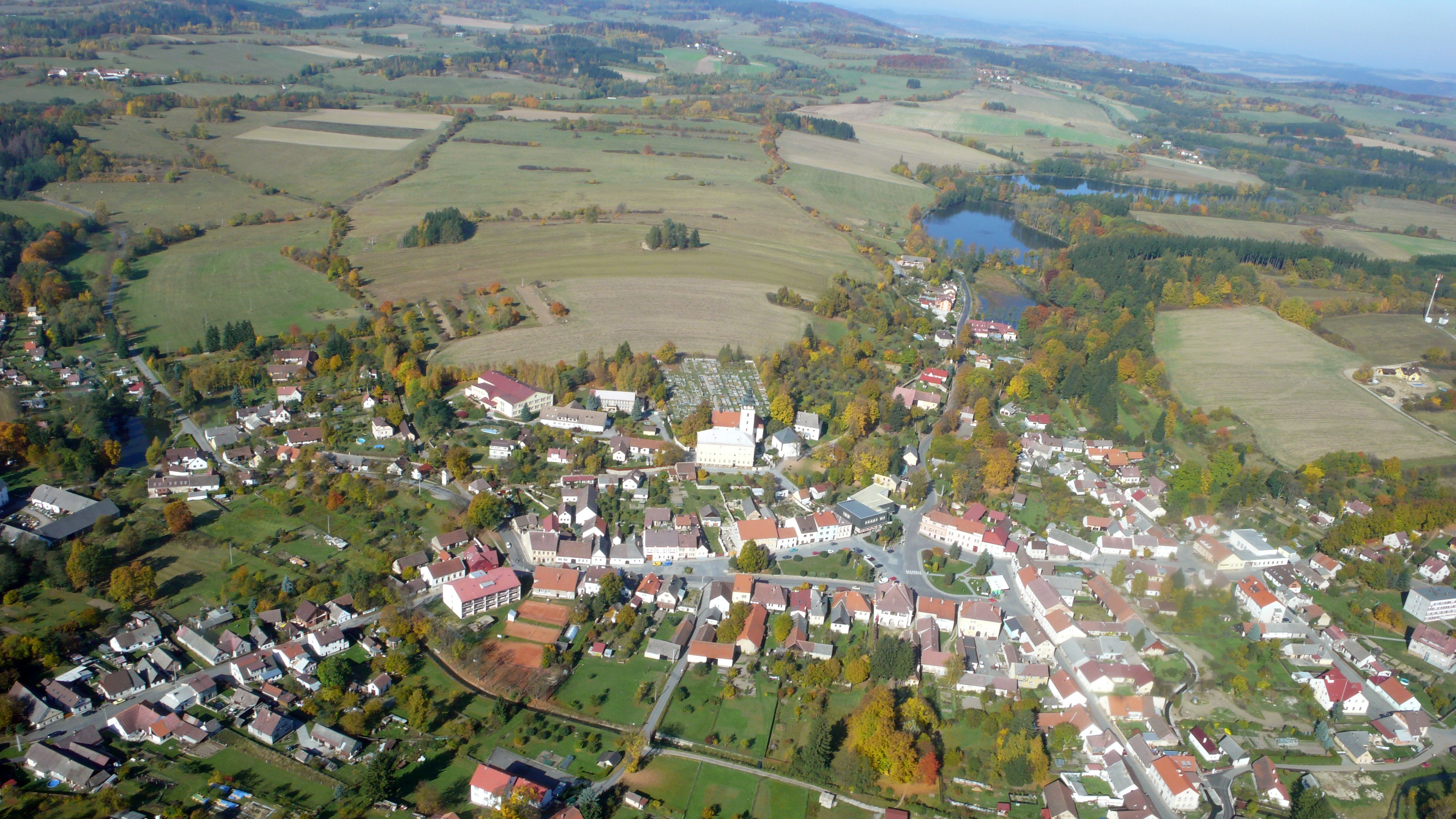
- Aerial view

- Coat of arms

- Location in the Czech Republic
- Coordinates: 49°29′8″N 14°31′39″E
- Country: Czech Republic
- Region: South Bohemian
- District: Tábor
- First mentioned: 1262

Government
  - Mayor: Jiří Popelka

Area
  - Total: 57.99 km^{2} (22.39 sq mi)
- Elevation: 578 m (1,896 ft)

Population (2026-01-01)
  - Total: 2,121
  - Density: 36.58/km^{2} (94.73/sq mi)
- Time zone: UTC+1 (CET)
  - Summer (DST): UTC+2 (CEST)
- Postal codes: 391 31, 391 32, 391 33
- Website: www.jistebnice.cz

Jistebnice (Czech pronunciation: [ˈjɪstɛbɲɪtsɛ]; German: Jistebnitz) is a town in Tábor District in the South Bohemian Region of the Czech Republic. It has about 2,100 inhabitants.

== Administrative division ==
Jistebnice consists of 27 municipal parts (in brackets population according to the 2021 census):

- Jistebnice (952)
- Alenina Lhota (3)
- Božejovice (203)
- Chlum (21)
- Cunkov (8)
- Drahnětice (48)
- Hodkov (18)
- Hůrka (75)
- Javoří (8)
- Jezviny (1)
- Křivošín (35)
- Makov (99)
- Nehonín (9)
- Orlov (30)
- Ostrý (47)
- Ounuz (9)
- Padařov (139)
- Plechov (15)
- Podol (29)
- Pohoří (14)
- Smrkov (42)
- Stružinec (7)
- Svoříž (47)
- Třemešná (22)
- Vlásenice (119)
- Zbelítov (14)
- Zvěstonín (25)

== Etymology ==
Jistebnice was originally the name of the Smutná River, which was transferred to the settlement. The name was derived from the Czech adjective jistebná (from jistba, in this case in Old Czech meaning "house of the fishpond keeper", referring to the fishponds on the river located near today's settlement).

== Geography ==
Jistebnice is located about 13 kilometres (8 mi) northwest of Tábor and 56 km (35 mi) north of České Budějovice. It lies in the Vlašim Uplands. The highest point is the hill Bušová at 669 m (2,195 ft) above sea level. The originates near the Ostrý village and then flows through the market town proper. The municipal territory is rich in fishponds, supplied by the Smutná and several its tributaries.

== History ==
The first written mention of Jistebnice is from 1262, when it was a market village owned by the Rosenberg family. In the 15th century, during the Hussite Wars, many citizens left Jistebnice and went to the newly founded Tábor, which was co-founded by the Hussite governor Petr Hromádka from Jistebnice.

In 1872, the Jistebnice hymn book was founded in Jistebnice.

Jistebnice became a town for the first time before 1654. It lost this status after 1945 and it became a town again on 17 October 2011.

== Demographics ==
Historical population

Year	Pop.	±%
1869	4,961	—
1880	4,996	+0.7%
1890	4,673	−6.5%
1900	4,487	−4.0%
1910	4,235	−5.6%

Year	Pop.	±%
1921	4,105	−3.1%
1930	3,672	−10.5%
1950	2,790	−24.0%
1961	2,850	+2.2%
1970	2,598	−8.8%

Year	Pop.	±%
1980	2,444	−5.9%
1991	2,193	−10.3%
2001	2,046	−6.7%
2011	1,987	−2.9%
2021	2,039	+2.6%

Source: Censuses

== Transport ==
The railway line Tábor–Písek runs along the southern municipal border. There are two train stations: Padařov and Božejovice.

== Sights ==
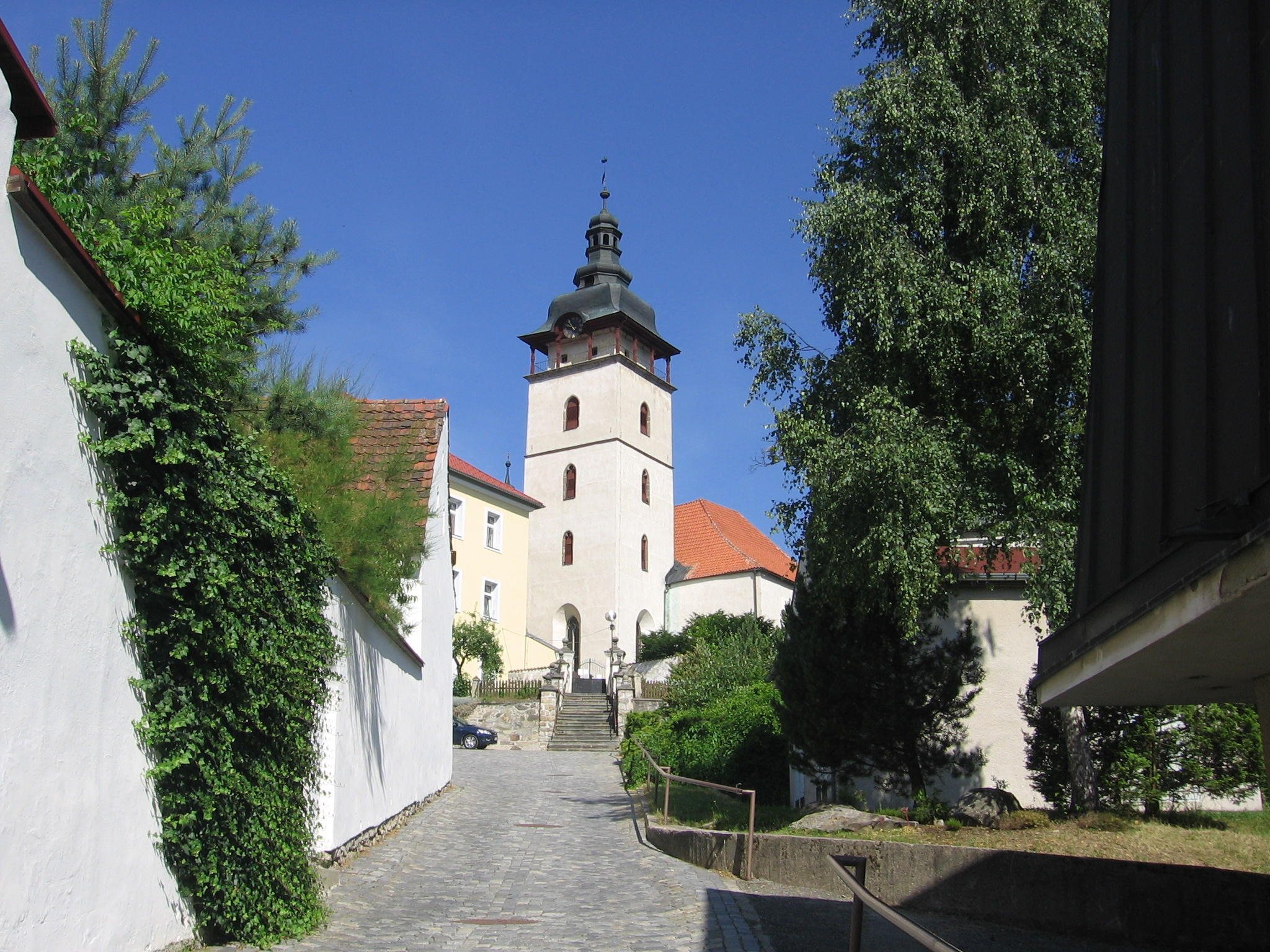
Church of Saint Michael the Archangel

The main landmark of Jistebnice is the Church of Saint Michael the Archangel. It has a Romanesque core from the early 13th century. The church was gothic rebuilt in 1380–1385 and baroque rebuilt in 1718, then Gothic modifications were made in the second half of the 19th century.

A landmark of the town square is Vlašský dům, also called Starý zámek ('old castle'). It is originally a Renaissance castle from the second half of the 16th century. It was rebuilt in the Baroque style in the second half of the 18th century. Today it houses the memorial hall of the painter Richard Lauda, local native.

The Jistebnice Castle is a neo-Gothic castle built in 1878–1882. It is surrounded by an English park, which was designed by the architect František Thomayer. Today the castle is privately owned and inaccessible.

Jistebnice Fortress was built by the Rosenbergs in the 13th century. The remains of the fortress include two semicircular bastions. It is inaccessible and dilapidated.

== Notable people ==
- Jan Vítězslav Dušek (1891–1966), sculptor
- Otto Katz (1895–1952), spy
