= Otto Katz =

Czech publicist (1895–1952)

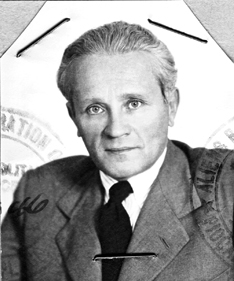

Personal details
- Born: 27 May 1895 Jistebnice, Austria-Hungary
- Died: 3 December 1952 (aged 57) Prague, Czechoslovakia
- Spouse: Ilse Klagemann

Otto Katz (27 May 1895 – 3 December 1952), also known as André Simone amongst other aliases, was a Czech agent. He was one of the most influential agents of the Soviet Union under Stalin in Western intellectual and artistic circles during the 1930s and 1940s. He was hanged after he was convicted in the Slánský trial.

Known for his many pseudonyms, his seductiveness, his cynicism and versatility, from Paris to Hollywood from Mexico City to London, he participated in all the major Comintern disinformation campaigns in the 1930s, under the leadership of Willi Münzenberg who he eventually usurped after spying on him for the NKVD, if the rumours were to be believed.

He became an international spy unconditionally faithful to Stalin, and unlike some of the communist Jewish intellectuals who ran the Comintern at the time, he accepted the German-Soviet Pact and was entrusted with the implementation of secret policies by Stalin's politburo. He was strongly suspected, without conclusive evidence, of involvement as Ramon Mercader's handler in the assassination of Leon Trotsky, and in the supposed murder of Willi Münzenberg who was found hanged in a French forest. Various purges, liquidations and murders required by Stalin during the Spanish Civil War are also attributed to him.

== Early life and studies ==
The German-speaking Jewish family of Edmund Katz, a successful manufacturer, the father of the young Otto, was part of the thriving Jewish community in Jistebnice. Leopold Katz, an uncle of Otto's, was a historian and lawyer famous for having discovered the Jistebnice Hymnal, a collection of Hussite psalms calling for reform. "Leopold became a patron of the Czech Academy of Arts and Sciences and prominent leader of the Czech Jewish movement.". The mother of Otto, Františka Piskerová, died prematurely in 1900 after giving birth to three sons (Leopold, named after his uncle, in 1891, Robert in 1893 and Otto) and their father Edmund subsequently married a German, Otilie Schulhof. The family moved to Prague, where the family business continued to thrive, and then moved to the industrial centre, Plzeň.

After classical studies in Prague, where Otto revealed a gift for languages (he fluently spoke five: German, Czech, English, French and Russian), he joined the prestigious Imperial Export Academy, which prepared young men for top jobs in international trade, in 1913 where he became fascinated with the Redl case. He did not finish his studies and was sent by his father for military training. During World War I, he refused to become an officer because of socialist sympathies developed in Vienna. Mobilized, injured on Christmas night in 1914, he deserted twice and spent several months under fortress-arrest.

Demobilized in January 1919, Otto was employed at Pössneck in Thuringia before joining the "Meva", a metallurgical company in Prague.

== Bohemian life ==
The young Otto's marked preference was for literature, theatre, pretty actresses and all the cultural life of Prague which was very active at that time. He frequented fashionable cafés such as the Arco and the Continental, where he rubbed shoulders with the young intelligentsia who spoke only of social or artistic revolution. Helped by a regularly paid allowance by his father, Otto frequented the avant-garde (Franz Kafka, Max Brod, Franz Werfel) and led a life of pleasure in 1922 while adhering to the German Communist Party. Thanks to his allowance, he published some poems privately. Rudolf Fuchs, a German Jewish writer, encouraged him to become a writer. He was also close to Egon Kisch with whom he shared communist political views.

He met a leftist actress Sonya Bogsová, whom he married but their communist activities monitored by the Prague authorities encouraged them to settle in Berlin in 1921. Despite the birth of a daughter Petra, the marriage was strained by the frenzy of the German capital in the 1920s.

== Agitprop with Willi Münzenberg ==
Through a meeting in 1924 with Babette Gross, the sister of Margarete Buber-Neumann, Otto Katz met Willi Münzenberg, Babette's husband. Münzenberg saw Otto Katz's potential and included within his group the young dandy eager to serve the cause of the Soviet Union.

== Death ==
He was tried under the name André Simone in the Slánský trial, convicted and eventually hanged in the Ruzyně Prison at 3am on 3 December 1952. His body was cremated and his ashes were scattered beside a small road near Prague.
