= Týn nad Vltavou =

- Town
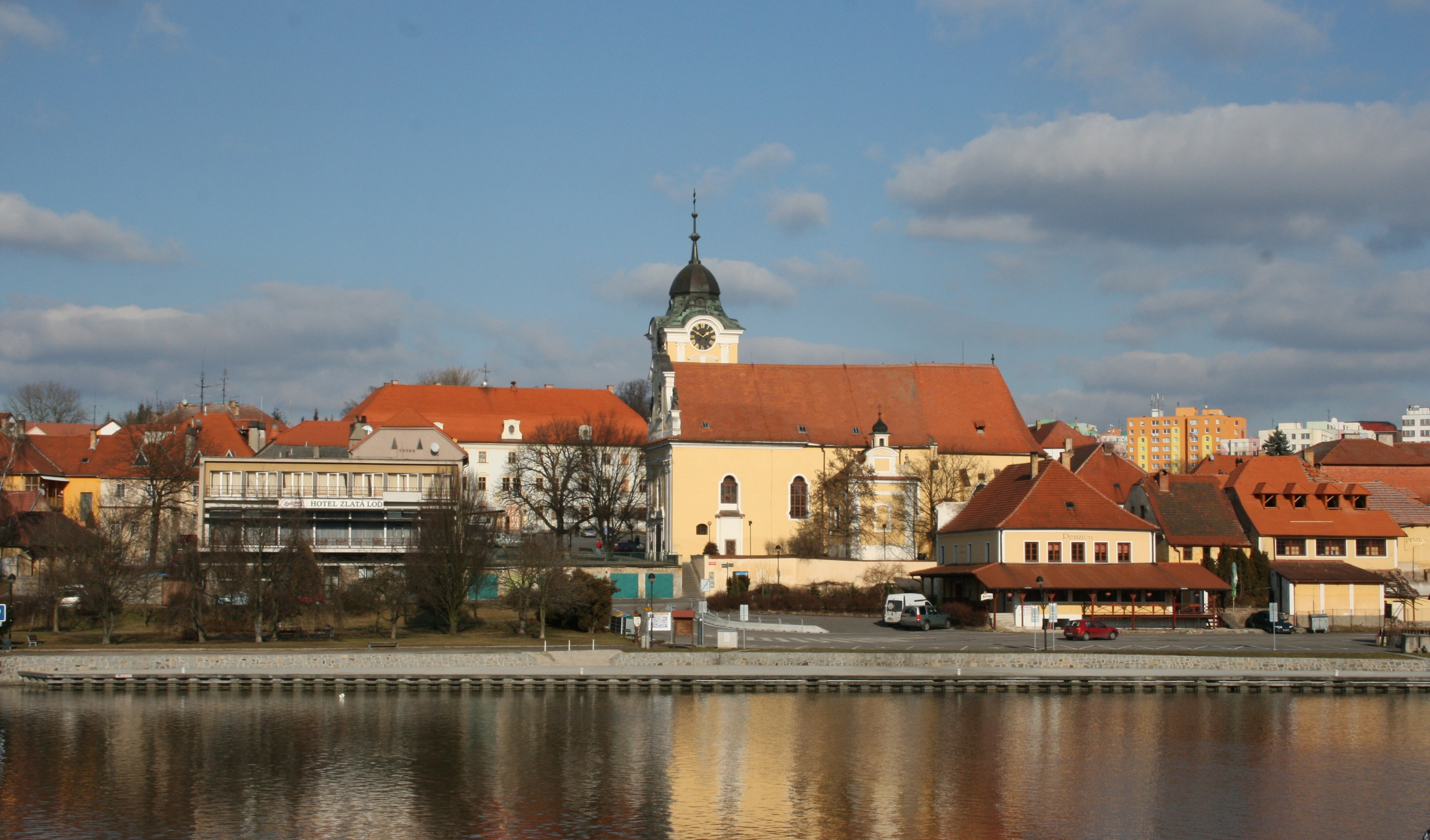
- View over the Vltava River

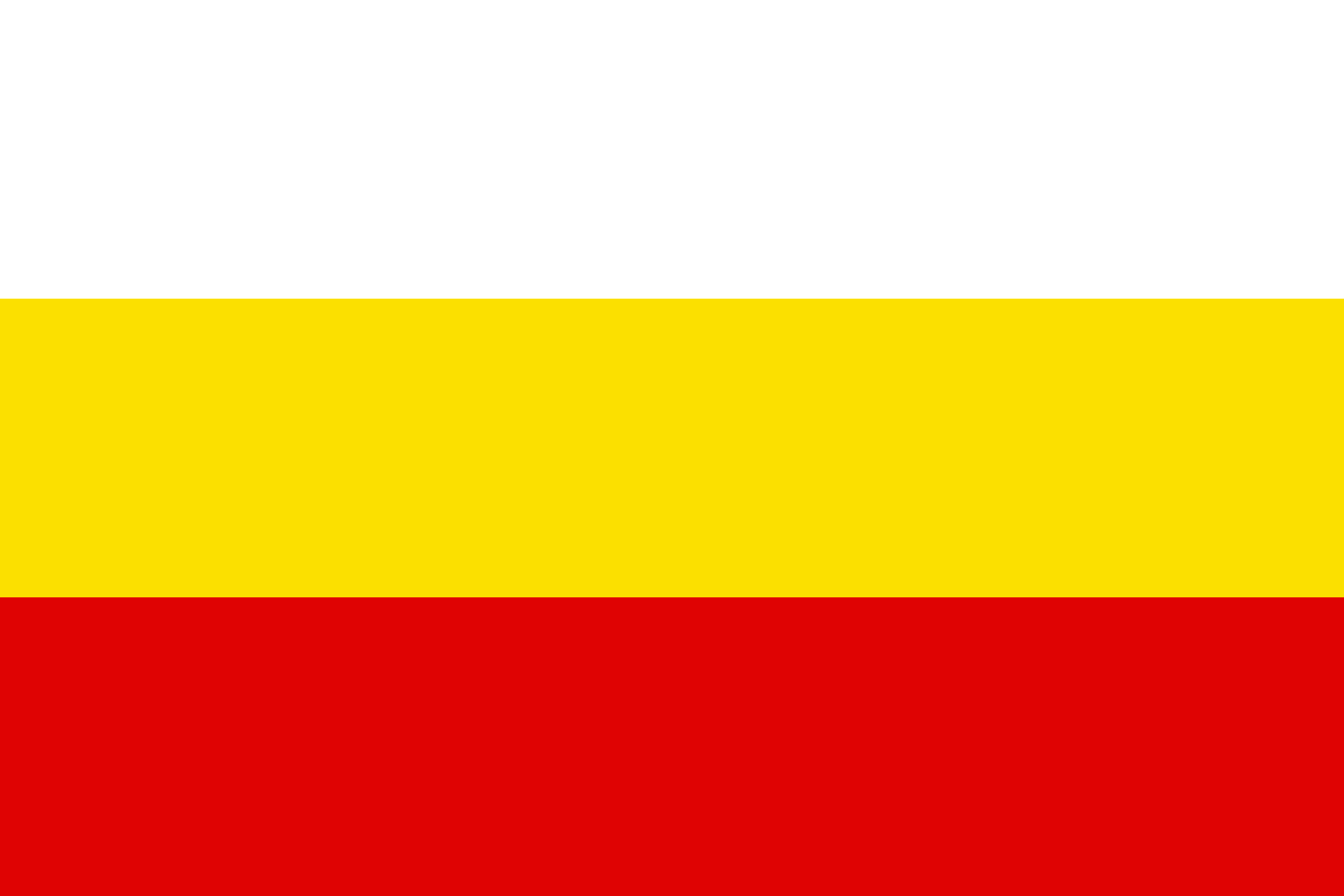
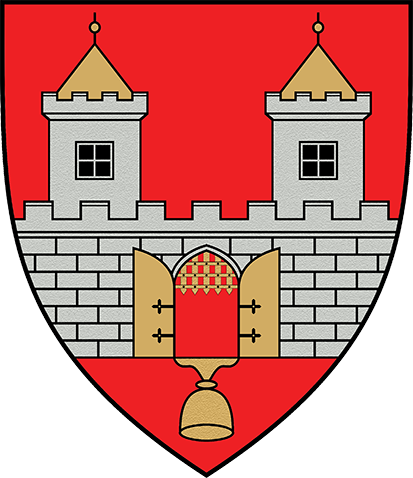
- Flag Coat of arms

- Location in the Czech Republic
- Coordinates: 49°13′25″N 14°25′14″E
- Country: Czech Republic
- Region: South Bohemian
- District: České Budějovice
- First mentioned: 1229

Government
  - Mayor: Karel Hladeček

Area
  - Total: 43.02 km^{2} (16.61 sq mi)
- Elevation: 362 m (1,188 ft)

Population (2026-01-01)
  - Total: 7,728
  - Density: 179.6/km^{2} (465.3/sq mi)
- Time zone: UTC+1 (CET)
  - Summer (DST): UTC+2 (CEST)
- Postal code: 375 01
- Website: www.tnv.cz

Týn nad Vltavou (Czech pronunciation: [ˈtiːn ˈnad vl̩tavou]; German: Moldautein) is a town in České Budějovice District in the South Bohemian Region of the Czech Republic. It has about 7,700 inhabitants. The town is located on the Vltava River in the Tábor Uplands.

Týn nad Vltavou became a town in 1327 at the latest. The historic town centre is well preserved and is protected as an urban monument zone.

== Administrative division ==
Týn nad Vltavou consists of eight municipal parts (in brackets population according to the 2021 census):

- Týn nad Vltavou (4,407)
- Hněvkovice na levém břehu Vltavy (67)
- Koloděje nad Lužnicí (189)
- Malá Strana (2,610)
- Netěchovice (106)
- Nuzice (113)
- Předčice (74)
- Vesce (36)

== Etymology ==
The Old Czech word týn is related to English 'town'. It was a term for a fortified settlement.

== Geography ==
Týn nad Vltavou is located about 26 kilometres (16 mi) north of České Budějovice. It lies in the Tábor Uplands. The highest point is the hill Červený vrch at 479 m (1,572 ft) above sea level. The town is situated on the Vltava River, at its confluence with the Lužnice.

== History ==
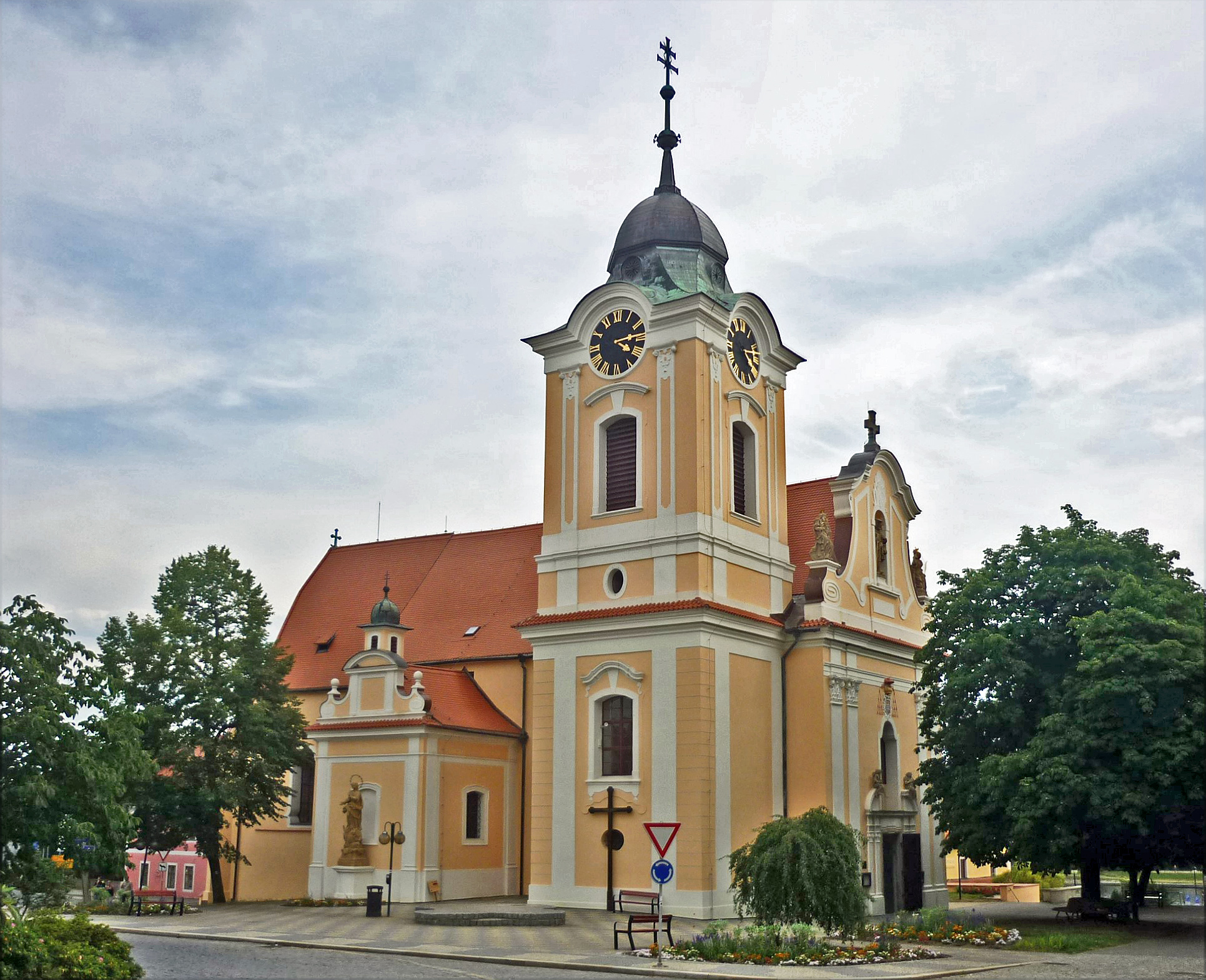
Church of Saint James the Great

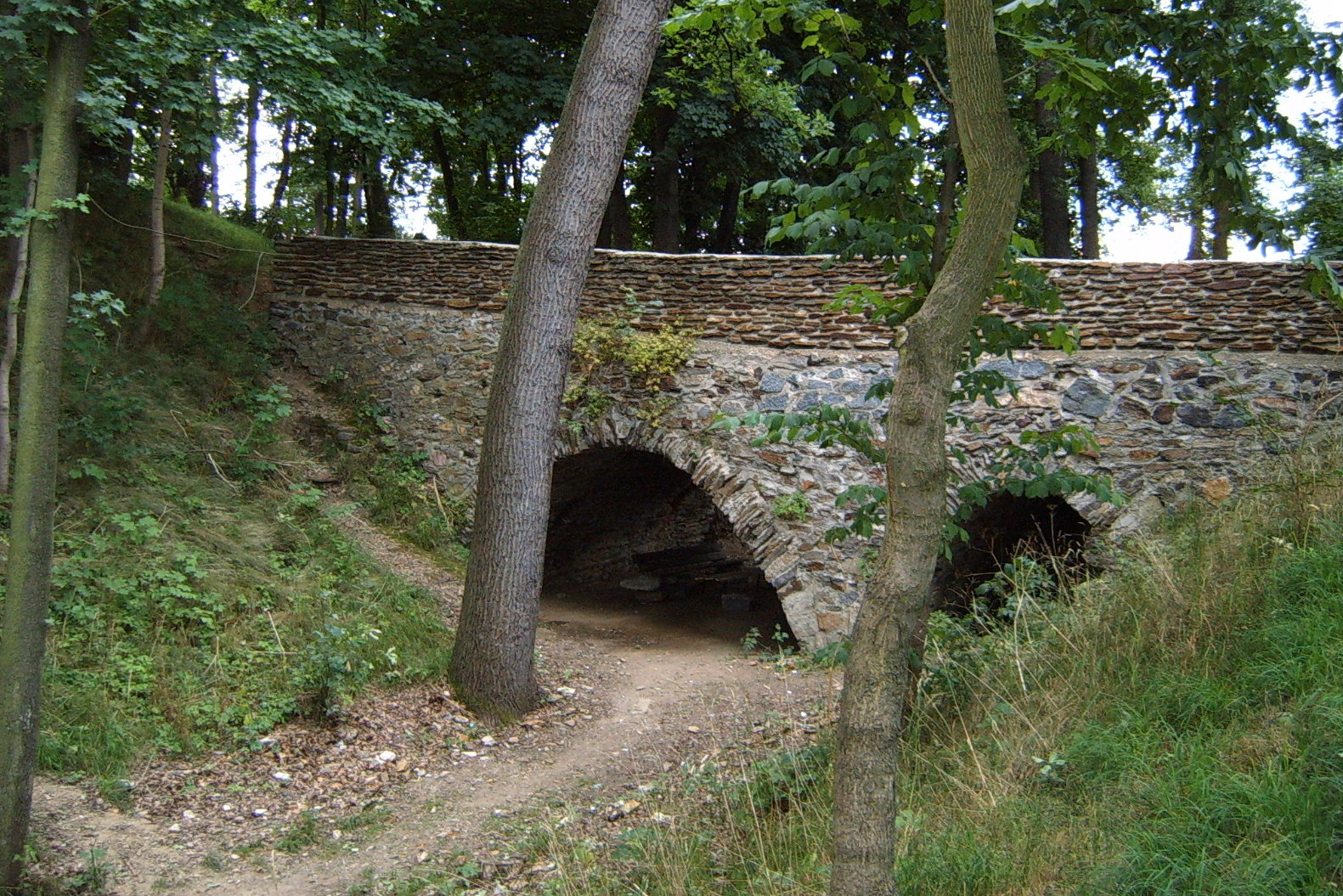
Gothic castle ruins

A settlement in the area was probably founded in the 11th century. The first written mention of Týn nad Vltavou is from 1229, when it was a part of bishop's dominion. After 1251, a new centre of the settlement was established and built around the Church of Saint Christoforos, near a road connecting two local fords. The fords were replaced by a wooden bridge.

In the late 13th century, a development occurred, and a stone castle for protection of the trade route from Nuremberg to Vienna was built. In 1327, Týn nad Vltavou was first referred to as a town. The town acquired a customs office authorising the collection of tolls, the connection with Prague was ensured by rafting and boating on the Vltava, and Týn became rich and prospering.

During the Hussite Wars, the church was burned down, otherwise the town was not affected by the war. However, the town was affected by later religious disputes and wars and was burned down in 1468. After 1543 during the rule of Jan III Čabelický, the desolated castle was repaired. In 1564, a large fire destroyed most of the houses on the square and the church. In 1569, the church was rebuilt, extended and consecrated to James the Great.

In 1601, Týn was confiscated by the royal chamber. In 1608, it was promoted to a royal town by Rudolf II, but in 1621 after the Battle of White Mountain, it was returned to the Prague archbishopric and became again a serfdom town. During the Thirty Years' War, the town was repeatedly burned and devastated. The town lost two thirds of the houses and the castle. The decline continued after the war, and in 1680 the town was hit by a plague epidemic.

== Demographics ==
Historical population

Year	Pop.	±%
1869	6,128	—
1880	6,468	+5.5%
1890	5,873	−9.2%
1900	5,722	−2.6%
1910	5,390	−5.8%

Year	Pop.	±%
1921	5,392	+0.0%
1930	5,544	+2.8%
1950	5,050	−8.9%
1961	5,451	+7.9%
1970	5,299	−2.8%

Year	Pop.	±%
1980	5,711	+7.8%
1991	6,831	+19.6%
2001	8,143	+19.2%
2011	8,021	−1.5%
2021	7,602	−5.2%

Source: Censuses

== Transport ==
There are no major roads passing through the municipality. The railway that starts here is unused.

== Sights ==
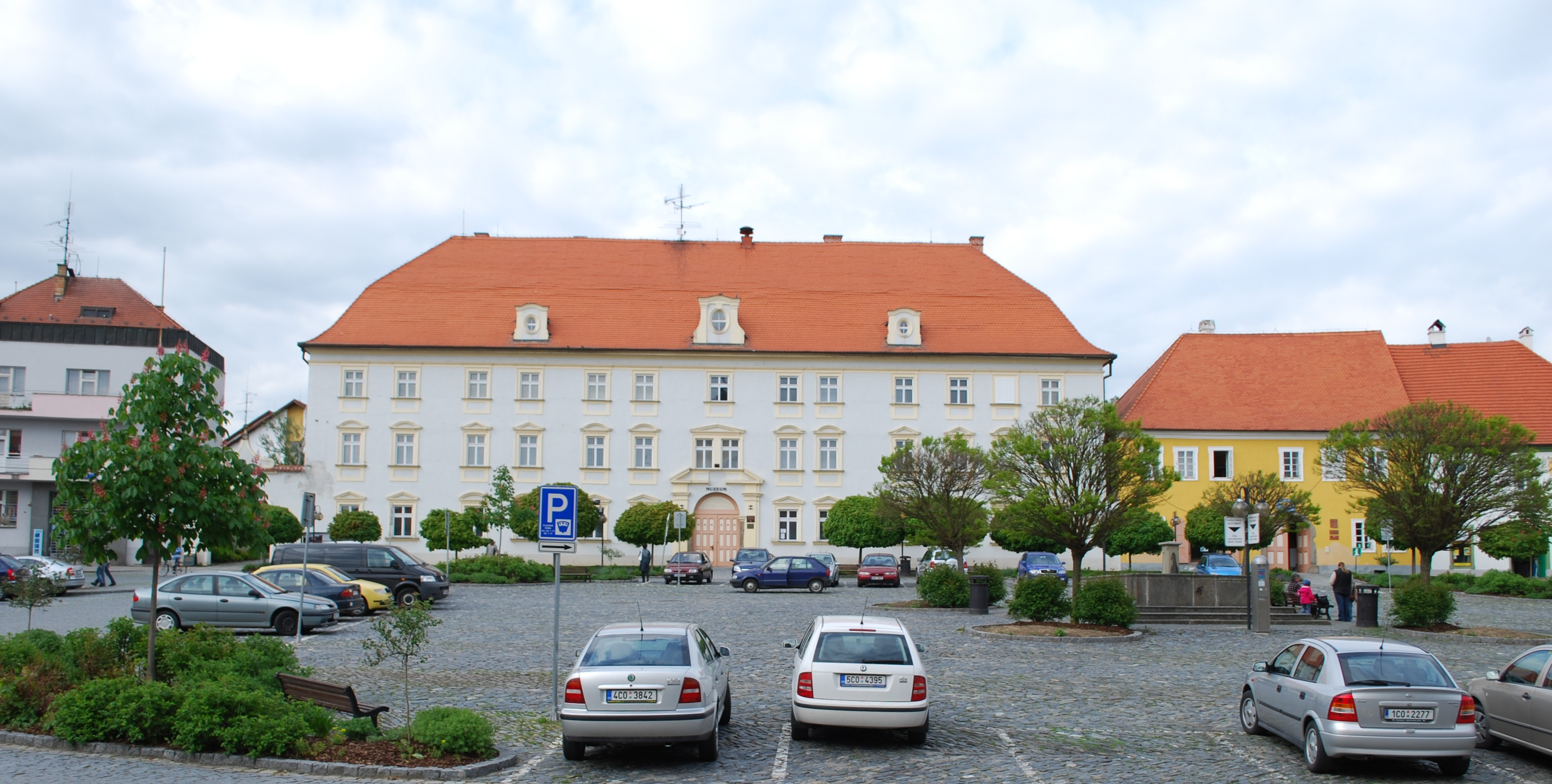
Square with Týn nad Vltavou Castle

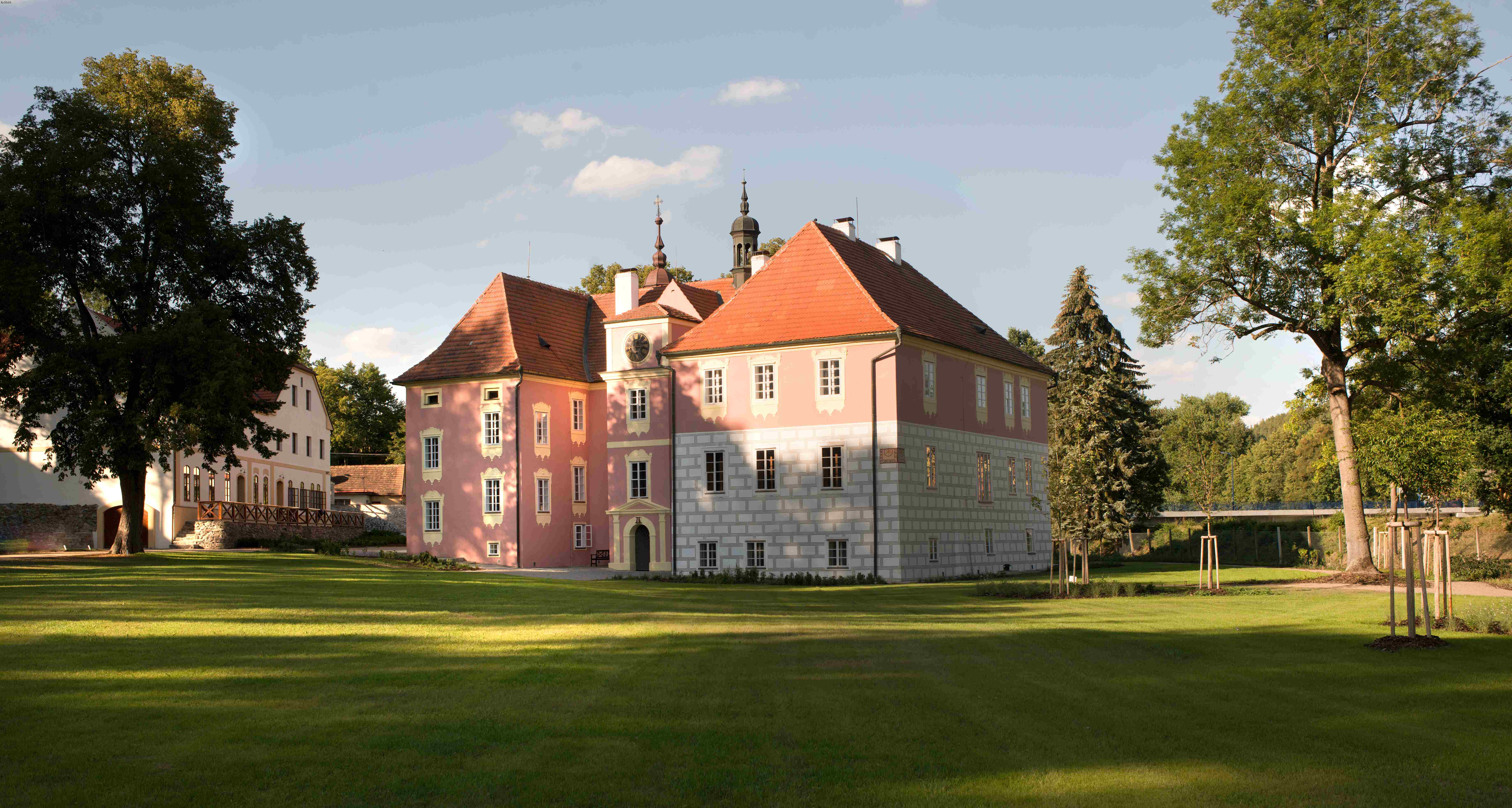
Koloděje nad Lužnicí Castle

The historic centre is formed by the square Náměstí Míru with many preserved Renaissance and Gothic-Renaissance houses, and adjacent streets. The main landmarks of the square are the town hall, the church, and the castle. The Renaissance town hall was built in the 17th century and rebuilt after a fire in 1796. The façade of the building in the late Baroque style was lightened by arcades.

The Church of Saint James the Great comes from 1569 was reconstructed in the Baroque style in 1753–1763.

Týn nad Vltavou Castle is the largest building in the town centre. It was built in 1699 as seat of the archbishop's administration. The building has an early Baroque façade with Neoclassical adjustments. The castle also includes underground spaces open to the public. Today the castle houses a library and the Town Museum Týn nad Vltavou. The museum was founded in 1932 and consists of expositions of local history, historical puppets, moldavites, and life and work of Alfréd Radok.

The remains of the original Gothic castle are accessible. Only a stone bridge and few ramparts are preserved. On the site of a former castle, a revolving auditorium was built in 1983. It is the only amateur scene of its kind in the world.

Smaller castles Hněvkovice and Koloděje nad Lužnicí are located in the eponymous villages.

== In popular culture ==
Zdeněk Troška's films Kameňák, Kameňák 2 and Kameňák 3 were filmed in the town.

== Notable people ==
- Matěj Kopecký (1775–1847), puppeteer; lived and died here
- Alfréd Radok (1914–1976), stage director and film director
