= Libčany =

- Municipality
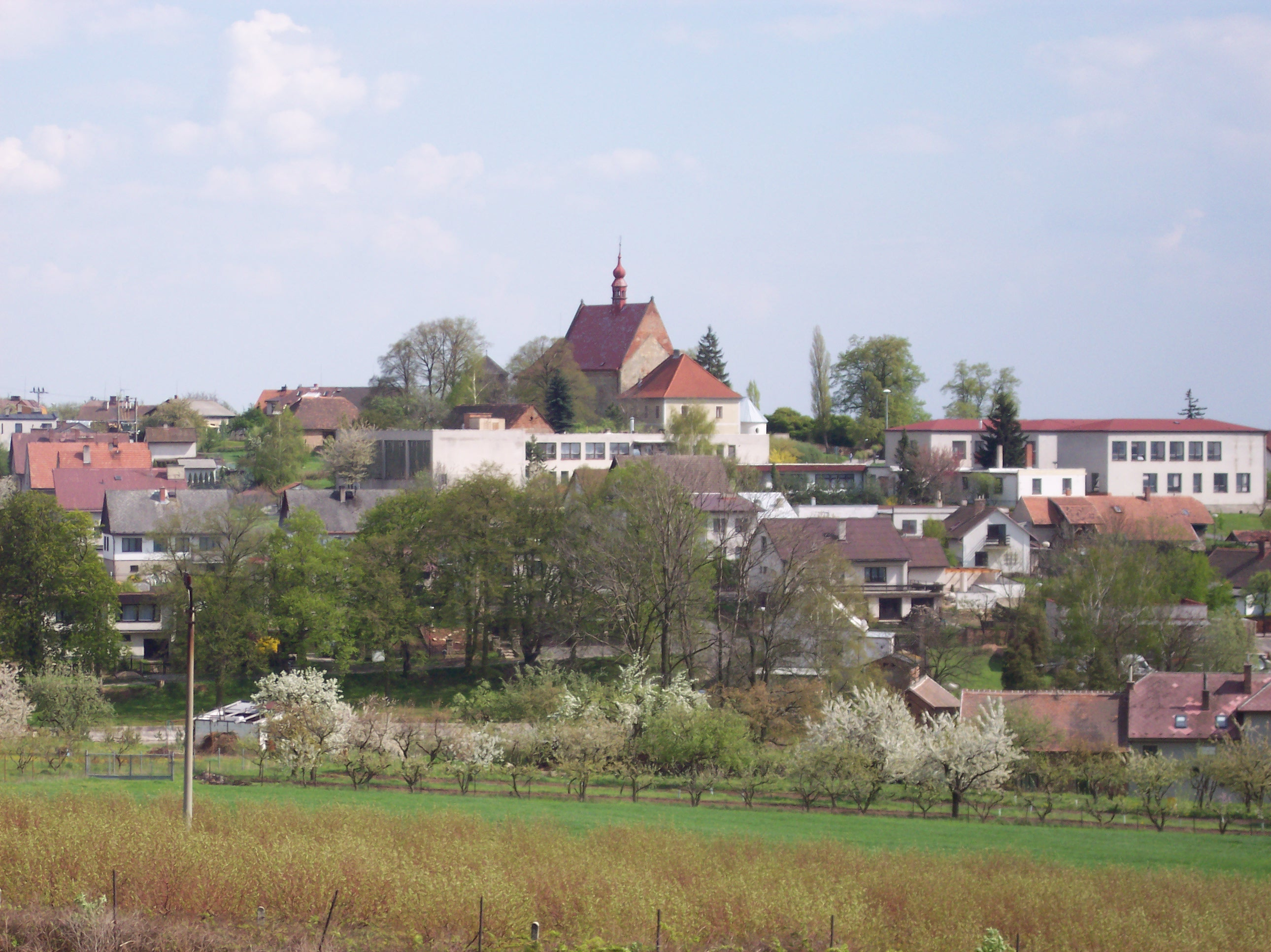
- Panorama of Libčany

- Flag Coat of arms

- Location in the Czech Republic
- Coordinates: 50°11′30″N 15°41′42″E
- Country: Czech Republic
- Region: Hradec Králové
- District: Hradec Králové
- First mentioned: 1073

Area
  - Total: 5.06 km^{2} (1.95 sq mi)
- Elevation: 264 m (866 ft)

Population (2026-01-01)
  - Total: 979
  - Density: 193/km^{2} (501/sq mi)
- Time zone: UTC+1 (CET)
  - Summer (DST): UTC+2 (CEST)
- Postal codes: 503 22, 503 27
- Website: www.libcany.cz

Libčany is a municipality and village in Hradec Králové District in the Hradec Králové Region of the Czech Republic. It has about 1,000 inhabitants.

== Administrative division ==
Libčany consists of two municipal parts (in brackets population according to the 2021 census):

- Libčany (777)
- Želí (91)

== Etymology ==
The name Libčany is derived from the personal name Libek, meaning "the village of Libek's people".

== Geography ==
Libčany is located about 9 kilometres (6 mi) west of Hradec Králové. It lies in the East Elbe Table. The highest point is at 290 m (951 ft) above sea level.

== History ==
The first written mention of Libčany is from 1073. The village was owned by various noble families and the owners often changed. Among the most important owners were the Dobřenský of Dobřenice family at the end of the 15th century and the city of hradec Králové in the second half of the 16th century. The nobility resided in the fortress, which was rebuilt into a Renaissance castle in the mid-16th century, but in 1775 the castle was ravaged during a peasant rebellion.

== Demographics ==
Historical population

| Year | Pop. | ±% |
|---|---|---|
| 1869 | 706 | — |
| 1880 | 717 | +1.6% |
| 1890 | 725 | +1.1% |
| 1900 | 686 | −5.4% |
| 1910 | 701 | +2.2% |

| Year | Pop. | ±% |
|---|---|---|
| 1921 | 654 | −6.7% |
| 1930 | 738 | +12.8% |
| 1950 | 604 | −18.2% |
| 1961 | 605 | +0.2% |
| 1970 | 552 | −8.8% |

| Year | Pop. | ±% |
|---|---|---|
| 1980 | 612 | +10.9% |
| 1991 | 743 | +21.4% |
| 2001 | 776 | +4.4% |
| 2011 | 844 | +8.8% |
| 2021 | 868 | +2.8% |

Source: Censuses

== Transport ==
There are no railways or major roads passing through the municipality.

== Sights ==
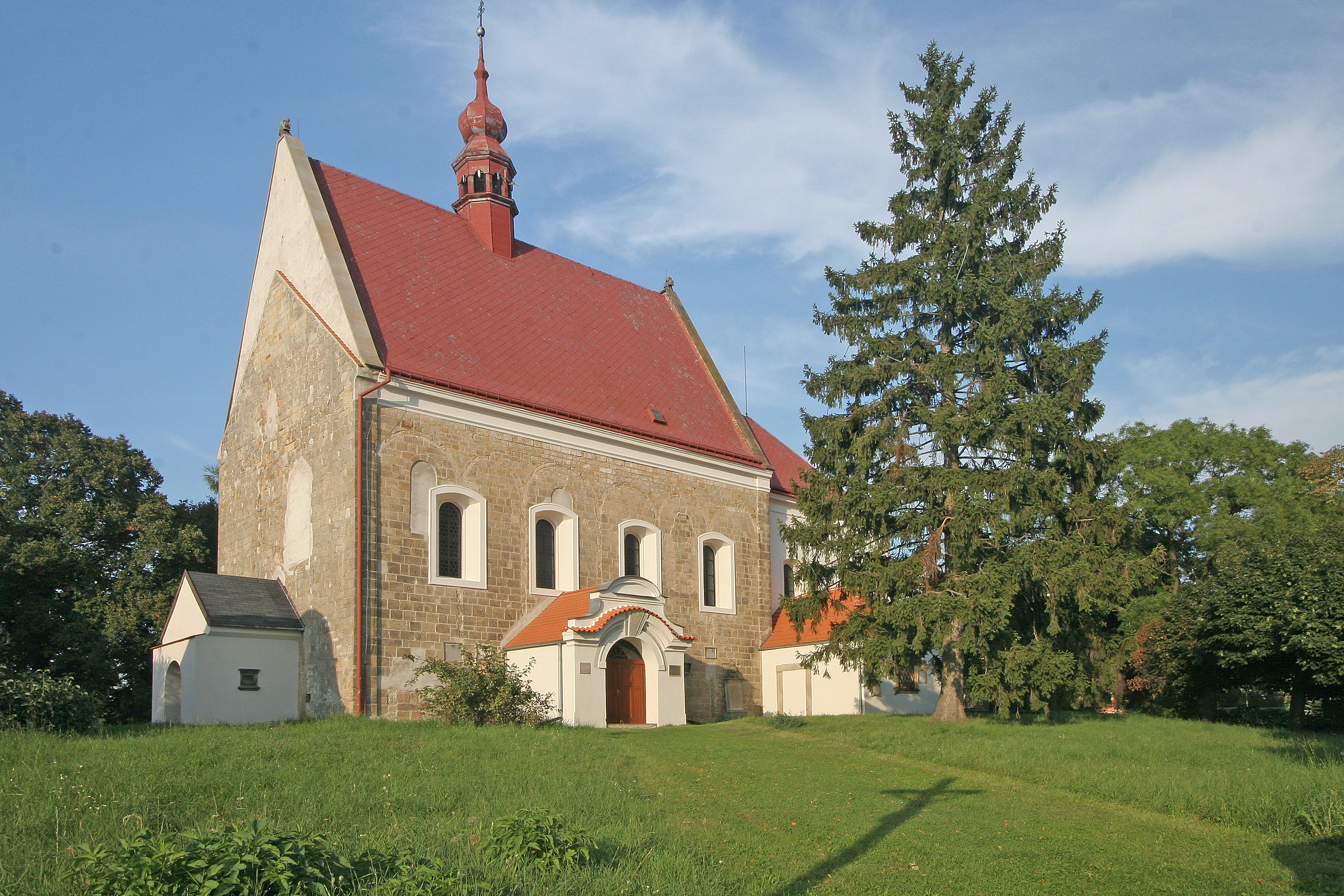
Church of the Assumption of the Virgin Mary

The main landmark od Libčany is the Church of the Assumption of the Virgin Mary. It is originally a Romanesque church from around 1225, modified in the Gothic style at the turn of the 15th and 16th centuries. The interior was rebuilt in Baroque style at the end of the 17th century. The Romanesque core and many Romanesque elements have been preserved to this day. Next to the church are a Baroque mortuary, a Baroque rectory and a modern belfry.

== Notable people ==
- Matěj Kopecký (1775–1847), puppeteer

== Twin towns – sister cities ==
Libčany is twinned with:

- Le Mêle-sur-Sarthe, France
