= Jistebnice hymn book =

c. 1430 Czech Hussite song collection

Jistebnice Kancionál
- Prague, National Museum (II C 7)
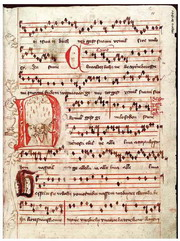
- Jistebnice hymn book
- Date: 1420s
- Place of origin: Bohemia, Holy Roman Empire
- Language(s): Czech, Latin
- Material: paper
- Size: 132 leaves
- Format: 31 x 21 cm
- Previously kept: Jistebnice
- Discovered: 1872 by Leopold Katz

The Jistebnice hymn book (Czech: Jistebnický kancionál) is a Czech hand-written hymnbook from around 1430 and the earliest witness to a concentrated effort to translate the liturgy of the Western Church into the vernacular.

== Content ==
The Jistebnice hymn book is the largest surviving compendium and the most important source of Hussite liturgy and singing in the Czech lands. It contains Czech translations of Latin liturgy, religious hymns, songs to be sung at vespers and also Czech folk Christmas carols.

It also contains the first record of the Hussite war song Ktož jsú boží bojovníci.

== Storage ==
The manuscript is deposited in the Prague National Museum. A copy of the manuscript is in a gallery in Jistebnice, where the manuscript was found.

== See also ==
- List of English-language hymnals by denomination

== Literature ==
- Holeton, David; Kolár, Jaroslav; Vidmanová, Anežka; Vlhová-Wörner, Hana (2005). Jistebnický kancionál: MS. Praha, Knihovna Národního muzea, II C 7: kritická edice = Jistebnice kancionál : MS. Prague, National Museum Library II C 7: critical edition. 1. svazek, Graduale. Brno: L. Marek. ISBN 80-86263-56-8.
