= Rataje (Tábor District) =

- Municipality
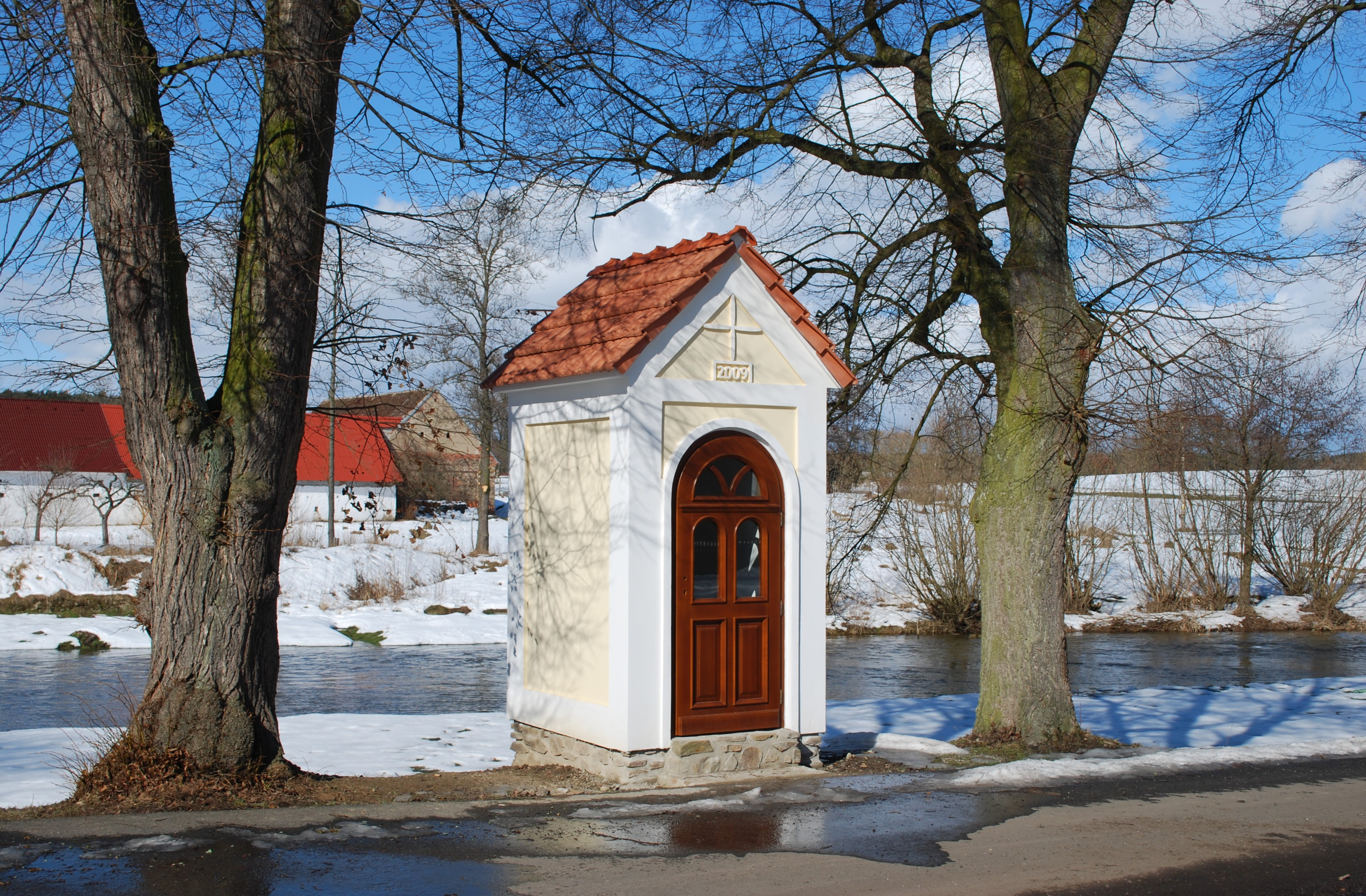
- Chapel in the village

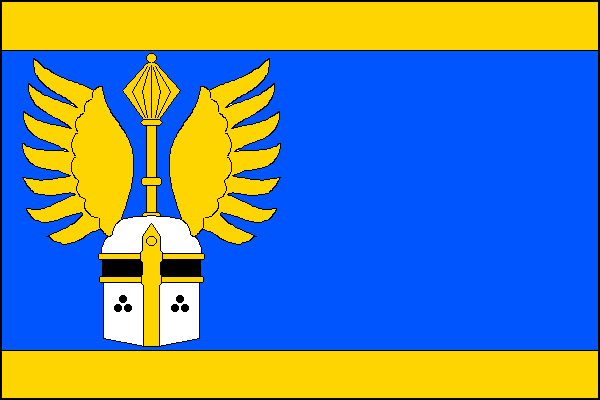
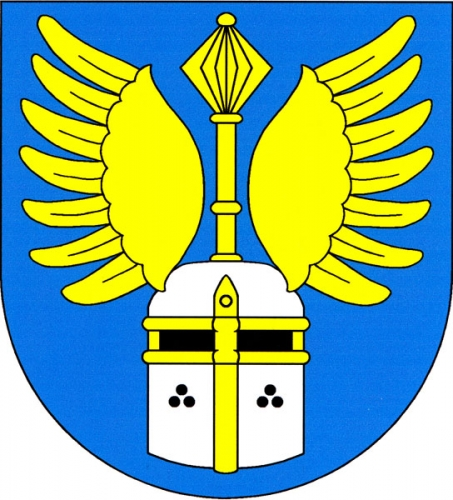
- Flag Coat of arms

- Location in the Czech Republic
- Coordinates: 49°21′0″N 14°26′45″E
- Country: Czech Republic
- Region: South Bohemian
- District: Tábor
- First mentioned: 1352

Area
  - Total: 10.77 km^{2} (4.16 sq mi)
- Elevation: 405 m (1,329 ft)

Population (2026-01-01)
  - Total: 222
  - Density: 20.6/km^{2} (53.4/sq mi)
- Time zone: UTC+1 (CET)
  - Summer (DST): UTC+2 (CEST)
- Postal code: 391 65
- Website: www.ratajeobec.cz

Rataje is a municipality and village in Tábor District in the South Bohemian Region of the Czech Republic. It has about 200 inhabitants.

Rataje lies approximately 17 kilometres (11 mi) south-west of Tábor, 42 km (26 mi) north of České Budějovice, and 82 km (51 mi) south of Prague.

== Administrative division ==
Rataje consists of two municipal parts (in brackets population according to the 2021 census):

- Rataje (168)
- Kozín (9)

== Etymology ==
The name Rataje is derived from the Old Czech word rataj, i.e. 'ploughman', 'farmer'.

== Demographics ==
Historical population
Year	Pop.	±%
1869	588	—
1880	587	−0.2%
1890	518	−11.8%
1900	544	+5.0%
1910	575	+5.7%
1921	522	−9.2%
1930	503	−3.6%
1950	337	−33.0%
1961	362	+7.4%
1970	309	−14.6%
1980	259	−16.2%
1991	224	−13.5%
2001	200	−10.7%
2011	191	−4.5%
2021	177	−7.3%
Source: Censuses
