= Zběšičky =

- Municipality
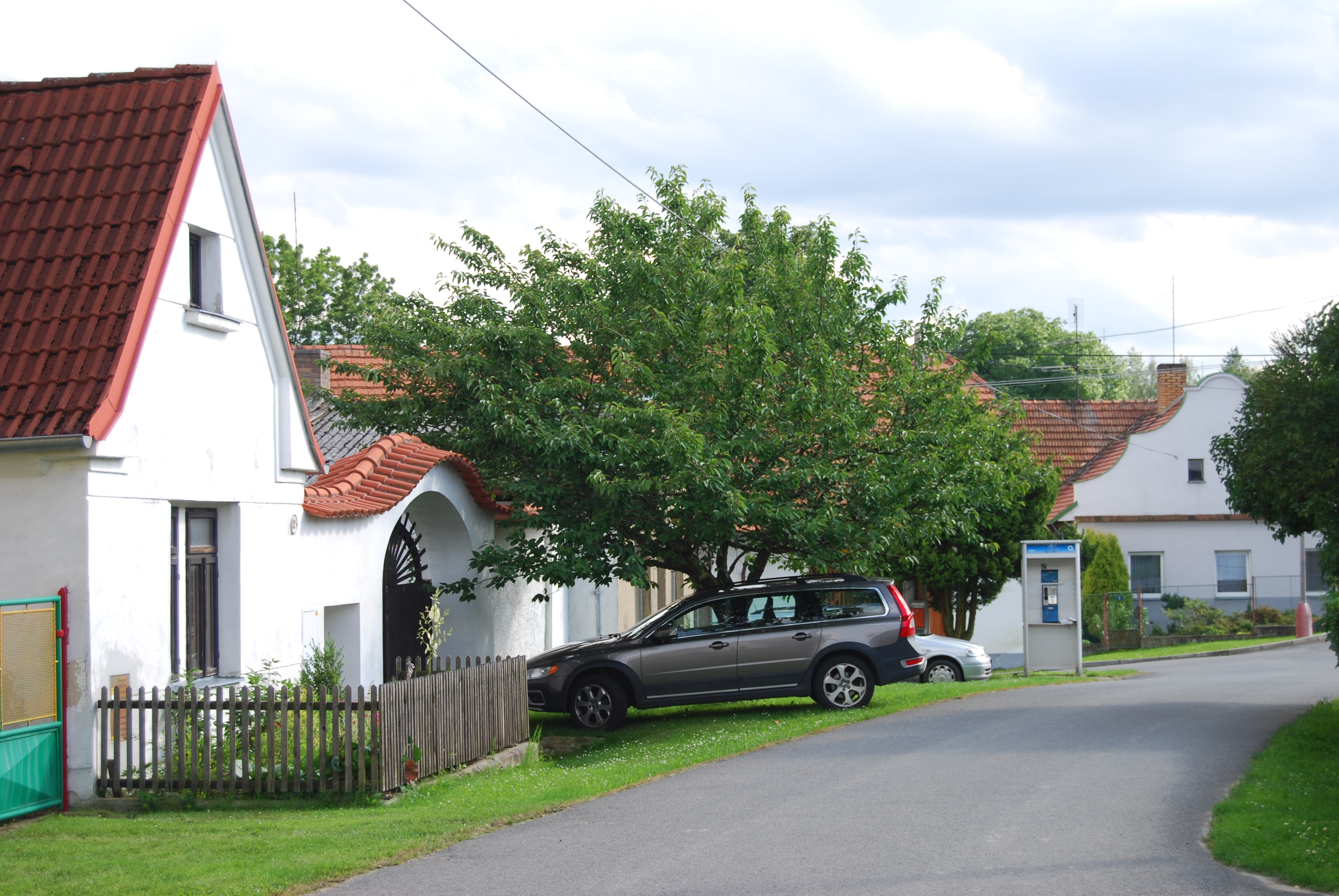
- A street in Zběšičky

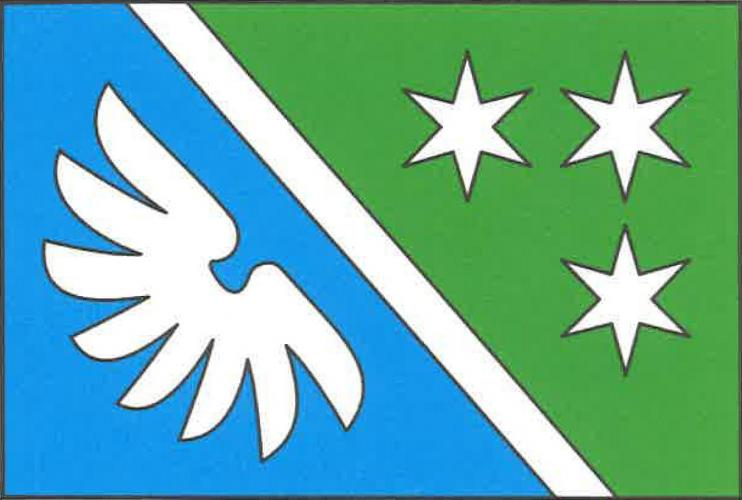
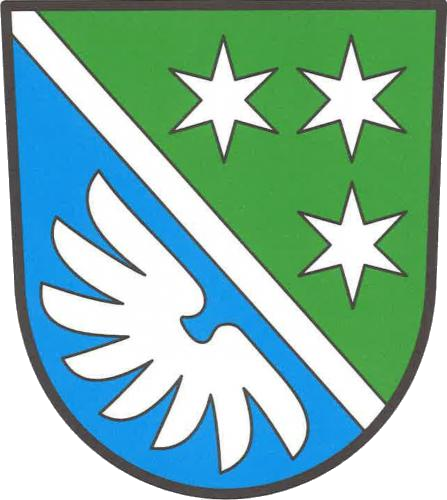
- Flag Coat of arms

- Location in the Czech Republic
- Coordinates: 49°23′33″N 14°25′35″E
- Country: Czech Republic
- Region: South Bohemian
- District: Písek
- First mentioned: 1215

Area
  - Total: 5.92 km^{2} (2.29 sq mi)
- Elevation: 463 m (1,519 ft)

Population (2026-01-01)
  - Total: 165
  - Density: 27.9/km^{2} (72.2/sq mi)
- Time zone: UTC+1 (CET)
  - Summer (DST): UTC+2 (CEST)
- Postal code: 398 43
- Website: www.obeczbesicky.cz

Zběšičky is a municipality and village in Písek District in the South Bohemian Region of the Czech Republic. It has about 200 inhabitants.

Zběšičky lies approximately 24 kilometres (15 mi) north-east of Písek, 47 km (29 mi) north of České Budějovice, and 78 km (48 mi) south of Prague.

== Administrative division ==
Zběšičky consists of three municipal parts (in brackets population according to the 2021 census):

- Zběšičky (154)
- Hanov (2)
- Popovec (10)

== Demographics ==
Historical population
Year	Pop.	±%
1869	463	—
1880	436	−5.8%
1890	411	−5.7%
1900	379	−7.8%
1910	388	+2.4%
1921	381	−1.8%
1930	347	−8.9%
1950	238	−31.4%
1961	223	−6.3%
1970	179	−19.7%
1980	113	−36.9%
1991	135	+19.5%
2001	136	+0.7%
2011	162	+19.1%
2021	166	+2.5%
Source: Censuses
