= Josef Richard Vilímek (1860–1938) =

Czech publisher

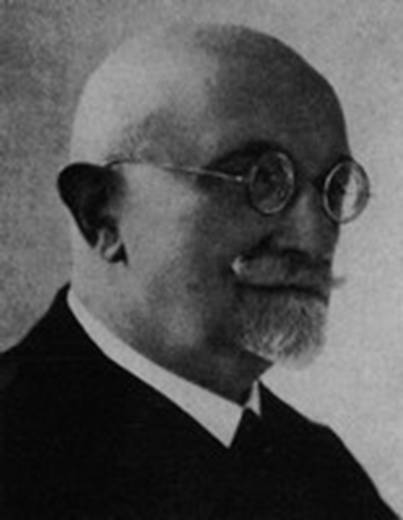
- Josef Richard Vilímek (1860-1938)
- Born: September 14, 1860; Prague
- Died: November 6, 1938 (aged 78); Prague
- Occupation: Book publisher
- Known for: Publishing novels of Jules Verne, Karl May, and Arthur Conan Doyle

Josef Richard Vilímek (14 September 1860 – 6 November 1938) was a Czech publisher. He was owner of the famous publishing house J. R. Vilímek.

== Life ==
Vilímek was born in Prague. His father, Josef Richard Vilímek (1835–1911), was the head of the family-owned publishing house Josef Richard Vilimek. Vilímek junior learned the business in his father's firm, as well as periods abroad. In 1885 he took over the firm, and expanded its production to become one of the best-known Czech publishers of the time (together with Jan Otto and František Topič). Among its most popular titles were novels by Jules Verne (52 books in several editions), Karl May, and Arthur Conan Doyle. In 1891 he became the first publisher in Czech lands using a rotary printing press. In 1899 a fire destroyed the company's building, but the company survived. In the late 1920s the building and technology were modernized.

Starting in the late 1920s, the painter Zdeněk Burian illustrated many of Vilímek's books. Vilímek died in Prague in 1938, after which Bedřich Fučík managed the company. He continued running the company during World War II.

After the Communist takeover in 1948 the company was nationalised, and in 1949 it ceased operation. The building and technology were handed over to a large state publisher Knižní velkoobchod. After the Communist Party fell from power (1989) the now forgotten name J. R. Vilímek was picked up and misused during a privatisation scandal (known for participation of a Czech politician Miroslav Macek).
