= Josef Richard Vilímek (1835–1911) =

Czech publisher

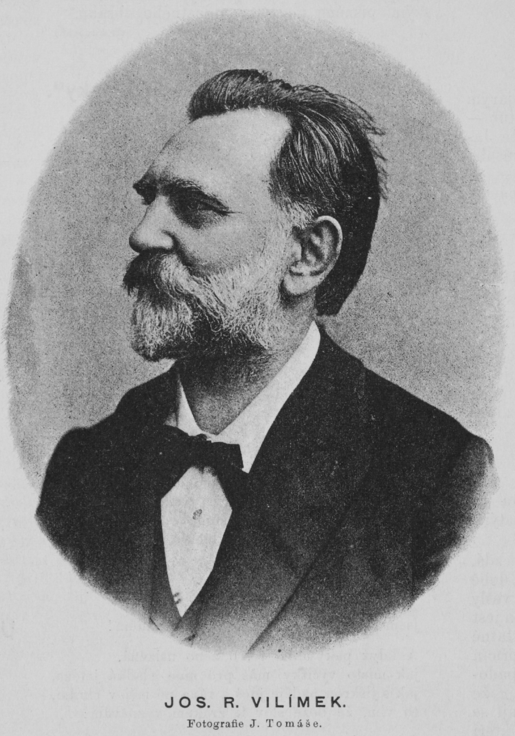
- Josef Richard Vilímek (1886)
- Born: 1 April 1835; Vamberk
- Died: 16 April 1911 (aged 76); Prague
- Occupation: Book publisher
- Known for: Publishing calendars, almanacs and plays of Matěj Kopecký

Josef Richard Vilímek (1 April 1835 in Vamberk – 16 April 1911 in Prague) was a Czech publisher. He established a well known publishing house and was father of publisher Josef Richard Vilímek (1860 - 1938).

Vilímek had studied at German technical university in Prague. From a young age he had shown literary talent and published poetry, fairy tales and articles in journals, under pseudonym Jan Velešovský. After his studies he worked as a journalist for several newspapers in Prague. In 1856 he was expelled from Prague for political reasons. In 1858 Vilímek and Josef Svátek founded political satire journal "Humoristické listy". In 1858 he and Josef Novák founded "Slavic Bookstore" (Slovanské knihkupectví) but left it in 1867. Publishing of calendars, almanacs and plays of Matěj Kopecký turned to be the most successful business. In 1868 Vilímek was elected into Bohemian parliament (český sněm). In 1872 Vilímek set up his own printing shop.

In 1884 he founded modern publishing house Josef Richard Vilímek, also known as Josef R. Vilímek, JR Vilímek or just Vilímek. Together with publishing houses of Jan Otto and František Topič Vilímek became one of the most famous publishers of the turn of 19/20th century.

In summer of 1885 Vilímek moved responsibility of the company to his son but stayed as editor and manager of "Humoristické listy" until 1906. In 1908 he published memoirs "Ze zašlých dob".
