= Tábor Uplands =

Topographic feature of the Czech Republic

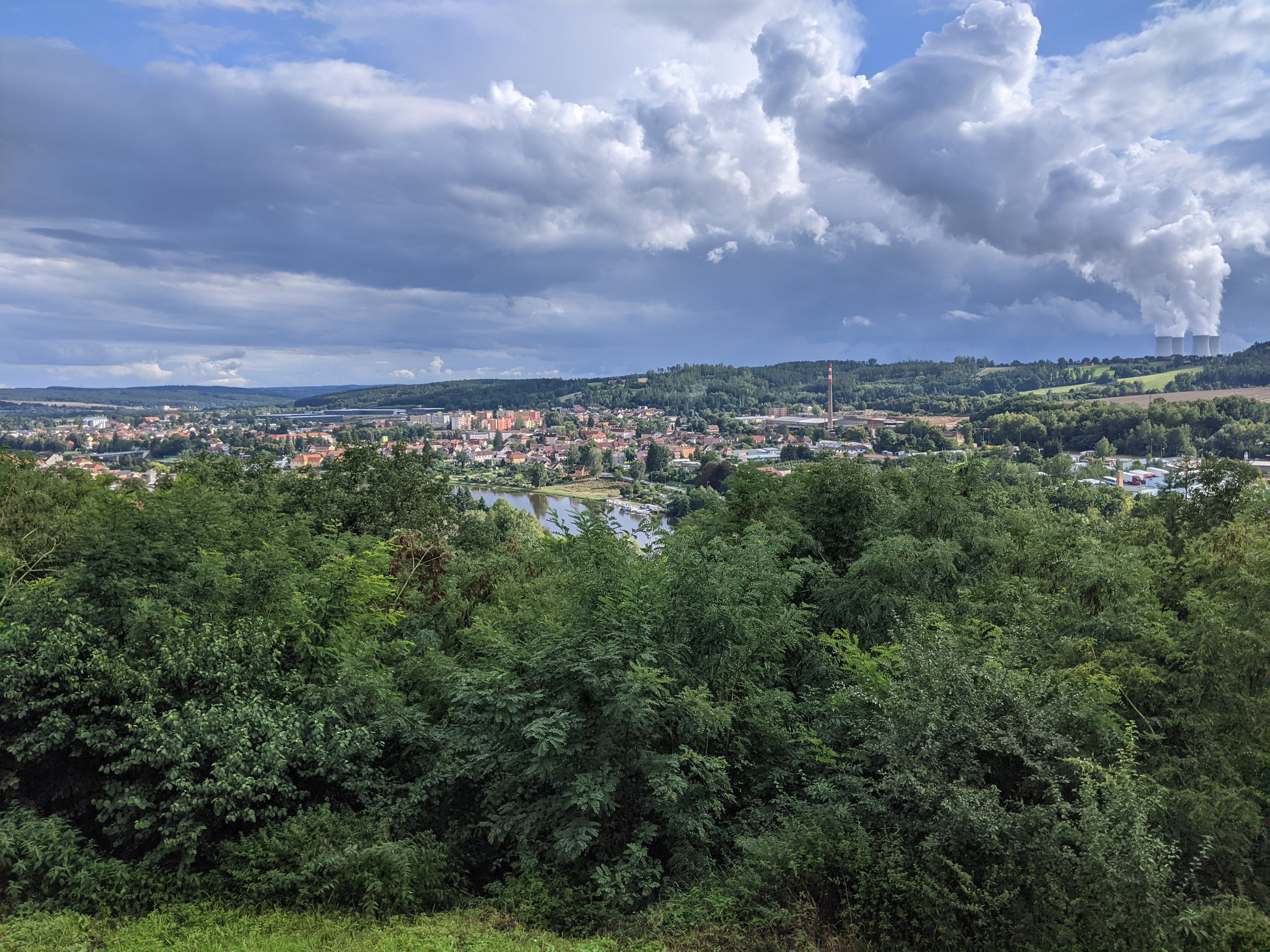
- Týn nad Vltavou and surrounding landscape

Highest point
- Peak: Velký Mehelník
- Elevation: 633 m (2,077 ft)

Dimensions
- Length: 50 km (31 mi)
- Area: 1,599 km^{2} (617 mi^{2})

Geography
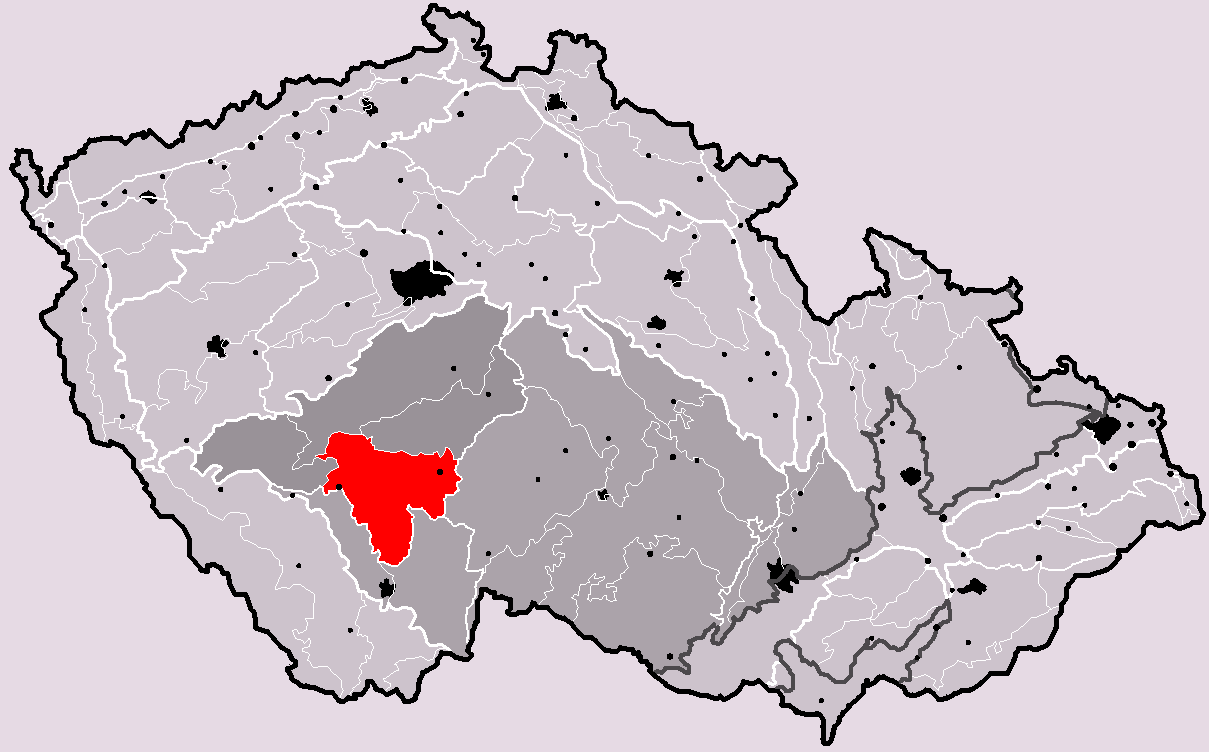
- Tábor Uplands in the geomorphological system of the Czech Republic
- Country: Czech Republic
- Region: South Bohemian
- Range coordinates: 49°19′N 14°26′E
- Parent range: Central Bohemian Hills

Geology
- Rock type(s): Syenite, granite

The Tábor Uplands (Czech: Táborská pahorkatina) are uplands and a geomorphological mesoregion of the Czech Republic. It is located in the South Bohemian Region. It is named after the town of Tábor.

== Geomorphology ==
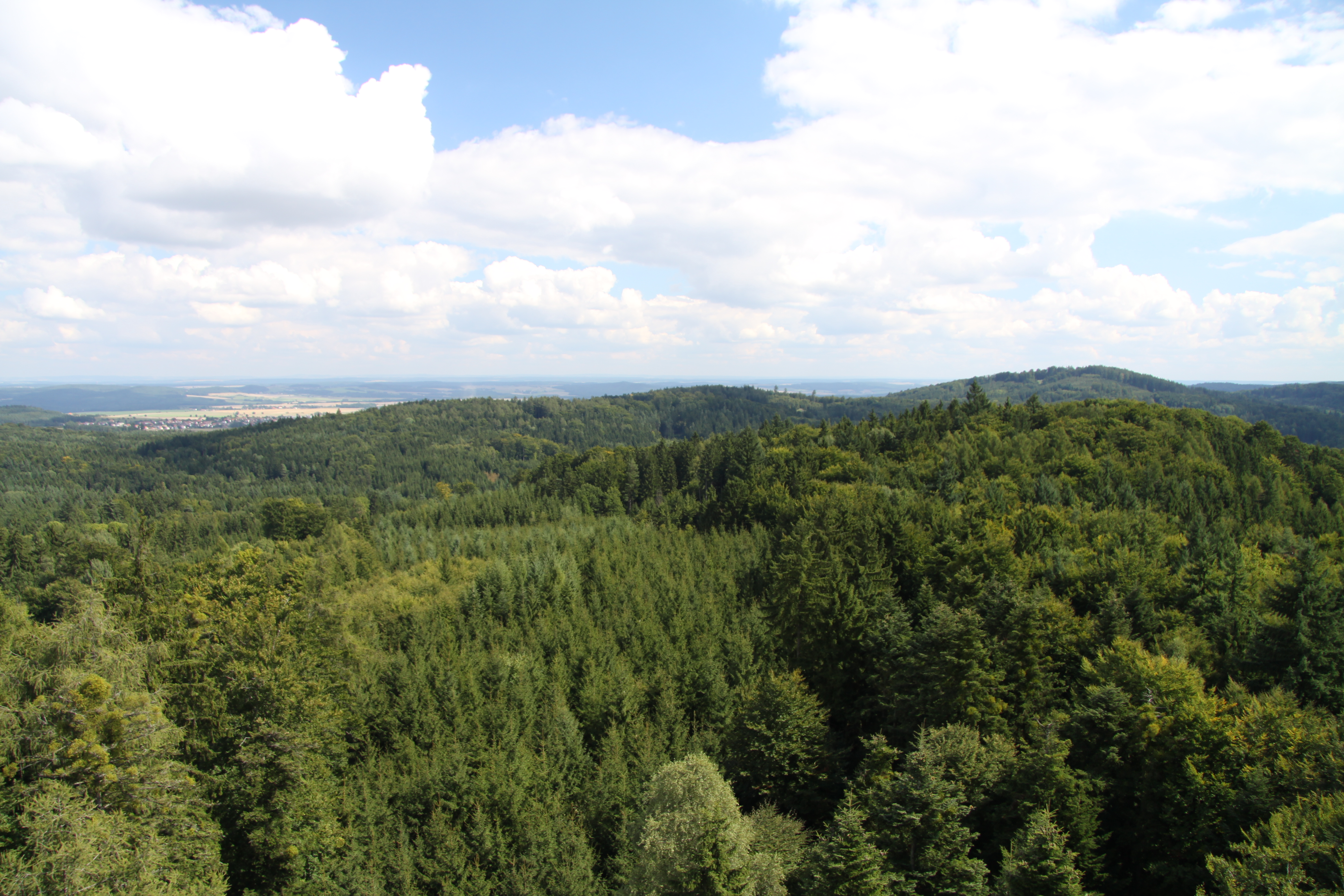
View from Jarník towards Velký Mehelník

The Tábor Uplands is a mesoregion of the Central Bohemian Hills within the Bohemian Massif. The relief is erosional-denudative, in some places tectonically disturbed. A typical element of the relief are river valleys, sometimes with Pleistocene terraces. The uplands are further subdivided into the microregions of Písek Uplands and Soběslav Uplands.

There are a lot of medium-high hills. The highest peaks are located in the western part of the territory. The highest peaks of the Tábor Uplands are:

- Velký Mehelník, 633 m (2,077 ft)
- Vysoký Kamýk, 630 m (2,070 ft)
- Pasecký vrch, 625 m (2,051 ft)
- Malý Kamýk, 623 m (2,044 ft)
- Srní homole, 613 m (2,011 ft)
- Provazce, 611 m (2,005 ft)
- Jarník, 609 m (1,998 ft)
- Bytina, 609 m (1,998 ft)
- Pecivál, 604 m (1,982 ft)
- Svícny, 599 m (1,965 ft)

== Geography ==
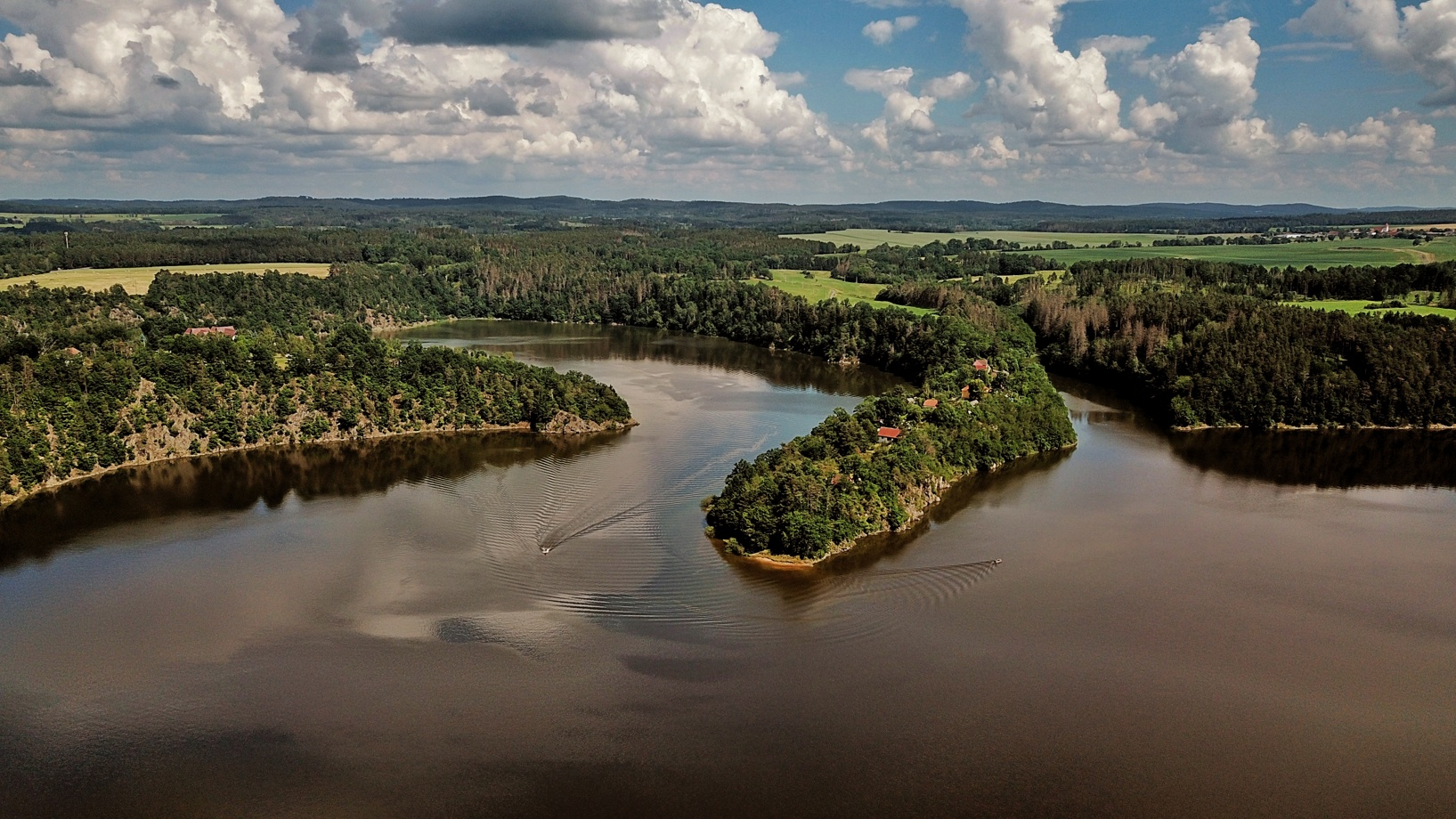
Northern part of Tábor Uplands with Orlík Reservoir

The Tábor Uplands lies in the South Bohemian Region. The territory has an area of 1,599 square kilometres (617 sq mi) and an average elevation of 449 metres (1,473 ft).

The territory is rich in watercourses. The axis of the territory are the Vltava, which flows from south to northwest, and its tributary Lužnice, which drains the eastern part of the uplands. Another notable rivers are the Otava, which flows to the Vltava from the west, and the Smutná, which flows to the Lužnice from the north.

The largest bodies of water are the reservoirs Hněvkovice and Orlík, built on the Vltava.

Suitable natural conditions contributed to the creation of many settlements in the Tábor Uplands. The most populated towns entirely located in the territory are Tábor, Týn nad Vltavou, Sezimovo Ústí, Bechyně and Planá nad Lužnicí. Most of Písek, Milevsko and Soběslav also lie in the uplands.

== Geology ==
The geological bedrock is dominated by granitoids, especially syenites.

== Protection of nature ==
There are no large-scale protected areas and only few small-scale protected areas. Arable land predominates over forest land, especially in the central part of the uplands.
