= Milevsko =

- Town
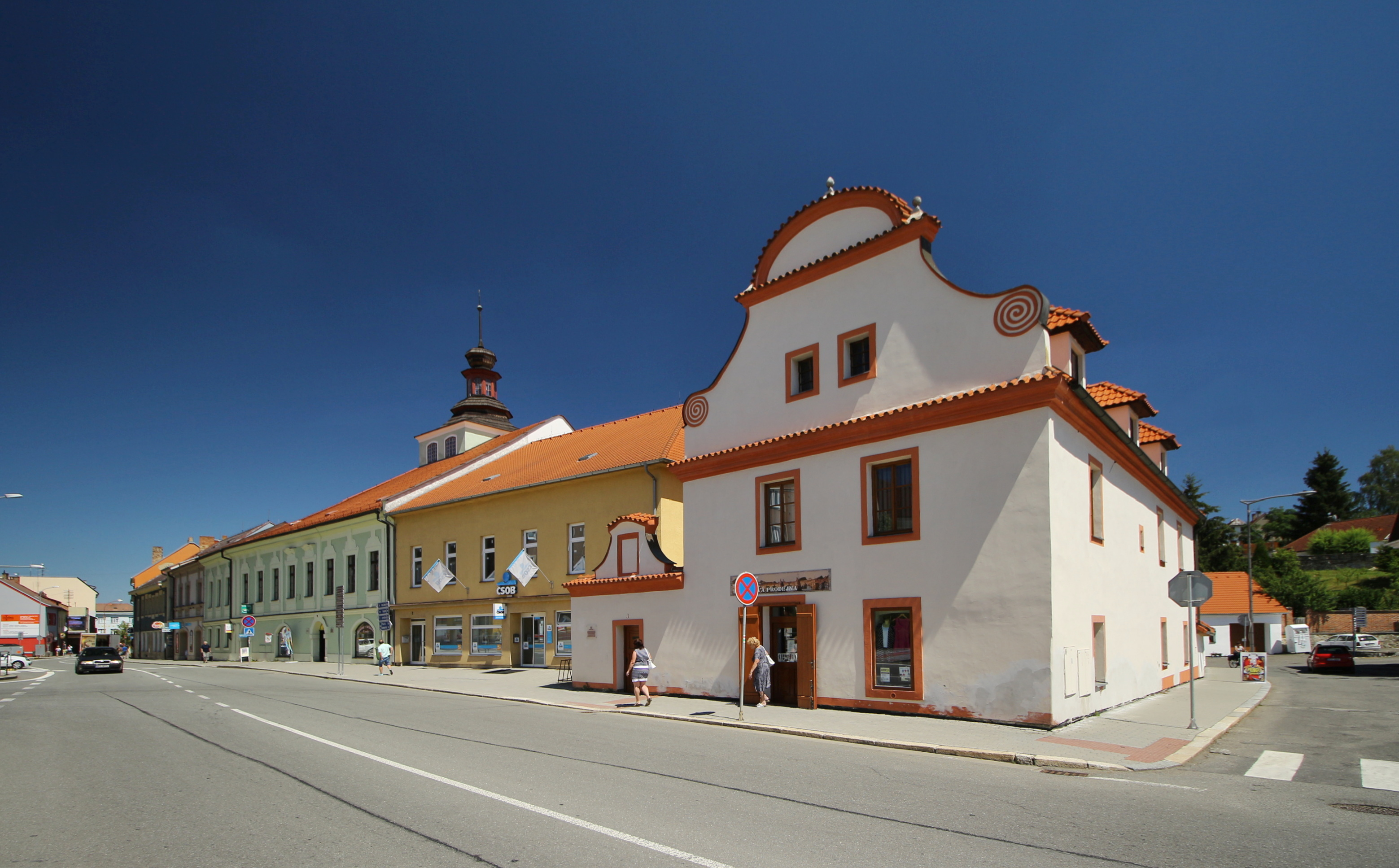
- Town square

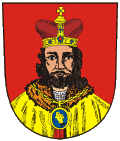
- Flag Coat of arms

- Location in the Czech Republic
- Coordinates: 49°27′3″N 14°21′36″E
- Country: Czech Republic
- Region: South Bohemian
- District: Písek
- First mentioned: 1184

Government
  - Mayor: Ivan Radosta

Area
  - Total: 42.29 km^{2} (16.33 sq mi)
- Elevation: 461 m (1,512 ft)

Population (2026-01-01)
  - Total: 7,956
  - Density: 188.1/km^{2} (487.3/sq mi)
- Time zone: UTC+1 (CET)
  - Summer (DST): UTC+2 (CEST)
- Postal code: 399 01
- Website: www.milevsko-mesto.cz

Milevsko (Czech pronunciation: [ˈmɪlɛfsko]; German: Mühlhausen) is a town in Písek District in the South Bohemian Region of the Czech Republic. It has about 8,000 inhabitants. It is located mostly in the Tábor Uplands. The most important monument in the town is the Milevsko Monastery.

== Administrative division ==
Milevsko consists of six municipal parts (in brackets population according to the 2021 census):

- Milevsko (7,632)
- Dmýštice (65)
- Klisín (20)
- Něžovice (45)
- Rukáveč (27)
- Velká (100)

Velká forms an exclave of the municipal territory.

== Etymology ==
The initial name of the settlement and the local monastery was Milevice. This name was a shortened form of Milejovice, derived from the personal name Milej. The adjective from Milevice was milevský, which gave rise to the name change to Milevsko.

== Geography ==
Milevsko is located about 21 kilometres (13 mi) northeast of Písek and 62 km (39 mi) south of Prague. Most of the municipal territory lies in the Tábor Uplands, but the northern part extends into the Vlašim Uplands and includes the highest point of Milevsko, the hill Zběžnice at 608 m (1,995 ft) above sea level. The town is surrounded by several fishponds.

== History ==
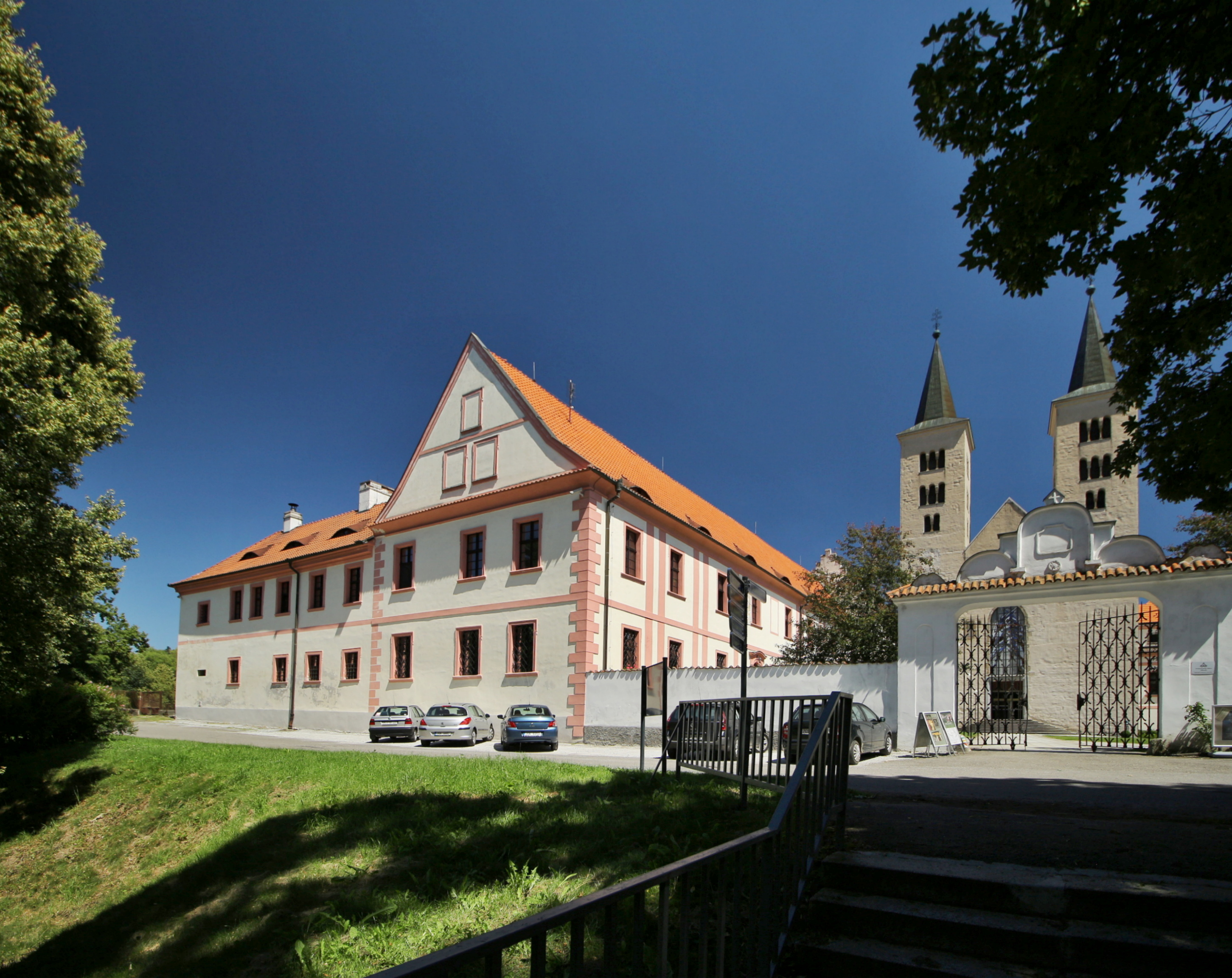
Milevsko Monastery

Archaeological excavations have shown that the people lived in the area in the Paleolithic times. Other discoveries show occupation in the Bronze Age and the Hallstatt Culture period. During the Migration Period the area was slowly settled by Slavs in the 8th century.

The first written mention of Milevsko is from 1184 and three years later a Premonstratensian monastery was built. At the end of the 12th century, Milevsko was an important intersection of two trade routes. The following years were the time of prosperity and the monastery became one of the richest monasteries in the Bohemia. In 1327, Milevsko was first referred to as a market town, and in the 15th century, it became a town. The end of prosperity was caused by an attack of the Hussites, who burned the monastery down in 1420. After 1581, during the rule of the Hodějovský of Hodějov family, the monastery was rebuilt to a manor house. In 1622 after the Battle of White Mountain, the monastery was returned to the Premonstrates of the Strahov Monastery.

In the 17th and 18th centuries, Milevsko was struck by the bubonic plague. The town with its surroundings became one of the poorest regions in the kingdom, which lasted until the beginning of the 20th century. Traditional crafts developed here, especially pottery.

Until 1918, the town was a part of Austria-Hungary, a seat of the eponymous district, which was one of 94 Bezirkshauptmannschaften of Bohemia.

== Demographics ==
Historical population

Year	Pop.	±%
1869	4,360	—
1880	4,248	−2.6%
1890	4,290	+1.0%
1900	4,102	−4.4%
1910	4,241	+3.4%

Year	Pop.	±%
1921	4,284	+1.0%
1930	4,324	+0.9%
1950	4,000	−7.5%
1961	5,989	+49.7%
1970	7,553	+26.1%

Year	Pop.	±%
1980	9,238	+22.3%
1991	9,782	+5.9%
2001	9,486	−3.0%
2011	8,661	−8.7%
2021	7,889	−8.9%

Source: Censuses

== Economy ==
In Milevsko is a large machine factory ZVVZ (Závody na výrobu vzduchotechnických zařízení – the factory for the production of HVAC equipment).

== Transport ==
The I/19 road (the section from Plzeň to Tábor) runs through the town.

Milevsko is located on the railway line Tábor–Písek.

== Sights ==
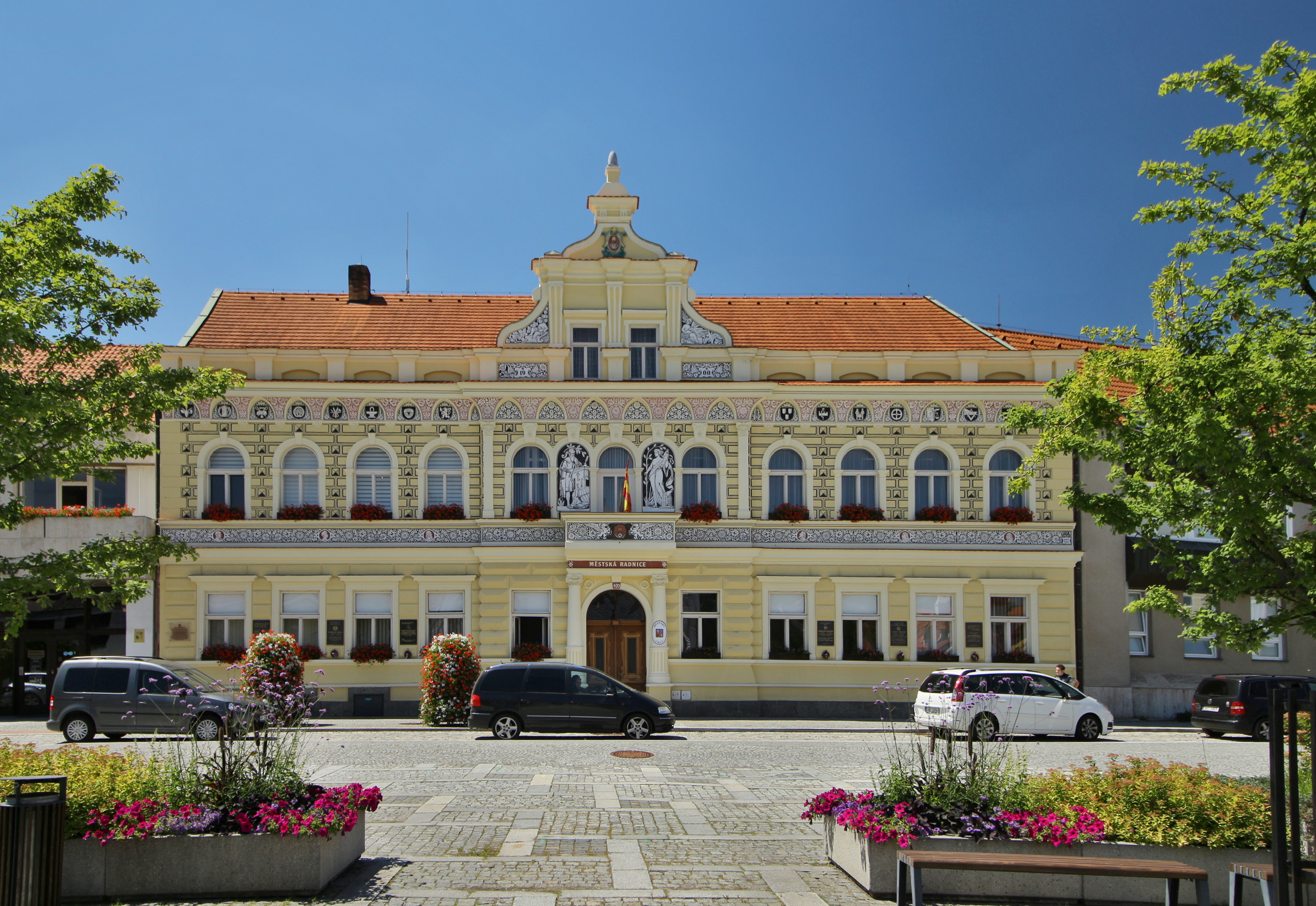
New Town Hall

The monastery complex consisting of several buildings is the main landmark. The Milevsko Monastery is the oldest in the South Bohemian Region. The Romanesque core is preserved to this day. The western part was rebuilt to the Baroque style and today it houses the regional Milevsko Museum.

The Church of Saint Giles is as old as the town. The massive bell tower and the north wall with a staircase have been preserved from the original Romanesque church. The church was rebuilt in Gothic style in the 14th century.

The historic town centre is made up of the square Náměstí Dr. E. Beneše. Its main landmarks are Old Town Hall, New Town Hall, and the Church of Saint Bartholomew. The church is a Neo-Romanesque building from 1844. The Old Town Hall was built in the Baroque style in the 17th century and today houses a library, the tourist information centre, an art gallery and a bank. The New Town Hall was built in the Neo-Renaissance style in 1901–1902 nad has a sgraffito decoration of the façade from 1936.

== Twin towns – sister cities ==
Milevsko is twinned with:

- Münchenbuchsee, Switzerland
