= Vltavou =

Vltavou refers to the river Vltava, in the Czech Republic. It may also refer to:

== Places in the Czech Republic ==
- Albrechtice nad Vltavou, a village in Písek District, South Bohemian Region
- Boršov nad Vltavou, a village in České Budějovice District, South Bohemian Region
- Hluboká nad Vltavou, a town in České Budějovice District, South Bohemian Region
- Kamýk nad Vltavou, a village in Příbram District, Central Bohemian Region
- Kostelec nad Vltavou, a village in Písek District, South Bohemian Region
- Kralupy nad Vltavou, a town in Mělník District, Central Bohemian Region
- Krásná Hora nad Vltavou, a village in Příbram District, Central Bohemian Region
- Libčice nad Vltavou, a town in Prague-West District, Central Bohemian Region
- Lipno nad Vltavou, a village in Český Krumlov District, South Bohemian Region
- Lužec nad Vltavou, a village in Mělník District, Central Bohemian Region
- Orlík nad Vltavou, a village in Písek District, South Bohemian Region
- Rožmberk nad Vltavou, a village in Český Krumlov District, South Bohemian Region
- Týn nad Vltavou, a town in České Budějovice District, South Bohemian Region
- Vrané nad Vltavou, a village in Prague-West District, Central Bohemian Region

== Asteroids ==
- 14537 Týn nad Vltavou, named after Týn nad Vltavou
- 15960 Hluboká, named after Hluboká nad Vltavou

== Football clubs ==
- TJ Hluboká nad Vltavou, based in Hluboká nad Vltavou
- FK Olympie Týn nad Vltavou, based in Týn nad Vltavou

== Bridges ==
- Viaduct Červená nad Vltavou, the highest rail viaduct in the Czech Republic
