= Kölleda =

- Town
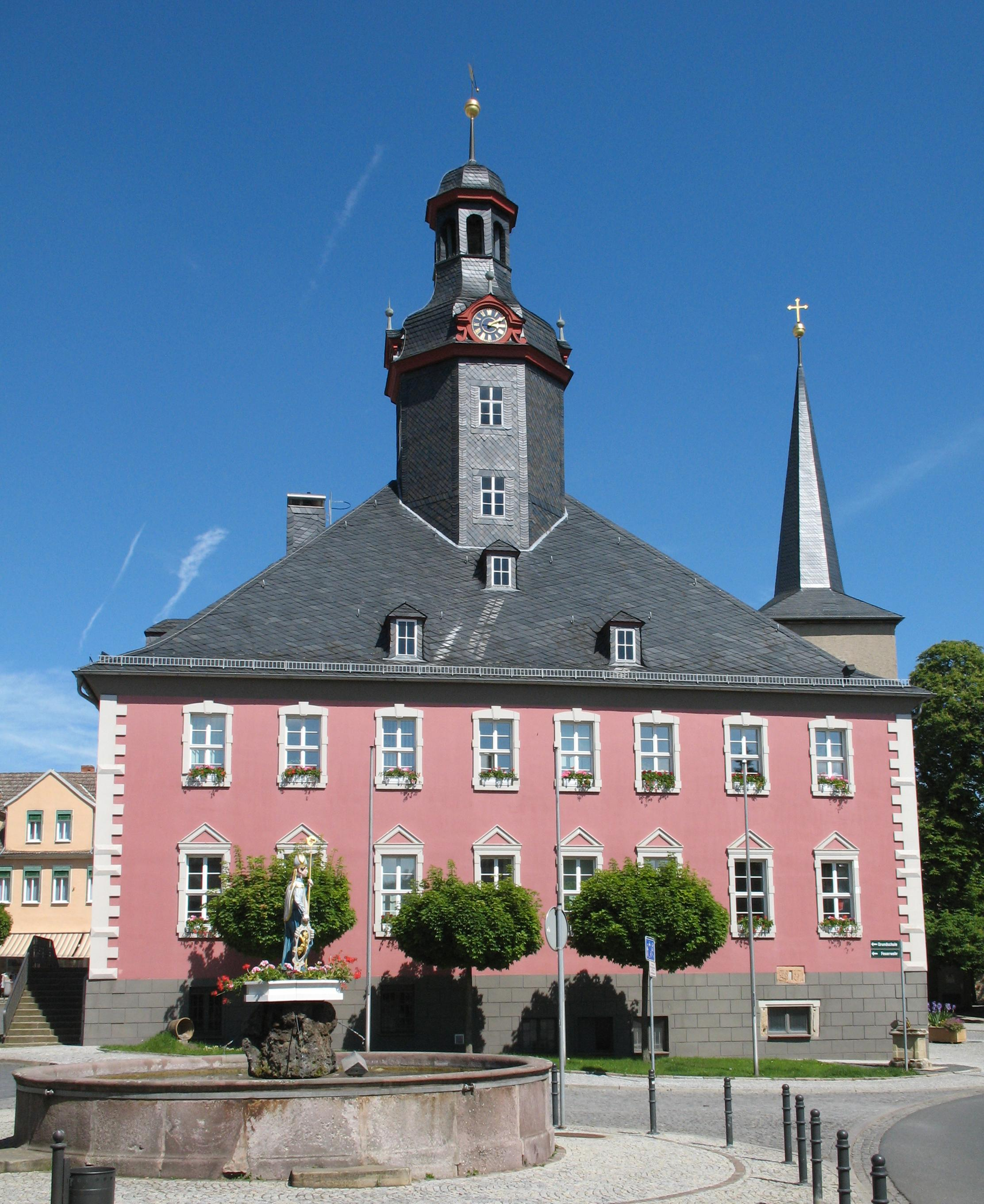
- Town hall built in 1702

- Coat of arms

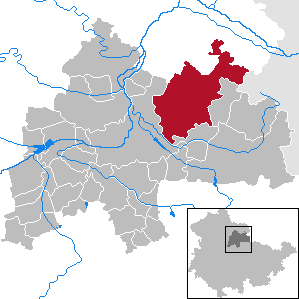
- Location of Kölleda within Sömmerda district
- Interactive map of Kölleda
- Location within Germany Location within Thuringia
- Coordinates: 51°10′N 11°13′E
- Country: Germany
- State: Thuringia
- District: Sömmerda

Government
  - Mayor (2024–30): Uwe Kraneis

Area
  - Total: 89.52 km^{2} (34.56 sq mi)
- Elevation: 145 m (476 ft)

Population (2025-12-31)
  - Total: 6,467
  - Density: 72.24/km^{2} (187.1/sq mi)
- Time zone: UTC+01:00 (CET)
  - Summer (DST): UTC+02:00 (CEST)
- Postal codes: 99623, 99625
- Dialling codes: 03634, 03635
- Vehicle registration: SÖM
- Website: www.koelleda.de

Kölleda (German pronunciation: [ˈkœləda]; until 1927 Cölleda) is a small rural town in Thuringia. The municipality belongs to the district of Sömmerda and is located about ten kilometres east of the district town of Sömmerda on the edge of the Thuringian Basin. It is the third largest municipality in the district with about 6300 inhabitants. Kölleda is the seat of the Kölleda administrative community, although it does not belong to it. The inhabitants are called "Kölledaer".

Kölleda is a sub-centre for the region. The town is characterised by a former traditionally large cultivation of medicinal and aromatic herbs, especially peppermint. This led to the nickname "peppermint town" and "peppermint railway" for the Straußfurt-Großheringen railway line that runs past.

Kölleda has an eventful 1200-year old history. Significant for the town's development during the National Socialist era were the construction of an air base (now Sömmerda-Dermsdorf Airport, EDBS) and an aircraft office for the Luftwaffe and later, during the GDR era, the VEB Funkwerk Kölleda (today Funkwerk AG). After the Second World War, this was founded as a "Neutrowerk" by committed returned and immigrant experts - after the most difficult negotiations with the Soviet military administration - in the "old building" of the air base, which was therefore not blown up. There are many small and medium-sized companies in Kölleda. Above all, electrical engineering and metal processing have become increasingly important as economic factors for the town.

The "Jahnstadt" Kölleda is also known as the place of exile for the "gymnastics father" Friedrich Ludwig Jahn (memorial plaque east of the Roßplatz intersection; around 1960 also with "Jahnsportspiele" and today again with the Jahnplatz). It is also the birthplace of the chemist Fritz Hofmann, inventor of artificial methyl rubber (Buna rubber). The house where he was born (memorial plaque) is situated in the former Auenstraße, which was renamed after him.

== History ==
=== First mention and origin of name ===
Kölleda was first mentioned in a document as the village Collide in 786 in the property register of the Hersfeld Abby, the Breviarium Sancti Lulli. The ending of the place name is a connection between the Old High German -idi and the Old Saxon -ithi. The interpretation of the place name is difficult. The generally accepted opinion is that Collide means something like "in swampy terrain". This interpretation of the name is probably correct due to the location of the village in the geological region of the Thuringian Basin. The root word can hardly be traced back to the Latin word Caulis for cabbage, as was previously assumed, since the vowel in the place name Collide before the double l was probably short. Short vowels, on the other hand, are found in the Old and Middle High German words kolo and kol for coal/charcoal and Alemannic cholle(n) for glow/glow. Other opinions therefore assume that Collide meant a place where charcoal was produced, i.e. a charcoal pile. Since Kölleda was not in a forest area, there are other interpretations in research, e.g. a place of cultivation for pepper cabbage (Kölle), i.e. peppermint, which is still cultivated here today.

Over the centuries, the place name changed to "Cölleda", which is still in use today. Since 1927 the town name has been officially spelt with a "K", i.e. "Kölleda" instead of "Cölleda".

The vernacular also uses the nickname "Kuhkölln". This place name appears in an old record in 1487, which according to a legend written down by the chronicler Friedrich Heinrich Grüning in 1833 is said to have the following origin:

A distinguished gentleman once wanted to travel through the city, and when he came through the gate, he met a very large number of cattle, which were driven to the beautiful pastures belonging to the city. As he had to wait for some time in front of the gate to let the cattle coming towards him in a long line pass, he asked what the place was called. He was told it was called Cölln. Well,' says the foreign gentleman, 'it might be called Kuhcölln, in contrast to other towns, because the inhabitants can keep such a large herd of cattle.'

Another credible interpretation is that it is derived from the bonnets of the nuns of the local convent, the Kukelen. Even today, the population still uses the nickname, especially during the annual carnival procession with "Kuhkölln - Helau".

==== Historical spellings of the name Kölleda ====
Spelling	Mention in documents
Collide	in the year 786
Collithi	in the years 1005-1012
Colleda	in the year 1044
Kulide	in the year 1195
Kolleda	in the year 1224
Culleda	in the year 1229
Kuhkollen	in the year 1478
Colleda	end of the 15th century
Colde	in the year 1519
Cöln an der Lossa	in the 16th century
Cölleda	until 1927
Kölleda	as of 1927

=== Middle Ages ===
The feudal lord of the town was the Hersfeld Abbey, which enfeoffed the Counts of Beichlingen with income from the town. When the Peter-Paul-Church in the village slowly became too small for the growing population, the St. Johannes Monastery Church was built in its place in 1266. The church was part of the Convent, founded on 8 September at the instigation of Abbot Lullus of Hersfeld Monastery, by the convent of nuns of the grey St. Benedict Order. In 1303, numerous Jews were murdered in Cölleda and the surrounding area because of their religion. At the intersection of two trade routes, Cölleda developed as a market and trading centre to become the most important town in the surrounding area, which led to Friedrich VI Count of Beichlingen Cölleda was granted town charter in 1392. Despite the town charter, however, the supreme feudal sovereignty remained with Hersfeld Monastery. At the beginning of the 16th century, the Lords of Werthern took the place of the Counts of Beichlingen. Their family coat of arms was incorporated into the town coat of arms of Cölleda.

=== Modern times and industrialisation ===
A plague-like epidemic killed 500 people in Cölleda in 1518. In 1519, the counts of Werthern received the county of Beichlingen and the rights for the municipality of Cölleda. With the upswing of agriculture and cattle breeding in the area, a distinct market system developed, which led to the construction of a market well in 1528. After the Schmalkaldic War, Cölleda belonged to the Electorate of Saxony. In 1553, the Backleber Tor (Backleber Gate) was built and three years later the bridge gate. With the dissolution of the Hersfeld monastery, the town acquired the associated lands. In 1577 and 1578, 448 people fell victim to the plague. During the Thirty Years' War (1618-1648), military activity, looting and epidemics occurred repeatedly in the town. During the plague in 1626, 1000 people died in Kölleda. In 1634, troops from the Electorate of Saxony were quartered in Cölleda for 22 weeks. Cölleda had to pay a monthly tribute of 800 Thaler. To commemorate the peace after the war, a memorial stone was erected on 19 April 1649 along the boundary between Cölleda and Großneuhausen.

In addition to the two existing town halls, the third town hall was built in 1702. In 1724 the Electoral Saxon Post Office was built and in 1744 the new school at the market. Prussia received some Albertine lands after the Congress of Vienna in 1815, including Cölleda. With the transfer of the district administration from Wiehe to Cölleda in 1824, Cölleda was elevated by royal cabinet order to the status of district town of the newly established District of Eckartsberga in the Merseburg administrative district of the Province of Saxony. The year 1824 also marked the beginning of the cultivation of medicinal herbs, especially peppermint, which gave Cölleda the nickname Peppermint Town in 1830. In 1848, during the March Revolution, civil defence units stood up to the Prussian military and forced the soldiers to withdraw from the town. On 22 September of that year, a popular assembly took place in Cölleda, in which 15,000 people from Cölleda, Sömmerda and the surrounding villages are said to have participated. This assembly was an expression of a popular movement that had forced the expropriation of the large estates in two neighbouring communities of Sömmerda and their division among the peasants and day labourers. However, the movement was put down and one of its leaders and 70 other people from the region were sentenced to 25 years in prison each. In 1857, the district savings bank was established. The Saal-Unstrut-Eisenbahn-Gesellschaft (SUE), founded in Cölleda in 1870, opened the Straußfurt-Großheringen railway line in 1874. (peppermint railway); with it, Cölleda also received a telegraph station. Seven years after the railway line was put into operation, the stagecoach service was discontinued in 1881. In 1884, the district administration office was built. The well was connected to the newly built water supply from the Backleber spring in 1890.

At the turn of the century in 1900, a gasworks was built in Cölleda, the new school in Hundtgasse street was handed over and the first telephone connection went into operation. In 1908, a hospital was built. The children's home, which had been built with funds from the Karl and Fritz Feistkorn Foundation, was handed over in 1911. On 12 March 1912, the construction contracts for the Laucha-Kölleda railway line (Finnebahn) were awarded. In 1913, the public baths were handed over by the Feistkorn Foundation.

On 1 May 1914, the Cölleda-Lossa section of the Finnebahn was opened. The construction of the Finnebahn made Cölleda a railway junction. At the end of the First World War (1914-1918), Cölleda counted more than 100 casualties.

The electrification Due to the morphological more appropriate initial sound, the spelling was changed to Kölleda in 1927.

=== From National Socialism to the founding of the GDR ===
On 1 January 1934, the Prussian Municipal Constitution Act of 15 December 1933 was introduced, and the municipality of Kölleda was renamed the town of Kölleda. During the National Socialist era, Kölleda experienced strong population growth, justified by the rearmament policy of the 1930s. In 1935, an air base and an aviation office were established in Kölleda, which represented a turning point in the town's development, because within a few years the number of inhabitants had almost doubled in connection with the air base and the necessary aviation personnel. In 1936, the Schillingstedter district and the Bahner district were built, the barracks on Kiebitzhöhe were erected and Kiebitzhöhe was given a railway stop. At the same time, the airfield was developed into one of the largest air force bases in Germany. On 1 November 1941, Auenstraße was renamed Prof.-Hofmann street on the occasion of the 75th birthday of Fritz Hofmann.

Shortly after the seizure of power by the National Socialists, severe persecution of Jews, Social Democrats, Communists and members of the bekennende Kirche began, and several citizens of Kölleda were deported to concentration camps. Another citizen was sentenced in 1943 for "insidious statement to prison imprisonment, which he served in the Erfurt penitentiary. A woman protected until then by her non-Jewish husband was deported to the Theresienstadt concentration camp in 1944, where she died two days after her arrival. During the Second World War, a large number of prisoners of wars, as well as women and men from Belgium, France, the Netherlandss and the Soviet Union forced labour: at the air base and at the Angora farm. On the instructions of the SED regional leadership, the war memorial on the Rossplatz was converted into a memorial for the victims of fascism in 1946/47.

Despite an air raid in 1944 on the airfield in Kölleda, the city centre was spared during the Second World War and was handed over to the US without a fight on 11 April 1945. On 1 July, the American occupation was replaced by the Soviet occupation.

Immediately after the takeover, the Soviet Army set up a prison in the villa on the corner of Bahnhofstraße and Hopfendamm. The prison was run by the Soviet secret service. There were many reasons for imprisonment, such as mistreatment of Eastern workers, activity in National Socialist organisations, possession of weapons and activity as a Werwolf. Some of the prisoners were also mistreated during interrogations and some were subsequently sentenced to 10 or 25 years' penal servitude by the military tribunal in Naumburg Prison. There were also sentences to death, the executions taking place in the Red Ox in Halle. The other convicts were sent via Halle to the Special Camp Torgau (Fort Zinna) or to Bautzen Prison. At the end of 1947, the prisoners were transferred to the Soviet Special Camp Sachsenhausen. A prime example is the story of the Greußen Boys.

At the beginning of 1948, the Finnebahn was shut down in favour of reparations for the Soviet Union.

=== GDR period ===
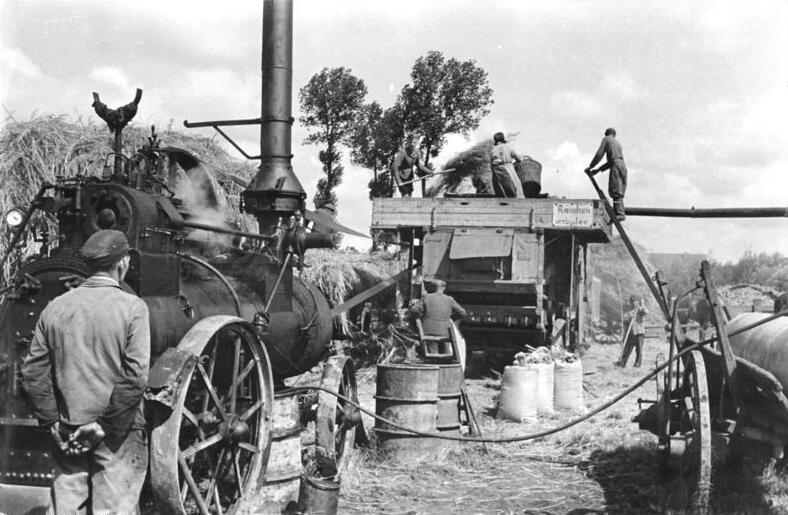
Cereal residues in Dermsdorf 1953

On 7 October 1949 Kölleda became part of the newly founded German Democratic Republic. In 1950, the government of Saxony-Anhalt decided to rename the district of Eckartsberga to the district of Kölleda. Battgendorf was incorporated on 1 July 1950. Due to the territorial reform in 1952, Kölleda lost its district town status and has since belonged to the district of Sömmerda (until 1990 Erfurt district, since then Thuringia). In 1957, the municipal swimming pool Streitsee was handed over. Kiebitzhöhe was built as a new district in the east of the town in 1958. A bus station was built at Rossplatz in 1968. In 1978, the municipal association was founded. The 1200-year celebration took place in 1986. In 1990 Kölleda was a venue for matches in the European Under-16 Football Championship 1990.

=== Post-reunification period until today ===
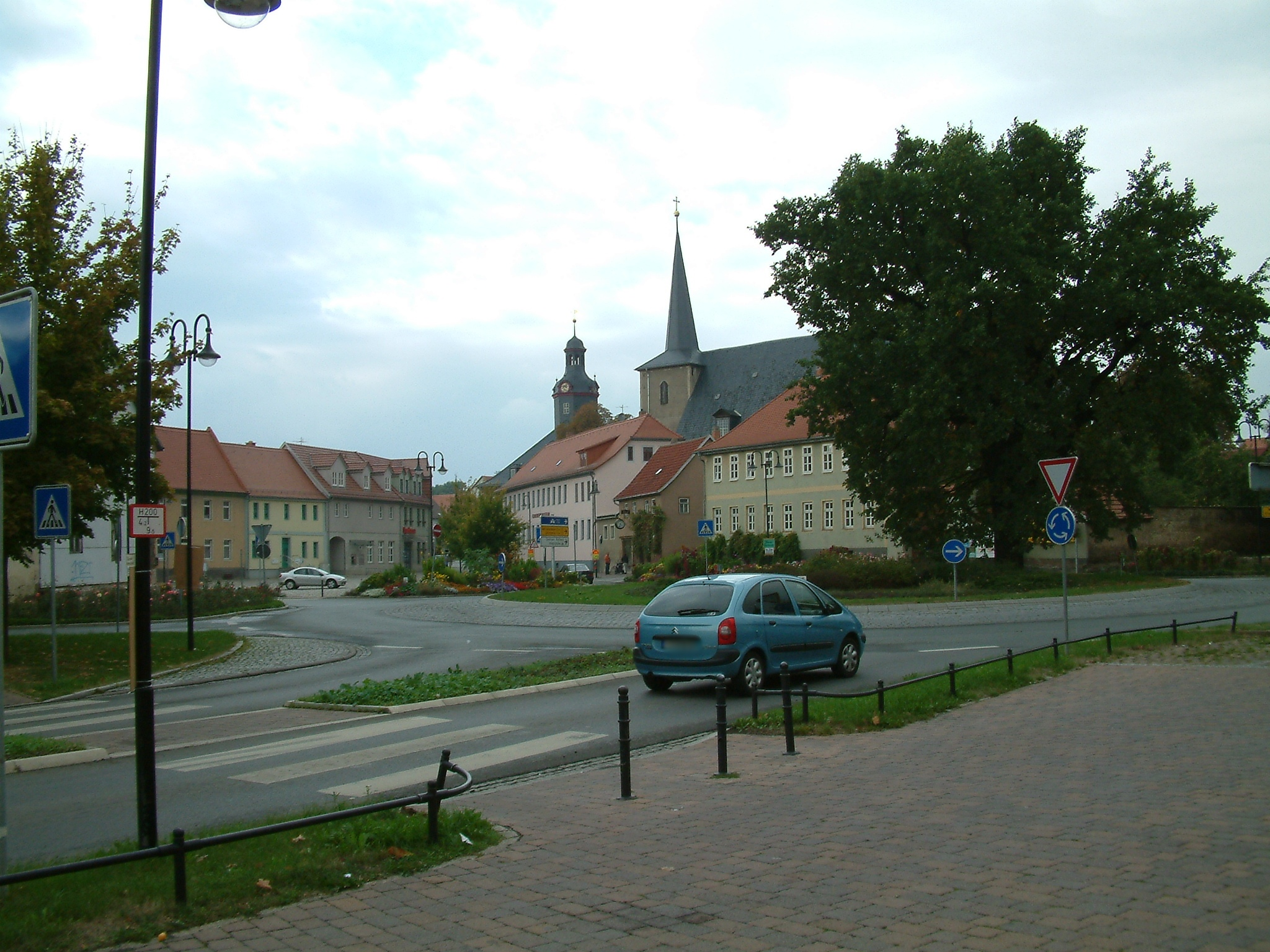
The Rossplatz

In 1992, the Feistkornstraße residential area with 212 flats was handed over. In the same year, the citizens of Kölleda and their guests celebrated the 600th anniversary of the granting of the town and market rights by Count Friedrich VI of Beichlingen. One year later, the town library and the town archive were inaugurated in the former Wannebad. The Kölleda administrative community was founded in 1994. The administrative community now included the municipalities of Beichlingen, Großmonra, Großneuhausen, Kleinneuhausen, Ostramondra and Schillingstedt. In the same year, the local history museum on Rossplatz was reopened after reconstruction. Dermsdorf was incorporated on 22 January by the Thuringian Reorganisation Act of 27 August 1993. In 1997, the topping-out ceremony was held for the school extension at the Prof. Hofmann School. The herb mill was inaugurated in 1998. In a record attempt in 1999, Kölleda was able to enter the Guinness Book of Records with the largest tea bag in the world.

In 1999, the town sought to terminate its membership in the Kölleda administrative community, which had existed since 1994, because it felt that this violated its right to local self-government. Since this was not possible according to §§ 25 and 48 sentence 1 of the Thuringian Law on the Reorganisation of Municipalities, it filed a constitutional complaint with the Thuringian Constitutional Court. However, the Constitutional Court rejected the constitutional complaint in a ruling of 30 July 1999.

At the turn of the millennium in 2000, the Kölleda Funkwerk museum was handed over. In 2001, the exhibition Against Forgetting - Central Germany's Air War History was opened in the Backleber Tor.

When a location was sought for the MDC Power GmbH engine plant, Kölleda was chosen from 49 possible sites. As a result, major investments were made in the infrastructure of the industrial estate. The industrial track to the Kiebitzhöhe industrial estate was laid anew and a roundabout was created between Frohndorf and Kölleda to direct heavy goods traffic from the Bundesstraße 176 via the new cross road to the industrial estate. In 2002, construction of the engine plant began and the topping-out ceremony was held on 2 August. On 11 December of that year, a new substation for the industrial estate was commissioned, and five days later, on 16 December, the new connection from the roundabout to the Gewerbegebiet Kiebitzhöhe and the section of the Federal Motorway 71 from Sömmerda to Erfurt were inaugurated. Construction was completed in December 2003 and production started on 4 December. In 2006, after more than a year of consideration, the Thuringian Ministry of the Interior made the decision to admit the town of Rastenberg to the Kölleda administrative community. With effect from 1 January 2007, the town of Rastenberg joined the Kölleda administrative community. On 31 December 2012, the municipality of Großmonra with its districts Backleben and Burgwenden was incorporated into Kölleda. On 1 January 2019, the municipality of Beichlingen with its local parts Beichlingen and Altenbeichlingen was incorporated.

On 1 January 2021, Kölleda left the Kölleda administrative community.

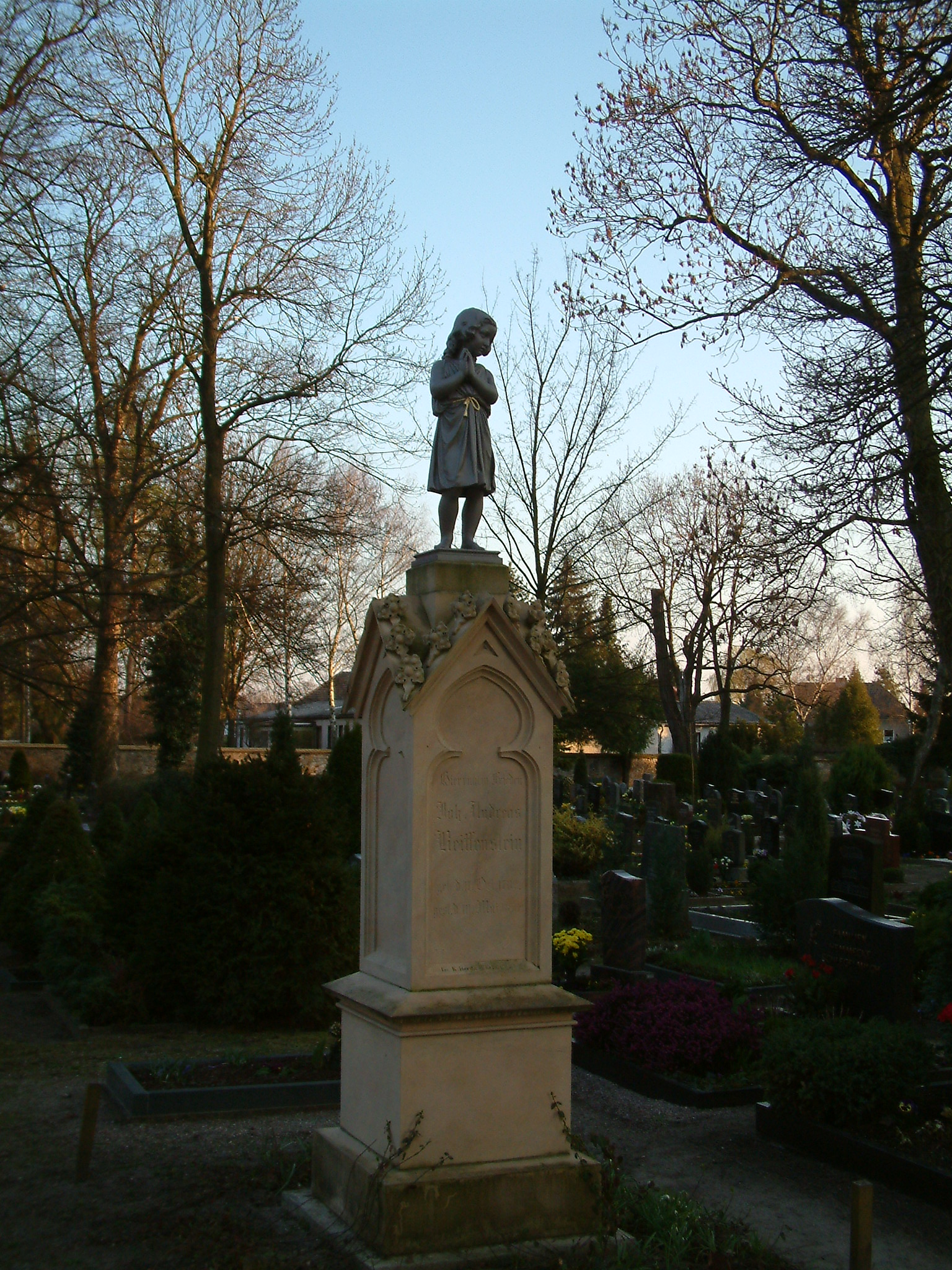
cemetery Kölleda

=== Religions ===
Protestants predominate among the town's religious residents. The Protestant regional parish of Kölleda is served jointly by the pastor couple Gerlinde and Joachim Justus Breithaupt. They are responsible for the villages of Kölleda, Ostramondra, Großmonra, Backleben, Burgwenden, Battgendorf, Backleben, Dermsdorf, Bachra/Schafau and Ostramondra. Christian teaching and confirmation classes are held regularly. In Kölleda, a community centre was ceremoniously opened in 2014. The gospel choir "Coloured Unit" rehearses here.

=== Population development ===
The following data shows the development of the population of the town of Kölleda. In summary, it can be seen that the development of the population rose sharply at the time of National Socialism and the GDR. This is due on the one hand to the former air base and the aviation office and on the other hand to the radio factory, both of which were major employers in the town. As a result of the 30-year war, there has been a sharp decline in the population. After the Wende (GDR), there was a steady decline in the number of inhabitants until the incorporation of Großmonra in 2012.

==== Development of the number of inhabitants before 1990 ====
year	Inhabitant
1580	1500
1640	900
1795	1520
1800	1700
1819	1845
1835	2575
1837	2000
1857	3350
1864	3511
1875	3363

year	inhabitant
1880	3609
1885	3595
1890	3446
1895	3549
1900	3430
1905	3397
1910	3473
1925	3475
1929	3506

year	inhabitant
1933	3655
1938	5400
1939	6135
1945	7357
1950	7300
1961	7400
1962	7300
1978	7800
1989	6508

==== Development of the number of inhabitants as of 1990 ====
year	Inhabitants
1990	6400
1994	6432
1995	6424
1996	6398
1997	6297
1998	6256
1999	6207
2000	6123
2001	6052

year	inhabitant
2002	5983
2003	5904
2004	5867
2005	5767
2006	5687
2007	5589
2008	5508
2009	5526
2010	5498

year	inhabitant
2011	5294
2012	6116
2013	6112
2014	6060
2015	6181
2016	6042
2017	5957
2018	5901
2019	6348

== Politics ==
=== Mayors ===
Since the granting of the town charter in 1392, the most important right of the citizens of Kölleda was to elect a twelve-member council, headed by the "Ratsmeister", who soon had the title of "Burgemeister". In the 16th and 17th centuries, the town's leadership consisted of "three means", a ruling and two dormant mayors, of whom only one was ever in charge. Until 1832, the mayors were part-time.It was not until the introduction of the revised Prussian Town Code of 1831 that the mayoralty in Kölleda was held on a full-time basis.

Udo Hoffmann (Freie Wähler), who was elected in the mayoral election on 6 May 2012, had been the full-time mayor of Kölleda since 1 July 2012. For reasons of age, he was not allowed to run again in the municipal elections on 15 April 2018. In a run-off election on 29 April 2018, Lutz Riedel (SPD) prevailed against Patric Nowak, who has held the mayoralty since 1 July 2018.

Previous mayors of the city of Kölleda

Time period	Name	Party
since 2018	Lutz Riedel	SPD
2012–2018	Udo Hoffmann	Freie Wähler
1992–2012	Frank Zweimann	CDU
1990–1992	Bernd Prellberg	FDP
1983–1990	Helmut Zirnik	SED/PDS/non-party
1982–1983	Heinz Wurzler	SED
1980–1982	Manfred Hölzer	SED
1973–1980	Kurt Hoffmann	SED
1955–1973	Hans Helm	SED
1952–1954	Josef Ommer	
1951–1952	Ida Ragnitz	
1949–1950	Kurt Kortsch	
1947–1948	Kurt Koch	
1946–1947	Kurt Kortsch	
1945.7.1–1946	Otto Paehlke	
1945.3.28–?	Carl Steinicke	NSDAP
1933–1945.3.27	Pinger	NSDAP
1909–1933	Otto Graupner	
1888–1909	Tänzel	
1849–1876	Albert Gottlöber	
1843–1849	Albrecht	
1832–1843	Karl Wilhelm Kirchheim	
1825–1832 (?)	Christian Hermann Haubold	
1816–1825	Christoph Günther Graf	
1798–1816	Christian Lehmann	
?–1798	Johann Heinrich Döring	
?	Simon Wettig	

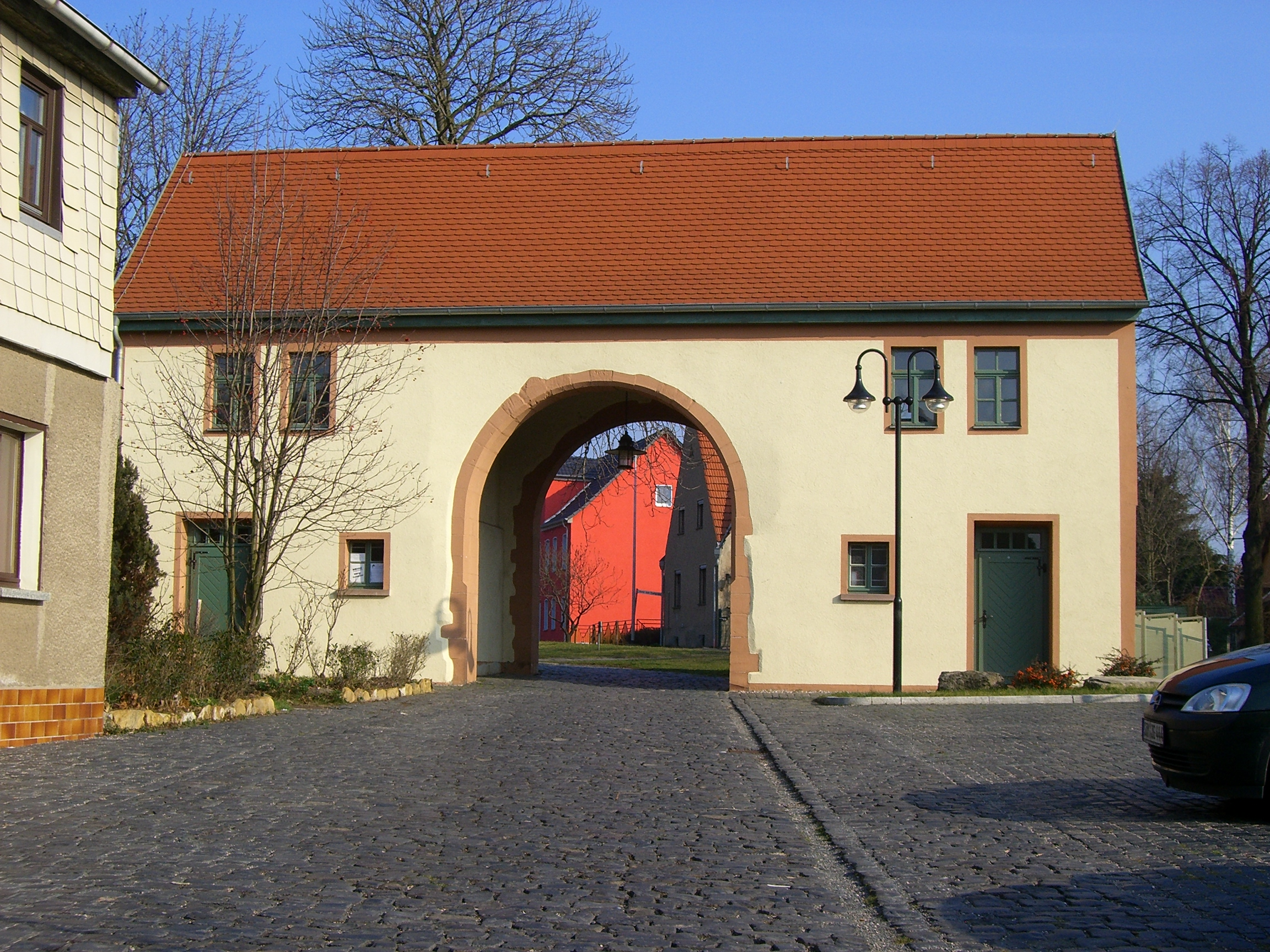
The Backleber gate

=== Coat of arms ===
The coat of arms of Kölleda depicts St Wippertus, patron saint of the town. St. Wippertus is on a silver background, facing right, holding grapes in his right hand and a golden staff in his left hand. Below St. Wippertus is a shield representing a golden branch of an oak tree with three leaves on a black background.

Meaning: St. Wippertus was a Benedictine monk from the Anglo-Saxon monastery of Glastonbury and a disciple of Boniface. Around 730 he came to the Hessian-Thuringian mission area. The grapes in the hand of St. Wippertus are connected with a miracle story. According to it, one day the necessary Mass wine was missing. But St. Wippertus brought a freshly picked grape, pressed its juice with his hands into the communion chalice and had fermented wine in it. The coat of arms with the oak leaves is the coat of arms of the Counts of Werthern, who gained the rights to the town in 1519.

=== Town friendship ===
- Hochheim am Main in Hesse

== Literature ==
- Friedrich Heinrich Grüning: Neue vervollständigte Chronik der Stadt Cölleda. s. n., s. l. 1835, (Digitalisat).
- Reinhard Clemen: Die Finanzwirtschaft der kleineren preussischen Städte und ihre Entwicklung seit 1871. Vornehmlich dargestellt an Städten Torgau und Cölleda i. Thüringen. s. n., Halle (Saale) 1911, (Halle, university, Dissertation, 1911; Digitalisat).
- Karl Michael: Geschichte der Stadt Kölleda im Mittelalter und zur Zeit der Reformation. Band 4. s. n., Kölleda 1974, (typewritten duplicate).
- Kölleda. Eine Verwaltungsgemeinschaft stellt sich vor … Kölleda, Beichlingen, Großneuhausen, Großmonra, Kleinneuhausen, Schillingstedt, Ostramondra. Besuchen Sie uns! 3rd edition. WEKA-Info-Verlag, Mering 2005.
- 1225 Jahre Kölleda. 786–2011. Festschrift 786–2011. Municipality of Kölleda, Kölleda 2011.

== Personalities ==
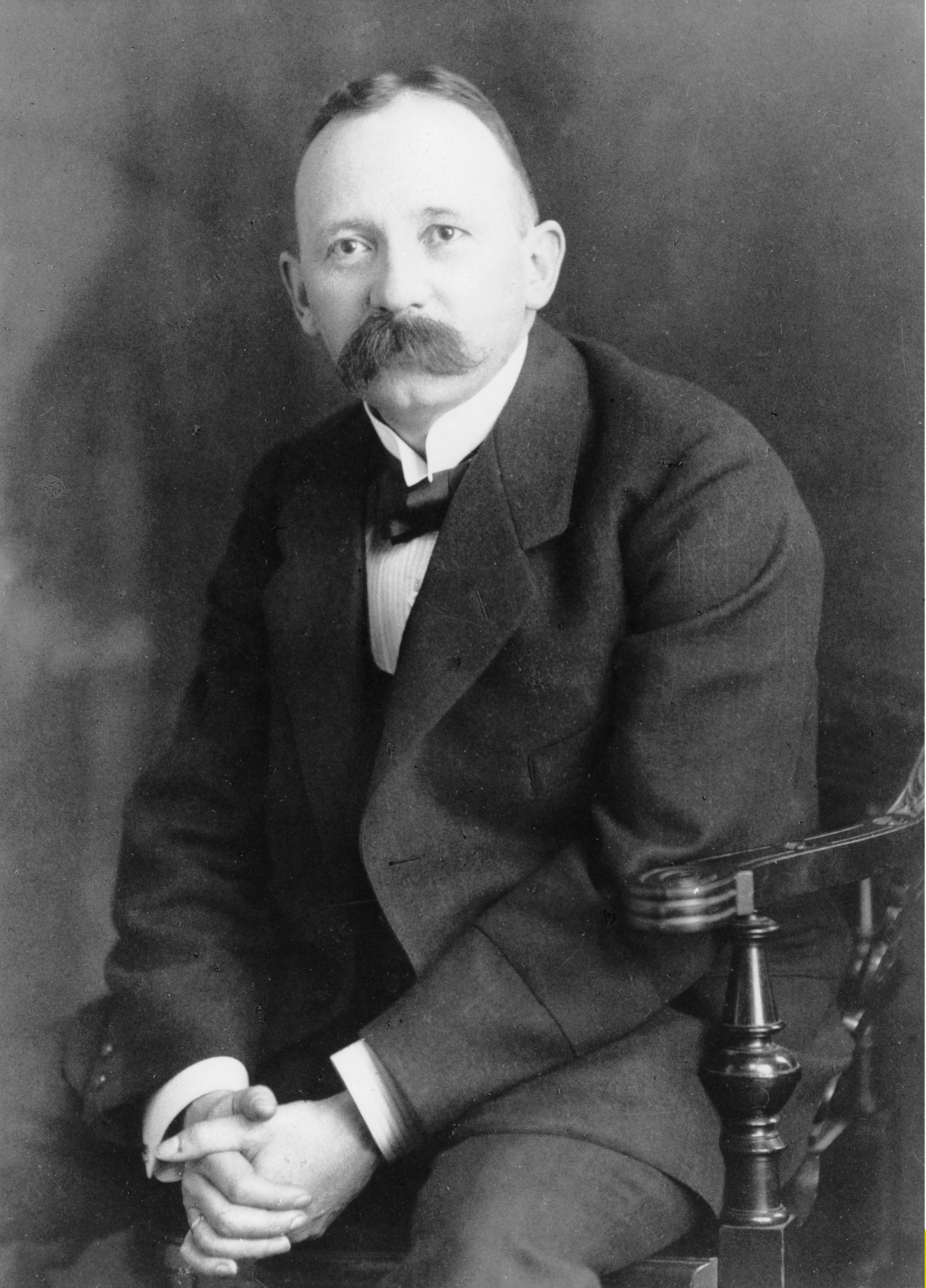
Fritz Hofmann

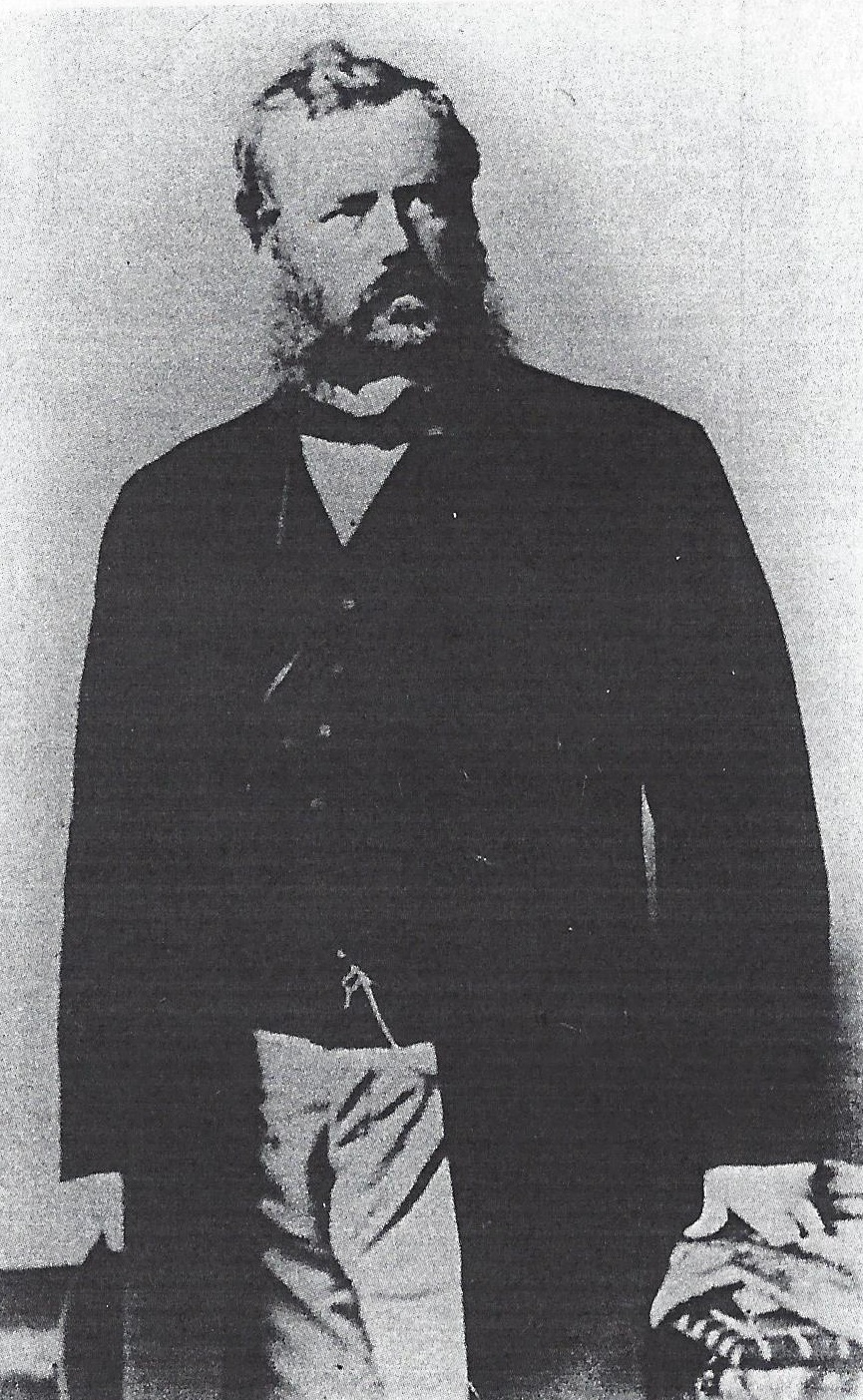
Lothar von Wurmb

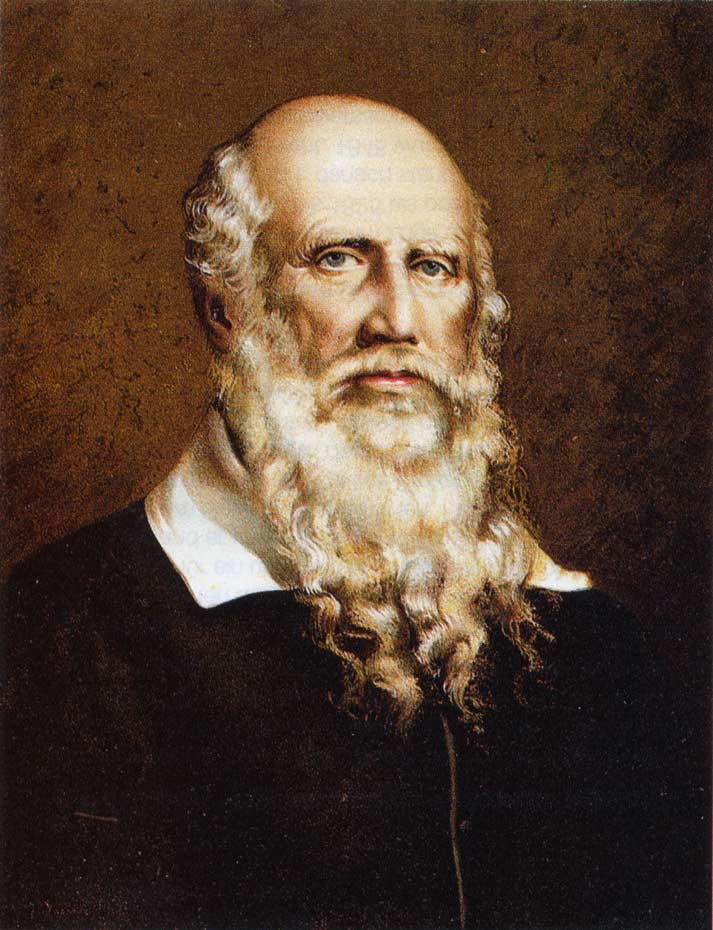
Friedrich Ludwig Jahn

=== Honorary citizen ===
- Otto von Bismarck (* 1 April 1815 in Schönhausen; † 30 July 1898 in Friedrichsruh), first Chancellor of the German Empire
- Karl Feistkorn (* 20 January 1850; † 18 November 1923 in Kölleda), textile manufacturer in Gera and founder of the children's home
- Fritz Feistkorn (* 26 February 1859; † 23 April 1929 in Kölleda), textile manufacturer in Gera and benefactor of the children's home
- Fritz Hofmann (* 2 November 1866; † 29 October 1956 in Hanover), chemist and inventor of synthetic rubber.

=== Sons and daughters of the city ===
- Christoph von Hellwig (* 15 July 1663; † 27 May 1721 in Erfurt), physician and creator of the 100-year calendar
- Wilhelm Friedrich Riem (* 17 December 1779; † 20 April 1857 in Bremen), composer and conductor
- Richard Groschopp (* 19 February 1906; † 8 July 1996 in Kleinmachnow near Berlin), director and cinematographer

=== Personalities associated with the town ===
- Louise Brachmann (1777-1822), writer, lived briefly in Kölleda
- Friedrich Ludwig Jahn (1778-1852), also called "Turnvater Jahn", lived in Kölleda from 1828 to 1835
- Albert Traeger (1830-1912), politician and poet, worked as a lawyer and notary in Kölleda from 1862 to 1875
- Hugo Launicke (1909-1975), resistance fighter against National Socialism and later SED politician, was district councillor in Kölleda district
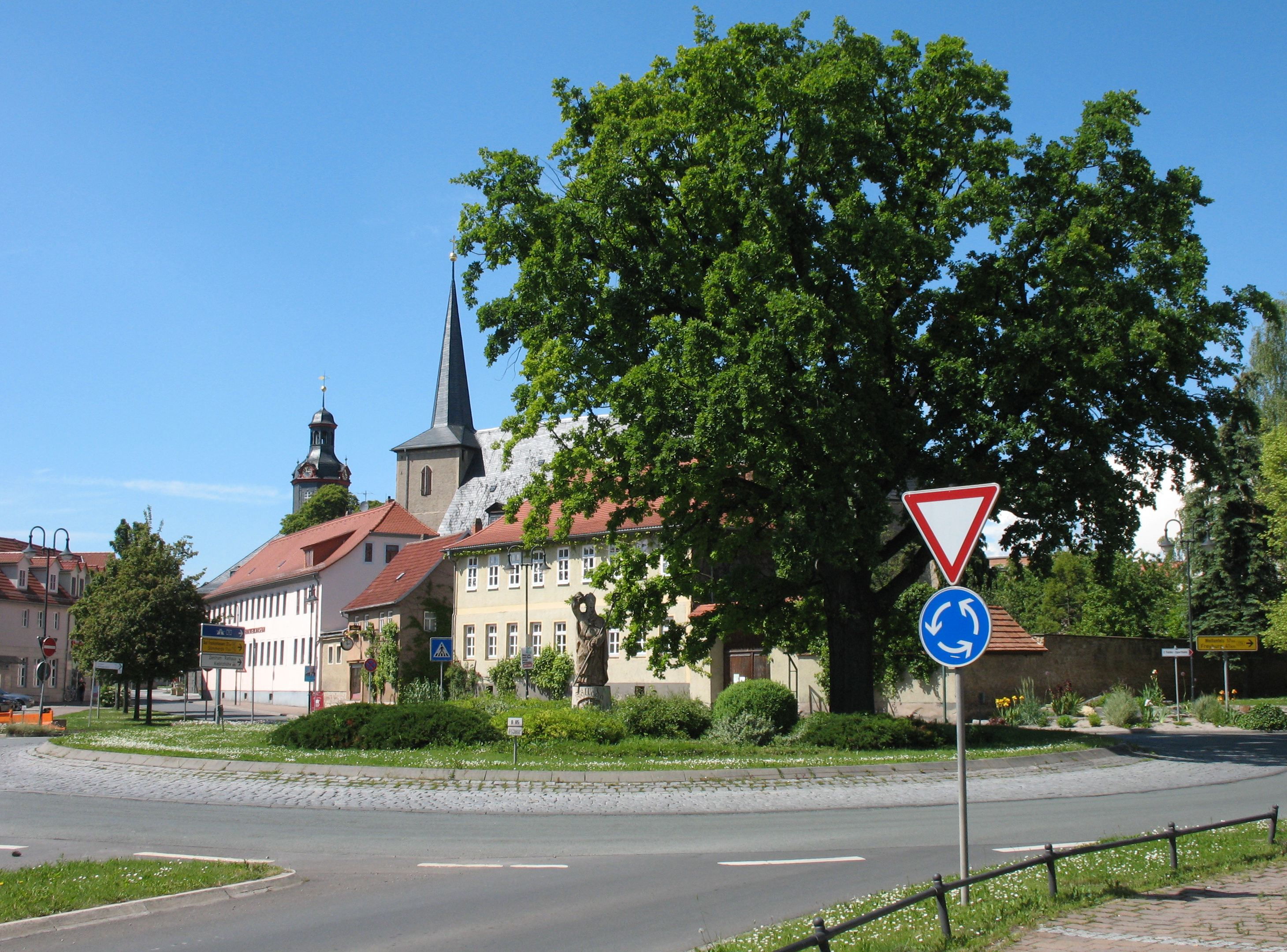

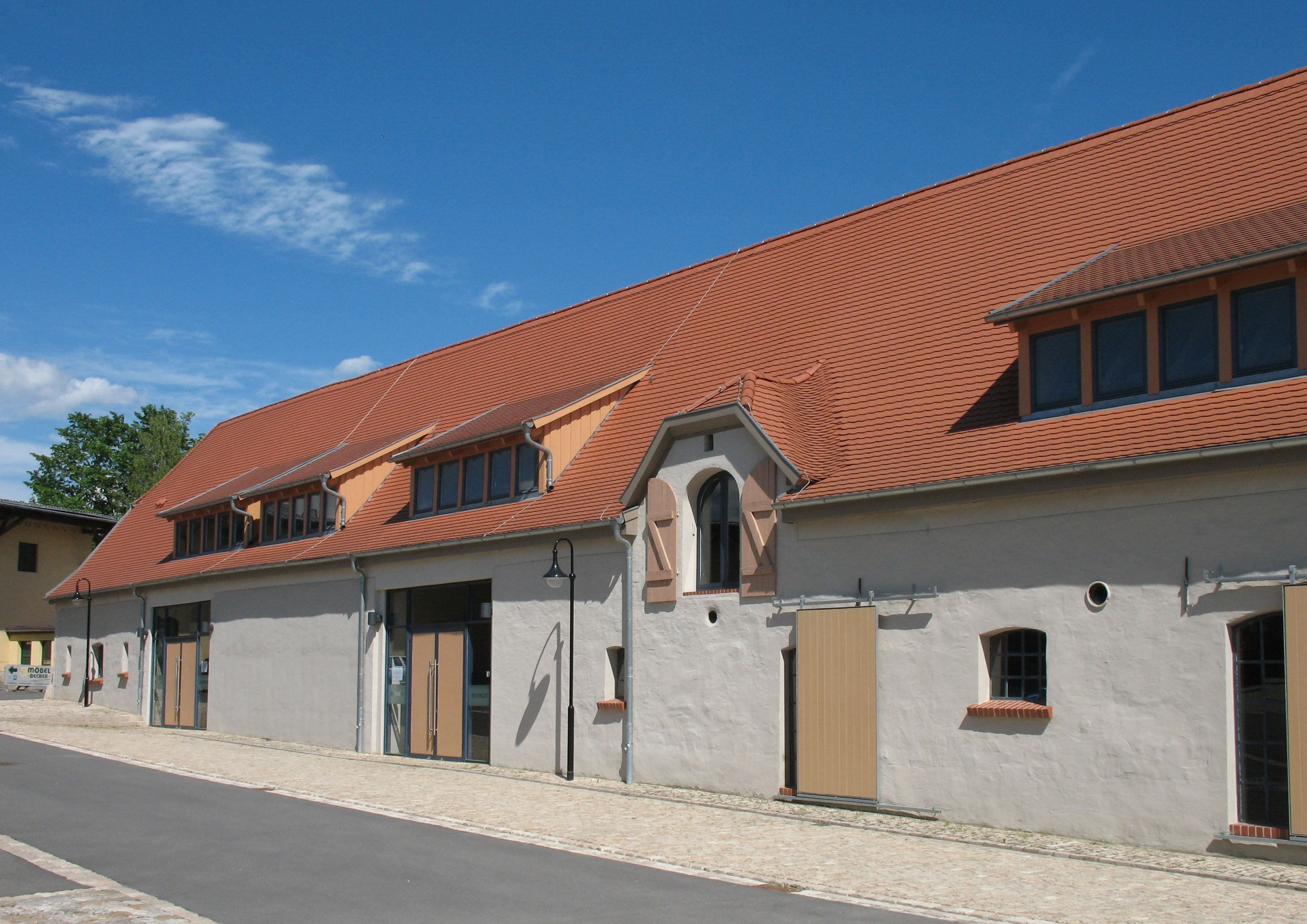
