= Žďákov Bridge =

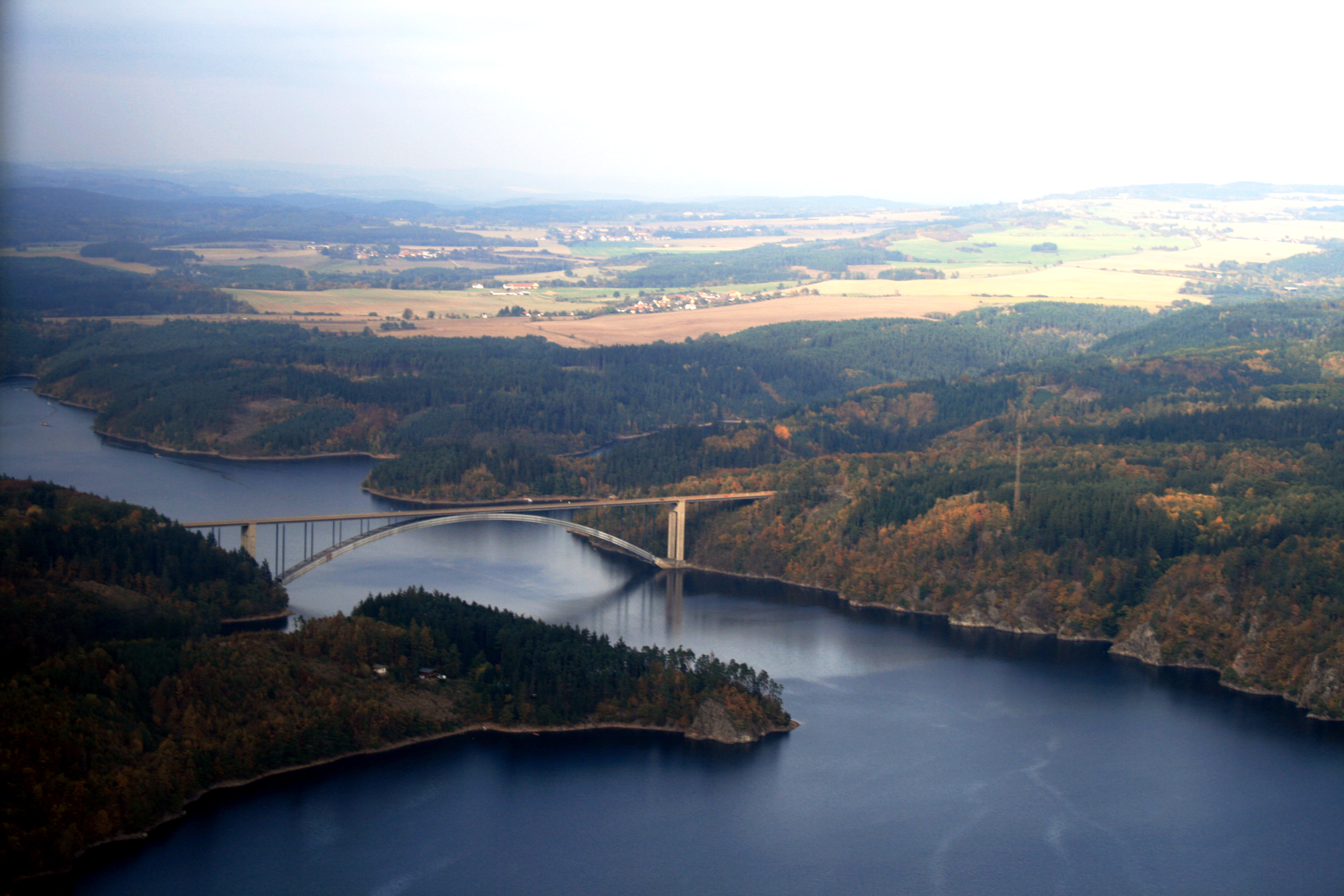
- Air photo of bridge Žďákovský most
- Coordinates: 49°30′16″N 14°11′0″E
- Carries: road
- Crosses: Vltava
- Locale: Orlík nad Vltavou, Kostelec nad Vltavou
- Official name: Žďákovský most

Characteristics
- Design: arch bridge
- Total length: 543 metres (1,781 ft)
- Width: 13.5 metres (44 ft)
- Height: 46.9 metres (154 ft)
- Longest span: 379.6 metres (1,245 ft)
- Clearance above: 50 metres (164 ft)

History
- Opened: 1967

Statistics
- Daily traffic: 3621

Location
- Interactive map of Žďákov Bridge

The Žďákov Bridge is a steel arch bridge that spans the Vltava between Orlík nad Vltavou and Kostelec nad Vltavou in Písek District, Czech Republic. At the time of its completion in 1967, it was the longest arch bridge in Czechoslovakia and the supported arch bridge with the longest span in the world.

It is situated on the road between Tábor and Plzeň, near Orlík nad Vltavou. The total length of the bridge is 543 m (1,781 ft), including approach spans. The main span is 362 m (1,188 ft).

Construction of the bridge was started simultaneously with the construction of Orlík Dam in 1957. The price of the bridge was 71 million CSK and was completed in 1967. It was named after the nearby village, flooded during the construction of the Orlík Dam. In 2001 the bridge was awarded as Bridge of the Century in the category of steel road bridges by Czech engineers during the Mosty 2001 symposium.

== See also ==
- List of longest arch bridge spans
