= Caroline McQuarrie =

New Zealand artist

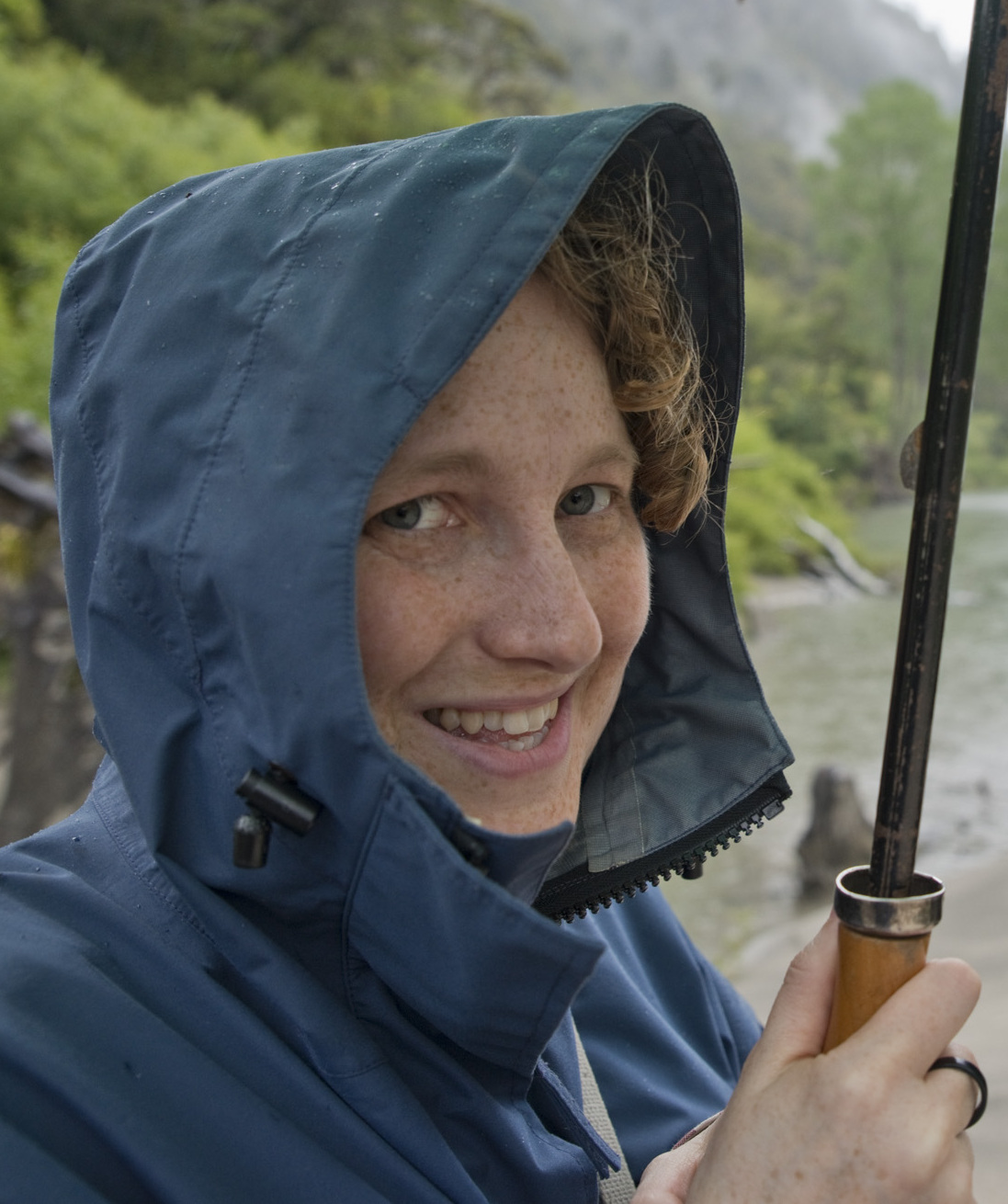
- McQuarrie in 2014
- Born: Caroline Lucy McQuarrie; 1975 (age 50–51); Greymouth, New Zealand
- Known for: Photography, textiles
- Website: carolinemcquarrie.com

Caroline Lucy McQuarrie (born 1975) is a New Zealand artist and senior lecturer in photography at Massey University in Wellington. McQuarrie's work explores social, colonial and land-use histories, and the role of photography and hand-crafted textiles in representing or questioning these complex narratives.

== Life ==
McQuarrie was born in 1975 in Greymouth, on the West Coast of the South Island. Her father, Bob McQuarrie, was a potter and her mother, Barbara McQuarrie, a textile artist. McQuarrie enjoyed drawing from an early age, and was influenced by friends of her family, photographer Frank Simpson and potter Daphne Simpson, who together ran Coast Craft in Greymouth. Daphne taught McQuarrie to draw and paint, and she studied photography and painting in her final year of high school. At the University of Canterbury, McQuarrie studied photography, completing a Bachelor of Fine Arts (BFA) degree in 1997.

After graduating, McQuarrie worked as a technician in photography laboratories in the United Kingdom, where she learnt and refined her skills with photo retouching and Adobe Photoshop. McQuarrie returned to New Zealand in 2002 and gained a Master of Fine Arts (MFA) from Massey University in Wellington in 2005. By this time she was also working in the university's photography department as a tutor, a job which became full time. McQuarrie is a Senior Lecturer in Photography at Massey University's College of Creative Arts Toi Rauwhārangi in Wellington.

== Artistic career ==
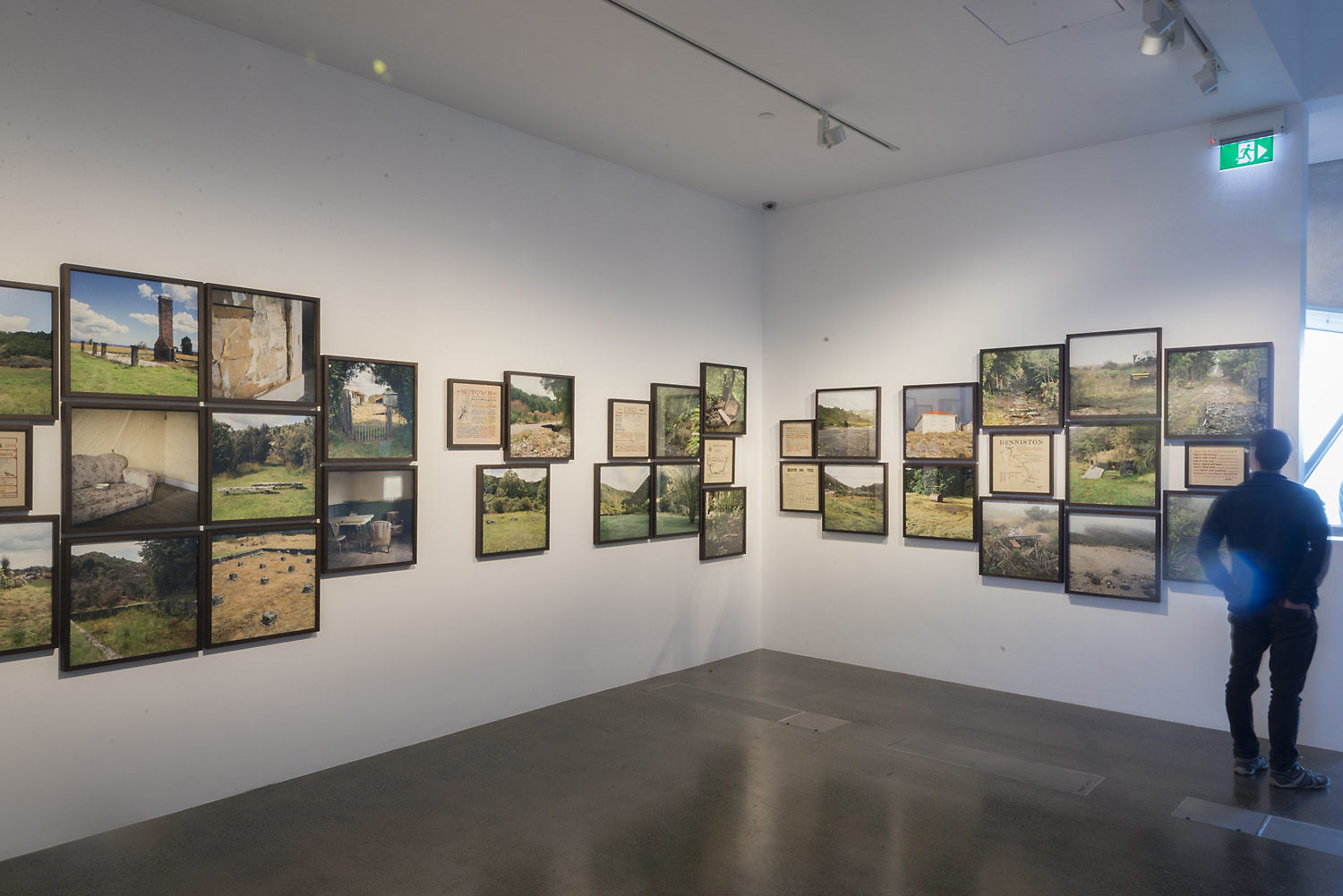
No Town, Te Uru Waitākere Contemporary Gallery, Titirangi, 2015

In 2010, McQuarrie was an artist in residence at Samuel Marsden Collegiate School for five weeks. Work created during the residency was exhibited as Reasons for Silence, at the Toi Pōneke gallery, Wellington in 2010. Reviewer Mark Bolland, noted that '[e]scaping the loudness, McQuarrie explores memory, domesticity, belonging and the values of handmade things.' In 2023, McQuarrie undertook the 8 week Gullies Arts Residency in the Rangitīkei District. The main work McQuarrie produced during the residency, ‘Gullies’, was a finalist in the 2025 Molly Morpeth Canaday Award.

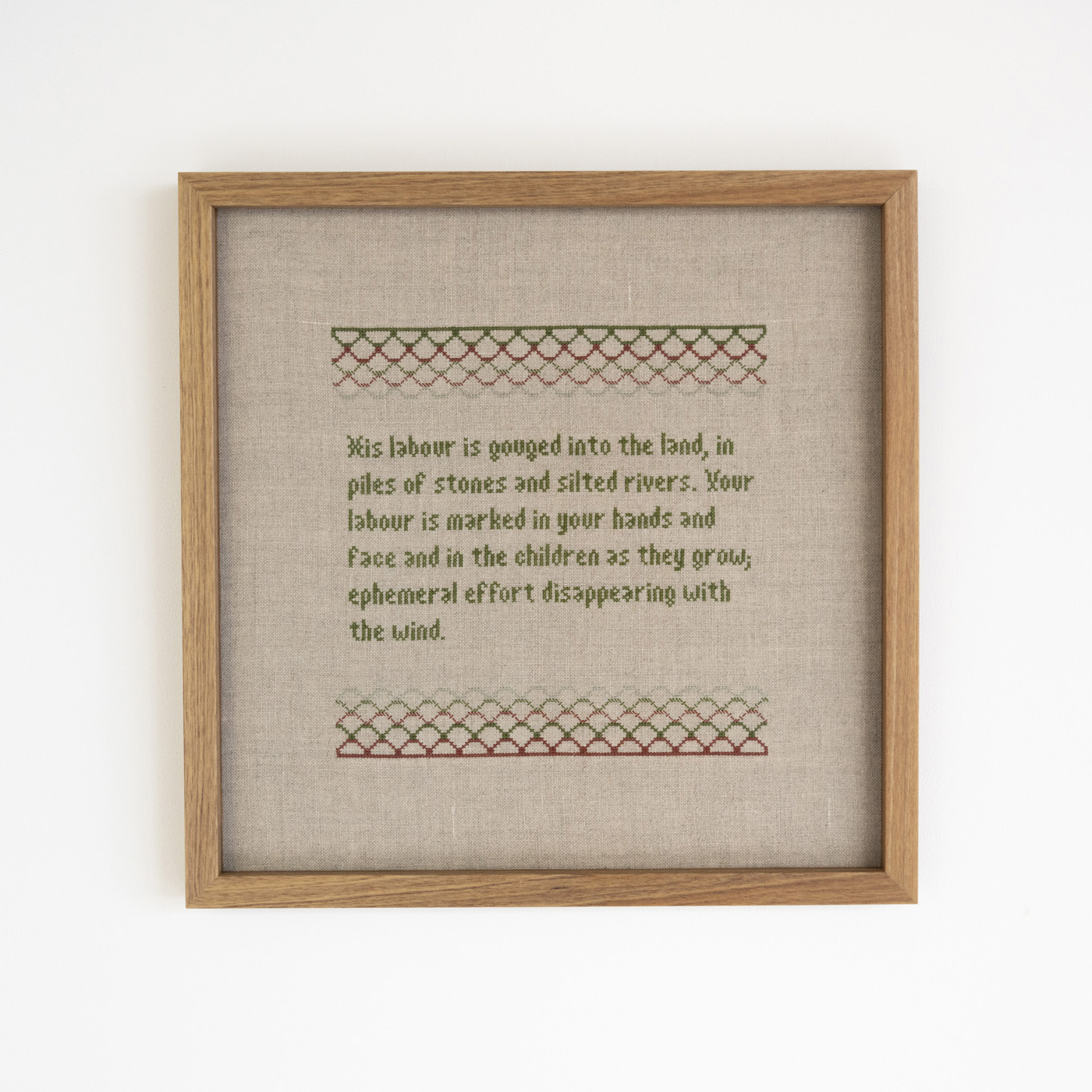
His labour is gouged into the land (2021), from The New Sun exhibition, Jhana Millers Gallery, Wellington

McQuarrie's work often explores personal and family histories, particular of early Pākehā settler women, combining photography and textiles in her art. One of her photography projects has been sites of former mining settlements such as Waiuta in the West Coast region. Photographing former mining settlements - referred to as 'ghost towns' - near where she grew up lead to McQuarrie's series No Town. The settlement of Waiuta and the photographer and miner who lived there, Joseph Divis (1885-1967), has informed and inspired aspects of McQuarrie's process.

McQuarrie has used alternative photography techniques like cyanotype and photograms, and incorporates crochet, sewing, and stitching into her work. McQuarrie counts Australian photographer Anne Ferran among her influences.

For the 2018 exhibition Prospects Fearful, McQuarrie and fellow artist Shaun Matthews, researched the 1846 journey of explorer Thomas Brunner and his Māori guides from Nelson to the West Coast and back. The finished work included large fabric-printed photographs taken with a pinhole camera, embroidered samplers with texts from Brunner's diary, and a collection of pāraerae sandals woven from harakeke.

In 2021, Jhana Millers Gallery started representing McQuarrie and her first solo show with the dealer gallery was The New Sun, which included linen samplers embroidered with the imagined words of pioneer women, complemented by colour photographs of the landscapes transformed by mining.

== Significant works ==
- This is the First Day of My Life (2008–09), a floor work made of recycled wool, cotton, and acrylic

== Select solo exhibitions ==
- Reasons for Silence. 2010, Toi Pōneke Gallery, Te Whanganui-a-Tara Wellington.
- Artifact. 19 June – 21 July 2012, Blue Oyster Art Project Space, Dunedin.
- No Town. 24 April 2014 – 23 August 2015, Aratoi, Masterton; Carnegie Gallery, Hokitika; Left Bank Art Gallery, Greymouth; Te Uru Waitākere, Auckland.
- Homewardbounder. 1 April – 25 April 2015, Enjoy Public Art Gallery, Te Whanganui-a-Tara Wellington.
- Waiuta. 16 November – 10 December 2015, Plymouth University, United Kingdom.
- The New Sun. 11 February – 13 March 2021, Jhana Millers Gallery, Te Whanganui-a-Tara Wellington.
- The Blasted Heath. 2022, Jhana Millers Gallery, Te Whanganui-a-Tara Wellington.
- How deep into the earth we sink. 2024, Jhana Millers Gallery, Te Whanganui-a-Tara Wellington.
- Like The Turf. 2 November 2024 - 26 January 2025, Forrester Gallery, Ōamaru.
- The land, again. 31 January 2026 - 19 April 2026, Aratoi Wairarapa Museum of Art and History, Masterton.

== Select group exhibitions ==
- The Hive Hums With Many Minds. 12 March - 24 May 2016, Te Tuhi, Pakuranga, Auckland, curated by Bruce E. Phillips.
- Prospects Fearful. With Shaun Matthews, 2018 - 2021, Suter Art Gallery, Nelson; Carnegie Gallery, Hokitika Museum; Left Bank Art Gallery, Greymouth; Hastings City Art Gallery, Heretaunga.
- She Shed: Contemporary Wool Craft. 17 March 2022 - 16 October 2022, Dowse Art Museum, Lower Hutt, curated by Dr Bronwyn Lloyd.
- Slow Burn: Women and Photography | Ahi Tāmau: Māreikura Whakaahua. 1 March 2026 - 31 January 2027, Museum of New Zealand Te Papa Tongarewa, Te Whanganui-a-Tara Wellington.

== Collections ==
- Dowse Art Museum, Lower Hutt.
- City Art Collection, Wellington.
- The Suter Art Gallery Te Aratoi o Whakatū, Nelson.
- Museum of New Zealand Te Papa Tongarewa, Wellington.
