= Amalie Scholl =

German composer (1823–1879)

Amalie Karoline Luise Scholl (28 September 1823 - 18 September 1879) was a German composer who wrote songs and works for piano. She published under the name Amalie Scholl.

Scholl was born and died in Dresden. Little is known about her education or her husband, Gatspar. She composed some piano pieces, as well as the following songs:

== Works ==
- “Abendfriede” opus 4 no. 2 (text by August Heinrich Hoffmann von Fallersleben)
- “Auf der Wartburg” opus 2 no. 3 (text by Adolf Boettger)
- “Aus dem Frühlingstagebuch” opus 4 no. 1 (text by Emanuel Geibel)
- “Das ewige Lied” opus 2 no. 5 (text by Christian Bohmer)
- “Die Lilien glühn” from Drei Lieder, (text by Emanuel Geibel)
- “Die Sprachschülerin” opus 3 (text by Friedrich Rückert)
- “Einst wirst du schlummern” opus 2 no. 2 (text by Albert Trager)
- “Frühlingsfreude” opus 5 no. 1 (text by Maria Elisabeth, Gräfin von Schlik zu Bassano und Weisskirchen, as Gräfin Elise Schlick)
- “In dunkles Abendroth” opus 5 no. 2 (text by Moritz Horn)
- “Maienglöcklein” opus 2 no. 1 (text by August Heinrich Hoffmann von Fallersleben)
- “Mein Kirchlein” opus 2 no. 4 (text by Carl Ebersberger)
- “Reue” from Drei Lieder, (text by Emanuel Geibel)
- “Siehst du das Meer?” from Drei Lieder (text by Emanuel Geibel)
- “So schlaf in Ruh!” (text by August Heinrich Hoffmann von Fallersleben)
