= Adolf Böttger =

German translator and poet (1815-1870)

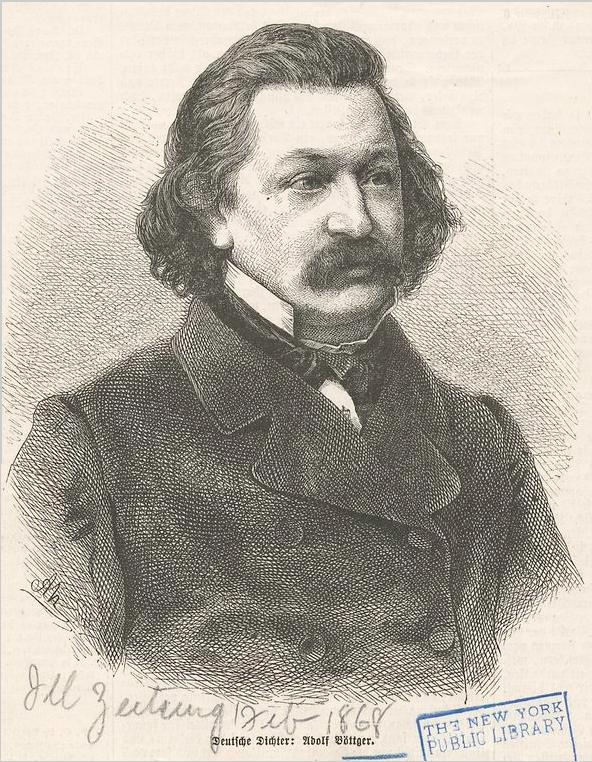
- Born: May 21, 1815; Leipzig, Germany
- Died: November 16, 1870 (aged 55); Gohlis, Germany
- Citizenship: Germany
- Education: Leipzig University
- Occupations: Translator, poet

Adolf Böttger (21 May 1815 in Leipzig – 16 November 1870 in Gohlis, now part of Leipzig) was a German translator and poet. As a translator, he created German versions of works in the English language, a major project being the translation of the complete works of Byron.

== Education ==
He studied at the University of Leipzig, and won high praise as a translator of the English poets, including the complete works of Byron (1840, and in frequent and variously arranged editions), works of Pope (1842), the poems of Goldsmith (1843) and of Milton (1846).

== Career ==
He also made renderings of Ossian (1847 and 1856); Shakespeare's As You Like It, Midsummer Night's Dream, and Much Ado about Nothing (1847); Racine's Phèdre; Ponsard's Odyssée (1853); and Longfellow's Hiawatha (1856).

His own works, displaying often the influence of English prototypes, include: Gedichte (Poems, 1846), Die Pilgerfahrt der Blumengeister (Pilgrimage of the flower spirits, 1851); Das Buch der Sachsen (The book of the Saxons, 1858); and Neue Lieder und Dichtungen (New songs and poems, 1868). One of his most idyllic productions is Goethe's Jugendliebe, a description of some of Goethe's love affairs. The German composer Amalie Scholl used Bottger’s text for her song “Auf der Wartburg.”
