= Jan Bedřich Kittl =

Czech composer (1806–1868)

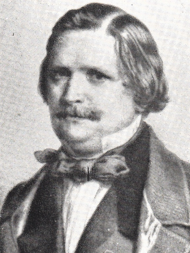

Jan Bedřich Kittl (German: Johann Friedrich Kittl; 8 May 1806 – 20 July 1868) was a Czech composer.

== Biography ==
Kittl was born in Orlík on 8 May 1806. His birth year has been given incorrectly as 1805 or 1809 in various sources. After studying law in Prague, Kittl studied music with Václav Tomášek. From 1843 to 1864, he headed the Prague Conservatory.

Kittl became famous for his operas, which have had great success in Prague. He also wrote chamber music, songs and four symphonies, including the widely played E-flat Symphony "Lovecka" (Jagdsinfonie Op. 8, 1838).

He died in Leszno, Poland on 20 July 1868, at the age of 62.

== Operas ==
- Daphnis' Grave (lost)
- Bianca and Giuseppe (or the French before Nice), libretto by Richard Wagner based on Heinrich Koenig's novel The High Bride 1848
- Forest Flower, libretto by Johann Carl Hickel 1852
- The Iconoclast Libretto: Julius Edward Hartmann 1854

== Songs ==
- "Glaubet nicht es wären Tränen" (text by Elise Schlick)
