= Fritz Hofmann (chemist) =

German organic chemist (1866–1956)

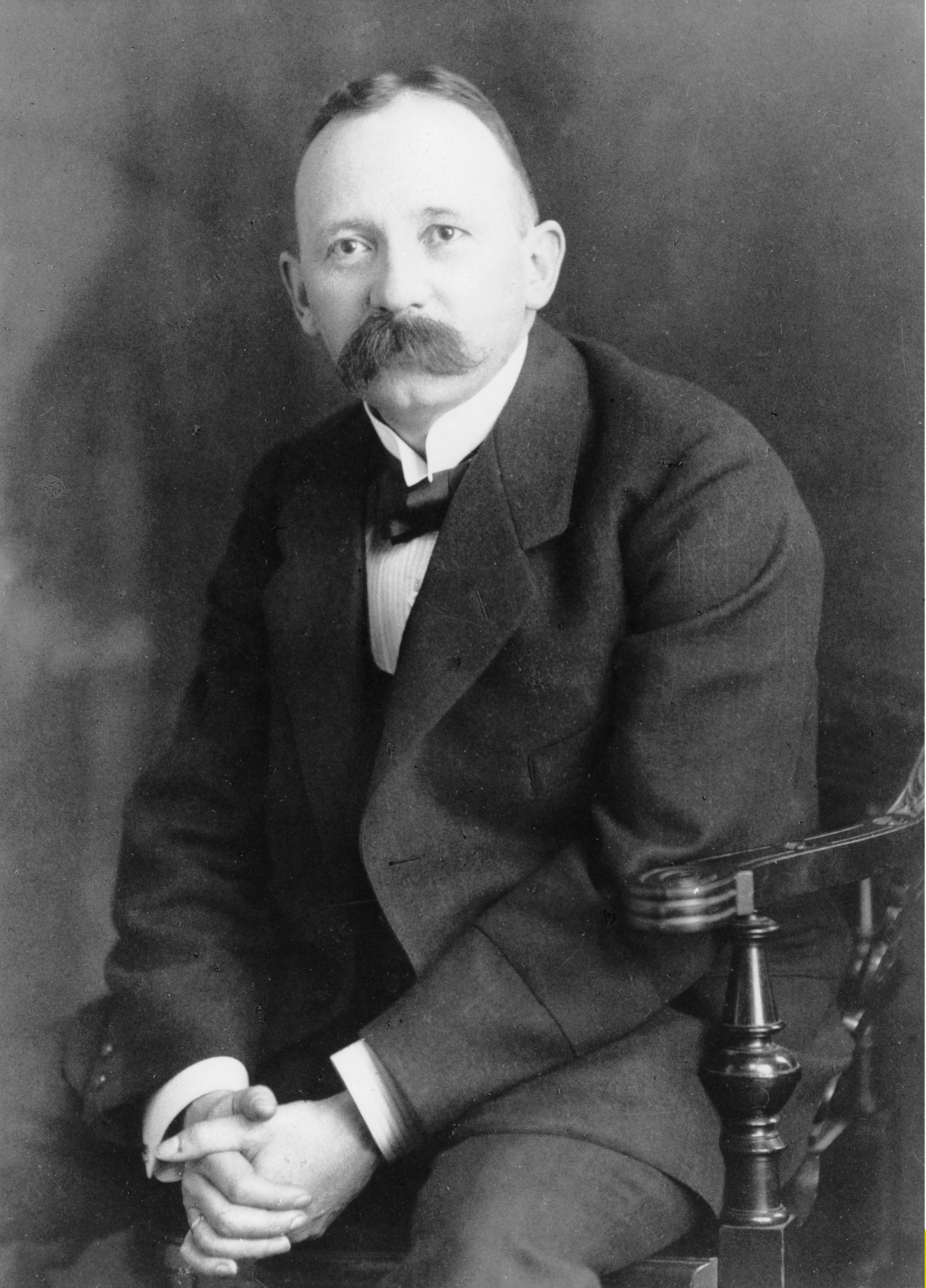
Prof. Dr. phil. Dr. med. h. c. Fritz Hofmann

Friedrich "Fritz" Carl Albert Hofmann (2 November 1866 in Kölleda, Province of Saxony, Kingdom of Prussia – 22 October 1956 in Hanover, West Germany) was a German organic chemist who first synthesized rubber.

Hofmann studied chemistry in Rostock. On 12 September 1909, he filed a patent for the manufacture of the world's first synthetic rubber.

== Awards and honors ==
- 1912 Emil Fischer Medal in Gold from the Association of German Chemists (VDCh) for his groundbreaking research on synthetic rubber
- Honorary Plaque of the German Rubber Society (DKG) for his contributions to rubber technology
- 1928 Honorary doctorate in medicine (Dr. med. h. c.) from the Technical University of Breslau for his pioneering work in the fields of pharmacy and medicine
- 1936 Honorary citizen of the city of Breslau on the occasion of his 70th birthday
- 1936 Honorary citizen of the city of Kölleda on the occasion of his 70th birthday
  - At the same time, a commemorative plaque was affixed to the house where he was born.
- 1937 Officially nominated for the Nobel Prize in Chemistry in 1937
- 1941 The street in Kölleda where he was born was renamed Prof.-Hofmann-Straße on the occasion of his 75th birthday.
- 2 November 1941 Goethe Medal for Art and Science from Hitler (presented to him in Breslau by Karl Hanke)
- 1942 Honorary Doctor of Engineering (Dr.-Ing. E. h.) from the Polytechnic University of Temeschburg (Timișoara) in Romania
- December 1954 Order of Merit of the Federal Republic of Germany, Commander's Cross of the Order of Merit (Großes Verdienstkreuz, Great Cross of Merit)
- In Kölleda, the "Prof. Fritz Hofmann" State Gymnasium bears his name.

== See also ==
- Sergei Vasiljevich Lebedev
- List of German inventors and discoverers
