= Elise Schlick =

German-Bohemian composer and poet (1792–1855)

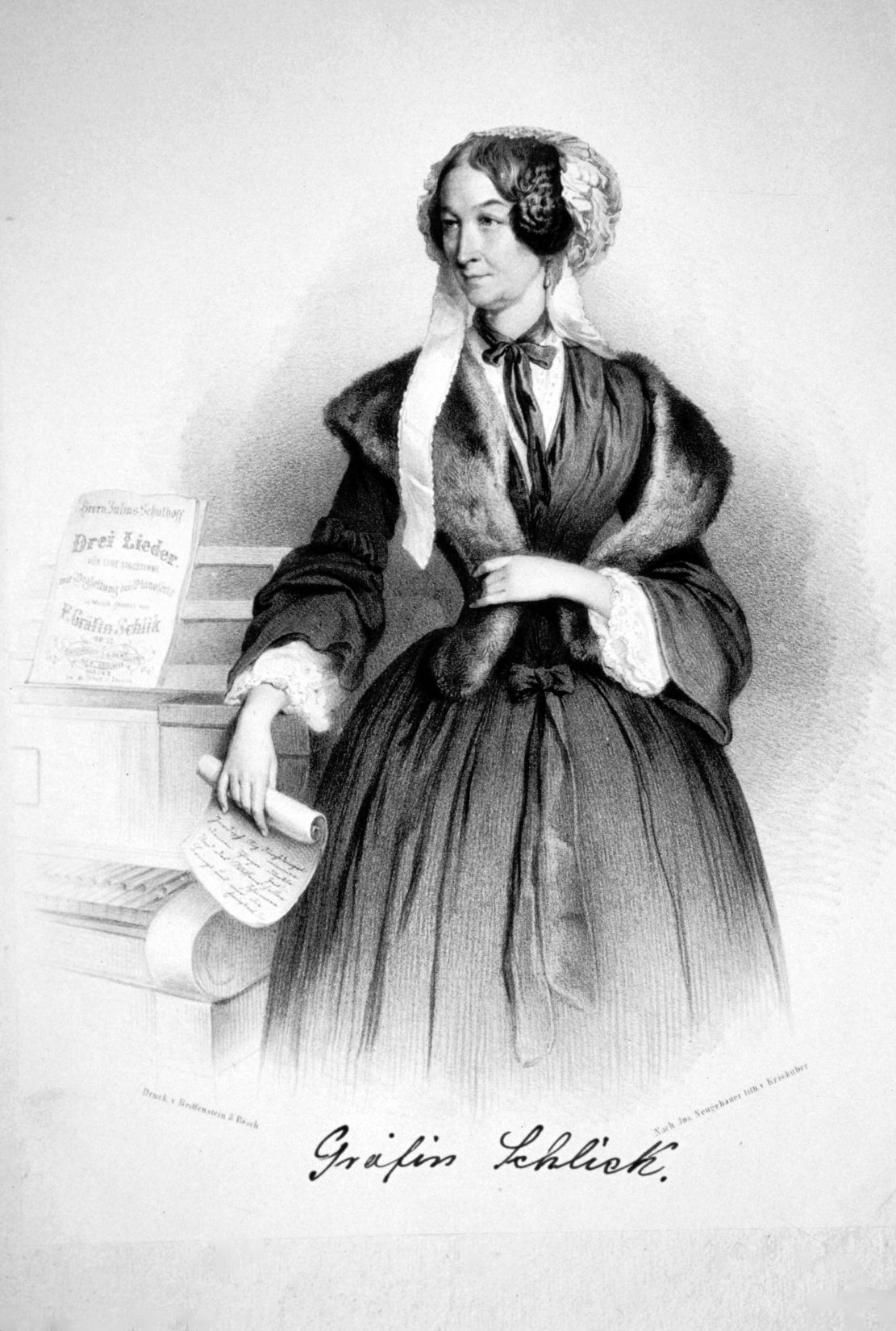
Schlick in 1850

Maria Elisabeth, Countess of Schlick (German: Maria Elisabeth, Gräfin von Schlick zu Bassano und Weißkirchen, Czech: Marie Alžběta Šliková; c. 1790 – 14 December 1855) was a Bohemia-born composer and poet. She composed music for lieder and also wrote poetry that other composers set to music. She published under the name Countess Elise Schlick or Gräfin Elise Schlick. Although Schlick is often described as German, some sources list her birthplace as Prague and her birth year as 1792.

Little is known about Schlick's early life or education. She was the sister-in-law of Count Franz zu Bassano und Weisskirchen, an Austrian general who helped suppress the Hungarian uprising in 1849. She was described as a patroness of Franz Liszt in Prague.

Schlick produced compositions through at least opus 5. Her musical compositions were published by Franz Gloggl and C. A. Spina in Vienna; August Cranz in Hamburg; and Schott in Mainz. Her musical compositions and poetry included:

== Music ==
- "Geisternacht"
- "Gute Nacht"
- "Lieb Liebchen, leg's Händchen aufs Herze," opus 5 (text by Heinrich Heine)
- "Lieder der Nacht"

== Poetry ==
- "Die Lüfte weh'n so lind" (music by Conradin Kreutzer
- "Du frische Saat, heraus/Frühlingsfreude" (music by Amalie Scholl)
- "Glaubet nicht es wären Tränen" (music by Jan Bedřich Kittl)
