= Václav Tomášek =

Czech music educator and composer

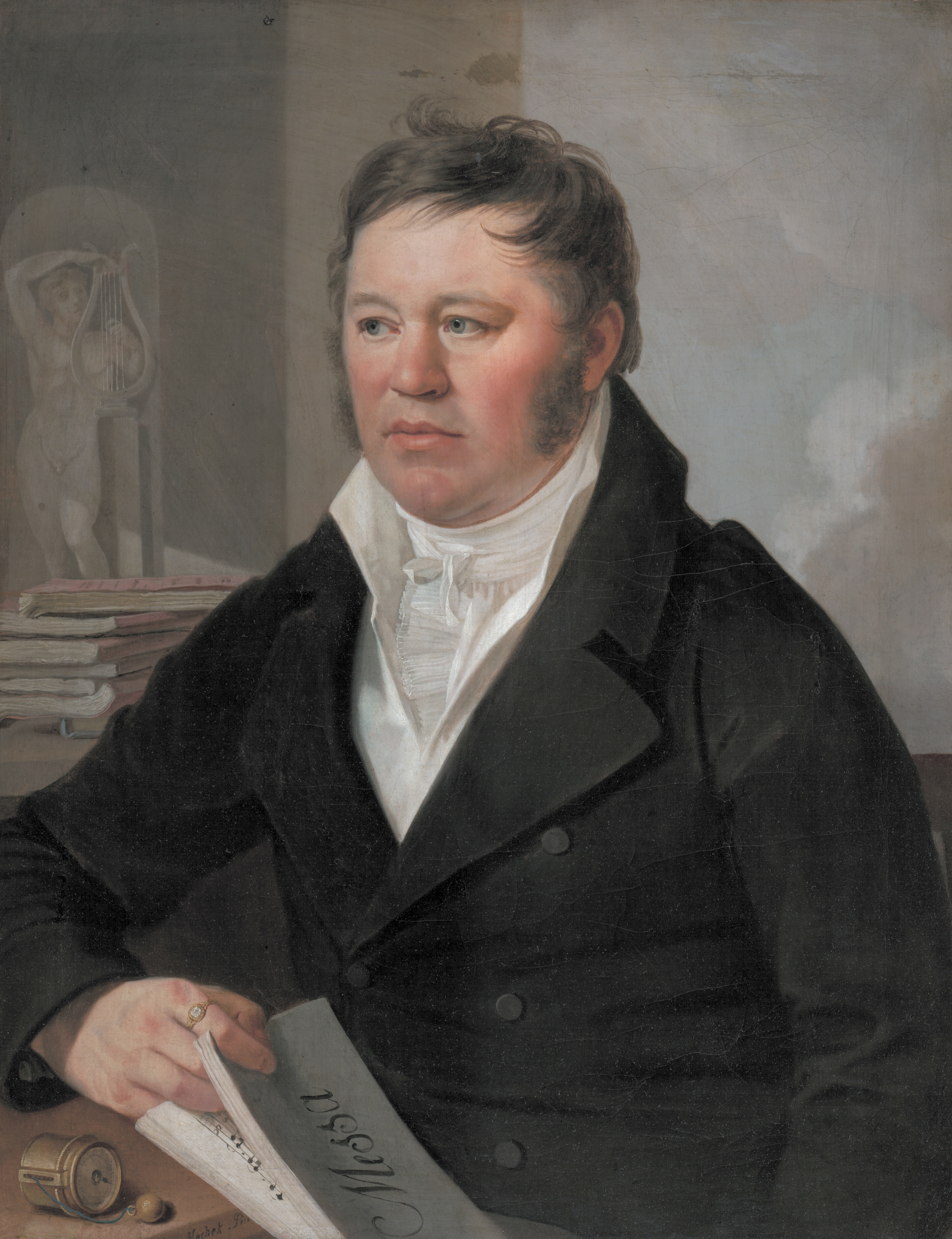
Václav Jan Křtitel Tomášek

Václav Jan Křtitel Tomášek (German: Wenzel Johann Tomaschek; 1774 – 1850) was an Austrian-Bohemian, by other accounts a Czech composer and music teacher. He was known as the Musical Pope of Prague. In the words of Kenneth Delong, "Highly opinionated, often sarcastic and projecting a sense of his own importance, Tomášek's memoirs also reveal him to be deeply concerned about all things artistic and intellectual: a man of courage and idealism, unflinching in his pursuit of truth in music and in life."

== Life ==
Václav Tomášek was born in 1774.

As a pianist, he was an autodidact, becoming one of the most important piano teachers of Prague for a century. Tomášek studied violin and singing with Wolf. Until 1824 he worked as a piano teacher in aristocratic families. Afterwards he created a considerable school of music; among its most well-known pupils were Jan Voříšek, Alexander Dreyschock, Johann Friedrich Kittl and Eduard Hanslick. Tomášek made the acquaintance of Beethoven, and also of Goethe, whose poems he set. He maintained correspondence with the Polish pianist and composer Maria Agata Szymanowska. His autobiography was published in German, as well as in a Czech translation. He lived at number 15 Tomášská Street in Prague. The building bears a memorial plaque to him in Czech and German.

Václav Tomášek died in 1850.

== Style ==
Tomášek wrote a good deal for the piano and became a forerunner of the lyric piano piece which later reached its apogee in the works of Schubert and Chopin. At first he remained loyal to the Classical style, but later was influenced by the newly born Romanticism. An important part of his oeuvre are his songs. Besides songs to Goethe's German poems he composed also songs to the patriotic lyrics of Czech authors. He composed short pieces for glass harp and organ, and works for choir.

In 1823–24, he was one of the 50 composers who composed a variation on a waltz by Anton Diabelli for Vaterländischer Künstlerverein.

== Selected works ==
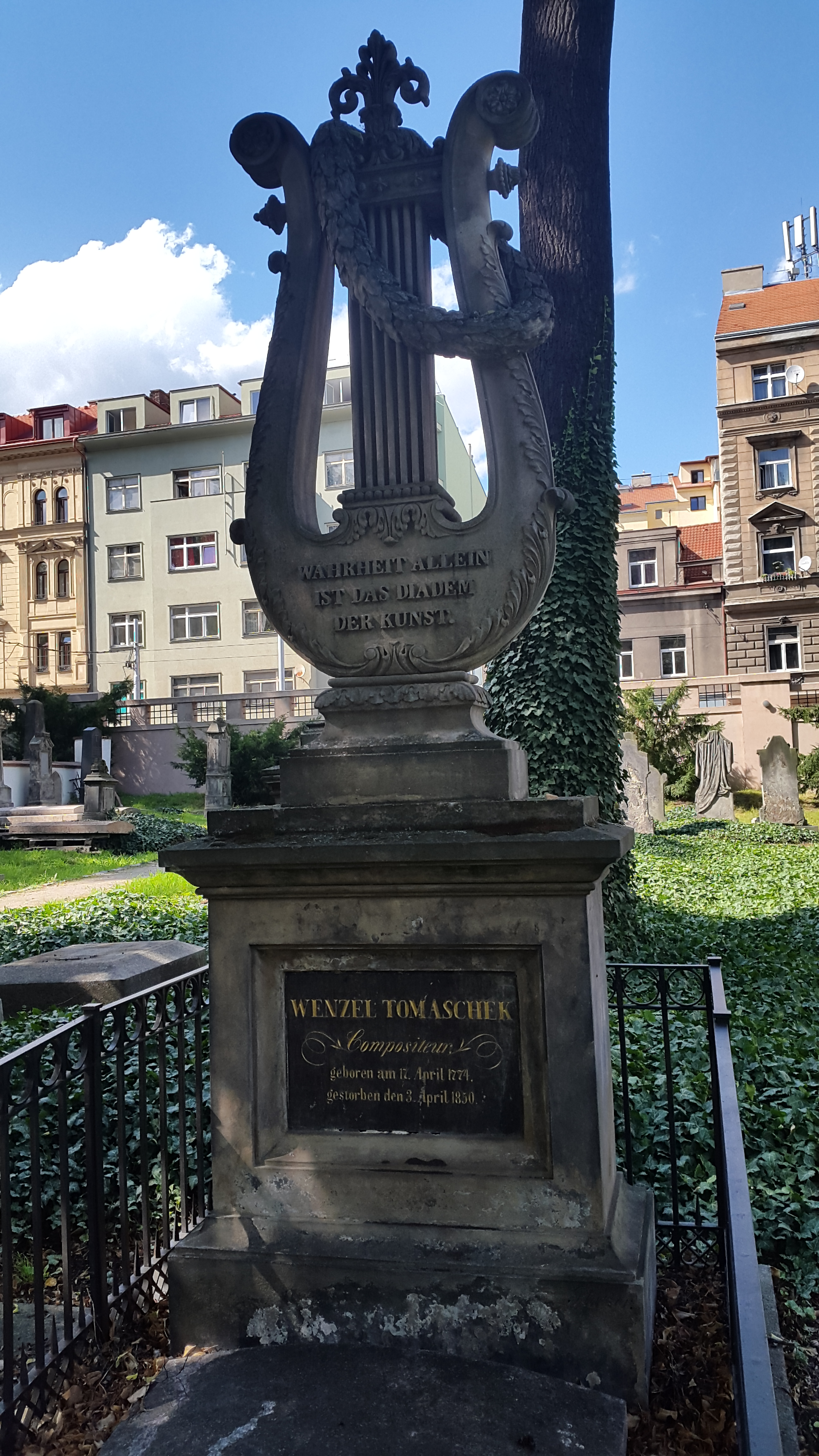
Wenzel Johann Tomaschek's grave at Malá Strana Cemetery in Prague

=== Piano ===
- Six sonatas
- Eclogues (42 pieces in 7 volumes, 1807–23)
- Rhapsodies (3 volumes, 1810–c. 1840)
- Dithyrambs, op. 65 (1818)

=== Chamber ===
- Grand trio for violin, viola and piano (1800)
- Contrapuntal string quartet (1805)
- Piano Quartet in E♭ major, op. 22

=== Orchestral ===
- Symphony in C major (1801)
- Symphony in E♭ major (1805)
- Symphony in D major (1807)
- Two piano concertos

=== Songs ===
- Lenora (ballad, 1805)
- Six songs (1813)
- Songs to poems by Goethe (1815)

=== Operas ===
- Seraphine (1811)
- Alvaro
- Sakuntala

=== Choral ===
- Requiem in C minor (1820)
- Missa Solemnis Op. 81
- Messa con Graduale et Offertorio Op. 46

== Sources ==
- Jaroslav Smolka (ed.): Malá encyklopedie hudby. Prague: Edition Supraphon, 1983.
