= Jos Divis =

New Zealand miner and photographer

Joseph Divis (28 February 1885 – 10 October 1967) was a Czech-born New Zealand miner and photographer. He lived and worked in Waiuta, New Zealand. His photographs of miners form a historical record of mining on the West Coast.

== Biography ==
Divis was born in Orlík, Austria-Hungary (now in the Czech Republic), on 28 February 1885. It is thought that he worked in mining in Germany before emigrating to New Zealand in 1909. On arrival, he worked as a coal miner at Blackball but moved to Waiuta in 1912 to work at the Blackwater gold mine. He remained in Waiuta for the rest of his life, apart from five years working at the Waihi mine in the North Island from 1919 to 1924, and visits to Europe in 1913 and from 1926 to 1930.

During World War II, Divis was interned on Matiu / Somes Island as an enemy alien. He was there from 1940 to 1943 even though he was naturalised as a British citizen in 1936.

Most residents of Waiuta left when the Blackwater Mine closed in 1951. Divis was one of the few remaining residents and acted as postmaster.

Divis used shutter time-release, which enabled him to appear in many of his photographs. Because of this he has been called the "inventor of the selfie". His photographs were published in the Auckland Weekly News and were also used as postcards and stereograms.

Divis died at Greymouth on 10 October 1967, and is buried in the Reefton cemetery.

== Legacy ==
Divis's photographs have been preserved and digitised by the Alexander Turnbull Library.

A biography of Divis Through the eyes of a miner: the photography of Joseph Divis was published in 2016.

The Department of Conservation is undertaking a project to restore Divis's house at Waiuta. Filmmakers Dave Kwant and Robin Janes made a documentary Jos – The Forgotten Photographer Who Saved a Town (2023) about Divis's life and work.

Divis work and archive has inspired and informed the work of artist and photographer Caroline McQuarrie. Most significantly, Divis' former home at Waiuta appears in McQuarrie's series No Town, held in the collection of the Museum of New Zealand Te Papa Tongarewa.
