= Waiuta =

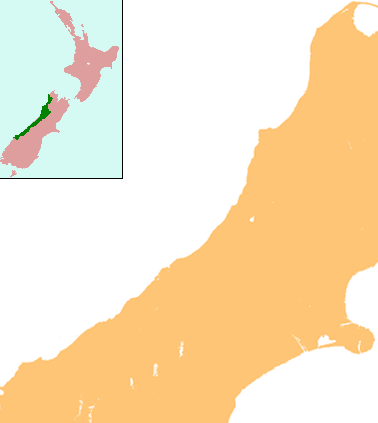
- Coordinates: 42°17′34″S 171°49′6″E
- Country: New Zealand
- Region: West Coast
- District: Buller District
- Electorates: West Coast-Tasman; Te Tai Tonga

Waiuta is the location of a historic mining town on the West Coast of the South Island of New Zealand. It is now abandoned and considered a ghost town. Located 58 km north of Greymouth and 21 km south of Reefton in Ikamatua, New Zealand, it was the site of a gold mine until 1951, when the collapse of the mine made it uneconomic. A number of buildings remain and there are still residents in what remains of the town. Nowadays Waiuta has become a tourist attraction, with few of the original buildings still intact that include the former police station, three cottages and the old barber shop.

== History ==
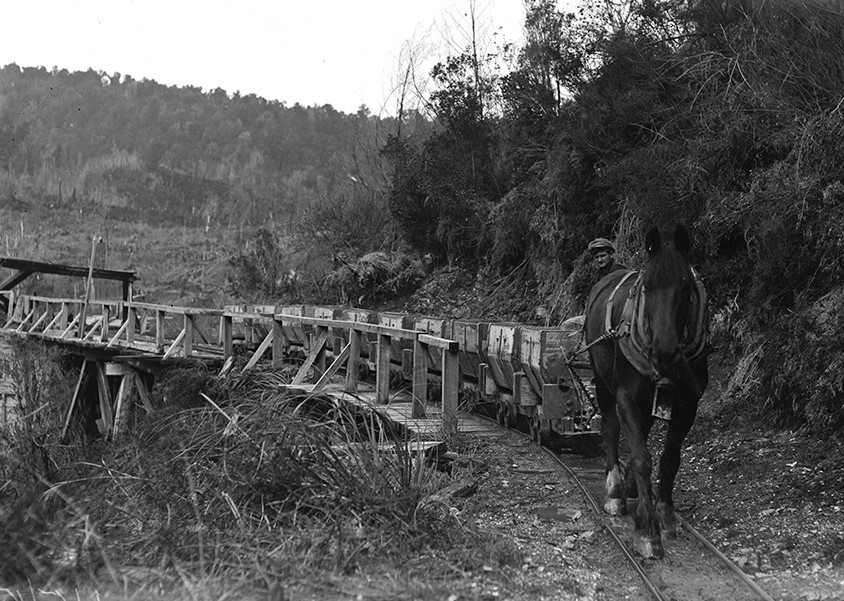
Blackwater Mine bush railway

The town of Waiuta was developed to provide accommodation for workers in the goldmine. The Birthday Quartz Reef was named after the date it was found: 9 November 1905 was King Edward VII’s birthday. The first mineshaft operated in 1908 called the Blackwater Shaft and was 563 m in depth. The mine was extended in 1926 with the acquisition of the adjacent Blackwater North claim, which was renamed the "Prohibition". The Prohibition shaft took over in 1938 and reached 879 m deep. The mine eventually produced almost 750,000 ounces (21.3 metric tons) of gold. Because of the expansion of the mine, more workers began to settle in the area. At first, people kept wanting to rent houses as they were unsure how long the mine was last. However, when the mine was well established by the early 1920s, workers were more willing to build houses and own shops. The area had eventually turned from a mine to a prosperous, growing town. Waiuta started to look less like a mining camp. Even though Waiuta had few residents, many people enjoyed playing outdoor sports, with rugby being the main sport.

== Prospering town ==
By 1936, there was a record 601 people living in Waiuta. Of those, many were from other countries, like Yugoslavia, Italy and Australia. It was in that year that the town had become the most ethnically diverse, more than most other parts of New Zealand. By 1910, a miners' hall was built, for social gatherings and meetings. Waiuta's first school was also built, and by 1933, there was a total of 113 children. The last major building to be built was the cottage hospital in 1916.

== Sudden decline ==
The Second World War triggered a gradual decline in the number of miners. Between 1939 and 1946, men employed by the company fell from 240 to 113. The amount of gold eventually reduced to less than one third of the pre-war amount, making it difficult to recruit miners after the war.

On 9 July 1951, the Blackwater Shaft collapsed and the flooded mine was abandoned. With no alternative employment in Waiuta, many people left to settle elsewhere. Buildings were dismantled, and within a couple of months Waiuta became a ghost town, with nothing to offer.

== Waiuta today ==
Nowadays, Waiuta is managed as a historic site for many tourists to visit, as very few buildings still remain. Waiuta offers overnight stays at the Waiuta lodge, where families can stay for as long as they wish. Tour guides are part of a group called “Friends of Waiuta” which was formed in 1985 to teach tourists the town's history, ecology of the area, and promote it as a tourist destination. They work with the Department of Conservation who manage the historic town and gold mines. The group includes over 120 working members and holds meetings three times a year. The Department of Conservation is undertaking a project to restore the house belonging to Jos Divis, a miner and photographer who documented life in the mines and Waiuta.

In 2020 Whispers of Gold: a tale of boom and bust and a West Coast Town that refused to die, a documentary film about Waiuta was released. A documentary Jos – The Forgotten Photographer Who Saved a Town (2023) was made about Jos Divis's life and work.

On 13 December 2019, it A $15 million commercial loan was announced the NZ government to Tasman Mining from the Provincial Growth Fund (PGF) to re-establish the Blackwater gold mine.

In an interview with RNZ, Lonely Planet's Oceania Editor Jessica Lockhart named Waiuta her favourite destination in New Zealand.

Demographics for the area are covered at Ikamatua.

== See also ==
- Mining in New Zealand
