= Flugplatz Sömmerda-Dermsdorf =

Sömmerda-Dermsdorf Airport Flugplatz Sömmerda-Dermsdorf
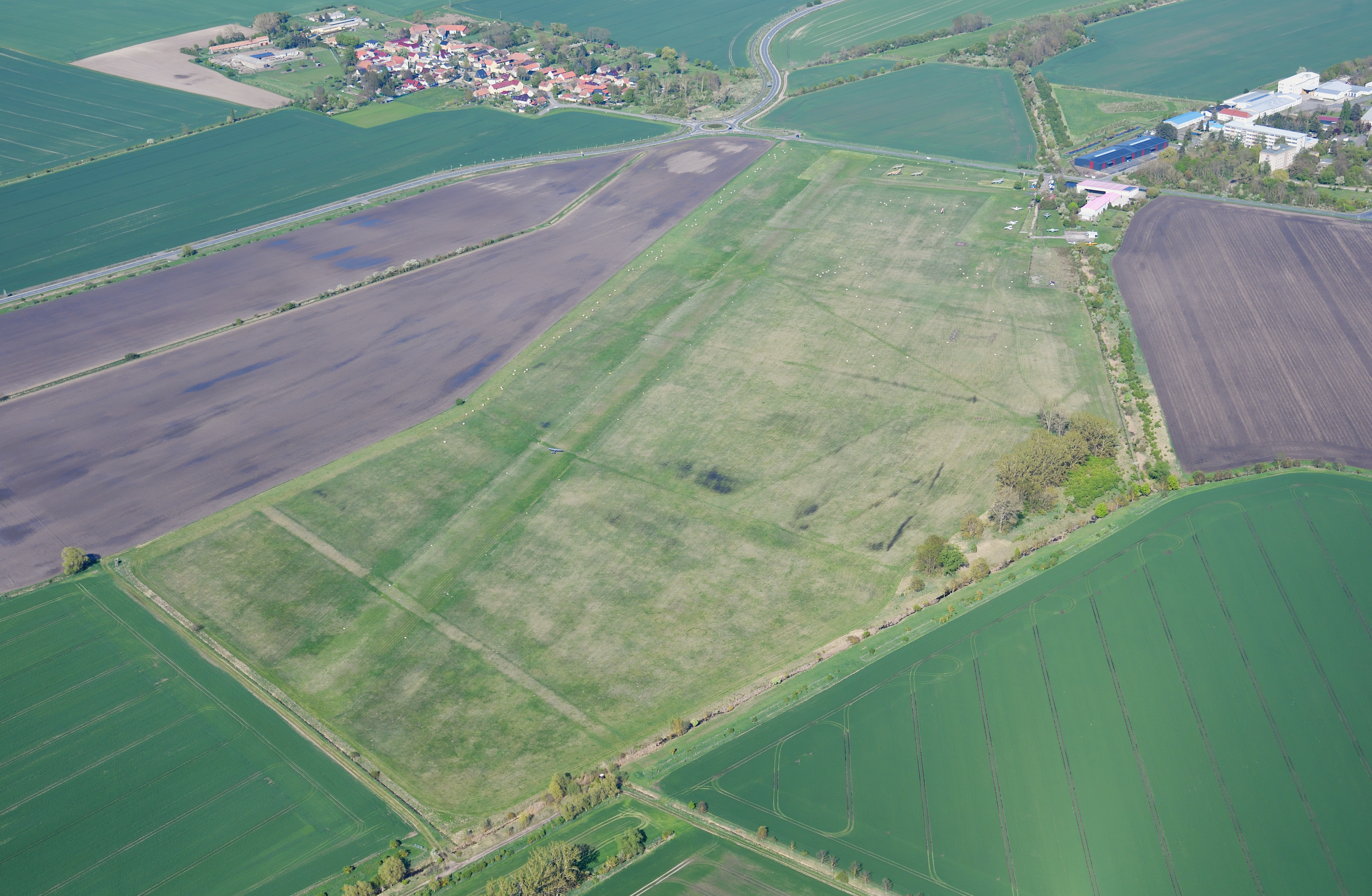
- IATA: none; ICAO: EDBS

Summary
- Airport type: Public
- Serves: Erfurt, Thuringia, Germany
- Location: Sömmerda
- Elevation AMSL: 451 ft / 137 m
- Coordinates: 51°11′53″N 11°11′47″E

Map
- Location of airport in Germany

Runways
Direction	Length		Surface
Direction	m	ft	Surface
07/25	925	3,035	Grass

Sömmerda-Dermsdorf Airport (German: Flugplatz Sömmerda-Dermsdorf, ICAO: EDBS) is a regional airport in Germany. It is located 3 nautical miles (6 km) northeast of Sömmerda and 14 kilometres (8 NM) north of Erfurt, in the German state of Thuringia. It supports general aviation with no commercial airline service scheduled.

== History ==
The airfield was built in 1934 as a military air base (Fliegerhorst) for the Luftwaffe and as a civilian "Air Office" (Luftzeugamt). The establishment of the airfield was a turning point for the town of Kölleda, which doubled in population as a result of the increase in employment after its opening in 1935. A railway connection was completed in 1936, along with the Fliegerhorts barracks. At the same time it was rebuilt into one of the largest Fliegerhorste in Germany. Over time 112 buildings were constructed.

During World War II, Fliegerhorst Kölleda became an aircraft maintenance facility, servicing mainly Dornier aircraft, and was classified as "secret". It stocked many parts for several models of Dornier bombers, but it had no flying units assigned. It was a long time before the Allies recognised the airfield. The reason was astonishingly simple: the Germans had live sheep grazing its fields for camouflage, and it was usually covered in a haze because of its boggy subsoil. A fake airfield (a smaller, lit version of Kölleda) further distracted attention from the actual air field. The airfield used a large portion of forced labour from countries like Belgium, France, the Netherlands and the Soviet Union. It was finally located by Allied reconnaissance aircraft and on 4 July 1944 the airfield was finally bombed in 5 waves between 9 and 10am. Seven people died on the ground in the attack.

The United States Army moved into the area in April 1945, and was converted by IX Engineering Command, Ninth Air Force into an Army Air Forces advanced Landing Ground, designated R-18. Air Force units used the airfield as a casualty evacuation and combat resupply airfield by the IX Air Service Command. After the German Capitulation on 8 May, it was abandoned.

On 1 July the Americans turned over the field over to the Russians as part of the Soviet Occupation zone of Germany. The Soviets closed the airfield and it was dismantled. A smaller airfield was later established by the East German government (German Democratic Republic) at the site, and it was used as a gliderfield, until it was closed by the East German government in 1979/1980. The airfield was partially converted into a residential area, but other parts became commercial areas. The entrance to the former Luftwaffe Fliegerhorst is now a home for elderly people.

A new flying club was established on the north side of the former airfield after the German reunification in 1990. It hosted the German Aerobatics championship in 1996. Today, it is mostly used for glider flying and parajumping from an Austrian Shorts Skyvan.

A former East German Air Forces of the National People's Army MiG-21, along with three more East German National People's Army aircraft are on static display at the airfield.
