= Orlík nad Vltavou =

- Municipality
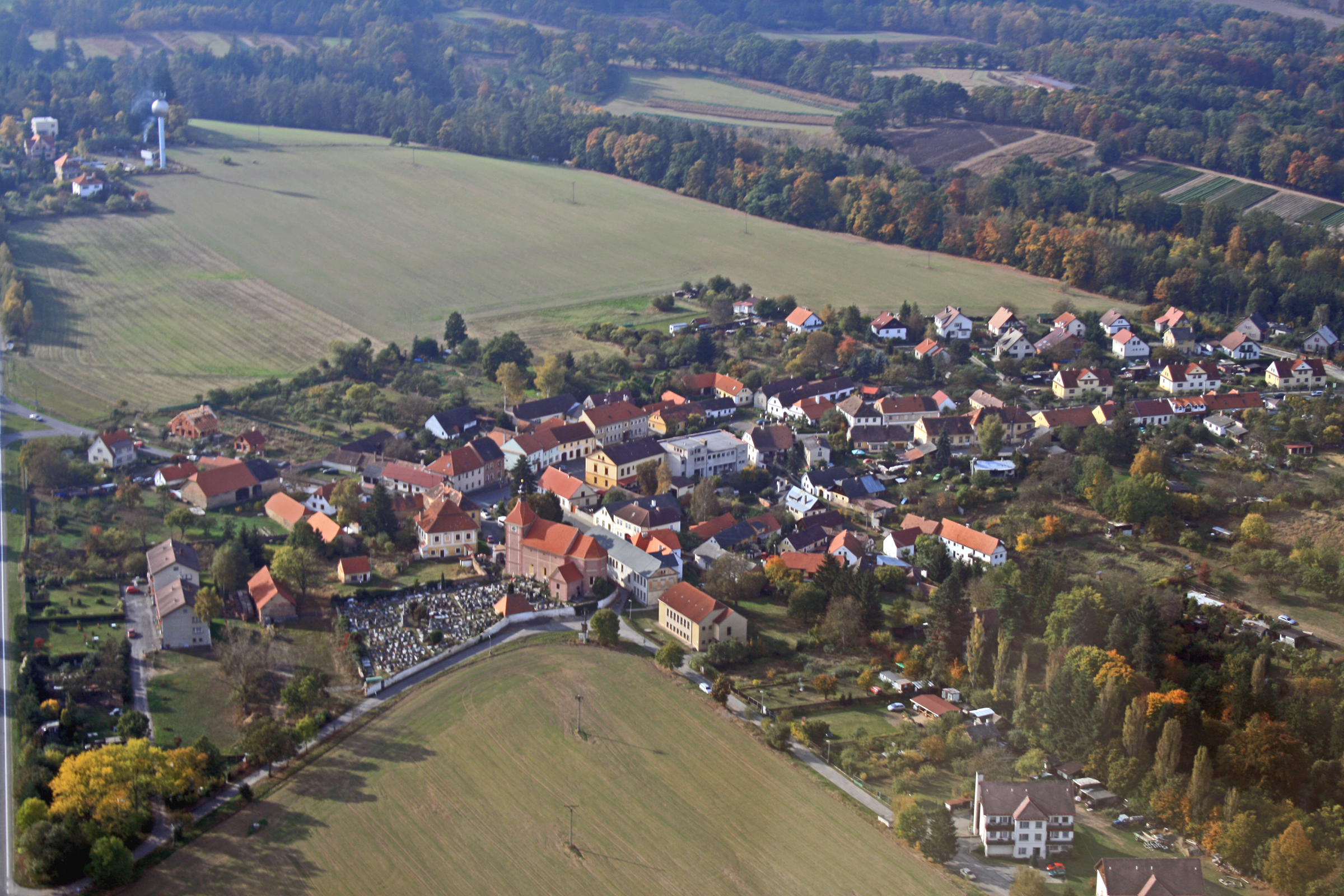
- Aerial view of Staré Sedlo

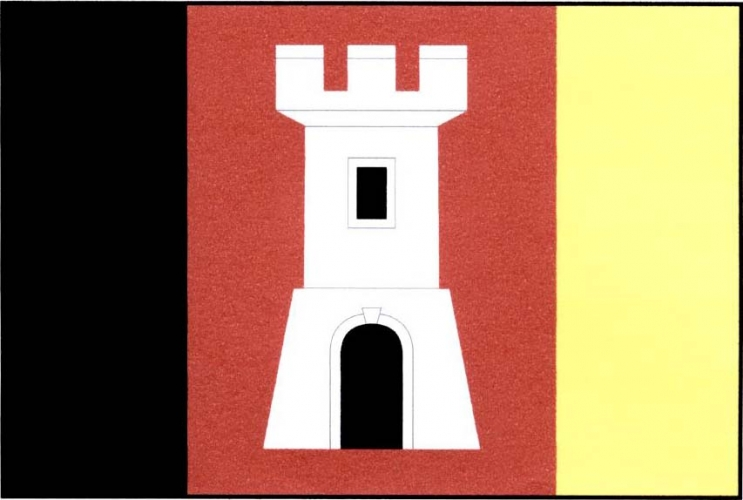
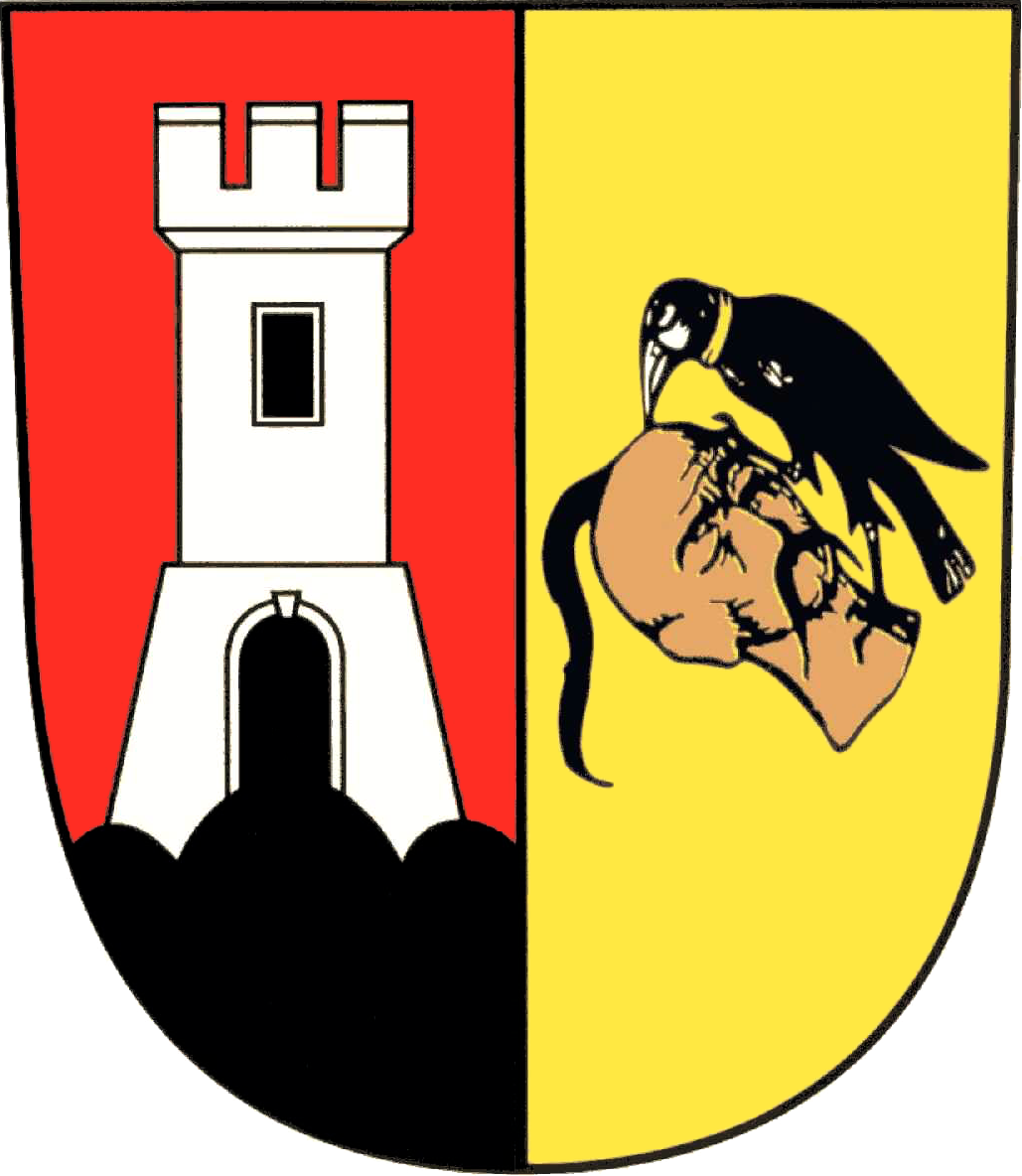
- Flag Coat of arms

- Location in the Czech Republic
- Coordinates: 49°30′39″N 14°9′53″E
- Country: Czech Republic
- Region: South Bohemian
- District: Písek
- First mentioned: 1251

Area
  - Total: 9.04 km^{2} (3.49 sq mi)
- Elevation: 390 m (1,280 ft)

Population (2026-01-01)
  - Total: 293
  - Density: 32.4/km^{2} (83.9/sq mi)
- Time zone: UTC+1 (CET)
  - Summer (DST): UTC+2 (CEST)
- Postal code: 398 07
- Website: www.orliknadvltavou.cz

Orlík nad Vltavou is a municipality and village in Písek District in the South Bohemian Region of the Czech Republic. It has about 300 inhabitants. It is known for the Orlík Castle, protected as a national cultural monument.

== Administrative division ==
Orlík nad Vltavou consists of two municipal parts (in brackets population according to the 2021 census):

- Orlík nad Vltavou (27)
- Staré Sedlo (239)

== Etymology ==
The name Orlík is a diminutive of the Czech word orel (i.e. 'eagle'). Orlík was a common name for medieval castles built on a rock, because they resembled an eagle sitting on its nest.

== Geography ==
Orlík nad Vltavou is located about 22 kilometres (14 mi) north of Písek and 58 km (36 mi) southwest of Prague. It lies mostly in the Benešov Uplands. The highest point is the hill Chlum at 502 m (1,647 ft) above sea level. The municipality lies on the shores of the Orlík Reservoir, built on the Vltava River.

== History ==
The first written mention of Orlík is a document from the period 1230–1251, when customs duties were collected on the Vltava River near Orlík, which was only a small wooden castle at that time. Until 1357, Orlík was a royal property; then it was owned by various noble families. In 1719, it was inherited by the Schwarzenberg family, who owned it until 1948.

== Demographics ==
Historical population

Year	Pop.	±%
1869	860	—
1880	903	+5.0%
1890	910	+0.8%
1900	851	−6.5%
1910	822	−3.4%

Year	Pop.	±%
1921	737	−10.3%
1930	611	−17.1%
1950	501	−18.0%
1961	561	+12.0%
1970	485	−13.5%

Year	Pop.	±%
1980	369	−23.9%
1991	357	−3.3%
2001	341	−4.5%
2011	288	−15.5%
2021	266	−7.6%

Source: Censuses

== Transport ==
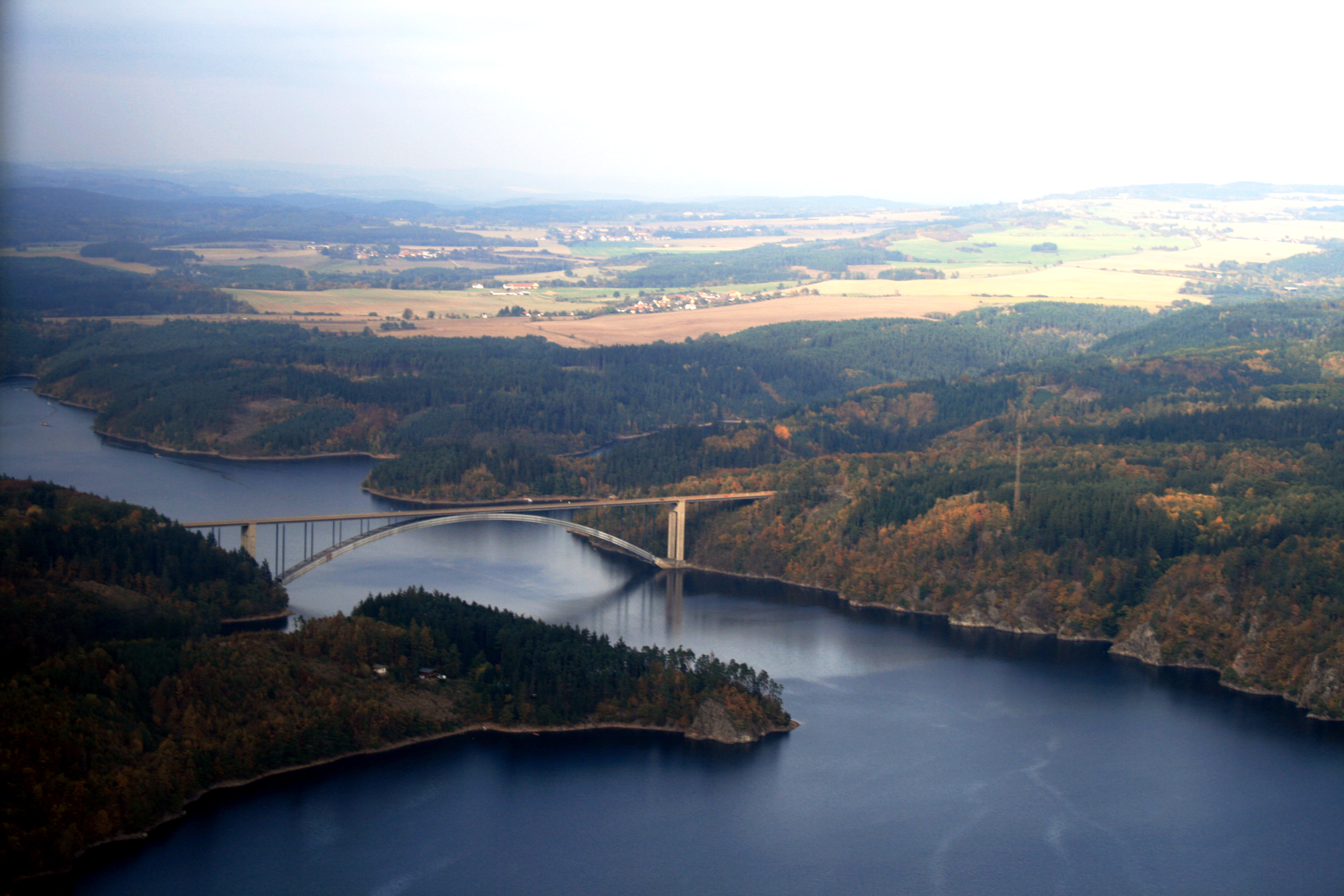
Žďákov Bridge

The I/19 road (the section from Plzeň to Tábor) runs through the municipality. Over the Orlík Reservoir, the road leads via the Žďákov Bridge.

== Sights ==
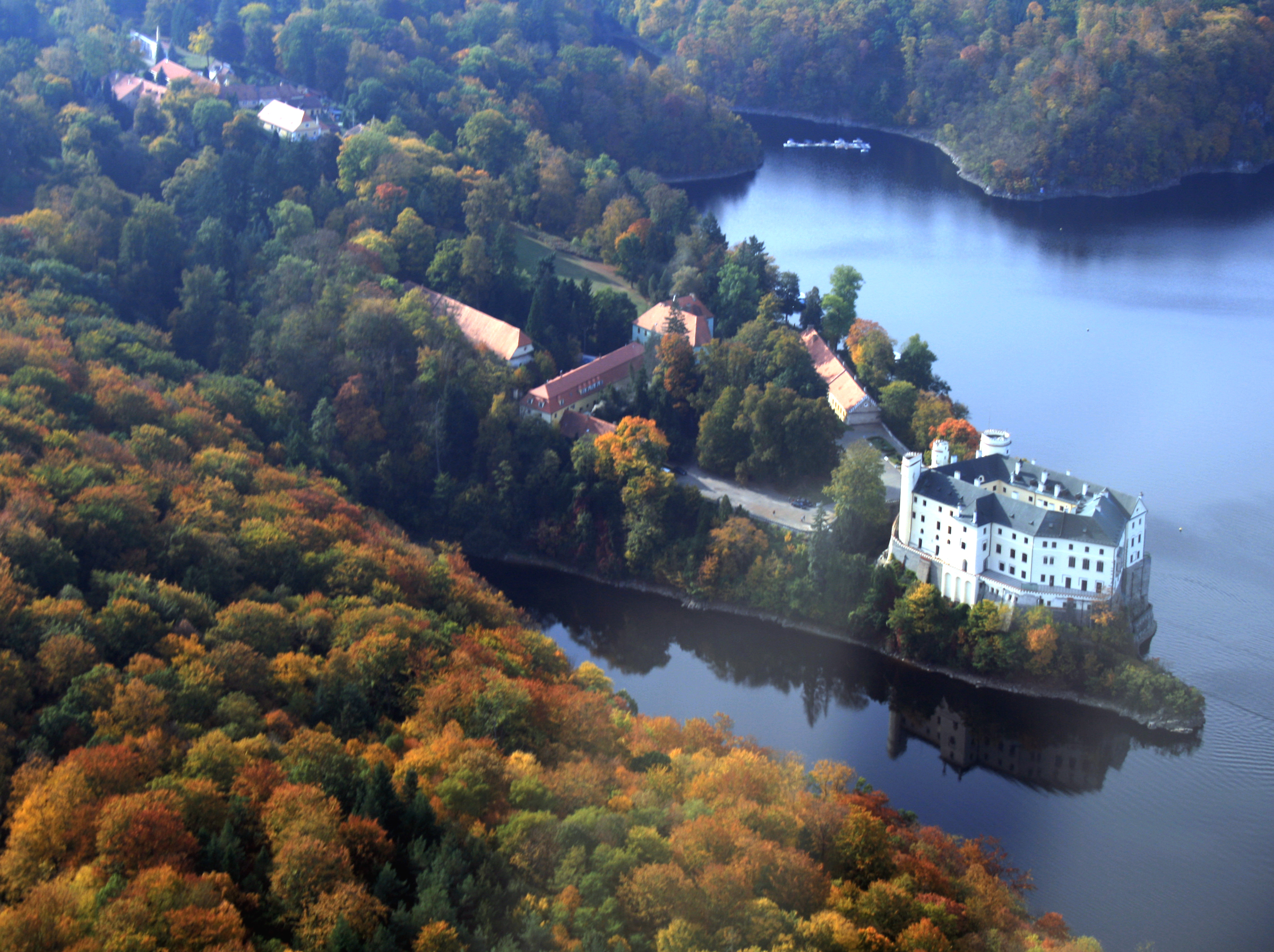
Orlík Castle on the shore of the Orlík Reservoir

Orlík nad Vltavou is known for the Orlík Castle. It was originally a fortress dating from the early 13th century at the latest, which was expanded into a strong Gothic castle. Nowadays, the castle once again belongs to the Schwarzenbergs. It is open to the public. Next to the castle is the castle park. Of the park's original area of 180 ha, 140 ha (350 acres) have been preserved; the rest was flooded during the construction of the reservoir in the 1960s. The castle park includes the Schwarzenberg family tomb from the mid-19th century. For its value, the castle complex is protected as a national cultural monument.

== Notable people ==
- Jan Bedřich Kittl (1806–1868), composer
- Jos Divis (1885–1967), New Zealand miner and photographer

== See also ==
- Orlík killers
