= Albert Traeger =

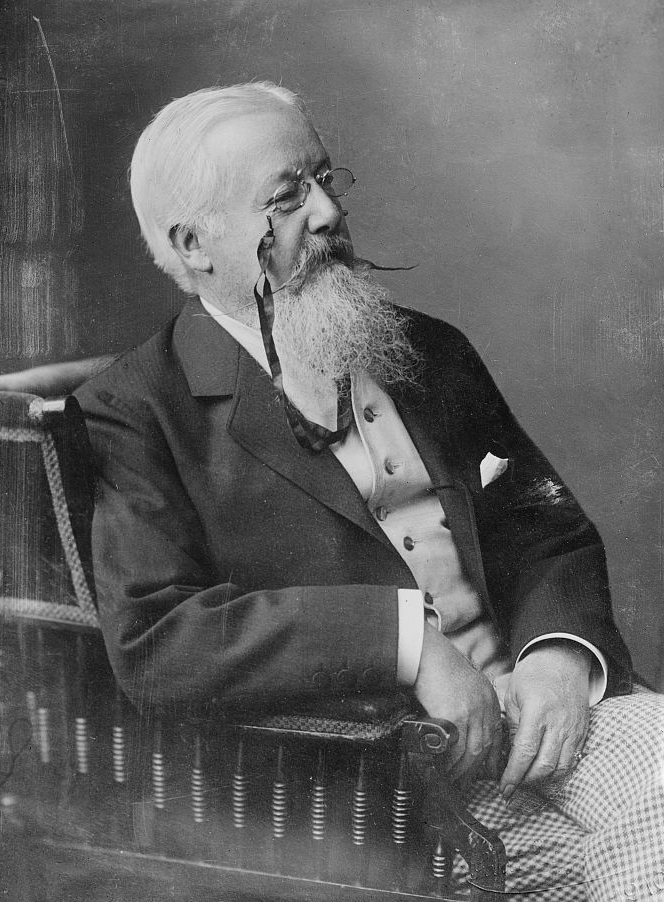

Christian Gottfried Albert Traeger (12 June 1830 in Augsburg, Germany – 26 March 1912 in Charlottenburg) was a German privy councillor and parliamentarian of the Progressive People's Party and writer. German composer Amalie Scholl used his text for her song, “Einst wirst du schlummern.”
