= Kostelec nad Vltavou =

- Municipality
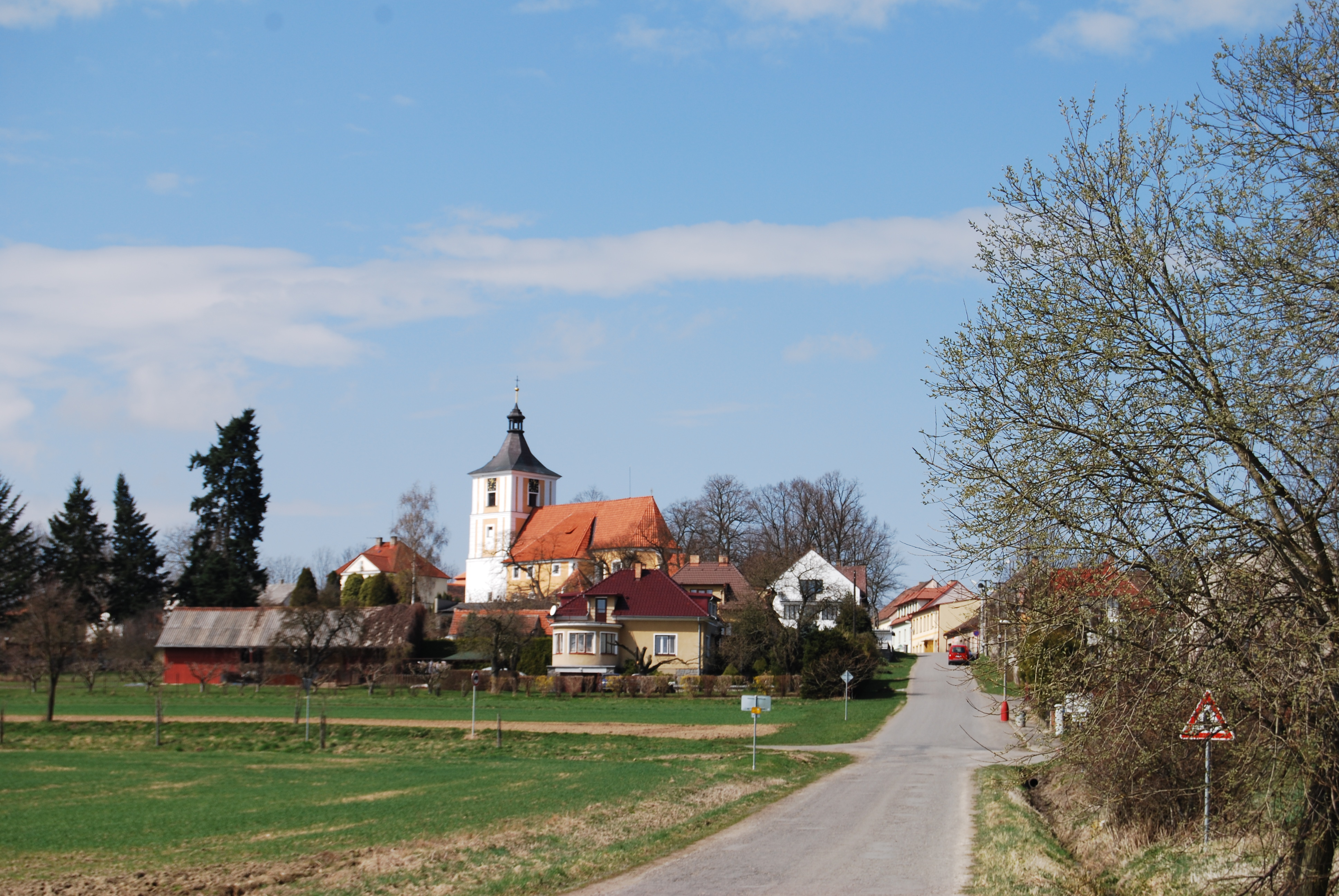
- Entrance to Kostelec nad Vltavou

- Flag Coat of arms

- Location in the Czech Republic
- Coordinates: 49°30′0″N 14°12′42″E
- Country: Czech Republic
- Region: South Bohemian
- District: Písek
- First mentioned: 1318

Area
  - Total: 32.81 km^{2} (12.67 sq mi)
- Elevation: 457 m (1,499 ft)

Population (2026-01-01)
  - Total: 392
  - Density: 11.9/km^{2} (30.9/sq mi)
- Time zone: UTC+1 (CET)
  - Summer (DST): UTC+2 (CEST)
- Postal code: 398 58
- Website: www.kostelecnadvltavou.cz

Kostelec nad Vltavou is a municipality and village in Písek District in the South Bohemian Region of the Czech Republic. It has about 400 inhabitants.

Kostelec nad Vltavou lies approximately 23 kilometres (14 mi) north of Písek, 62 km (39 mi) north of České Budějovice, and 67 km (42 mi) south of Prague.

== Administrative division ==
Kostelec nad Vltavou consists of five municipal parts (in brackets population according to the 2021 census):

- Kostelec nad Vltavou (208)
- Přílepov (55)
- Sobědraž (77)
- Zahrádka (49)

== Demographics ==
Historical population
Year	Pop.	±%
1869	1,557	—
1880	1,439	−7.6%
1890	1,373	−4.6%
1900	1,227	−10.6%
1910	1,246	+1.5%
1921	1,220	−2.1%
1930	1,124	−7.9%
1950	838	−25.4%
1961	761	−9.2%
1970	721	−5.3%
1980	579	−19.7%
1991	461	−20.4%
2001	414	−10.2%
2011	400	−3.4%
2021	389	−2.7%
Source: Censuses
