= Otava (river) =

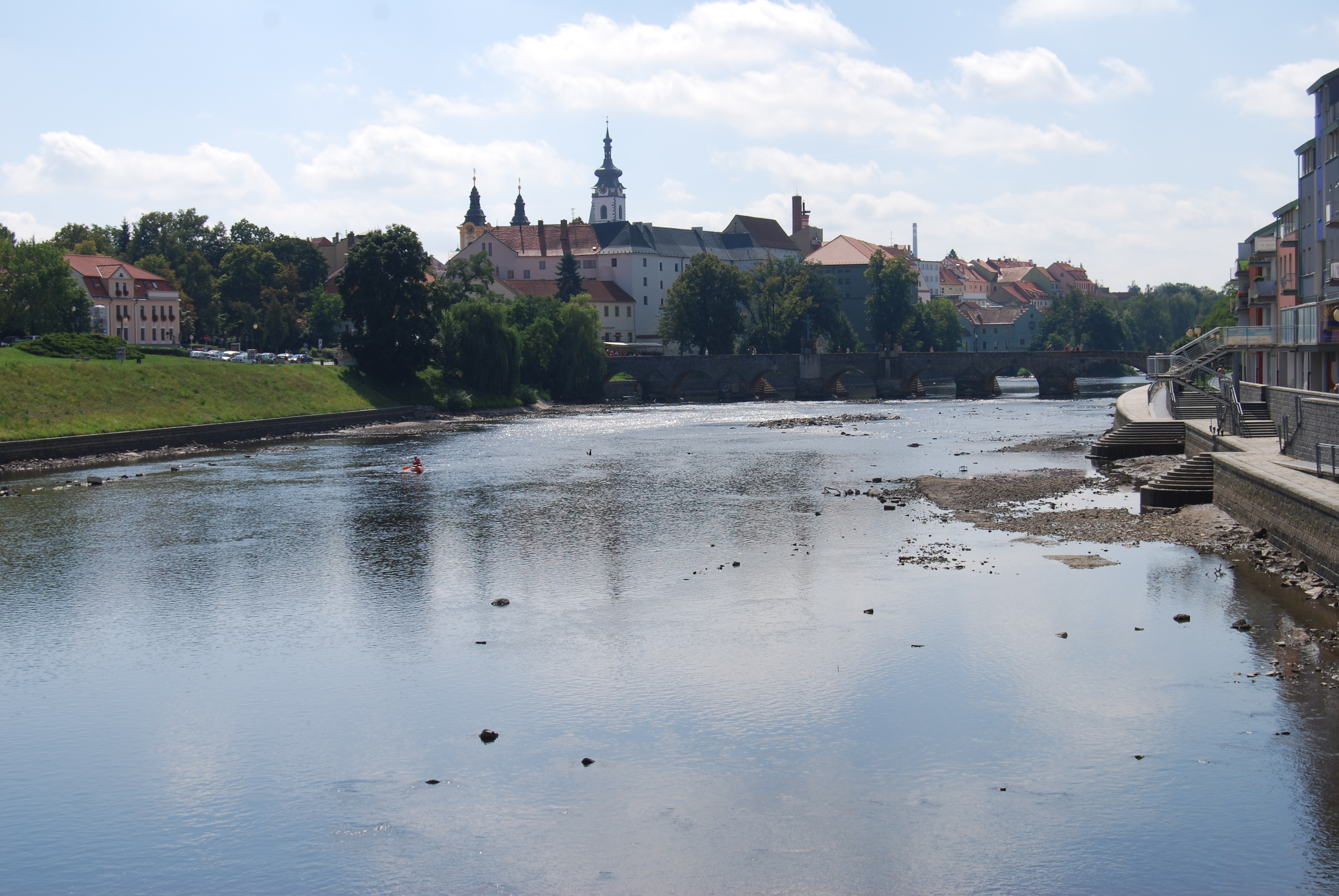
- The Otava in Písek

Location
- Countries: Czech Republic
- Regions: Plzeň; South Bohemian

Physical characteristics
- Source: Vydra
  - location: Modrava, Bohemian Forest
  - coordinates: 48°56′29″N 13°29′47″E
  - elevation: 975 m (3,199 ft)
- Mouth
  - location: Vltava
  - coordinates: 49°1′30″N 13°29′47″E
  - elevation: 348 m (1,142 ft)
- Length: 134.8 km (83.8 mi)
- Basin size: 3,826.9 km^{2} (1,477.6 sq mi)
- Discharge
  - average: 26.0 m^{3}/s (920 cu ft/s) near estuary

Basin features
- Progression: Vltava→ Elbe→ North Sea

The Otava (Czech pronunciation: [ˈotava]; German: Wottawa) is a river in the Czech Republic, a left tributary of the Vltava River. It flows through the Plzeň and South Bohemian regions. It is formed by the confluence of the Vydra and Křemelná rivers. Together with the Vydra, which is its main source, the Otava is 134.8 km (83.8 mi) long, making it the 13th longest river in the country. Without the Vydra, it is 111.7 km (69.4 mi) long.

== Etymology ==
The origin of the name is unclear. The Czech word otava means 'second harvest of grass', but the name of the river is probably of pre-Slavic origin and the resemblance to this Czech word is only coincidental. A possible but unproven origin is the Germanic word Vatahva, meaning 'quick water'. According to one theory, the name of the river is derived from the Celtic words áth a ava, which meant 'river with many fords'.

== Characteristic ==
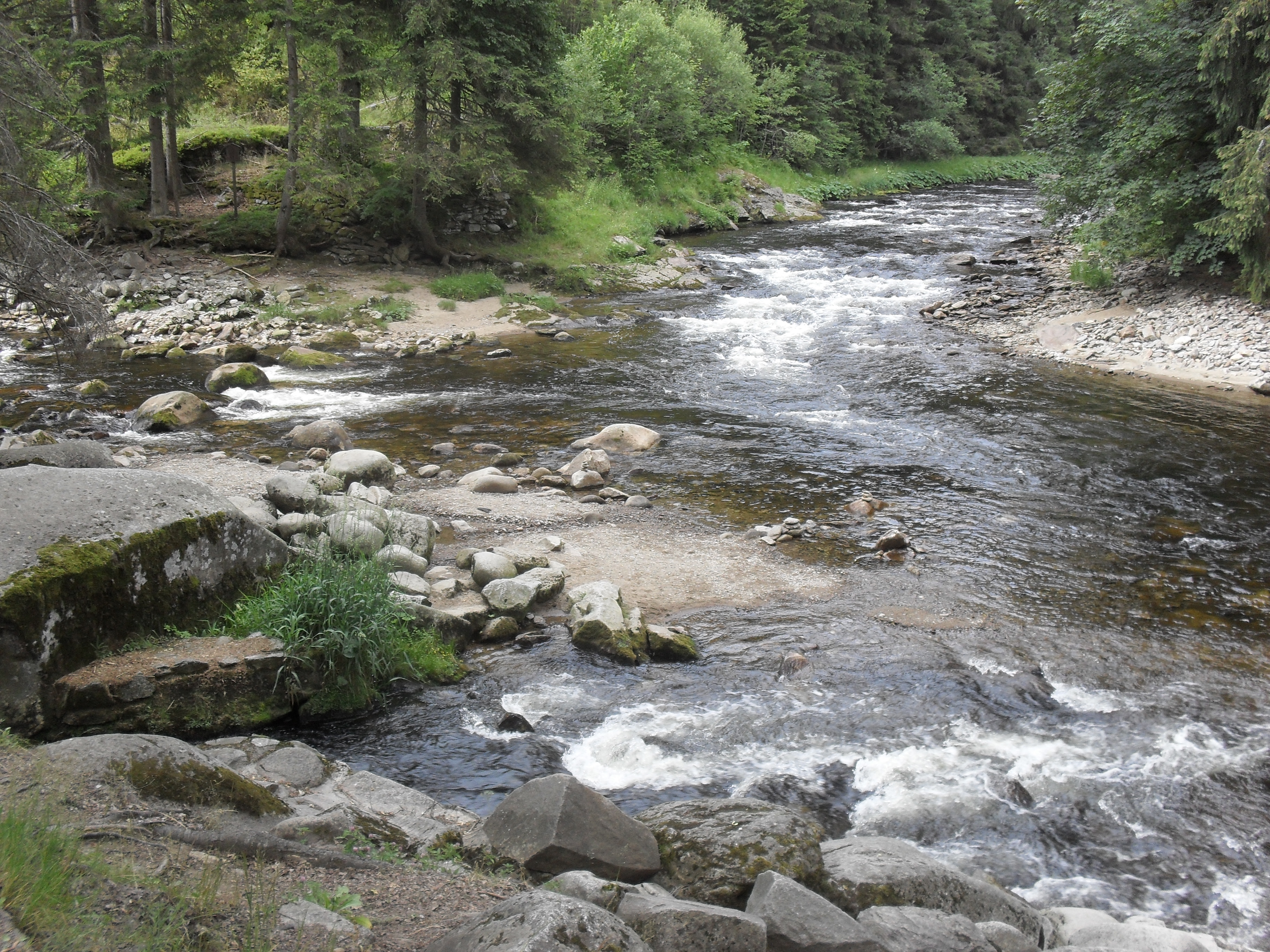
Confluence of the Vydra and Křemelná rivers, forming the Otava

From a water management point of view, the Otava and Vydra are two different rivers with separate numbering of river kilometres. The Otava itself is formed by the confluence of the Vydra and Křemelná in the territory of Hartmanice, and is 111.7 km (69.4 mi) long. In a broader point of view, the Otava (as Vydra) arises in the territory of Modrava in the Bohemian Forest at 975 m (3,199 ft) and flows to Zvíkovské Podhradí, where it enters the Vltava River at an elevation of 348 m (1,142 ft). It is 134.8 km (83.8 mi) long, making it the 13th longest river in the country. Its drainage basin has an area of 3,826.9 km^{2} (1,477.6 sq mi).

The Otava has many relatively significant tributaries, the following being the longest ones:

Tributary	Length (km)	River km	Side
Blanice	94.7	32.8	right
Lomnice	59.3	24.9	left
Volyňka	46.1	54.6	right
Ostružná	41.2	88.9	left
Křemelná	32.9	111.7	left
Brložský potok	27.6	35.5	left
Vydra	23.7	111.7	–
Novosedelský potok	23.5	60.5	right
Březový potok	21.7	62.9	left
Volšovka	19.6	94.5	left

== Course ==
The largest settlements on the river are the towns of Písek and Strakonice. The river flows through the municipal territories of Hartmanice, Rejštejn, Dlouhá Ves, Sušice, Dobršín, Rabí, Žichovice, Velké Hydčice, Malý Bor, Horažďovice, Střelské Hoštice, Horní Poříčí, Katovice, Strakonice, Slaník, Přešťovice, Štěkeň, Čejetice, Putim, Kestřany, Písek, Čížová, Vrcovice, Vojníkov, Vráž, Ostrovec, Oslov, Varvažov and Zvíkovské Podhradí.

== Bodies of water ==
The drainage basin is rich in fishponds, especially in the area of the České Budějovice Basin. There are 4,768 bodies of water in the basin area; the largest of them is the Labuť pond with an area of 101 ha (250 acres), built on the stream of Kostratecký potok. In the area of the confluence of the Vltava and the Otava, the extensive Orlík Reservoir is built on the Vltava, which also extends into the lower course of the Otava. Apart from this reservoir, no other reservoir or pond is built directly on the river.

== History ==
In earlier times, the banks of the Otava were popular for gold panning. It is still possible to find flakes of gold here. The sand panned for gold also gave the name to the town of Písek (literally 'sand').

== Tourism ==
The Otava is suitable for river tourism. The course of the river is lined with many campsites for tourists and paddlers.
