= Prácheňsko =

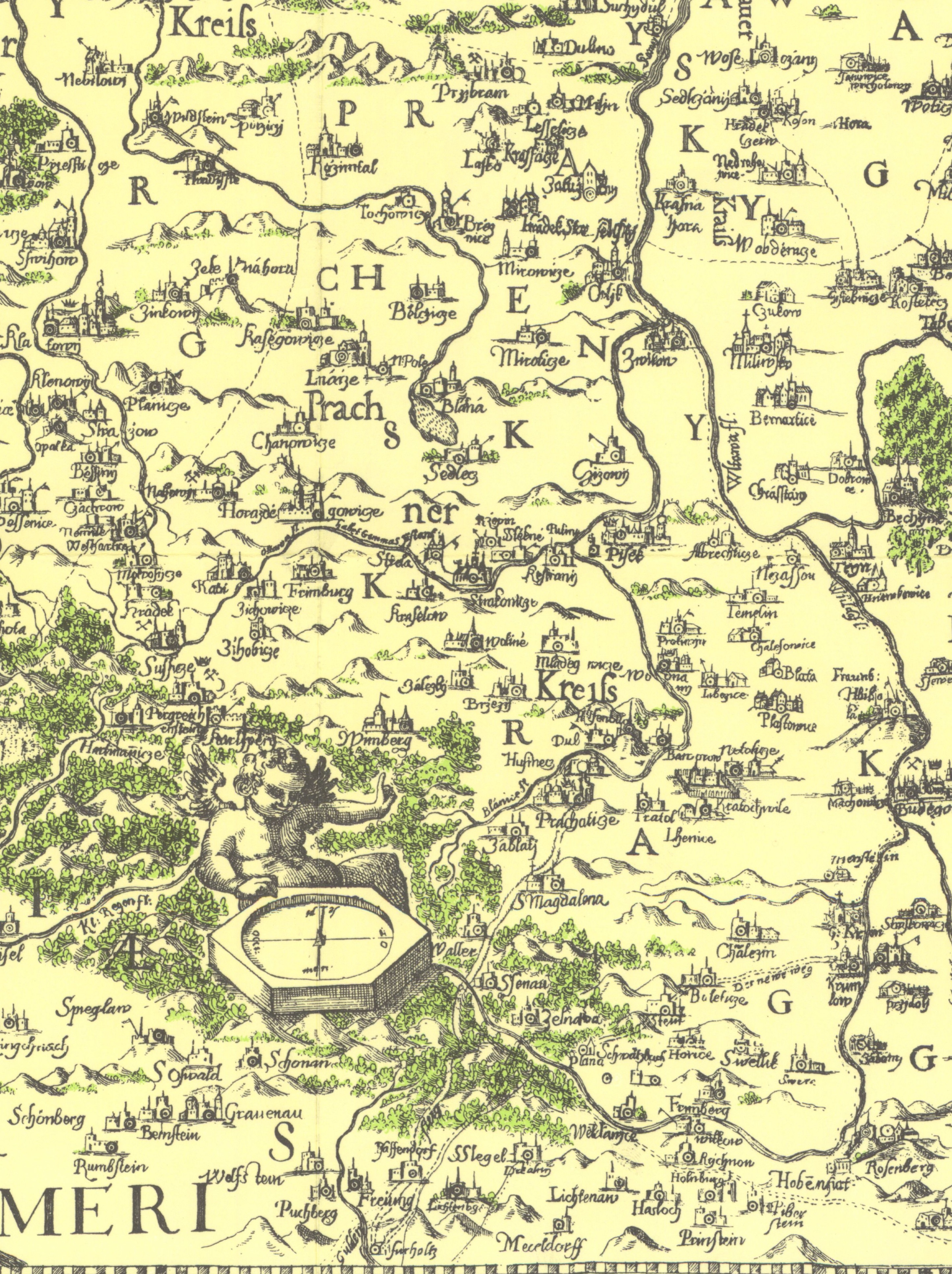
The oldest depiction of the Prácheňsko region on the Pavel Aretin's map of Bohemian Kingdom (Regni Bohemiae nova et exacta descriptio, 1619)

Prácheňsko (German: Prachens; Latin: Provincia Prachinensis) is a historical and cultural region in the Czech Republic, covering roughly the Otava River basin, mostly in the northwest part of South Bohemia. It was an administrative region in southwestern Bohemia, created in the late 13th century and abolished by the Austrian Empire's regional reform of 1848.

== Description ==
Its boundaries extended through the Bohemian Forest in the south, towards České Budějovice to the north, close to the town of Příbram, and southwest to Železná Ruda. Ethnic groups of the region included Czechs, Germans, Jews and Romani, and by religion were Roman Catholics, Protestants (Utraquists) and Jews. Today this area is divided among three current regions, namely South Bohemian (vast majority), Plzeň and Central Bohemian. Its capital was Písek, now a major town of approximately 30,000 inhabitants.

The first region's centre, Prácheň gord (which gave its name to the whole region), is now overtaken by forest. Its remains lie in the territory of Velké Hydčice close to the town of Horažďovice. The local dialect of the western part is still extant as is the use of the bagpipe in the music of the region. The main geographical feature of the Prácheňsko region is the river Otava. Principal towns of the former Prácheňsko were Písek (or Pisek in German), Strakonice (Strakonitz), Sušice (Schüttenhofen), Rožmitál (Rosenthal), Vimperk (Winterberg), Horní Planá (Ober Plan), Železná Ruda (Markt Eisenstein), Kasejovice (Kassejowitz), Protivín (Protiwin) and Horažďovice (Horaschdowitz).

== History ==
Prácheňsko existed as an administrative unit (region) from the 13th century (at the beginning of the 15th century it was also called the Sušice Region due to the existence of the court in Sušice) until the reform of the regional organization in 1849–1850, when it was divided between the Budějovice and Plzeň Regions. In 1855, it was briefly restored as the Písek Region, but in 1862, with the abolition of the regions, it ceased to exist as an administrative unit permanentl Later administrative reforms in 1920, 1949, 1960 and 2000 confirmed the division of the historic Prácheň region between the Budějovice (or South Bohemian) and Plzeň (or West Bohemian) regions.

== Demographics ==
The current population of the region is approximately 200,000–250,000 inhabitants. The area suffered serious population losses because of the expulsion of Germans after World War II (about 25% of the population, mostly in the southern part) and because of the Holocaust. Today the Jewish population is negligible and there is no active synagogue.

A unique dialect of the Czech language with a large number of German loan words is spoken in the western part of the region.
