= Držov =

- Village
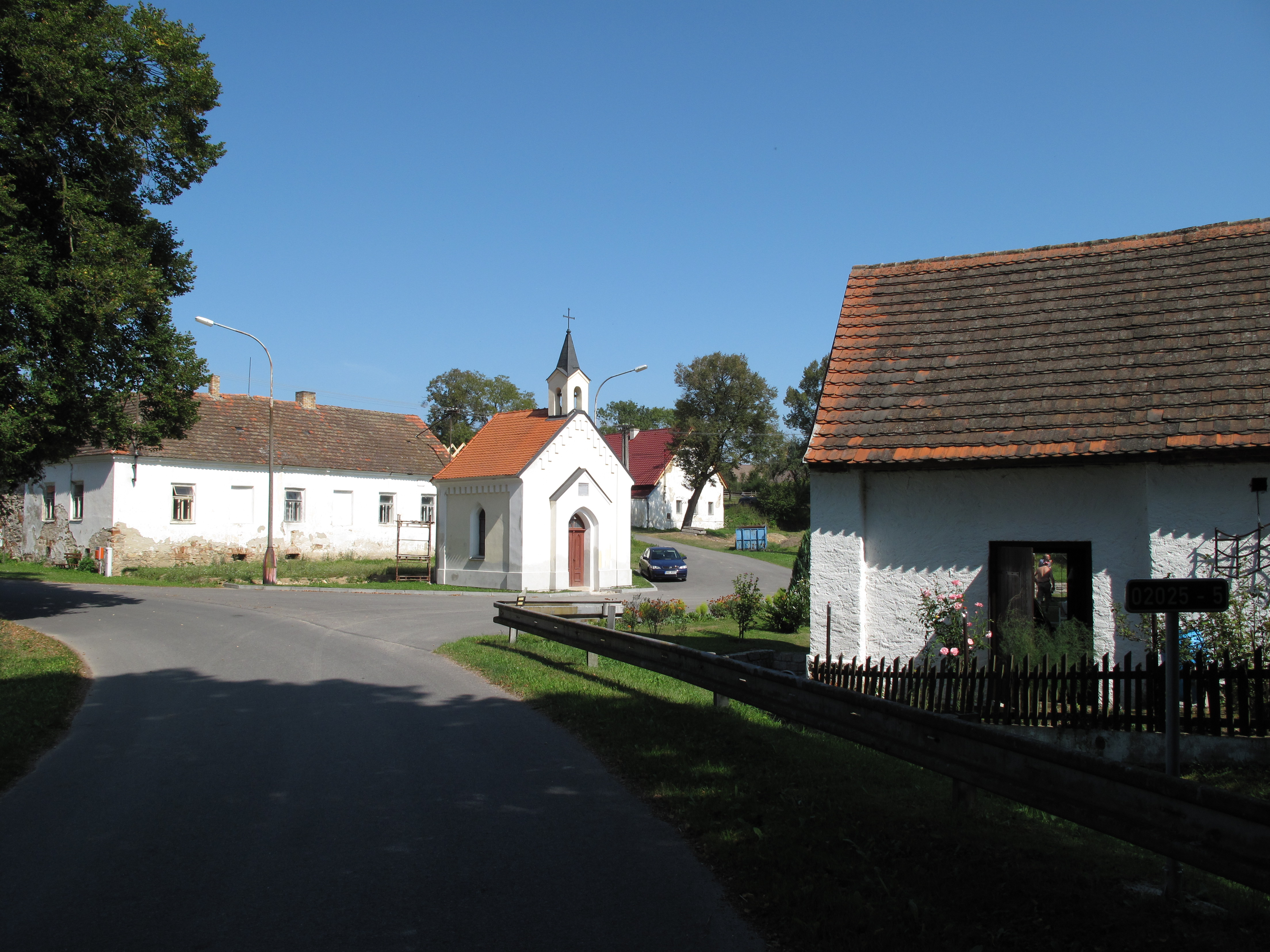
- Držov, village square

- Location in the Czech Republic
- Coordinates: 49°21′13″N 14°10′37″E
- Country: Czech Republic
- Region: South Bohemian
- District: Písek
- Municipality: Vojníkov

Area
  - Total: 11.79 km^{2} (4.55 sq mi)
- Elevation: 425 m (1,394 ft)

Population (2005)
  - Total: 62
  - Density: 5.3/km^{2} (14/sq mi)
- Time zone: UTC+1 (CET)
  - Summer (DST): UTC+2 (CEST)
- Postal code: 398 18

Držov is a village in Písek District, Czech Republic. It is a part of Vojníkov municipality, being situated between Vojníkov and Louka.
