= Zvíkov Castle =

Castle in the Czech Republic

Zvíkov
- hrad Zvíkov
- Zvíkovské Podhradí, South Bohemian Region, Near Písek in the Czech Republic
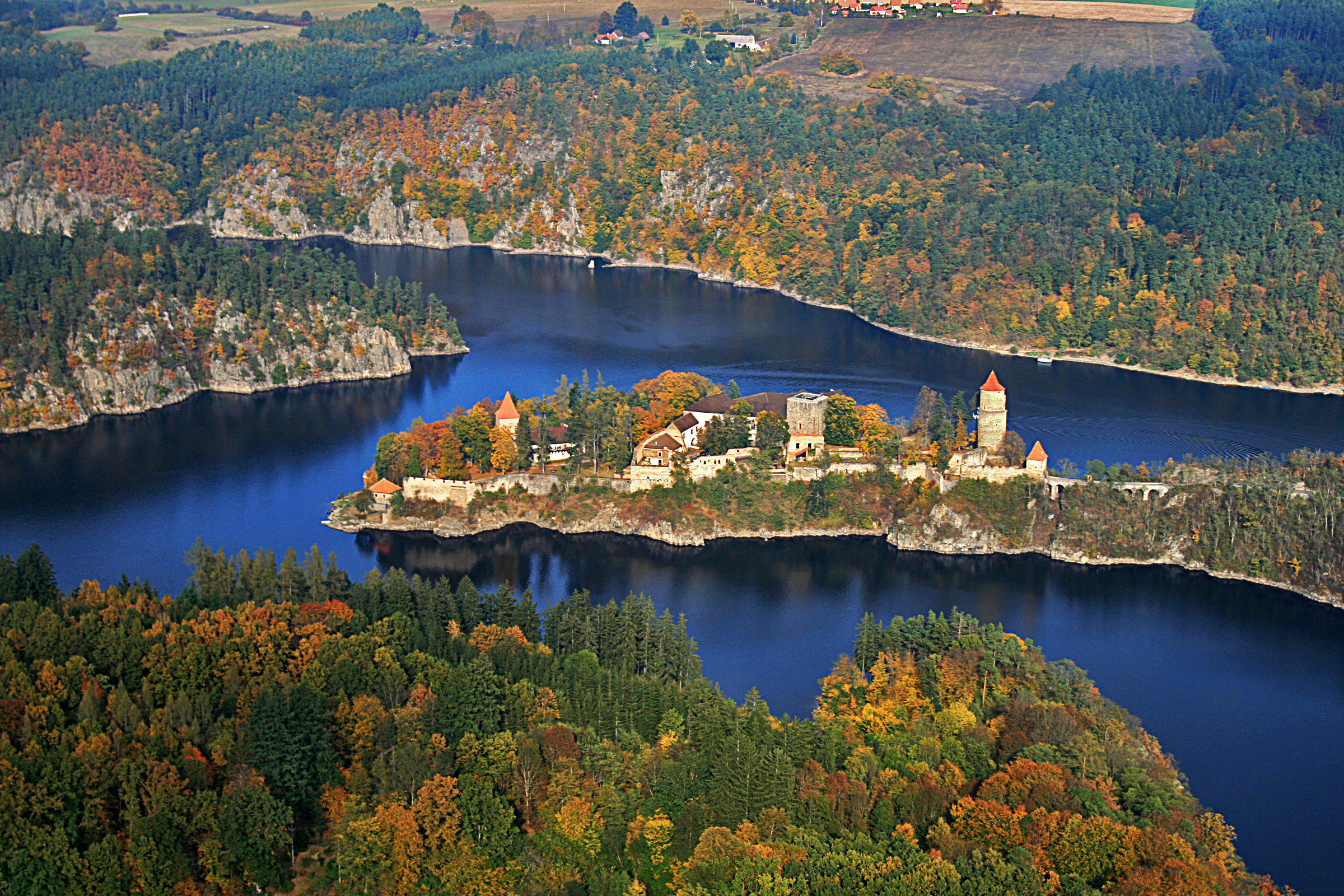
- Aerial view of Zvíkov Castle

Site information
- Type: Castle
- Website: www.hrad-zvikov.cz/en

Location
- Location in the Czech Republic
- Coordinates: 49°26.22′N 14°11.31′E

Site history
- Built: Before 1234

Zvíkov (Czech: hrad Zvíkov; German: Klingenberg), often called "the king of Czech castles", is a castle in Zvíkovské Podhradí municipality, about 15 kilometres (9 mi) north of Písek in the South Bohemian Region of the Czech Republic. It stands on a difficult-to-access and steep promontory above the confluence of the Vltava and Otava rivers. The castle is one of the most important early-Gothic castles in Czech lands.

The area was inhabited as early as prehistoric times, when the Celts built a fort here in the 1st century AD. The current castle was built in the first half of the 13th century, most probably on the orders of King Ottokar I, but the exact date is not known. The first written mention of the castle comes from year 1234 and owned by the Kings of Bohemia.

== History ==
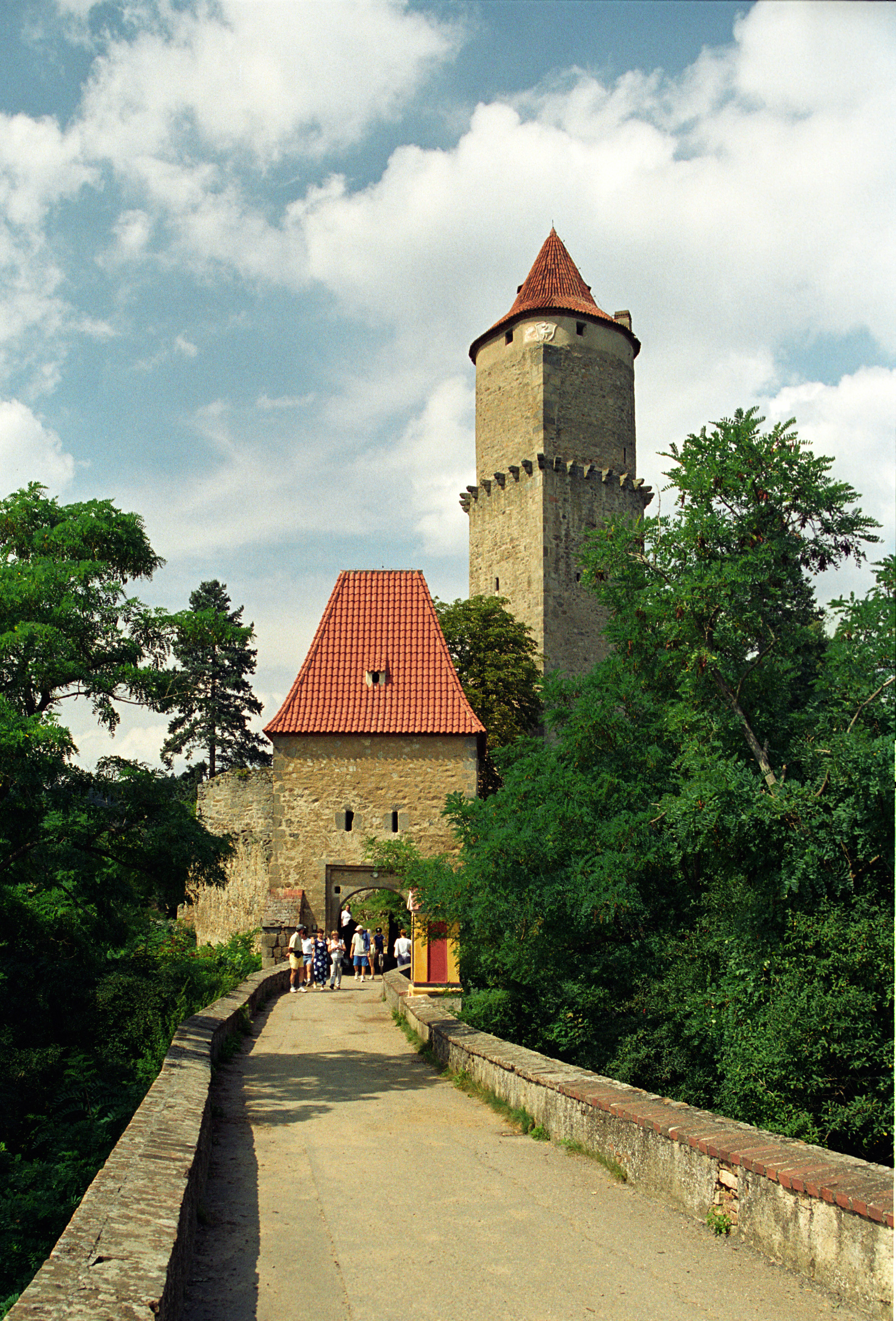
Zvíkov gatehouse and tower

Originally a small complex, the castle was continuously extended until 1278. After the Přemyslid dynasty died out in 1306, Zvíkov became property of the Rosenberg family. After 1337 the settlement under the castle has been fortified, as a part of thorough repairs. Its fortifications were so strong that even the Hussites, during the Hussite Wars, besieged it for four months in 1429, but found it a tough nut to crack and failed to take it. To protect against heavy artillery its walls were further strengthened.

Although Emperor Charles IV placed it on a list of royal castles not to be pawned, his successors ignored his decree and by 1431 it was in the possession of the Rosenberg family. At the start of Thirty Years' War Zvíkov was owned by a rebellious Protestant nobleman whose garrison of 140 men successfully defended the castle against 4,000 Habsburg troops in 1618. The defendants agreed to capitulate to the Emperor's forces only in October 1622. Subsequently, it was looted and devastated. During the 1640s the Schwambergs modified the palace and extended it in Renaissance style.

After the damage inflicted by the war, Zvíkov was restored, but its glory was long gone and the castle served only for farming purposes. A fire accelerated the deterioration of its buildings in 1751. Thus a once-important seat of Czech kings it had become an almost ruin by the 1840s, at which time the Schwarzenbergs, owners of the ruin, invested huge sums in a thorough reconstruction, which restored the heart of the castle to its former glory.

At the end of 17th century it ceased to have military value and was used as granary. The decline continued and in 1751 fire damaged a large part of the palace. In 1780 the chapel was deconsecrated. The facade of the palace collapsed in 1829 and between 1880 and 1902 the castle was reconstructed, only to be confiscated by the state in 1947.

The Orlík Dam, which was built between 1954 and 1962 and named after Orlík Castle, deluged the castle downtown and made Zvíkov easily accessible. Major restorations between 1970 and 1980 concentrated on the palace.

== Description ==
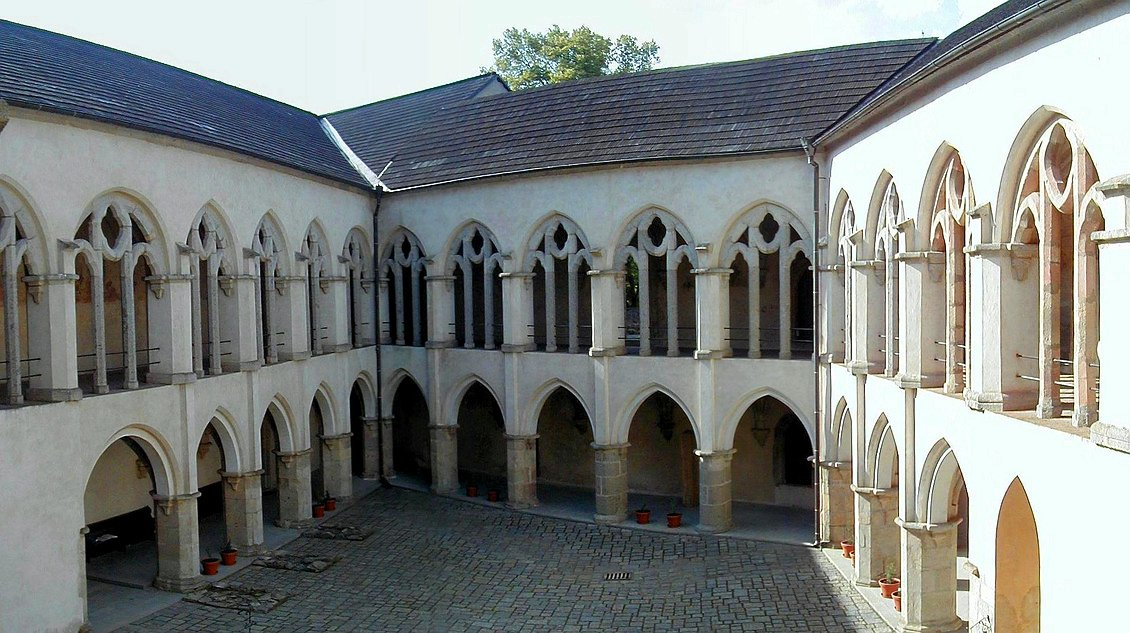
Courtyard of Zvíkov Castle

The oldest part of Zvíkov is a massive prismatic residential tower named Hlízová with palace buildings built on its sides. During the reign of Ottokar II of Bohemia, a palace named Královský ("King's Own") was built and this ground plan has been preserved until today. The new palace was built in lavish style and its parts were connected by monumental arcade.

After 1473, Bohuslav of Schwamberg commissioned mural decorations in the Chapel of St. Wenceslaus, which belongs to the masterpieces of early-gothic Czech architecture. The walls display the patron saints of Bohemia, the Virgin Mary the Protector, the Suffering Christ and the Martyrdom of St. Erasmus. The fortification was extended with Hláska, large 32-metre (105 ft) high tower (bergfrit) on the south side. The castle has two gates.

The castle has its own ghost, Zvíkov's imp, and had inspired several painters and writers like the theatrical comedy Zvíkovský rarášek by Ladislav Stroupežnický. Today, Zvíkov (opened from Spring to Autumn) is hiking attraction and serves as a place of art exhibitions and stage plays.

== See also ==
- Orlík Castle
