= Střelské Hoštice =

- Municipality
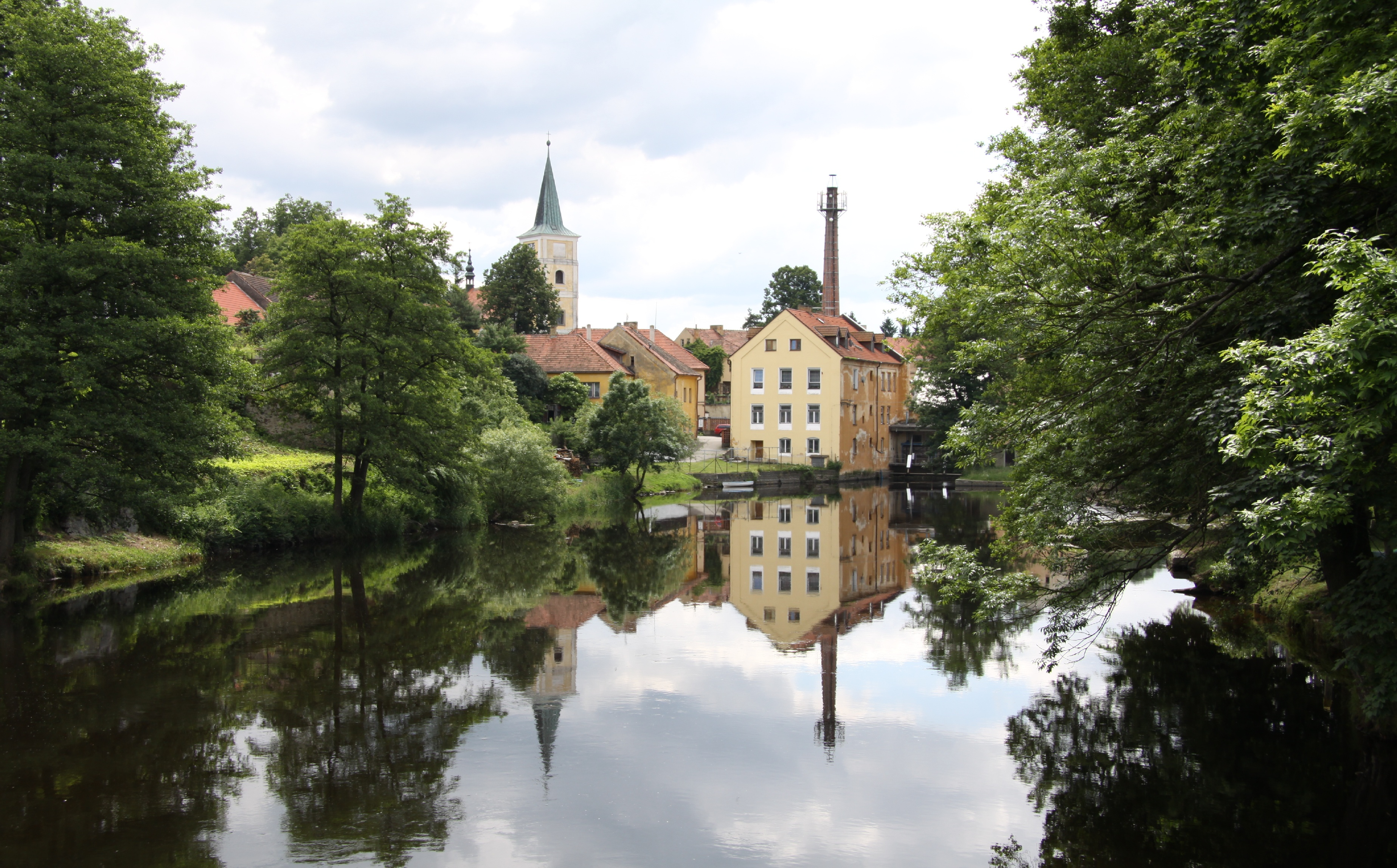
- Otava River in Střelské Hoštice

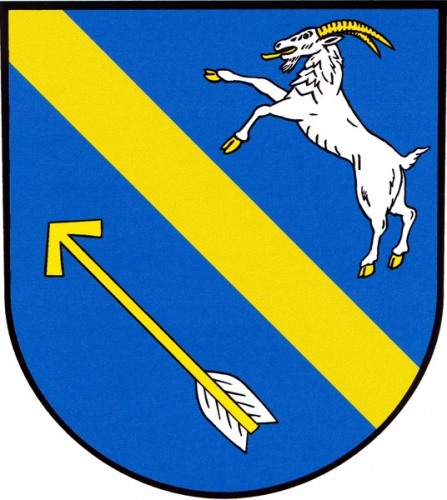
- Flag Coat of arms

- Location in the Czech Republic
- Coordinates: 49°17′52″N 13°45′22″E
- Country: Czech Republic
- Region: South Bohemian
- District: Strakonice
- First mentioned: 1320

Area
  - Total: 20.84 km^{2} (8.05 sq mi)
- Elevation: 415 m (1,362 ft)

Population (2026-01-01)
  - Total: 907
  - Density: 43.5/km^{2} (113/sq mi)
- Time zone: UTC+1 (CET)
  - Summer (DST): UTC+2 (CEST)
- Postal code: 387 15
- Website: www.strelskehostice.cz

Střelské Hoštice is a municipality and village in Strakonice District in the South Bohemian Region of the Czech Republic. It has about 900 inhabitants.

Střelské Hoštice lies approximately 12 kilometres (7 mi) west of Strakonice, 64 km (40 mi) northwest of České Budějovice, and 100 km (62 mi) southwest of Prague.

== Administrative division ==
Střelské Hoštice consists of four municipal parts (in brackets population according to the 2021 census):

- Střelské Hoštice (631)
- Kozlov (119)
- Sedlo (56)
- Střelskohoštická Lhota (81)

== Demographics ==
Historical population
Year	Pop.	±%
1869	1,818	—
1880	1,922	+5.7%
1890	1,747	−9.1%
1900	1,678	−3.9%
1910	1,612	−3.9%
1921	1,572	−2.5%
1930	1,450	−7.8%
1950	1,156	−20.3%
1961	1,206	+4.3%
1970	1,077	−10.7%
1980	973	−9.7%
1991	880	−9.6%
2001	892	+1.4%
2011	860	−3.6%
2021	887	+3.1%
Source: Censuses
