= Zvíkovské Podhradí =

- Municipality
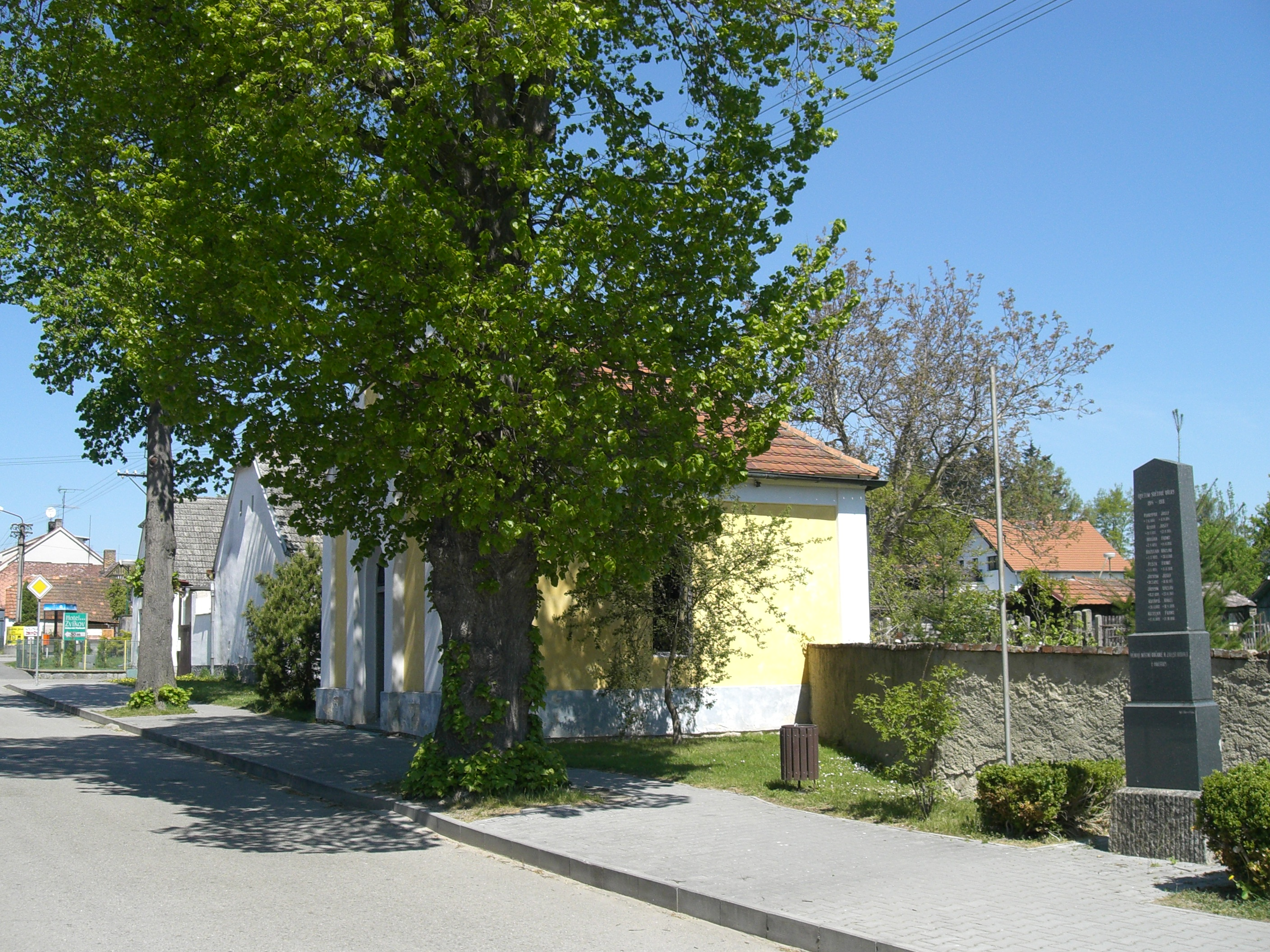
- Main street

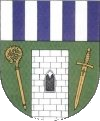
- Flag Coat of arms

- Location in the Czech Republic
- Coordinates: 49°25′36″N 14°12′2″E
- Country: Czech Republic
- Region: South Bohemian
- District: Písek
- First mentioned: 1547

Area
  - Total: 4.37 km^{2} (1.69 sq mi)
- Elevation: 402 m (1,319 ft)

Population (2026-01-01)
  - Total: 204
  - Density: 46.7/km^{2} (121/sq mi)
- Time zone: UTC+1 (CET)
  - Summer (DST): UTC+2 (CEST)
- Postal code: 398 18
- Website: www.zvikovskepodhradi.cz

Zvíkovské Podhradí is a municipality and village in Písek District in the South Bohemian Region of the Czech Republic. It has about 200 inhabitants. The municipality is known for the Zvíkov Castle, which is protected as a national cultural monument.

== Etymology ==
The initial name of the settlement was just Podhradí, meaning 'area below the castle' in Czech. In 1924, it was renamed Zvíkovské Podhradí ('Zvíkov's area below the castle').

== Geography ==
Zvíkovské Podhradí is located about 13 kilometres (8 mi) north of Písek and 53 km (33 mi) north of České Budějovice. It lies in the Tábor Uplands. The highest point is at 416 m (1,365 ft) above sea level. The municipality is situated at the confluence of the rivers Vltava and Otava, on the shores of the Orlík Reservoir, which is built on both of these rivers.

== History ==
The Zvíkov Castle was probably founded by King Ottokar I in the first half of the 13th century. After the Přymslid dynasty died out, the Zvíkov Castle and the estate were owned by the noble families of Rosenberg, Švamberk and Eggenberg. From 1719 until 1948, it was owned by the Schwarzenberg family.

The first written mention of the village of Podhradí, located just below the castle, is from 1547. In the early 19th century, the village of Karlov was founded south of the castle and named in honour of Prince Karl Philipp of Schwarzenberg. In the second half of the 19th century, Karlov took on the name Podhradí. In the 1960s, the original settlement of Podhradí was flooded during the construction of the Orlík Reservoir.

== Demographics ==
Historical population

Year	Pop.	±%
1869	273	—
1880	298	+9.2%
1890	224	−24.8%
1900	206	−8.0%
1910	176	−14.6%

Year	Pop.	±%
1921	173	−1.7%
1930	127	−26.6%
1950	124	−2.4%
1961	161	+29.8%
1970	158	−1.9%

Year	Pop.	±%
1980	176	+11.4%
1991	183	+4.0%
2001	187	+2.2%
2011	201	+7.5%
2021	199	−1.0%

Source: Censuses

== Transport ==
There are no railways or major roads passing through the municipality.

== Sights ==
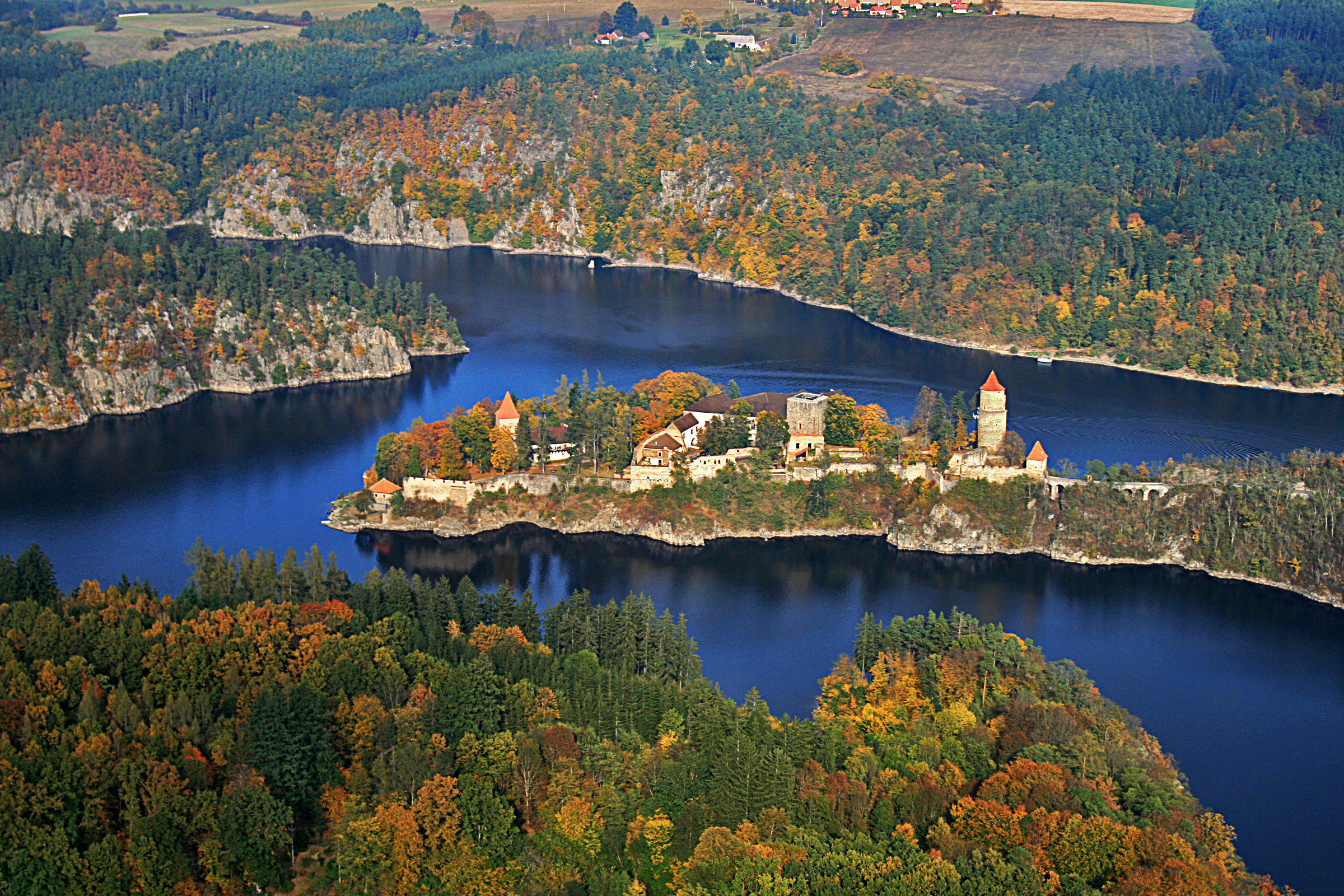
Zvíkov Castle and the confluence of Vltava and Otava

Zvíkovské Podhradí is known for the Zvíkov Castle. This medieval castle was rebuilt in the 1540s and 1550s and acquired the standards of Renaissance castles. In the mid-18th century, it ceased to be maintained and in the first half of the 19th century it was already a ruin. The Schwarzenberg family, however, undertook gradual reconstructions, which were completed at the turn of the 19th and 20th centuries. The castle is protected as a national cultural monument. Today the castle is owned by the state, is open to the public and offers guided tours.

The main landmark of the centre of the village is a chapel from the third quarter of the 19th century.
