= Štěkeň =

- Market town
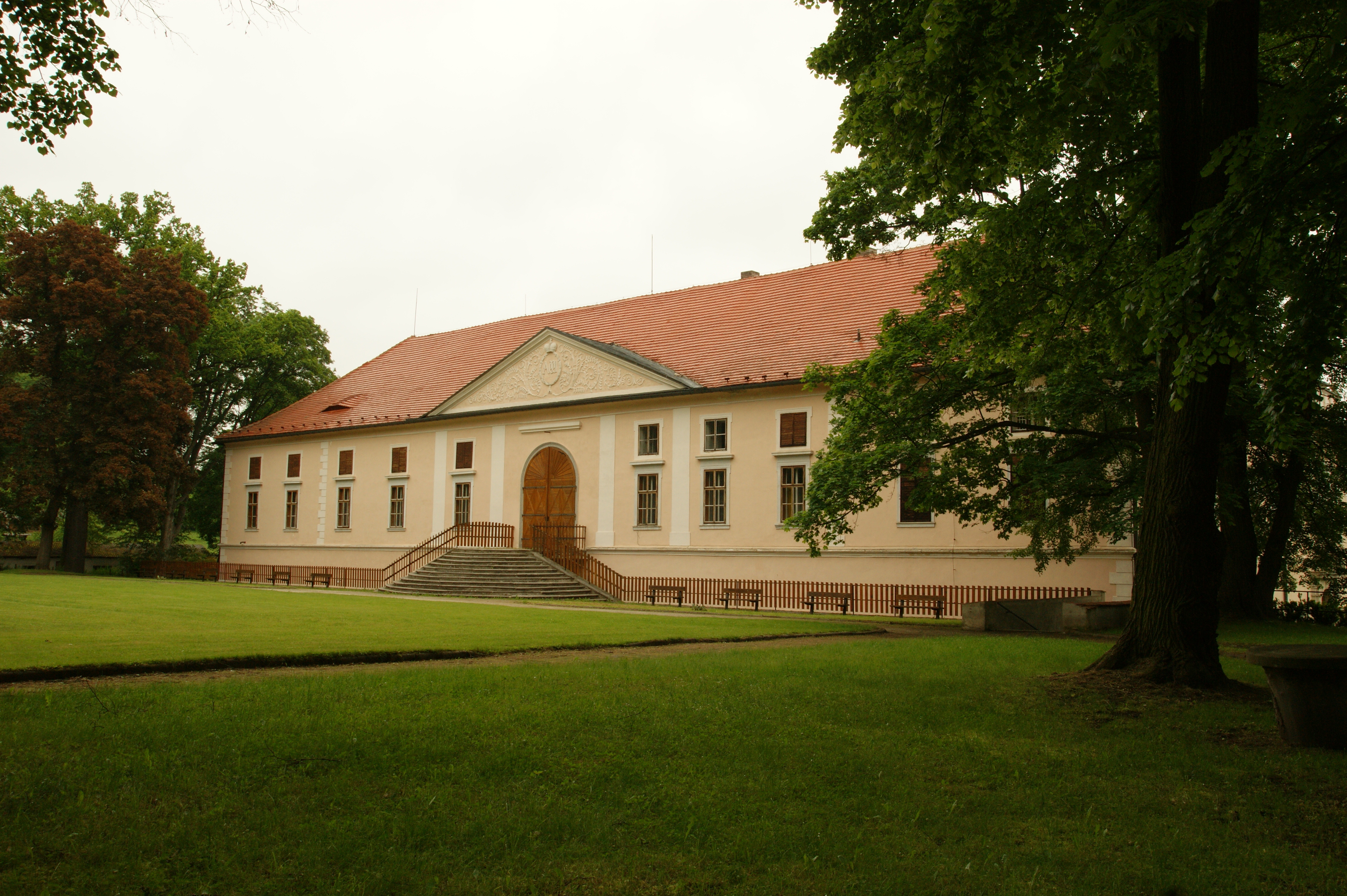
- Štěkeň Castle

- Flag Coat of arms

- Location in the Czech Republic
- Coordinates: 49°16′2″N 14°0′21″E
- Country: Czech Republic
- Region: South Bohemian
- District: Strakonice
- First mentioned: 1318

Area
  - Total: 14.47 km^{2} (5.59 sq mi)
- Elevation: 388 m (1,273 ft)

Population (2026-01-01)
  - Total: 891
  - Density: 61.6/km^{2} (159/sq mi)
- Time zone: UTC+1 (CET)
  - Summer (DST): UTC+2 (CEST)
- Postal code: 387 51
- Website: steken.cz

Štěkeň (Czech pronunciation: [ˈʃcɛkɛɲ]) is a market town in Strakonice District in the South Bohemian Region of the Czech Republic. It has about 900 inhabitants.

== Administrative division ==
Štěkeň consists of three municipal parts (in brackets population according to the 2021 census):

- Štěkeň (657)
- Nové Kestřany (112)
- Vítkov (64)

== Etymology ==
The name is derived from the personal name Štěkna (in Old Czech written as Ščekna), meaning "Štěkna's (court)".

== Geography ==
Štěkeň is located about 7 kilometres (4 mi) east of Strakonice and 46 km (29 mi) northwest of České Budějovice. It lies on the border between the České Budějovice Basin and Blatná Uplands. The highest point is the hill Brdo at 508 m (1,667 ft) above sea level. The municipality is situated on the left bank of the Otava River. The area is rich in fishponds and small streams.

== History ==
The first written mention of Štěkeň is from 1318. It was the centre of a small estate to which four other villages belonged. From 1648 to 1781, Štěkeň was owned by the Losy of Losinthal family, then it was acquired by the Windisch-Graetz family. In 1784, Štěkeň was promoted to a market town.

== Demographics ==
Historical population

Year	Pop.	±%
1869	1,487	—
1880	1,626	+9.3%
1890	1,400	−13.9%
1900	1,411	+0.8%
1910	1,348	−4.5%

Year	Pop.	±%
1921	1,354	+0.4%
1930	1,371	+1.3%
1950	1,104	−19.5%
1961	1,219	+10.4%
1970	1,129	−7.4%

Year	Pop.	±%
1980	1,078	−4.5%
1991	916	−15.0%
2001	891	−2.7%
2011	814	−8.6%
2021	833	+2.3%

Source: Censuses

== Transport ==
The I/4 road (which connects the D4 motorway with Strakonice) briefly crosses the northwestern part of the municipal territory.

== Sights ==
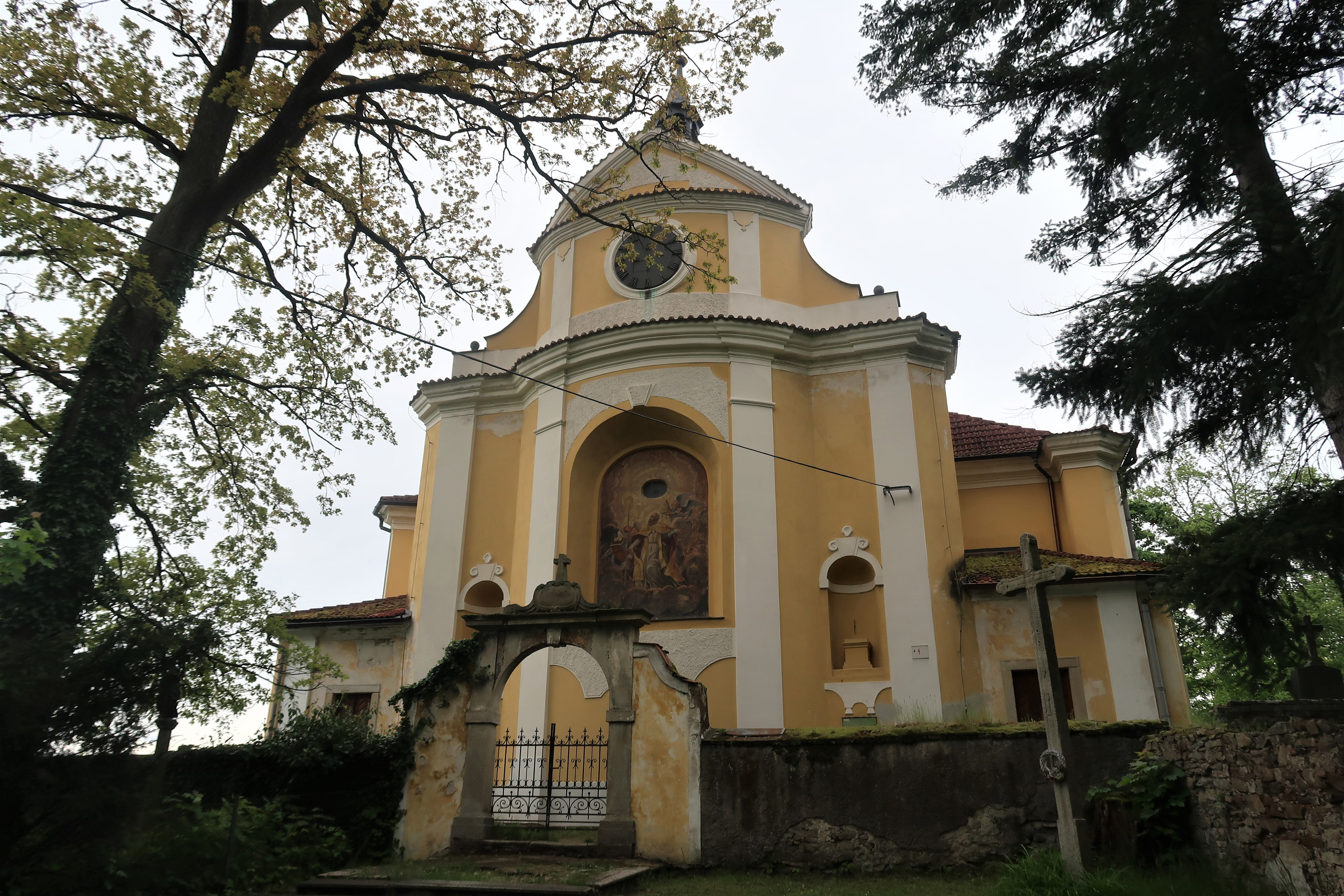
Church of Saint Nicholas

The main landmarks of Štěkeň are the castle and the church. The Štěkeň Castle was built in the early Baroque style in 1664–1665, on the site of an older fortress. The façade was modified in 1784 and in the 19th century. The castle is surrounded by a landscape park from the first half of the 19th century.

The Church of Saint Nicholas was built in the Baroque style in 1670. It replaced the Church of the Mary Magdalene, a wooden Gothic church built before 1457. In 1749, the church was rebuilt into its present form. It is an architecturally valuable building.

== Notable people ==
- Joseph Nicholas of Windisch-Graetz (1744–1802), Austrian nobleman; died here
