= Vráž (Písek District) =

- Municipality
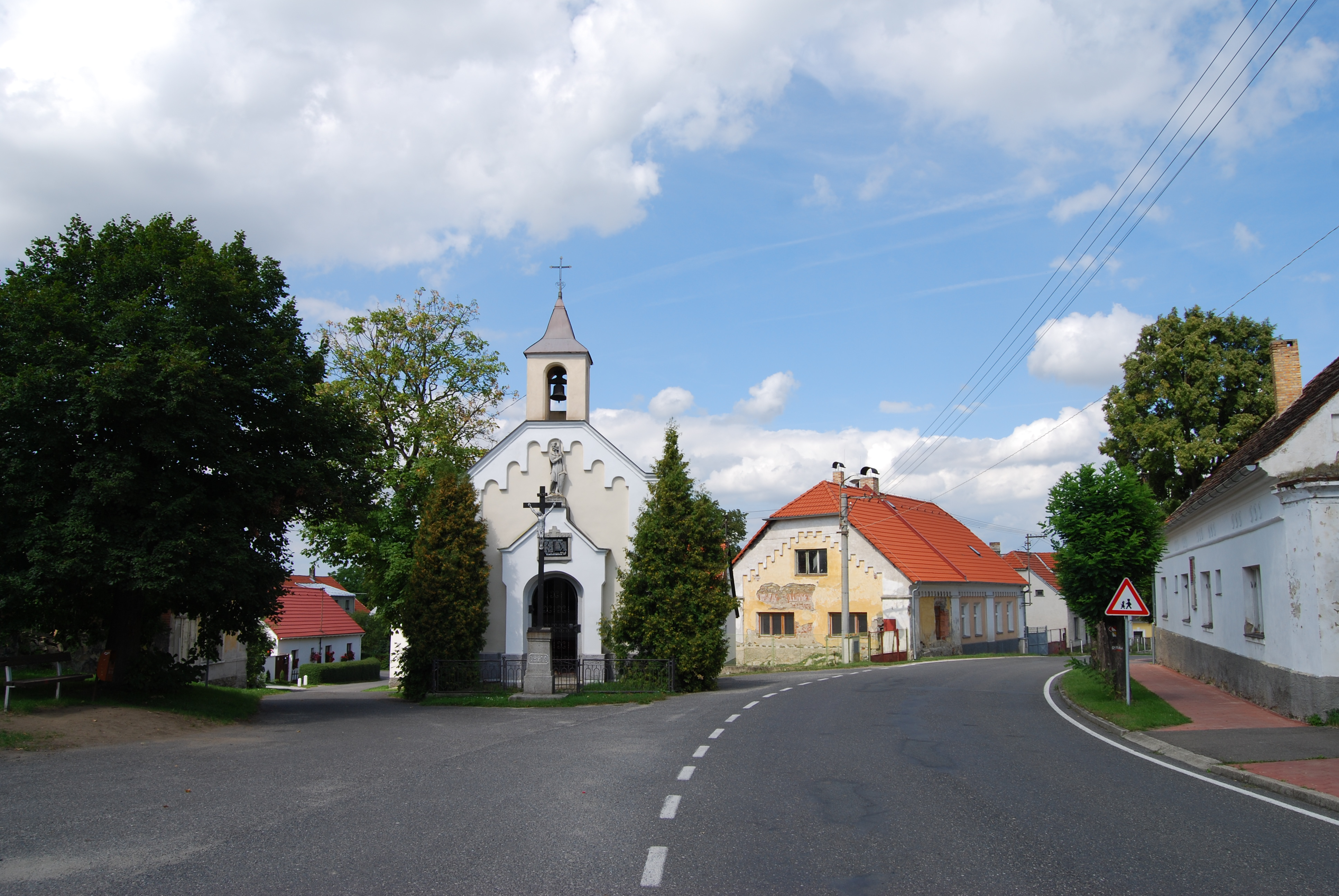
- Main street and Chapel of Saint Wenceslaus

- Flag Coat of arms

- Location in the Czech Republic
- Coordinates: 49°23′36″N 14°7′43″E
- Country: Czech Republic
- Region: South Bohemian
- District: Písek
- First mentioned: 1323

Area
  - Total: 7.38 km^{2} (2.85 sq mi)
- Elevation: 435 m (1,427 ft)

Population (2026-01-01)
  - Total: 324
  - Density: 43.9/km^{2} (114/sq mi)
- Time zone: UTC+1 (CET)
  - Summer (DST): UTC+2 (CEST)
- Postal codes: 397 01, 398 32
- Website: www.vraz-obec.cz

Vráž is a spa municipality in Písek District in the South Bohemian Region of the Czech Republic. It has about 300 inhabitants.

== Administrative division ==
Vráž consists of three municipal parts (in brackets population according to the 2021 census):

- Nová Vráž
- Stará Vráž
- Jistec

== Etymology ==
The origin of the name Vráž is uncertain and several hypotheses have emerged. The most likely interpretation is that the name was derived from the Slavic word ovrag, meaning 'depression', 'gorge'.

== Geography ==
Vráž is located about 9 kilometres (6 mi) north of Písek and 51 km (32 mi) northwest of České Budějovice. It lies on the border between the Tábor Uplands and Blatná Uplands. The highest point is a nameless hill at 483 m (1,585 ft) above sea level. The municipality borders the Orlík Reservoir in the east.

=== Climate ===
Vráž's climate is classified as humid continental climate (Köppen: Dfb; Trewartha: Dcbo). Among them, the annual average temperature is 8.5 °C (47.3 °F), the hottest month in July is 18.4 °C (65.1 °F), and the coldest month is −1.0 °C (30.2 °F) in January. The annual precipitation is 560.4 millimetres (22.06 in), of which June is the wettest with 78.3 millimetres (3.08 in), while February is the driest with only 25.9 millimetres (1.02 in). The extreme temperature throughout the year ranged from −31.2 °C (−24.2 °F) on 10 February 1956 to 39.7 °C (103.5 °F) on 27 July 1983.

Climate data for Vráž, 1991–2020 normals, extremes 1936–present
| Month | Jan | Feb | Mar | Apr | May | Jun | Jul | Aug | Sep | Oct | Nov | Dec | Year |
|---|---|---|---|---|---|---|---|---|---|---|---|---|---|
| Record high °C (°F) | 17.9 (64.2) | 20.1 (68.2) | 24.4 (75.9) | 29.8 (85.6) | 34.2 (93.6) | 35.8 (96.4) | 39.7 (103.5) | 37.9 (100.2) | 34.8 (94.6) | 28.6 (83.5) | 20.6 (69.1) | 17.5 (63.5) | 39.7 (103.5) |
| Mean daily maximum °C (°F) | 2.3 (36.1) | 4.5 (40.1) | 9.3 (48.7) | 15.4 (59.7) | 20.0 (68.0) | 23.5 (74.3) | 25.5 (77.9) | 25.5 (77.9) | 19.9 (67.8) | 13.6 (56.5) | 6.8 (44.2) | 2.8 (37.0) | 14.1 (57.4) |
| Daily mean °C (°F) | −1.0 (30.2) | −0.1 (31.8) | 3.6 (38.5) | 8.6 (47.5) | 13.3 (55.9) | 16.8 (62.2) | 18.4 (65.1) | 17.9 (64.2) | 13.0 (55.4) | 8.1 (46.6) | 3.4 (38.1) | −0.1 (31.8) | 8.5 (47.3) |
| Mean daily minimum °C (°F) | −4.2 (24.4) | −4.1 (24.6) | −1.0 (30.2) | 2.3 (36.1) | 6.8 (44.2) | 10.4 (50.7) | 12.1 (53.8) | 11.6 (52.9) | 7.6 (45.7) | 3.9 (39.0) | 0.4 (32.7) | −2.9 (26.8) | 3.6 (38.5) |
| Record low °C (°F) | −30.5 (−22.9) | −31.2 (−24.2) | −23.4 (−10.1) | −9.5 (14.9) | −5.0 (23.0) | −0.6 (30.9) | 2.6 (36.7) | 1.9 (35.4) | −3.2 (26.2) | −10.9 (12.4) | −15.2 (4.6) | −28.5 (−19.3) | −31.2 (−24.2) |
| Average precipitation mm (inches) | 30.7 (1.21) | 25.9 (1.02) | 36.4 (1.43) | 30.2 (1.19) | 64.6 (2.54) | 78.3 (3.08) | 76.2 (3.00) | 71.8 (2.83) | 41.8 (1.65) | 40.5 (1.59) | 33.3 (1.31) | 30.6 (1.20) | 560.4 (22.06) |
| Average snowfall cm (inches) | 14.9 (5.9) | 12.8 (5.0) | 5.6 (2.2) | 0.7 (0.3) | 0.0 (0.0) | 0.0 (0.0) | 0.0 (0.0) | 0.0 (0.0) | 0.0 (0.0) | 0.4 (0.2) | 3.3 (1.3) | 9.7 (3.8) | 47.5 (18.7) |
| Average relative humidity (%) | 84.8 | 80.4 | 76.6 | 71.1 | 71.7 | 72.2 | 72.1 | 73.2 | 80.0 | 84.2 | 88.1 | 86.9 | 78.4 |
| Mean monthly sunshine hours | 43.3 | 78.3 | 123.9 | 177.5 | 204.3 | 208.9 | 224.2 | 221.0 | 152.3 | 96.3 | 43.1 | 35.4 | 1,608.5 |
Source: Czech Hydrometeorological Institute

== History ==
The first written mention of Vráž is from 1323, when the village belonged to the Písek estate, acquired by the Rosenberg family. In 1473–1577, the estate was owned by the Švamberk family. In 1577, part of the estate with Vráž was bought by the Deym of Střítež family. From 1620 until the establishment of an independent municipality in 1848, Vráž belonged to the Čížová–Drhovle estate.

== Demographics ==
Historical population

| Year | Pop. | ±% |
|---|---|---|
| 1869 | 497 | — |
| 1880 | 478 | −3.8% |
| 1890 | 445 | −6.9% |
| 1900 | 420 | −5.6% |
| 1910 | 389 | −7.4% |

| Year | Pop. | ±% |
|---|---|---|
| 1921 | 396 | +1.8% |
| 1930 | 369 | −6.8% |
| 1950 | 430 | +16.5% |
| 1961 | 428 | −0.5% |
| 1970 | 393 | −8.2% |

| Year | Pop. | ±% |
|---|---|---|
| 1980 | 334 | −15.0% |
| 1991 | 329 | −1.5% |
| 2001 | 301 | −8.5% |
| 2011 | 299 | −0.7% |
| 2021 | 294 | −1.7% |

Source: Censuses

== Economy ==
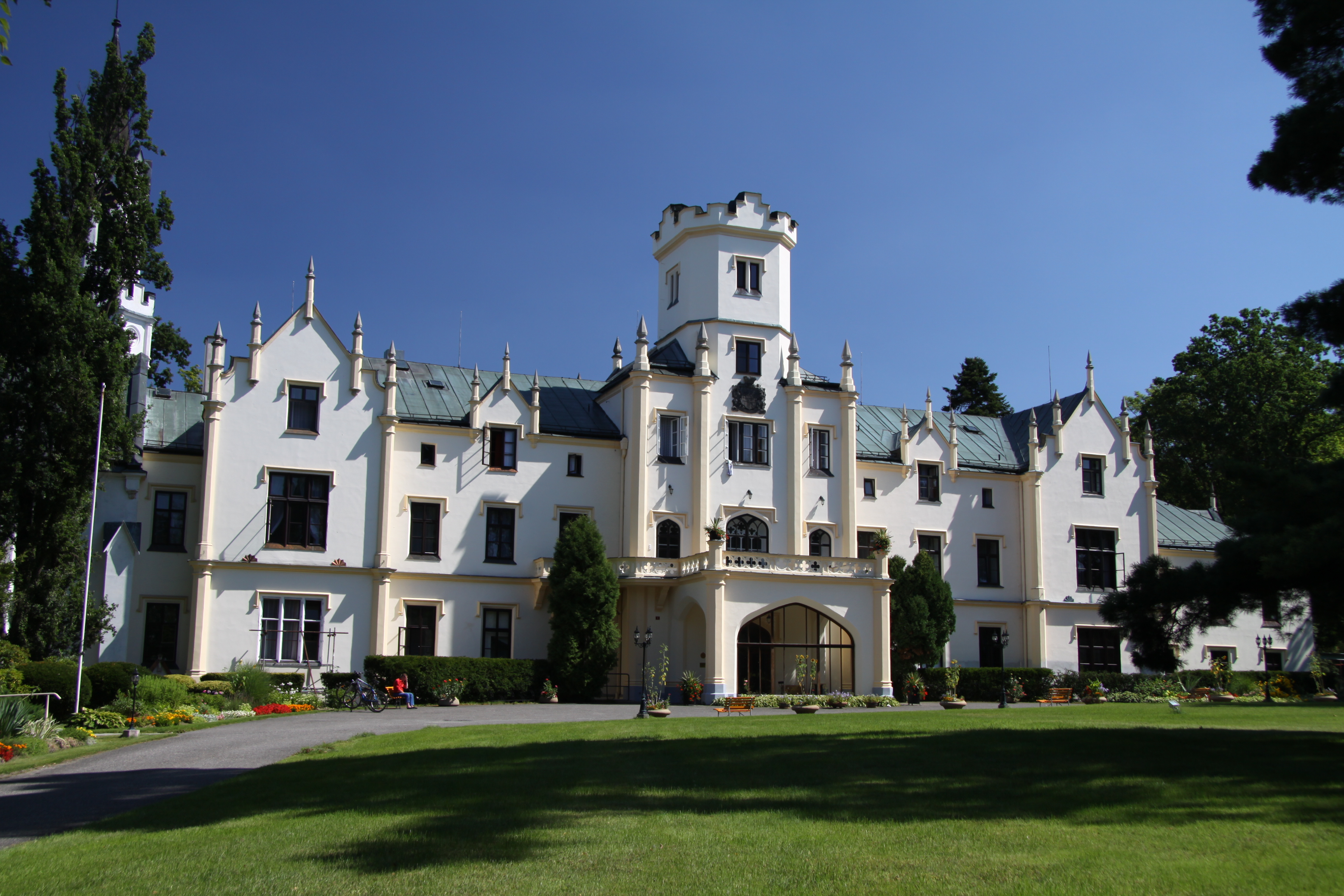
Vráž Castle, today a sanatorium

Vráž is known for its sanatorium with spa treatments. The musculoskeletal and nervous systems are treated here with mud.

== Transport ==
There are no railways or major roads passing through the municipality.

== Sights ==
The main landmark of Vráž is the Vráž Castle. It was built in the neo-Gothic style in 1869–1875. It was built for the Lobkowicz family on the site of an older hunting lodge. The castle is surrounded by a landscape park, founded at the end of the 19th century. In 1926, the Lobkowicz family sold the castle and the sanatorium was established in the premises of the castle.
