= Dobršín =

- Municipality
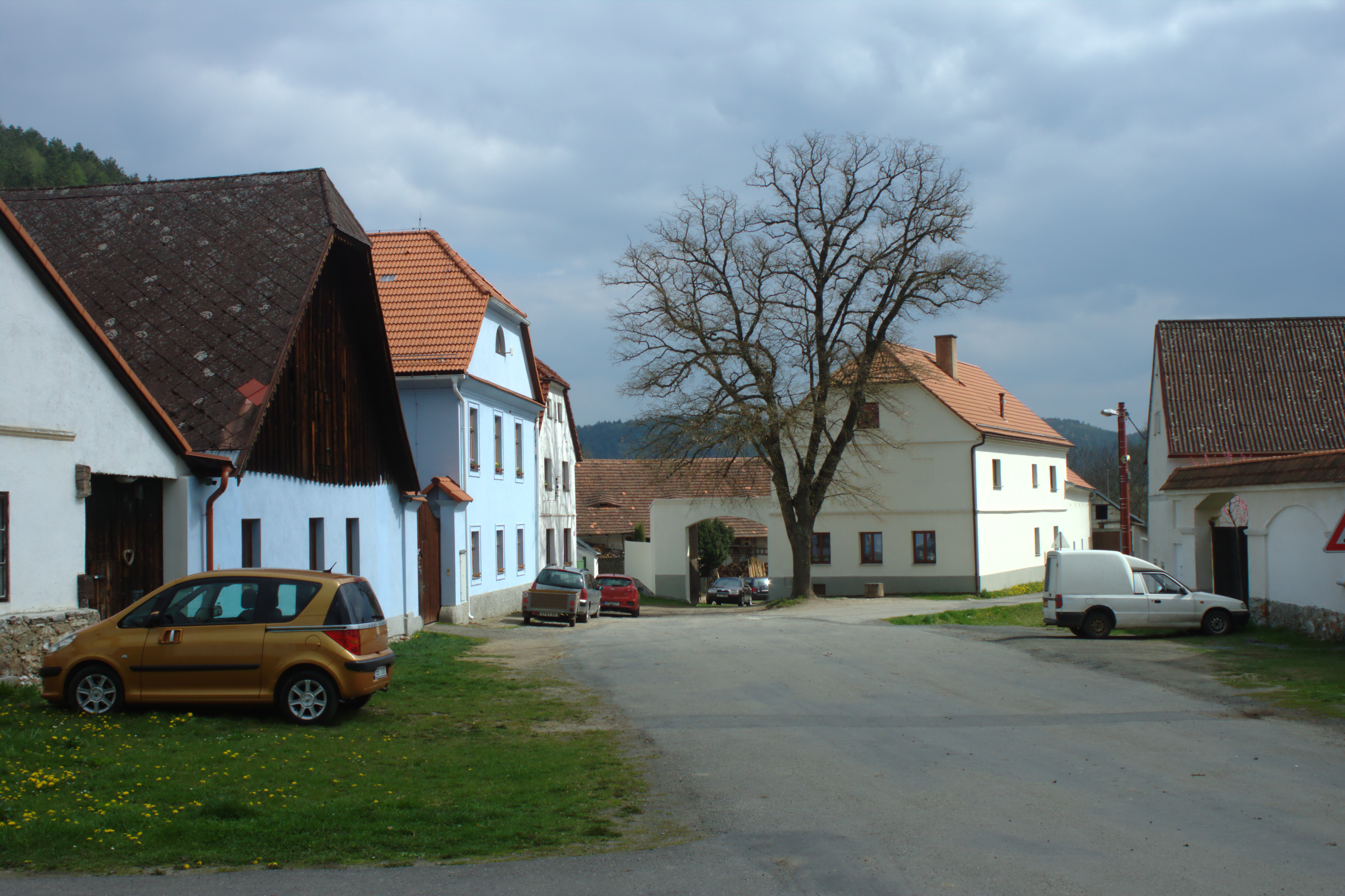
- Centre of Dobršín

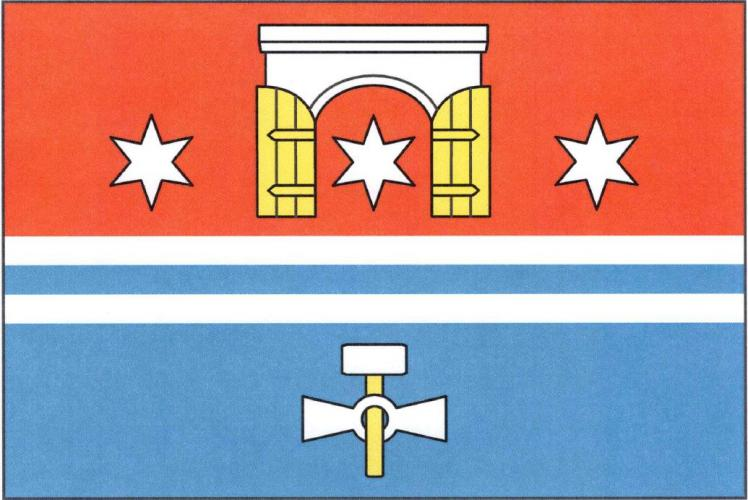
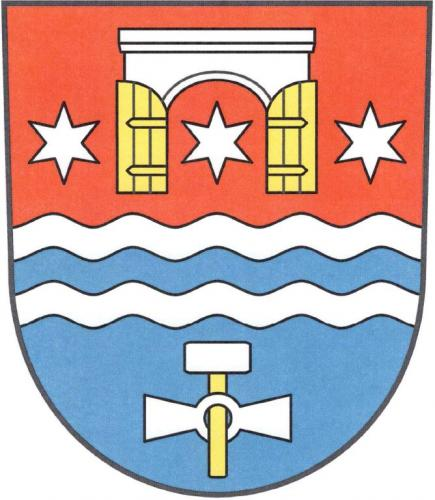
- Flag Coat of arms

- Location in the Czech Republic
- Coordinates: 49°15′41″N 13°33′40″E
- Country: Czech Republic
- Region: Plzeň
- District: Klatovy
- First mentioned: 1372

Area
  - Total: 6.64 km^{2} (2.56 sq mi)
- Elevation: 468 m (1,535 ft)

Population (2026-01-01)
  - Total: 104
  - Density: 15.7/km^{2} (40.6/sq mi)
- Time zone: UTC+1 (CET)
  - Summer (DST): UTC+2 (CEST)
- Postal code: 342 01
- Website: www.dobrsin.cz

Dobršín is a municipality and village in Klatovy District in the Plzeň Region of the Czech Republic. It has about 100 inhabitants. The village has well preserved folk architecture and is protected as a village monument reservation.

Dobršín lies approximately 25 kilometres (16 mi) south-east of Klatovy, 56 km (35 mi) south of Plzeň, and 111 km (69 mi) south-west of Prague.

== Demographics ==
Historical population
Year	Pop.	±%
1869	266	—
1880	269	+1.1%
1890	312	+16.0%
1900	274	−12.2%
1910	282	+2.9%
1921	267	−5.3%
1930	257	−3.7%
1950	241	−6.2%
1961	231	−4.1%
1970	213	−7.8%
1980	162	−23.9%
1991	126	−22.2%
2001	102	−19.0%
2011	104	+2.0%
2021	110	+5.8%
Source: Censuses
