= Čížová =

- Municipality
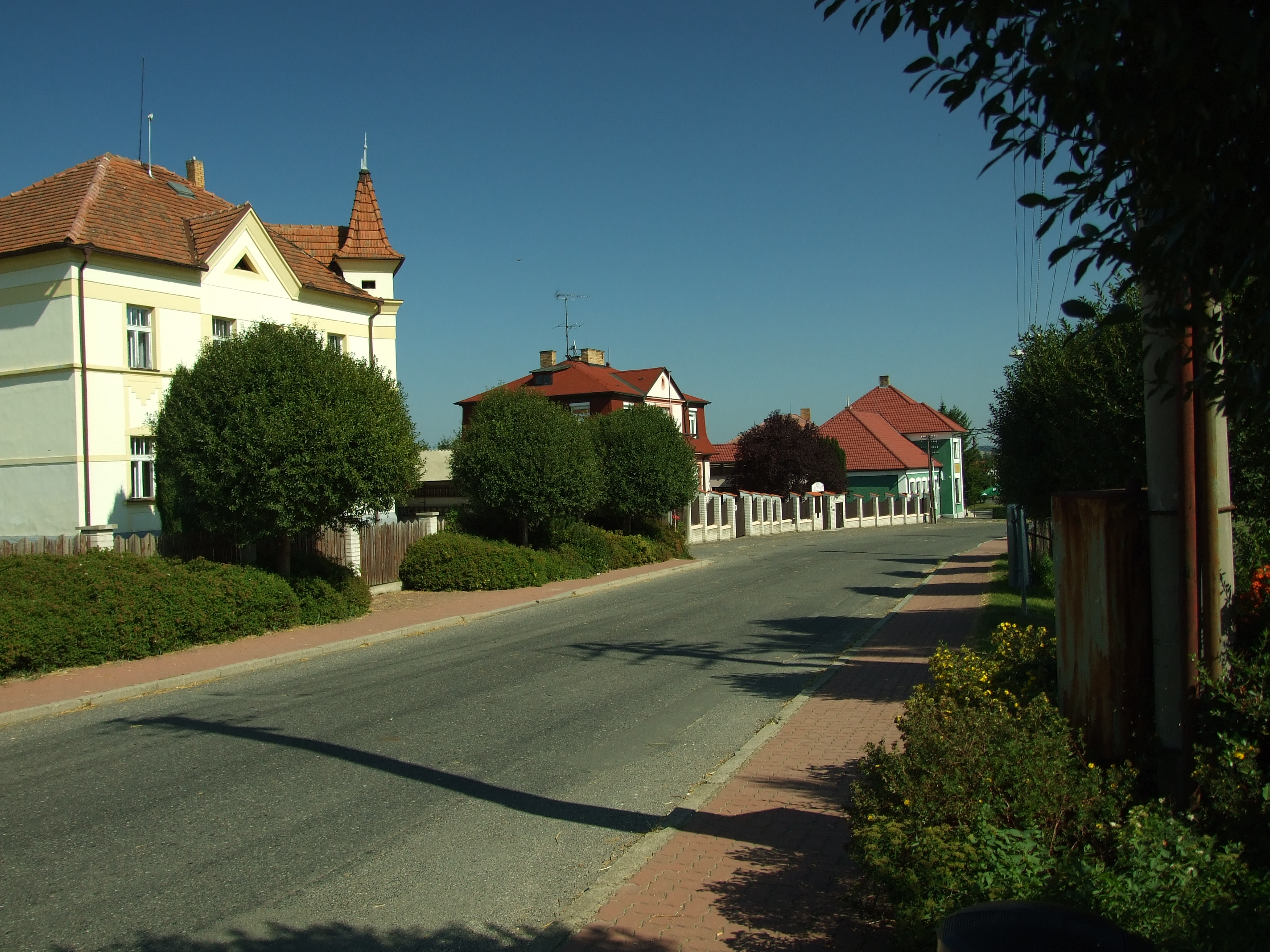
- A street in Čížová

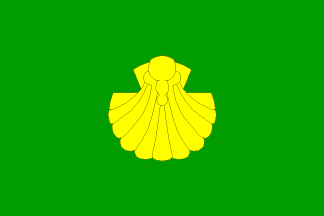
- Flag Coat of arms

- Location in the Czech Republic
- Coordinates: 49°21′25″N 14°5′35″E
- Country: Czech Republic
- Region: South Bohemian
- District: Písek
- First mentioned: 1316

Area
  - Total: 36.10 km^{2} (13.94 sq mi)
- Elevation: 448 m (1,470 ft)

Population (2026-01-01)
  - Total: 1,388
  - Density: 38.45/km^{2} (99.58/sq mi)
- Time zone: UTC+1 (CET)
  - Summer (DST): UTC+2 (CEST)
- Postal code: 398 31
- Website: www.cizova.cz

Čížová is a municipality and village in Písek District in the South Bohemian Region of the Czech Republic. It has about 1,400 inhabitants.

== Administrative division ==
Čížová consists of seven municipal parts (in brackets population according to the 2021 census):

- Čížová (602)
- Borečnice (57)
- Bošovice (107)
- Krašovice (135)
- Nová Ves (96)
- Topělec (207)
- Zlivice (126)

== Etymology ==
The adjective čížová (from čížek, i.e. 'siskin') was probably originally associated with some hill on which many siskins lived.

== Geography ==
Čížová is located about 6 kilometres (4 mi) northwest of Písek and 49 km (30 mi) northwest of České Budějovice. It lies on the border of the Tábor Uplands and Blatná Uplands. The highest point is a hill at 571 m (1,873 ft) above sea level. The Otava River forms the eastern municipal border.

== History ==
The first written mention of Čížová is from 1316. An untrustworthy mention of Čížová related to the year 942 appears in the chronicle of Wenceslaus Hajek from 1541. Until 1509, the area was owned by Czech kings. In 1509–1547, Čížová was a property of the town of Písek. Notable owners of Čížová were the Deym of Střítež family, who held it from 1560 to 1726. Čížová was then owned by the Czernin family (1726–1753) and by the Lobkowicz family (1753–1932).

== Demographics ==
Historical population

Year	Pop.	±%
1869	1,485	—
1880	1,620	+9.1%
1890	1,622	+0.1%
1900	1,526	−5.9%
1910	1,487	−2.6%

Year	Pop.	±%
1921	1,481	−0.4%
1930	1,395	−5.8%
1950	1,110	−20.4%
1961	1,089	−1.9%
1970	944	−13.3%

Year	Pop.	±%
1980	935	−1.0%
1991	854	−8.7%
2001	820	−4.0%
2011	1,105	+34.8%
2021	1,330	+20.4%

Source: Censuses

== Transport ==
The D4 motorway briefly passes through the southern part of the municipal territory and runs along the municipal border.

Čížová is located on the railway line Prague–České Budějovice.

== Sights ==
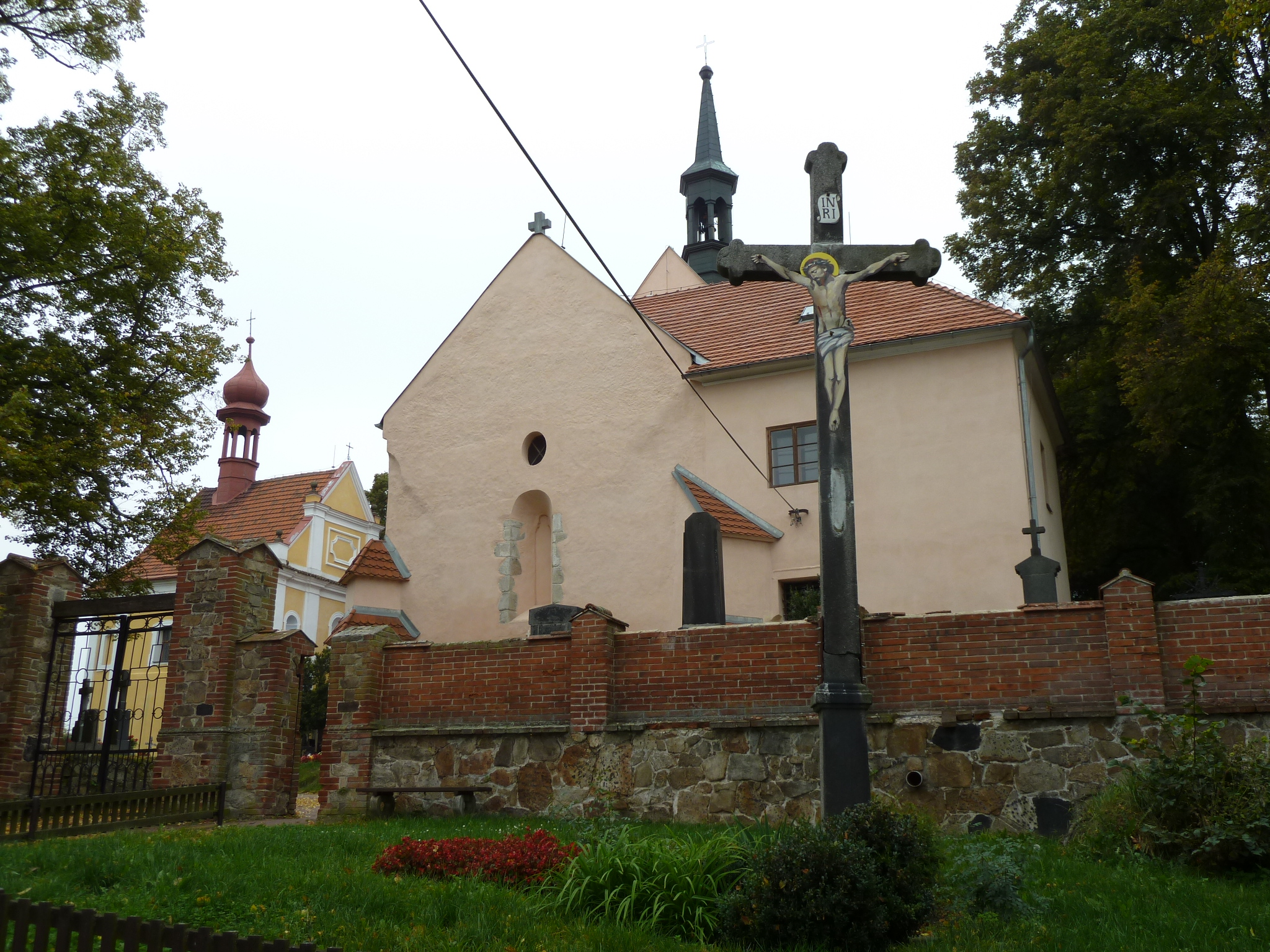
Church of Saint James the Great

The main landmark is the Church of Saint James the Great, which is situated on a hill above Čížová. The church has a Gothic core and its existence was first documented in 1407. The church is surrounded by a cemetery on which stays the Chapel of Saint Barbara and a historical bell tower. The Chapel of Saint Barbara dates from 1759.
