= Slaník =

- Municipality
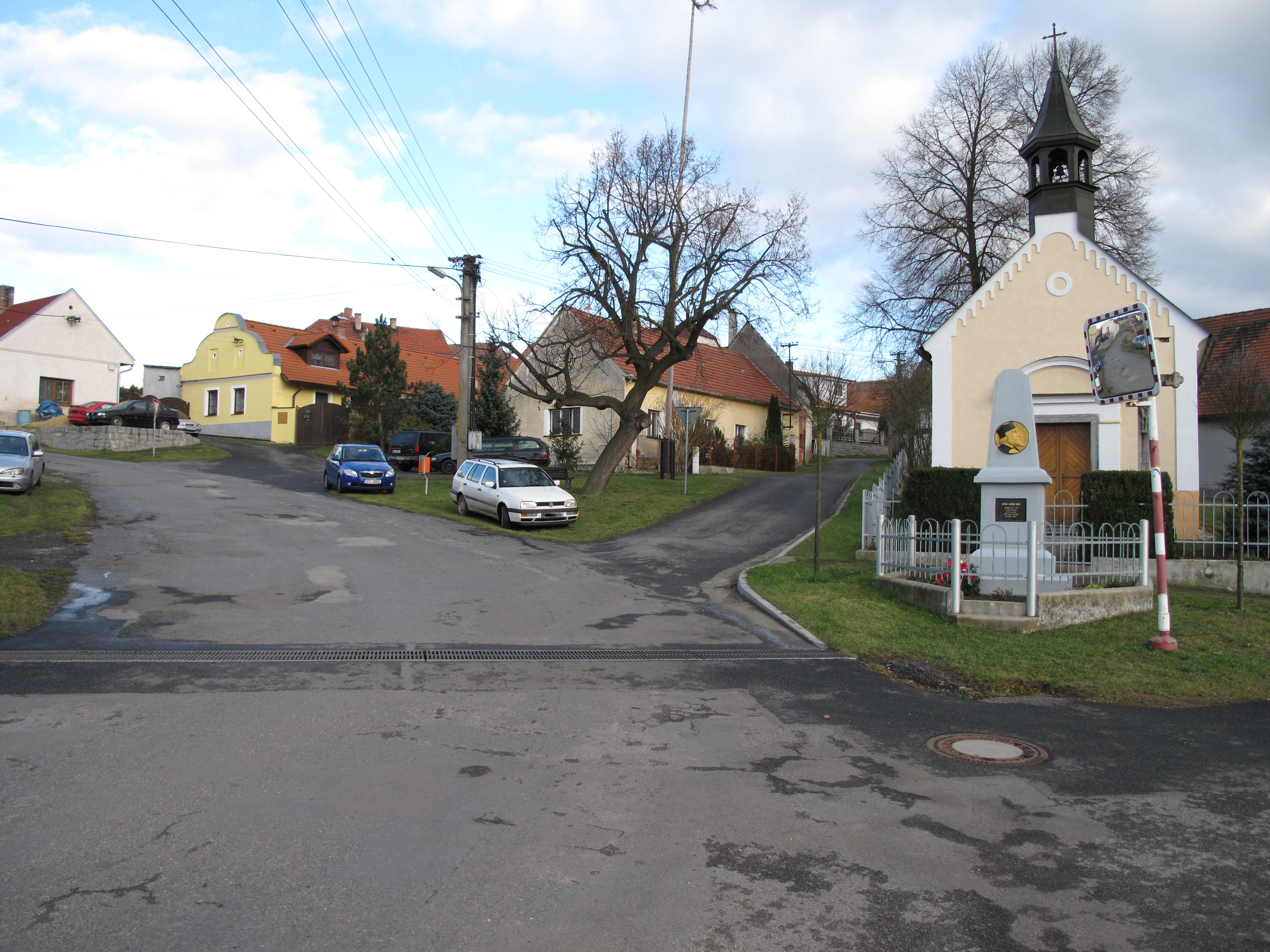
- Centre of Slaník

- Flag Coat of arms

- Location in the Czech Republic
- Coordinates: 49°16′6″N 13°57′6″E
- Country: Czech Republic
- Region: South Bohemian
- District: Strakonice
- First mentioned: 1359

Area
  - Total: 2.98 km^{2} (1.15 sq mi)
- Elevation: 395 m (1,296 ft)

Population (2026-01-01)
  - Total: 142
  - Density: 47.7/km^{2} (123/sq mi)
- Time zone: UTC+1 (CET)
  - Summer (DST): UTC+2 (CEST)
- Postal code: 386 01
- Website: www.obec-slanik.cz

Slaník is a municipality and village in Strakonice District in the South Bohemian Region of the Czech Republic. It has about 100 inhabitants.

Slaník lies approximately 4 kilometres (2 mi) east of Strakonice, 51 km (32 mi) north-west of České Budějovice, and 97 km (60 mi) south of Prague.

== Demographics ==
Historical population
| Year | Pop. | ±% |
|---|---|---|
| 1869 | 192 | — |
| 1880 | 229 | +19.3% |
| 1890 | 210 | −8.3% |
| 1900 | 228 | +8.6% |
| 1910 | 189 | −17.1% |
| 1921 | 208 | +10.1% |
| 1930 | 192 | −7.7% |
| 1950 | 165 | −14.1% |
| 1961 | 152 | −7.9% |
| 1970 | 141 | −7.2% |
| 1980 | 132 | −6.4% |
| 1991 | 140 | +6.1% |
| 2001 | 118 | −15.7% |
| 2011 | 157 | +33.1% |
| 2021 | 139 | −11.5% |
Source: Censuses
