= Přešťovice =

- Municipality
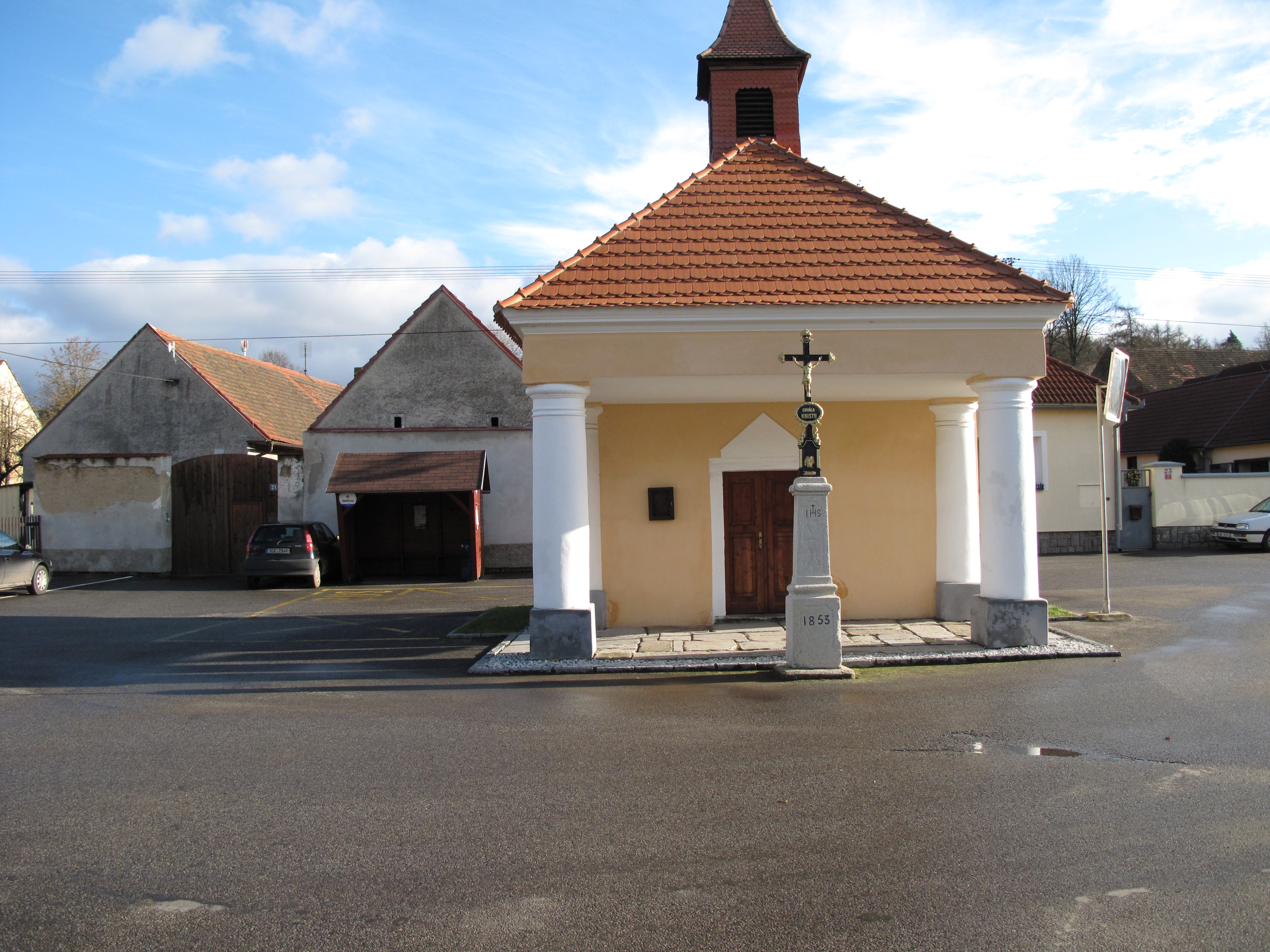
- Chapel of Our Lady of the Snows

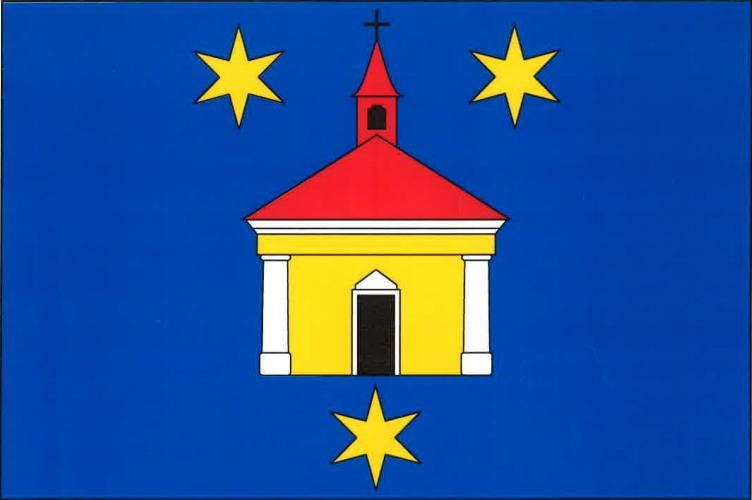
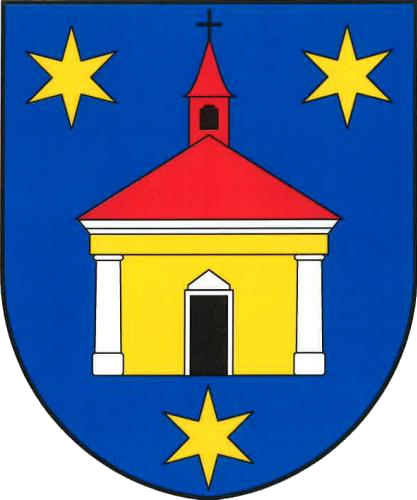
- Flag Coat of arms

- Location in the Czech Republic
- Coordinates: 49°16′38″N 13°58′28″E
- Country: Czech Republic
- Region: South Bohemian
- District: Strakonice
- First mentioned: 1379

Area
  - Total: 10.51 km^{2} (4.06 sq mi)
- Elevation: 391 m (1,283 ft)

Population (2026-01-01)
  - Total: 479
  - Density: 45.6/km^{2} (118/sq mi)
- Time zone: UTC+1 (CET)
  - Summer (DST): UTC+2 (CEST)
- Postal code: 386 01
- Website: www.prestovice.cz

Přešťovice (German: Prestowitz) is a municipality and village in Strakonice District in the South Bohemian Region of the Czech Republic. It has about 500 inhabitants.

Přešťovice lies approximately 7 kilometres (4 mi) east of Strakonice, 50 km (31 mi) north-west of České Budějovice, and 95 km (59 mi) south of Prague.

== Administrative division ==
Přešťovice consists of three municipal parts (in brackets population according to the 2021 census):

- Přešťovice (337)
- Brusy (45)
- Kbelnice (100)

== Demographics ==
Historical population
Year	Pop.	±%
1869	875	—
1880	956	+9.3%
1890	942	−1.5%
1900	979	+3.9%
1910	868	−11.3%
1921	850	−2.1%
1930	756	−11.1%
1950	618	−18.3%
1961	570	−7.8%
1970	552	−3.2%
1980	539	−2.4%
1991	460	−14.7%
2001	413	−10.2%
2011	391	−5.3%
2021	482	+23.3%
Source: Censuses
