= Vojníkov =

- Municipality
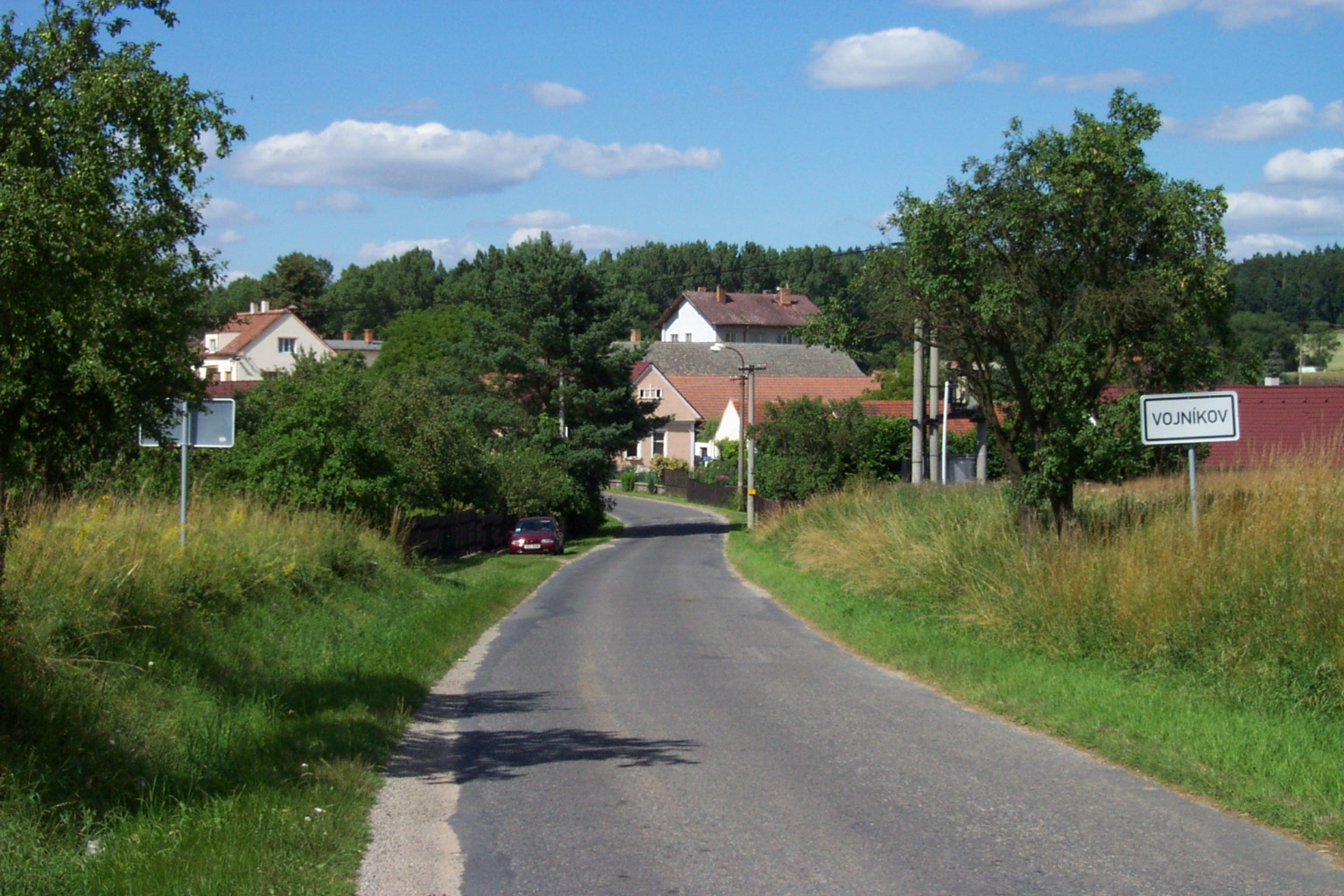
- Entrance to Vojníkov

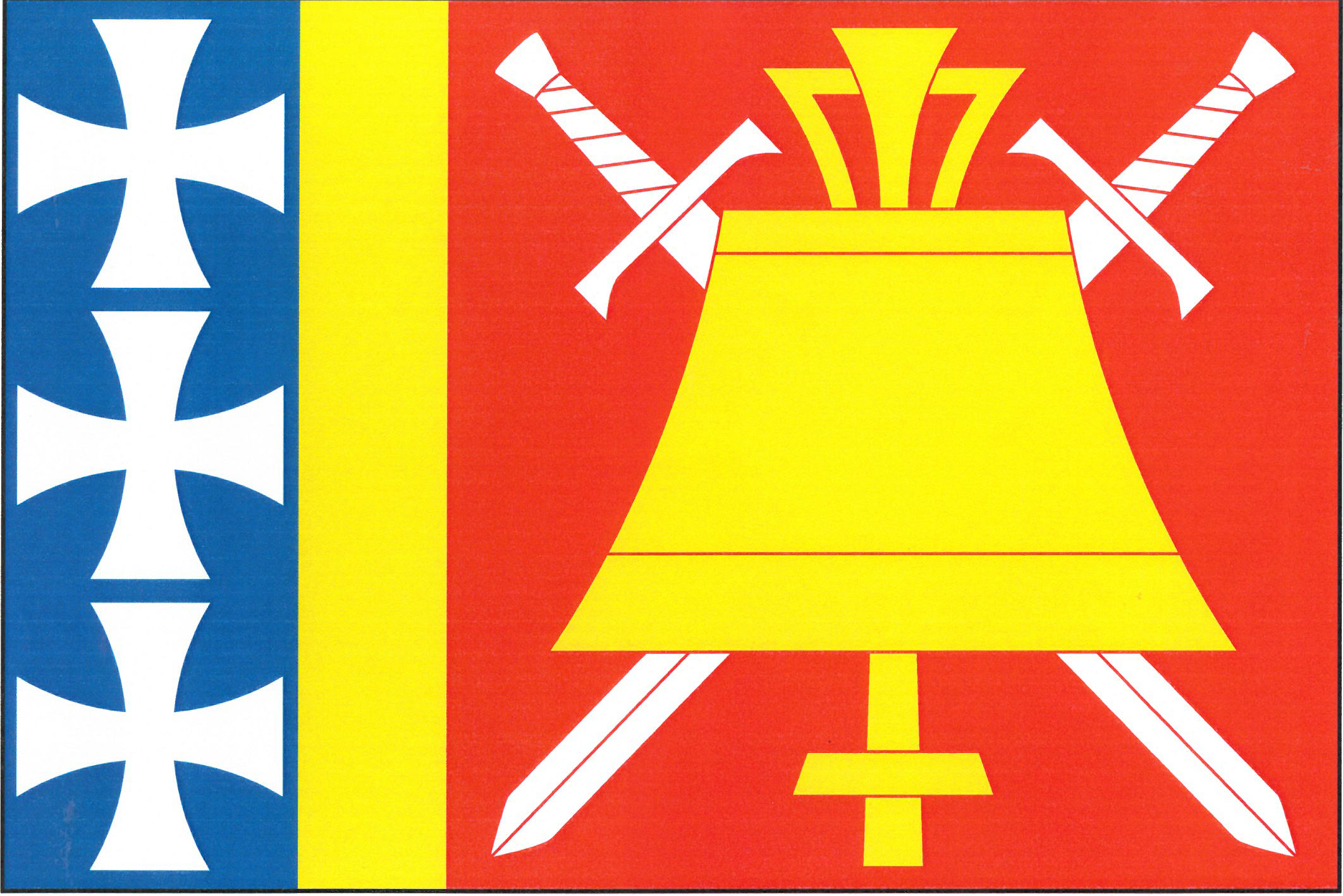
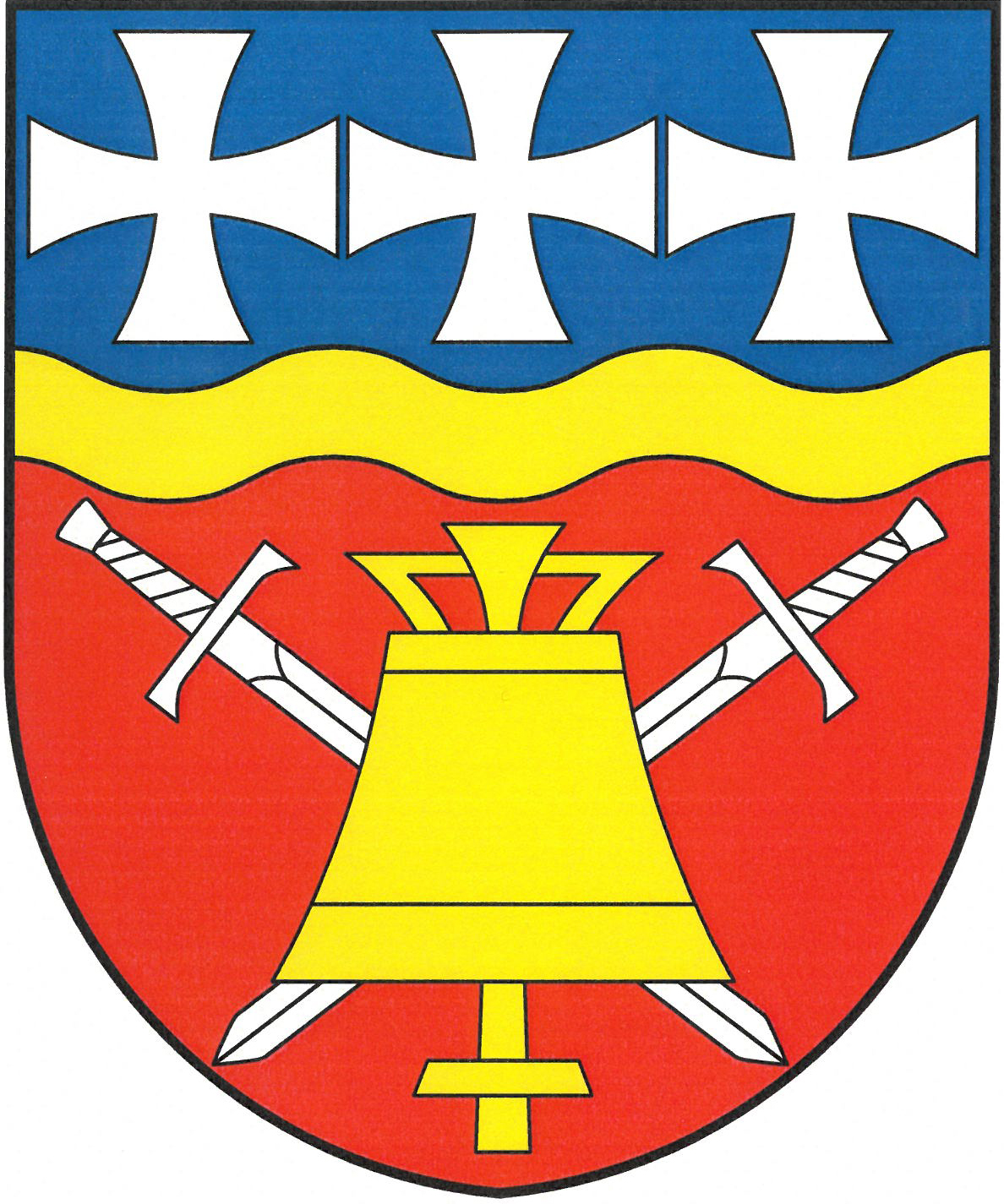
- Flag Coat of arms

- Location in the Czech Republic
- Coordinates: 49°21′14″N 14°10′37″E
- Country: Czech Republic
- Region: South Bohemian
- District: Písek
- First mentioned: 1542

Area
  - Total: 11.78 km^{2} (4.55 sq mi)
- Elevation: 425 m (1,394 ft)

Population (2026-01-01)
  - Total: 85
  - Density: 7.2/km^{2} (19/sq mi)
- Time zone: UTC+1 (CET)
  - Summer (DST): UTC+2 (CEST)
- Postal code: 398 18
- Website: www.vojnikov.cz

Vojníkov is a municipality and village in Písek District in the South Bohemian Region of the Czech Republic. It has about 90 inhabitants.

== Administrative division ==
Vojníkov consists of three municipal parts (in brackets population according to the 2021 census):

- Vojníkov (40)
- Držov (19)
- Louka (24)

== Etymology ==
The name Vojníkov is derived from the personal name Vojník, meaning "Vojník's (court)".

== Geography ==
Vojníkov is located about 5 kilometres (3 mi) north of Písek and 46 km (29 mi) northwest of České Budějovice. It lies in the Tábor Uplands. The municipality is situated on the right banks of the Otava River, which forms the western municipal border.

== History ==
The first written mention of Vojníkov and Držov is from 1542. Louka was first mentioned in 1323.

== Demographics ==
Historical population

Year	Pop.	±%
1869	371	—
1880	372	+0.3%
1890	390	+4.8%
1900	392	+0.5%
1910	371	−5.4%

Year	Pop.	±%
1921	348	−6.2%
1930	299	−14.1%
1950	194	−35.1%
1961	162	−16.5%
1970	142	−12.3%

Year	Pop.	±%
1980	121	−14.8%
1991	106	−12.4%
2001	75	−29.2%
2011	79	+5.3%
2021	83	+5.1%

Source: Censuses

== Transport ==
There are no railways or major roads passing through the municipality.

== Sights ==
In the centre of Vojníkov is a small rural chapel with Empire elements. It dates from 1861.
