= Velké Hydčice =

- Municipality
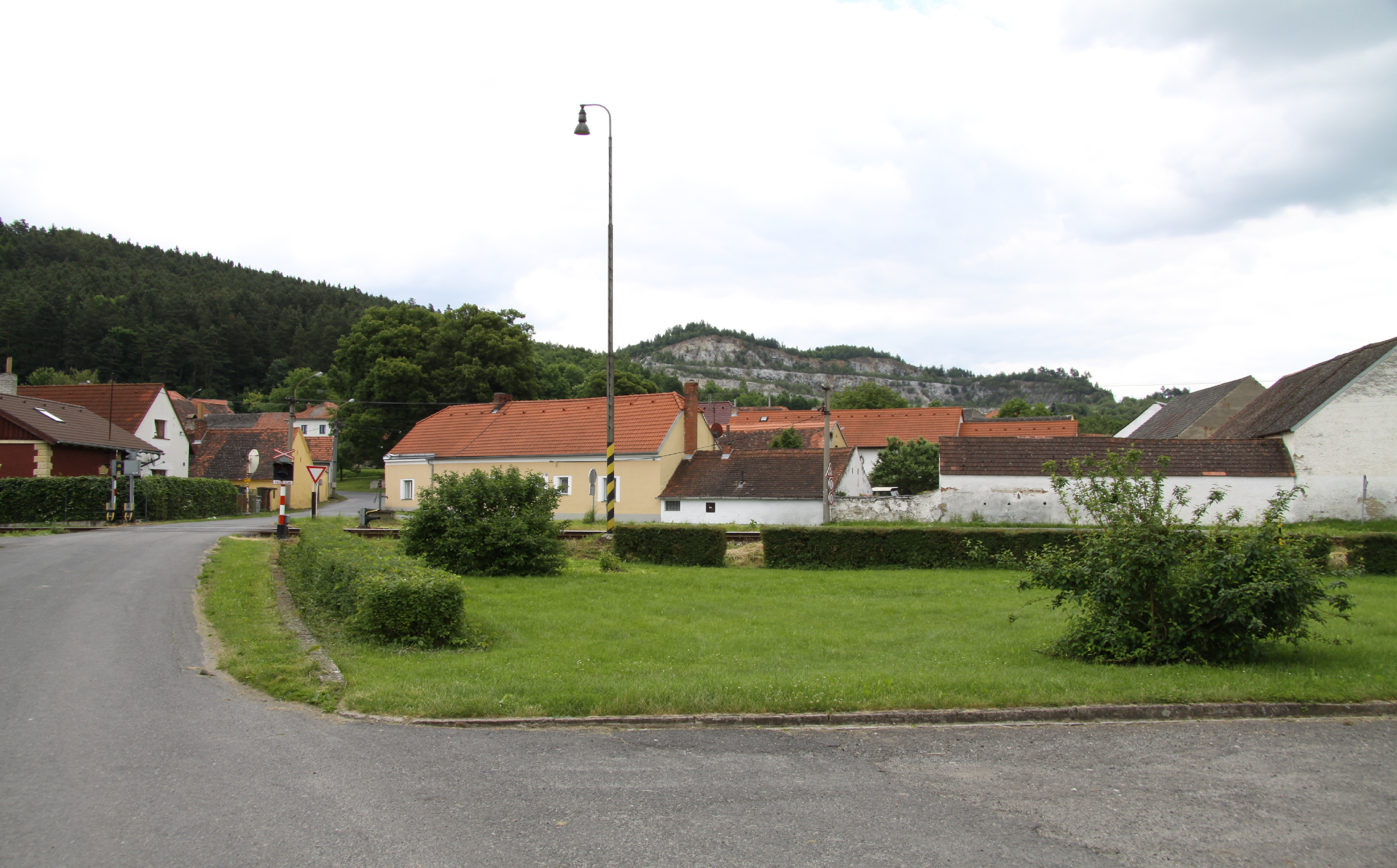
- Centre of Velké Hydčice

- Flag Coat of arms

- Location in the Czech Republic
- Coordinates: 49°17′57″N 13°40′5″E
- Country: Czech Republic
- Region: Plzeň
- District: Klatovy
- First mentioned: 1045

Area
  - Total: 5.11 km^{2} (1.97 sq mi)
- Elevation: 343 m (1,125 ft)

Population (2026-01-01)
  - Total: 218
  - Density: 42.7/km^{2} (110/sq mi)
- Time zone: UTC+1 (CET)
  - Summer (DST): UTC+2 (CEST)
- Postal code: 341 01
- Website: www.velkehydcice.cz

Velké Hydčice is a municipality and village in Klatovy District in the Plzeň Region of the Czech Republic. It has about 200 inhabitants. The historic centre of the village is well preserved and is protected as a village monument zone.

Velké Hydčice lies approximately 30 kilometres (19 mi) east of Klatovy, 55 km (34 mi) south-east of Plzeň, and 103 km (64 mi) south-west of Prague.

== History ==
The first written mention of Velké Hydčice is from 1045, when it was property of the Břevnov Monastery.

== Demographics ==
Historical population
Year	Pop.	±%
1869	190	—
1880	194	+2.1%
1890	266	+37.1%
1900	305	+14.7%
1910	385	+26.2%
1921	352	−8.6%
1930	316	−10.2%
1950	235	−25.6%
1961	343	+46.0%
1970	304	−11.4%
1980	280	−7.9%
1991	242	−13.6%
2001	229	−5.4%
2011	237	+3.5%
2021	244	+3.0%
Source: Censuses
