= Radětice =

Radětice may refer to places in the Czech Republic:

- Radětice (Příbram District), a municipality and village in the Central Bohemian Region
- Radětice (Tábor District), a municipality and village in the South Bohemian Region
