= Borovany (disambiguation) =

Borovany is a town in the Czech Republic.

Borovany may also refer to places in the Czech Republic:

- Borovany (Písek District), a municipality and village in the South Bohemian Region
- Borovany, a village and part of Bor (Tachov District) in the Plzeň Region
