= Borovany (Písek District) =

- Municipality
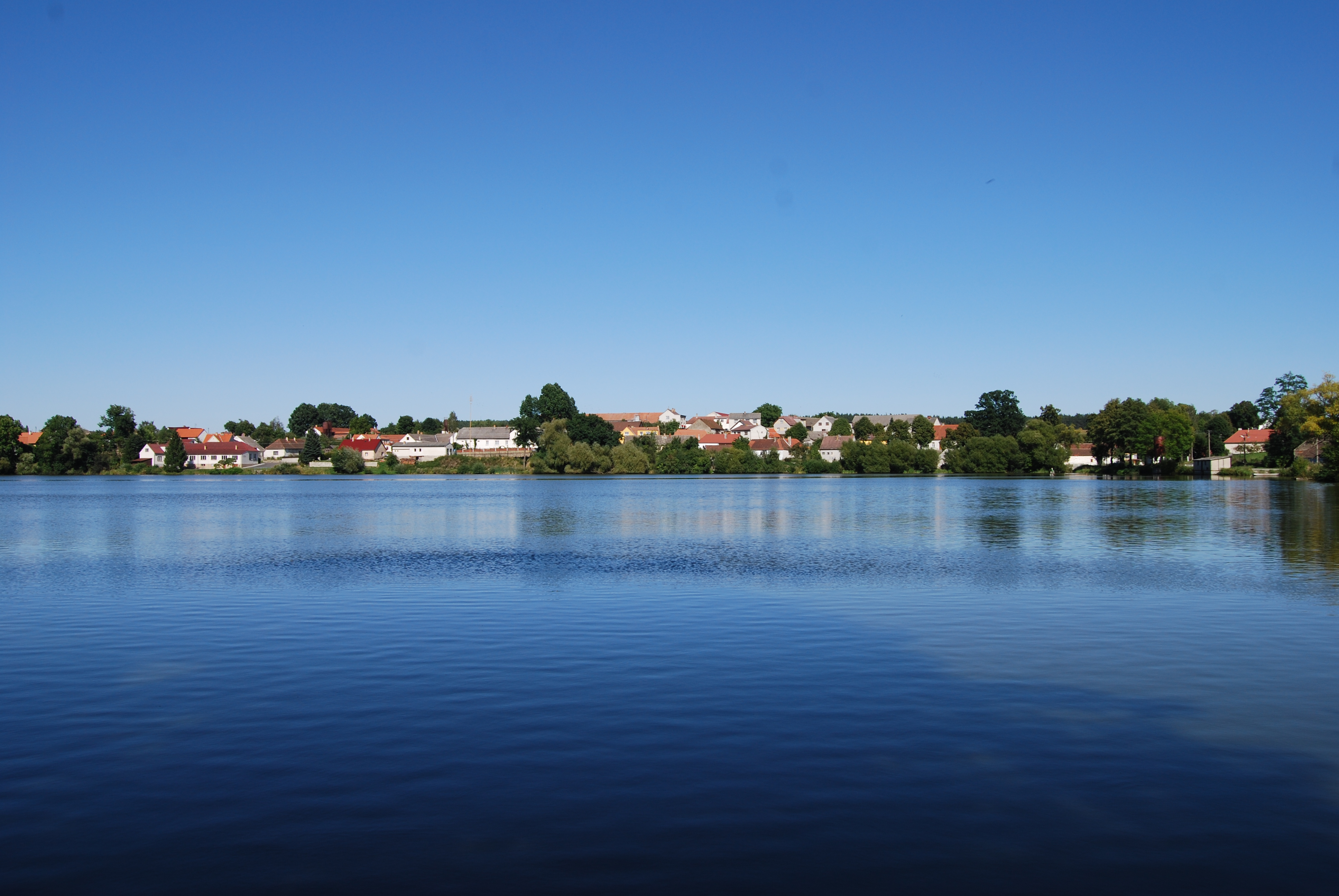
- View over Velký Borovanský rybník

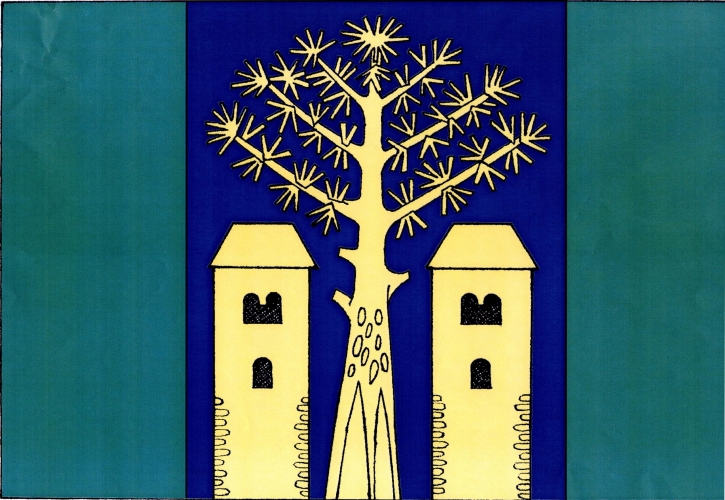
- Flag Coat of arms

- Location in the Czech Republic
- Coordinates: 49°20′35″N 14°23′33″E
- Country: Czech Republic
- Region: South Bohemian
- District: Písek
- First mentioned: 1219

Area
  - Total: 6.37 km^{2} (2.46 sq mi)
- Elevation: 441 m (1,447 ft)

Population (2026-01-01)
  - Total: 212
  - Density: 33.3/km^{2} (86.2/sq mi)
- Time zone: UTC+1 (CET)
  - Summer (DST): UTC+2 (CEST)
- Postal code: 398 43
- Website: www.obecborovany.cz

Borovany is a municipality and village in Písek District in the South Bohemian Region of the Czech Republic. It has about 200 inhabitants.

== Etymology ==
The village used to be surrounded by pine forests (in Czech bory), which gave the village its name.

== Geography ==
Borovany is located about 17 kilometres (11 mi) east of Písek and 40 km (25 mi) north of České Budějovice. It lies in the Tábor Uplands. The highest point is at 488 m (1,601 ft) above sea level. The village is situated on the shore of the fishpond Velký Borovanský rybník.

== History ==
The first written mention of Borovany is from 1219. The village was part of the Bernartice estate. Two fortresses were built here around 1399. Adam Bechyně of Lažany took control in the mid-15th century and built a third fortress. In 1620, During the Thirty Years' War, all the peasants of Borovany were killed because of their armed resistance. Adam's grandson Oldřich sold Borovany to the Jesuits in 1623. The village was described as abandoned in 1657, but was later repopulated.

None of the local fortresses survived. The last one was demolished in 1867.

== Demographics ==
Historical population

Year	Pop.	±%
1869	471	—
1880	496	+5.3%
1890	487	−1.8%
1900	482	−1.0%
1910	485	+0.6%

Year	Pop.	±%
1921	471	−2.9%
1930	425	−9.8%
1950	308	−27.5%
1961	322	+4.5%
1970	311	−3.4%

Year	Pop.	±%
1980	266	−14.5%
1991	237	−10.9%
2001	219	−7.6%
2011	201	−8.2%
2021	205	+2.0%

Source: Censuses

== Transport ==
There are no railways or major roads passing through the municipality.

== Sights ==
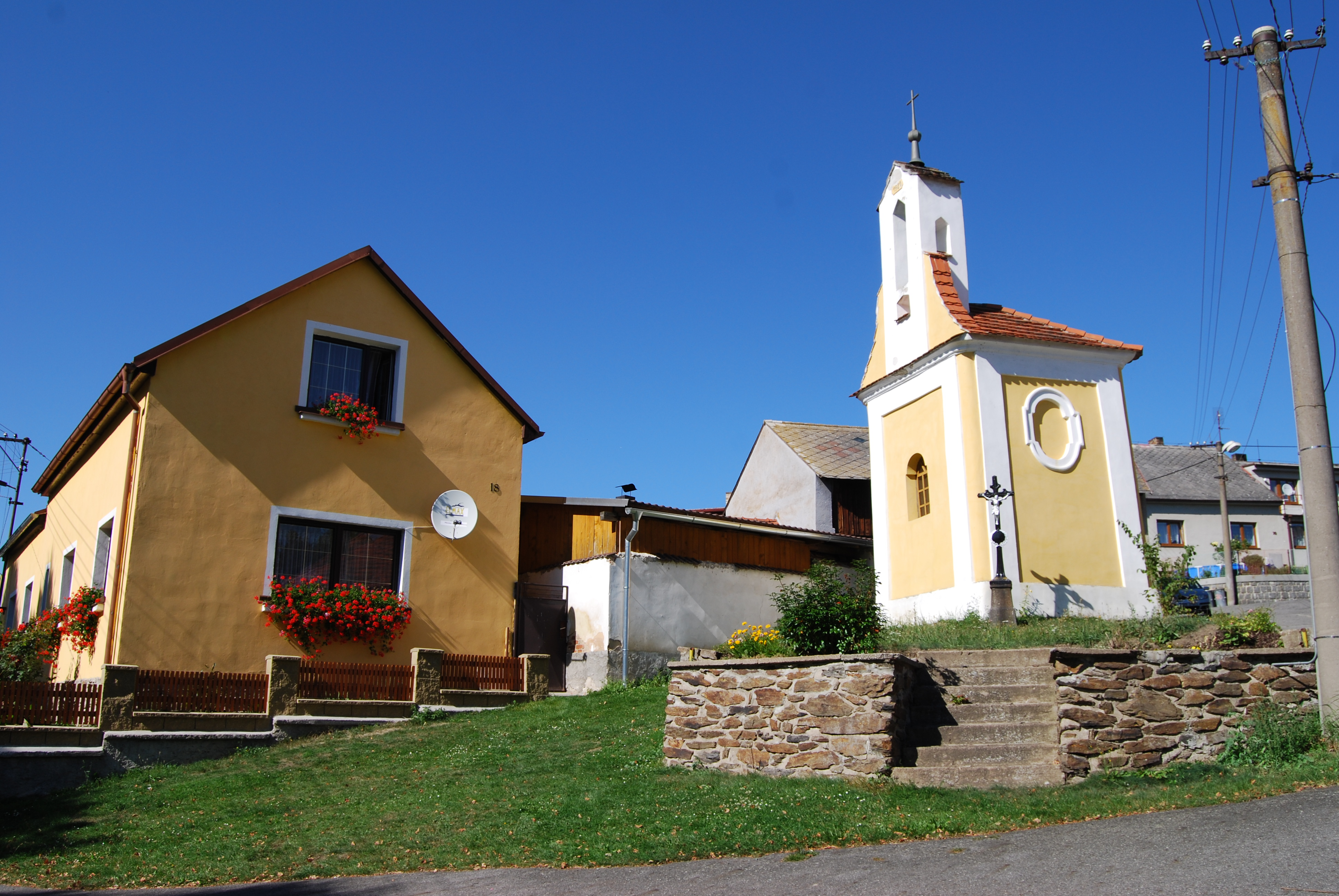
Chapel of the Virgin Mary

The main cultural landmark of Borovany is the Chapel of the Virgin Mary. It was built in the pseudo-Baroque style in the 18th century and rebuilt in the first half of the 19th century.
