= Radětice (Tábor District) =

- Municipality
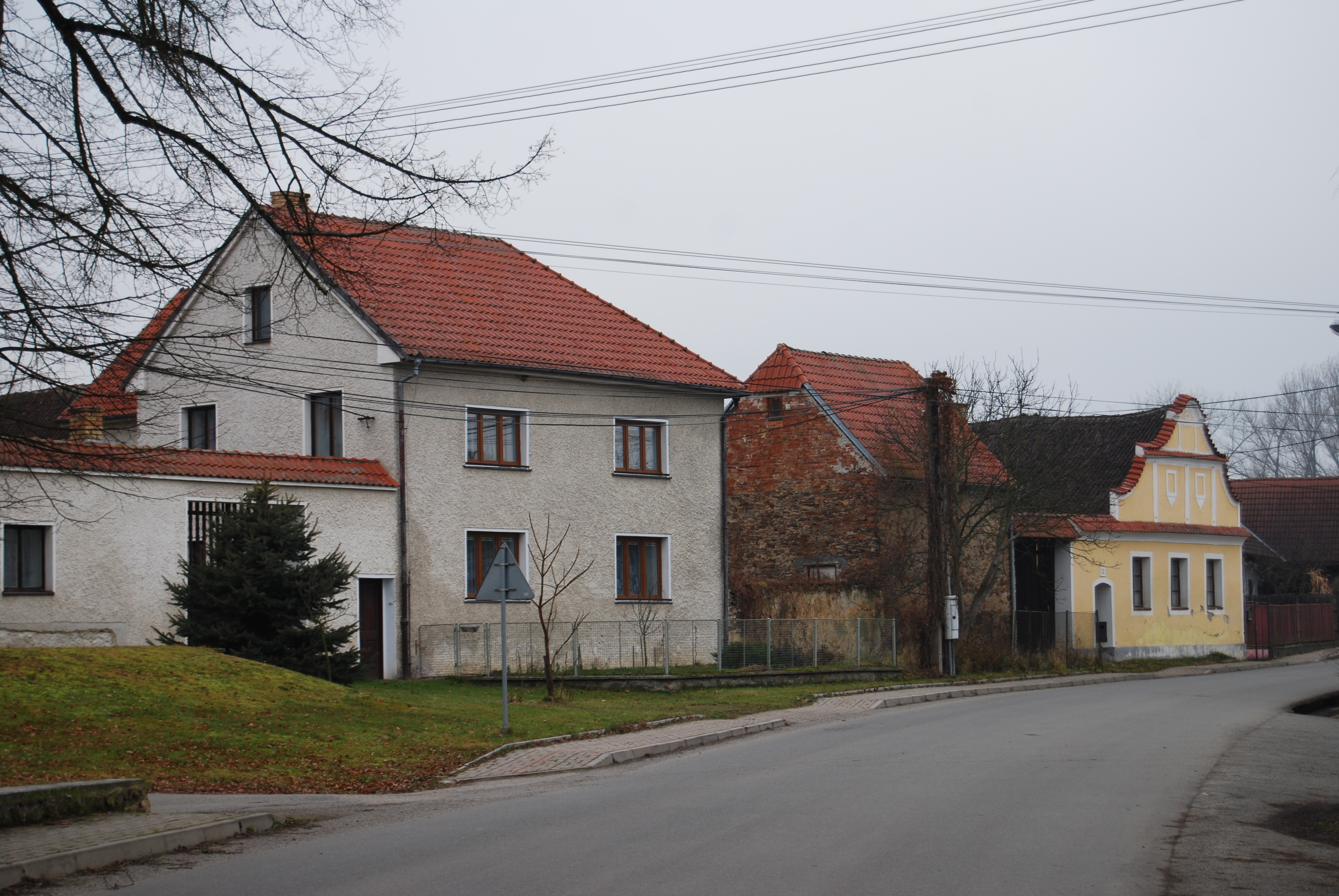
- Centre of Radětice

- Flag Coat of arms

- Location in the Czech Republic
- Coordinates: 49°19′10″N 14°26′29″E
- Country: Czech Republic
- Region: South Bohemian
- District: Tábor
- First mentioned: 1291

Area
  - Total: 14.72 km^{2} (5.68 sq mi)
- Elevation: 421 m (1,381 ft)

Population (2026-01-01)
  - Total: 252
  - Density: 17.1/km^{2} (44.3/sq mi)
- Time zone: UTC+1 (CET)
  - Summer (DST): UTC+2 (CEST)
- Postal code: 391 65
- Website: www.radetice.cz

Radětice (German: Radietitz) is a municipality and village in Tábor District in the South Bohemian Region of the Czech Republic. It has about 300 inhabitants.

== Demographics ==
Historical population
| Year | Pop. | ±% |
|---|---|---|
| 1869 | 581 | — |
| 1880 | 562 | −3.3% |
| 1890 | 543 | −3.4% |
| 1900 | 566 | +4.2% |
| 1910 | 582 | +2.8% |
| 1921 | 550 | −5.5% |
| 1930 | 510 | −7.3% |
| 1950 | 362 | −29.0% |
| 1961 | 375 | +3.6% |
| 1970 | 330 | −12.0% |
| 1980 | 302 | −8.5% |
| 1991 | 284 | −6.0% |
| 2001 | 245 | −13.7% |
| 2011 | 215 | −12.2% |
| 2021 | 210 | −2.3% |
Source: Censuses
