= Radětice (Příbram District) =

- Municipality
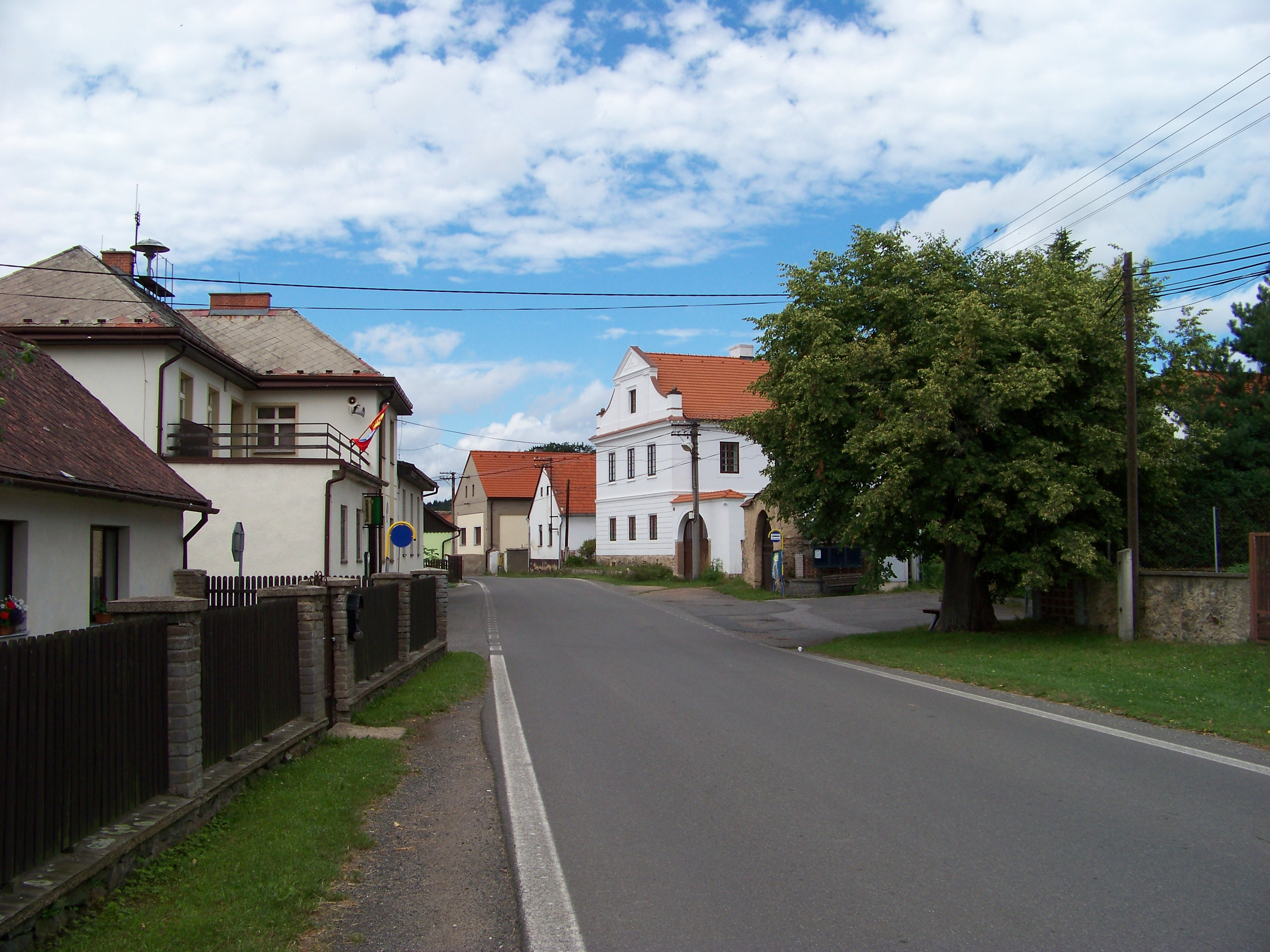
- Centre of Radětice

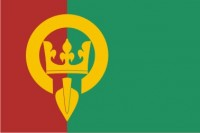
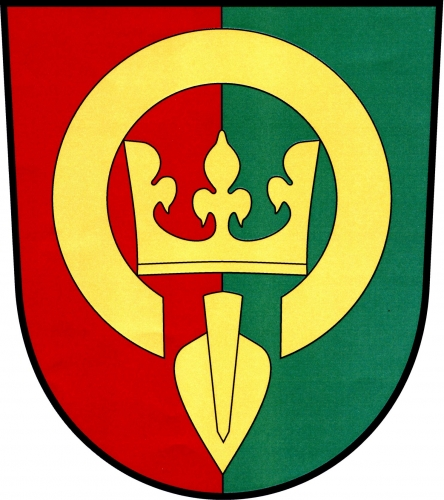
- Flag Coat of arms

- Location in the Czech Republic
- Coordinates: 49°38′24″N 14°4′44″E
- Country: Czech Republic
- Region: Central Bohemian
- District: Příbram
- First mentioned: 1298

Area
  - Total: 4.68 km^{2} (1.81 sq mi)
- Elevation: 526 m (1,726 ft)

Population (2026-01-01)
  - Total: 176
  - Density: 37.6/km^{2} (97.4/sq mi)
- Time zone: UTC+1 (CET)
  - Summer (DST): UTC+2 (CEST)
- Postal code: 262 31
- Website: radetice.pb.cz

Radětice is a municipality and village in Příbram District in the Central Bohemian Region of the Czech Republic. It has about 200 inhabitants.

== Administrative division ==
Radětice consists of two municipal parts (in brackets population according to the 2021 census):

- Radětice (163)
- Palivo (11)

== Etymology ==
The name is derived from the personal name Raďata, meaning "the village of Raďata's people".

== Geography ==
Radětice is located about 7 kilometres (4 mi) southeast of Příbram and 50 km (31 mi) southwest of Prague. It lies in the Benešov Uplands. The highest point is at 575 m (1,886 ft) above sea level.

== History ==
The first written mention of Radětice is from 1298. The village was probably founded in the 13th century.

== Demographics ==
Historical population

Year	Pop.	±%
1869	404	—
1880	427	+5.7%
1890	447	+4.7%
1900	424	−5.1%
1910	352	−17.0%

Year	Pop.	±%
1921	337	−4.3%
1930	294	−12.8%
1950	208	−29.3%
1961	205	−1.4%
1970	192	−6.3%

Year	Pop.	±%
1980	151	−21.4%
1991	146	−3.3%
2001	132	−9.6%
2011	152	+15.2%
2021	174	+14.5%

Source: Censuses

== Transport ==
There are no railways or major roads passing through the municipality.

== Sights ==
Among the protected cultural monuments in the municipality are two rural homesteads, one from the second half of the 18th century and one from the mid-19th century.
