= Horská Kvilda =

- Municipality
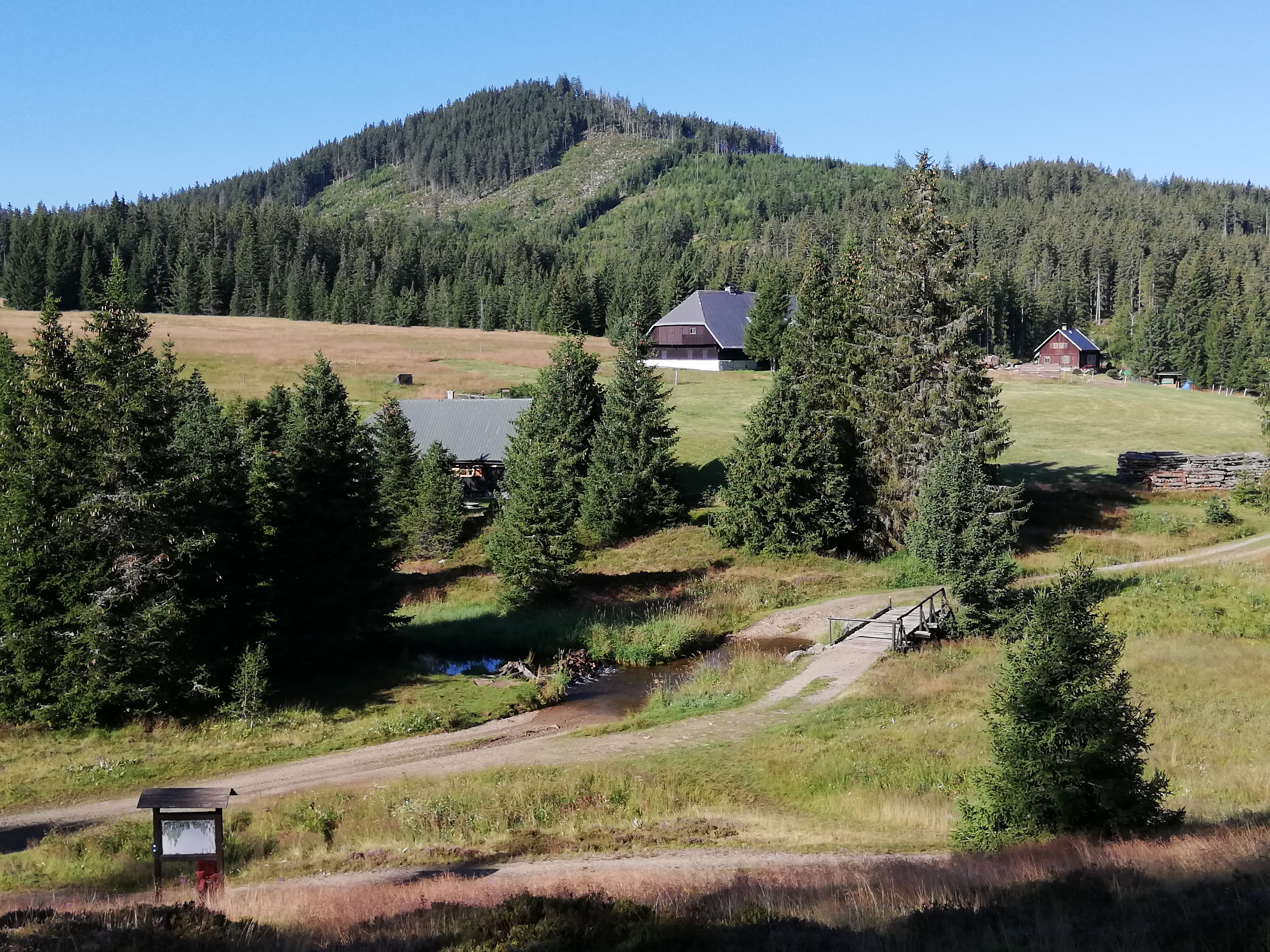
- Houses in the village

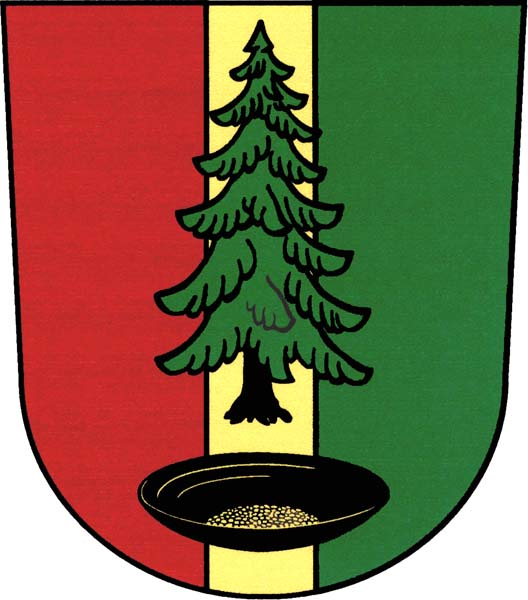
- Flag Coat of arms

- Location in the Czech Republic
- Coordinates: 49°3′28″N 13°33′29″E
- Country: Czech Republic
- Region: Plzeň
- District: Klatovy
- First mentioned: 1577

Area
  - Total: 29.86 km^{2} (11.53 sq mi)
- Elevation: 1,070 m (3,510 ft)

Population (2026-01-01)
  - Total: 69
  - Density: 2.3/km^{2} (6.0/sq mi)
- Time zone: UTC+1 (CET)
  - Summer (DST): UTC+2 (CEST)
- Postal codes: 341 92, 385 01
- Website: www.horskakvilda.eu

Horská Kvilda (German: Innergefild) is a municipality and village in Klatovy District in the Plzeň Region of the Czech Republic. It has about 70 inhabitants. It lies in the Bohemian Forest mountain range.

== Administrative division ==
Horská Kvilda consists of two municipal parts (in brackets population according to the 2021 census):

- Horská Kvilda (49)
- Korýtko (9)

== Etymology ==
The name Kvilda is derived from the Middle High German word gevilde, meaning 'plain' or 'wide meadow'. The prefix Horská (literally 'mountain', but here because of its affiliation to Kašperské Hory) was added to distinguish the settlement from neighbouring Kvilda. In German, the two settlements were distinguished by a prefix denoting inner settlement (Innergefild = Horská Kvilda) and outer settlement (Außergefild = Kvilda).

== Geography ==
Horská Kvilda is located about 42 kilometres (26 mi) southeast of Klatovy and 76 km (47 mi) south of Plzeň. It lies in the Bohemian Forest mountain range and within the Šumava National Park. The highest point is the mountain Antýgl at 1,254 m (4,114 ft) above sea level. The creek Hamerský potok flows through the municipality and joins the Vydra River just outside the municipal territory. The territory of Horská Kvilda is rich in bogs.

=== Climate ===
Horská Kvilda has a subarctic climate (Köppen Dfc). The annual average temperature is 3.6 °C (38.5 °F), the hottest month in July is 13.0 °C (55.4 °F), and the coldest month is −5.0 °C (23.0 °F) in January. The annual precipitation is 845.3 millimetres (33.28 in), of which July is the wettest with 107.1 millimetres (4.22 in), while April is the driest with only 41.3 millimetres (1.63 in). The extreme temperature throughout the year ranged from −35.7 °C (−32.3 °F) on 6 February 2012 to 31.4 °C (88.5 °F) on 8 August 1992.

Climate data for Horská Kvilda, 1991–2020 normals, extremes 1990–present
| Month | Jan | Feb | Mar | Apr | May | Jun | Jul | Aug | Sep | Oct | Nov | Dec | Year |
|---|---|---|---|---|---|---|---|---|---|---|---|---|---|
| Record high °C (°F) | 15.2 (59.4) | 18.8 (65.8) | 19.6 (67.3) | 26.6 (79.9) | 27.7 (81.9) | 30.3 (86.5) | 31.2 (88.2) | 31.4 (88.5) | 28.1 (82.6) | 24.2 (75.6) | 22.4 (72.3) | 13.8 (56.8) | 31.4 (88.5) |
| Mean daily maximum °C (°F) | 0.2 (32.4) | 1.7 (35.1) | 4.9 (40.8) | 10.1 (50.2) | 14.6 (58.3) | 18.1 (64.6) | 19.8 (67.6) | 20.0 (68.0) | 15.1 (59.2) | 10.8 (51.4) | 5.3 (41.5) | 0.9 (33.6) | 10.1 (50.2) |
| Daily mean °C (°F) | −5.0 (23.0) | −4.5 (23.9) | −1.5 (29.3) | 2.7 (36.9) | 8.0 (46.4) | 11.6 (52.9) | 13.0 (55.4) | 12.1 (53.8) | 7.5 (45.5) | 3.8 (38.8) | −0.7 (30.7) | −4.0 (24.8) | 3.6 (38.5) |
| Mean daily minimum °C (°F) | −9.9 (14.2) | −9.9 (14.2) | −6.6 (20.1) | −3.9 (25.0) | 0.3 (32.5) | 3.7 (38.7) | 5.2 (41.4) | 4.6 (40.3) | 1.5 (34.7) | −1.6 (29.1) | −5.4 (22.3) | −8.5 (16.7) | −2.5 (27.5) |
| Record low °C (°F) | −33.5 (−28.3) | −35.7 (−32.3) | −31.2 (−24.2) | −22.0 (−7.6) | −11.7 (10.9) | −8.3 (17.1) | −6.9 (19.6) | −5.0 (23.0) | −10.5 (13.1) | −17.5 (0.5) | −23.4 (−10.1) | −31.5 (−24.7) | −35.7 (−32.3) |
| Average precipitation mm (inches) | 93.0 (3.66) | 81.4 (3.20) | 92.8 (3.65) | 59.9 (2.36) | 101.4 (3.99) | 122.5 (4.82) | 129.7 (5.11) | 111.4 (4.39) | 83.4 (3.28) | 80.8 (3.18) | 69.8 (2.75) | 98.3 (3.87) | 1,124.2 (44.26) |
| Average snowfall cm (inches) | 64.5 (25.4) | 60.1 (23.7) | 48.8 (19.2) | 15.6 (6.1) | 0.6 (0.2) | 0.0 (0.0) | 0.0 (0.0) | 0.0 (0.0) | 0.4 (0.2) | 5.6 (2.2) | 29.8 (11.7) | 56.0 (22.0) | 281.5 (110.8) |
| Average relative humidity (%) | 85.4 | 83.3 | 82.9 | 79.0 | 78.2 | 76.5 | 77.9 | 79.6 | 83.5 | 84.3 | 87.2 | 87.3 | 82.1 |
Source: Czech Hydrometeorological Institute

== History ==
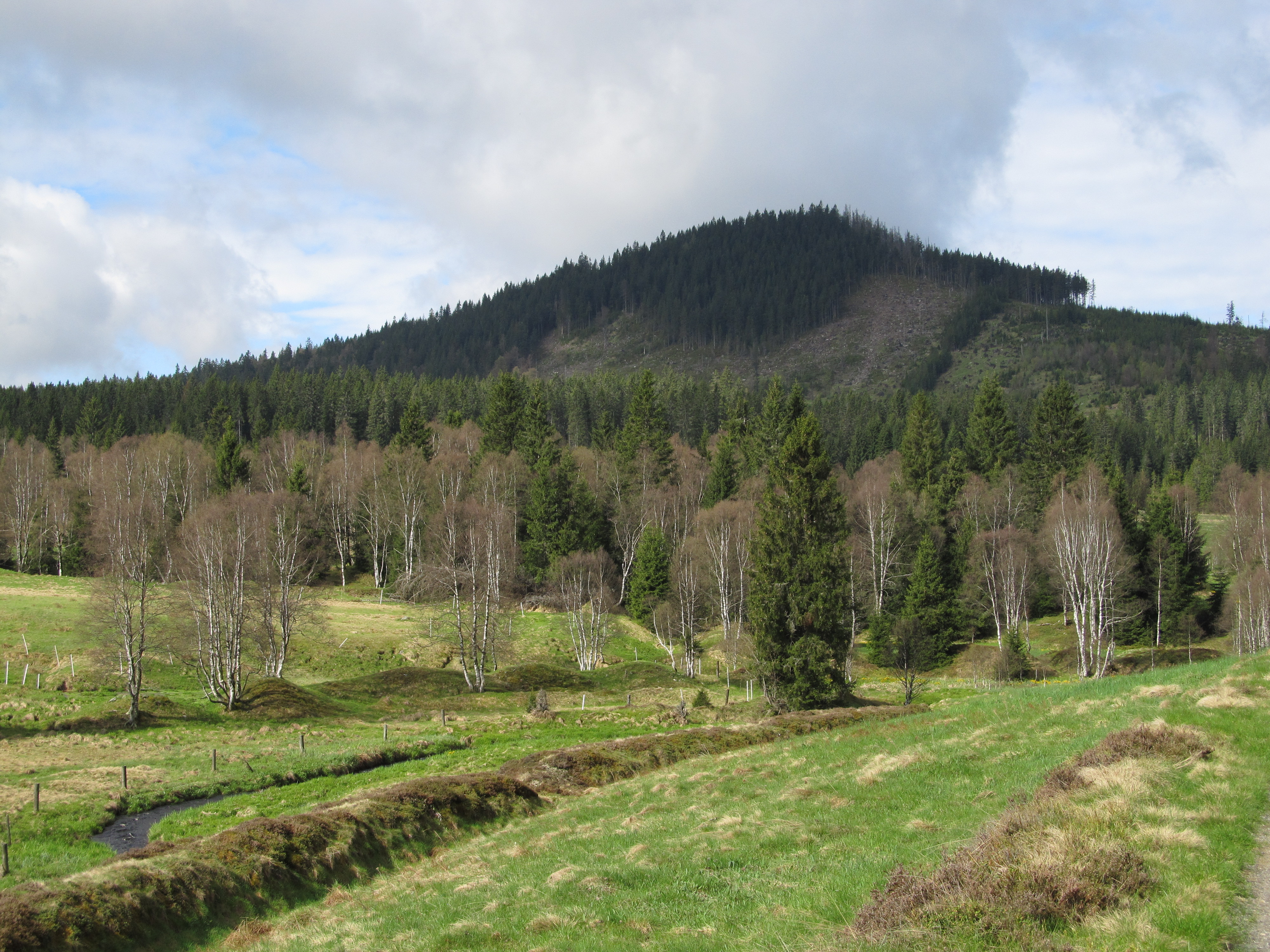
Sejpy around the creek Hamerský potok

The first written mention of Horská Kvilda is from 1577. The village belonged to the Zdíkov estate and shared its owners. From 1846, the estate was owned by the Thun und Hohenstein family.

== Demographics ==
Historical population

| Year | Pop. | ±% |
|---|---|---|
| 1869 | 415 | — |
| 1880 | 397 | −4.3% |
| 1890 | 414 | +4.3% |
| 1900 | 451 | +8.9% |
| 1910 | 432 | −4.2% |

| Year | Pop. | ±% |
|---|---|---|
| 1921 | 506 | +17.1% |
| 1930 | 511 | +1.0% |
| 1950 | 186 | −63.6% |
| 1961 | 53 | −71.5% |
| 1970 | 28 | −47.2% |

| Year | Pop. | ±% |
|---|---|---|
| 1980 | 21 | −25.0% |
| 1991 | 27 | +28.6% |
| 2001 | 50 | +85.2% |
| 2011 | 72 | +44.0% |
| 2021 | 58 | −19.4% |

Source: Censuses

== Transport ==
There are no railways or major roads passing through the municipality.

== Sights ==
Among the protected cultural monuments in the municipality are a rural house from the 19th century, which is a valuable example of mountain folk architecture, and an area with sejpy (small hilly formations created during gold panning in the Middle Ages).
