= Srní =

- Municipality
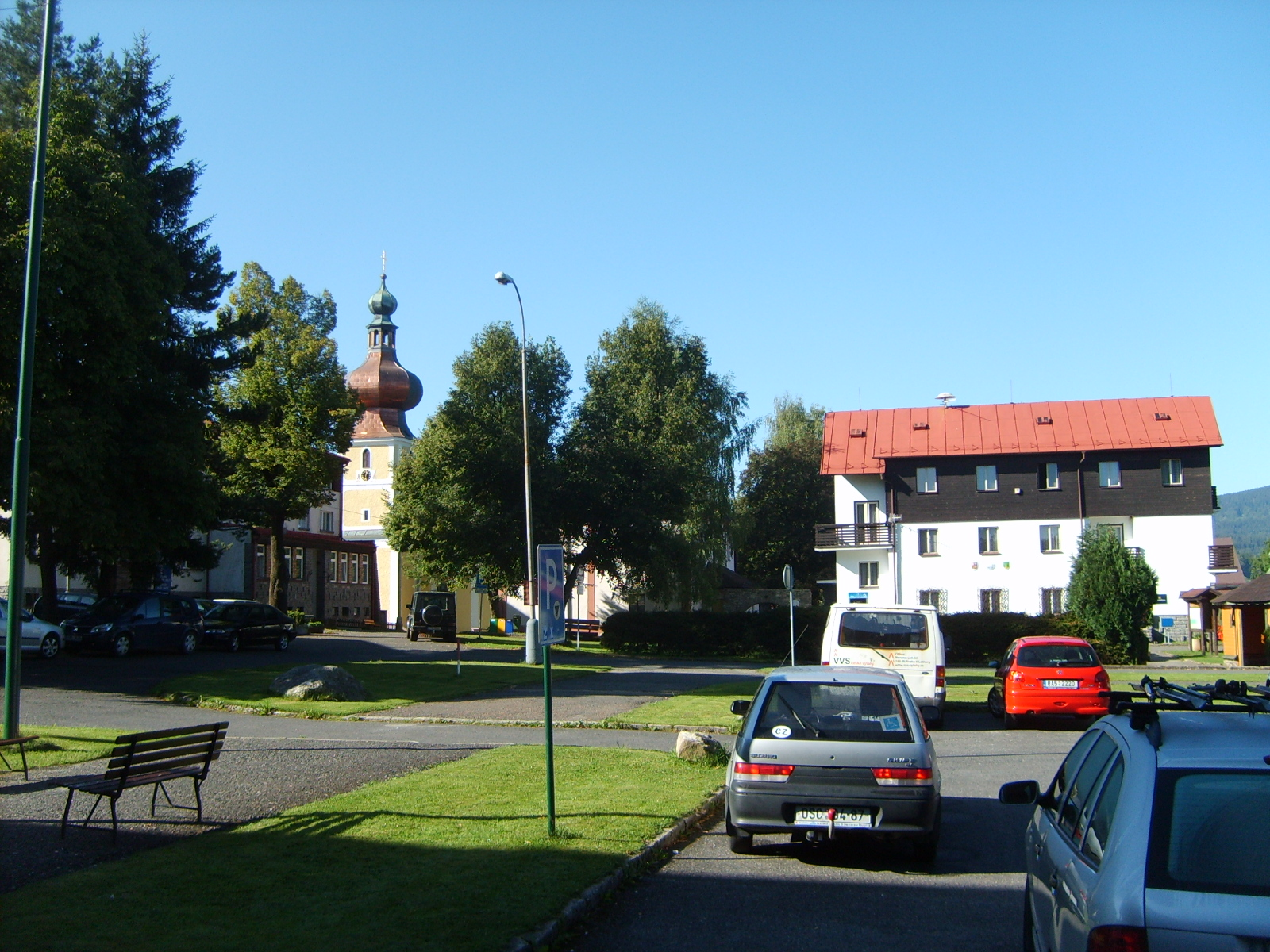
- Centre of Srní

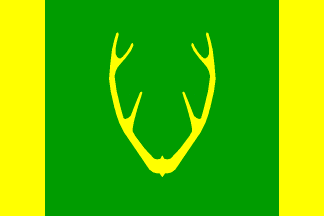
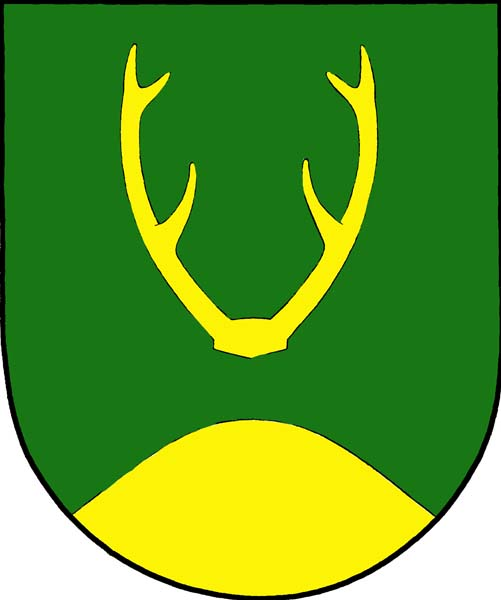
- Flag Coat of arms

- Location in the Czech Republic
- Coordinates: 49°5′14″N 13°28′50″E
- Country: Czech Republic
- Region: Plzeň
- District: Klatovy
- Founded: 1727

Area
  - Total: 33.47 km^{2} (12.92 sq mi)
- Elevation: 858 m (2,815 ft)

Population (2026-01-01)
  - Total: 269
  - Density: 8.04/km^{2} (20.8/sq mi)
- Time zone: UTC+1 (CET)
  - Summer (DST): UTC+2 (CEST)
- Postal code: 341 92
- Website: www.sumava.net/srni/

Srní (German: Rehberg) is a municipality and village in Klatovy District in the Plzeň Region of the Czech Republic. It has about 300 inhabitants.

== Administrative division ==
Srní consists of two municipal parts (in brackets population according to the 2021 census):

- Srní (215)
- Vchynice-Tetov I (6)

== Etymology ==
The village was named Rehberg (literally 'roe deer mountain') in German and later Srní (i.e. "roe deer's") in Czech, after roe deer that were abundant in the area.

== Geography ==
Srní is located about 37 kilometres (23 mi) south of Klatovy and 72 km (45 mi) south of Plzeň. It lies in the Bohemian Forest and in the Šumava National Park. The highest point is the mountain Adamova hora at 1,078 m (3,537 ft) above sea level. The Vydra and Křemelná rivers flow along the municipal borders, until they merge into the Otava River.

== History ==
Srní was founded by Baron Schmiedl in 1726 or 1727 as a lumberjack settlement.

== Demographics ==
Historical population

Year	Pop.	±%
1869	2,088	—
1880	2,145	+2.7%
1890	2,191	+2.1%
1900	2,216	+1.1%
1910	2,136	−3.6%

Year	Pop.	±%
1921	2,070	−3.1%
1930	2,123	+2.6%
1950	415	−80.5%
1961	227	−45.3%
1970	349	+53.7%

Year	Pop.	±%
1980	306	−12.3%
1991	345	+12.7%
2001	343	−0.6%
2011	259	−24.5%
2021	221	−14.7%

Source: Censuses

== Transport ==
There are no railways or major roads passing through the municipality.

== Sights ==
The main landmark of Srní is the Church of the Holy Trinity. It was built in 1804–1805.

An important technical monument is the Vchynice-Tetov Canal. It was constructed to float wood in 1799–1801. It joined the Křemelná and Vydra rivers to get around unnavigable section of the Vydra.

There is a visitor centre with wolf enclosure in the municipality.
