= Joh. Loetz Witwe =

Art glass manufacturer

Johann Loetz Witwe (also known as Joh. Loetz Witwe and Joh. Lötz Witwe) was an art glass manufacturer in Klostermühle (Klášterský Mlýn, now part of Rejštejn) in southwestern Bohemia, Austria-Hungary and then Czechoslovakia. Johann Loetz's works are among the most outstanding examples of Art Nouveau.

== History ==
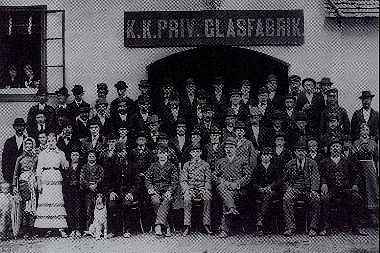
Joh Loetz Witwe staff members

In the Otava valley of the Bohemian Forest was established one of the oldest glass works. In 1850 it was bought by Susanne, widow of Johann Lötz (1778–1844), the founder of the company, former glass cutter and owner of glass factories in Deffernik (Debrník, now part of Železná Ruda), Hurkenthal (Hůrka, now part of Prášily), Annatal (Annín, now part of Dlouhá Ves) and Vogelsang (Podlesí, now part of Kašperské Hory).

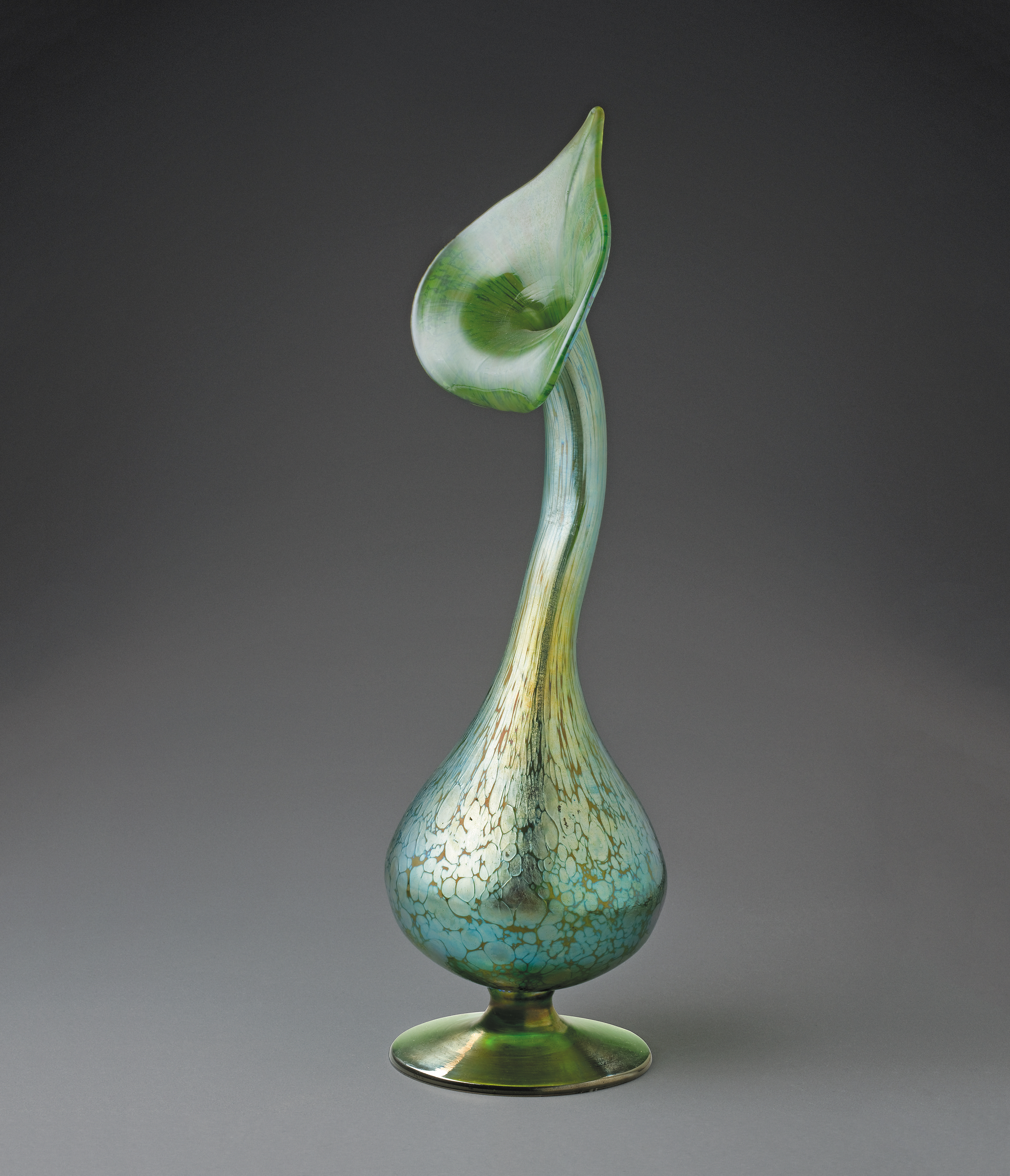
Johann Lötz – Witwe, Klášterský Mlýn (Klostermühle), Vase in the shape of a plant, around 1898, Museum of Decorative Arts in Prague

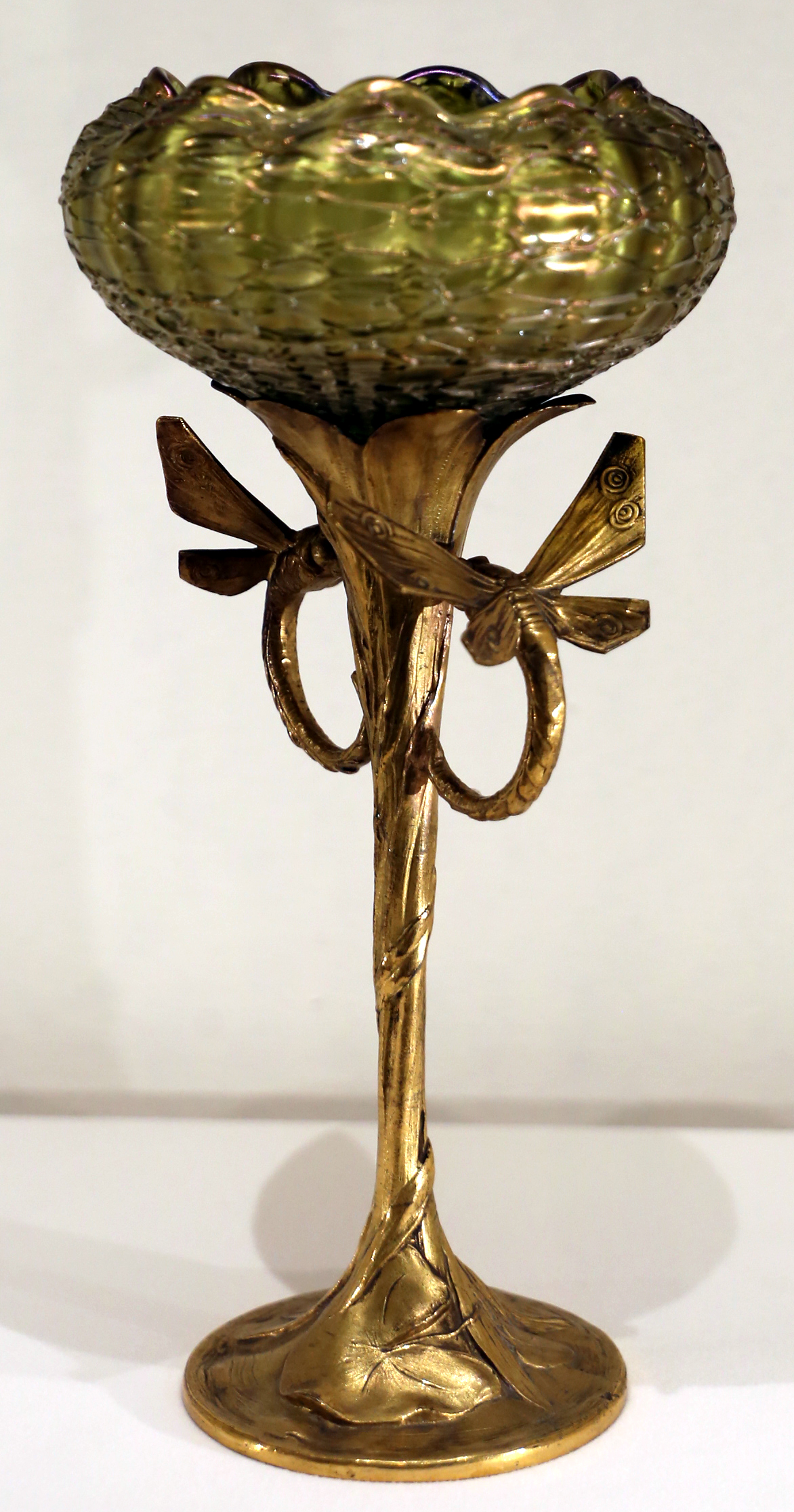
Johann Lötz Witwe Glassworks, pair of vases, ca. 1900.

In 1879 Max Ritter von Spaun, a grandson of Johann Lötz, took over the factory from his grandmother and continued to run it under the old company name, "Joh. Lötz Witwe". The factory had previously been equipped with a significant grinding shop. It was here that heavily cut crystal and cut-through enameled flashing glass were manufactured. The company started to produce the colored glass in the 1860s.

Lötz' glass has always been a specialty because of its purity and fiery colors, and was initially purchased as raw glass by North Bohemian refineries, who refined the same through painting and grinding. Later, due to the high regard of the glass, the company started production of specialty luxury items. The company was the first to manufacture the so-called baroque glass—objects with applied glass decorations—in Austria. Sample warehouses were located in Vienna, Berlin, Hamburg, Paris, London, Brussels, Milan, and Madrid, which soon gave the products a worldwide reputation.

The glass artfully imitated all types of onyx, jasper, carnelian, malachite, lapis, inlaid glass, etc. The luxury glass that emerged from the factory received the highest awards. In the 1888 anniversary exhibition, the Kaiser Franz Josefs Vase, designed by Hofrat Storck and produced by the Lötz company in grey onyx, was unveiled. It was the largest vase that had been blown from glass until then. The company's special products were also presented at most world exhibitions and received the highest awards, including the 1889 Grand Prix Paris, 1888 Prix de Progrès and Honorary Diploma Brussels, as well as honorary diplomas from Vienna, Munich, Antwerp, Chicago, and San Francisco.

Max Ritter von Spaun had received several awards for his services to the glass industry. In 1883 he received the high distinction of being issued a royal warrant of appointment and being allowed to have the imperial eagle in the shield and seal. He was also recognized in 1889 by the award of the Knight's Cross of the Order of Franz Josef; the Belgian Order of Leopold; and the Order of the French Legion of Honor.

Eduard Prochaska, with the company since 1880, served as director. The sons and grandsons of the workers employed in Joh. Lötz's glassworks were the tribe of the factory staff, a testament to the good understanding between the employer and the worker.

Similar to the glasses from Louis Comfort Tiffany, Loetz was able to produce colored glasses with high level of metallic iridescence. The company had contacts with other manufacturers such as J. & L. Lobmeyr and E. Bakalowits Söhne in Vienna and with the Argentor plants. Well-known artists with whom he worked were Josef Hoffmann, Koloman Moser, and the Wiener Werkstätte. The peak of the cooperation happened after 1900. The company was represented and won awards at the Paris World's Fair, and in the Chicago and St. Louis fairs.

The outbreak of the First World War and the collapse of the monarchy brought difficult times for the company. The Second World War and the expulsion of the German-speaking population of Czechoslovakia, and thus a large part of the employees, meant the complete end of the company.

== Literature ==
- Neuwirth, Waltraud; Landesmuseum, Oberösterreichisches (1986). Loetz Austria 1905 - 1918: Glas, glass, verre, vetri; [Katalog zur Loetz-Ausstellung im Oberösterreichischen Landesmuseum, Linz, 20.11.1986 - 31.1.1987] (in German). W. Neuwirth. ISBN 978-3-900282-27-1.
- Ricke, Helmut (1989). Lötz : böhmisches Glas 1880-1940 (in German). Prestel-Verlag. ISBN 978-3-7913-0984-2.
- Ploil, Ernst; Sharp, Toby (2017). Lötz 1900: die Glasfabrik Lötz auf der Pariser Weltausstellung 1900 (in German). Auktionshaus im Kinsky. ISBN 978-3-9503753-2-9.
