= Rejštejn =

- Town
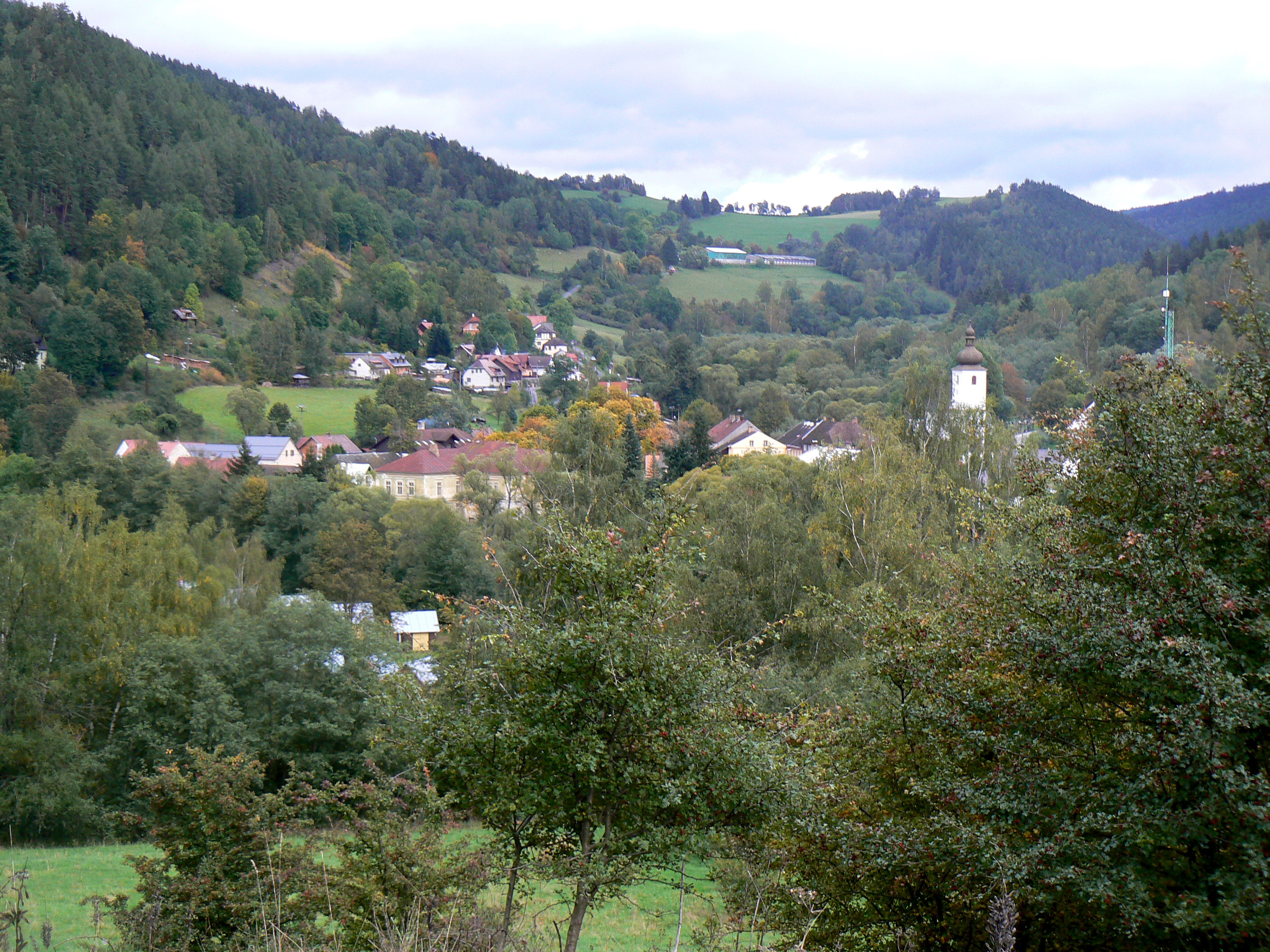
- View of Rejštejn

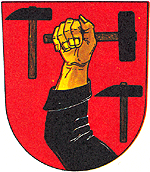
- Coat of arms

- Location in the Czech Republic
- Coordinates: 49°8′7″N 13°30′43″E
- Country: Czech Republic
- Region: Plzeň
- District: Klatovy
- First mentioned: 1337

Government
  - Mayor: Horst Hasenöhrl Jr.

Area
  - Total: 30.44 km^{2} (11.75 sq mi)
- Elevation: 568 m (1,864 ft)

Population (2026-01-01)
  - Total: 234
  - Density: 7.69/km^{2} (19.9/sq mi)
- Time zone: UTC+1 (CET)
  - Summer (DST): UTC+2 (CEST)
- Postal code: 341 92
- Website: www.sumavanet.cz/rejstejn/

Rejštejn (Czech pronunciation: [ˈrɛjʃtɛjn]; German: Reichenstein) is a town in Klatovy District in the Plzeň Region of the Czech Republic. It has about 200 inhabitants, making it one of the least populous towns in the country.

== Administrative division ==
Rejštejn consists of nine municipal parts (in brackets population according to the 2021 census):

- Rejštejn (151)
- Jelenov (6)
- Klášterský Mlýn (33)
- Malý Kozí Hřbet (1)
- Radešov (13)
- Svojše (32)
- Velký Kozí Hřbet (0)
- Velký Radkov (9)
- Zhůří (0)

== Etymology ==
The original German name Reichenstein was created from am reichen Stein (meaning 'at the rich rock') and refers to the gold mining in the area. The Czech name was created by transcription of the German name.

== Geography ==
Rejštejn is located about 32 kilometres (20 mi) southeast of Klatovy and 66 km (41 mi) south of Plzeň. It lies mostly in the Bohemian Forest mountain range and in the Šumava National Park, only the northern part of the municipal territory lies in the Bohemian Forest Foothills. The highest point is the mountain Huťská hora at 1,187 m (3,894 ft) above sea level. The Otava River is formed by the confluence of the Vydra and Křemelná rivers, located at the western municipal border, and then flows through the town proper.

== History ==
The first written mention of Rejštejn is from 1337. Originally, it was administratively considered part of Kašperské Hory. Thanks to gold mining in the area, the settlement grew. In 1584, Rejštejn was promoted by Emperor Rudolf II to a royal mining town and gained independence. In the 17th century, mining ended and the development of the town stopped.

A new impulse for the development of the town was the establishment of glass factories. In 1836, the glass factory of Jan Eisner was established in Klášterský Mlýn. The second notable factory in Klášterský Mlýn was the art glass manufacturer Joh. Loetz Witwe. As a result of the economic crisis and the world wars, glassmaking ended in 1947.

== Demographics ==
Historical population

Year	Pop.	±%
1869	2,103	—
1880	2,226	+5.8%
1890	2,372	+6.6%
1900	2,253	−5.0%
1910	2,252	−0.0%

Year	Pop.	±%
1921	2,201	−2.3%
1930	2,255	+2.5%
1950	977	−56.7%
1961	712	−27.1%
1970	530	−25.6%

Year	Pop.	±%
1980	410	−22.6%
1991	305	−25.6%
2001	270	−11.5%
2011	236	−12.6%
2021	245	+3.8%

Source: Censuses

== Transport ==
There are no railways or major roads passing through the municipal territory.

== Sights ==
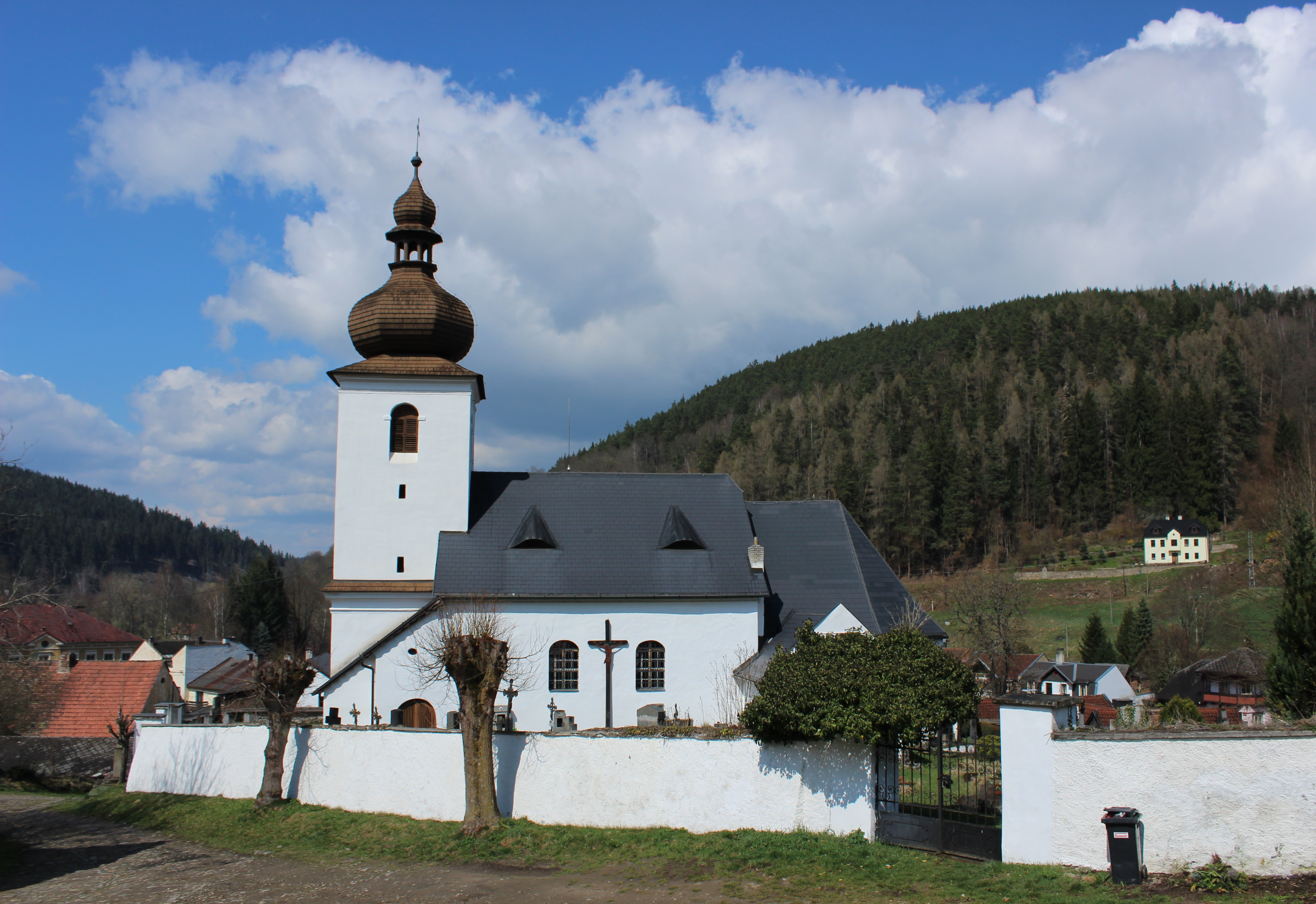
Church of Saint Bartholomew

The main landmark of Rejštejn is the Church of Saint Bartholomew. It is originally a late Gothic church from the turn of the 14th and 15th centuries, rebuilt in the Baroque style in the 18th century.

A technical monument is the hydroelectric power plant Čeňkova Pila, which dates from 1912. Inside there is the original technical equipment and it is still in use today.
