= Modrava =

- Municipality
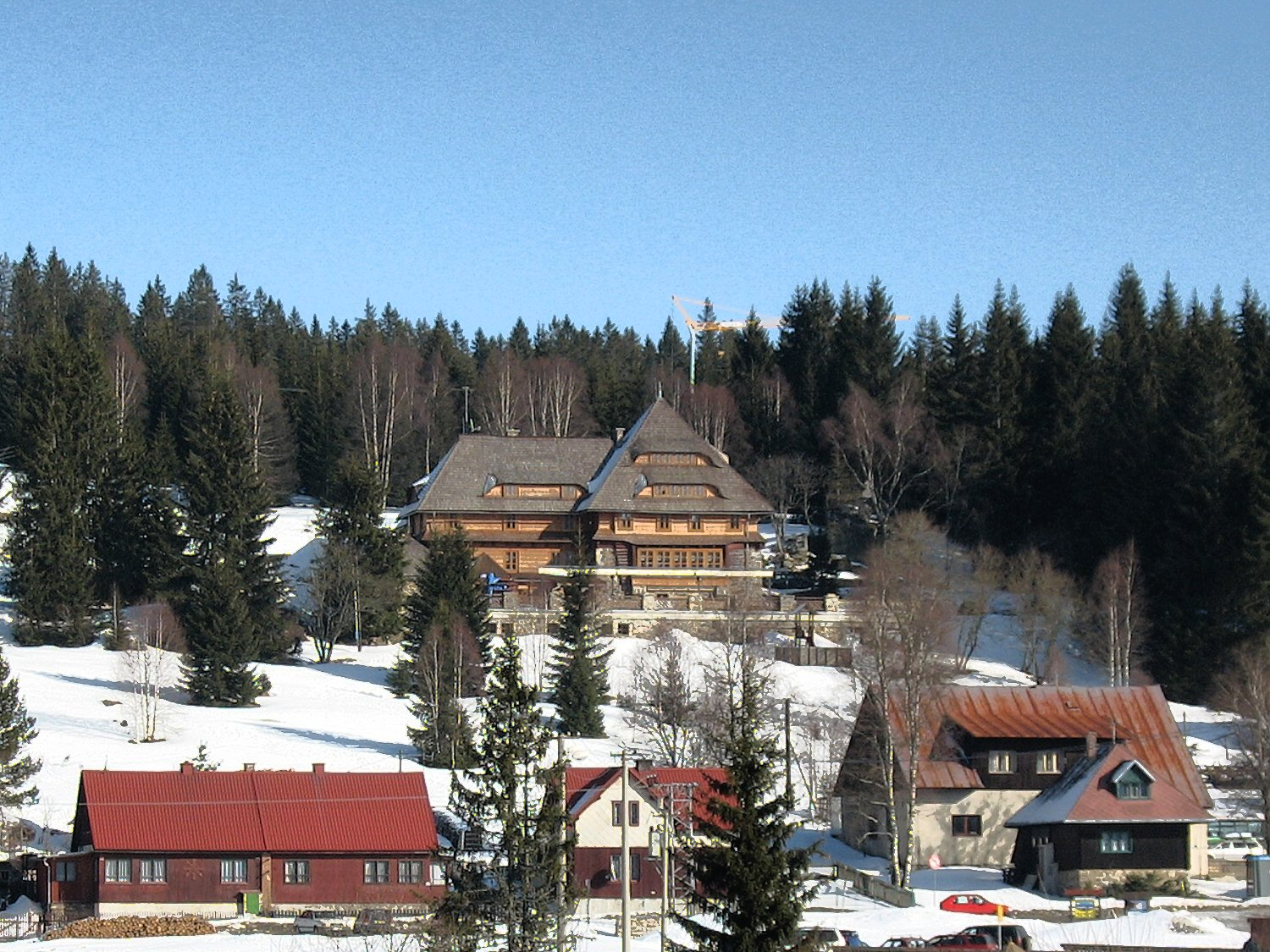
- Klostermann Hut

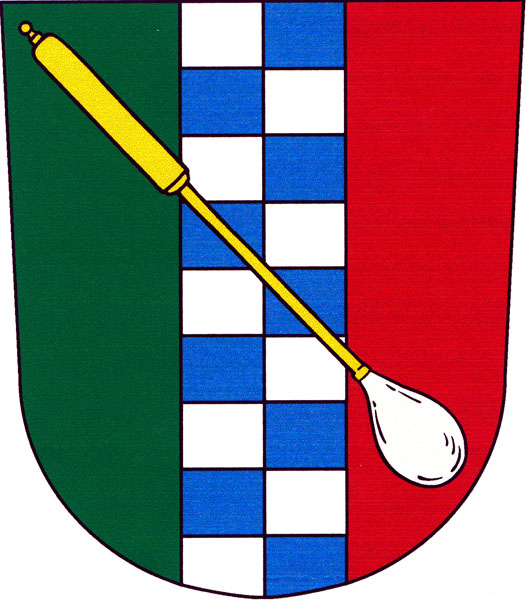
- Flag Coat of arms

- Location in the Czech Republic
- Coordinates: 49°1′27″N 13°29′58″E
- Country: Czech Republic
- Region: Plzeň
- District: Klatovy
- First mentioned: 1614

Area
  - Total: 81.64 km^{2} (31.52 sq mi)
- Elevation: 985 m (3,232 ft)

Population (2026-01-01)
  - Total: 103
  - Density: 1.26/km^{2} (3.27/sq mi)
- Time zone: UTC+1 (CET)
  - Summer (DST): UTC+2 (CEST)
- Postal code: 341 92
- Website: www.sumavanet.cz/modrava/

Modrava (German: Mader) is a municipality and village in Klatovy District in the Plzeň Region of the Czech Republic. It has about 100 inhabitants.

== Administrative division ==
Modrava consists of two municipal parts (in brackets population according to the 2021 census):

- Modrava (56)
- Filipova Huť (33)

== Geography ==
Modrava is located about 44 kilometres (27 mi) south of Klatovy and 78 km (48 mi) south of Plzeň, on the border with Germany. It lies in the Bohemian Forest and within the Šumava National Park. The highest point of the municipality and the entire Plzeň Region is the mountain Velká Mokrůvka at 1,370 m (4,490 ft) above sea level. The Vydra River, which forms the Otava River after the confluence with the Křemelná, originates here.

The village of Filipova Huť is located at 1,093 m (3,586 ft) above sea level, making it the highest Czech settlement.

== History ==
The first written mention of Modrava is from 1614. From 1757, Modrava developed as a fishing and hunting settlement. Filipova Huť was founded in 1785 as a glass workers settlement and named after Count Philip Kinsky, but the glass factory did not prosper and the village became a lumber settlement. The area of Modrava and Filipova Huť was owned by the Kinsky family until 1799, when they sold it to the Schwarzenberg family.

== Demographics ==
Historical population

Year	Pop.	±%
1869	411	—
1880	408	−0.7%
1890	441	+8.1%
1900	422	−4.3%
1910	415	−1.7%

Year	Pop.	±%
1921	279	−32.8%
1930	514	+84.2%
1950	74	−85.6%
1961	143	+93.2%
1970	117	−18.2%

Year	Pop.	±%
1980	83	−29.1%
1991	53	−36.1%
2001	49	−7.5%
2011	58	+18.4%
2021	89	+53.4%

Source: Censuses

== Transport ==
There are no railways or major roads passing through the municipality.

== Sport ==
In winter, Modrava is known for cross-country skiing. The main cross-country trail in the Bohemian Forest, the so-called Šumava Highway, runs through Modrava. During the summer, the municipality is popular for hiking and cycling.

== Sights ==
A cultural monument is the Klostermann Hut. It was built by the Czech Tourist Club in 1924 according to the design by Bohuslav Fuchs and named after Karel Klostermann, a writer connected with the region.
