= Hartmanice (Klatovy District) =

- Town
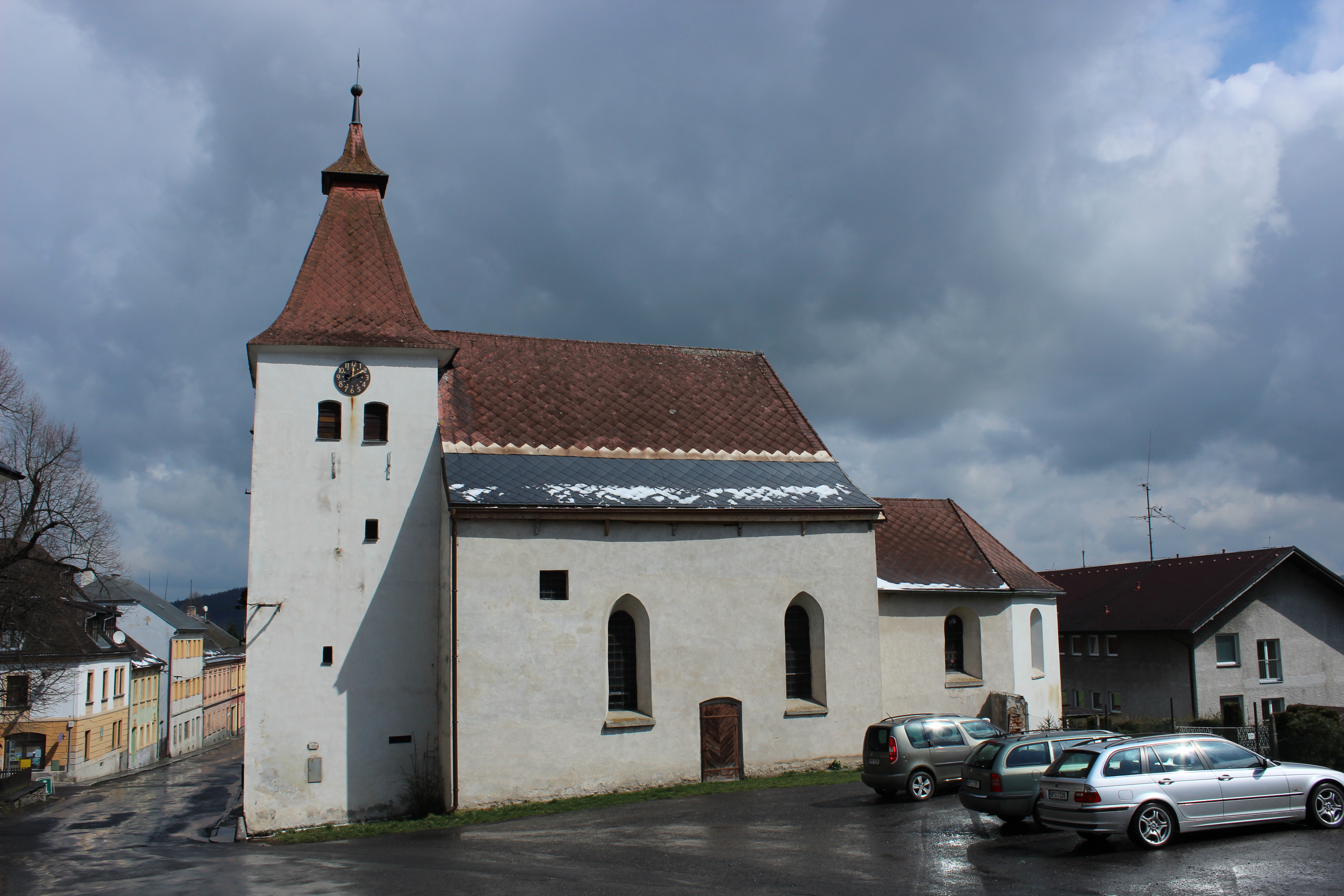
- Church of Saint Catherine

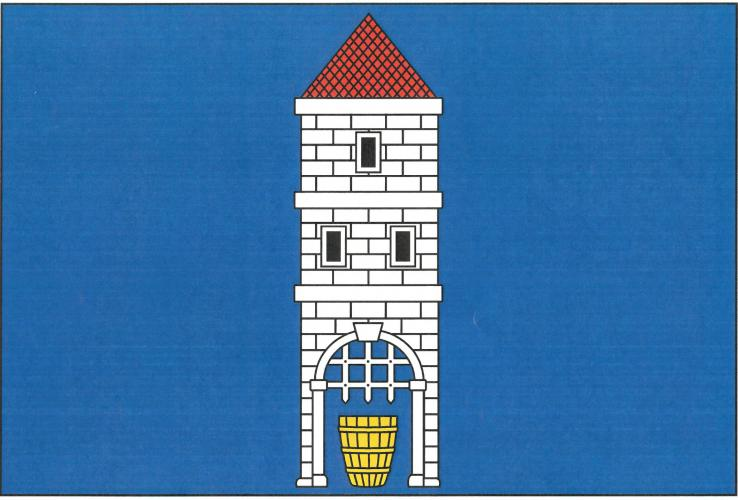
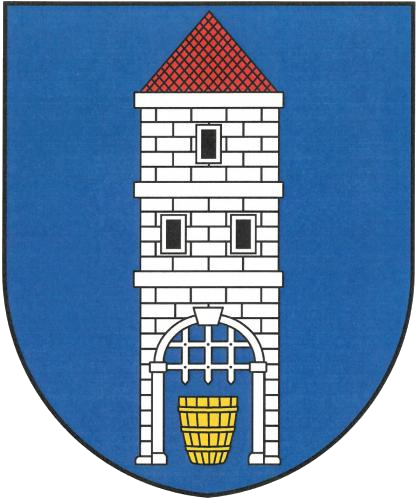
- Flag Coat of arms

- Location in the Czech Republic
- Coordinates: 49°10′10″N 13°27′22″E
- Country: Czech Republic
- Region: Plzeň
- District: Klatovy
- First mentioned: 1315

Government
  - Mayor: Pavel Valdman

Area
  - Total: 62.20 km^{2} (24.02 sq mi)
- Elevation: 712 m (2,336 ft)

Population (2026-01-01)
  - Total: 929
  - Density: 14.9/km^{2} (38.7/sq mi)
- Time zone: UTC+1 (CET)
  - Summer (DST): UTC+2 (CEST)
- Postal codes: 341 42, 342 01
- Website: www.muhartmanice.cz

Hartmanice (Czech pronunciation: [ˈɦartmaɲɪtsɛ]; German: Hartmanitz) is a town in Klatovy District in the Plzeň Region of the Czech Republic. It has about 900 inhabitants.

== Administrative division ==
Hartmanice consists of 23 municipal parts (in brackets population according to the 2021 census):

- Hartmanice (578)
- Chlum (46)
- Dobrá Voda (16)
- Dolejší Krušec (11)
- Dolejší Těšov (44)
- Hořejší Krušec (21)
- Hořejší Těšov (11)
- Javoří (11)
- Keply (31)
- Kochánov (1)
- Kříženec (0)
- Kundratice (48)
- Loučová (8)
- Malý Radkov (5)
- Mochov (1)
- Palvinov (15)
- Prostřední Krušec (7)
- Štěpanice (2)
- Světlá (22)
- Trpěšice (0)
- Vatětice (2)
- Vlastějov (33)
- Zálužice (3)

== Etymology ==
The name was derived from the personal name Hartman, meaning "the village of Hartman's people".

== Geography ==
Hartmanice is located about 27 kilometres (17 mi) southeast of Klatovy and 62 km (39 mi) south of Plzeň. It lies on the border between the Bohemian Forest Foothills and Bohemian Forest mountain range. The highest point is the mountain Křemelná at 1,125 m (3,691 ft) above sea level. The southern part of the municipal territory lies in the Šumava National Park.

The territory of Hartmanice is rich in watercourses. The Otava River is formed by the confluence of the Vydra and Křemelná rivers, located in the southeastern tip of the municipal territory, and then briefly flows along the eastern municipal border. The upper course of the Ostružná River crosses the western part of the municipal territory. The Volšovka Stream originates here and then flows across the territory from west to northeast.

== History ==
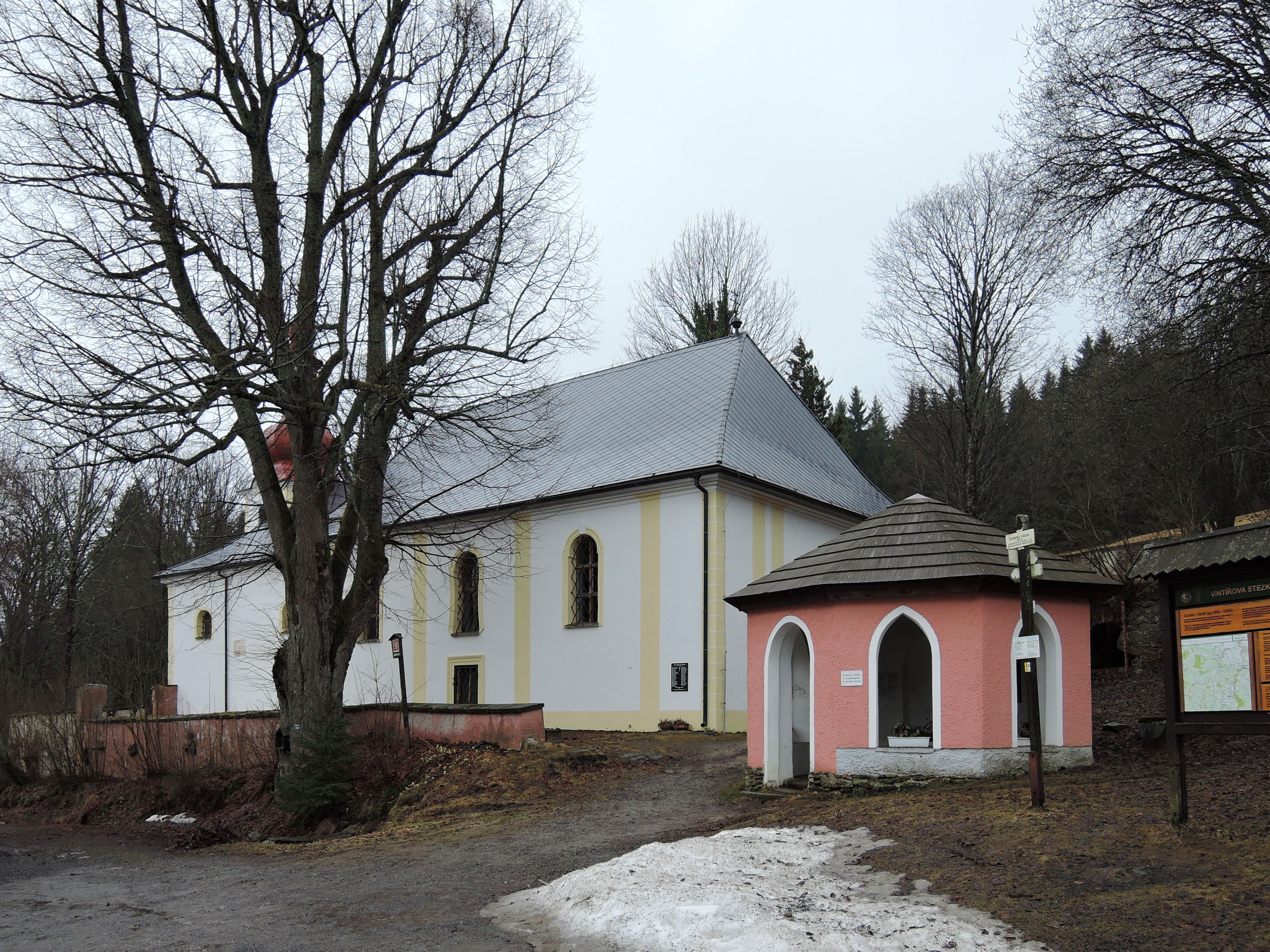
Church of Saint Gunther

The first written mention of Hartmanice is from 1315. Thanks to gold mining in the area, the settlement grew rapidly. From 1603 until the establishment of a sovereign municipality in 1848, it was a property of the town of Sušice. In 1607, Hartmanice was promoted to a market town. Until the Thirty Years' War, the population was predominantly Czech, but during the war the market town and the gold mines were abandoned. After the war, Hartmanice was resettled by Germans.

In 1938, the area was annexed by Nazi Germany. After World War II, the German-speaking population was expelled and new settlers came from Volhynia and Slovakia. A military training area was established next to Hartmanice in 1952, which slowed down its development. The military area was abolished in 1991. In 1992, Hartmanice obtained the town status.

== Demographics ==
Historical population

Year	Pop.	±%
1869	4,266	—
1880	4,729	+10.9%
1890	4,646	−1.8%
1900	4,535	−2.4%
1910	4,136	−8.8%

Year	Pop.	±%
1921	3,766	−8.9%
1930	3,757	−0.2%
1950	1,427	−62.0%
1961	1,496	+4.8%
1970	1,336	−10.7%

Year	Pop.	±%
1980	1,199	−10.3%
1991	1,234	+2.9%
2001	1,161	−5.9%
2011	1,037	−10.7%
2021	916	−11.7%

Source: Censuses

== Transport ==
There are no railways or major roads passing through the municipal territory.

== Sights ==
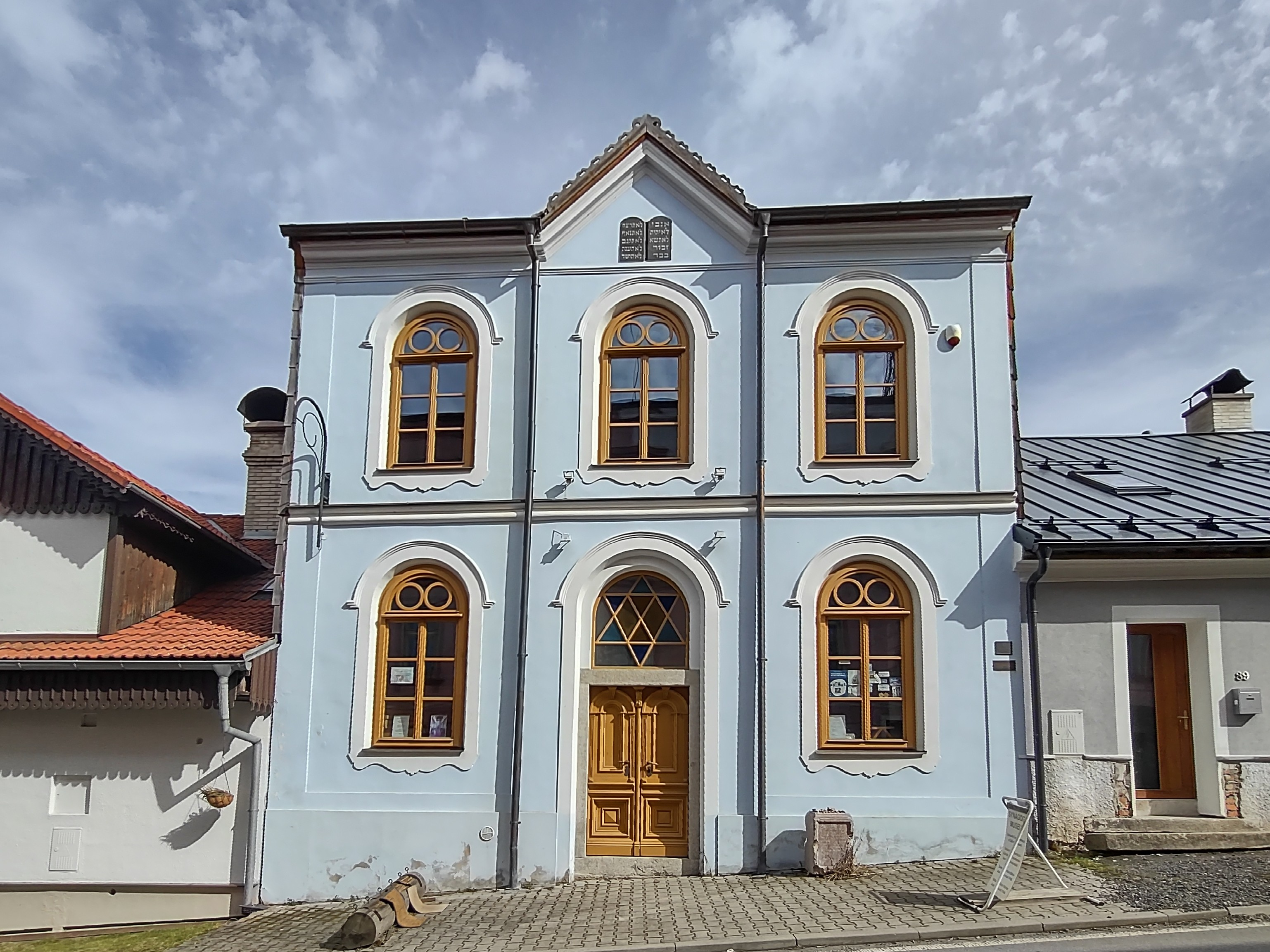
Mountain Synagogue

The main landmark of Hartmanice is the Church of Saint Catherine. It is a late Gothic church from the 14th century, modified in the Baroque style in the 18th and 19th centuries.

The former synagogue was built in 1884 at the latest. It was built in the historicist style with Romanesque and Baroque elements. Today there is an exhibition commemorating the coexistence of Czechs, Germans and Jews in the Bohemian Forest area.

The Church of Saint Gunther is located in Dobrá Voda. It was built in the Baroque style in 1754 on the site of a wooden chapel, which was first documented in 1620. The tower was added in 1777. In 1820, a small octagonal chapel was built above the spring next to the church.

== Twin towns – sister cities ==
Hartmanice is twinned with:

- Affoltern im Emmental, Switzerland
- Rinchnach, Germany
