= Karel Klostermann =

Czech-Austrian writer

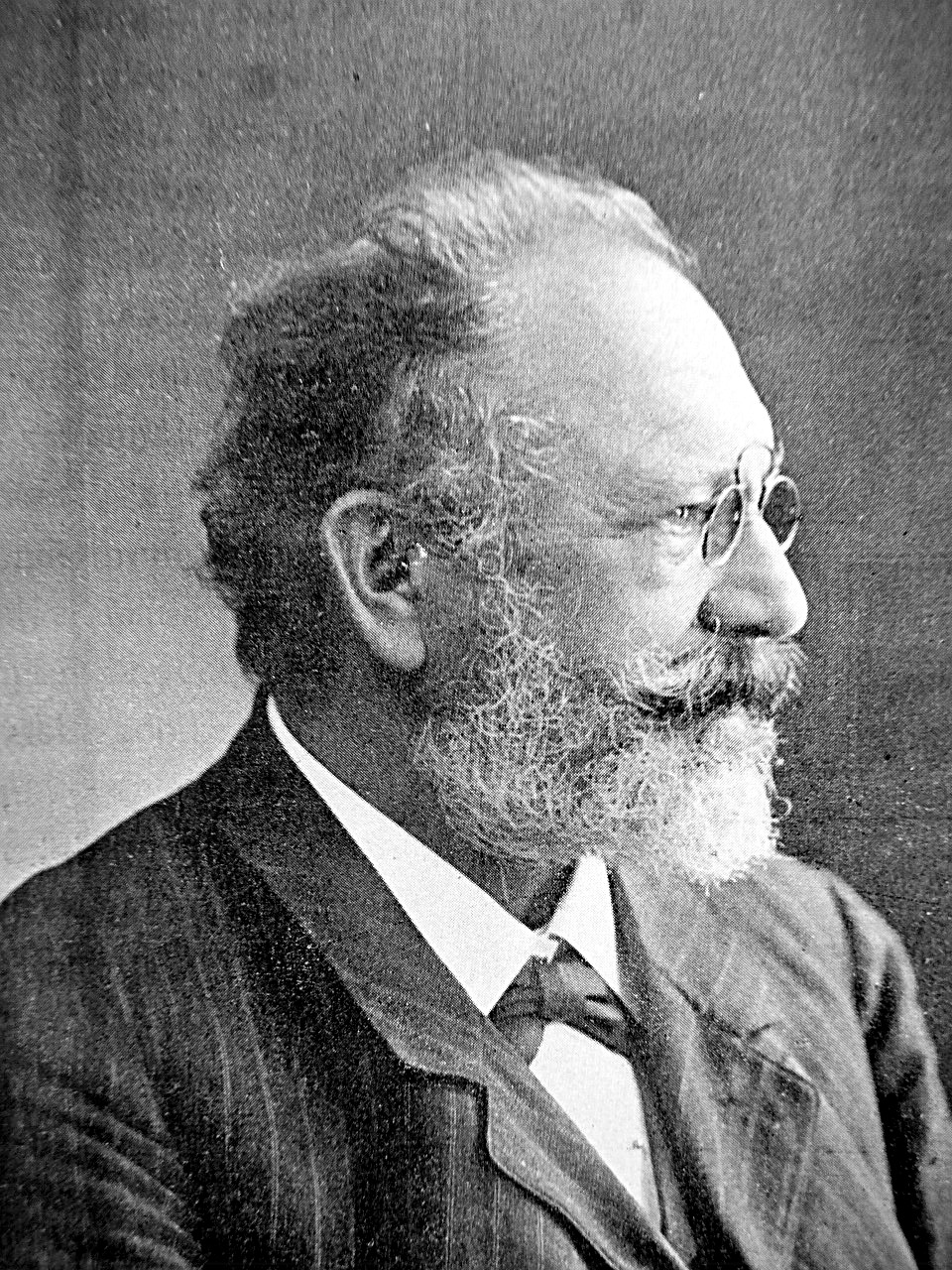
Karel Klostermann in 1908

Karel Klostermann (German: Karl Klostermann; 13 February 1848 – 17 July 1923) was a Czech-German writer. He wrote under the alias Faustin.

== Biography ==
Klostermann was born on 13 February 1848 in Haag am Hausruck, Upper Austria. From 1857 to 1865, he went to school in Písek in what is now the Czech Republic. He studied medicine until 1869 in Vienna, and was later active as a teacher of German and French at the German high school in Plzeň. He first wrote his works in German; later he turned to the Czech language and wrote novellas about the inhabitants of the middle Bohemian Forest. This can be found in the collection V srdci šumavských hvozdů ("In the heart of the Bohemian Forest"). Some of his novellas are set in and around the town of Kašperské Hory.

Klostermann died on 17 July 1923 in Štěkeň, at the age of 75.

== Selected works ==
- Ze světa lesních samot (From the world of forest solitude) – 1891
- Syn svobodného soudce (The son of the free judge)
- Pěst v příbězích (Fist in stories)

== Honours ==
Klostermann Hut in Modrava was named after Karel Klostermann.
