= Vydra (river) =

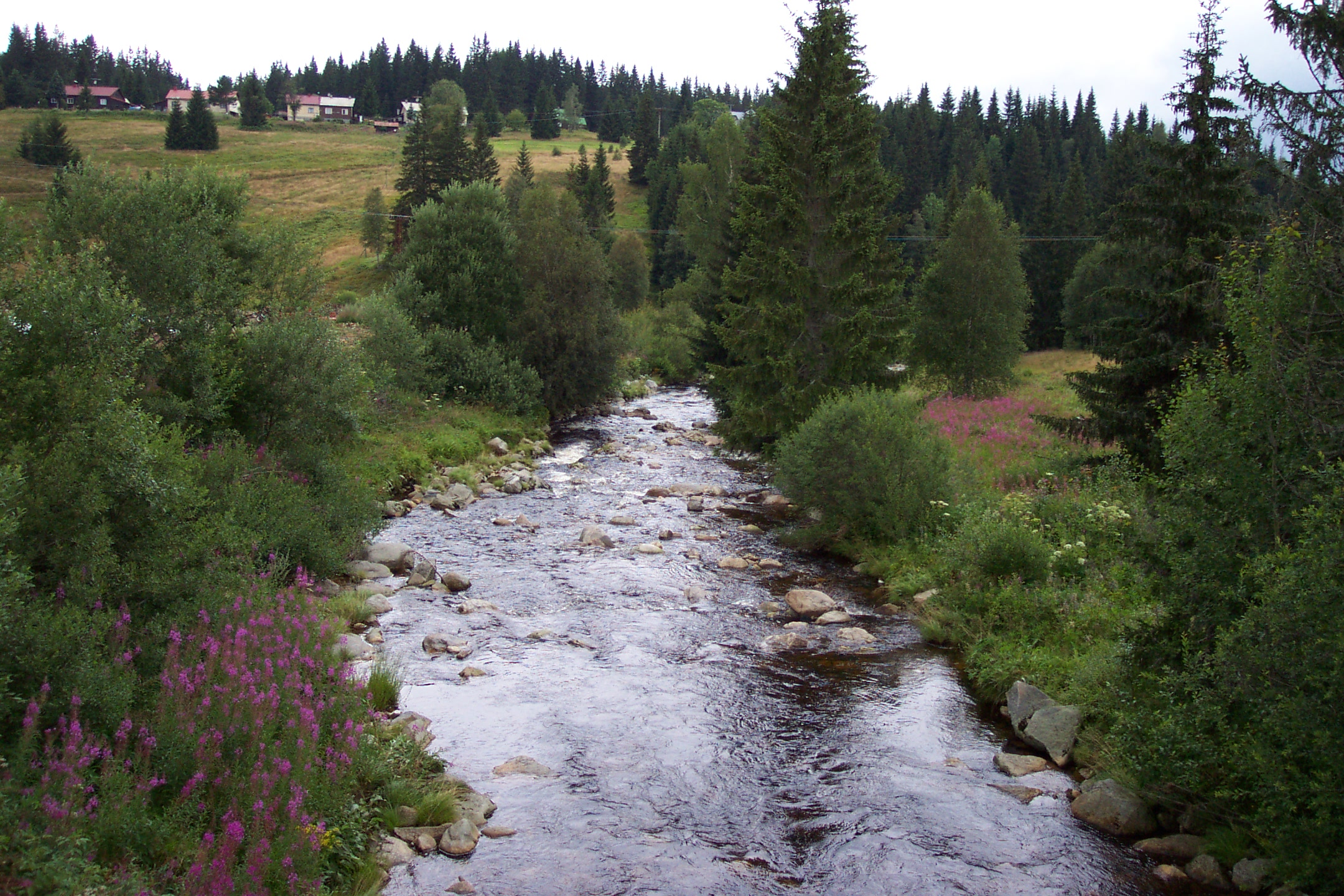
- The Vydra in Modrava

Location
- Country: Czech Republic
- Region: Plzeň

Physical characteristics
- Source
  - location: Modrava, Bohemian Forest
  - coordinates: 48°56′29″N 13°29′47″E
  - elevation: 1,210 m (3,970 ft)
- Mouth
  - location: Otava
  - coordinates: 49°6′35″N 13°29′32″E
  - elevation: 627 m (2,057 ft)
- Length: 23.7 km (14.7 mi)
- Basin size: 146.2 km^{2} (56.4 sq mi)
- Discharge
  - average: 4.13 m^{3}/s (146 cu ft/s) near estuary

Basin features
- Progression: Otava→ Vltava→ Elbe→ North Sea

The Vydra (German: Widra) is a river in the Czech Republic. It flows through the Plzeň Region. It is the upper course of the Otava, but usually is considered a separate river. Until its confluence with the Křemelná, when it further continues as the Otava, the Vydra is 23.7 km (14.7 mi) long.

== Etymology ==
In Czech, the name literally means 'otter'. The river was named after the Eurasian otters that occurred by the river.

== Characteristic ==
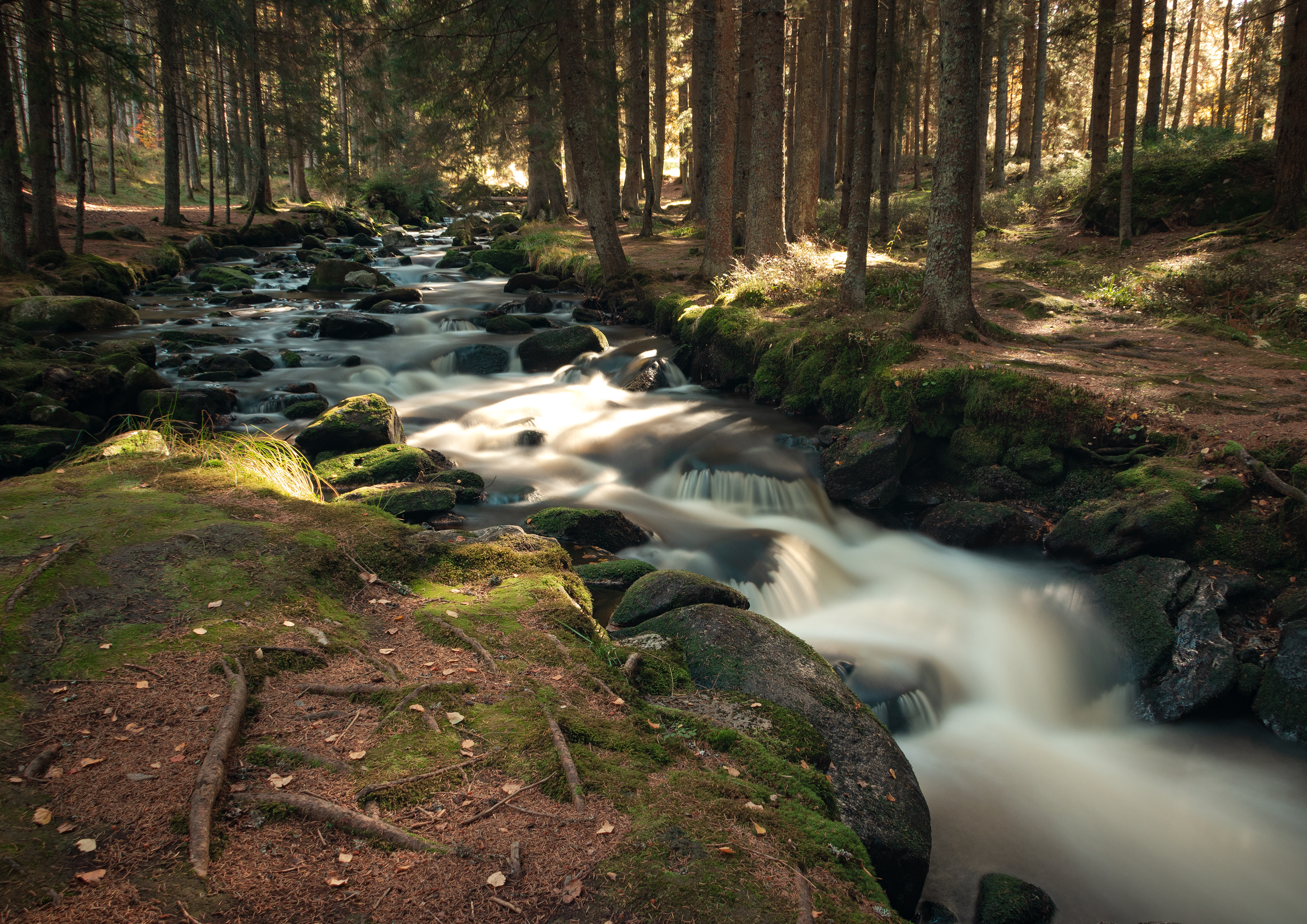
Typical river bed of the Vydra

From a water management point of view, the Otava and Vydra are two different rivers with separate numbering of river kilometres. The Vydra is formed by the gradual confluence of several creek with their own names, but the main sources are taken as an integral part of the Vydra. The Vydra originates in the territory of Modrava in the Bohemian Forest mountain range, on the northern slope of the Lusen Mountain (Czech: Luzný), on the Czech–German state border, at an elevation of 1,210 m (3,970 ft). The main source is called Luzenský potok; after its confluence with the Březnický potok, it continues under the name Modravský potok. In the centre of the Modrava village, after its confluence with the Filipohuťský potok and Roklanský potok, the river continues further northward as the Vydra.

The Vydra flows to Hartmanice, where it merges with the Křemelná River at an elevation of 627 m (2,057 ft) and continues as the Otava. Its total length is 23.7 km (14.7 mi). From the confluence of the Modravský potok and Roklanský potok, the river is 11.8 km (7.3 mi) long and is designated as a "significant watercourse" according to the law that defines the care of the water course. The drainage basin of the Vydra has an area of 146.2 km^{2} (56.4 sq mi). The average discharge at its mouth is 4.13 m3/s.

The longest tributaries of the Vydra are:

Tributary	Length (km)	Side
Roklanský potok	14.7	left
Hamerský potok	8.9	right
Hrádecký potok	5.6	left

== Course ==
In addition to Modrava, the river flows through the municipal territories of Srní and Rejštejn until it reaches the southeastern tip of the territory of Hartmanice, where it merges with the Křemelná River.

== Tourism ==
The entire course of the river is located within the Šumava National Park. The valley of the river near Srní is among the most visited places of the national park. An educational trail leads through the valley.

The Vydra is suitable for river tourism. A 4.8 km (3.0 mi) long section is navigable, but it is suitable only for experienced paddlers because of the numerous rapids and cascades.

On the lower course of the river is a small hydroelectric power station. It was built in 1937–1942. The power plant included an exhibition about the use of energy resources in the Bohemian Forest, but it was closed in 2021.

== See also ==
- List of rivers of the Czech Republic
