= Ze světa lesních samot =

Czech novel by Karel Klostermann (1891)

Ze světa lesních samot is a Czech novel, written by Karel Klostermann. It was first published in 1891.
