= Horní Vltavice =

- Municipality
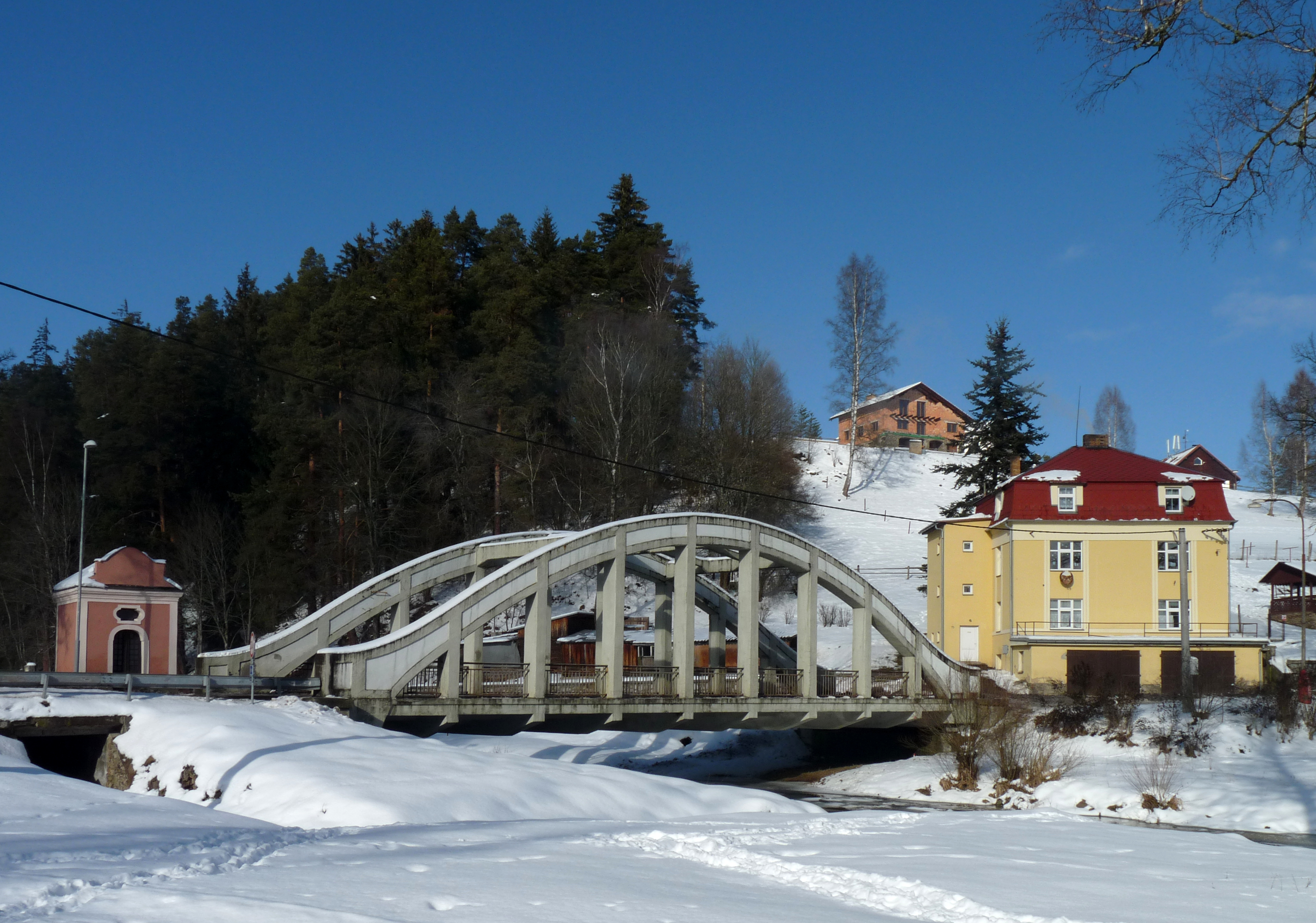
- Bridge over the Teplá Vltava river

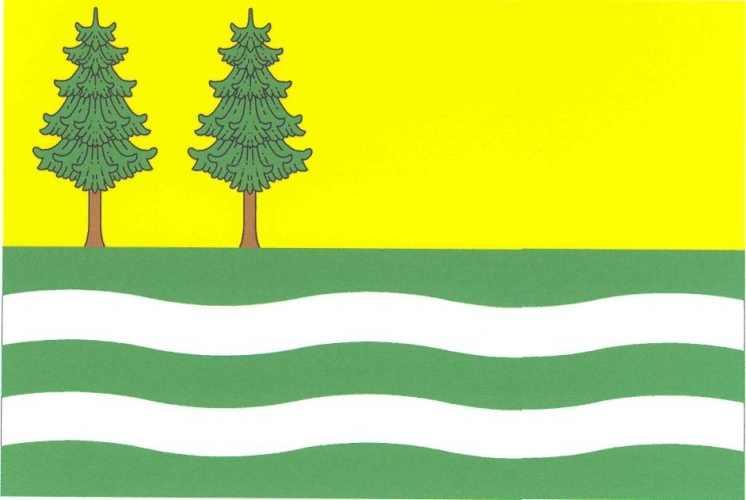
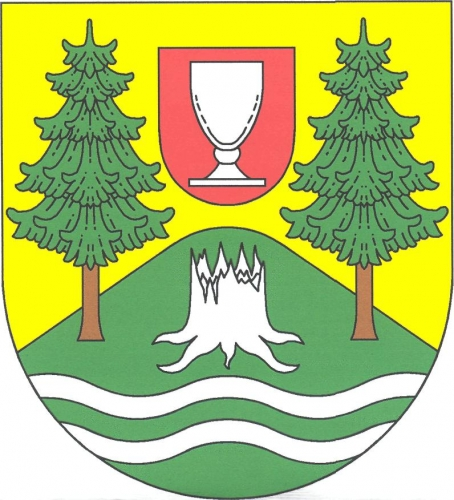
- Flag Coat of arms

- Location in the Czech Republic
- Coordinates: 48°57′26″N 13°45′31″E
- Country: Czech Republic
- Region: South Bohemian
- District: Prachatice
- First mentioned: 1359

Area
  - Total: 58.80 km^{2} (22.70 sq mi)
- Elevation: 805 m (2,641 ft)

Population (2026-01-01)
  - Total: 350
  - Density: 6.0/km^{2} (15/sq mi)
- Time zone: UTC+1 (CET)
  - Summer (DST): UTC+2 (CEST)
- Postal code: 384 91
- Website: www.hornivltavice.cz

Horní Vltavice (German: Obermoldau) is a municipality and village in Prachatice District in the South Bohemian Region of the Czech Republic. It has about 400 inhabitants.

Horní Vltavice lies approximately 17 kilometres (11 mi) west of Prachatice, 50 km (31 mi) west of České Budějovice, and 133 km (83 mi) south of Prague.

== Administrative division ==
Horní Vltavice consists of six municipal parts (in brackets population according to the 2021 census):

- Horní Vltavice (315)
- Březová Lada (0)
- Polka (0)
- Račí (24)
- Slatina (0)
- Žlíbky (0)

== Demographics ==
Historical population
Year	Pop.	±%
1869	1,499	—
1880	1,576	+5.1%
1890	1,446	−8.2%
1900	1,346	−6.9%
1910	1,214	−9.8%
1921	1,195	−1.6%
1930	1,247	+4.4%
1950	319	−74.4%
1961	329	+3.1%
1970	423	+28.6%
1980	413	−2.4%
1991	372	−9.9%
2001	390	+4.8%
2011	357	−8.5%
2021	339	−5.0%
Source: Censuses
