= Bohemian Forest =

Mountain range in Germany and the Czech Republic

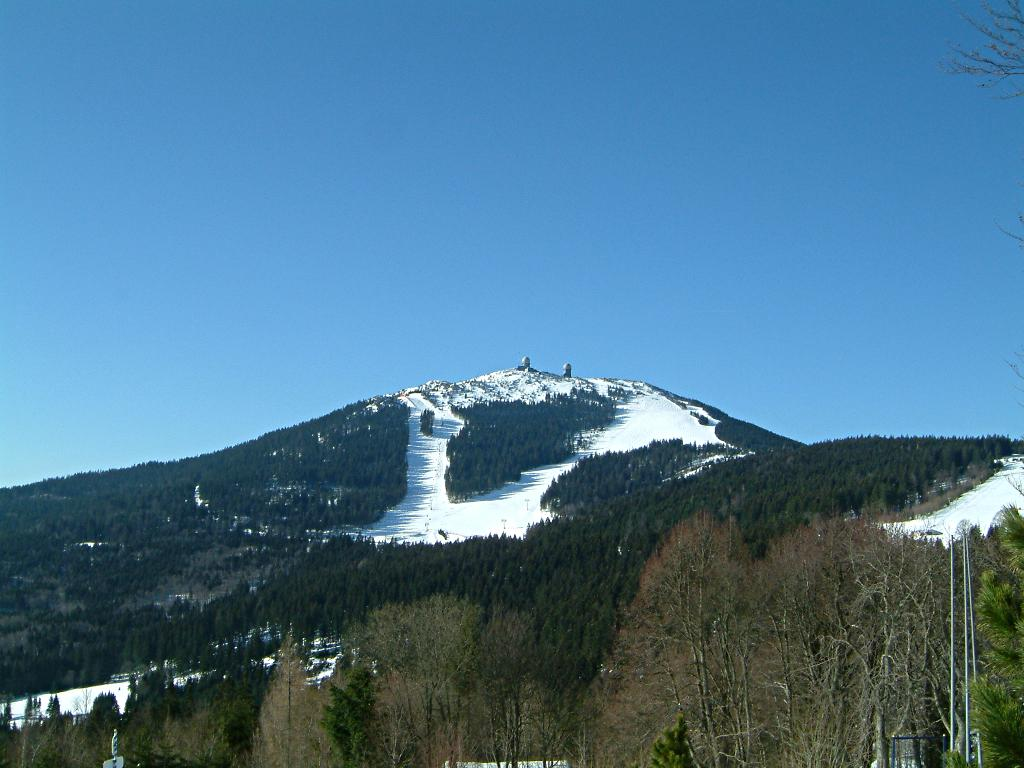
- Großer Arber (Velký Javor)

Highest point
- Peak: Großer Arber
- Elevation: 1,456 m (4,777 ft)

Dimensions
- Length: 100 km (62 mi)

Naming
- Native name: Böhmerwald (German); Šumava (Czech)

Geography
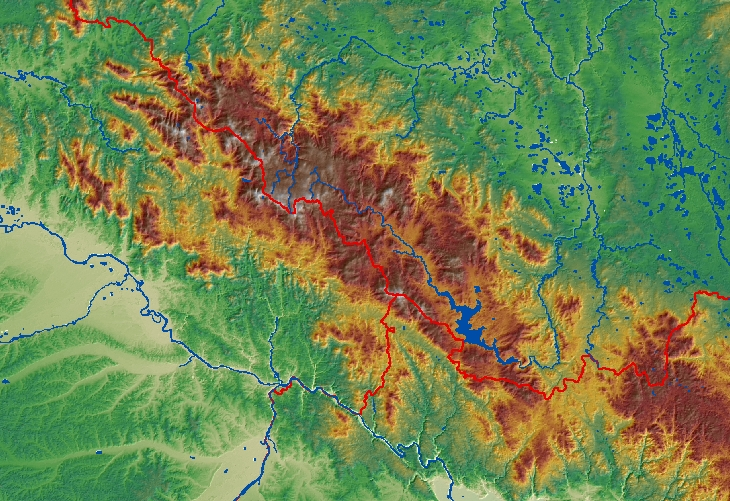
- Topography of the Bohemian Forest
- Countries: Austria; Czech Republic; Germany
- Range coordinates: 49°0′N 13°23′E

The Bohemian Forest (known in Czech as Šumava (pronounced [ˈʃumava]) and in German as Böhmerwald) is a low mountain range in the Czech Republic, Germany and Austria. The mountains extend from the Plzeň and South Bohemian regions into Upper Austria and Bavaria, and form the highest truncated uplands of the Bohemian Massif, up to 50 kilometres (31 mi) wide. They create a natural border between the Czech Republic on one side and Austria and Germany on the other.

== Names and etymology ==
For historical reasons, the Czech and German counterparts have different names in their respective language. In Czech, the entire mountain range is called Šumava, but the German part of the mountain range is also distinguished by the name Bavorský les ('Bavarian Forest'). In German, their end of the forest is Bayerischer Wald ('Bavarian Forest') and the Czech side is Böhmerwald ('Bohemian Forest').

The designation Šumava has been recorded in the late 15th century in Antonio Bonfini's work Rerum unganicarum decades. Folk etymology connects the name's origin to the Czech words šum, šumění (literally 'hum, humming'), denoting the sound of wind in trees. Linguistic consensus defines Šumava as a derivative of a hypothetical Proto-Slavic word *šuma 'dense forest', cf. Serbian šuma as it adjoins regions populated by Sorbs of Lusatia and surrounds (North Eastern Bavaria and Saxony). There are corresponding toponyms in modern-day Serbia, i.e., Šumadija 'land of dense forests'. Modern Serbian maintains the use of the word šuma 'forest' and the toponym Šumava equates to 'forested lands'.

In Ptolemy's ancient maps, the mountain chain is called Gabreta. Greek geographer Strabo calls it Sudeta in his maps. Both names come from Celtic.

== Geography ==
The Bohemian Forest consists of densely forested mountains with an average elevation of 800–1,400 metres (2,600–4,600 ft). On the Bavarian side, the highest peak is Großer Arber at 1,456 metres (4,777 ft). On the Bohemian and Austrian side, the highest peak is the Plöckenstein or Plechý in Czech at 1,378 metres (4,521 ft). The most eastern peak is the Sternstein at 1,125 metres (3,691 ft). The range is one of the oldest in Europe, and its mountains have eroded into round forms with few rocky parts. Typical for the Bohemian Forest are plateaus of about 1,000–1,200 metres (3,300–3,900 ft) elevation with fairly harsh climatic conditions and numerous peat bogs.

=== Water ===
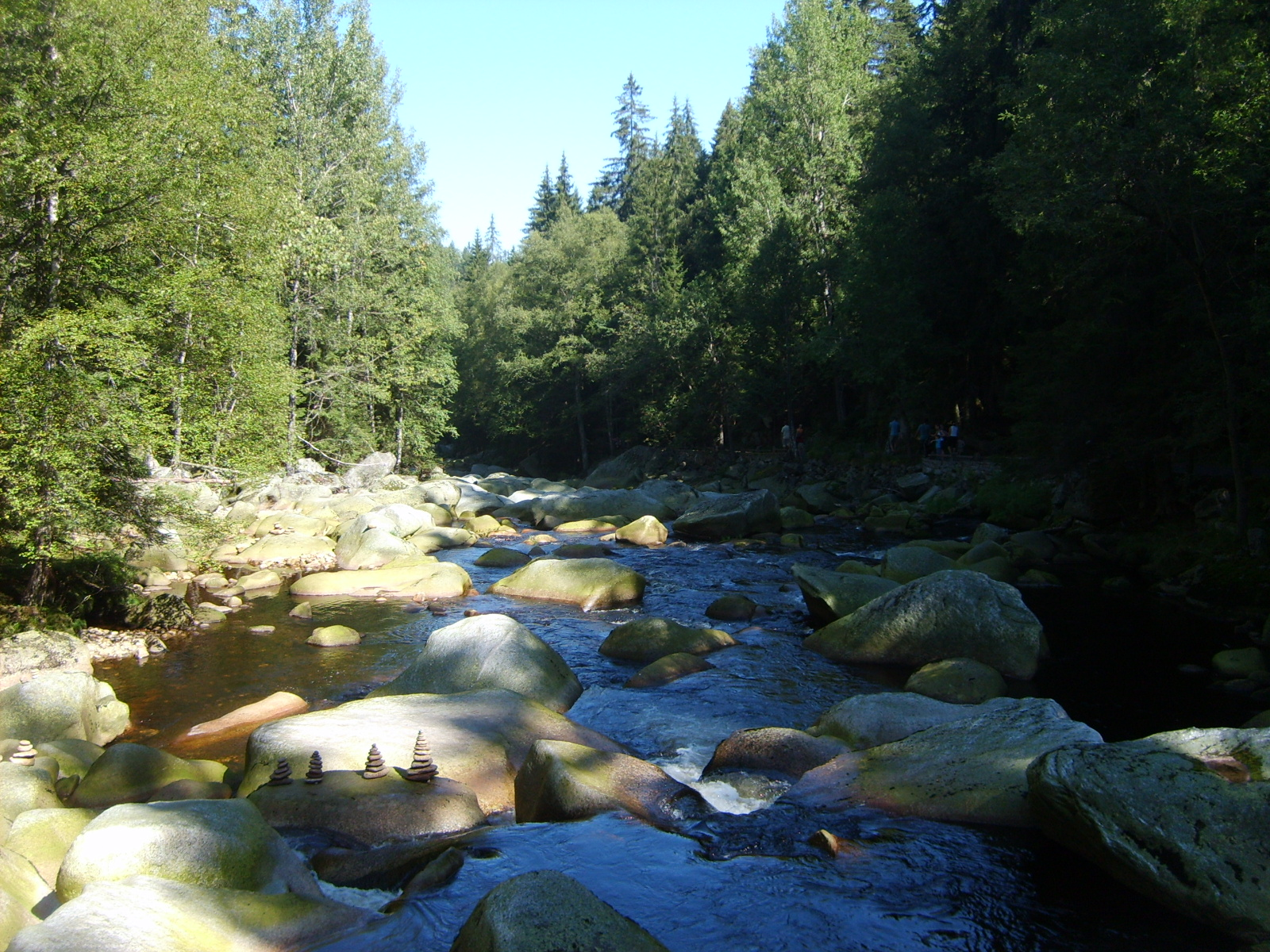
Vydra River

The Bohemian Forest is the dividing range between the watersheds of the Black Sea and the North Sea, where water collected by the Vltava, Otava, and Úhlava rivers flows. These rivers all spring from the Bohemian Forest. Owing to heavy precipitation (mostly snow), the peat bogs and the Lipno Reservoir, the Šumava region is an important water reservoir for Central Europe. More important for their aesthetic value than for holding water are several lakes of glacial origin.

== Nature ==
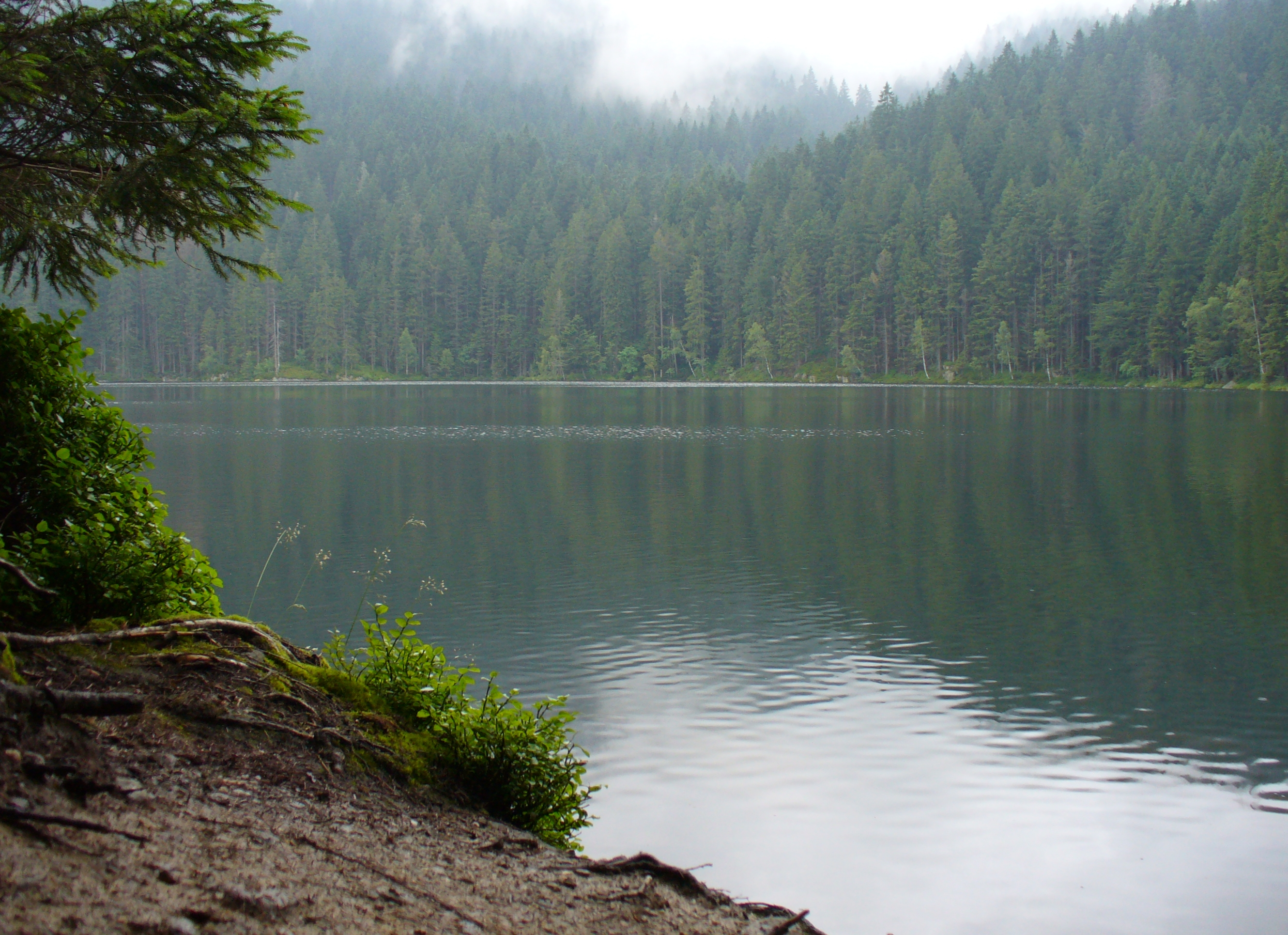
Čertovo jezero Lake

As a border region, the Bohemian Forest has had a complicated history. In the 20th century, it was part of the Iron Curtain, and large areas were stripped of human settlement. Even before that, settlement was sparse, and for centuries, forests dominated over human dwellings and pathways. These unique circumstances led to the preservation of unspoilt nature and forest ecosystems relatively unaffected by human activity. On the other hand, many habitats dependent on farming activity are slowly turning into forests.

In the Czech Republic, the most valuable area is preserved in the Šumava National Park and Protected Landscape and the UNESCO Biosphere Reserve. Part of the German section is preserved as the Bavarian Forest National Park. The Bohemian Forest is a popular holiday destination because it is excellent hiking country. Most interesting natural and cultural sights are connected with more than 500 kilometres (310 mi) of summer marked trails and many bike trails. However, park administration is not always successful in its task, and many believe the rapid growth of tourist accommodation and services is destroying the former calm of the Šumava region. Šumava National Park is also suffering from problems connected with bark beetles, and there is a heated debate about how to deal with them.

== History ==
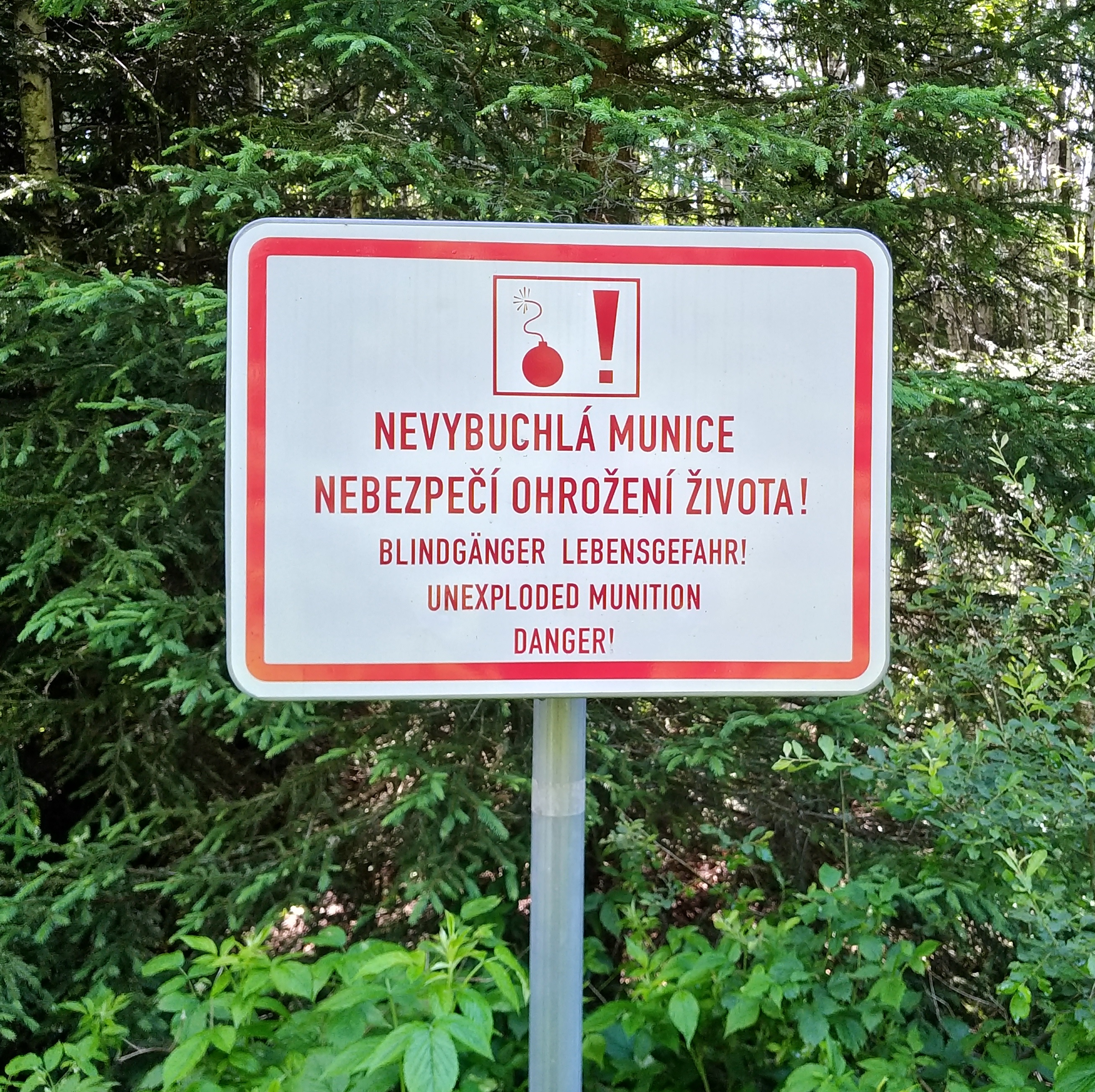
A board pointing out the danger of unexploded ammunition, which remained here from the days of guarding the state border in the Cold War period

According to archaeological findings, the Bohemian Forest was not significantly populated during the Paleolithic era or the Stone Age, dating as far back as 9000 BC. Initial settlements of a more permanent character first appeared in southwest Bohemia during the Bronze Age between 3,000 and 1,000 years BC. In the 1st century AD, the northern part of the forest was inhabited by Gallo-Romans and by Germanic tribes.

The Celts were gradually forced out by Germanic tribes (the Marcomanni), and Celtic settlements fell in disrepair. With the subsequent departure of the Marcomanni, the Bohemian Forest continued to evolve without human influence. The forests only changed their character after the arrival of the Slavs in the region in the 6th century, who sought refuge there. A gradual, haphazard, and subtle type of colonization continued until the late 11th century. Slavic settlements gradually expanded to the south, but didn't reach the upper Vltava valley. These settlements carried the names of Christian Saints, indicating that they formed after the Christianization of Bohemia. Some toponyms suggest that Slavic settlers came in contact with remaining Germanic population.

Under the rule of King Ottokar I, the Bohemian Forest saw sustained and organized colonization by German-speaking settlers. Bavarians, in particular, having prevailed in conflicts with Serbs (modern-day Serbs or Sorbs) for dominance over the area, cleared the forests and founded new settlements in the hitherto uninhabited region, which became culturally close to Bavaria. Since that time, the Bohemian Forest has been heavily influenced by human activity. Virgin forests receded, making way for fields and pastures, and by the 13th century, the colonization of the border region between Bohemia and Bavaria was well underway.

There are currently 136 villages with German names relating to forest clearing (Rodungsnamen) in the area. Additionally, there are clusters of villages of German origin. One such cluster is located between Sonnberg, which was first mentioned in 1279, and around Deutsch Reichenau, dating back to 1261. Another cluster can be found around Zettwing, dating to 1356. Also south of Ottau, German villages form a line along the road from Linz through Hohenfurth to Krummau. Another old settlement dating to 1376 was between Untermoldau (Dolní Vltavice) and Obermoldau, which dates to 1359.

Between 1945 and 1946, the region's German-speaking population was expelled. The originally Sorbian population moved to adjoining places, which to this day testify to their origins in places throughout North Bohemia, i.e., Srbská Kamenice.

== Regions and towns in the Bohemian Forest ==
Towns

- Grafenau (DE)
- Hartmanice (CZ)
- Kašperské Hory (CZ)
- Regen (DE)
- Rejštejn (CZ)
- Vimperk (CZ)
- Volary (CZ)
- Vyšší Brod (CZ)
- Železná Ruda (CZ)
- Zwiesel (DE)

Regions

- Lower Bavaria (DE)
- Mühlviertel (AT)
- Plzeň Region (CZ)
- South Bohemian Region (CZ)
- Upper Palatinate (DE)

== Notable people ==
- Karel Klostermann, author
- Adalbert Stifter, author

== Gallery ==
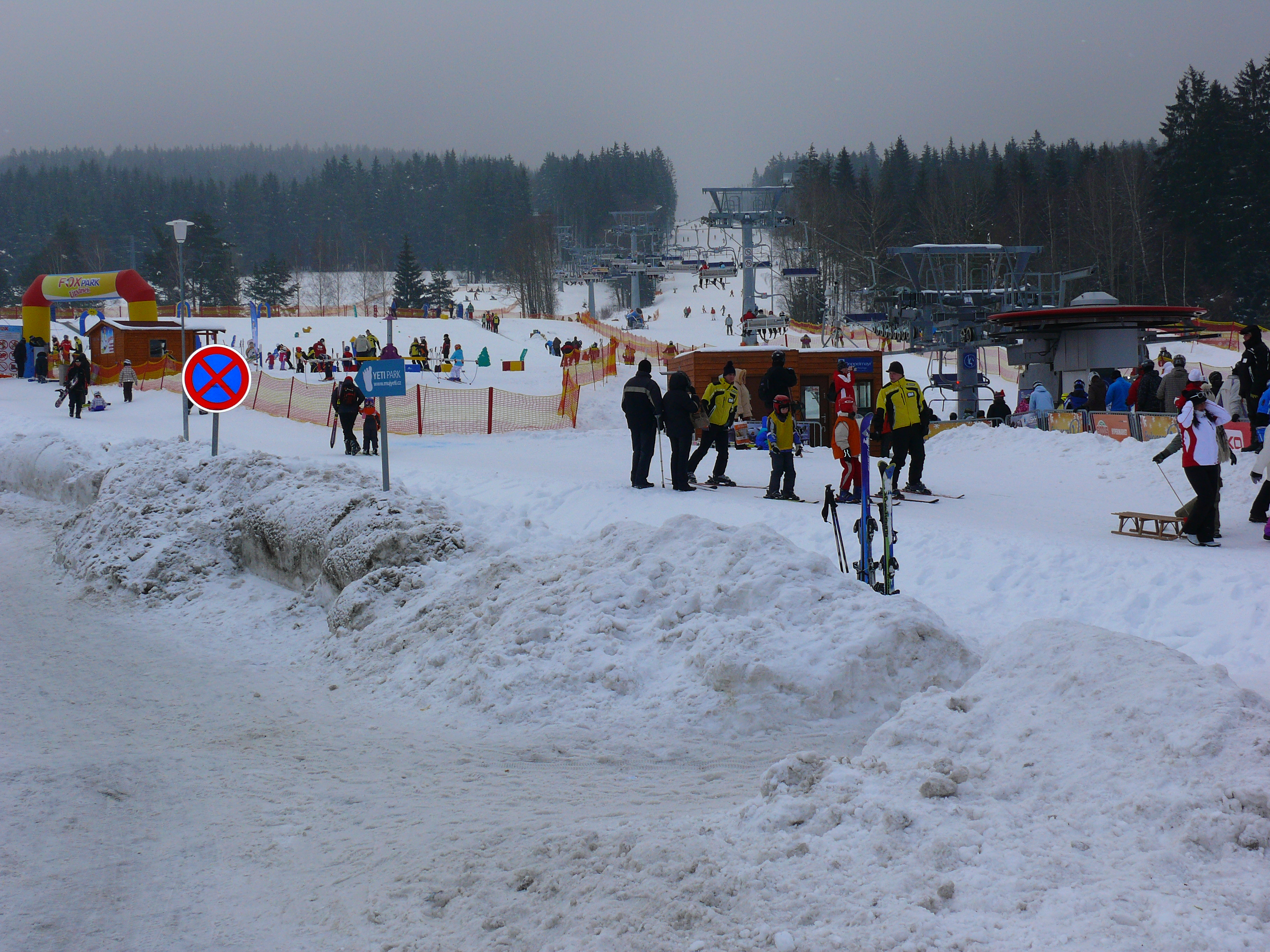
Czech Ski Resort in Šumava

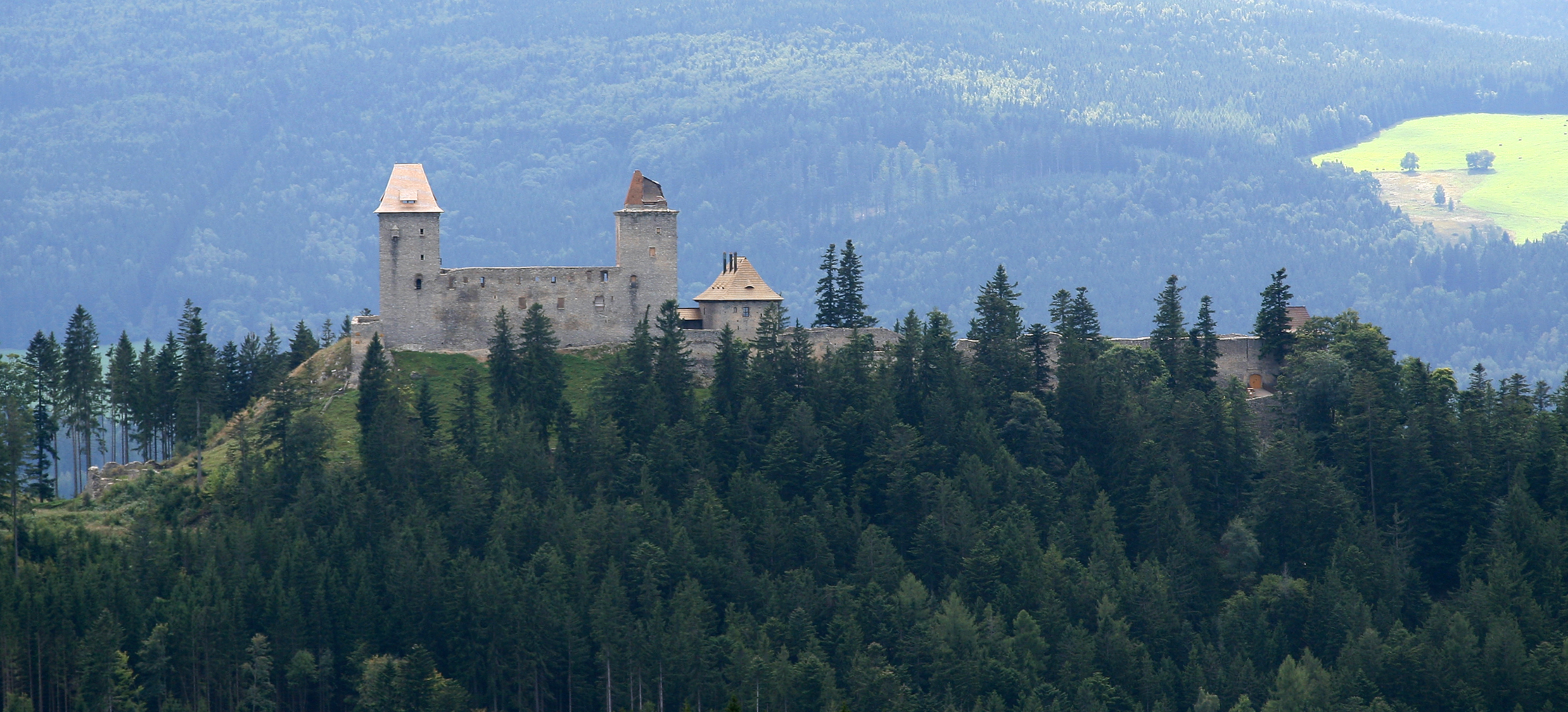
Kašperk Castle
