= Kašperské Hory =

- Town
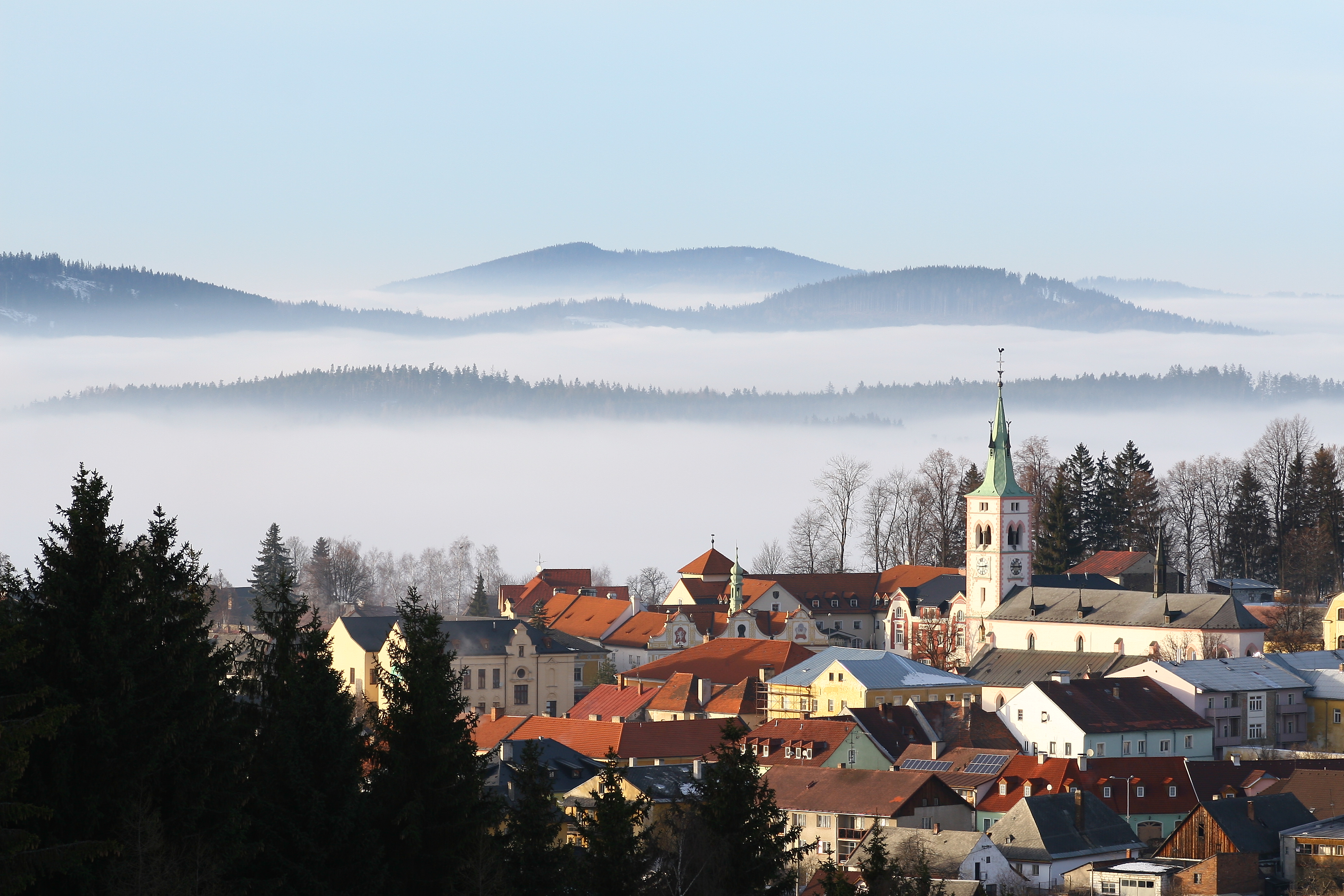
- View from the southeast

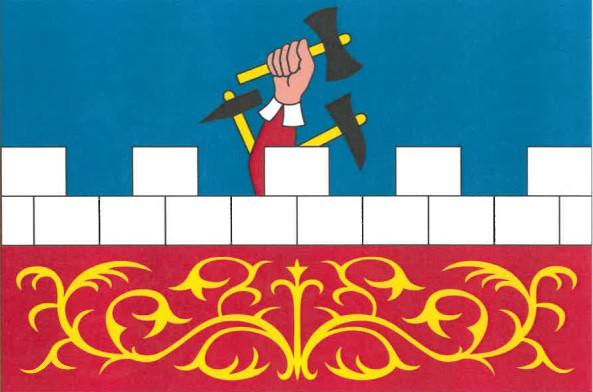
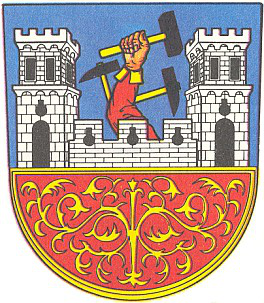
- Flag Coat of arms

- Location in the Czech Republic
- Coordinates: 49°8′38″N 13°33′34″E
- Country: Czech Republic
- Region: Plzeň
- District: Klatovy
- First mentioned: 1337

Government
  - Mayor: Jan Voldřich

Area
  - Total: 44.13 km^{2} (17.04 sq mi)
- Elevation: 758 m (2,487 ft)

Population (2026-01-01)
  - Total: 1,369
  - Density: 31.02/km^{2} (80.35/sq mi)
- Time zone: UTC+1 (CET)
  - Summer (DST): UTC+2 (CEST)
- Postal code: 341 92
- Website: www.kasphory.cz

Kašperské Hory (Czech pronunciation: [ˈkaʃpɛrskɛː ˈɦorɪ]; German: Bergreichenstein) is a town in Klatovy District in the Plzeň Region of the Czech Republic. It has about 1,400 inhabitants. The town is located on the border between the Bohemian Forest Foothills and Bohemian Forest mountain range. It is known as a ski resort.

Kašperské Hory was founded at the turn of the 13th and 14th centuries as a mining settlement. The historic town centre is well preserved and is protected as an urban monument zone. The main landmark is the Church of Saint Margaret.

== Administrative division ==
Kašperské Hory consists of nine municipal parts (in brackets population according to the 2021 census):

- Kašperské Hory (1,238)
- Červená (31)
- Dolní Dvorce (18)
- Kavrlík (7)
- Lídlovy Dvory (6)
- Opolenec (3)
- Podlesí (4)
- Tuškov (26)
- Žlíbek (28)

== Etymology ==
The Kašperk Castle that was built here by Charles IV was named after its founder Karlsberg ("Charles' Mountain" in German) and transcribed to Czech as Kašperk. The town was then named Kašperské Hory, meaning "Kašperk Mountains".

== Geography ==
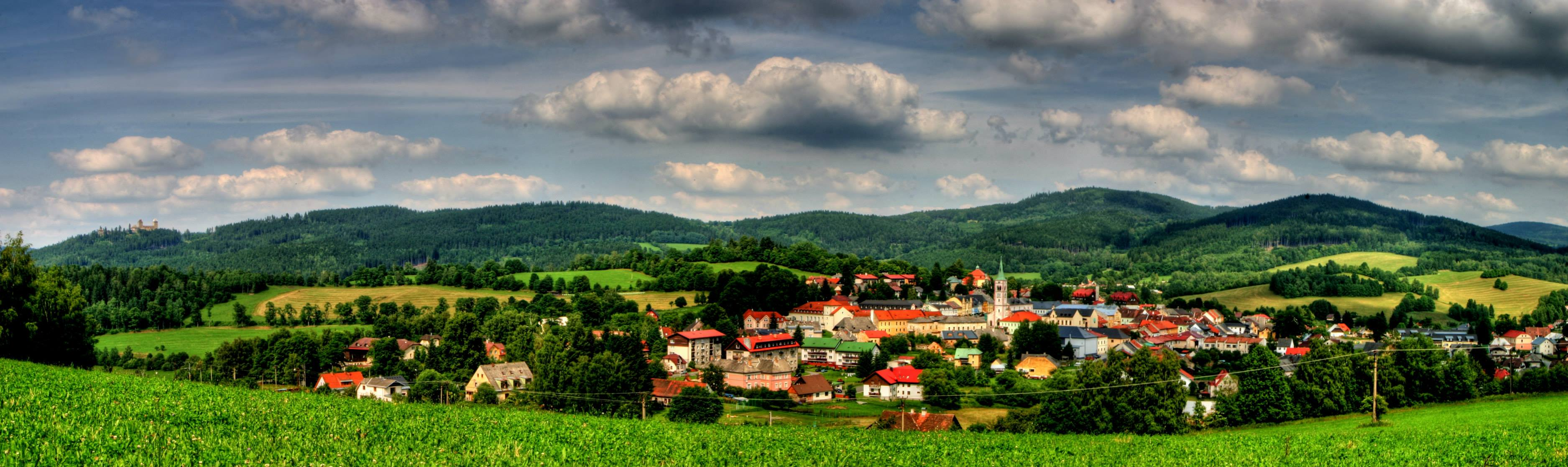
Panorama of the town

Kašperské Hory is located about 34 kilometres (21 mi) southeast of Klatovy and 66 km (41 mi) south of Plzeň. It lies on the border between the Bohemian Forest Foothills and Bohemian Forest mountain range. The highest point is a contour line on the slopes of the mountain Huťská hora at 1,160 m (3,810 ft) above sea level. The Otava River flows along the western municipal border. The municipal territory is rich in small streams.

== History ==
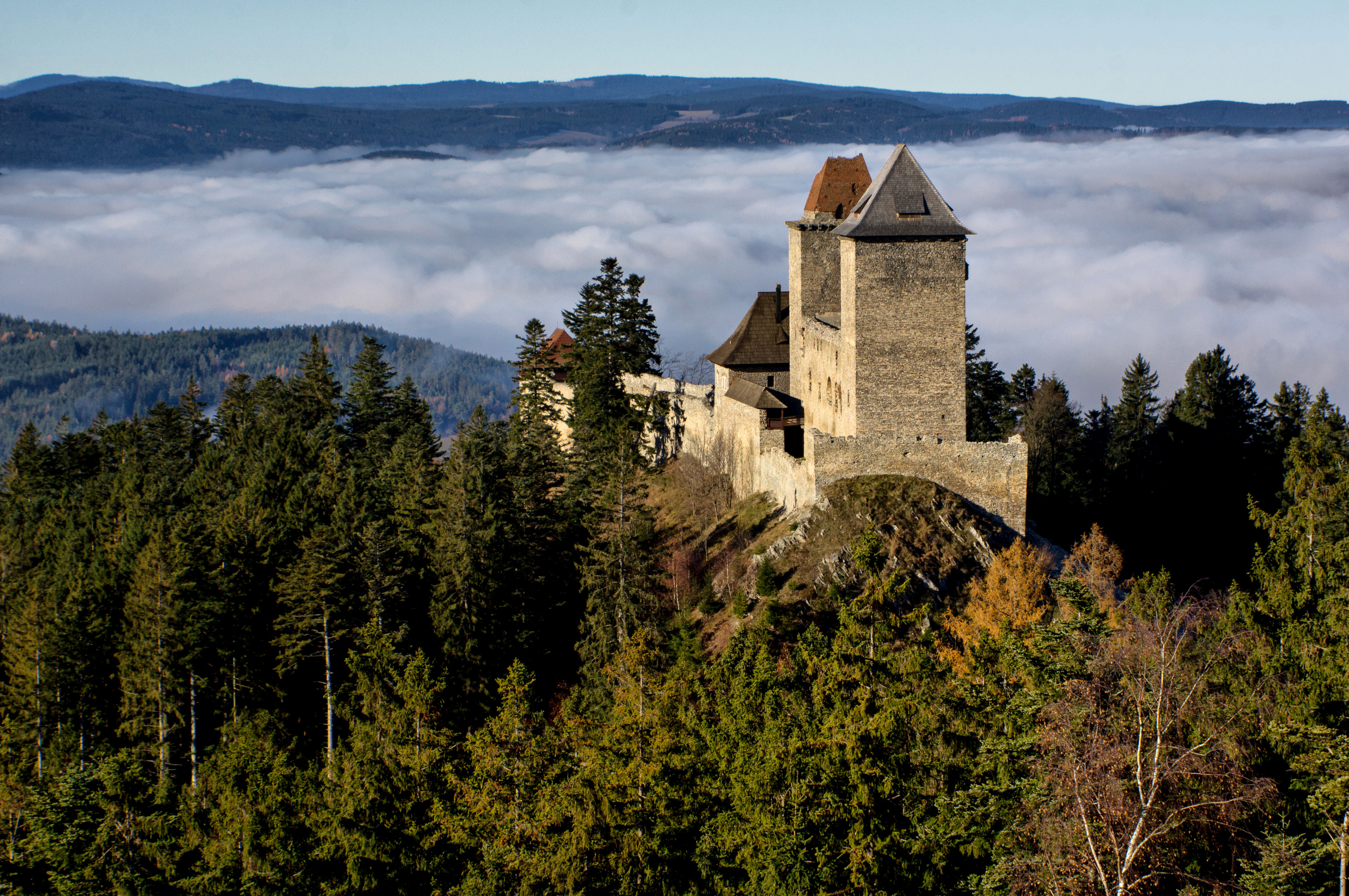
Kašperk Castle

Kašperské Hory existed already at the turn of the 13th and 14th centuries as an extensive mining settlement near an important gold-bearing area. King John of Bohemia promoted the settlement to a mining town. The Kašperk Castle was built above the town by King Charles IV in 1356 to guard the border and protect the trade route and local gold mines. The castle also served as one of administrative centres of the Prácheňsko region. In 1584, the town became a royal town.

Declining gold mining was gradually replaced by trade, glassmaking, woodworking, papermaking and cattle breeding. In the 19th century, Kašperské Hory was the natural regional centre as the seat of offices and schools. It had a German majority.

After the end of World War I, the town became part of Czechoslovakia. After the end of World War II in 1945, the German-speaking population was expelled according to the Potsdam Agreement.

== Demographics ==
Historical population

Year	Pop.	±%
1869	3,333	—
1880	3,479	+4.4%
1890	3,596	+3.4%
1900	3,300	−8.2%
1910	3,287	−0.4%

Year	Pop.	±%
1921	3,316	+0.9%
1930	3,358	+1.3%
1950	2,023	−39.8%
1961	1,683	−16.8%
1970	1,683	+0.0%

Year	Pop.	±%
1980	1,701	+1.1%
1991	1,644	−3.4%
2001	1,603	−2.5%
2011	1,412	−11.9%
2021	1,361	−3.6%

Source: Censuses

== Transport ==
There are no railway or major roads passing through the municipal territory. The town is connectected to its surroundings by the II/145 road.

== Sport ==
The Kašperky ski area is located on Liščí vrch Hill. There are four ski slopes with three ski lifts, and a ski school. There are tracks for cross-country skiing around the town, covering 20 km.

== Sights ==
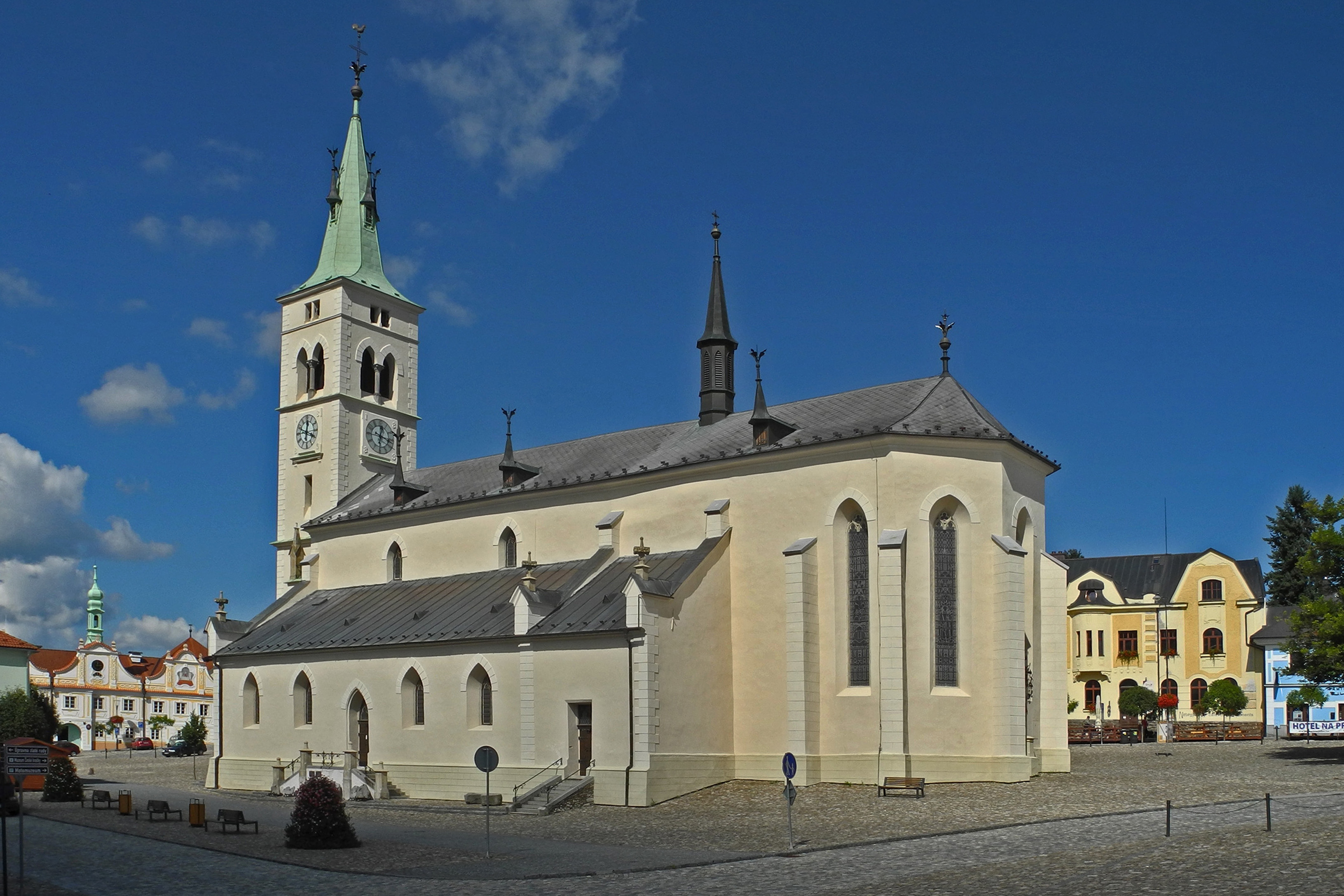
Church of Saint Margaret

The main landmark of the historic town centre is the Church of Saint Margaret. It was originally a Gothic church from the mid-14th century, first documented in 1396. It was modified several times, then in 1883 it was rebuilt in the neo-Gothic style and the tower was added.

There are two museums in the town. The Museum of Šumava features extensive exhibitions on glassmaking, gold mining, natural history and folklore, and seasonal exhibitions. The second museum is the Museum of Historical Motorcycles with the largest collection of historical motorcycles in the country.

Kašperk Castle is located north of the town proper. At 886 m (2,907 ft) above sea level, it is the highest royal castle in Bohemia. At the turn of the 16th and 17th centuries, the castle fell into disrepair and was abandoned. The royal chamber sold the castle to the town of Kašperské Hory in 1616, and it is owned by the town up to the present day. The castle ruin is open to the public and offers guided tours.

== Notable people ==
- Johannes Cardinalis von Bergreichenstein (c. 1375 – after 1428), lawyer and diplomat
- Kurt Raab (1941–1988), German actor

== Twin towns – sister cities ==
Kašperské Hory is twinned with:

- Grafenau, Germany
