= Šumava National Park =

National park in the Czech Republic

Šumava
- IUCN category II (national park)
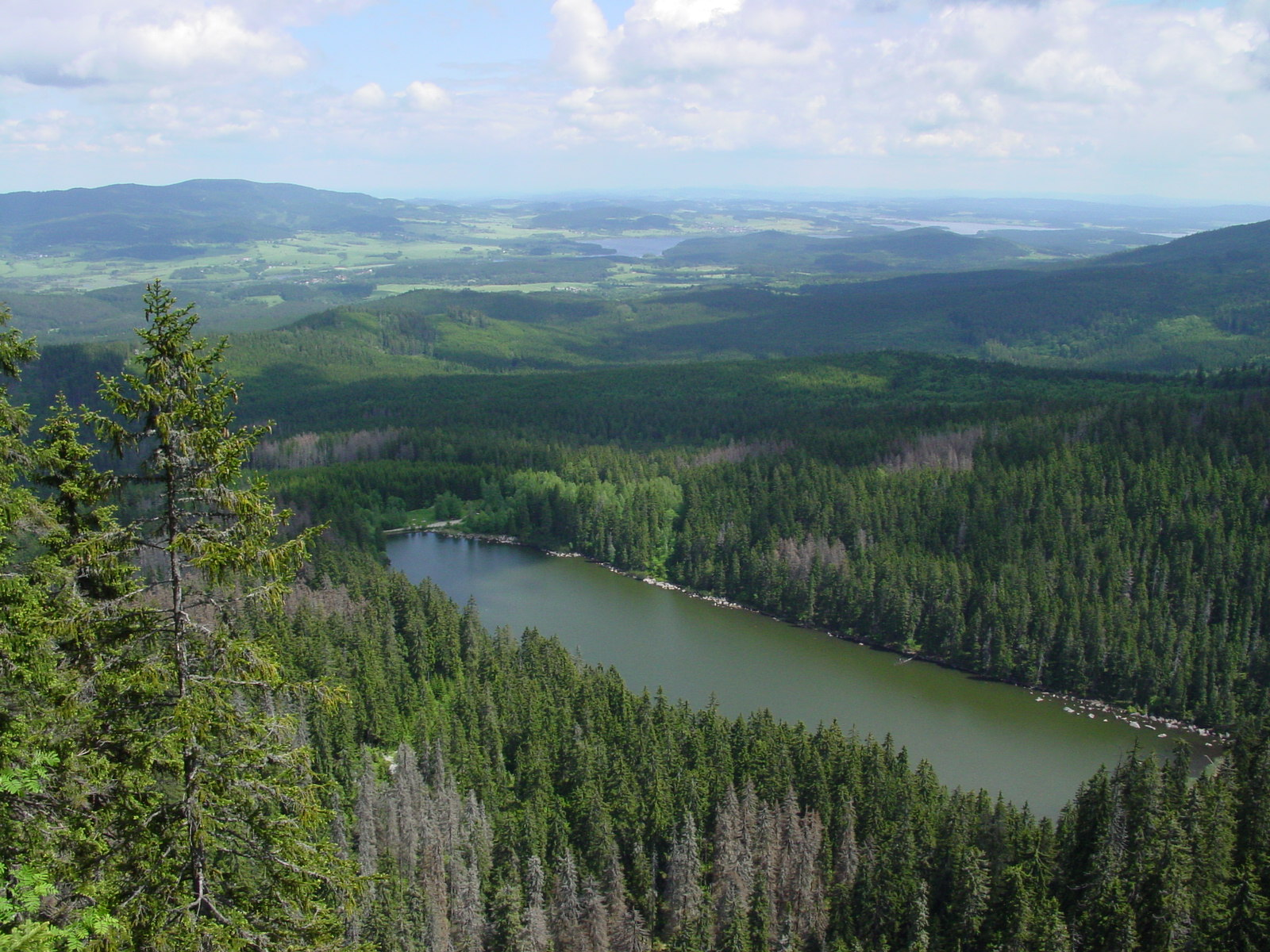
- Plešné Lake Park logo

- Location within Czech Republic
- Location: Czech Republic
- Coordinates: 49°3′38.32″N 13°28′56.92″E
- Length: 100 km (62 mi)
- Width: 20 km (12 mi)
- Area: 680.64 km^{2} (262.80 sq mi)
- Established: 1991-03-20
- Operator: Správa NP a CHKO Šumava
- Website: www.npsumava.cz

The Šumava National Park (Czech: Národní park Šumava, usually shortened as NP Šumava), or Bohemian Forest National Park, is a national park in the South Bohemian regions of the Czech Republic along the border with Germany (where the smaller adjacent Bavarian Forest National Park lies) and Austria. They protect a little-inhabited area of the mountain range of the same name, the Šumava or Bohemian Forest.

The Šumava National Park forms about two-thirds of a former protection known as Protected Landscape Area of Šumava, or simply Šumava PLA, established in 1963. In 1990, the area was designated as a UNESCO biosphere reserve, and in 1991 it was changed to national park status.

The Bohemian Forest (Czech: Šumava) mountain range is covered by the most extensive forest in Central Europe, whose natural composition was, however, changed and today spruce plantations prevail in most of the area. In many places non-native spruce varieties were planted. These are not well adapted to the harsh local climate and are therefore susceptible to a range of elements, such as strong winds (e.g. in the 1980s or recently at the beginning of 2007) and bark beetle (Ips typographus). Numerous large plateaux with raised peat bogs, glacial lakes and remnants of primeval forests (e.g. Boubín) complete a mosaic of habitats which are little disturbed by human settlements as most of the predominantly German-speaking inhabitants were expelled after World War II, and the area became a part of the deserted zone along the Eastern Bloc border. Since the 1970s there has existed a stable population of lynxes.

Originally, a large landscape protected area was declared on 27 December 1963 covering most of the Bohemian Forest. On 20 March 1991 the most valuable part of the area was declared a national park, with the rest of the landscape protected area serving as its buffer zone.

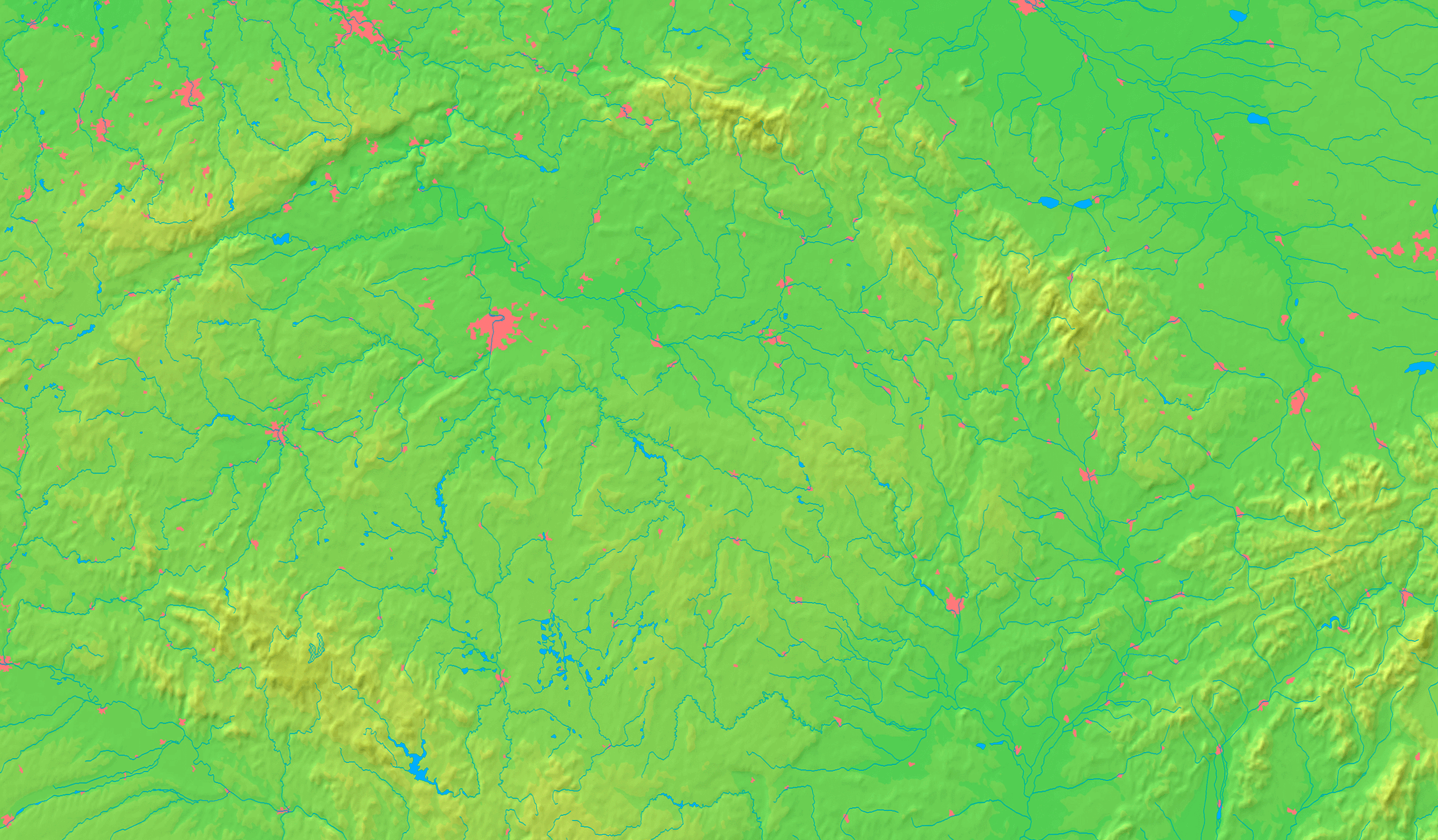
Location of the Šumava NP (darker green) and the Šumava CHKO (lighter green) in the Czech Republic and the adjacent Bavarian Forest NP in Germany

== Sources ==
- Rubín, Josef (2003). Národní parky a chráněné krajinné oblasti. Praha: Olympia. ISBN 80-7033-808-3.
- "Správa NP a CHKO Šumava".
