= Bobrůvka (river) =

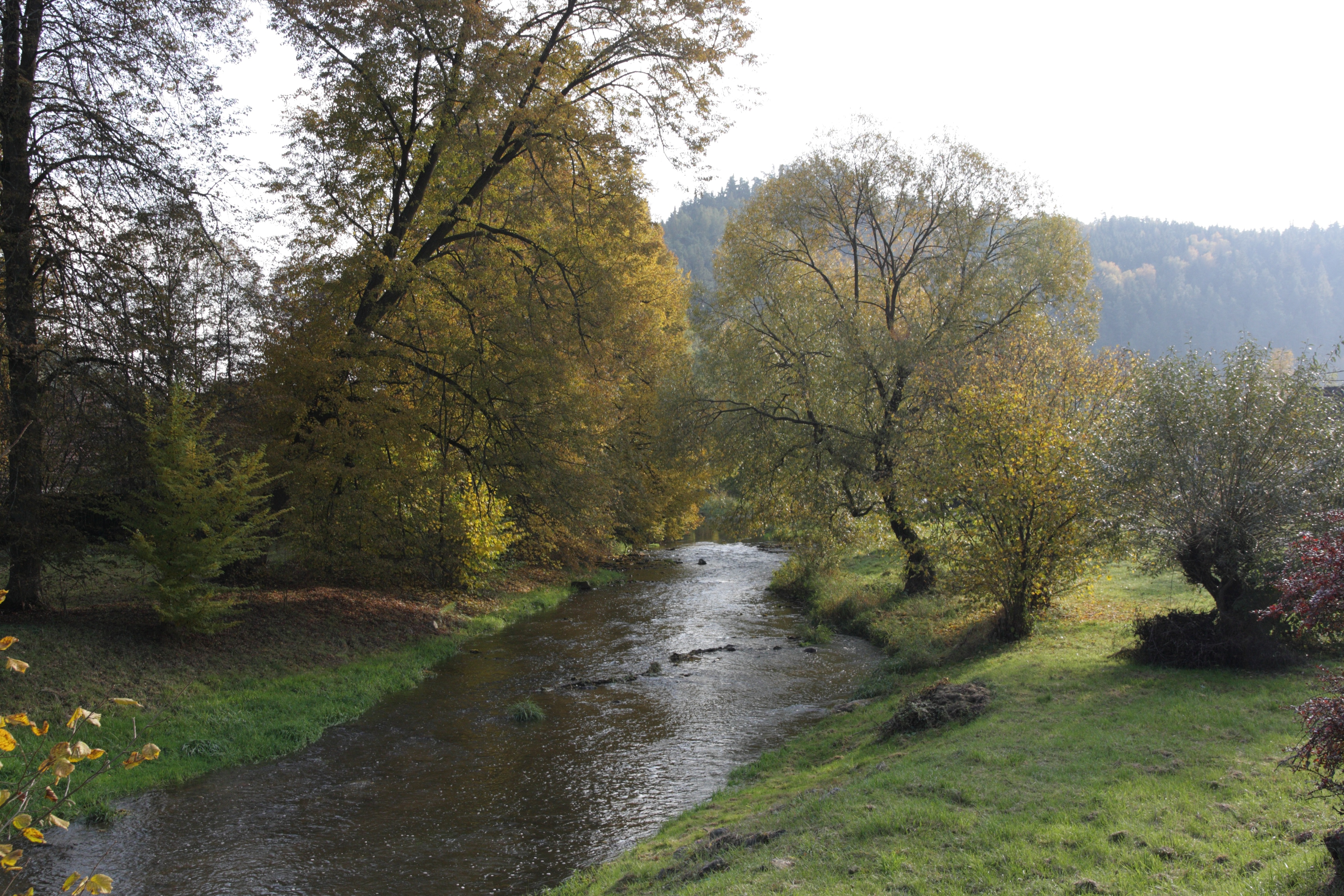
- The Bobrůvka in Skryje

Location
- Country: Czech Republic
- Regions: Vysočina; South Moravian

Physical characteristics
- Source
  - location: Vlachovice, Upper Svratka Highlands
  - coordinates: 49°36′11″N 16°2′44″E
  - elevation: 725 m (2,379 ft)
- Mouth
  - location: Svratka
  - coordinates: 49°21′24″N 16°24′17″E
  - elevation: 253 m (830 ft)
- Length: 62.6 km (38.9 mi)
- Basin size: 389.7 km^{2} (150.5 sq mi)
- Discharge
  - average: 2.09 m^{3}/s (74 cu ft/s) near estuary

Basin features
- Progression: Svratka→ Thaya→ Morava→ Danube→ Black Sea

The Bobrůvka (Czech pronunciation: [ˈbobruːfka]; also called Loučka downstream) is a river in the Czech Republic, a right tributary of the Svratka River. It flows through the Vysočina and South Moravian regions. It is 62.6 km (38.9 mi) long.

== Etymology ==
The river is named after the market town of Bobrová.

== Characteristic ==
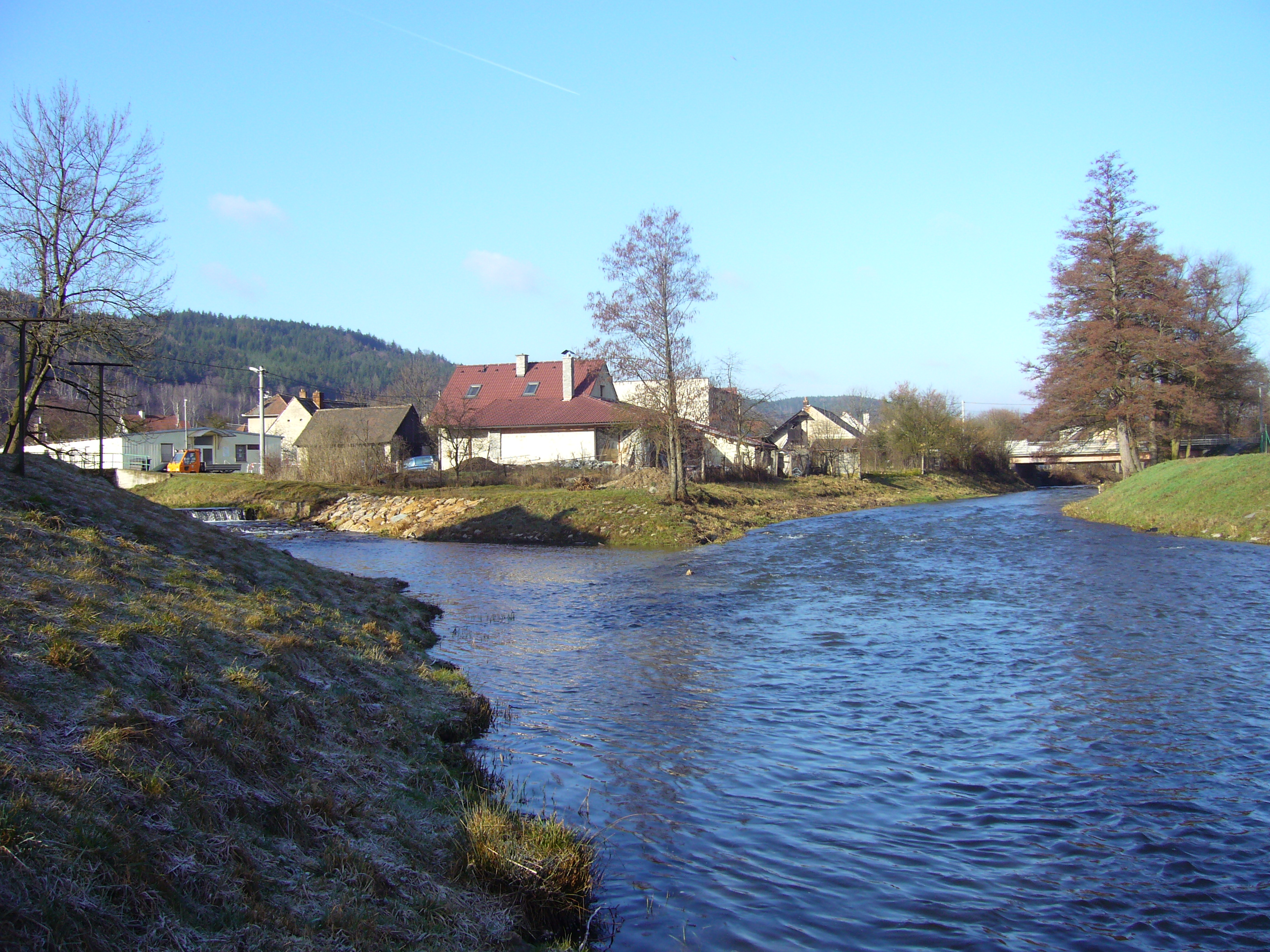
Confluence of the Bobrůvka (right) and Libochovka

The Bobrůvka originates in the territory of Vlachovice in the Upper Svratka Highlands at an elevation of 725 m (2,379 ft) and flows to Předklášteří, where it enters the Svratka River at an elevation of 253 m (830 ft). It is 62.6 km (38.9 mi) long. Its drainage basin has an area of 389.7 km^{2} (150.5 sq mi).

The longest tributaries of the Bobrůvka are:

| Tributary | Length (km) | Side |
|---|---|---|
| Libochovka | 37.9 | right |
| Olešná | 13.3 | left |
| Luční potok | 12.1 | right |
| Řečický potok | 9.5 | right |

After the confluence of the Bobrůvka with the Libochovka on the 4.5 river km, the river is also called Loučka, but from a water management point of view it is still the same river.

== Course ==
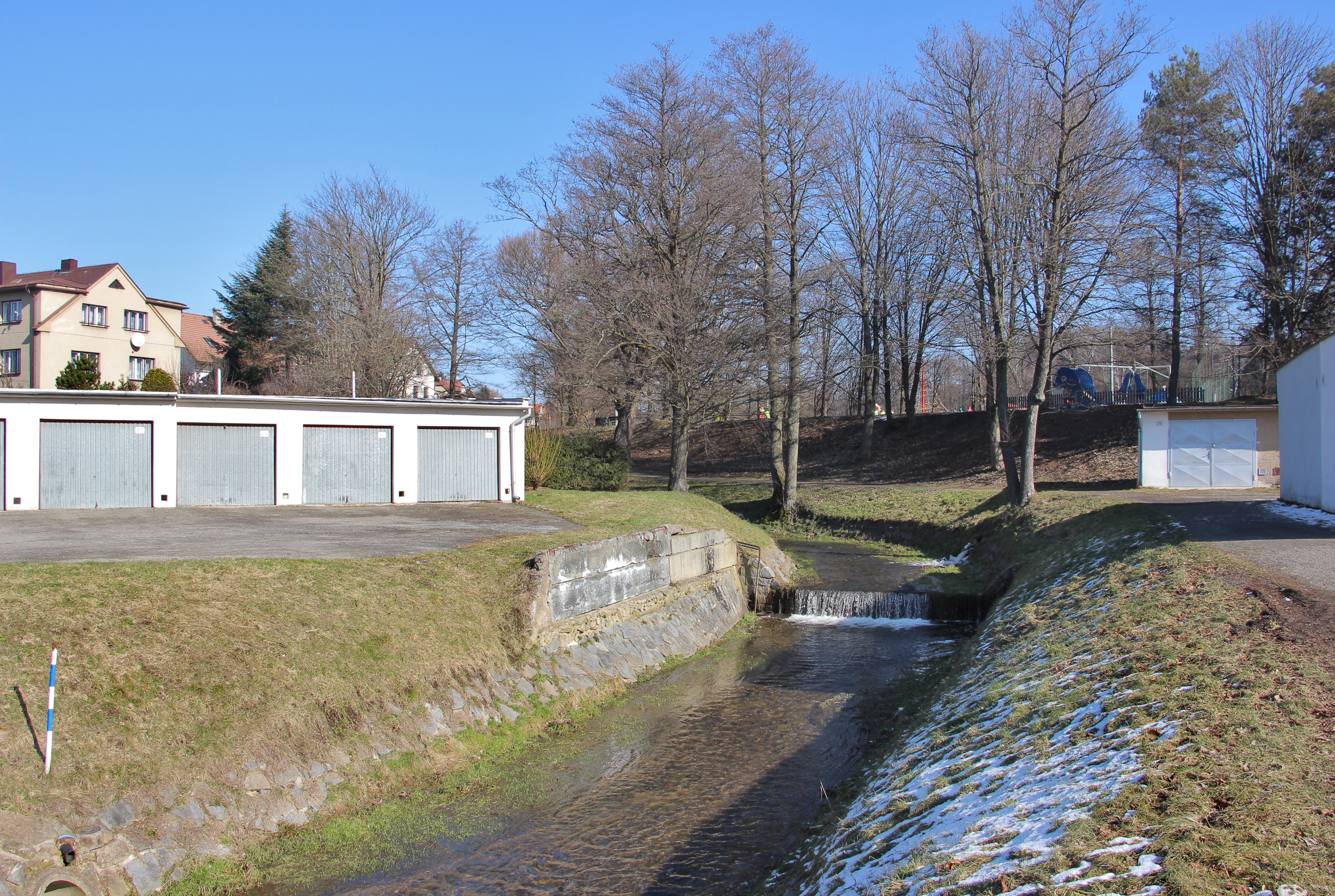
The Bobrůvka in Nové Město na Moravě

The most notable settlement on the river is the town of Nové Město na Moravě. The river flows through the municipal territories of Vlachovice, Nové Město na Moravě, Nová Ves u Nového Města na Moravě, Řečice, Radešínská Svratka, Bobrová, Podolí, Radešín, Zvole, Mirošov, Blažkov, Strážek, Moravecké Pavlovice, Drahonín, Žďárec, Tišnovská Nová Ves, Skryje, Horní Loučky, Újezd u Tišnova, Dolní Loučky and Předklášteří.

== Bodies of water ==
There are 503 bodies of water in the basin area. The largest of them is the fishpond Velký Navrátil with an area of 18.4 ha (45 acres). On the upper course of the river, in Nové Město na Moravě, there are small fishponds built directly on the river.

== Protection of nature ==
The spring and the upper course of the river are located within the Žďárské vrchy Protected Landscape Area.

== Tourism ==
The upper course of the Bobrůvka is suitable for river tourism under certain circumstances. About 31 km (19 mi) of the river is navigable, but only in spring or after heavy rains.

== See also ==
- List of rivers of the Czech Republic
