= Skryje =

Skryje may refer to places in the Czech Republic:

- Skryje (Brno-Country District), a municipality and village in the South Moravian Region
- Skryje (Havlíčkův Brod District), a municipality and village in the Vysočina Region
- Skryje (Rakovník District), a municipality and village in the Central Bohemian Region
