= Svratka =

Svratka may refer to places in the Czech Republic:

- Svratka (river), a river in the South Moravian Region
- Svratka (Žďár nad Sázavou District), a town in the Vysočina Region
- Radešínská Svratka, a municipality and village in the Vysočina Region
