= Vlachovice =

Vlachovice may refer to places in the Czech Republic:

- Vlachovice (Zlín District), a municipality and village in the Zlín Region
- Vlachovice (Žďár nad Sázavou District), a municipality and village in the Vysočina Region
