= Bobrová =

- Market town
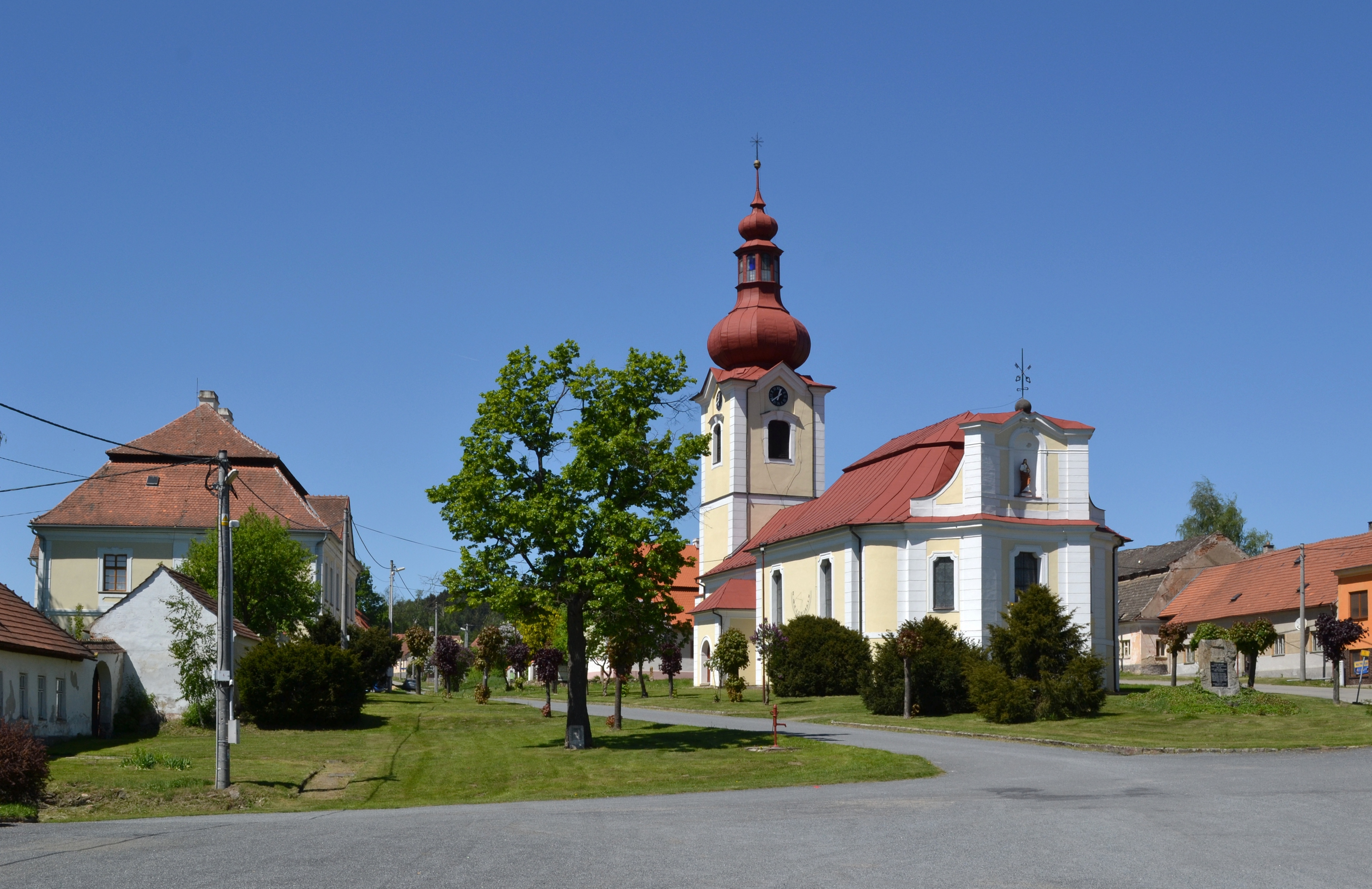
- Centre of Bobrová with the Church of Saints Peter and Paul

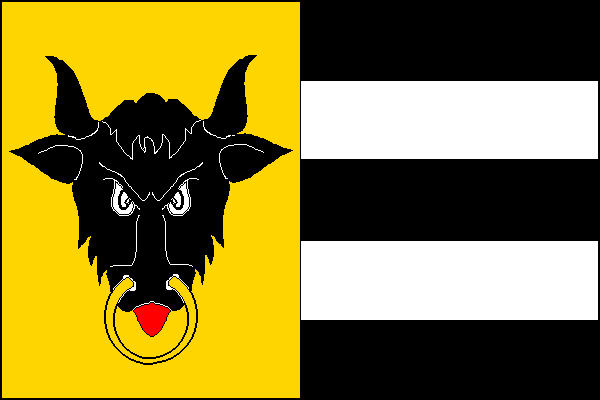
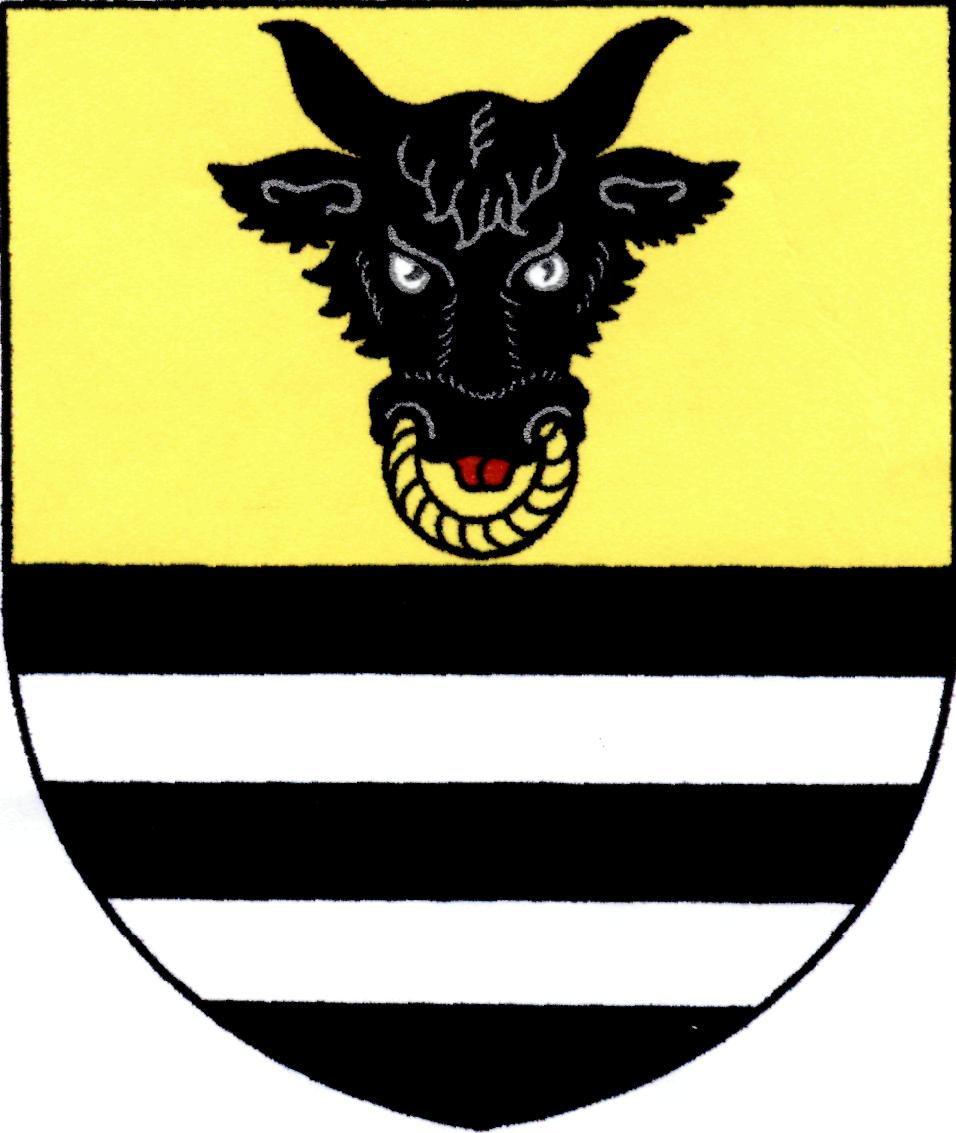
- Flag Coat of arms

- Location in the Czech Republic
- Coordinates: 49°28′30″N 16°7′8″E
- Country: Czech Republic
- Region: Vysočina
- District: Žďár nad Sázavou
- First mentioned: 1252

Area
  - Total: 14.19 km^{2} (5.48 sq mi)
- Elevation: 495 m (1,624 ft)

Population (2026-01-01)
  - Total: 904
  - Density: 63.7/km^{2} (165/sq mi)
- Time zone: UTC+1 (CET)
  - Summer (DST): UTC+2 (CEST)
- Postal code: 592 55
- Website: mestysbobrova.cz

Bobrová (Czech pronunciation: [ˈbobrovaː]; German: Bobrau) is a market town in Žďár nad Sázavou District in the Vysočina Region of the Czech Republic. It has about 900 inhabitants.

== Geography ==
Bobrová is located about 16 kilometres (10 mi) southeast of Žďár nad Sázavou and 44 km (27 mi) northwest of Brno. It lies in the Křižanov Highlands. The highest point is the Kalvárie hill at 594 m (1,949 ft) above sea level. The Bobrůvka River flows through the market town. Kaňovec Pond is located in the municipal territory.

== History ==
The first written mention of Bobrová is from 1252. From 1338, two settlements were distinguished, Dolní Bobrová and Horní Bobrová. Dolní Bobrová was a property of the Cistercian monastery in Žďár nad Sázavou and Horní Bobrová belonged to the Křižanov estate. Horní Bobrová was promoted to a market town before 1368; Dolní Bobrová was promoted to a market town in 1462. From 1464, Horní Bobrová was owned by the Pernštejn family, who sold it to the Cistercian monastery in 1486. The monastery owned both the market towns until its abolition in 1784. Then the estate was divided into several parts and sold to different owners.

In 1950, Dolní Bobrová and Horní Bobrová were merged into one municipality named Bobrová.

== Demographics ==
Historical population

Year	Pop.	±%
1869	1,293	—
1880	1,262	−2.4%
1890	1,343	+6.4%
1900	1,282	−4.5%
1910	1,176	−8.3%

Year	Pop.	±%
1921	1,126	−4.3%
1930	1,106	−1.8%
1950	943	−14.7%
1961	1,013	+7.4%
1970	953	−5.9%

Year	Pop.	±%
1980	863	−9.4%
1991	922	+6.8%
2001	919	−0.3%
2011	879	−4.4%
2021	872	−0.8%

Source: Censuses

== Transport ==
There are no railways or major roads passing through the municipality.

== Sights ==
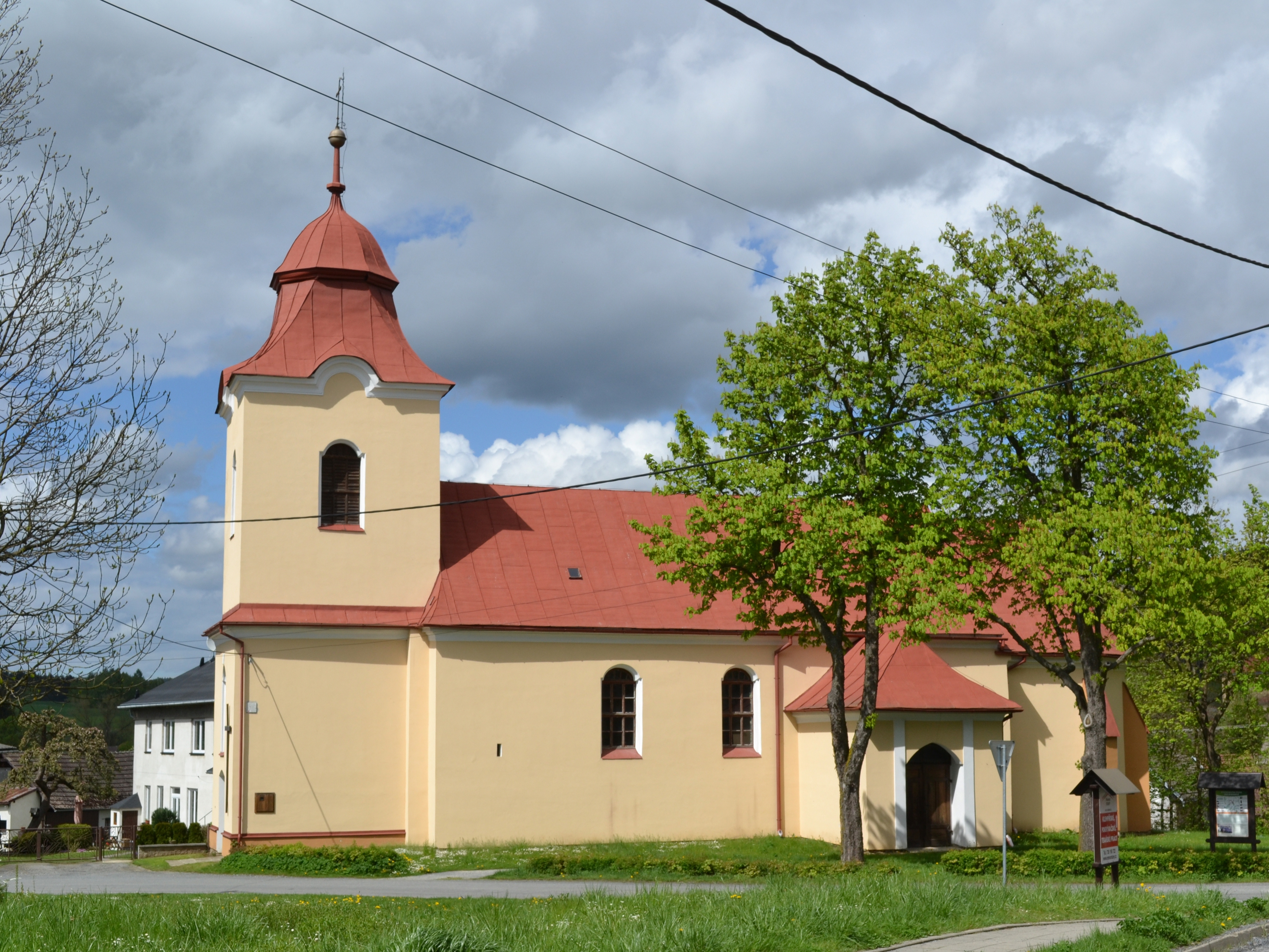
Church of Saint Margaret

The Church of Saints Peter and Paul is a valuable Baroque building. It was rebuilt to its present form in 1714–1722 according to the design by Jan Santini Aichel.

The Church of Saint Margaret was built in the Gothic style in the second half of the 13th century. The tower was added at the turn of the 16th and 17th centuries. Baroque and Neoclassical modifications were made during the 19th century.
