= Strážek =

- Market town
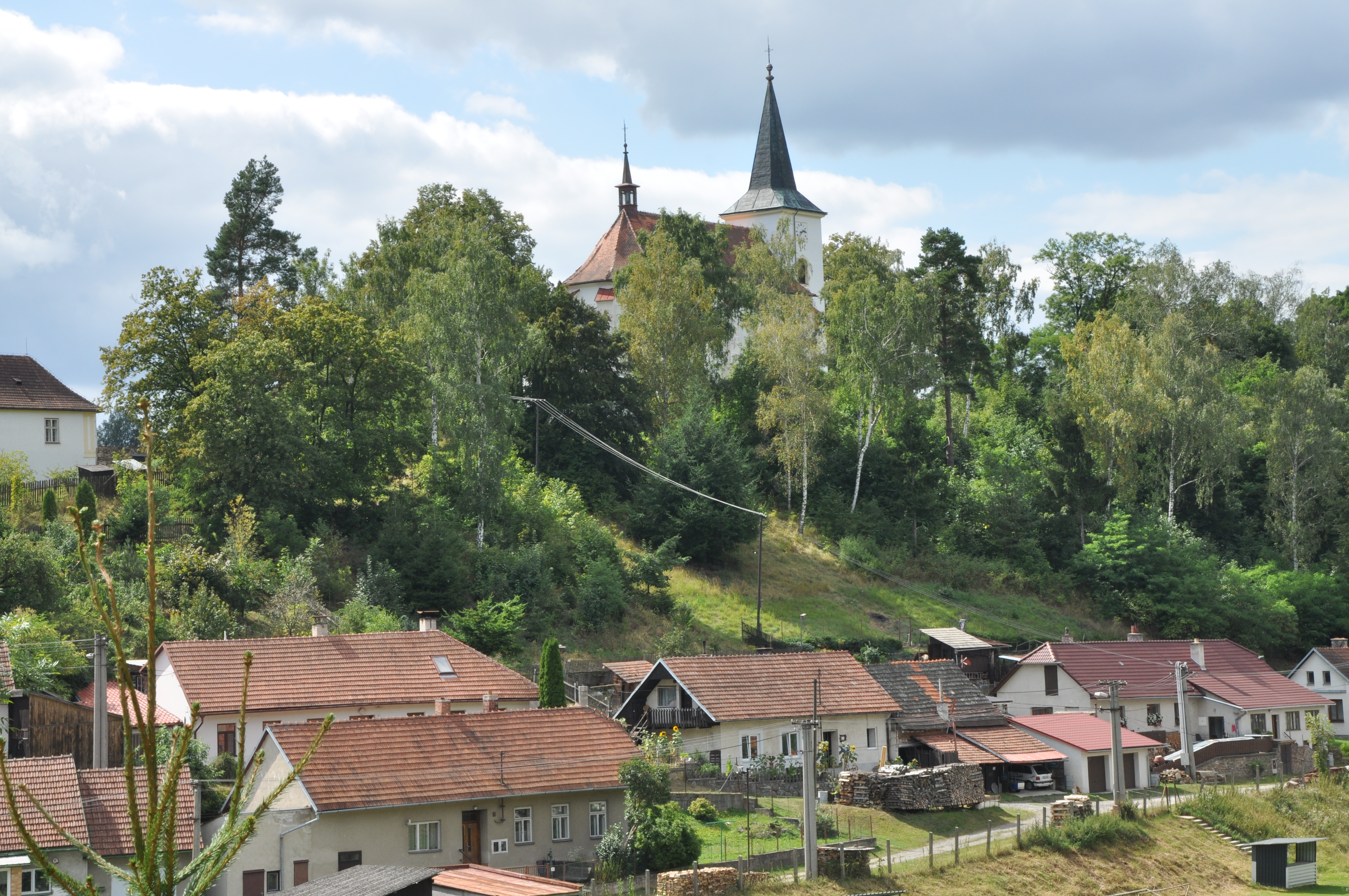
- Church of Saints Simon and Jude above Strážek

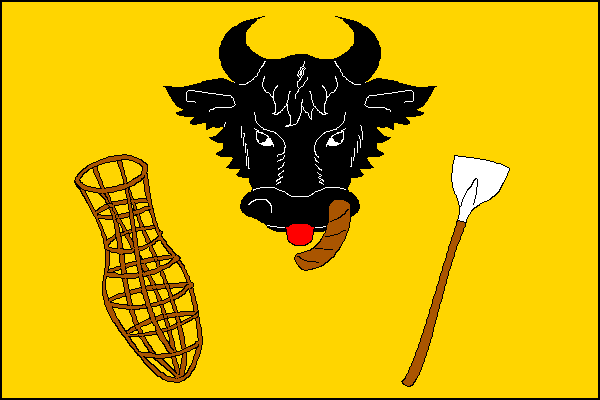
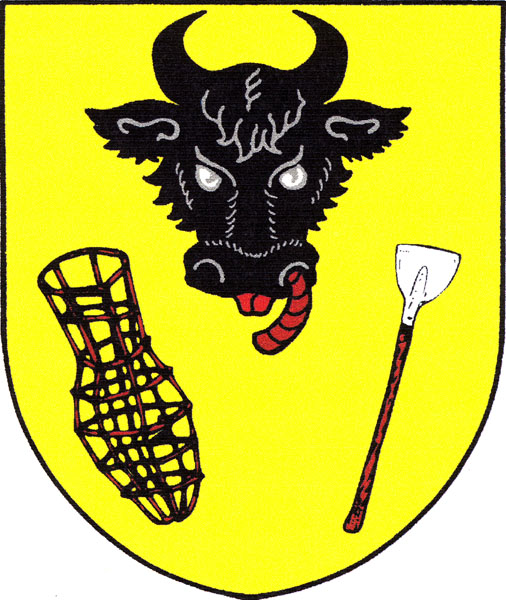
- Flag Coat of arms

- Location in the Czech Republic
- Coordinates: 49°26′27″N 16°11′36″E
- Country: Czech Republic
- Region: Vysočina
- District: Žďár nad Sázavou
- First mentioned: 1358

Area
  - Total: 23.00 km^{2} (8.88 sq mi)
- Elevation: 461 m (1,512 ft)

Population (2026-01-01)
  - Total: 847
  - Density: 36.8/km^{2} (95.4/sq mi)
- Time zone: UTC+1 (CET)
  - Summer (DST): UTC+2 (CEST)
- Postal code: 592 53
- Website: www.mestysstrazek.cz

Strážek (Czech pronunciation: [ˈstraːʒɛk]; German: Straschkau) is a market town in Žďár nad Sázavou District in the Vysočina Region of the Czech Republic. It has about 800 inhabitants.

== Administrative division ==
Strážek consists of six municipal parts (in brackets population according to the 2021 census):

- Strážek (486)
- Jemnice (73)
- Krčma (2)
- Meziboří (138)
- Mitrov (139)
- Moravecké Janovice (37)

== Geography ==
Strážek is located about 22 kilometres (14 mi) southeast of Žďár nad Sázavou and 38 km (24 mi) northwest of Brno. It lies in the Křižanov Highlands. The highest point is the Strážnice hill at 550 m (1,800 ft) above sea level. The Bobrůvka River flows through the market town proper. The Libochovka Stream flows through the village of Meziboří and supplies one of the largest fishponds in the area called Mezibořský rybník.

== History ==
The first written mention of Strážek is from 1358. In 1375, Strážek was already a market town. Until 1560, it belonged to the Mitrov estate, then it was annexed to the Moravec estate.

== Demographics ==
Historical population

| Year | Pop. | ±% |
|---|---|---|
| 1869 | 1,566 | — |
| 1880 | 1,803 | +15.1% |
| 1890 | 1,685 | −6.5% |
| 1900 | 1,605 | −4.7% |
| 1910 | 1,483 | −7.6% |

| Year | Pop. | ±% |
|---|---|---|
| 1921 | 1,517 | +2.3% |
| 1930 | 1,303 | −14.1% |
| 1950 | 1,024 | −21.4% |
| 1961 | 1,218 | +18.9% |
| 1970 | 1,068 | −12.3% |

| Year | Pop. | ±% |
|---|---|---|
| 1980 | 967 | −9.5% |
| 1991 | 973 | +0.6% |
| 2001 | 956 | −1.7% |
| 2011 | 909 | −4.9% |
| 2021 | 875 | −3.7% |

Source: Censuses

== Transport ==
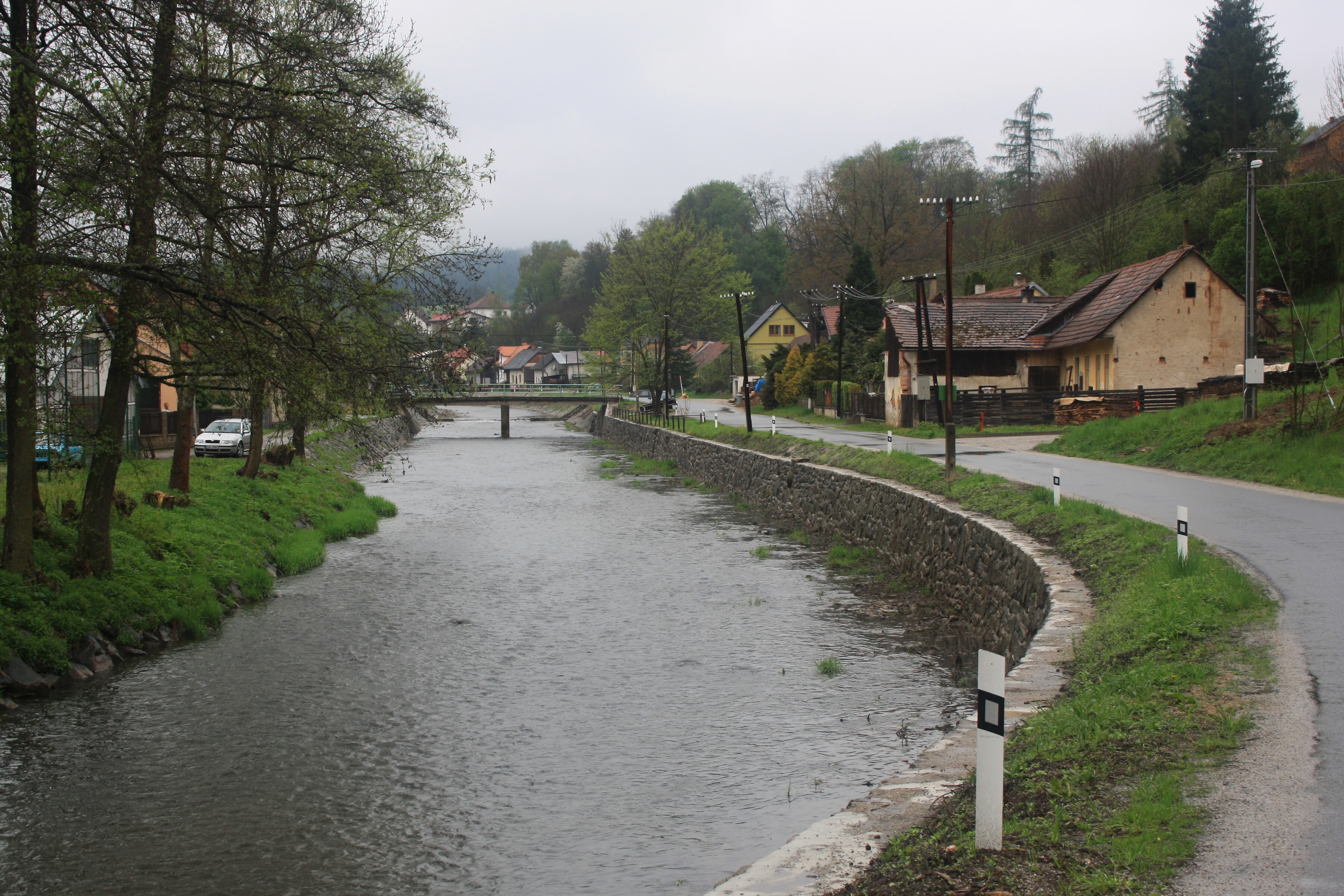
The Bobrůvka River in Strážek

There are no railways or major roads passing through the municipality.

== Sights ==
The main landmark of Strážek is the Church of Saints Simon and Jude. It is an architecturally valuable building, built mainly in the Renaissance style in 1616.

The Mitrov Castle was probably founded at the end of the 13th century. It was abandoned around 1481. The core of the castle was probably dismantled for material for newer construction in the vicinity. Today, the castle is a ruin, from which several walls have been preserved. The ruin is freely accessible.
