= Předklášteří =

- Municipality
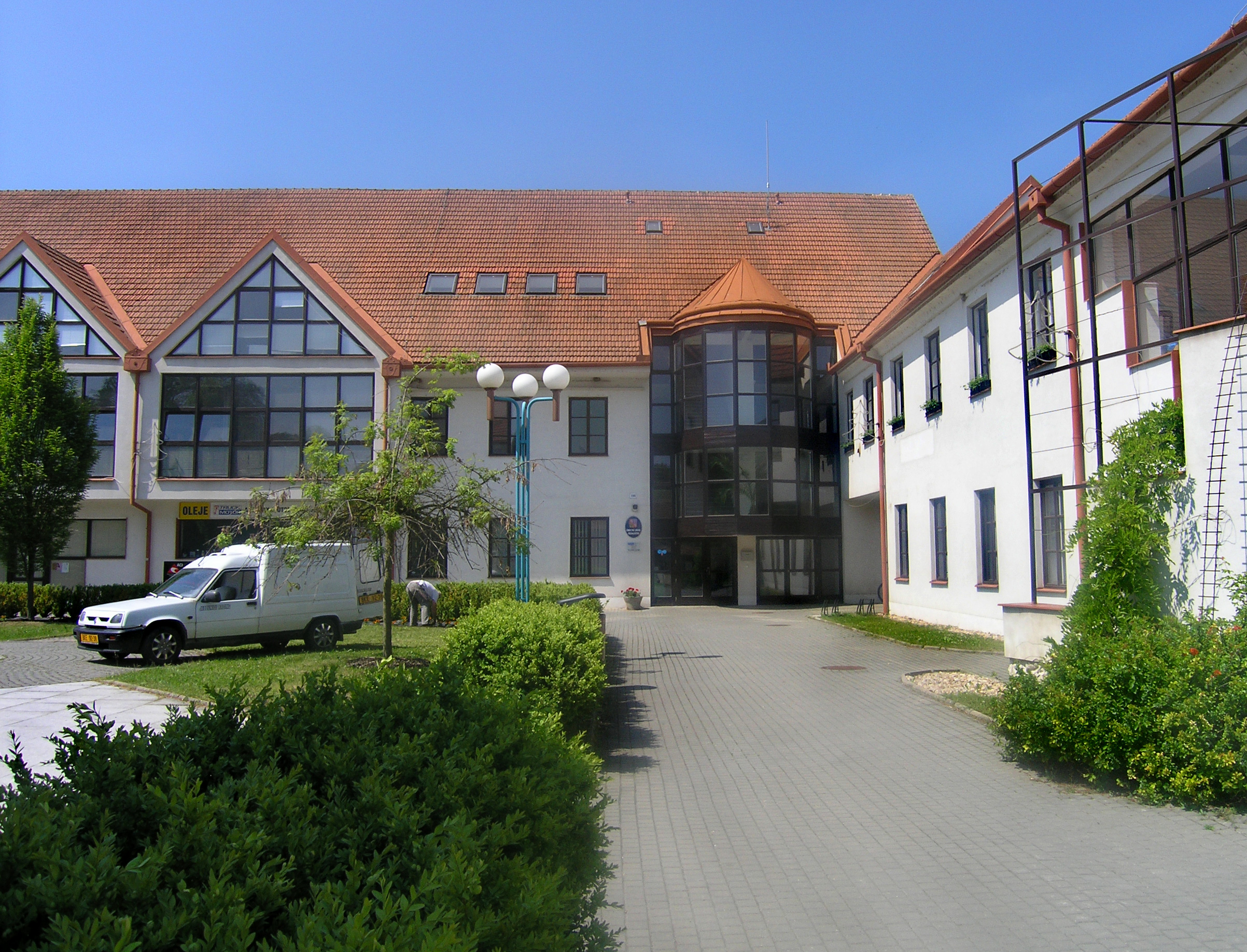
- Municipal office

- Flag Coat of arms

- Location in the Czech Republic
- Coordinates: 49°21′9″N 16°24′9″E
- Country: Czech Republic
- Region: South Moravian
- District: Brno-Country
- First mentioned: 1530

Area
  - Total: 7.26 km^{2} (2.80 sq mi)
- Elevation: 256 m (840 ft)

Population (2026-01-01)
  - Total: 1,464
  - Density: 202/km^{2} (522/sq mi)
- Time zone: UTC+1 (CET)
  - Summer (DST): UTC+2 (CEST)
- Postal code: 666 02
- Website: www.predklasteri.cz

Předklášteří is a municipality and village in Brno-Country District in the South Moravian Region of the Czech Republic. It has about 1,500 inhabitants. The municipality is known for the Porta coeli Convent, which is protected as a national cultural monument.

== Administrative division ==
Předklášteří consists of two municipal parts (in brackets population according to the 2021 census):

- Předklášteří (1,450)
- Závist (6)

== Geography ==
Předklášteří is located about 21 kilometres (13 mi) northwest of Brno. It lies in the Křižanov Highlands. The highest point is the hill Výrovka at 420 m (1,378 ft) above sea level. The municipality is situated on the right bank of the Svratka River, at the confluence of the Svratka and Bobrůvka rivers and the Besének Stream.

== History ==
The first written mention of the Předklášteří area is from 1233, when the Porta coeli Convent was founded. The first written mention of the settlement itself is from 1530.

Předklášteří was joined to Tišnov in 1953–1990. Since 1990, it has been a separate municipality.

== Demographics ==
Historical population

Year	Pop.	±%
1869	1,208	—
1880	1,226	+1.5%
1890	1,030	−16.0%
1900	962	−6.6%
1910	1,078	+12.1%

Year	Pop.	±%
1921	1,166	+8.2%
1930	1,299	+11.4%
1950	1,274	−1.9%
1961	1,276	+0.2%
1970	1,293	+1.3%

Year	Pop.	±%
1980	1,411	+9.1%
1991	1,285	−8.9%
2001	1,344	+4.6%
2011	1,443	+7.4%
2021	1,456	+0.9%

Source: Censuses

== Transport ==
A railway passes through the territory of Předklášteří, but there are no train stations. The municipality is served by the station in neighbouring Tišnov.

== Culture ==
The convent is often used to hold concerts of sacred music.

== Sights ==
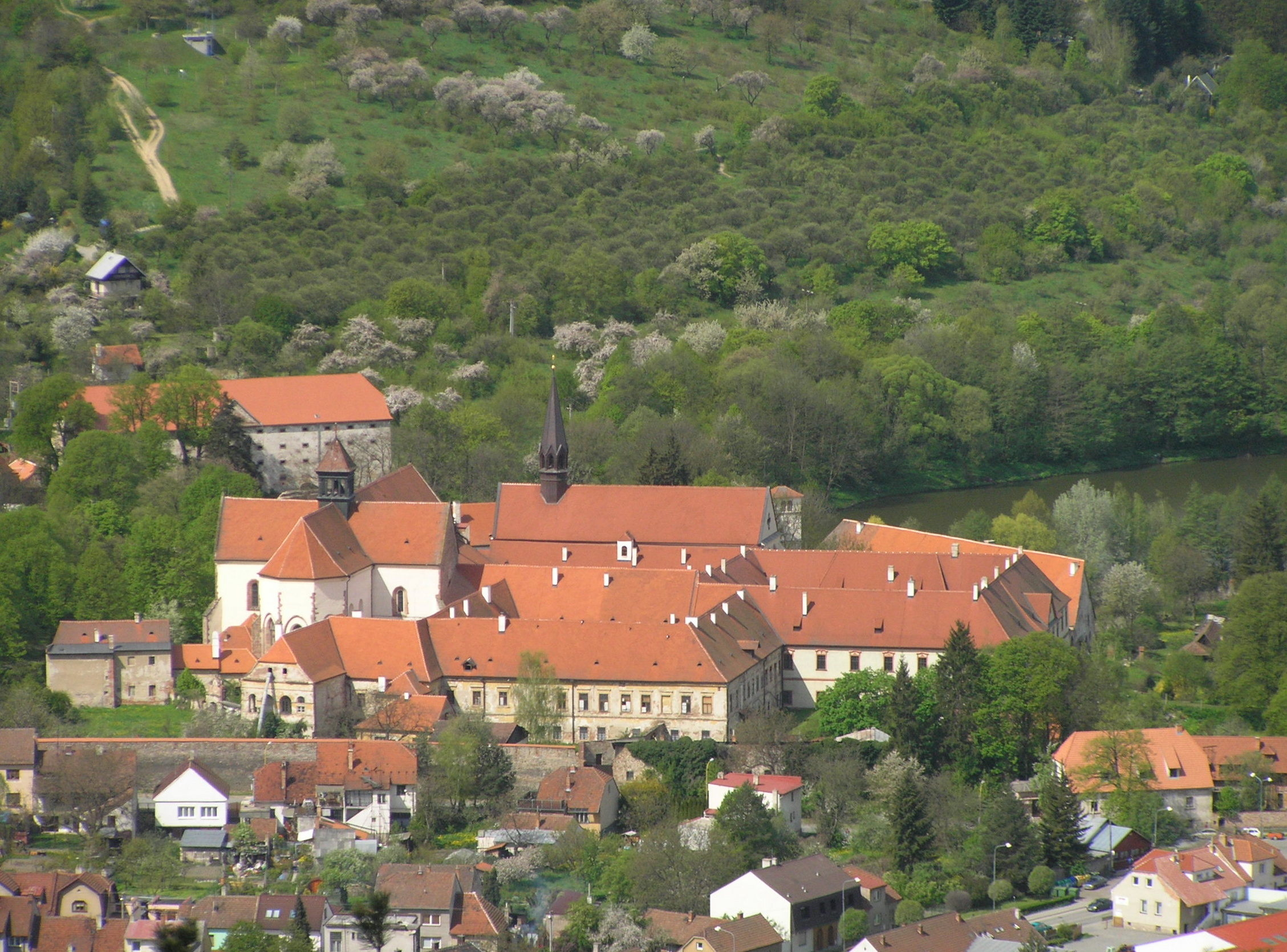
View towards the convent

The main historical and tourist attraction is the Porta coeli Convent, a women's monastery from the mid-13th-century with unique architecture. For its value, it is protected as a national cultural monument.

A significant landmark is also the Church of the Holy Trinity. It was built in the late Gothic style. Next to the church is a Baroque mortuary from around 1700.

== Gallery ==
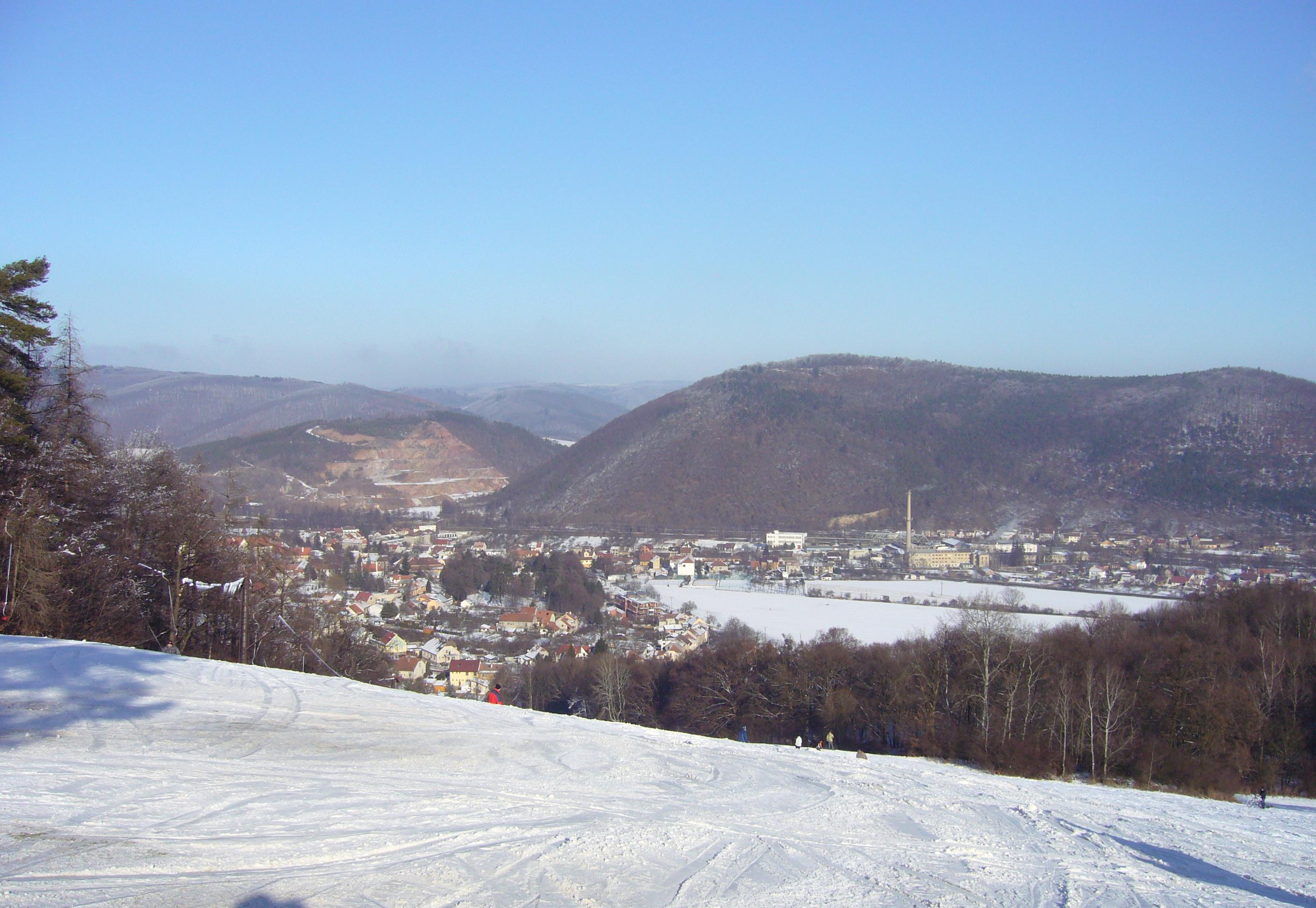
View from the south

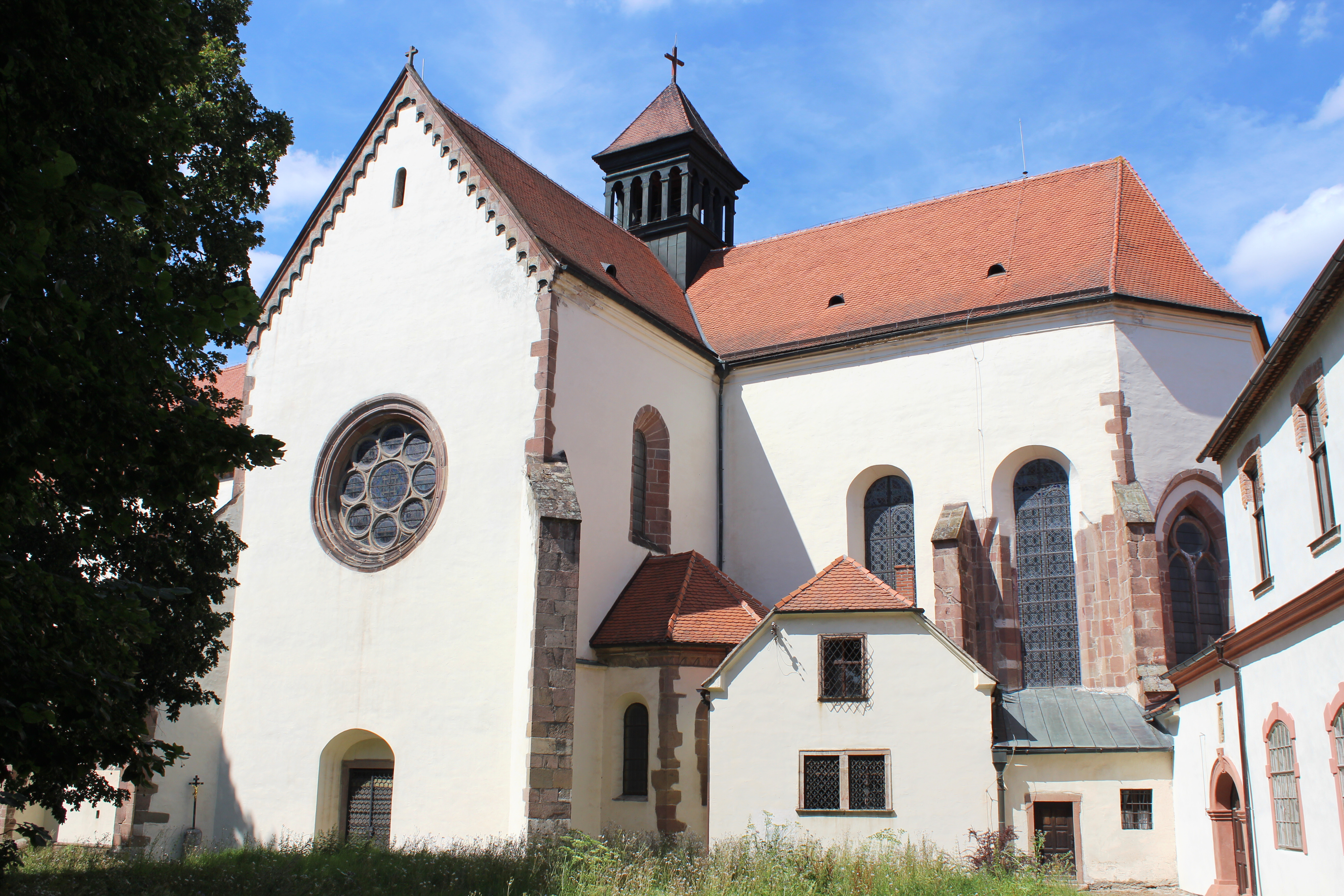
Church of the Assumption of the Virgin Mary in the convent

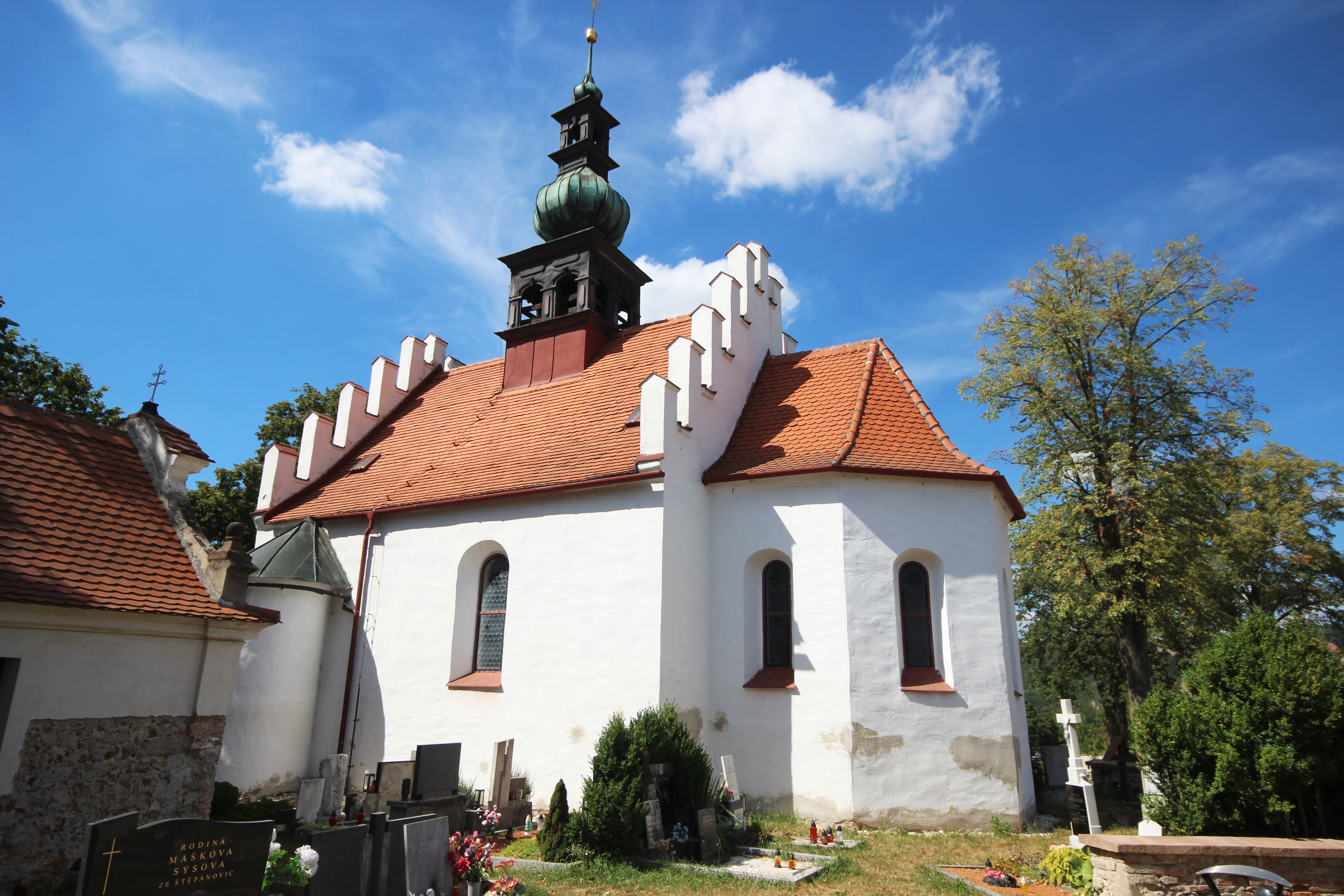
Church of the Holy Trinity
