= Nová Ves u Nového Města na Moravě =

- Municipality
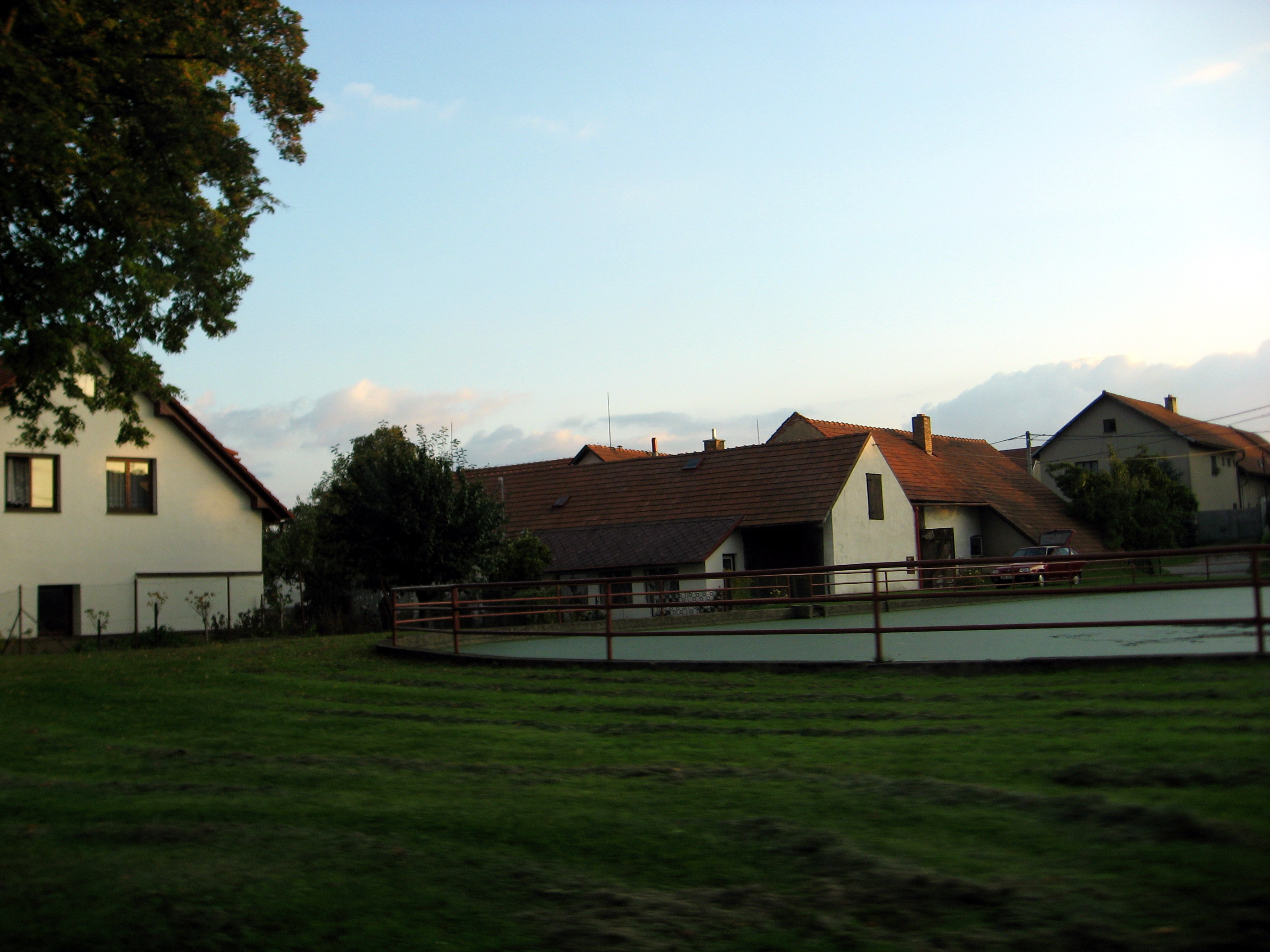
- Houses in the village

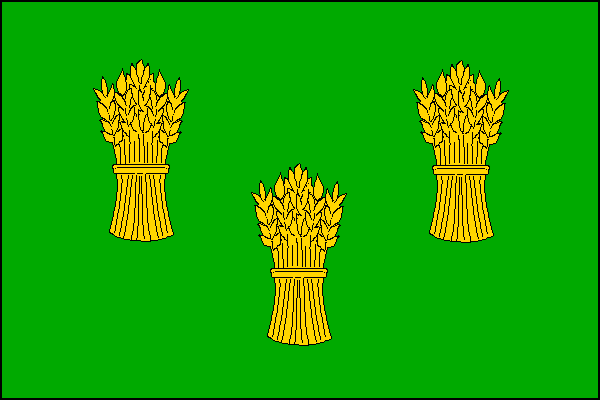
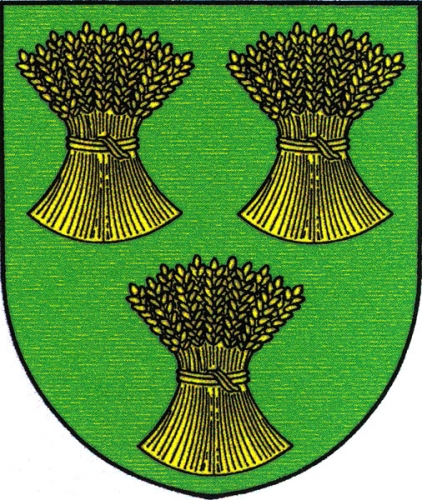
- Flag Coat of arms

- Location in the Czech Republic
- Coordinates: 49°32′24″N 16°5′3″E
- Country: Czech Republic
- Region: Vysočina
- District: Žďár nad Sázavou
- First mentioned: 1412

Area
  - Total: 6.33 km^{2} (2.44 sq mi)
- Elevation: 613 m (2,011 ft)

Population (2026-01-01)
  - Total: 680
  - Density: 110/km^{2} (280/sq mi)
- Time zone: UTC+1 (CET)
  - Summer (DST): UTC+2 (CEST)
- Postal code: 592 31
- Website: www.novavesnm.cz

Nová Ves u Nového Města na Moravě is a municipality and village in Žďár nad Sázavou District in the Vysočina Region of the Czech Republic. It has about 700 inhabitants.

Nová Ves u Nového Města na Moravě lies approximately 12 kilometres (7 mi) east of Žďár nad Sázavou, 40 kilometres (25 mi) north-east of Jihlava, and 135 kilometres (84 mi) south-east of Prague.

== Etymology ==
The name means 'new village near Nové Město na Moravě' in Czech. It is the longest name of a municipality in the Czech Republic, with 26 letters and 7 spaces.

== Demographics ==
Historical population
Year	Pop.	±%
1869	435	—
1880	452	+3.9%
1890	463	+2.4%
1900	451	−2.6%
1910	457	+1.3%
1921	463	+1.3%
1930	451	−2.6%
1950	451	+0.0%
1961	455	+0.9%
1970	471	+3.5%
1980	493	+4.7%
1991	495	+0.4%
2001	541	+9.3%
2011	618	+14.2%
2021	631	+2.1%
Source: Censuses
