= Radešín =

- Municipality
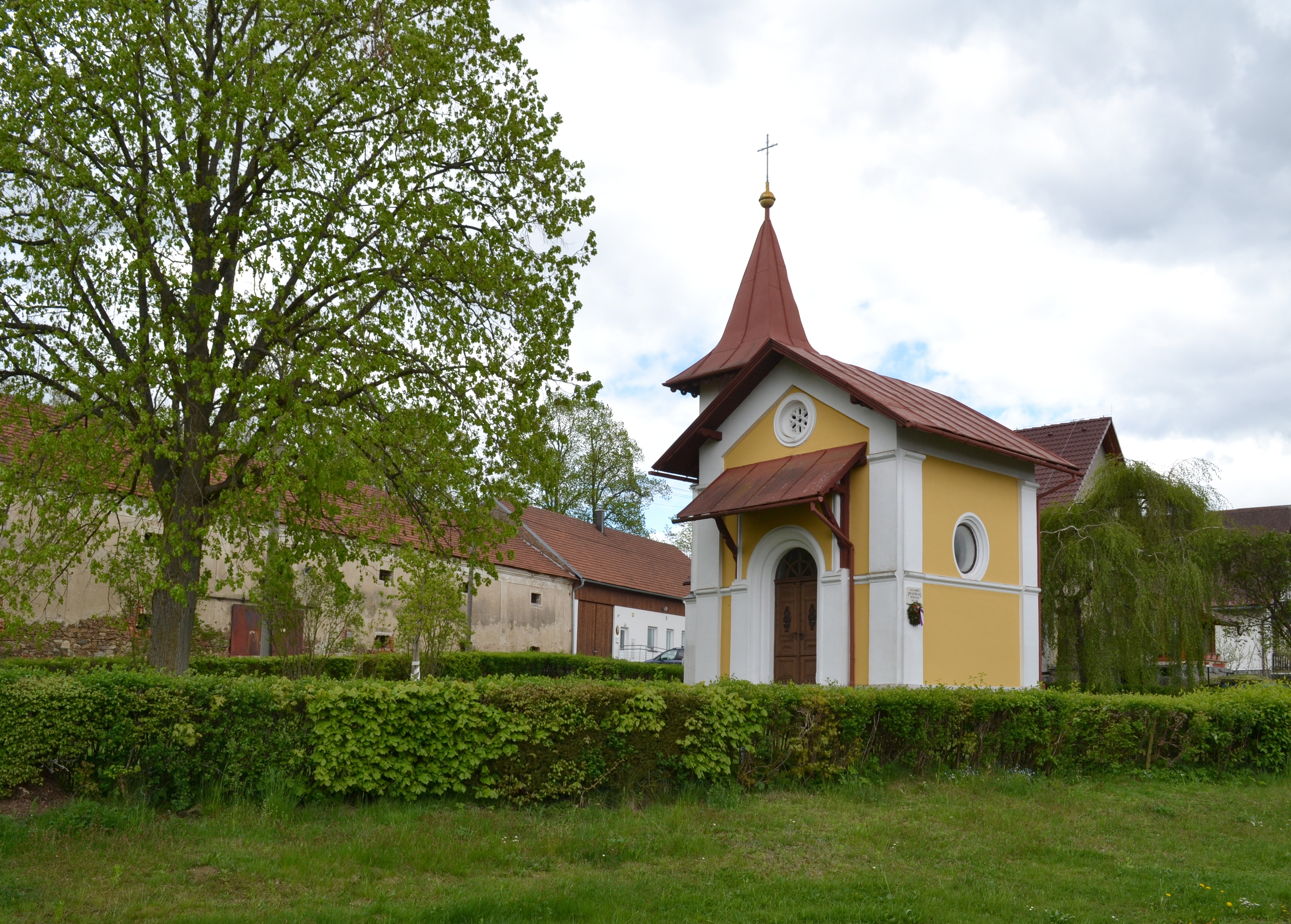
- Chapel in the centre of Radešín

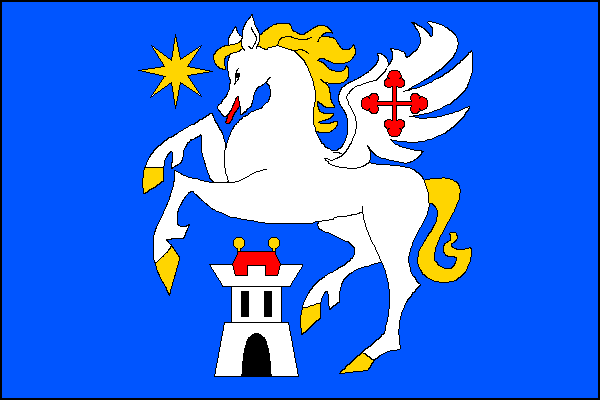
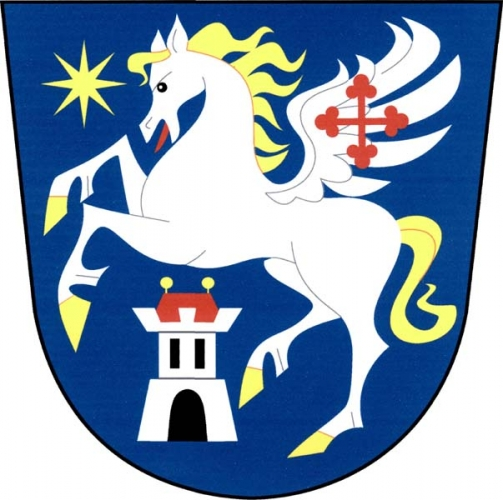
- Flag Coat of arms

- Location in the Czech Republic
- Coordinates: 49°28′13″N 16°5′16″E
- Country: Czech Republic
- Region: Vysočina
- District: Žďár nad Sázavou
- First mentioned: 1453

Area
  - Total: 3.75 km^{2} (1.45 sq mi)
- Elevation: 529 m (1,736 ft)

Population (2026-01-01)
  - Total: 126
  - Density: 33.6/km^{2} (87.0/sq mi)
- Time zone: UTC+1 (CET)
  - Summer (DST): UTC+2 (CEST)
- Postal code: 592 55
- Website: www.obecradesin.cz

Radešín is a municipality and village in Žďár nad Sázavou District in the Vysočina Region of the Czech Republic. It has about 100 inhabitants.

Radešín lies approximately 16 kilometres (10 mi) south-east of Žďár nad Sázavou, 37 km (23 mi) east of Jihlava, and 138 km (86 mi) south-east of Prague.

== Demographics ==
Historical population
Year	Pop.	±%
1869	150	—
1880	147	−2.0%
1890	158	+7.5%
1900	138	−12.7%
1910	170	+23.2%
1921	191	+12.4%
1930	182	−4.7%
1950	187	+2.7%
1961	185	−1.1%
1970	165	−10.8%
1980	117	−29.1%
1991	107	−8.5%
2001	110	+2.8%
2011	116	+5.5%
2021	123	+6.0%
Source: Censuses
