= Moravecké Pavlovice =

- Municipality
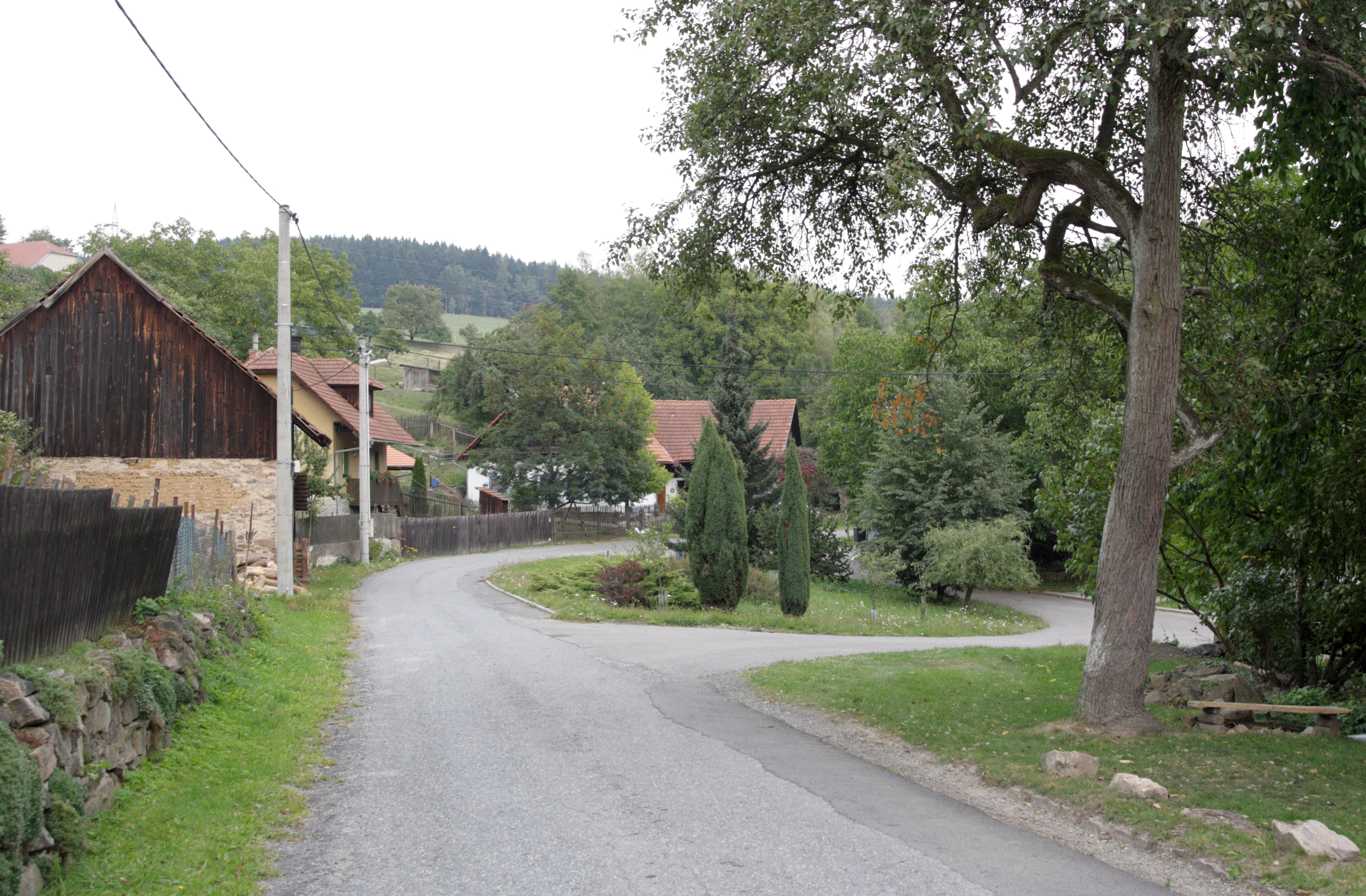
- Centre of Moravecké Pavlovice

- Flag Coat of arms

- Location in the Czech Republic
- Coordinates: 49°25′32″N 16°15′23″E
- Country: Czech Republic
- Region: Vysočina
- District: Žďár nad Sázavou
- First mentioned: 1350

Area
  - Total: 4.82 km^{2} (1.86 sq mi)
- Elevation: 524 m (1,719 ft)

Population (2026-01-01)
  - Total: 52
  - Density: 11/km^{2} (28/sq mi)
- Time zone: UTC+1 (CET)
  - Summer (DST): UTC+2 (CEST)
- Postal code: 592 62
- Website: www.moraveckepavlovice.cz

Moravecké Pavlovice is a municipality and village in Žďár nad Sázavou District in the Vysočina Region of the Czech Republic. It has about 50 inhabitants.

Moravecké Pavlovice lies approximately 28 kilometres (17 mi) south-east of Žďár nad Sázavou, 49 km (30 mi) east of Jihlava, and 152 km (94 mi) south-east of Prague.

== Administrative division ==
Moravecké Pavlovice consists of two municipal parts (in brackets population according to the 2021 census):

- Moravecké Pavlovice (24)
- Habří (20)

== Demographics ==
Historical population
Year	Pop.	±%
1869	378	—
1880	317	−16.1%
1890	320	+0.9%
1900	306	−4.4%
1910	271	−11.4%
1921	306	+12.9%
1930	222	−27.5%
1950	153	−31.1%
1961	139	−9.2%
1970	119	−14.4%
1980	91	−23.5%
1991	65	−28.6%
2001	55	−15.4%
2011	49	−10.9%
2021	44	−10.2%
Source: Censuses
