= Skryje (Havlíčkův Brod District) =

- Municipality
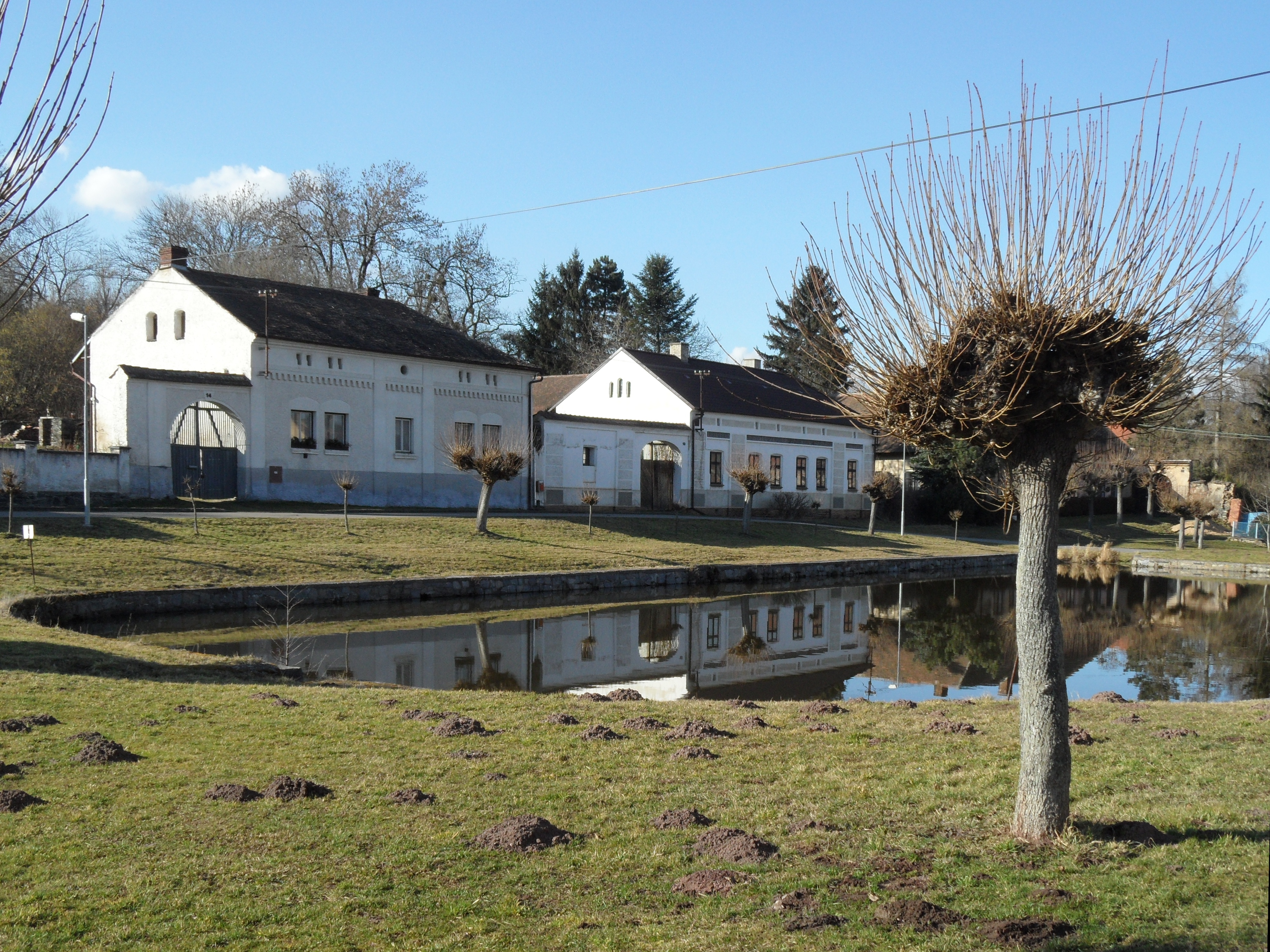
- Centre of Skryje

- Location in the Czech Republic
- Coordinates: 49°50′35″N 15°29′13″E
- Country: Czech Republic
- Region: Vysočina
- District: Havlíčkův Brod
- First mentioned: 1464

Area
  - Total: 4.17 km^{2} (1.61 sq mi)
- Elevation: 298 m (978 ft)

Population (2026-01-01)
  - Total: 201
  - Density: 48.2/km^{2} (125/sq mi)
- Time zone: UTC+1 (CET)
  - Summer (DST): UTC+2 (CEST)
- Postal code: 582 82
- Website: www.obec-skryje.cz

Skryje is a municipality and village in Havlíčkův Brod District in the Vysočina Region of the Czech Republic. It has about 200 inhabitants.

Skryje lies approximately 28 kilometres (17 mi) north of Havlíčkův Brod, 51 km (32 mi) north of Jihlava, and 82 km (51 mi) east of Prague.

== Administrative division ==
Skryje consists of three municipal parts (in brackets population according to the 2021 census):

- Skryje (80)
- Chrastice (15)
- Hostačov (78)

== Demographics ==
Historical population
Year	Pop.	±%
1869	542	—
1880	529	−2.4%
1890	563	+6.4%
1900	581	+3.2%
1910	499	−14.1%
1921	478	−4.2%
1930	542	+13.4%
1950	405	−25.3%
1961	242	−40.2%
1970	206	−14.9%
1980	227	+10.2%
1991	214	−5.7%
2001	194	−9.3%
2011	180	−7.2%
2021	173	−3.9%
Source: Censuses
