= Mirošov (Žďár nad Sázavou District) =

- Municipality
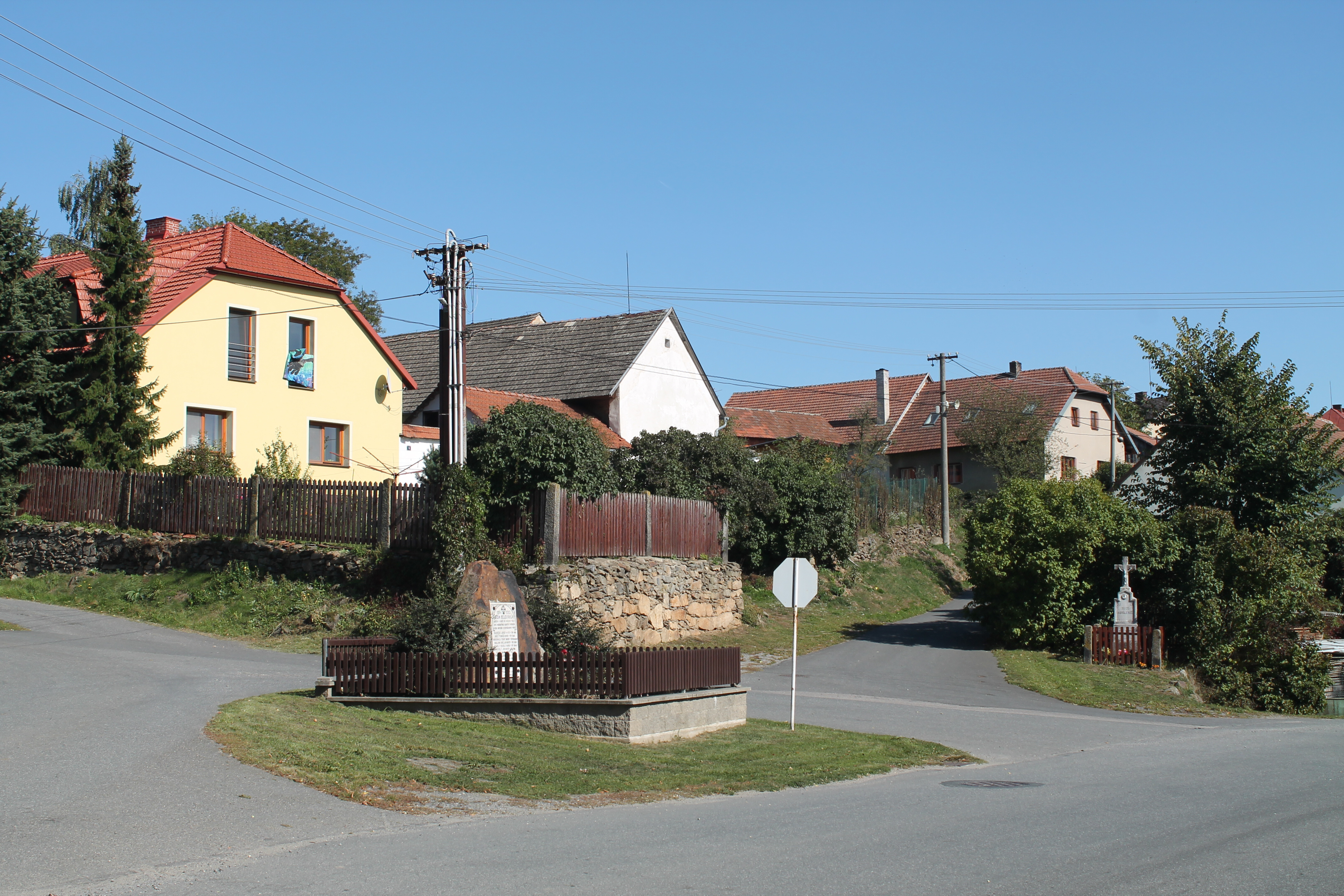
- Centre of Mirošov

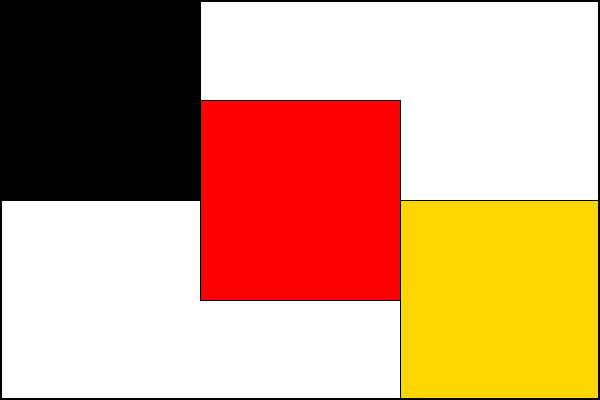
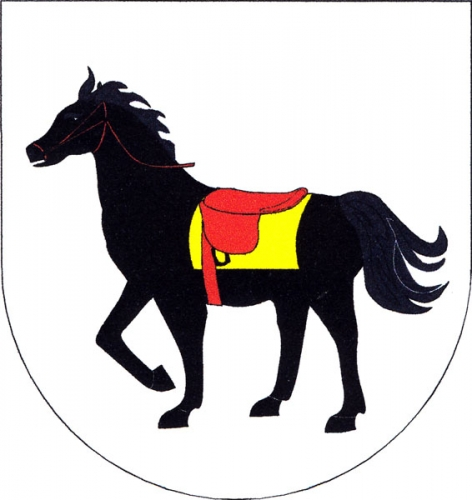
- Flag Coat of arms

- Location in the Czech Republic
- Coordinates: 49°27′56″N 16°9′20″E
- Country: Czech Republic
- Region: Vysočina
- District: Žďár nad Sázavou
- First mentioned: 1338

Area
  - Total: 6.85 km^{2} (2.64 sq mi)
- Elevation: 494 m (1,621 ft)

Population (2026-01-01)
  - Total: 142
  - Density: 20.7/km^{2} (53.7/sq mi)
- Time zone: UTC+1 (CET)
  - Summer (DST): UTC+2 (CEST)
- Postal code: 592 55
- Website: www.obec-mirosov.cz

Mirošov is a municipality and village in Žďár nad Sázavou District in the Vysočina Region of the Czech Republic. It has about 100 inhabitants.

Mirošov lies approximately 20 kilometres (12 mi) south-east of Žďár nad Sázavou, 42 km (26 mi) east of Jihlava, and 143 km (89 mi) south-east of Prague.

== Demographics ==
Historical population
Year	Pop.	±%
1869	330	—
1880	347	+5.2%
1890	358	+3.2%
1900	395	+10.3%
1910	421	+6.6%
1921	382	−9.3%
1930	348	−8.9%
1950	272	−21.8%
1961	277	+1.8%
1970	217	−21.7%
1980	203	−6.5%
1991	161	−20.7%
2001	133	−17.4%
2011	132	−0.8%
2021	121	−8.3%
Source: Censuses
