= Blažkov =

- Municipality
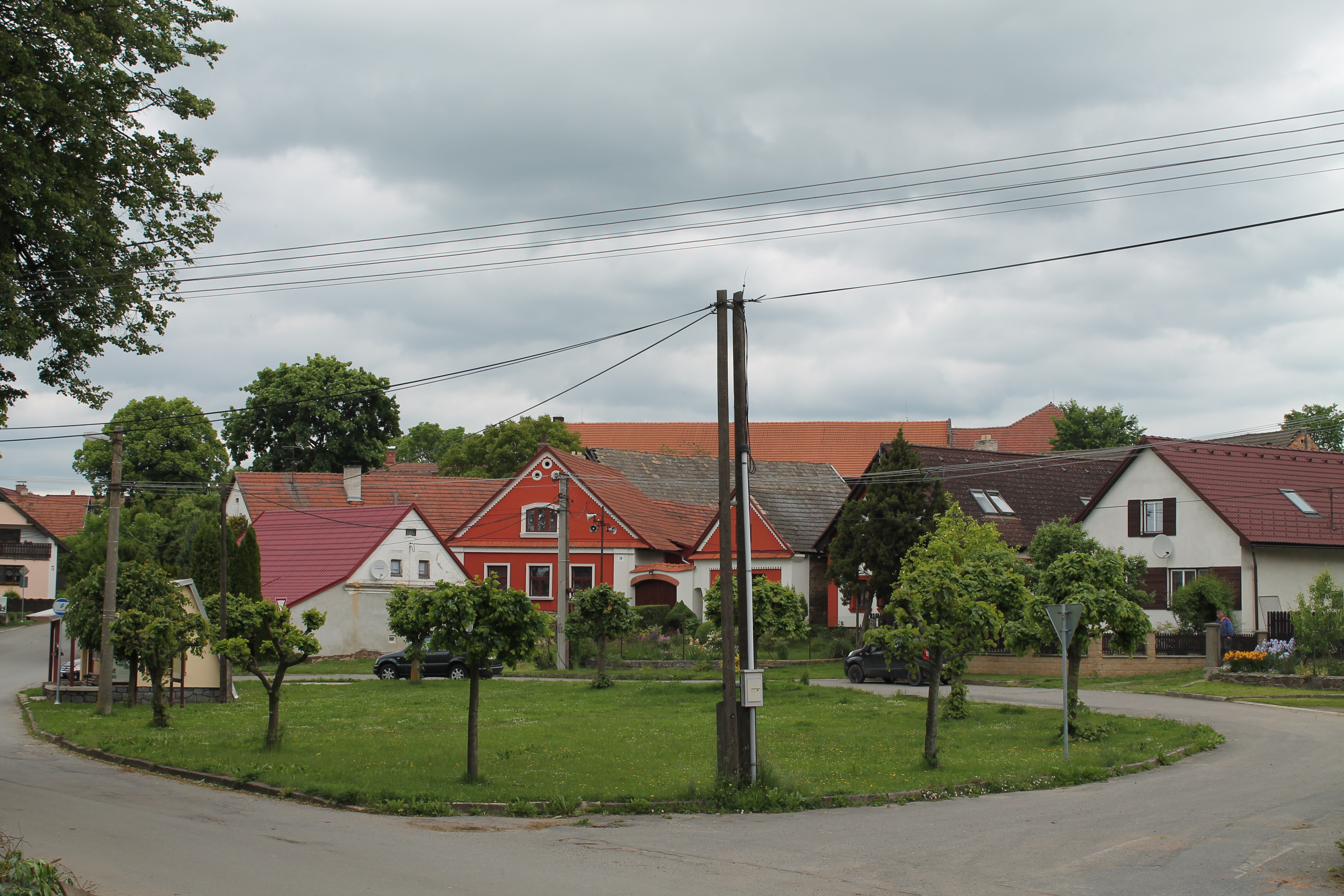
- Centre of Blažkov

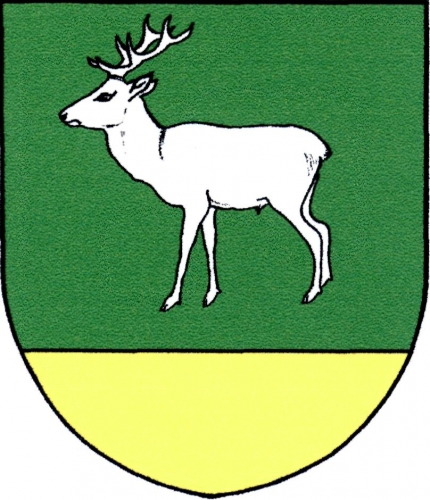
- Flag Coat of arms

- Location in the Czech Republic
- Coordinates: 49°28′23″N 16°11′7″E
- Country: Czech Republic
- Region: Vysočina
- District: Žďár nad Sázavou
- First mentioned: 1348

Area
  - Total: 7.43 km^{2} (2.87 sq mi)
- Elevation: 515 m (1,690 ft)

Population (2026-01-01)
  - Total: 271
  - Density: 36.5/km^{2} (94.5/sq mi)
- Time zone: UTC+1 (CET)
  - Summer (DST): UTC+2 (CEST)
- Postal code: 592 51
- Website: www.blazkov.cz

Blažkov is a municipality and village in Žďár nad Sázavou District in the Vysočina Region of the Czech Republic. It has about 300 inhabitants.

Blažkov lies approximately 21 kilometres (13 mi) south-east of Žďár nad Sázavou, 45 km (28 mi) east of Jihlava, and 145 km (90 mi) south-east of Prague.

== Administrative division ==
Blažkov consists of two municipal parts (in brackets population according to the 2021 census):

- Blažkov (188)
- Dolní Rozsíčka (85)

== Demographics ==
Historical population
Year	Pop.	±%
1869	527	—
1880	480	−8.9%
1890	502	+4.6%
1900	453	−9.8%
1910	403	−11.0%
1921	391	−3.0%
1930	370	−5.4%
1950	272	−26.5%
1961	301	+10.7%
1970	272	−9.6%
1980	311	+14.3%
1991	296	−4.8%
2001	304	+2.7%
2011	282	−7.2%
2021	273	−3.2%
Source: Censuses
