= Drahonín =

- Municipality
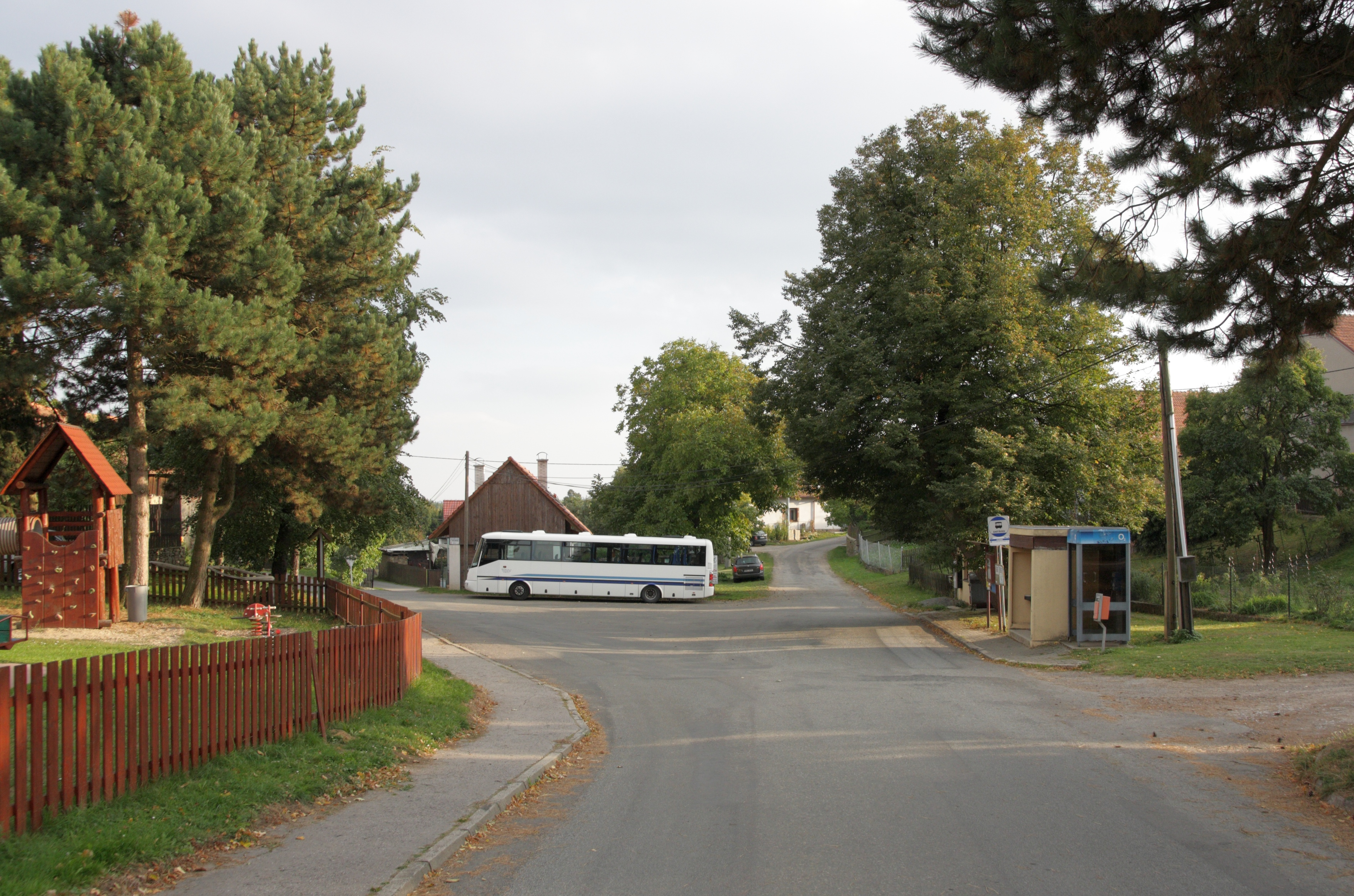
- Centre of Drahonín

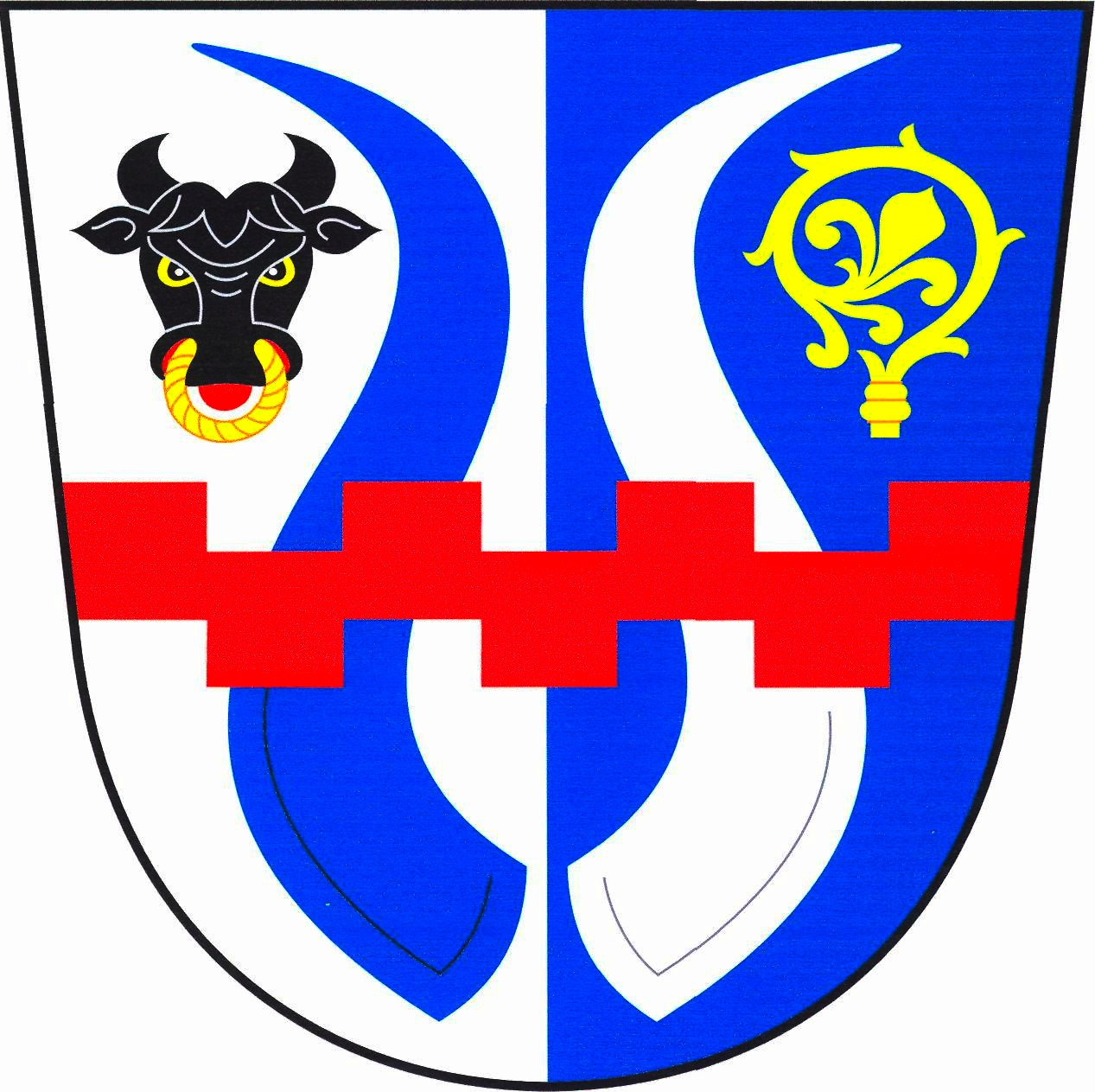
- Flag Coat of arms

- Location in the Czech Republic
- Coordinates: 49°24′51″N 16°16′37″E
- Country: Czech Republic
- Region: South Moravian
- District: Brno-Country
- First mentioned: 1208

Area
  - Total: 6.69 km^{2} (2.58 sq mi)
- Elevation: 517 m (1,696 ft)

Population (2026-01-01)
  - Total: 110
  - Density: 16/km^{2} (43/sq mi)
- Time zone: UTC+1 (CET)
  - Summer (DST): UTC+2 (CEST)
- Postal code: 592 61
- Website: www.drahonin.cz

Drahonín is a municipality and village in Brno-Country District in the South Moravian Region of the Czech Republic. It has about 100 inhabitants.

Drahonín lies approximately 35 kilometres (22 mi) north-west of Brno and 153 km (95 mi) south-east of Prague.

== Demographics ==
Historical population
Year	Pop.	±%
1869	311	—
1880	309	−0.6%
1890	305	−1.3%
1900	279	−8.5%
1910	264	−5.4%
1921	276	+4.5%
1930	275	−0.4%
1950	200	−27.3%
1961	181	−9.5%
1970	170	−6.1%
1980	142	−16.5%
1991	130	−8.5%
2001	119	−8.5%
2011	119	+0.0%
2021	121	+1.7%
Source: Censuses
