= Podolí (Žďár nad Sázavou District) =

- Municipality
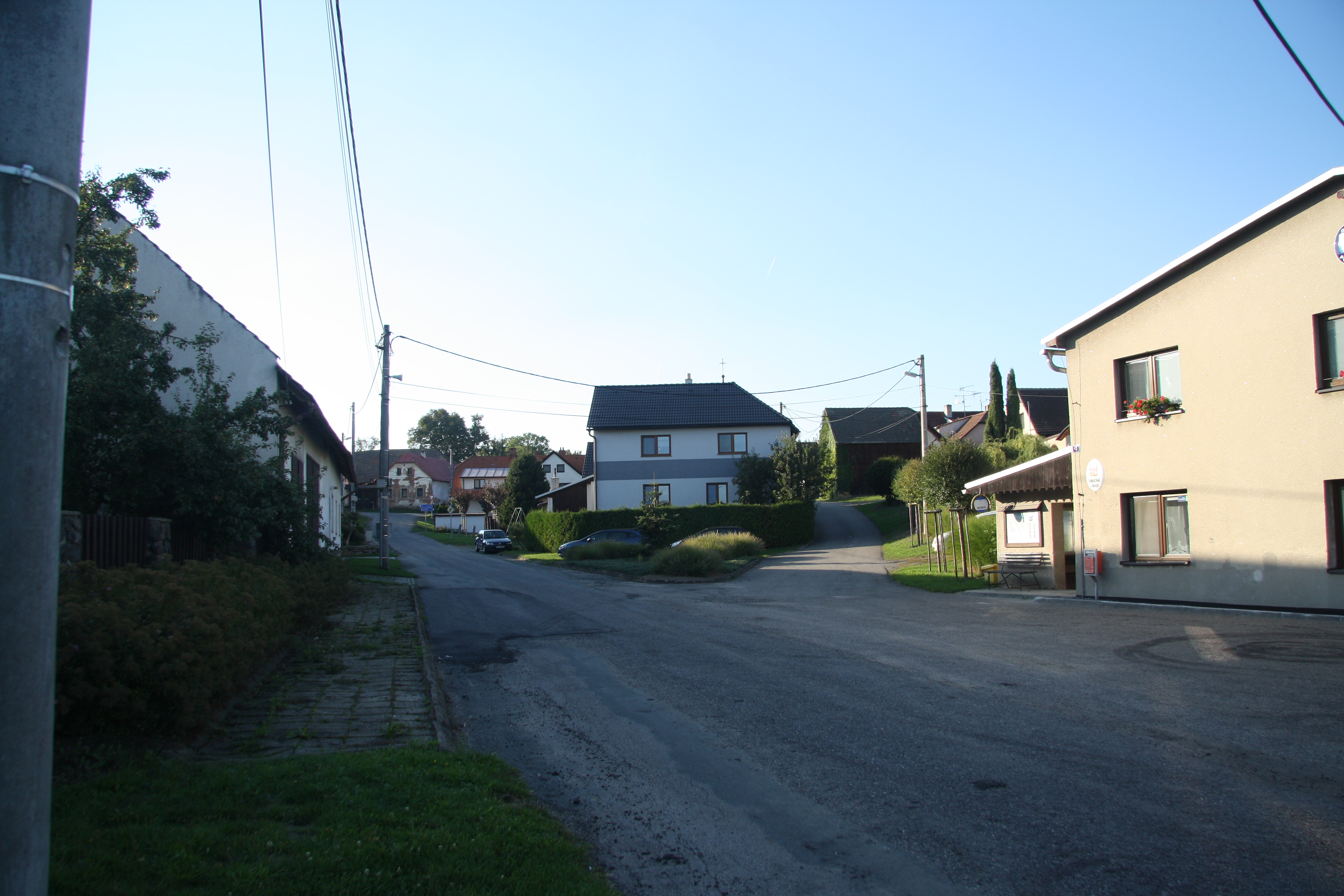
- Centre of Podolí

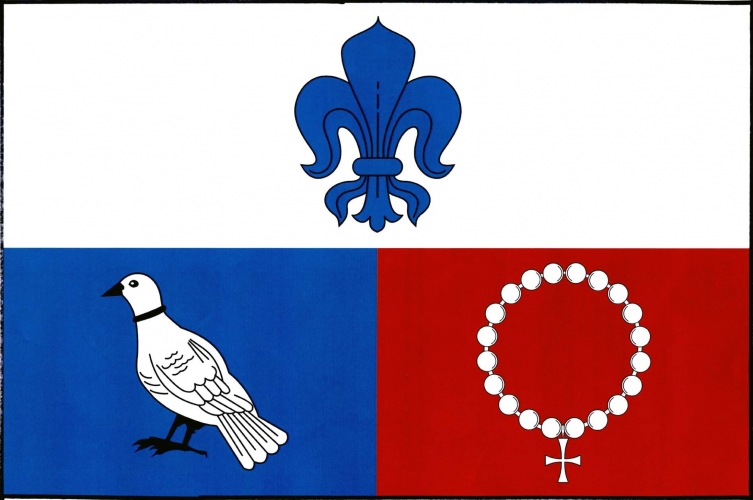
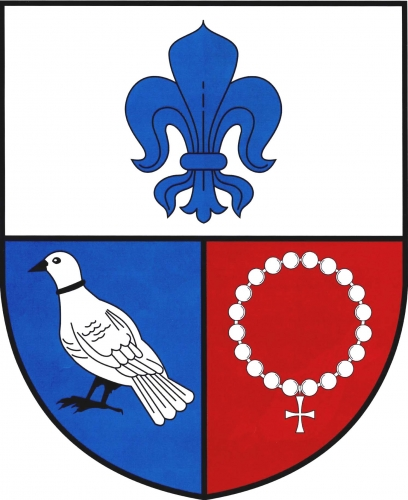
- Flag Coat of arms

- Location in the Czech Republic
- Coordinates: 49°29′3″N 16°4′50″E
- Country: Czech Republic
- Region: Vysočina
- District: Žďár nad Sázavou
- First mentioned: 1333

Area
  - Total: 2.51 km^{2} (0.97 sq mi)
- Elevation: 532 m (1,745 ft)

Population (2026-01-01)
  - Total: 97
  - Density: 39/km^{2} (100/sq mi)
- Time zone: UTC+1 (CET)
  - Summer (DST): UTC+2 (CEST)
- Postal code: 592 55
- Website: obecpodoli.net

Podolí is a municipality and village in Žďár nad Sázavou District in the Vysočina Region of the Czech Republic. It has about 100 inhabitants.

Podolí lies approximately 14 kilometres (9 mi) south-east of Žďár nad Sázavou, 37 km (23 mi) east of Jihlava, and 137 km (85 mi) south-east of Prague.

== Demographics ==
Historical population
Year	Pop.	±%
1869	178	—
1880	186	+4.5%
1890	163	−12.4%
1900	163	+0.0%
1910	165	+1.2%
1921	167	+1.2%
1930	166	−0.6%
1950	138	−16.9%
1961	147	+6.5%
1970	130	−11.6%
1980	115	−11.5%
1991	100	−13.0%
2001	101	+1.0%
2011	83	−17.8%
2021	88	+6.0%
Source: Censuses
