= Horní Loučky =

- Municipality
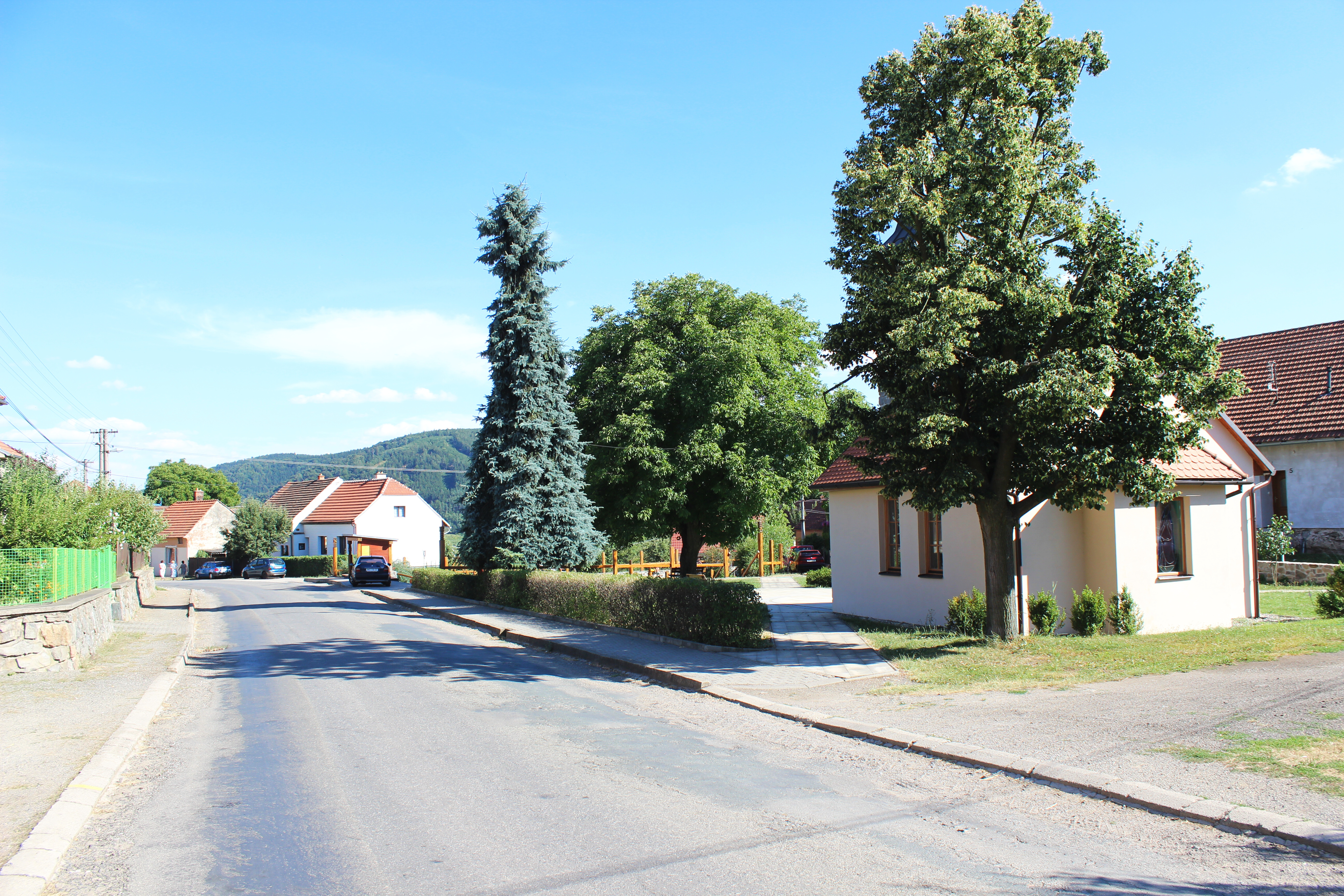
- Centre of Horní Loučky

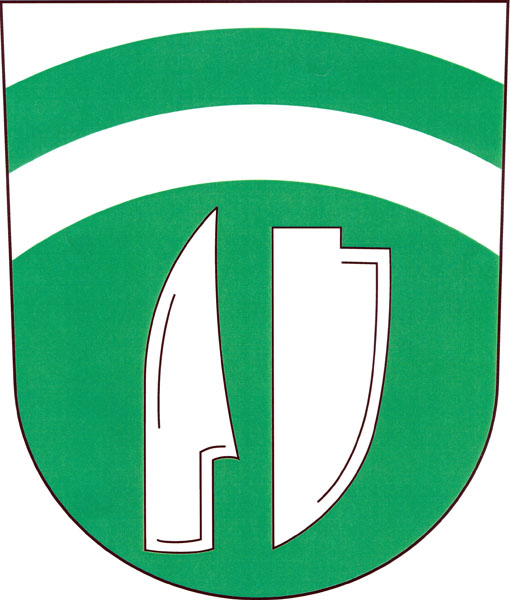
- Flag Coat of arms

- Location in the Czech Republic
- Coordinates: 49°22′0″N 16°20′29″E
- Country: Czech Republic
- Region: South Moravian
- District: Brno-Country
- First mentioned: 1353

Area
  - Total: 4.18 km^{2} (1.61 sq mi)
- Elevation: 340 m (1,120 ft)

Population (2026-01-01)
  - Total: 314
  - Density: 75.1/km^{2} (195/sq mi)
- Time zone: UTC+1 (CET)
  - Summer (DST): UTC+2 (CEST)
- Postal code: 594 55
- Website: www.horniloucky.cz

Horní Loučky is a municipality and village in Brno-Country District in the South Moravian Region of the Czech Republic. It has about 300 inhabitants.

Horní Loučky lies approximately 29 kilometres (18 mi) north-west of Brno and 159 km (99 mi) south-east of Prague.

== History ==
The first written mention of Horní Loučky is from 1353.

== Demographics ==
Historical population
Year	Pop.	±%
1869	280	—
1880	343	+22.5%
1890	321	−6.4%
1900	305	−5.0%
1910	316	+3.6%
1921	334	+5.7%
1930	352	+5.4%
1950	361	+2.6%
1961	381	+5.5%
1970	373	−2.1%
1980	306	−18.0%
1991	283	−7.5%
2001	290	+2.5%
2011	303	+4.5%
2021	299	−1.3%
Source: Censuses
