= Tišnovská Nová Ves =

- Municipality
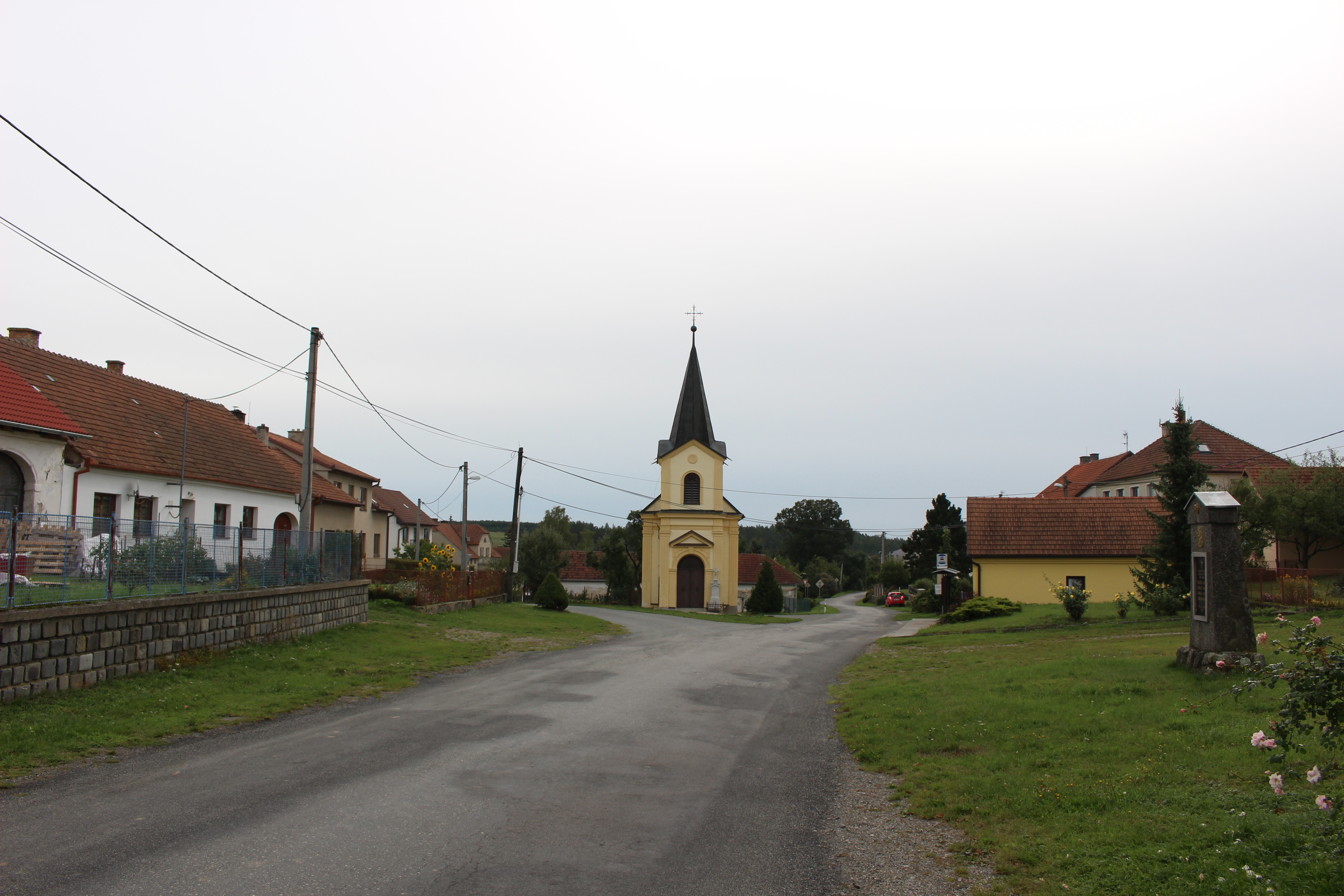
- Centre of the village with the Chapel of the Assumption of the Virgin Mary

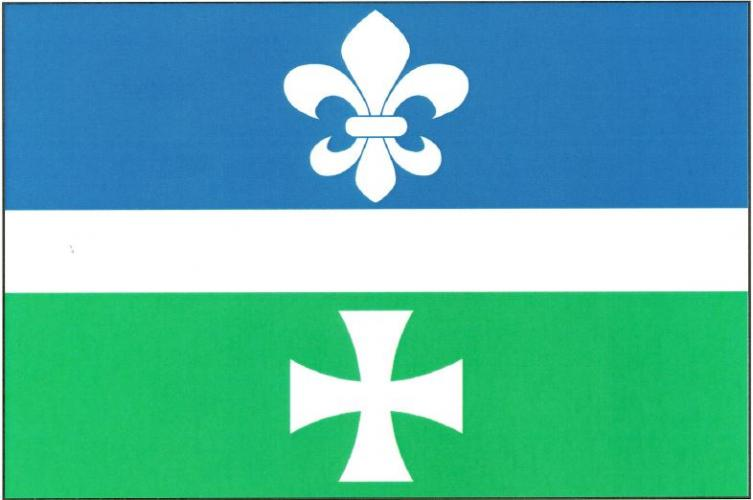
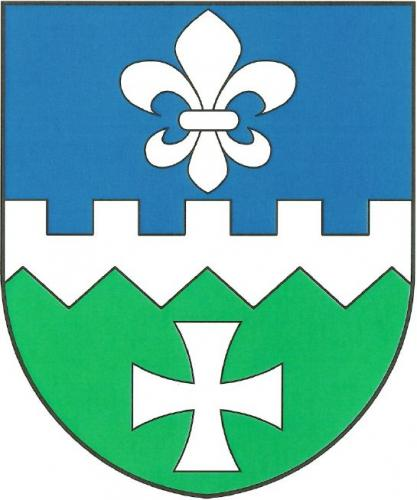
- Flag Coat of arms

- Location in the Czech Republic
- Coordinates: 49°23′2″N 16°17′37″E
- Country: Czech Republic
- Region: South Moravian
- District: Brno-Country
- First mentioned: 1358

Area
  - Total: 4.25 km^{2} (1.64 sq mi)
- Elevation: 431 m (1,414 ft)

Population (2026-01-01)
  - Total: 98
  - Density: 23/km^{2} (60/sq mi)
- Time zone: UTC+1 (CET)
  - Summer (DST): UTC+2 (CEST)
- Postal code: 594 51
- Website: tisnovskanovaves.cz

Tišnovská Nová Ves is a municipality and village in Brno-Country District in the South Moravian Region of the Czech Republic. It has about 100 inhabitants.

Tišnovská Nová Ves lies approximately 31 kilometres (19 mi) north-west of Brno and 156 km (97 mi) south-east of Prague.

== Demographics ==
Historical population
Year	Pop.	±%
1869	210	—
1880	235	+11.9%
1890	241	+2.6%
1900	218	−9.5%
1910	193	−11.5%
1921	230	+19.2%
1930	201	−12.6%
1950	137	−31.8%
1961	114	−16.8%
1970	100	−12.3%
1980	90	−10.0%
1991	72	−20.0%
2001	70	−2.8%
2011	69	−1.4%
2021	101	+46.4%
Source: Censuses
