= Vlachovice (Žďár nad Sázavou District) =

- Municipality
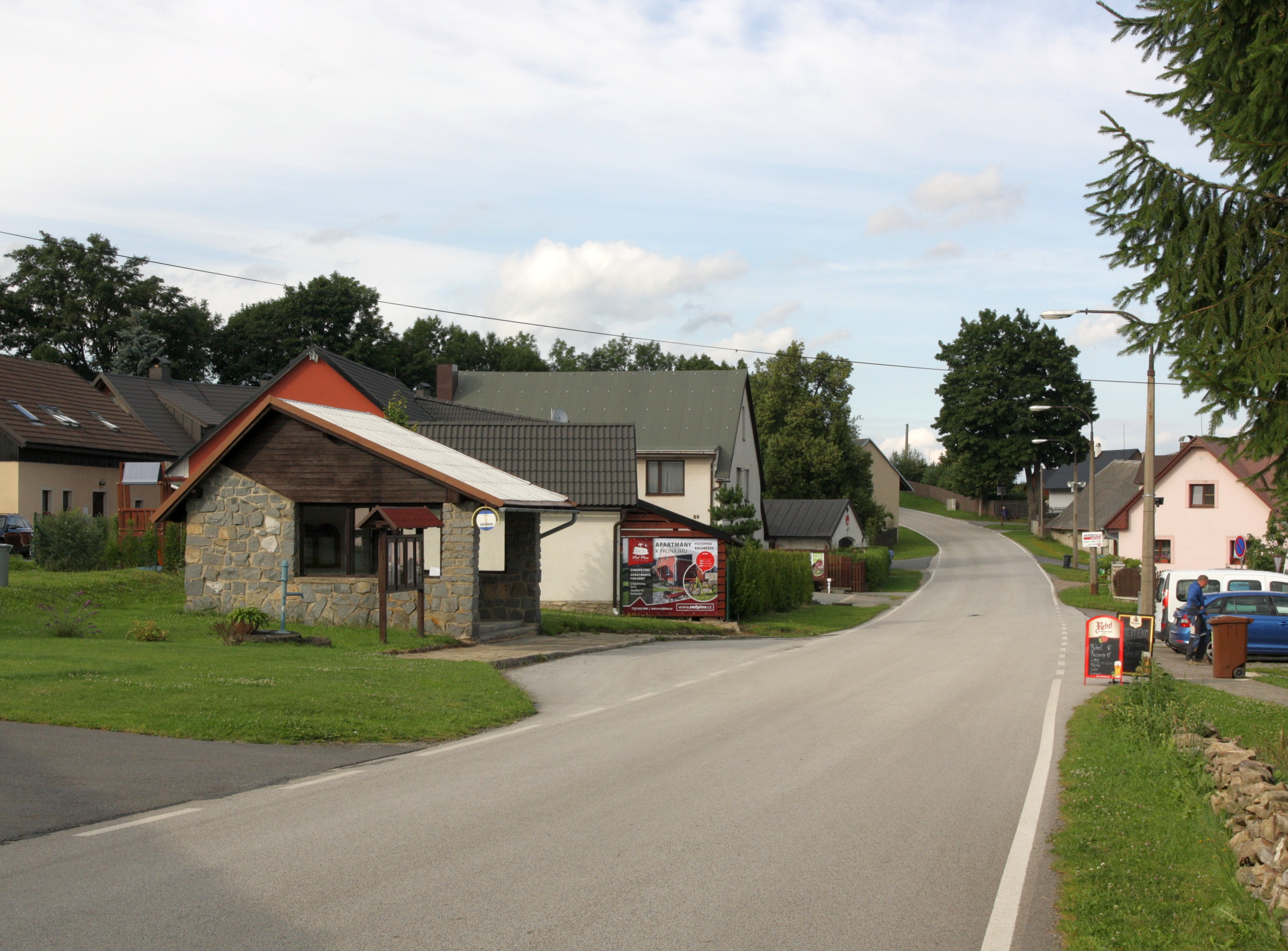
- Centre of Vlachovice

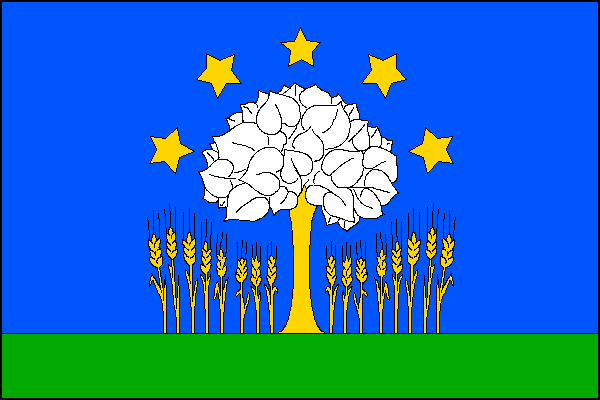
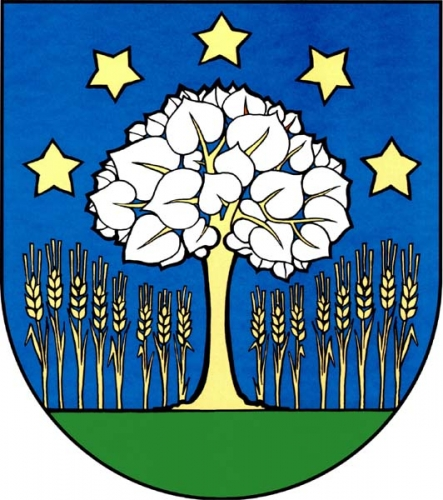
- Flag Coat of arms

- Location in the Czech Republic
- Coordinates: 49°35′49″N 16°2′28″E
- Country: Czech Republic
- Region: Vysočina
- District: Žďár nad Sázavou
- First mentioned: 1496

Area
  - Total: 3.62 km^{2} (1.40 sq mi)
- Elevation: 754 m (2,474 ft)

Population (2026-01-01)
  - Total: 128
  - Density: 35.4/km^{2} (91.6/sq mi)
- Time zone: UTC+1 (CET)
  - Summer (DST): UTC+2 (CEST)
- Postal code: 592 31
- Website: www.vlachovice-nm.cz

Vlachovice (German: Wlachowitz) is a municipality and village in Žďár nad Sázavou District in the Vysočina Region of the Czech Republic. It has about 100 inhabitants.

Vlachovice lies approximately 8 kilometres (5 mi) north-east of Žďár nad Sázavou, 40 km (25 mi) north-east of Jihlava, and 129 km (80 mi) south-east of Prague.

== Demographics ==
Historical population
Year	Pop.	±%
1869	274	—
1880	263	−4.0%
1890	244	−7.2%
1900	230	−5.7%
1910	243	+5.7%
1921	226	−7.0%
1930	206	−8.8%
1950	167	−18.9%
1961	147	−12.0%
1970	180	+22.4%
1980	144	−20.0%
1991	117	−18.8%
2001	120	+2.6%
2011	120	+0.0%
2021	139	+15.8%
Source: Censuses
