= Skryje (Brno-Country District) =

- Municipality
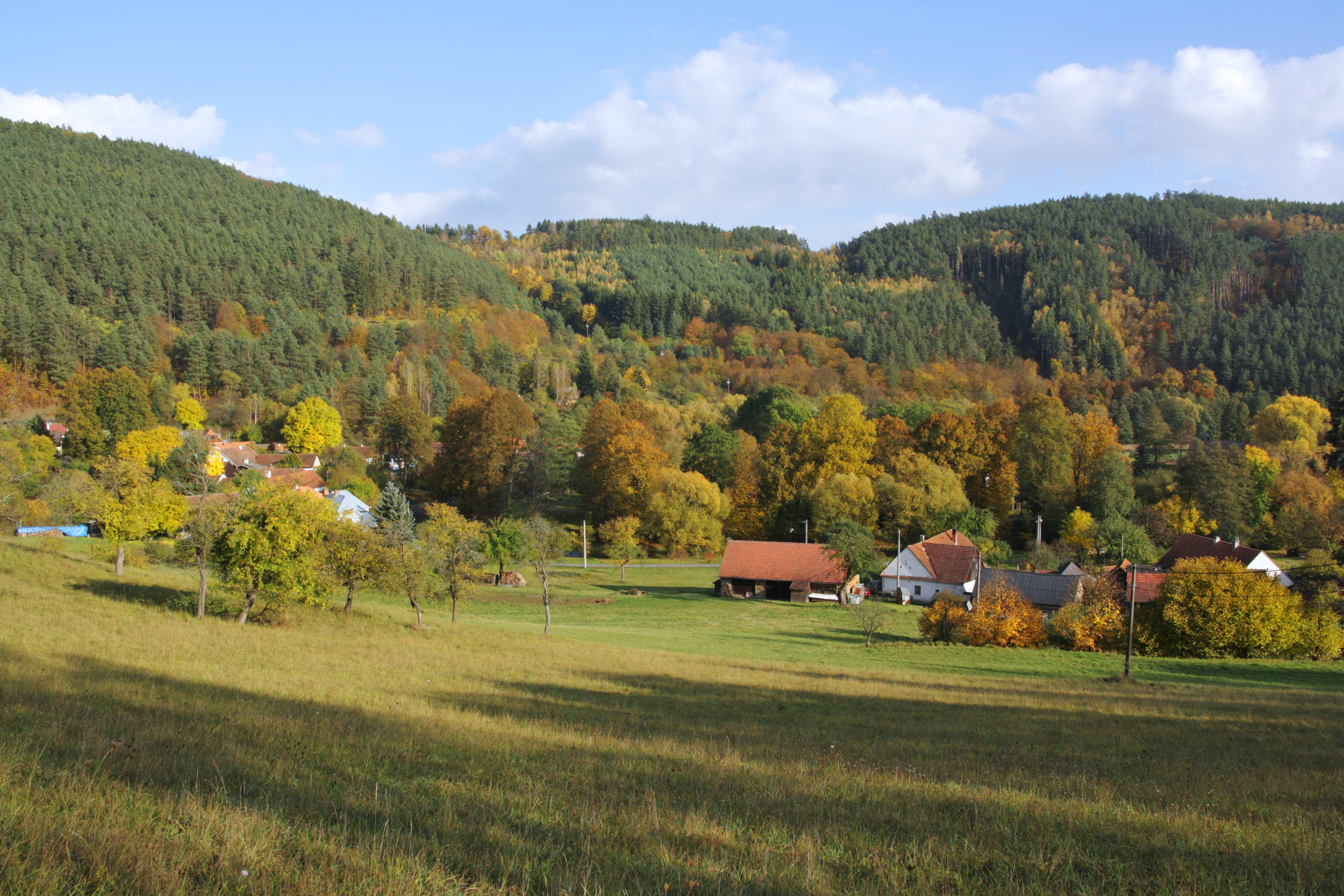
- View from the west

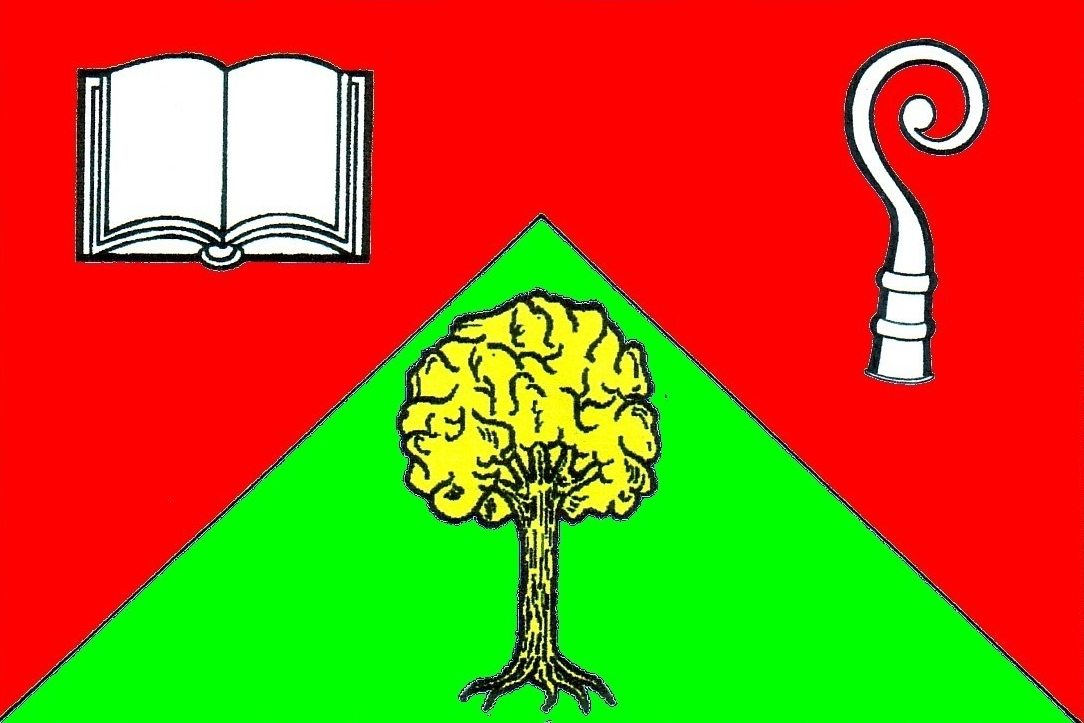
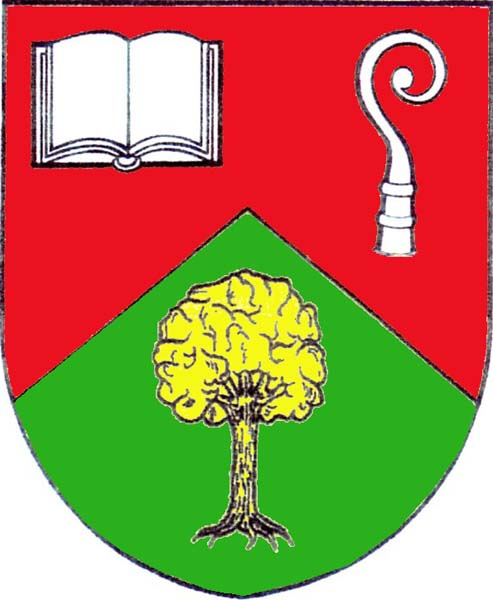
- Flag Coat of arms

- Location in the Czech Republic
- Coordinates: 49°23′37″N 16°18′39″E
- Country: Czech Republic
- Region: South Moravian
- District: Brno-Country
- First mentioned: 1368

Area
  - Total: 2.21 km^{2} (0.85 sq mi)
- Elevation: 332 m (1,089 ft)

Population (2026-01-01)
  - Total: 71
  - Density: 32/km^{2} (83/sq mi)
- Time zone: UTC+1 (CET)
  - Summer (DST): UTC+2 (CEST)
- Postal code: 594 55
- Website: www.obecskryje.cz

Skryje is a municipality and village in Brno-Country District in the South Moravian Region of the Czech Republic. It has about 70 inhabitants.

Skryje lies approximately 31 kilometres (19 mi) north-west of Brno and 157 km (98 mi) south-east of Prague.

== Administrative division ==
Skryje consists of two municipal parts (in brackets population according to the 2021 census):

- Skryje (66)
- Boudy (4)

== Demographics ==
Historical population
| Year | Pop. | ±% |
|---|---|---|
| 1869 | 205 | — |
| 1880 | 240 | +17.1% |
| 1890 | 198 | −17.5% |
| 1900 | 205 | +3.5% |
| 1910 | 216 | +5.4% |
| 1921 | 193 | −10.6% |
| 1930 | 176 | −8.8% |
| 1950 | 175 | −0.6% |
| 1961 | 155 | −11.4% |
| 1970 | 142 | −8.4% |
| 1980 | 113 | −20.4% |
| 1991 | 68 | −39.8% |
| 2001 | 69 | +1.5% |
| 2011 | 52 | −24.6% |
| 2021 | 70 | +34.6% |
Source: Censuses
