= Radešínská Svratka =

- Municipality
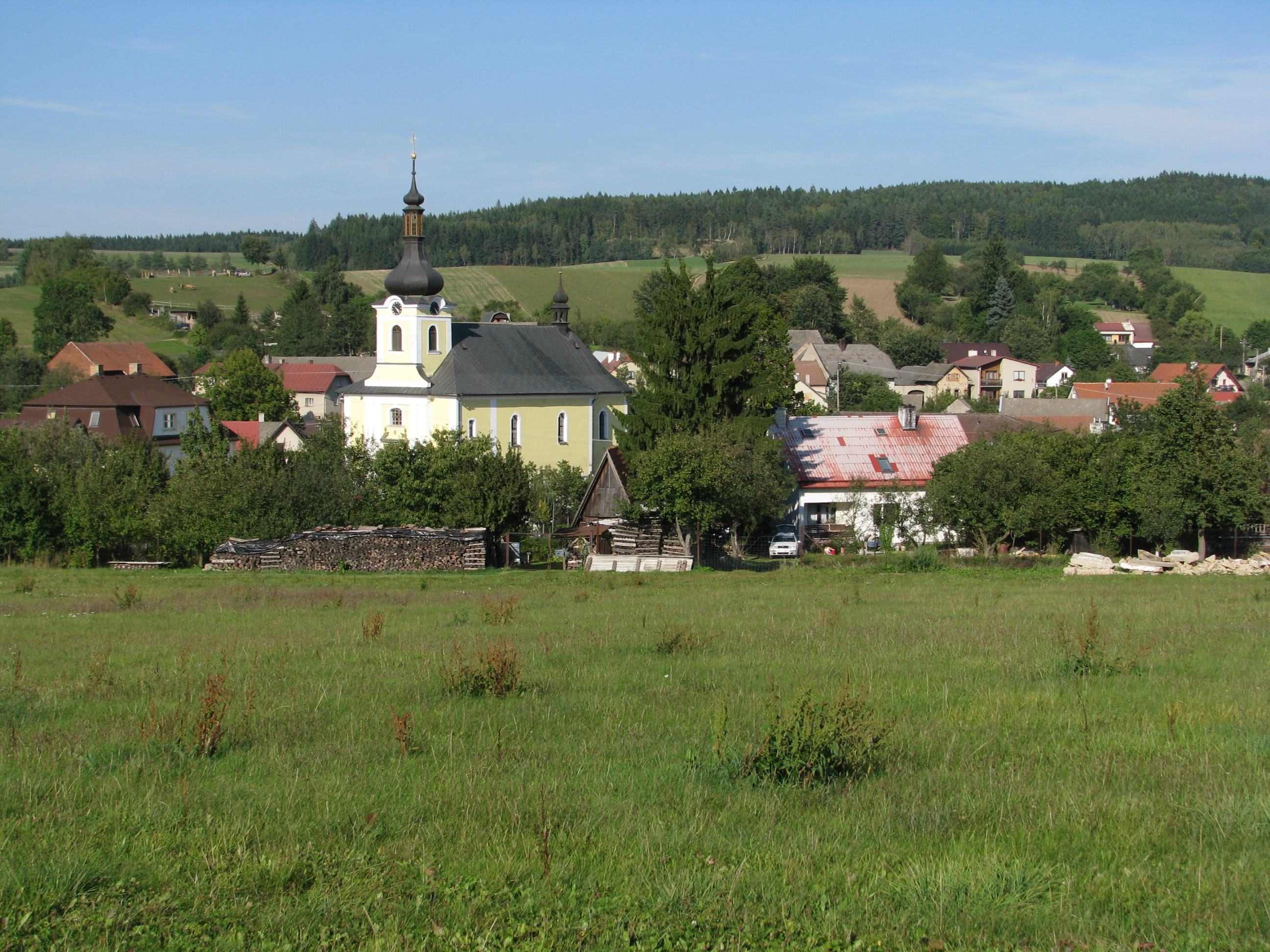
- General view

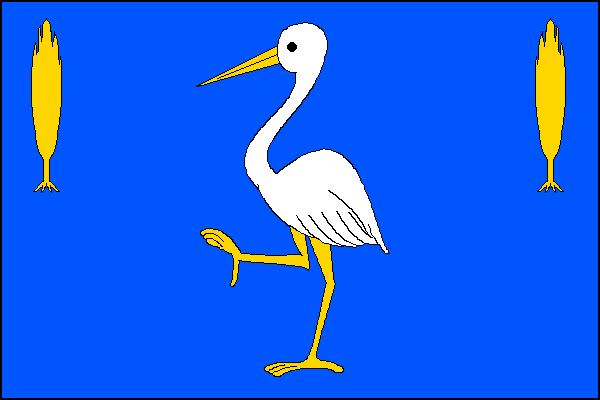
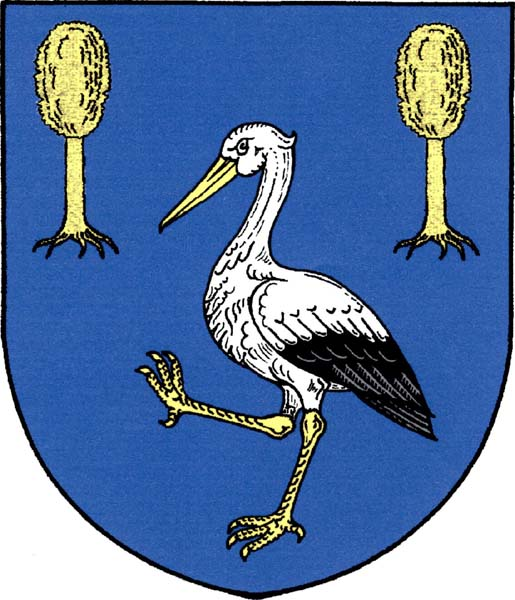
- Flag Coat of arms

- Location in the Czech Republic
- Coordinates: 49°30′31″N 16°5′6″E
- Country: Czech Republic
- Region: Vysočina
- District: Žďár nad Sázavou
- First mentioned: 1290

Area
  - Total: 6.99 km^{2} (2.70 sq mi)
- Elevation: 520 m (1,710 ft)

Population (2026-01-01)
  - Total: 616
  - Density: 88.1/km^{2} (228/sq mi)
- Time zone: UTC+1 (CET)
  - Summer (DST): UTC+2 (CEST)
- Postal code: 592 33
- Website: www.radesinskasvratka.cz

Radešínská Svratka is a municipality and village Žďár nad Sázavou District in the Vysočina Region of the Czech Republic. It has about 600 inhabitants.

Radešínská Svratka lies approximately 13 kilometres (8 mi) south-east of Žďár nad Sázavou, 38 kilometres (24 mi) east of Jihlava, and 136 kilometres (85 mi) south-east of Prague.

== Demographics ==
Historical population
Year	Pop.	±%
1869	703	—
1880	672	−4.4%
1890	665	−1.0%
1900	654	−1.7%
1910	639	−2.3%
1921	613	−4.1%
1930	648	+5.7%
1950	527	−18.7%
1961	554	+5.1%
1970	551	−0.5%
1980	532	−3.4%
1991	535	+0.6%
2001	579	+8.2%
2011	601	+3.8%
2021	599	−0.3%
Source: Censuses
