= List of rivers of the Czech Republic =

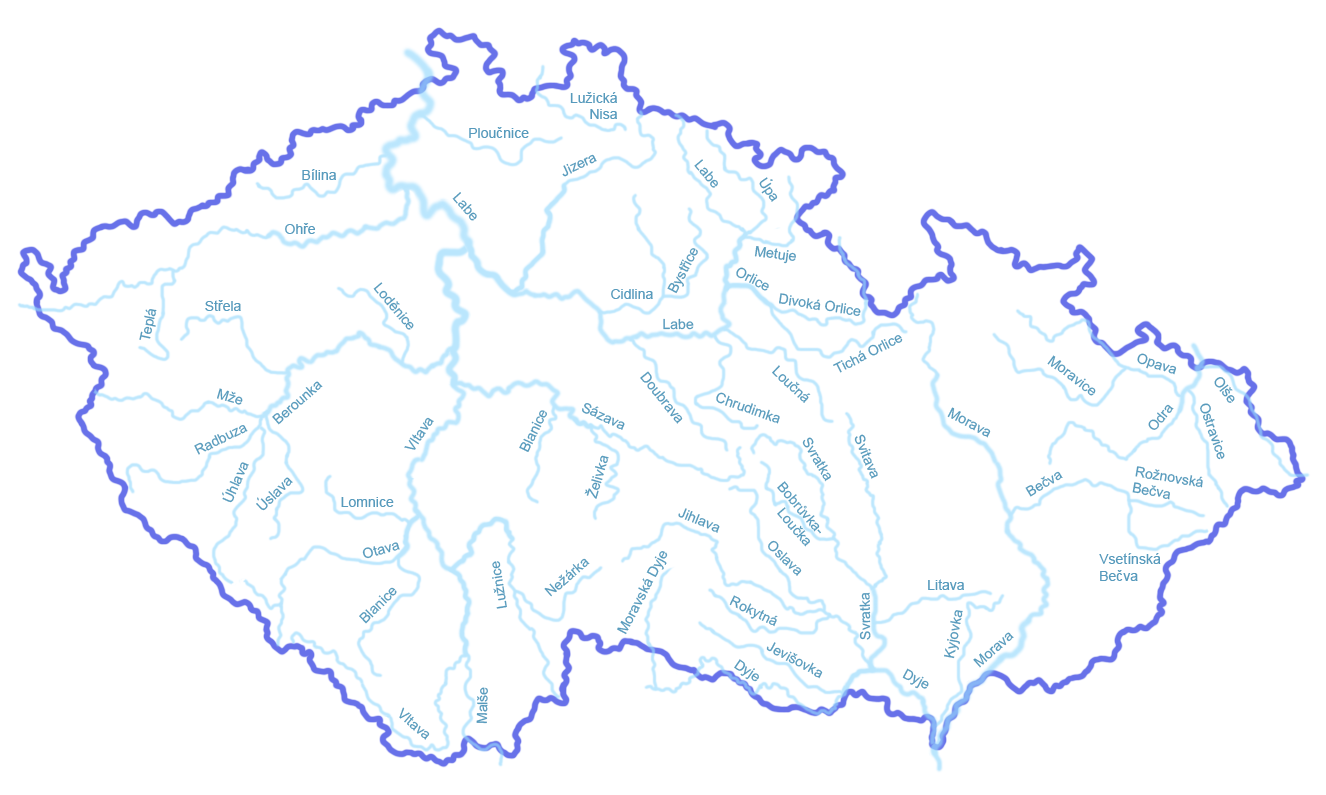
Map of the 50 longest rivers of the Czech Republic

This is a list of rivers of the Czech Republic.

== Naming conventions ==
Czech language distinguishes between large (river; in Czech řeka) and small (stream, creek, brook; in Czech potok) watercourses. River names are mostly self-standing one-word nouns. Stream names often consist of two words because they contain an adjective (usually stemming from physical properties (e.g. Černý potok – "black stream"), usage (e.g. Mlýnský potok – "mill stream") or derived from the location through which it flows (e.g. Rakovnický potok – "Rakovník stream"). These two-word names form an inseparable whole.

== Main rivers ==
While the Elbe is the longest Czech-related river when measured through its overall length (i.e. including its lower course in Germany), its tributary the Vltava surpasses it as the longest river within the territory of the Czech Republic itself. (In fact the Vltava also carries more water than the Elbe at their confluence.)

Rank	River	Length within the CR (km)	Avg. discharge (Note: at mouth (if within the Czech Republic) or at national border) (m³/s)	Total basin (km^{2})	Tributary to	Mouth location
1	Vltava (+Teplá Vltava)	431 (Note: Total length of the Vltava and Elbe courses combined within Czech territory is 530 km.)	151	28,090	Elbe	Mělník
2	Elbe	370 (Note: Total length of the Elbe (including the territory of Germany) is 1165 km.)	308	144,055	North Sea	Cuxhaven (Germany)
3	Morava	269 (Note: Total length of the Morava (including the territory of Slovakia and Austria) is 352 km.)	65 (Note: before the confluence with the Thaya)	26,658	Danube	Bratislava (Slovakia)
4	Ohře	256 (Note: Total length of the Ohře (including the territory of Germany) is 305 km.)	38	5,606	Elbe	Litoměřice
5	Berounka (+Mže)	242 (Note: Total length of the Berounka (including the territory of Germany) is 245 km.)	36	8,854	Vltava	Prague
6	Sázava	225	25	4,350	Vltava	Davle
7	Thaya	196 (Note: Total length of the Thaya (including the territory of Austria and Deutsche Thaya) is 311 km.)	44	13,419	Morava	Lanžhot
8	Jihlava	181	12	2,997	Svratka	Ivaň
9	Svratka	174	15 (Note: before confluence with the Jihlava)	7,119	Thaya	Pouzdřany
10	Jizera	167	24	2,193	Elbe	Lázně Toušeň
11	Lužnice	158 (Note: Total length of the Lužnice (including the territory of Austria) is 198 km.)	24	4,235	Vltava	Hosty
12	Oder	136 (Note: Total length of the Oder (including the territory of Poland and Germany) is 861 km.)	48	118,861	Baltic Sea	Świnoujście (Poland)
13	Otava (+Vydra)	135	26	3,827	Vltava	Zvíkovské Podhradí
14	Orlice (+Divoká Orlice)	129 (Note: Total length of the Orlice (including the territory of Poland) is 132 km.)	22	2,036	Elbe	Hradec Králové
15	Opava (+Černá Opava)	129	18	2,089	Oder	Ostrava
16	Bečva (+Vsetínská Bečva)	120	18	1,626	Morava	Troubky
17	Radbuza	110	11	2,182	Berounka	Plzeň
18	Chrudimka	106	6	866	Elbe	Pardubice
19	Úhlava	104	6	908	Radbuza	Plzeň
20	Želivka (+Hejlovka)	104	4	1,188	Sázava	Soutice
21	Tichá Orlice	102	7	756	Orlice	Žďár nad Orlicí
22	Střela	102	3	922	Berounka	Liblín
23	Ploučnice	101	8	1,188	Elbe	Děčín
24	Oslava	101	3	867	Jihlava	Ivančice
25	Moravice	101	8	900	Opava	Opava

== Hierarchical list ==
This is a hierarchical list that includes all watercourses whose length within the territory of the Czech Republic is at least 20.0 kilometres (12.4 mi)

Explanatory notes

- The municipality in whose territory the confluence occurs is indicated in brackets.
- Rivers over 100 km (62 mi) long or having average discharge greater than 10 m^{3}/s (350 cu ft/s) are emphasized **in bold**.
- Watercourses not located themselves within the Czech Republic but possessing tributaries originating in the Czech Republic territory are shown ~~in strikethrough italics~~.

=== Rivers flowing to the North Sea (Elbe basin) ===
Scheme of principal tributaries and their contribution to average discharge of the Elbe (in m³/s)

- **Elbe** (leaves the country in Hřensko, empties into the North Sea)
  - Křinice (leaves the country in Krásná Lípa)
  - Kamenice (in Hřensko)
    - Chřibská Kamenice (in Srbská Kamenice)
  - **Ploučnice** (in Děčín)
    - Robečský potok (in Česká Lípa)
      - Bobří potok (in Jestřebí)
    - Šporka (in Česká Lípa)
    - Svitavka (in Zákupy)
    - Panenský potok (in Mimoň)
  - Jílovský potok (in Děčín)
  - Bílina (in Ústí nad Labem)
    - Srpina (in Obrnice)
  - Modla (in Lovosice)
  - **Ohře** (in Litoměřice)
    - Smolnický potok (in Vršovice)
    - Chomutovka (in Postoloprty)
    - Hasina (in Postoloprty)
    - Blšanka (in Zálužice)
    - Liboc (in Žatec)
      - Leska (in Nové Sedlo)
    - Prunéřovský potok (in Kadaň)
    - Bystřice (in Vojkovice)
    - Teplá (in Karlovy Vary)
      - Lomnický potok (in Březová)
    - Rolava (in Karlovy Vary)
    - Chodovský potok (in Karlovy Vary)
    - Svatava (in Sokolov)
    - Libava (in Kynšperk nad Ohří)
    - Libocký potok (in Kynšperk nad Ohří)
    - Odrava (in Odrava)
      - Lipoltovský potok (in Odrava)
    - Plesná (in Nebanice)
    - Slatinný potok (in Cheb)
  - Liběchovka (in Liběchov)
  - Pšovka (in Mělník)
  - **Vltava** (in Mělník; Vltava is the name given to the Teplá Vltava after its confluence with the Studená Vltava)
    - Bakovský potok (in Nová Ves)
      - Červený potok (in Velvary)
      - Vranský potok (in Chržín)
      - Zlonický potok (in Černuc)
    - Zákolanský potok (in Kralupy nad Vltavou)
      - Knovízský potok (in Kralupy nad Vltavou)
    - Litovický potok (in Prague-Dejvice)
    - Rokytka (in Prague-Libeň)
      - Říčanský potok (in Prague-Běchovice)
    - Botič (in Prague-Vyšehrad)
    - **Berounka** (in Prague-Lahovice; Berounka is the name given to the lower Mže following its confluence with the Radbuza)
      - Radotínský potok (in Prague-Radotín)
      - Loděnice (in Srbsko)
      - Litavka (in Beroun)
        - Červený potok (in Zdice)
      - Klíčava (in Zbečno)
      - Rakovnický potok (in Křivoklát)
      - Zbirožský potok (in Čilá)
      - Javornice (in Zvíkovec)
      - **Střela** (in Liblín)
        - Manětínský potok (in Štichovice)
        - Kralovický potok (in Kozojedy)
        - Velká Trasovka (in Žlutice)
      - Třemošná (in Kaceřov)
        - Bělá (in Třemošná)
      - Klabava (in Chrást)
        - Holoubkovský potok (in Rokycany)
      - Úslava (in Plzeň)
        - Bradava (in Nezvěstice)
      - **Radbuza** (in Plzeň)
        - **Úhlava** (in Plzeň)
          - Drnový potok (in Klatovy)
        - Merklínka (in Stod)
        - Zubřina (in Staňkov)
        - Černý potok (in Horšovský Týn)
      - **Mže** (in Plzeň; headwater of the Berounka)
        - Vejprnický potok (in Plzeň)
        - Úterský potok (in Erpužice)
        - Úhlavka (in Stříbro)
          - Výrovský potok (in Kladruby)
        - Kosový potok (in Planá)
        - Hamerský potok (in Kočov)
        - Sedlišťský potok (in Kočov)
    - **Sázava** (in Davle)
      - Janovický potok (in Týnec nad Sázavou)
      - Konopišťský potok (in Poříčí nad Sázavou)
      - Jevanský potok (in Stříbrná Skalice)
      - Blanice (in Soběšín)
        - Chotýšanka (in Libež)
      - **Želivka** (in Soutice; called Hejlovka on the upper course)
        - Sedlický potok (in Hulice)
        - Martinický potok (in Vojslavice)
        - Trnava (in Želiv)
          - Kejtovský potok (in Hořepník)
        - Jankovský potok (in Sedlice)
        - Bělá (in Krasíkovice)
      - Sázavka (in Světlá nad Sázavou)
        - Perlový potok (in Okrouhlice)
        - Úsobský potok (in Havlíčkův Brod)
      - Šlapanka (in Havlíčkův Brod)
        - Zlatý potok (in Věžnice)
    - Kocába (in Štěchovice)
      - Sychrovský potok (in Stará Huť)
    - Mastník (in Radíč)
      - Sedlecký potok (in Sedlčany)
    - Brzina (in Dublovice)
    - **Otava** (in Zvíkovské Podhradí; originates at the confluence of the Vydra and Křemelná)
      - Lomnice (in Oslov)
        - Skalice (in Varvažov)
        - Závišínský potok (in Blatná)
      - Blanice (in Putim)
        - Radomilický potok (in Protivín)
        - Zlatý potok (in Bavorov)
      - Brložský potok (in Kestřany)
      - Volyňka (in Strakonice)
        - Spůlka (in Bohumilice)
      - Novosedelský potok (in Katovice)
      - Březový potok (in Katovice)
      - Ostružná (in Sušice)
      - Křemelná (in Hartmanice)
      - Vydra (in Hartmanice; headwater of the Otava)
    - Hrejkovický potok (in Jetětice)
    - **Lužnice** (in Týn nad Vltavou)
      - Bilinský potok (in Týn nad Vltavou)
      - Židova strouha (in Bechyně)
      - Smutná (in Bechyně)
        - Milevský potok (in Sepekov)
      - Košínský potok (in Tábor)
      - Chotovinský potok (in Sezimovo Ústí)
        - Turovecký potok (in Tábor)
      - Černovický potok (in Soběslav)
      - Dírenský potok (in Soběslav)
      - Bechyňský potok (in Veselí nad Lužnicí)
      - **Nežárka** (in Veselí nad Lužnicí; originates at the confluence of the Kamenice and Žirovnice)
        - Řečice (in Kardašova Řečice)
        - Hamerský potok (in Jindřichův Hradec)
        - Kamenice (in Jarošov nad Nežárkou; headwater of the Nežárka)
        - Žirovnice (in Jarošov nad Nežárkou)
      - Miletínský potok (in Klec)
      - Koštěnický potok (in Majdalena)
      - Dračice (in Suchdol nad Lužnicí)
    - Bezdrevský potok (in Hluboká nad Vltavou)
    - Dehtářský potok (in Hluboká nad Vltavou)
    - Malše (in České Budějovice)
      - Stropnice (in Doudleby)
        - Svinenský potok (in Komařice)
      - Černá (in Kaplice)
        - Pohořský potok (in Malonty)
    - Křemžský potok (in Holubov)
    - Polečnice (in Český Krumlov)
    - Olšina (in Černá v Pošumaví)
    - Teplá Vltava (in Nová Pec; headwater of the Vltava and the whole Elbe–Vltava system)
      - Řasnice (in Stožec)
    - Studená Vltava (in Nová Pec)
  - Košátecký potok (in Neratovice)
  - **Jizera** (in Lázně Toušeň)
    - Strenický potok (in Písková Lhota)
    - Klenice (in Mladá Boleslav)
    - Zábrdka (in Klášter Hradiště nad Jizerou)
    - Mohelka (in Mohelnice nad Jizerou)
    - Žehrovka (in Březina)
    - Libuňka (in Turnov)
    - Oleška (in Semily)
    - Kamenice (in Semily)
    - Jizerka (in Víchová nad Jizerou)
  - Výmola (in Čelákovice)
  - Vlkava (in Kostomlaty nad Labem)
  - Výrovka (in Kostomlátky)
    - Šembera (in Zvěřínek)
    - Bečvárka (in Žabonosy)
  - Mrlina (in Nymburk)
    - Štítarský potok (in Křinec)
  - Cidlina (in Libice nad Cidlinou)
    - Bystřice (in Chlumec nad Cidlinou)
    - Javorka (in Skřivany)
  - Klejnárka (in Konárovice)
    - Vrchlice (in Nové Dvory)
  - Doubrava (in Záboří nad Labem)
    - Brslenka (in Horka I)
    - Hostačovka (in Žleby)
  - Podolský potok (in Pardubice)
  - Bylanka (in Pardubice)
  - **Chrudimka** (in Pardubice)
    - Novohradka (in Úhřetice)
      - Ležák (in Hrochův Týnec)
      - Žejbro (in Hrochův Týnec)
      - Krounka (in Luže)
  - Loučná (in Kunětice)
    - Končinský potok (in Cerekvice nad Loučnou)
    - Desná (in Tržek)
  - **Orlice** (in Hradec Králové; originates at the confluence of Divoká Orlice and Tichá Orlice)
    - Dědina (in Třebechovice pod Orebem)
    - **Tichá Orlice** (in Žďár nad Orlicí)
      - Třebovka (in Ústí nad Orlicí)
    - **Divoká Orlice** (in Žďár nad Orlicí; headwater of the Orlice)
      - Bělá (in Častolovice)
        - Kněžná (in Synkov-Slemeno)
      - Zdobnice (in Doudleby nad Orlicí)
  - Trotina (in Lochenice)
  - Metuje (in Jaroměř)
    - Olešenka (in Jestřebí)
    - Dřevíč (in Hronov)
  - Úpa (in Jaroměř)
  - Běluňka (in Heřmanice)
  - Malé Labe (in Prosečné)

=== Rivers flowing to the Baltic Sea (Oder basin) ===
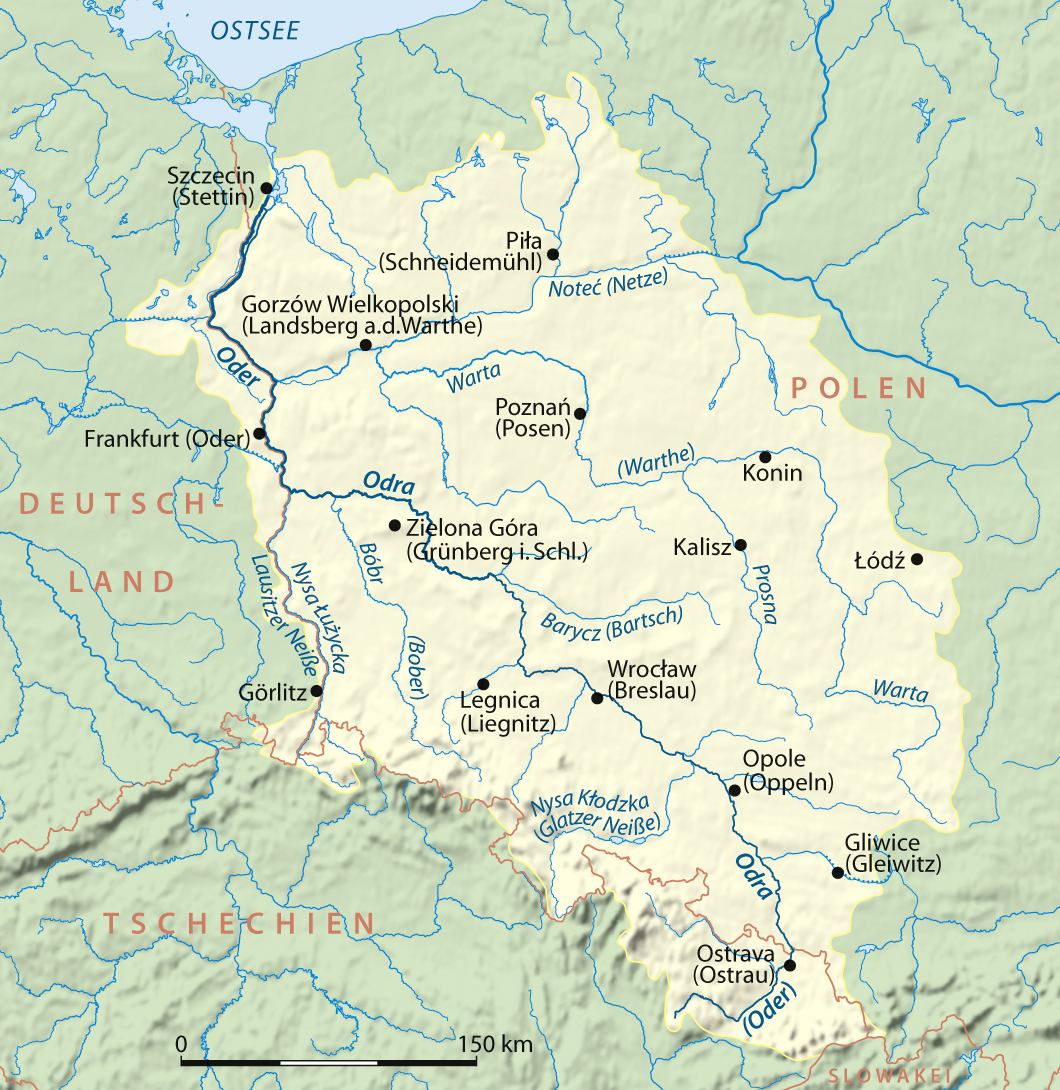
Drainage basin of the Oder, which includes the northeast and some northern portions of Czech territory

tributaries joining the Oder during its course through Poland (mainly from the Western Sudetes and Central Sudetes regions)

- **Oder** (leaves the country in Bohumín, empties into the Baltic Sea)
  - **Lusatian Neisse** (leaves the country in Hrádek nad Nisou)
    - Smědá (leaves the country in Černousy)
    - Jeřice (in Chrastava)
  - **~~Eastern Neisse~~**
    - Bělá (leaves the country in Mikulovice)
    - Vidnávka (leaves the country in Velká Kraš)
    - Stěnava (leaves the country in Otovice)
  - Osoblaha (leaves the country in Osoblaha)

tributaries joining the Oder within the Czech Republic

  - **Olza** (in Bohumín)
    - Stonávka (in Karviná)
  - **Ostravice** (in Ostrava; originates at the confluence of the Bílá Ostravice and Černá Ostravice)
    - Lučina (in Ostrava)
    - Olešná (in Paskov)
    - Morávka (in Frýdek-Místek)
  - **Opava** (in Ostrava; originates at the confluence of the Černá Opava and Střední Opava)
    - **Moravice** (in Opava)
      - Hvozdnice (in Opava)
      - Černý potok (in Mezina)
      - Podolský potok (in Velká Štáhle)
    - Čižina (in Brumovice
    - Opavice (in Krnov)
  - Ondřejnice (in Ostrava)
  - Lubina (in Jistebník)
  - Bílovka (in Studénka)
  - Sedlnice (in Studénka)
  - Husí potok (in Hladké Životice)
  - Jičínka (in Hladké Životice)
  - Luha (in Jeseník nad Odrou)

=== Rivers flowing to the Black Sea (Danube basin) ===
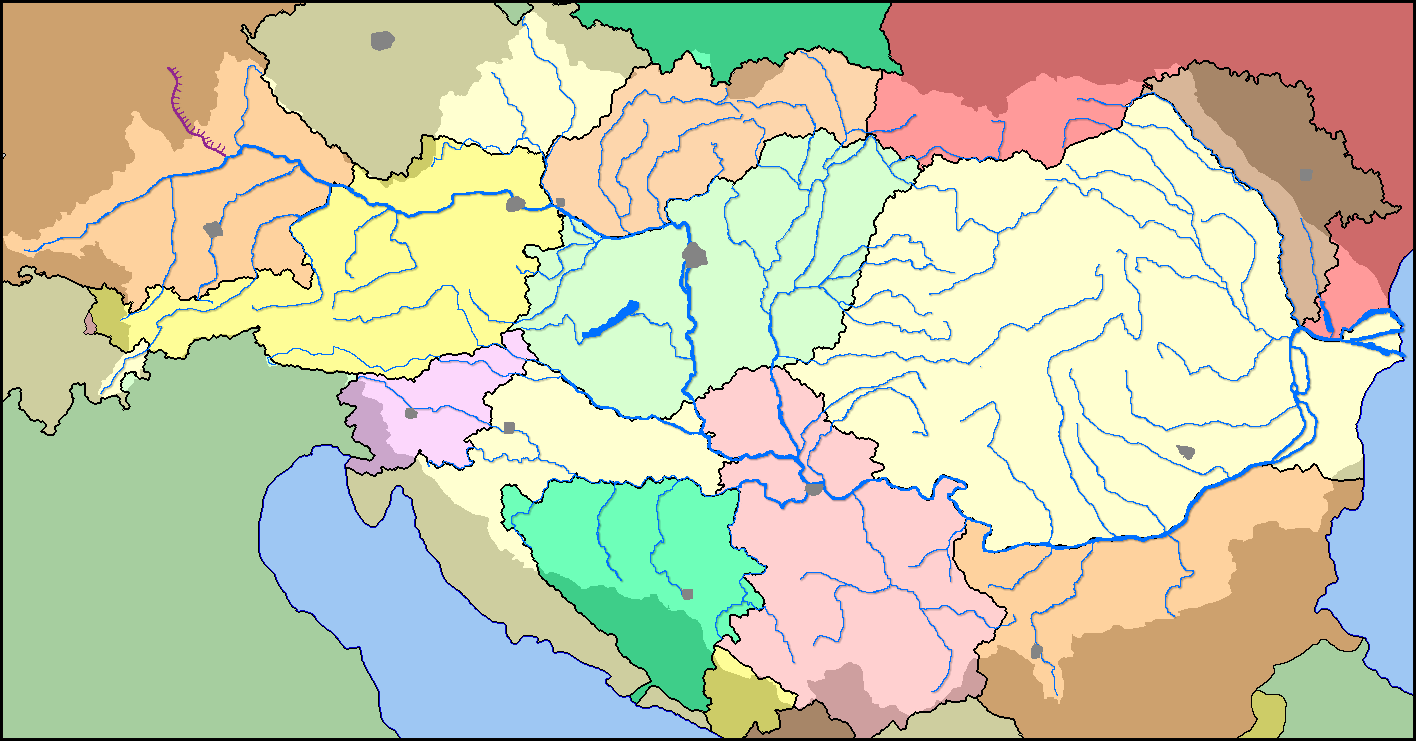
Drainage basin of the Danube with Morava, Svratka and Thaya shown in the southeast of the country

- **~~Danube~~** (empties into the Black Sea)
  - **~~Váh~~**
    - Vlára (leaves the country in Brumov-Bylnice)
  - **Morava** (leaves the country in Lanžhot)
    - **Thaya** (in Lanžhot; originates at the confluence of the Moravian Thaya and ~~German Thaya~~)
      - Kyjovka (in Lanžhot)
        - Kopanice (in Lanžhot)
        - Prušánka (in Hodonín)
        - Hruškovice (in Svatobořice-Mistřín)
      - Trkmanka (in Podivín)
      - **Svratka** (in Dolní Věstonice)
        - **Jihlava** (in Ivaň)
          - Rokytná (in Ivančice)
            - Olešná (in Tulešice)
            - Rouchovanka (in Rešice)
            - Rokytka (in Jaroměřice nad Rokytnou)
          - Oslava (in Ivančice)
            - Chvojnice (in Kuroslepy)
            - Balinka (in Velké Meziříčí)
          - Brtnice (in Brtnice)
          - Jihlávka (in Jihlava)
          - Třešťský potok (in Cejle)
        - Šatava (in Uherčice)
        - Litava (in Židlochovice)
          - Říčka (in Měnín)
          - Rakovec (in Hrušky)
        - Bobrava (in Popovice)
        - Svitava (in Brno)
          - Punkva (in Blansko)
          - Bělá (in Lhota Rapotina)
          - Křetínka (in Letovice)
        - Bílý potok (in Veverská Bítýška)
        - Bobrůvka (in Předklášteří; alternatively called Loučka on the lower course)
          - Libochovka (in Dolní Loučky)
        - Lubě (in Březina)
        - Nedvědička (in Nedvědice)
        - Hodonínka (in Štěpánov nad Svratkou)
        - Bystřice (in Vír)
        - Fryšávka (in Jimramov)
      - Želetavka (in Bítov)
      - Daníž (in Jaroslavice)
      - Jevišovka (in Jevišovka)
        - Skalička (in Práče)
      - Moravian Thaya (leaves the country in Písečné)
        - Bolíkovský potok (in Staré Hobzí)
        - Vápovka (in Dačice)
    - Velička (in Vracov)
    - Okluky (in Uherský Ostroh)
    - Olšava (in Kunovice)
      - Nivnička (in Uherský Brod)
      - Luhačovický potok (in Uherský Brod)
    - Březnice (in Kněžpole)
    - Dřevnice (in Otrokovice)
    - Rusava (in Hulín)
    - Kotojedka (in Kroměříž)
    - Moštěnka (in Kroměříž)
    - Haná (in Kroměříž; originates at the confluence of the Velká Haná and Malá Haná)
      - Brodečka (in Němčice nad Hanou)
      - Velká Haná (in Vyškov)
    - Romže (in Uhřičice; also known as Valová following its confluence with the Hloučela)
      - Hloučela (in Prostějov)
    - Blata (in Lobodice)
      - Šumice (in Těšetice)
    - **Bečva** (in Tovačov; originates at the confluence of the Vsetínská Bečva and Rožnovská Bečva)
      - Juhyně (in Choryně)
      - Vsetínská Bečva (in Valašské Meziříčí)
        - Bystřička (in Bystřička)
        - Senice (in Ústí)
      - Rožnovská Bečva (in Valašské Meziříčí)
    - Bystřice (in Olomouc)
    - Trusovický potok (in Olomouc)
    - Oskava (in Olomouc)
      - Sitka (in Olomouc)
      - Teplička (in Žerotín)
      - Oslava (in Uničov)
    - Třebůvka (in Moravičany)
      - Jevíčka (in Městečko Trnávka)
    - Mírovka (in Mohelnice)
    - Moravská Sázava (in Zvole)
      - Březná (in Hoštejn)
    - Desná (in Postřelmov)
    - Branná (in Hanušovice)

== Alphabetical list ==
This is an alphabetical list that includes all rivers whose total length is at least 50 kilometres and have at least a small part in the Czech Republic. The Czech name is given in brackets in italics for rivers, the greater part of which is outside the territory of the country.

- Bečva
- Bělá (Eastern Neisse)
- Berounka
- Bílina
- Blanice (Otava)
- Blanice (Sázava)
- Blšanka
- Bóbr (Bobr)
- Bobrůvka
- Bystřice (Cidlina)
- Bystřice (Morava)
- Chamb (Kouba)
- Chomutovka
- Chrudimka
- Cidlina
- Dědina
- Divoká Orlice
- Doubrava
- Dračice
- Dyje (Thaya)
- Elbe (Labe)
- Flöha (Flájský potok)
- Freiberger Mulde (Freiberská Mulda)
- Haná
- Jevišovka
- Jihlava
- Jizera
- Klabava
- Kyjovka
- Litava
- Litavka
- Loděnice
- Lomnice
- Loučná
- Lusatian Neisse (Lužická Nisa)
- Lužnice
- Malše
- Metuje
- Morava
- Moravice
- Moravská Dyje (Moravian Thaya)
- Moravská Sázava
- Myjava (Myjava)
- Mže
- Nežárka
- Oder (Odra)
- Ohře
- Olše (Olza)
- Opava
- Orlice
- Oskava
- Oslava
- Osobłoga (Osoblaha)
- Ostravice
- Otava
- Pfreimd (Kateřinský potok)
- Ploučnice
- Radbuza
- Rokytná
- Sázava
- Schwarzach (Nemanický potok)
- Ścinawka (Stěnava)
- Skalice
- Smědá
- Spree (Spréva)
- Střela
- Stropnice
- Svitava
- Svratka
- Teplá
- Teplá Vltava
- Tichá Orlice
- Trnava
- Úhlava
- Úpa
- Úslava
- Vltava
- Vsetínská Bečva
- Výrovka
- Waldnaab (Lesní Nába)
- White Elster (Bílý Halštrov)
- Wild Weißeritz (Divoká Bystřice)
- Wondreb (Odrava)
- Želetavka
- Želivka

== Drainage basins ==
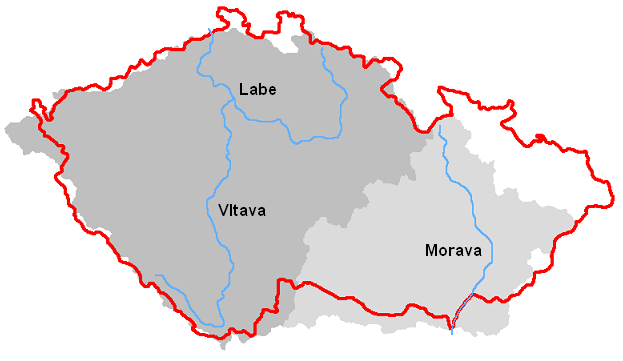
Catchment areas of the Elbe–Vltava system (dark grey) and the Morava–Thaya (light grey) before they leave the Czech Republic. The remaining white areas in the northeast and north belong to the Oder and its tributaries while narrow white strip along southwestern border denotes some smaller direct tributaries of the Danube.

As the main European watershed passes through the Czech Republic, there are three directions and principal areas of drainage (very roughly overlapping with historical territories of Bohemia, Moravia and Silesia):

Almost 2/3 of the country is drained in NW direction through the Elbe into the North Sea. The Morava flowing towards SE collects water from eastern regions of the Czech Republic and discharges into Danube which flows to the Black Sea. The northeast and some northern portions of the territory is drained by the Oder and its tributaries like the Lusatian Neisse into the Baltic Sea. The corresponding watershed tripoint with a marker for symbolic "roof of Europe" (50°9'27"N 16°47'27"E) is located at Czech–Polish border on the mountain Klepáč near Dolní Morava in Králický Sněžník Mountains.

The catchment area of the Elbe down to Czech–German border in Hřensko/Schöna covers 51,394 square kilometres (19,843 sq mi). This figure includes upper courses of some tributaries starting in neighbouring countries. The area solely within Czech borders is slightly smaller and this is the figure given in the following table, which shows Czech territory divided after drainage basins.

River	level 1	level 2	level 3
Elbe	49,933 (Note: 144,055 km² including part of basin extending to Germany, Austria and Poland)		
Vltava		27,006.7 (Note: 28,090 km² including part of basin extending to Germany and Austria)	
Ohře		4,601.1 (Note: 5,614 km² including part of basin extending to Germany)	
Danube	21,736 (Note: the remaining area of the Czech Republic after subtracting of Elbe and Oder drainage basins)		
Morava		20,692.4 (Note: 26,658 km² including part of basin extending to Austria and Slovakia)	
Thaya			11,164.7 (Note: 13,419 km² including part of basin extending to Austria)
Oder	7,217		
total (km^{2})	78,886		
