= Střela =

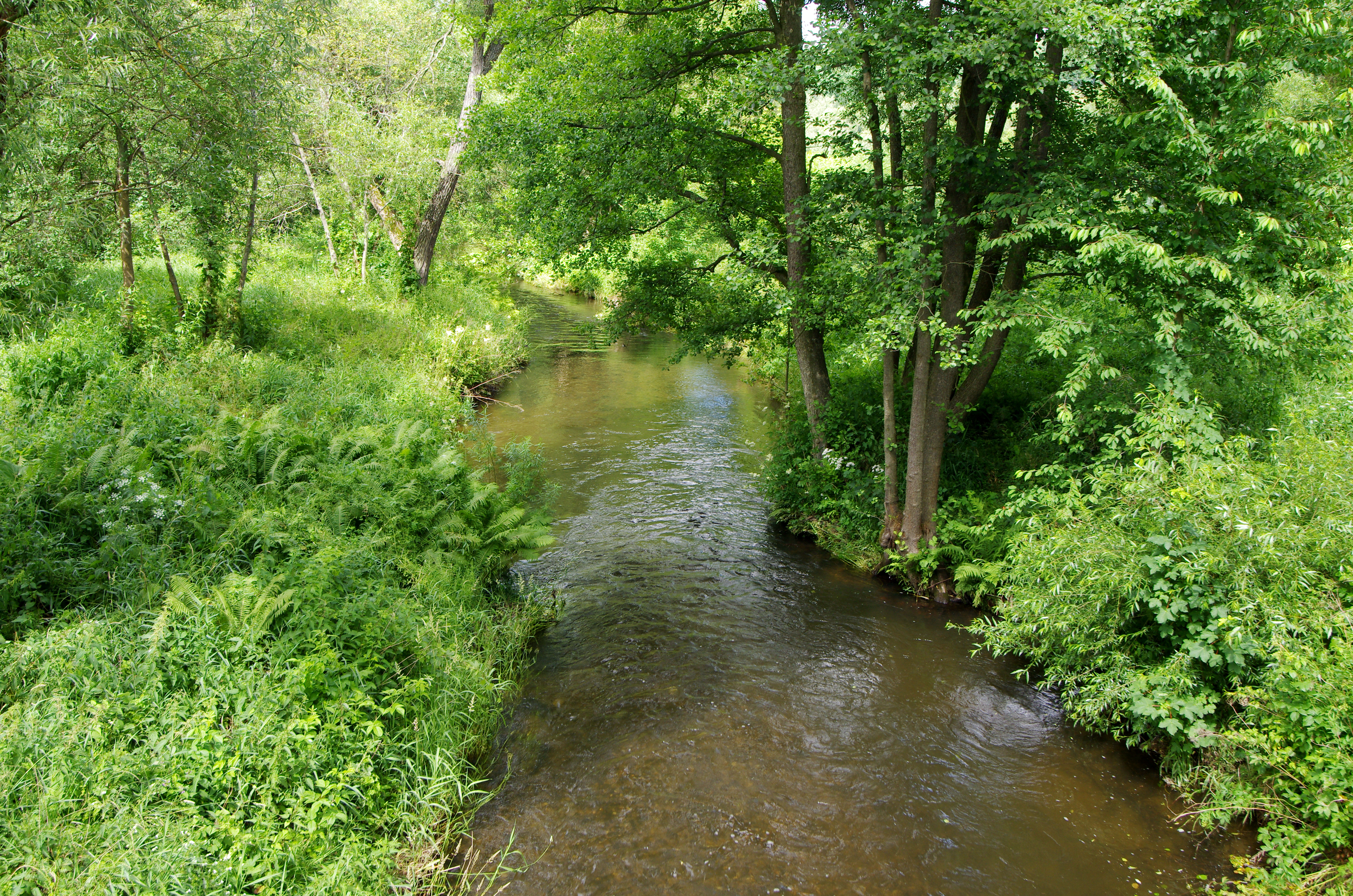
- The Střela in Žlutice

Location
- Country: Czech Republic
- Regions: Karlovy Vary; Central Bohemian

Physical characteristics
- Source
  - location: Toužim, Teplá Highlands
  - coordinates: 50°0′47″N 12°56′56″E
  - elevation: 674 m (2,211 ft)
- Mouth
  - location: Berounka
  - coordinates: 49°54′52″N 13°31′47″E
  - elevation: 269 m (883 ft)
- Length: 101.6 km (63.1 mi)
- Basin size: 921.9 km^{2} (355.9 sq mi)
- Discharge
  - average: 3.20 m^{3}/s (113 cu ft/s) near estuary

Basin features
- Progression: Berounka→ Vltava→ Elbe→ North Sea

The Střela (Czech pronunciation: [ˈstr̝̊ɛla]) is a river in the Czech Republic, a left tributary of the Berounka River. It flows through the Karlovy Vary and Central Bohemian regions. It is 101.6 km (63.1 mi) long, making it the 22nd longest river in the Czech Republic.

== Etymology ==
The name means 'missile' in Czech and refers to its fast stream. The river was also once called Lososnice (derived from losos, i.e. 'salmon').

== Characteristic ==
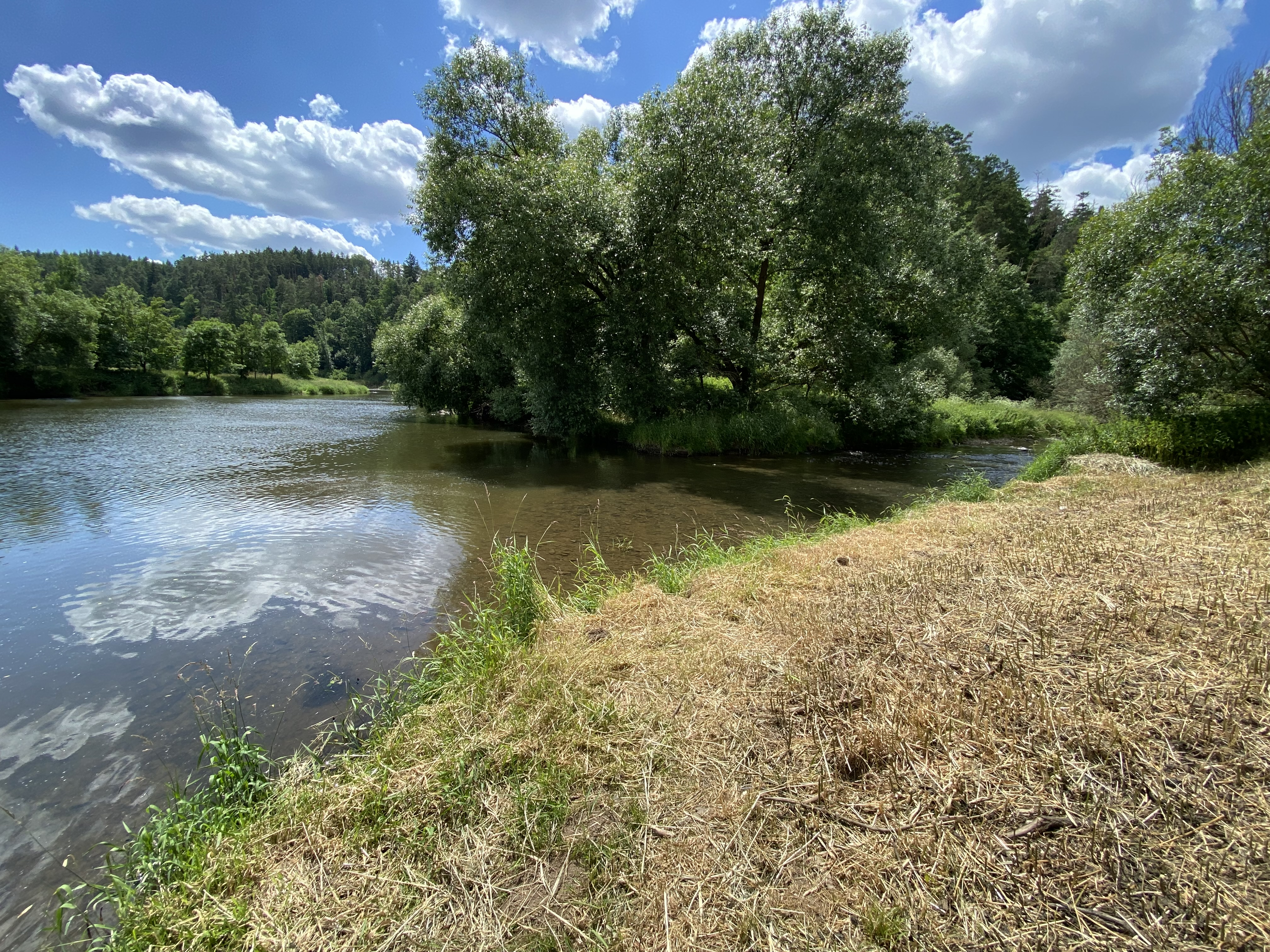
Confluence with the Berounka

The Střela originates in the territory of Toužim in the Teplá Highlands at an elevation of 674 m (2,211 ft) and flows to Liblín, where it enters the Berounka River at an elevation of 269 m (883 ft). It is 101.6 km (63.1 mi) long, making it the 22nd longest river in the Czech Republic. Its drainage basin has an area of 921.9 km^{2} (355.9 sq mi).

The tributaries of the Střela do not include any significant rivers, only smaller streams. The longest tributaries of the Střela are:

Tributary	Length (km)	River km	Side
Manětínský potok	22.5	29.6	right
Kralovický potok	21.8	1.2	left
Velká Trasovka	20.7	59.4	left
Ratibořský potok	17.0	69.7	left
Mladotický potok	16.2	23.5	left
Borecký potok	14.2	66.8	right
Bochovský potok	13.3	77.4	left
Luhovský potok	11.3	74.8	right
Jesínecký potok	9.0	73.0	left

== Course ==
There are no significant settlements on the Střela. The most populated settlement is the town of Toužim, where the river originates. The river further flows through the municipal territories of Útvina, Bochov, Štědrá, Žlutice, Chyše, Manětín, Štichovice, Mladotice, Pláně, Plasy, Obora, Koryta, Dolní Hradiště, Kozojedy and Liblín.

== Bodies of water ==
There are 96 bodies of water larger than 1 ha in the basin area. The largest body of water is the Žlutice Reservoir with an area of 142 ha (350 acres), built directly on the Střela. On the upper course of the river is a system of fishponds.

== Fauna ==
Species of animals that are endangered within the Czech Republic and live in or near the river include the brook lamprey, European crayfish and Eurasian beaver.

== Tourism ==
The Střela is suitable for river tourism only after heavy rains, melting snow or when water is released from the Žlutice Reservoir.
