= Hulice =

- Municipality
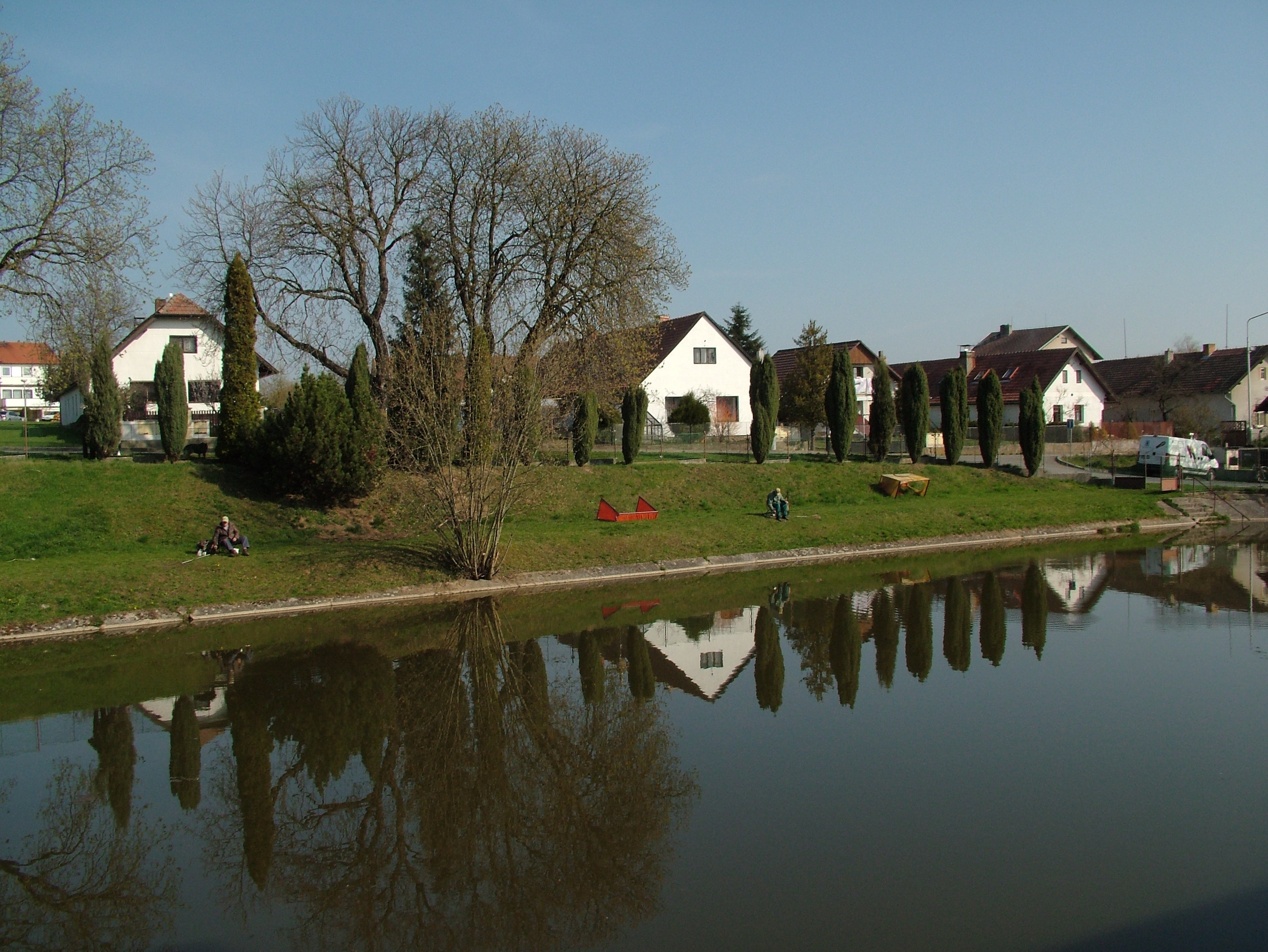
- Centre of Hulice

- Flag Coat of arms

- Location in the Czech Republic
- Coordinates: 49°42′35″N 15°5′15″E
- Country: Czech Republic
- Region: Central Bohemian
- District: Benešov
- First mentioned: 1295

Area
  - Total: 6.48 km^{2} (2.50 sq mi)
- Elevation: 403 m (1,322 ft)

Population (2026-01-01)
  - Total: 271
  - Density: 41.8/km^{2} (108/sq mi)
- Time zone: UTC+1 (CET)
  - Summer (DST): UTC+2 (CEST)
- Postal code: 257 63
- Website: hulice.cz

Hulice is a municipality and village in Benešov District in the Central Bohemian Region of the Czech Republic. It has about 300 inhabitants.

== Administrative division ==
Hulice consists of two municipal parts (in brackets population according to the 2021 census):

- Hulice (249)
- Rýzmburk (24)

== Etymology ==
The name is derived from the personal name Hula.

== Geography ==
Hulice is located about 30 kilometres (19 mi) east of Benešov and 55 km (34 mi) southeast of Prague. It lies in the Vlašim Uplands. The highest point is at 434 m (1,424 ft) above sea level. The municipality is situated on the shores of the Švihov Reservoir, built on the Želivka River.

== History ==
The first written mention of Hulice is from 1295. Until the Hussite Wars, the village belonged to the Štěpánov estate, owned by Prague archbishopric. After the wars, Hulice was acquired for a while by the Trčka of Lípa family. After that, the owners often changed and among them were various less important nobles. In the 17th century, Hulice became a part of the Křivsoudov estate. In the 18th century, the village was annexed to the Soutice estate.

== Demographics ==
Historical population

Year	Pop.	±%
1869	392	—
1880	445	+13.5%
1890	462	+3.8%
1900	495	+7.1%
1910	517	+4.4%

Year	Pop.	±%
1921	479	−7.4%
1930	399	−16.7%
1950	309	−22.6%
1961	293	−5.2%
1970	261	−10.9%

Year	Pop.	±%
1980	321	+23.0%
1991	340	+5.9%
2001	299	−12.1%
2011	285	−4.7%
2021	273	−4.2%

Source: Censuses

== Transport ==
The D1 motorway from Prague to Brno runs through the municipality.

== Sights ==
There are no protected cultural monuments in the municipality.

In Hulice is the Vodní dům ('water house'), a visitor centre of the Švihov Reservoir with an exposition on water treatment and with game elements for both children and adults. The visitor centre organises guided tours of the dam.
