= Josef Antonín Sehling =

Bohemian composer and violinist

Josef Antonín Sehling (also Seeling, Seling, Sölling; 7 January 1710 – 19 September 1756) was a Bohemian composer and violinist of the baroque period.

== Life ==
Sehling was born in Toužim (German: Teusing), Western Bohemia. From an early age, he received music lessons from the local cantor, and later completed his education in Prague and Vienna. From 1737, he was second violinist in the Orchestra of St. Vitus Cathedral, and around the same time, he worked as a court musician and composer for Count Morzin at his palace in Prague. In 1740, he became choir director at the Church of Our Lady beneath the Chain in the Malá Strana district of Prague, and at the same time filled in as the choir director at St. Vitus and the Barnabite St. Benedictus.

Sehling was a very prolific composer of sacred music, namely arias, masses, requiems, motets and offertoria. Manuscript copies of his works are scattered throughout libraries, among others, in Nymburk, Roudnice nad Labem, Broumov, St. Vitus Cathedral, and in the monastery of the elizabethans. He was possibly associated with Christoph Willibald Gluck.

Among his pupils were the sopranist Johann Christian Preissler from Polevsko and the Premonstratensian Johann Oelschlegel (1724–1788), choir rector in Strahov Monastery, organ builder and composer.

== Compositions (selection) ==
- Oratorium Filius prodigus, 1739
- Judith, a coronation opera in celebration of the coronation Maria Theresia as queen of Bohemia, 1743
- Constantinus, 1751
- Missa Bella premunt hostilia
- Missa De robur for auxilium
