= Toužim =

- Town
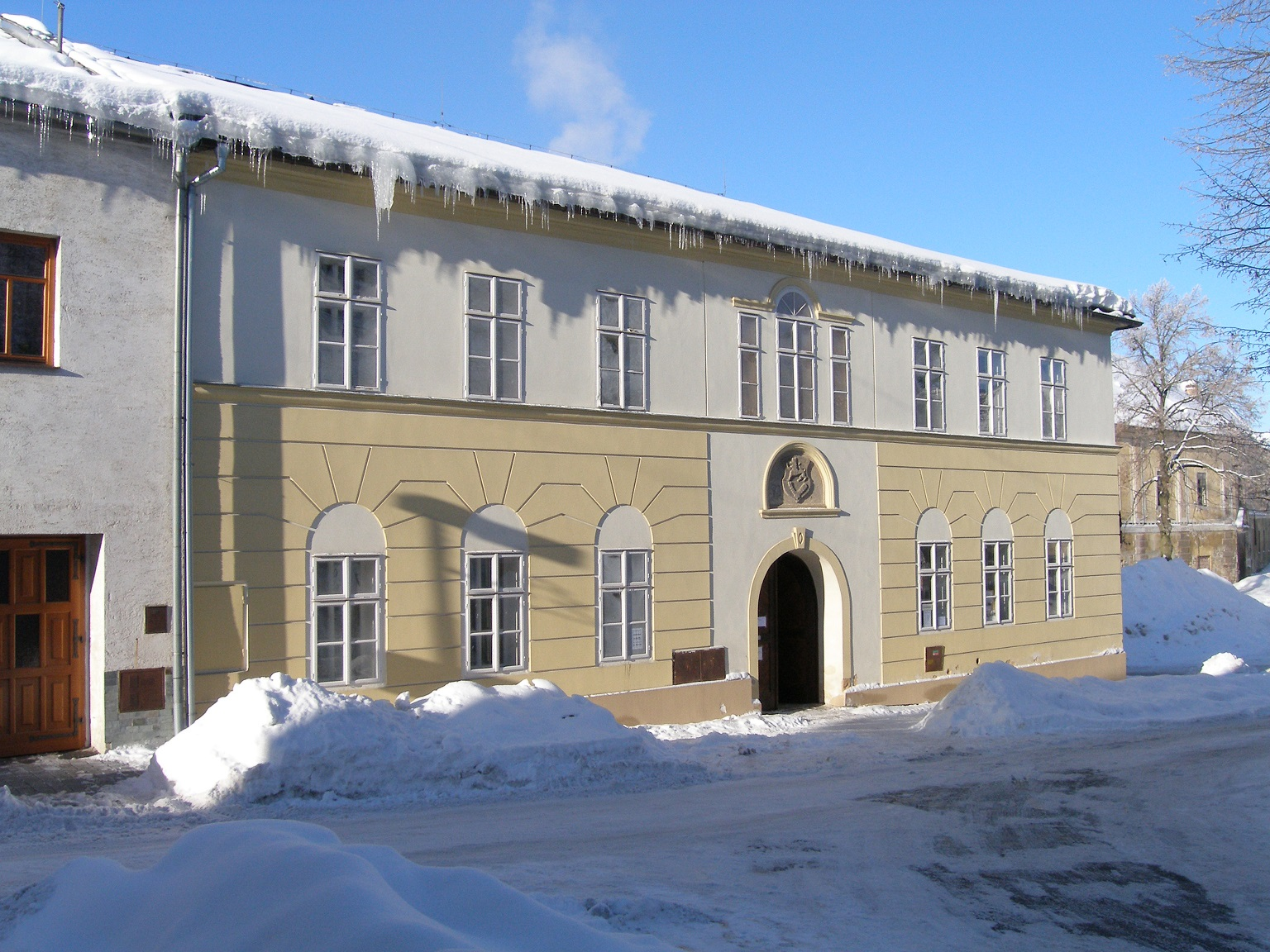
- Former town hall at the town square

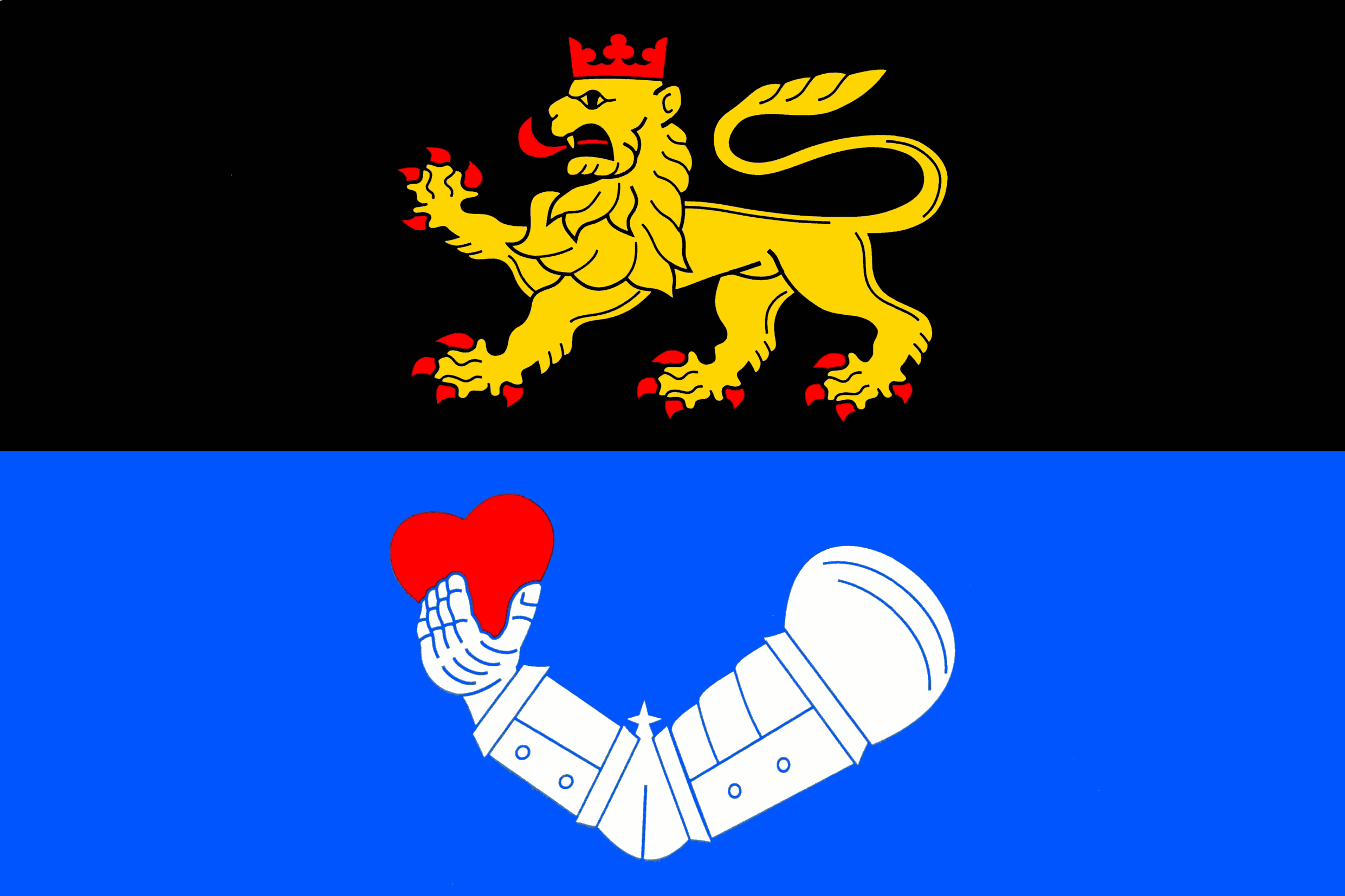
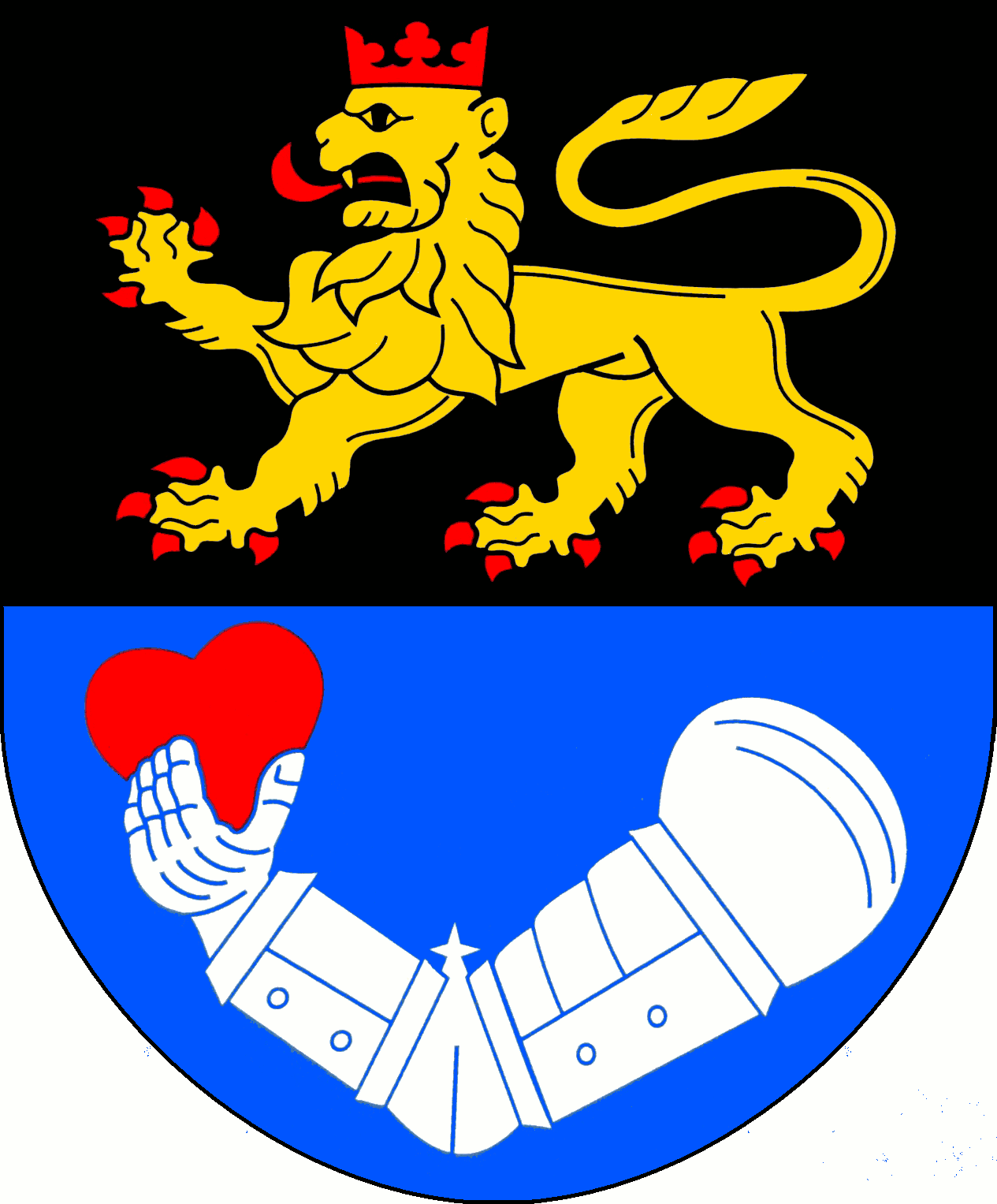
- Flag Coat of arms

- Location in the Czech Republic
- Coordinates: 50°3′38″N 12°59′6″E
- Country: Czech Republic
- Region: Karlovy Vary
- District: Karlovy Vary
- First mentioned: 1354

Government
  - Mayor: Alexandr Žák

Area
  - Total: 98.55 km^{2} (38.05 sq mi)
- Elevation: 612 m (2,008 ft)

Population (2026-01-01)
  - Total: 3,458
  - Density: 35.09/km^{2} (90.88/sq mi)
- Time zone: UTC+1 (CET)
  - Summer (DST): UTC+2 (CEST)
- Postal code: 364 20
- Website: www.touzim.cz

Toužim (Czech pronunciation: [ˈtouʒɪm]; German: Theusing) is a town in Karlovy Vary District in the Karlovy Vary Region of the Czech Republic. It has about 3,500 inhabitants. The historic town centre is well preserved and is protected by law as urban monument zone.

== Administrative division ==
Toužim consists of 16 municipal parts (in brackets population according to the 2021 census):

- Toužim (2,699)
- Bezděkov (45)
- Branišov (10)
- Dobrá Voda (110)
- Dřevohryzy (0)
- Kojšovice (69)
- Komárov (74)
- Kosmová (166)
- Lachovice (0)
- Luhov (8)
- Nežichov (33)
- Políkno (27)
- Prachomety (55)
- Radyně (57)
- Smilov (12)
- Třebouň (92)

== Geography ==
Toužim is located about 21 kilometres (13 mi) south of Karlovy Vary. It lies in the Teplá Highlands. The highest point is the hill Třebouňský vrch at 825 m (2,707 ft) above sea level. The Střela River originates in the municipal territory and flows through the town proper.

== History ==
The first written mention of Toužim is in a document from 1354, where there was written about the site of a Premonstratensian provostry. The surrounding fortified town was founded in 1469.

== Demographics ==
Historical population

Year	Pop.	±%
1869	5,075	—
1880	5,109	+0.7%
1890	5,155	+0.9%
1900	5,052	−2.0%
1910	5,104	+1.0%

Year	Pop.	±%
1921	5,085	−0.4%
1930	4,898	−3.7%
1950	2,462	−49.7%
1961	2,680	+8.9%
1970	3,594	+34.1%

Year	Pop.	±%
1980	3,949	+9.9%
1991	3,864	−2.2%
2001	3,798	−1.7%
2011	3,710	−2.3%
2021	3,457	−6.8%

Source: Censuses

== Transport ==
Toužim is located on the railway line of local importance heading from Rakovník to Bečov nad Teplou.

== Sights ==
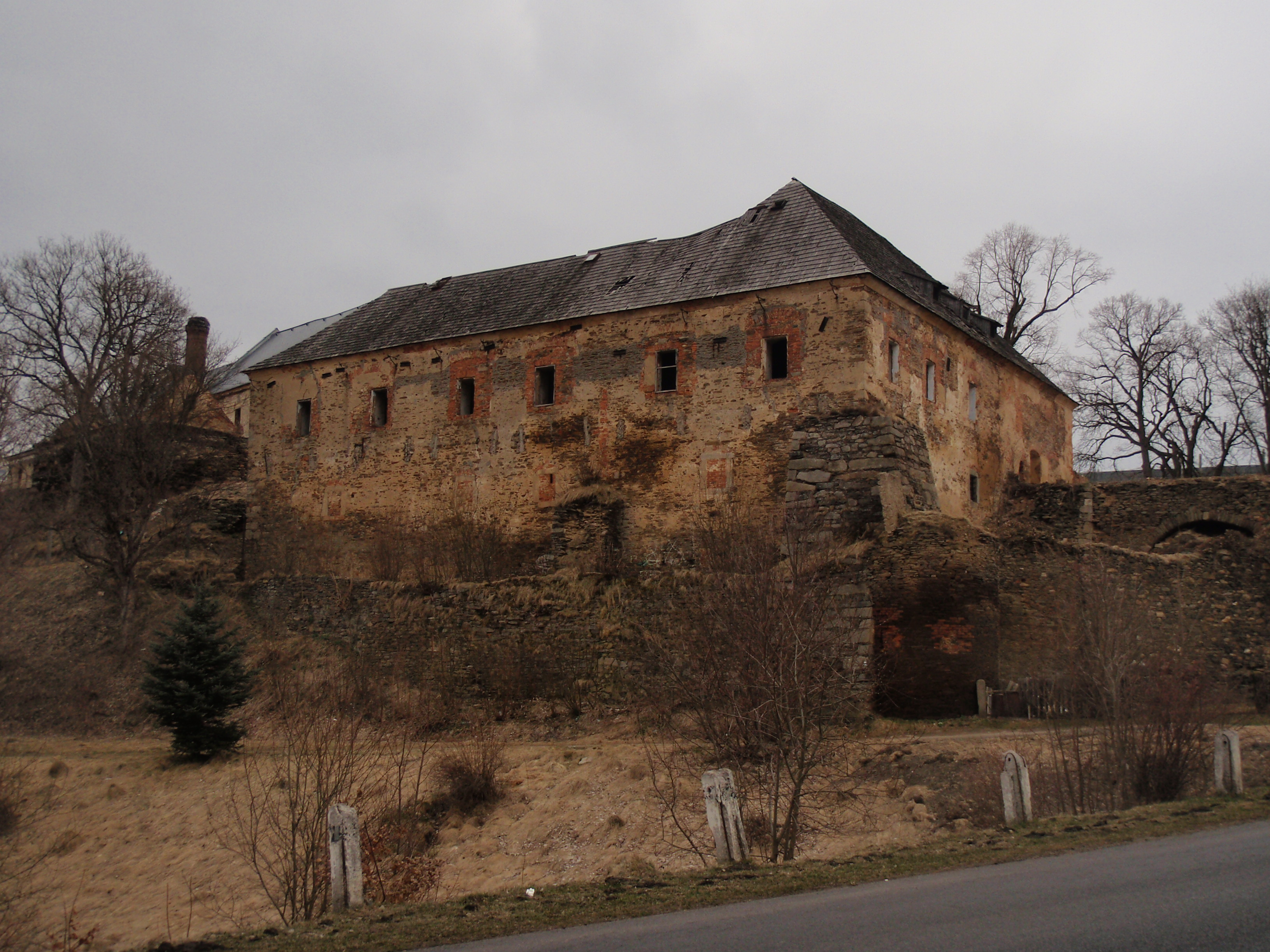
Toužim Castle

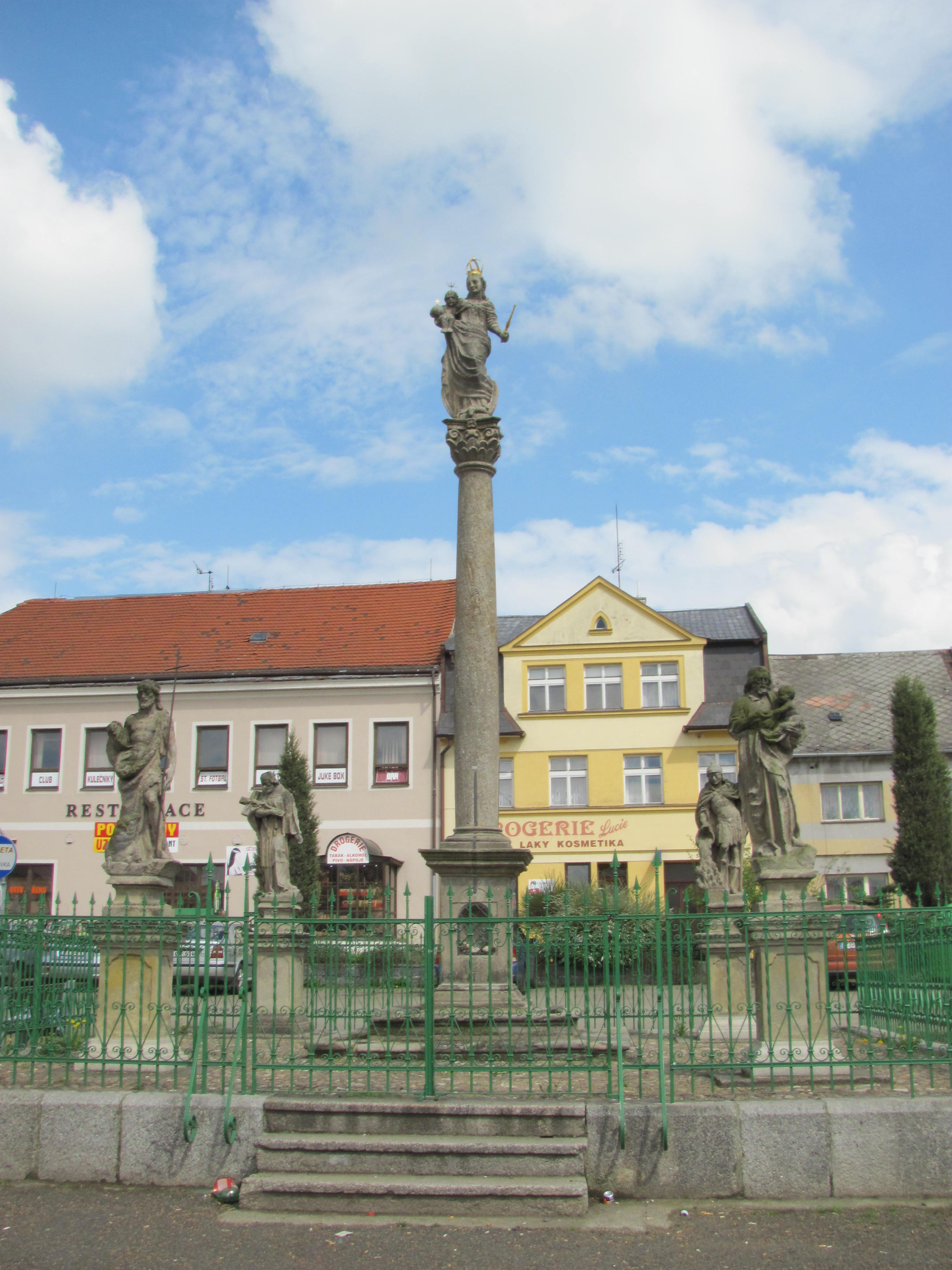
Marian column on the square

The main landmark of the historic centre is the castle complex, formed by two castle buildings, a manorial brewery and fragments of town walls.

The Church of the Nativity of the Virgin Mary was roginally built in the late Gothic style after 1488. However, this parish deanery church was damaged by fires and had to be ebuilt in 1738–1742. The northern Gothic tower and the Baroque side chapel of Christ the Sufferer from 1699 have been preserved.

The former town hall on the town square is an Empire building with a Gothic core. It was rebuilt to its present form after numerous fires. In the middle of the town square is a Marian column from 1705, a fountain from the mid-18th century, and a modern sculpture of King George of Poděbrady, after whom the square is named.

== Notable people ==
- Francis Erdmann, Duke of Saxe-Lauenburg (1629–1666), German nobleman
- Josef Antonín Sehling (1710–1756), composer
- Ignaz Friedrich Tausch (1793–1848), botanist
- Emil Triner (born 1961), racing driver
