= Křivsoudov =

- Market town
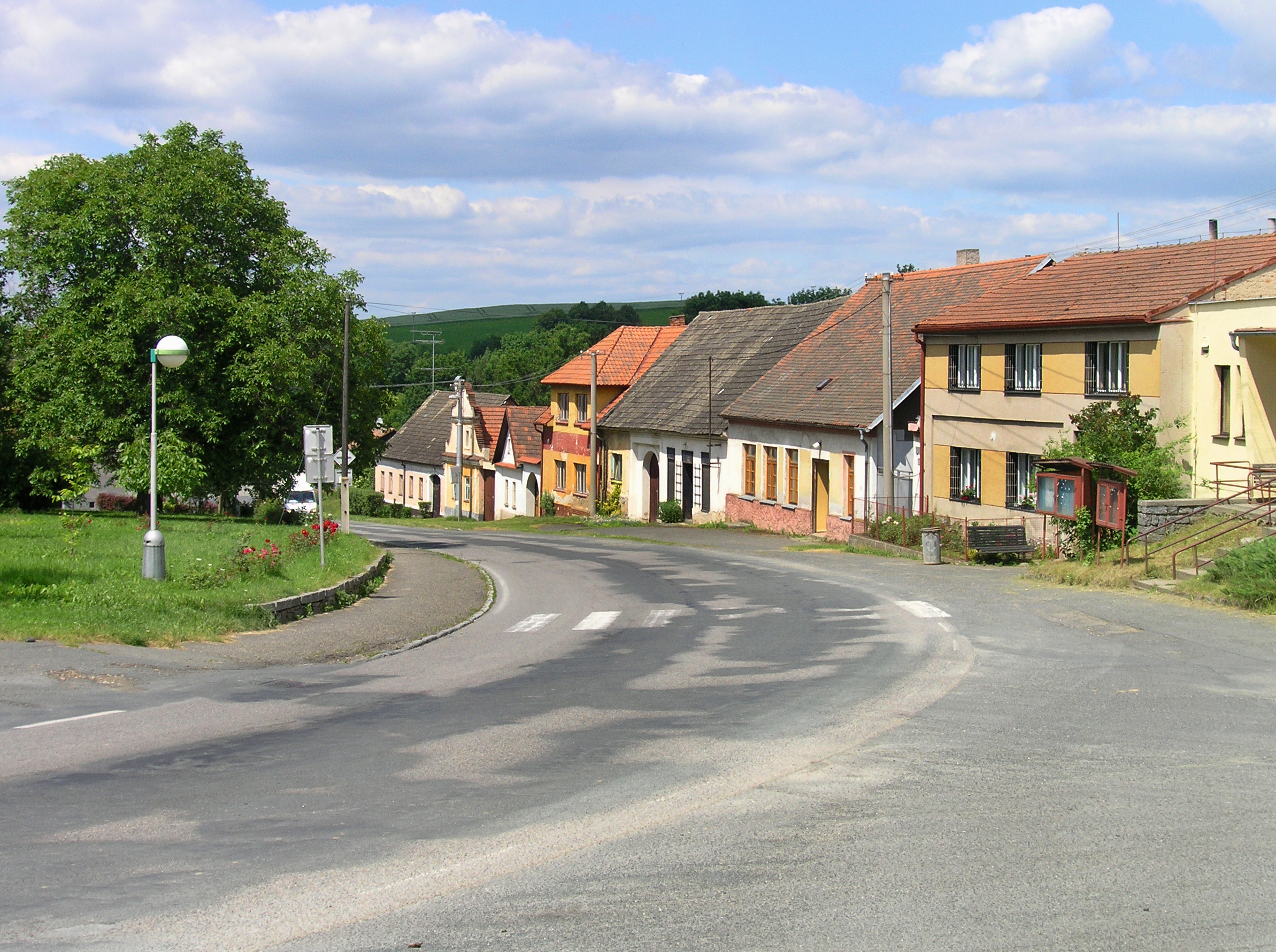
- Centre of Křivsoudov

- Flag Coat of arms

- Location in the Czech Republic
- Coordinates: 49°37′59″N 15°5′15″E
- Country: Czech Republic
- Region: Central Bohemian
- District: Benešov
- First mentioned: 1276

Area
  - Total: 13.66 km^{2} (5.27 sq mi)
- Elevation: 442 m (1,450 ft)

Population (2026-01-01)
  - Total: 490
  - Density: 36/km^{2} (93/sq mi)
- Time zone: UTC+1 (CET)
  - Summer (DST): UTC+2 (CEST)
- Postal codes: 257 65, 257 66
- Website: www.mestys-krivsoudov.cz

Křivsoudov (Czech pronunciation: [ˈkr̝̊ɪfsoudof]) is a market town in Benešov District in the Central Bohemian Region of the Czech Republic. It has about 500 inhabitants.

== Administrative division ==
Křivsoudov consists of three municipal parts (in brackets population according to the 2021 census):

- Křivsoudov (396)
- Jenišovice (0)
- Lhota Bubeneč (38)

== Etymology ==
The name is derived from the personal name Křivosúd, meaning "Křivosúd's (fortress)".

== Geography ==
Křivsoudov is located about 33 kilometres (21 mi) southeast of Benešov and 62 km (39 mi) southeast of Prague. It lies in the Křemešník Highlands. The highest point is at 542 m (1,778 ft) above sea level.

== History ==
The first written mention of Křivsoudov is from 1276, when there was a fortress owned by Oldřich of Říčany. He replaced it with a castle and founded also the Church of the Nativity of the Virgin Mary. From 1307 to 1424, the village was property of the bishopric of Prague. In the second half of the 14th century, during the rule of Jan of Jenštejn, Křivsoudov was promoted to a market town. The Trčka of Lípa family then owned Křivsoudov for more than 100 years, but they did not live here and the local castle fell into disrepair.

Jindřich Střela of Rokyce bought Křivsoudov in 1550 and had repair the castle. During the rule of the Střela of Rokyce family, the market town obtained various privileges and prospered. The properties of the family were confiscated in 1622 after the Battle of White Mountain. The next notable owner of the estate was John Leopold of Trautson and Falkenstein, who bought it in 1702 and merged it with the Dolní Kralovice estate. In 1715, the castle and the market town were damaged by a fire and John Leopold left Křivsoudov.

== Demographics ==
Historical population

Year	Pop.	±%
1869	985	—
1880	1,021	+3.7%
1890	896	−12.2%
1900	901	+0.6%
1910	894	−0.8%

Year	Pop.	±%
1921	879	−1.7%
1930	729	−17.1%
1950	647	−11.2%
1961	619	−4.3%
1970	549	−11.3%

Year	Pop.	±%
1980	508	−7.5%
1991	424	−16.5%
2001	390	−8.0%
2011	407	+4.4%
2021	434	+6.6%

Source: Censuses

== Transport ==
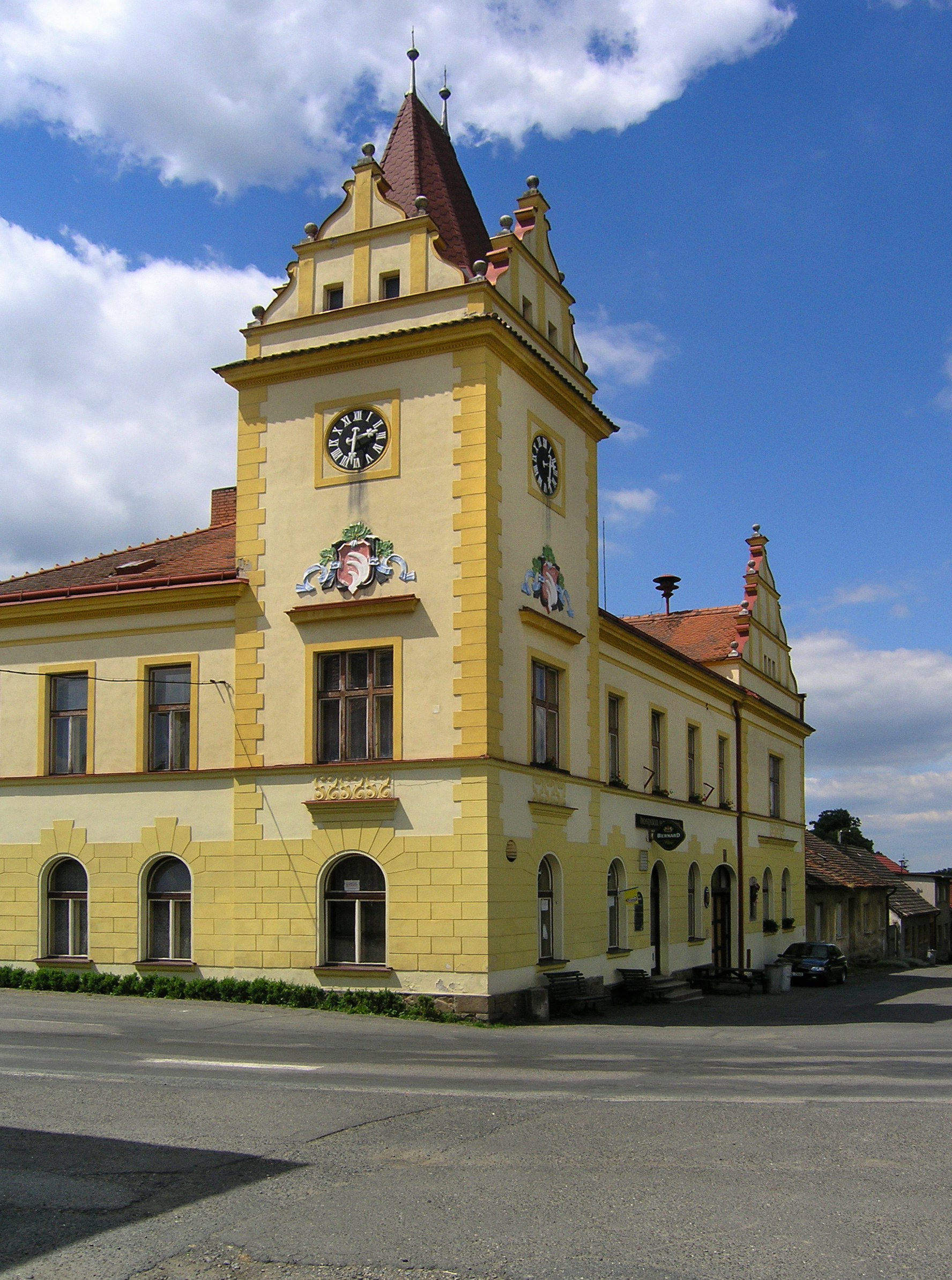
Town hall

The D1 motorway from Prague to Brno runs along the eastern municipal border.

== Sights ==
The main landmark of Křivsoudov is the Church of the Nativity of the Virgin Mary. It is a medieval Gothic church with Baroque modifications.

A valuable building is the pseudo-Renaissance town hall from the end of the 19th century.
