= Hosty =

- Municipality
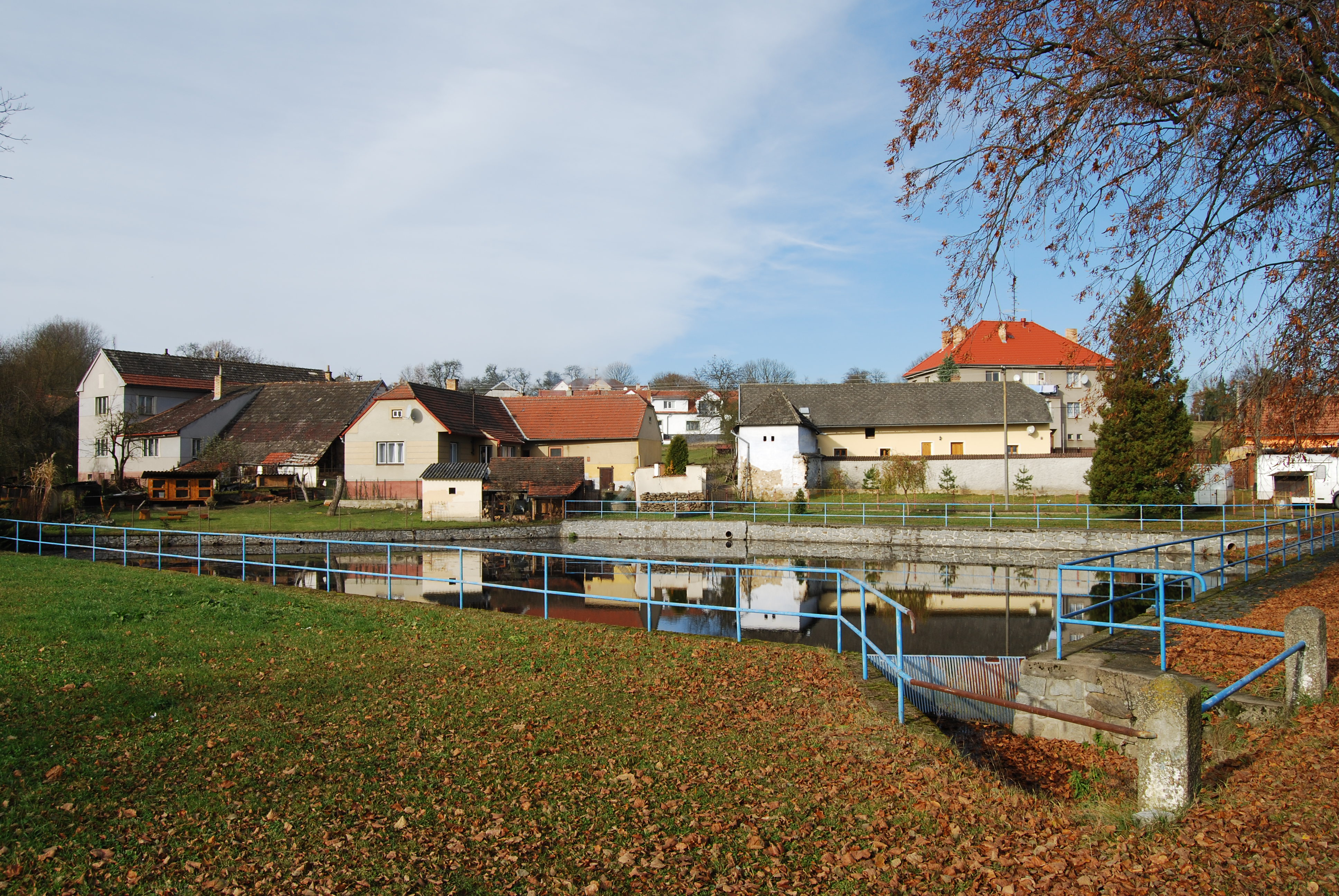
- Centre of Hosty

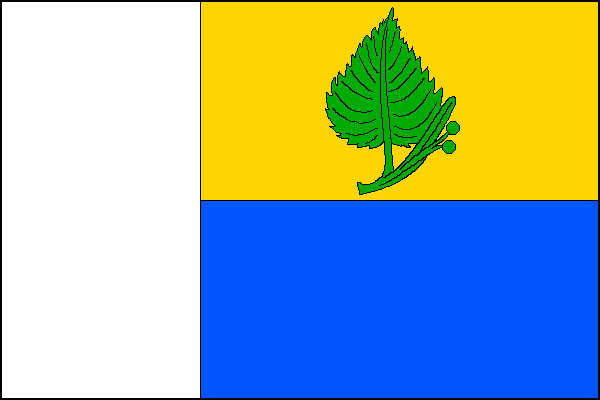
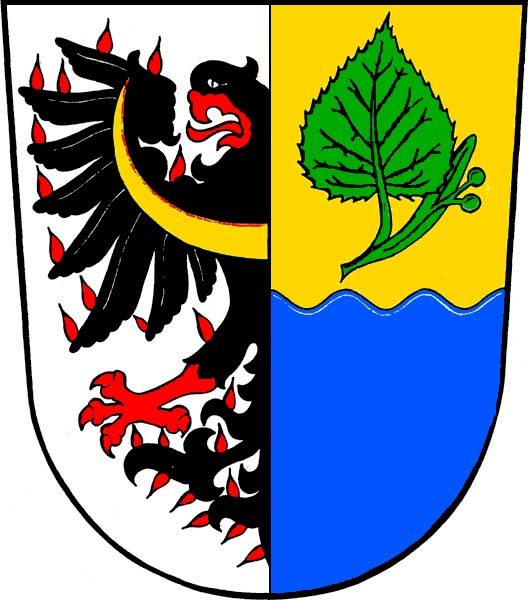
- Flag Coat of arms

- Location in the Czech Republic
- Coordinates: 49°15′37″N 14°23′36″E
- Country: Czech Republic
- Region: South Bohemian
- District: České Budějovice
- First mentioned: 1268

Area
  - Total: 8.57 km^{2} (3.31 sq mi)
- Elevation: 442 m (1,450 ft)

Population (2026-01-01)
  - Total: 167
  - Density: 19.5/km^{2} (50.5/sq mi)
- Time zone: UTC+1 (CET)
  - Summer (DST): UTC+2 (CEST)
- Postal code: 375 01
- Website: www.hosty.cz

Hosty is a municipality and village in České Budějovice District in the South Bohemian Region of the Czech Republic. It has about 200 inhabitants.

Hosty lies approximately 33 kilometres (21 mi) north of České Budějovice and 92 km (57 mi) south of Prague.

== Demographics ==
Historical population
Year	Pop.	±%
1869	453	—
1880	457	+0.9%
1890	512	+12.0%
1900	495	−3.3%
1910	532	+7.5%
1921	531	−0.2%
1930	446	−16.0%
1950	319	−28.5%
1961	310	−2.8%
1970	268	−13.5%
1980	224	−16.4%
1991	171	−23.7%
2001	159	−7.0%
2011	168	+5.7%
2021	163	−3.0%
Source: Censuses
