= Žlutice =

- Town
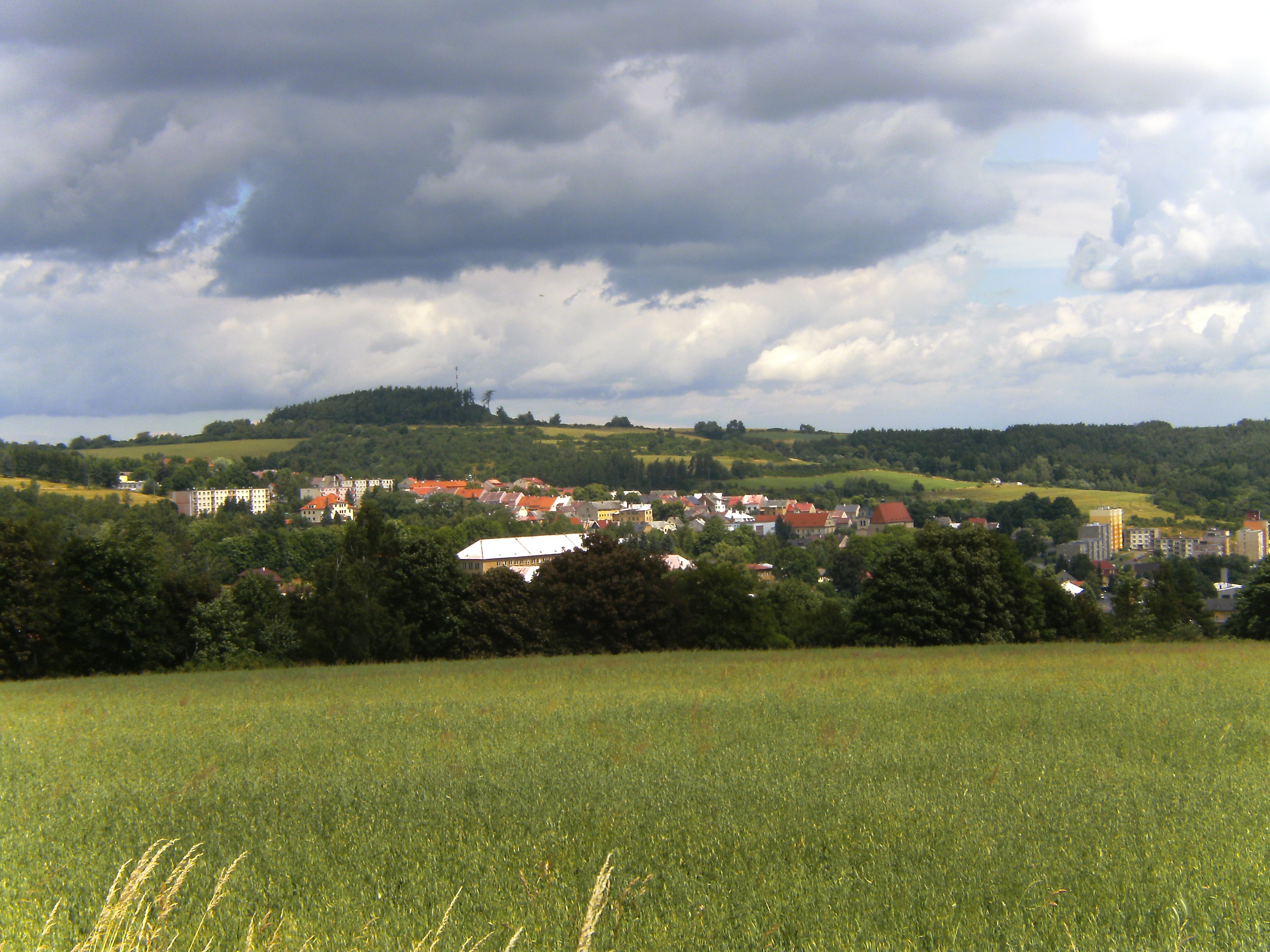
- General view of the town

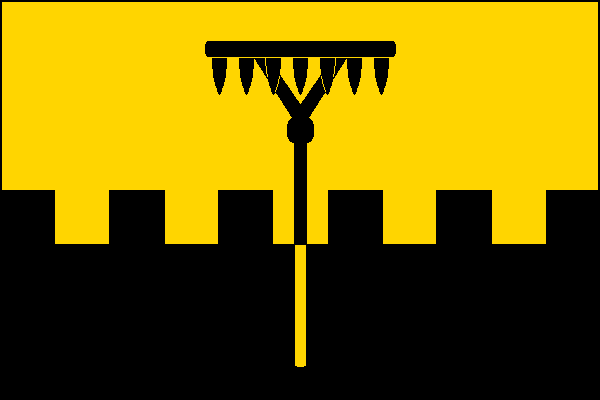
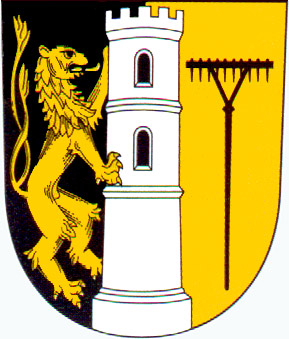
- Flag Coat of arms

- Location in the Czech Republic
- Coordinates: 50°5′30″N 13°9′45″E
- Country: Czech Republic
- Region: Karlovy Vary
- District: Karlovy Vary
- First mentioned: 1140

Government
  - Mayor: Helena Plitzová

Area
  - Total: 53.00 km^{2} (20.46 sq mi)
- Elevation: 497 m (1,631 ft)

Population (2026-01-01)
  - Total: 2,153
  - Density: 40.62/km^{2} (105.2/sq mi)
- Time zone: UTC+1 (CET)
  - Summer (DST): UTC+2 (CEST)
- Postal code: 364 52
- Website: www.zlutice.cz

Žlutice (Czech pronunciation: [ˈʒlucɪtsɛ]; German: Luditz) is a town in Karlovy Vary District in the Karlovy Vary Region of the Czech Republic. It has about 2,200 inhabitants. The historic town centre is well preserved and is protected as urban monument zone.

== Administrative division ==
Žlutice consists of nine municipal parts (in brackets population according to the 2021 census):

- Žlutice (1,973)
- Knínice (10)
- Protivec (63)
- Ratiboř (32)
- Skoky (0)
- Verušice (32)
- Veselov (42)
- Vladořice (4)
- Záhořice (2)

== Etymology ==
According to the most likely theory, the name is derived from the Czech word žlutý, i.e. 'yellow'. It refers to the banks of the river Střela, coloured yellow by clay. Less likely theories consider that the name comes from the personal name Žlut, or from the old Slavic tribe Lutičani.

== Geography ==
Žlutice is located about 26 kilometres (16 mi) southeast of Karlovy Vary. It lies mostly in the Teplá Highlands, only a small part of the municipal territory in the east extends into the Rakovník Uplands. The highest point is the hill Vladař at 693 m (2,274 ft) above sea level. The Střela River flows through the town and the Žlutice Reservoir is built on the river in the western part of the municipal territory.

== History ==
The first written mention of Žlutice is from 1140, when the village was donated to the Kladruby Monastery. Between 1306 and 1341, a fortified town was founded by Bohuslav of Rýzmburk on the site of the original village. During the Hussite Wars, the town was conquered by the Hussites. In 1430, Žlutice became property of the Hussite leader Jakoubek of Vřesovice. He had built here a new castle in 1455.

Knights of Vřesovice owned the town until 1537, when they sold it to Henry IV, Burgrave of Plauen. In 1575–1650, Žlutice was a property of the Knights of Kokořín. During the Thirty Years' War, the town was repeatedly conquered and looted by the Swedish troops. From 1650, Žlutice was ruled by the Hroznata family.

== Demographics ==
Historical population

Year	Pop.	±%
1869	3,443	—
1880	3,460	+0.5%
1890	3,376	−2.4%
1900	3,280	−2.8%
1910	3,307	+0.8%

Year	Pop.	±%
1921	3,524	+6.6%
1930	3,493	−0.9%
1950	1,899	−45.6%
1961	2,064	+8.7%
1970	2,195	+6.3%

Year	Pop.	±%
1980	2,532	+15.4%
1991	2,802	+10.7%
2001	2,869	+2.4%
2011	2,493	−13.1%
2021	2,158	−13.4%

Source: Censuses

== Transport ==
The I/6 road (part of the European route E48), which replaces the incomplete section of the D6 motorway from Prague to Karlovy Vary, briefly passes through the northern part of the municipal territory.

Žlutice is located on the railway line Rakovník–Bečov nad Teplou. The territory is served by three train stations and stops: Žlutice, Záhořice and Protivec.

== Sights ==
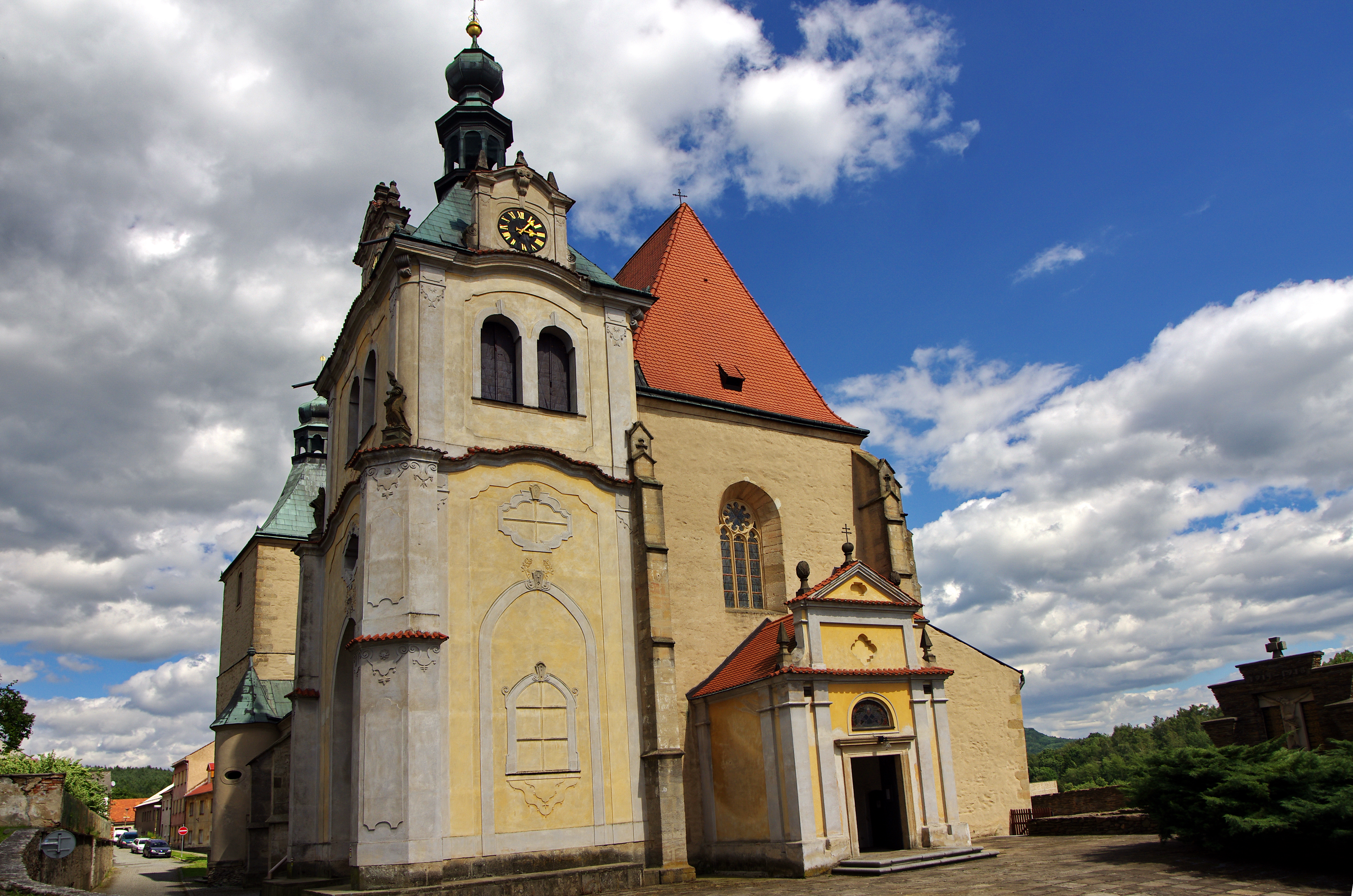
Church of Saints Peter and Paul

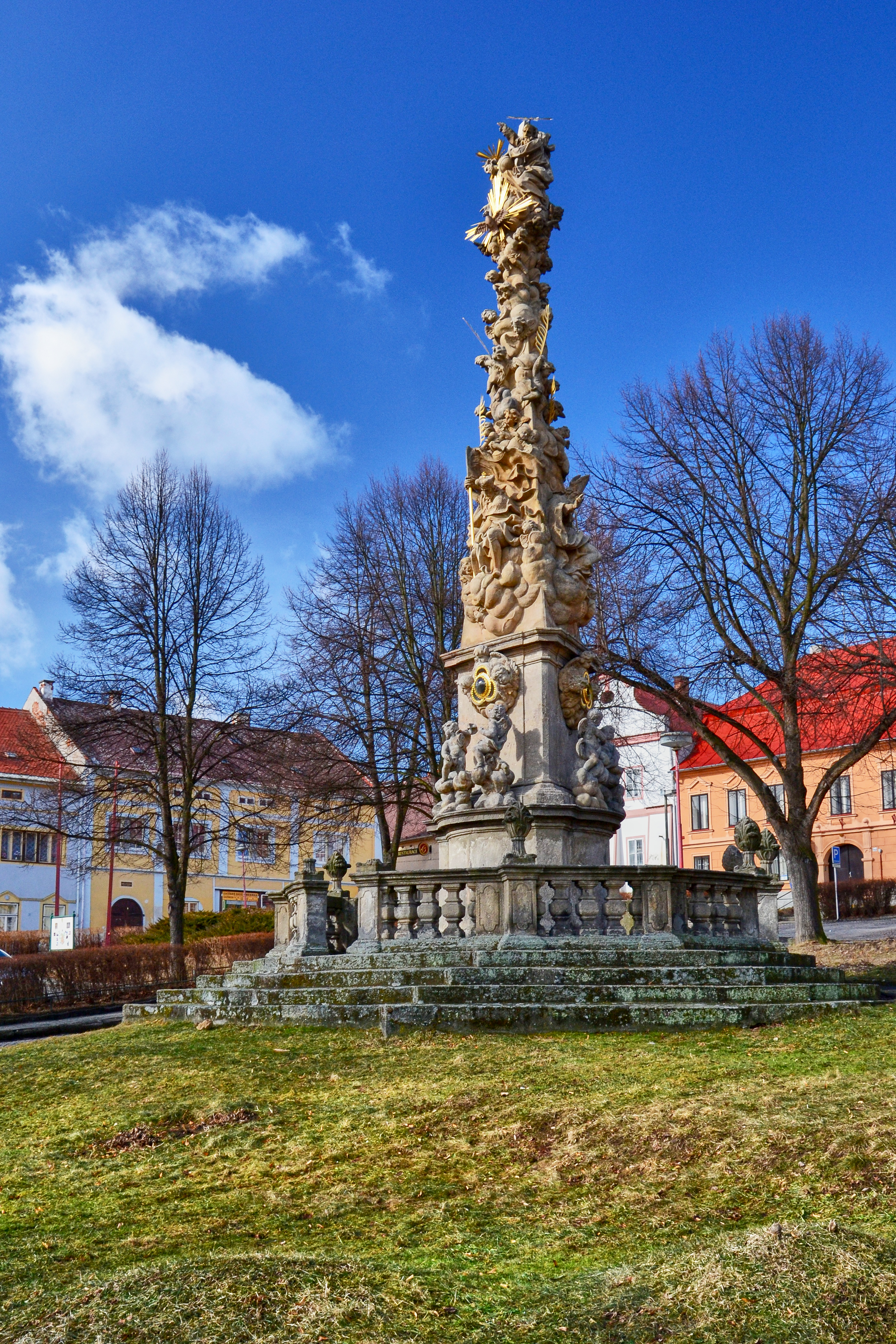
Holy Trinity Column

The main landmark of the town centre is the Church of Saints Peter and Paul. The construction of the Gothic church started after 1350 and was finished in the last quarter of the 15th century. Baroque modifications were made in the 17th century. In 1782, the wooden bell tower was replaced by a brick one.

The town hall has a rich architectural history and is among the most valuable buildings in the town. It was originally a late Gothic house from the early 16th century, which served as the town hall from 1537. In 1597, it was rebuilt in the Renaissance style. After it was damaged by a fire, it was reconstructed in a late Baroque style in 1779–1781. Late Neoclassical modifications were finished in 1837. Gothic cellars have survived to this day.

In the centre of the town square is the Holy Trinity Column. The Baroque column was created by Oswald Josef Wenda in 1701–1704, probably according to the design by Petr Brandl. It is 13 m (43 ft) high.

The Church of Saint Nicholas is originally a Gothic building from the 14th century, rebuilt in the Baroque style in 1756. It is a cemetery church located outside the built-up area.

The Church of the Visitation of Our Lady is located in Skoky. It is a Baroque pilgrimage church, built in 1736–1738.

== Notable people ==
- Emanuel Wirth (1842–1923), German violinist

== Twin towns – sister cities ==
Žlutice is twinned with:

- Hurbanovo, Slovakia
- Warmensteinach, Germany

== Gallery ==
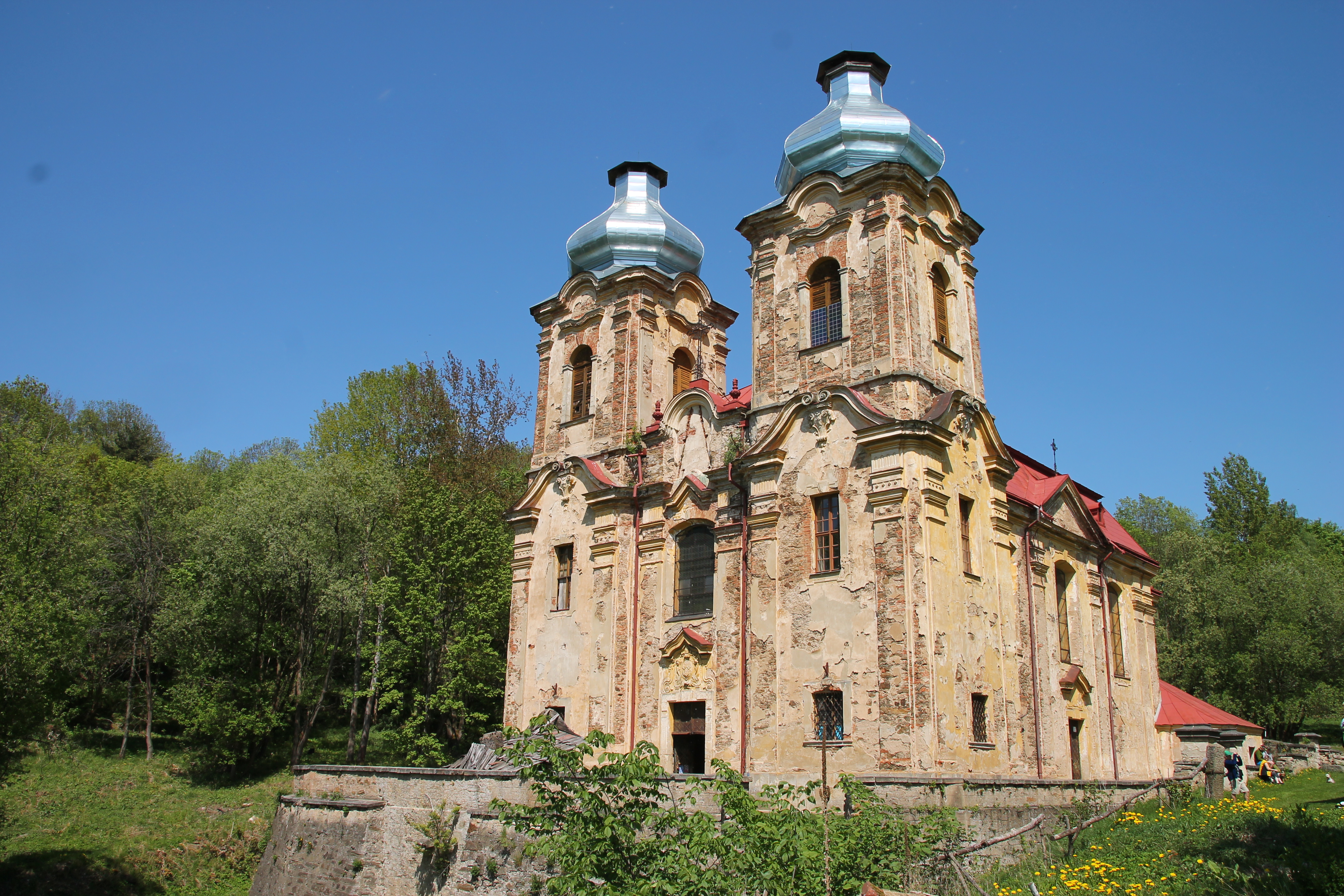
Church of the Visitation of Our Lady in Skoky

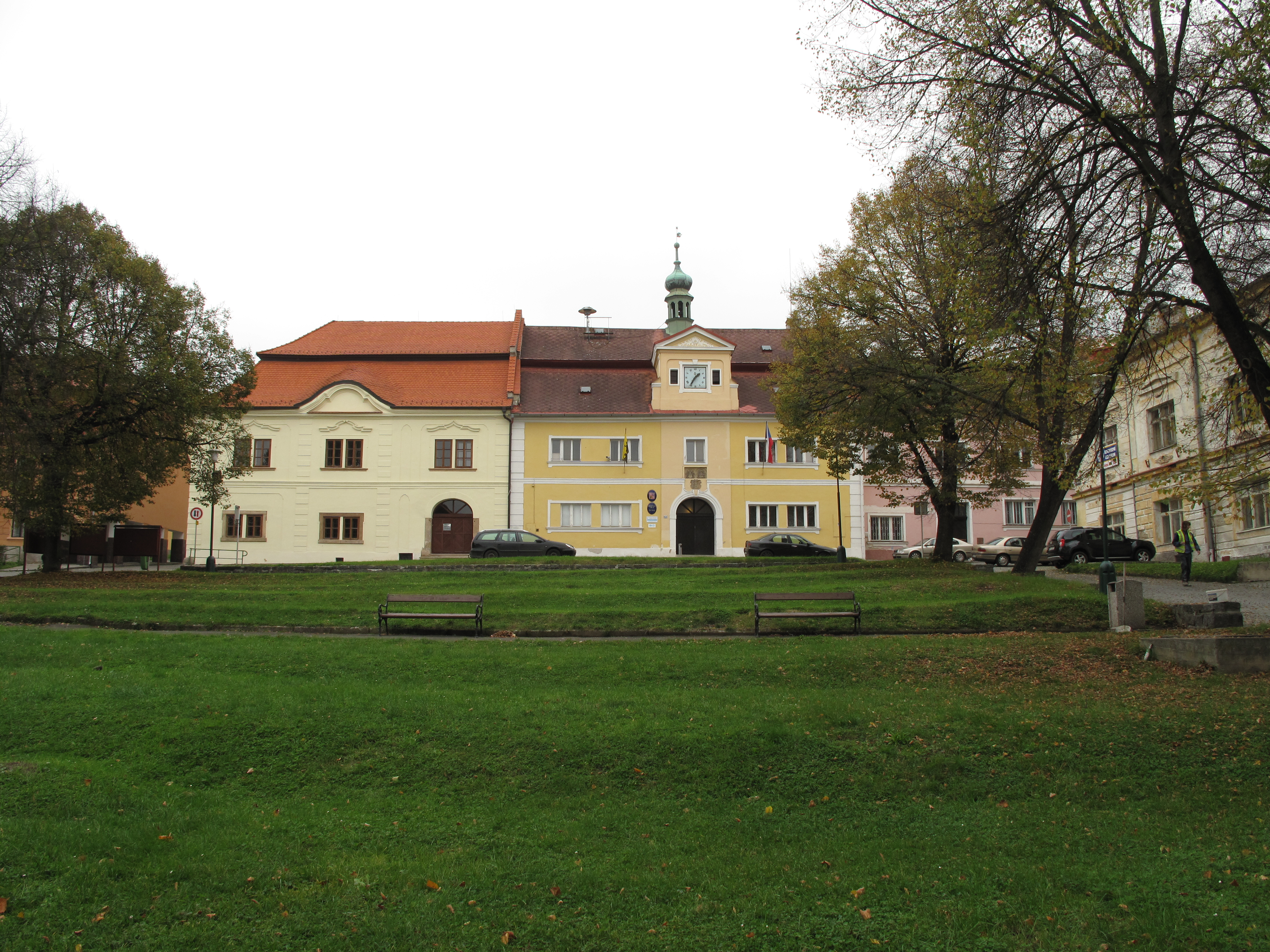
Town hall on the square Velké náměstí

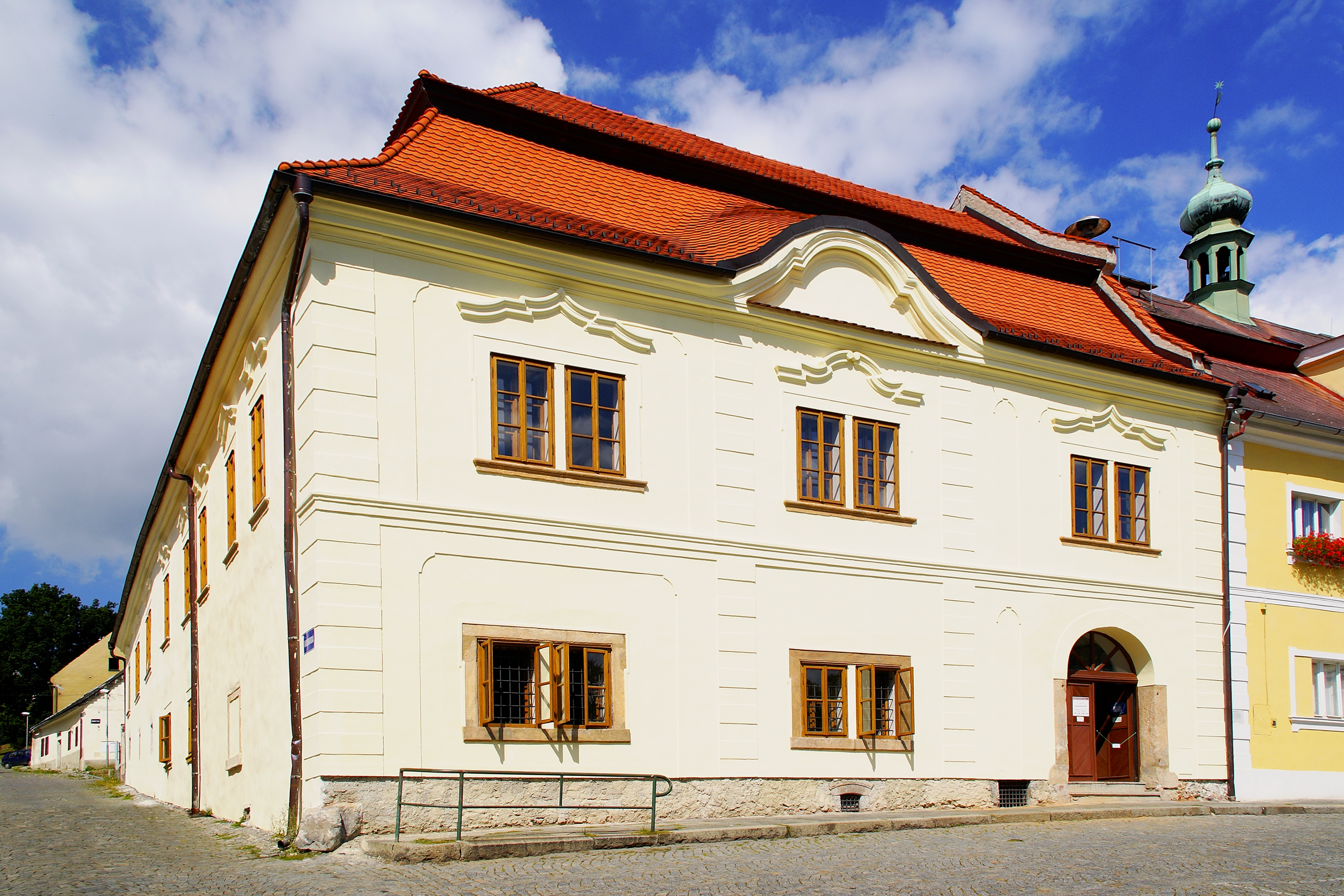
Baroque house, now a museum
