= Popovice (Brno-Country District) =

- Municipality
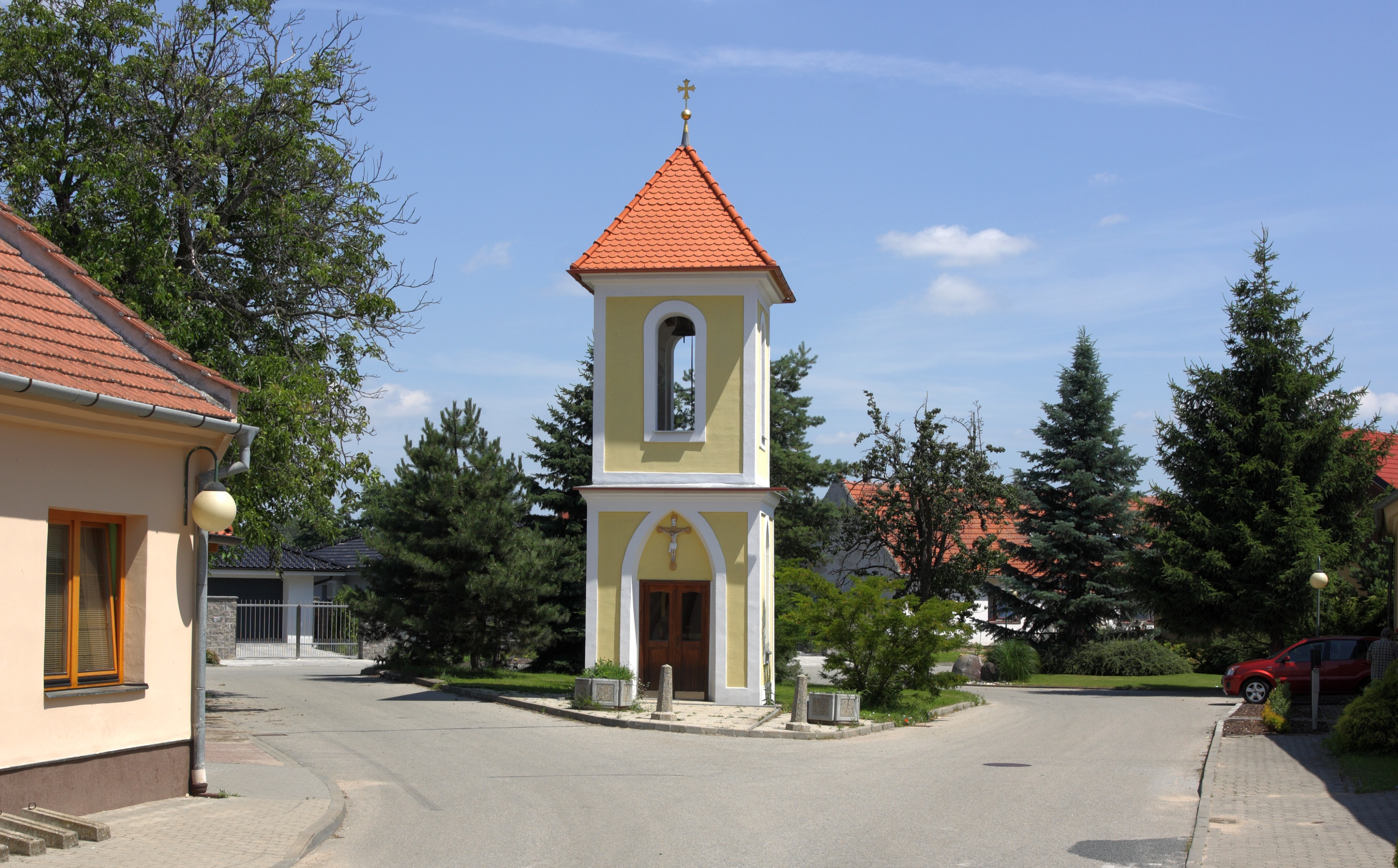
- Belfry in the centre of Popovice

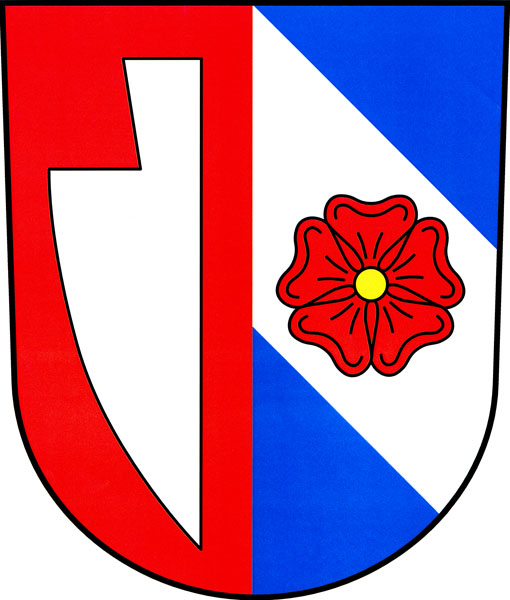
- Flag Coat of arms

- Location in the Czech Republic
- Coordinates: 49°6′26″N 16°36′58″E
- Country: Czech Republic
- Region: South Moravian
- District: Brno-Country
- First mentioned: 1406

Area
  - Total: 2.62 km^{2} (1.01 sq mi)
- Elevation: 189 m (620 ft)

Population (2026-01-01)
  - Total: 381
  - Density: 145/km^{2} (377/sq mi)
- Time zone: UTC+1 (CET)
  - Summer (DST): UTC+2 (CEST)
- Postal code: 664 61
- Website: www.obecpopovice.cz

Popovice is a municipality and village in Brno-Country District in the South Moravian Region of the Czech Republic. It has about 400 inhabitants.

Popovice lies approximately 11 kilometres (7 mi) south of Brno and 192 km (119 mi) south-east of Prague.

== History ==
The first written mention of Popovice is from 1406.

== Demographics ==
Historical population
Year	Pop.	±%
1869	194	—
1880	209	+7.7%
1890	205	−1.9%
1900	213	+3.9%
1910	209	−1.9%
1921	245	+17.2%
1930	267	+9.0%
1950	254	−4.9%
1961	252	−0.8%
1970	255	+1.2%
1980	235	−7.8%
1991	230	−2.1%
2001	247	+7.4%
2011	337	+36.4%
2021	361	+7.1%
Source: Censuses
