= Štichovice =

- Municipality
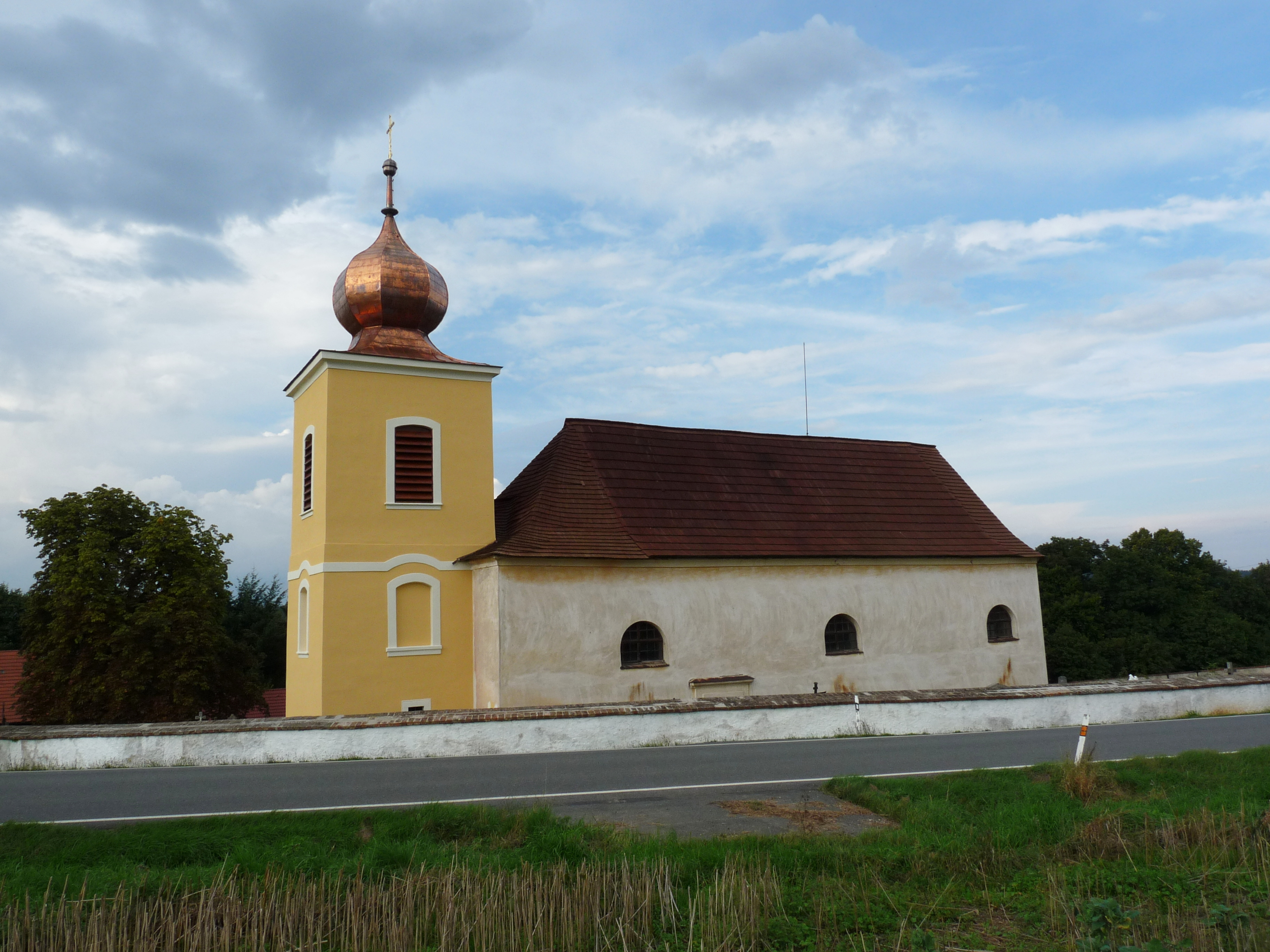
- Church of Saints Peter and Paul

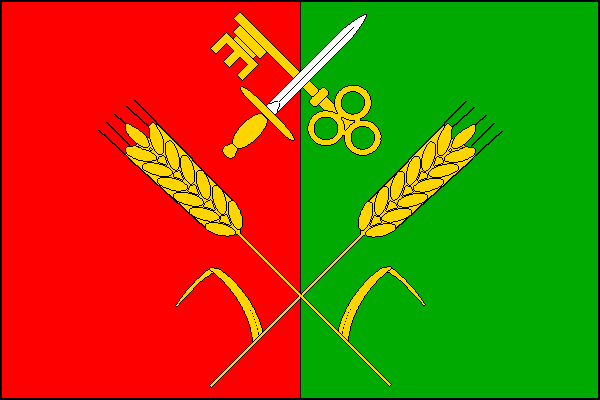
- Flag Coat of arms

- Location in the Czech Republic
- Coordinates: 49°58′40″N 13°18′10″E
- Country: Czech Republic
- Region: Plzeň
- District: Plzeň-North
- First mentioned: 1454

Area
  - Total: 11.20 km^{2} (4.32 sq mi)
- Elevation: 458 m (1,503 ft)

Population (2026-01-01)
  - Total: 119
  - Density: 10.6/km^{2} (27.5/sq mi)
- Time zone: UTC+1 (CET)
  - Summer (DST): UTC+2 (CEST)
- Postal code: 331 41
- Website: www.stichovice.cz

Štichovice is a municipality and village in Plzeň-North District in the Plzeň Region of the Czech Republic. It has about 100 inhabitants.

Štichovice lies approximately 26 kilometres (16 mi) north of Plzeň and 81 km (50 mi) west of Prague.

== Administrative division ==
Štichovice consists of two municipal parts (in brackets population according to the 2021 census):

- Štichovice (84)
- Křečov (21)

== Demographics ==
Historical population
Year	Pop.	±%
1869	336	—
1880	291	−13.4%
1890	307	+5.5%
1900	280	−8.8%
1910	266	−5.0%
1921	264	−0.8%
1930	240	−9.1%
1950	190	−20.8%
1961	175	−7.9%
1970	164	−6.3%
1980	131	−20.1%
1991	118	−9.9%
2001	125	+5.9%
2011	122	−2.4%
2021	105	−13.9%
Source: Censuses
