= Soutice =

Petroupim
- Municipality
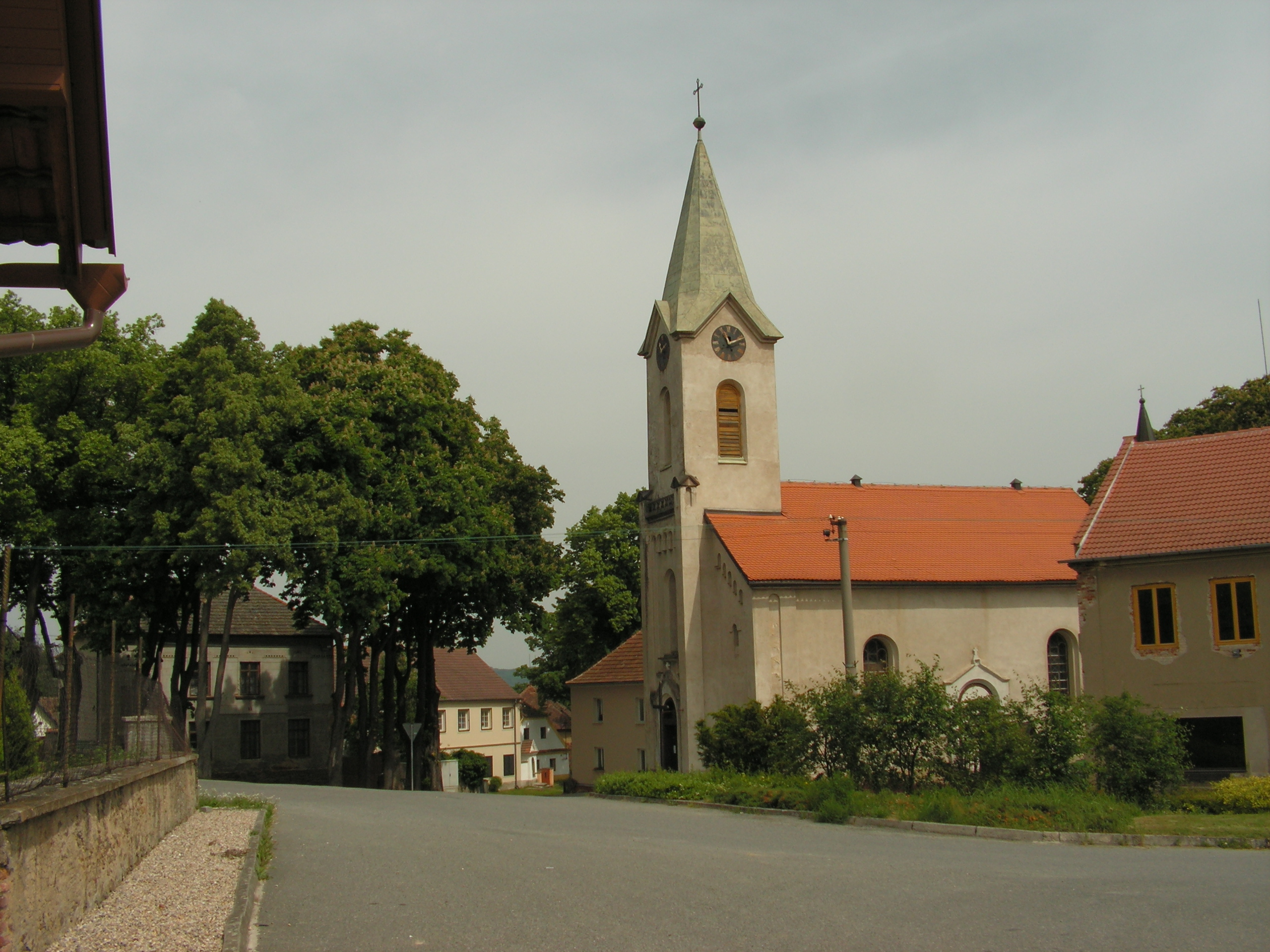
- Church of Saint James the Great

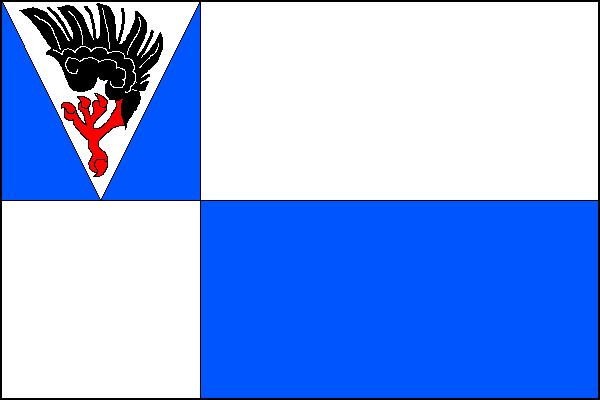
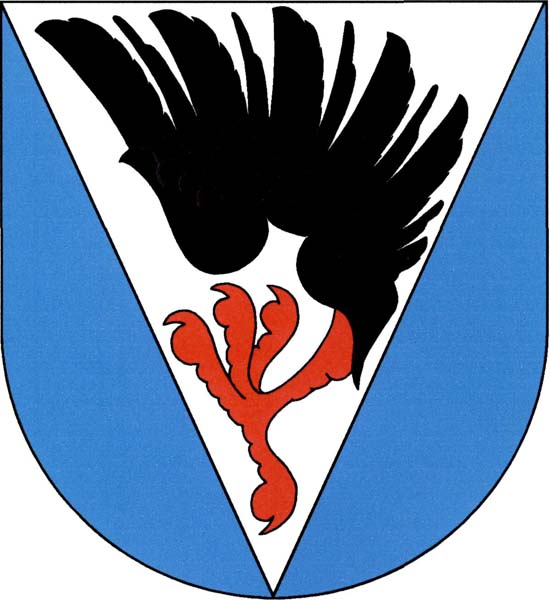
- Flag Coat of arms

- Location in the Czech Republic
- Coordinates: 49°43′34″N 15°3′11″E
- Country: Czech Republic
- Region: Central Bohemian
- District: Benešov
- First mentioned: 1295

Area
  - Total: 10.88 km^{2} (4.20 sq mi)
- Elevation: 378 m (1,240 ft)

Population (2026-01-01)
  - Total: 272
  - Density: 25.0/km^{2} (64.7/sq mi)
- Time zone: UTC+1 (CET)
  - Summer (DST): UTC+2 (CEST)
- Postal codes: 257 63, 257 71
- Website: www.soutice.cz

Soutice is a municipality and village in Benešov District in the Central Bohemian Region of the Czech Republic. It has about 300 inhabitants.

== Administrative division ==
Soutice consists of three municipal parts (in brackets population according to the 2021 census):

- Soutice (185)
- Černýš (25)
- Kalná (32)

== Etymology ==
The initial name of Soutice was Sutice. The name was derived either from the old Czech word sutý ('deposed') of from the personal name Sut (meaning "the village of Sut's people").

== Geography ==
Soutice is located about 27 kilometres (17 mi) east of Benešov and 52 km (32 mi) southeast of Prague. It lies in the Vlašim Uplands. The highest point is at 451 m (1,480 ft) above sea level. The Sázava River forms the northern municipal border. The Želivka River flows through the municipality and then joins the Sázava.

== History ==
The first written mention of Soutice is from 1295. It was the centre of a small estate. Until the 1440s, the estate was owned by a local noble family. Even in the following centuries, the estate was the property of various less important noble families.

== Demographics ==
Historical population

Year	Pop.	±%
1869	920	—
1880	950	+3.3%
1890	891	−6.2%
1900	918	+3.0%
1910	844	−8.1%

Year	Pop.	±%
1921	783	−7.2%
1930	663	−15.3%
1950	505	−23.8%
1961	505	+0.0%
1970	429	−15.0%

Year	Pop.	±%
1980	336	−21.7%
1991	267	−20.5%
2001	224	−16.1%
2011	249	+11.2%
2021	242	−2.8%

Source: Censuses

== Transport ==
The D1 motorway from Prague to Brno runs through the municipality.

== Sights ==
The main landmark of Soutice is the Church of Saint James the Great. Its tower is of Romanesque origin. The chancel probably dates from the second half of the 16th century. In 1864, the church was rebuilt in the Neo-Romanesque style.

A notable building is the Soutice Castle. it was originally a Gothic-Renaissance fortress, rebuilt into the castle in 1674. Today, the castle is in a state of disrepair and is unused.
