= Kozojedy (Plzeň-North District) =

- Municipality
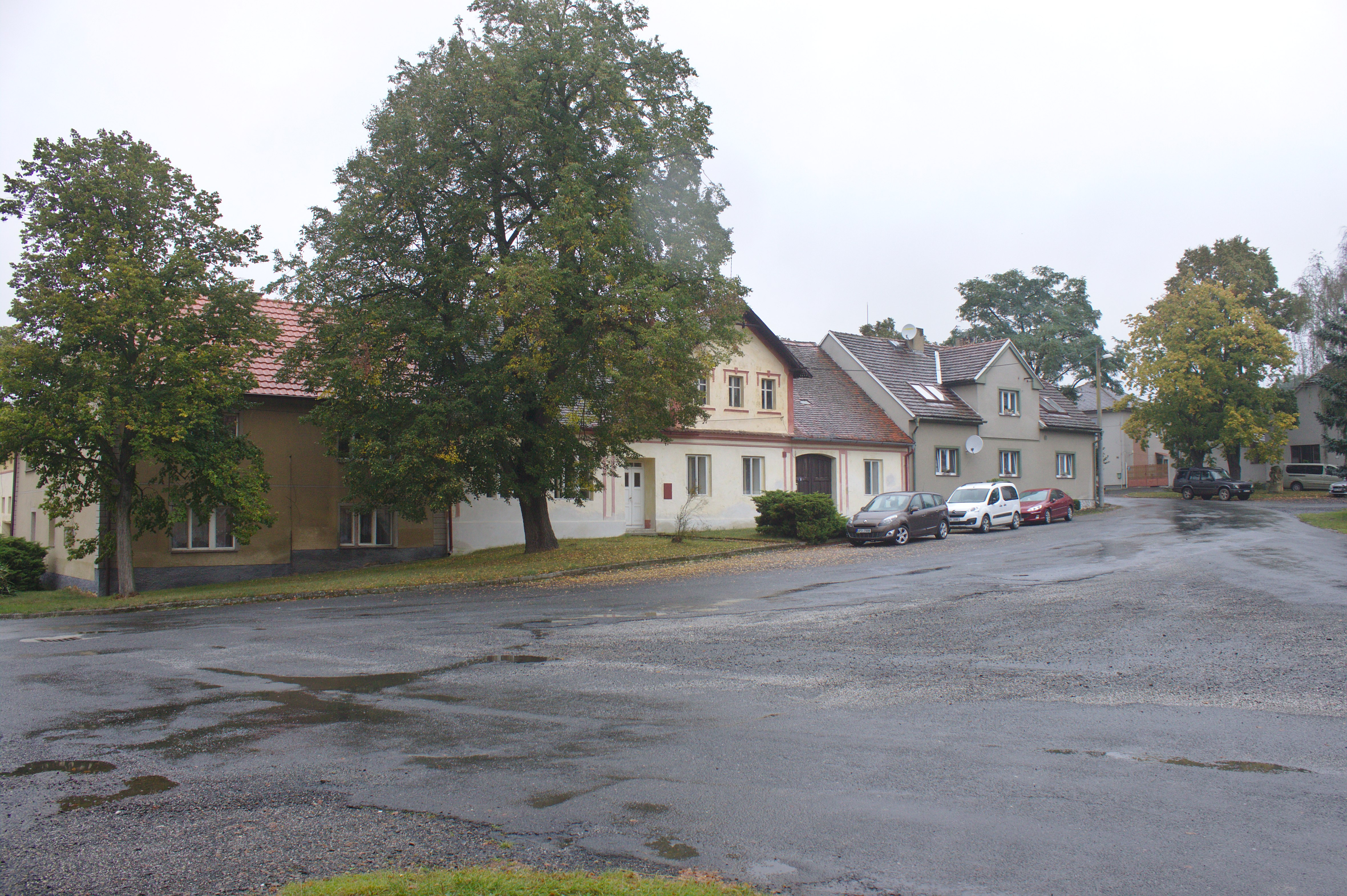
- Centre of Kozojedy

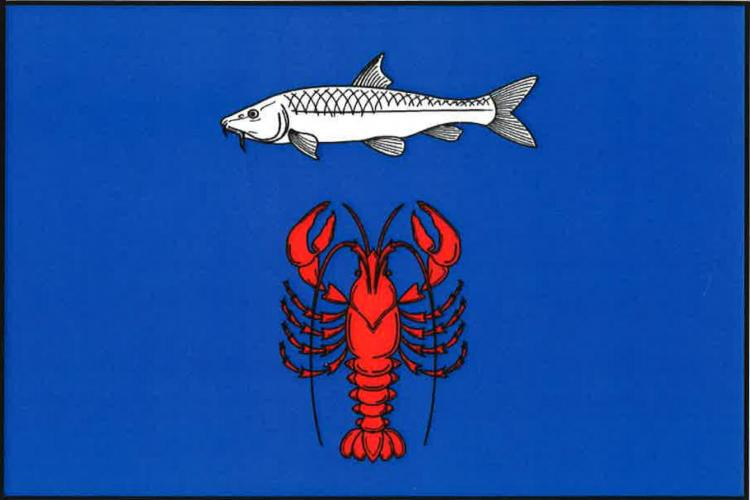
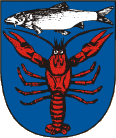
- Flag Coat of arms

- Location in the Czech Republic
- Coordinates: 49°55′53″N 13°32′33″E
- Country: Czech Republic
- Region: Plzeň
- District: Plzeň-North
- First mentioned: 1352

Area
  - Total: 23.06 km^{2} (8.90 sq mi)
- Elevation: 355 m (1,165 ft)

Population (2026-01-01)
  - Total: 642
  - Density: 27.8/km^{2} (72.1/sq mi)
- Time zone: UTC+1 (CET)
  - Summer (DST): UTC+2 (CEST)
- Postal code: 331 41
- Website: www.obeckozojedy.eu

Kozojedy is a municipality and village in Plzeň-North District in the Plzeň Region of the Czech Republic. It has about 600 inhabitants.

== Administrative division ==
Kozojedy consists of five municipal parts (in brackets population according to the 2021 census):

- Kozojedy (402)
- Borek (28)
- Břízsko (59)
- Lednice (80)
- Robčice (15)

== Demographics ==
Historical population
Year	Pop.	±%
1869	1,101	—
1880	1,040	−5.5%
1890	1,016	−2.3%
1900	1,035	+1.9%
1910	1,039	+0.4%
1921	1,059	+1.9%
1930	925	−12.7%
1950	736	−20.4%
1961	710	−3.5%
1970	595	−16.2%
1980	623	+4.7%
1991	590	−5.3%
2001	621	+5.3%
2011	614	−1.1%
2021	584	−4.9%
Source: Censuses
