= Teplá Vltava =

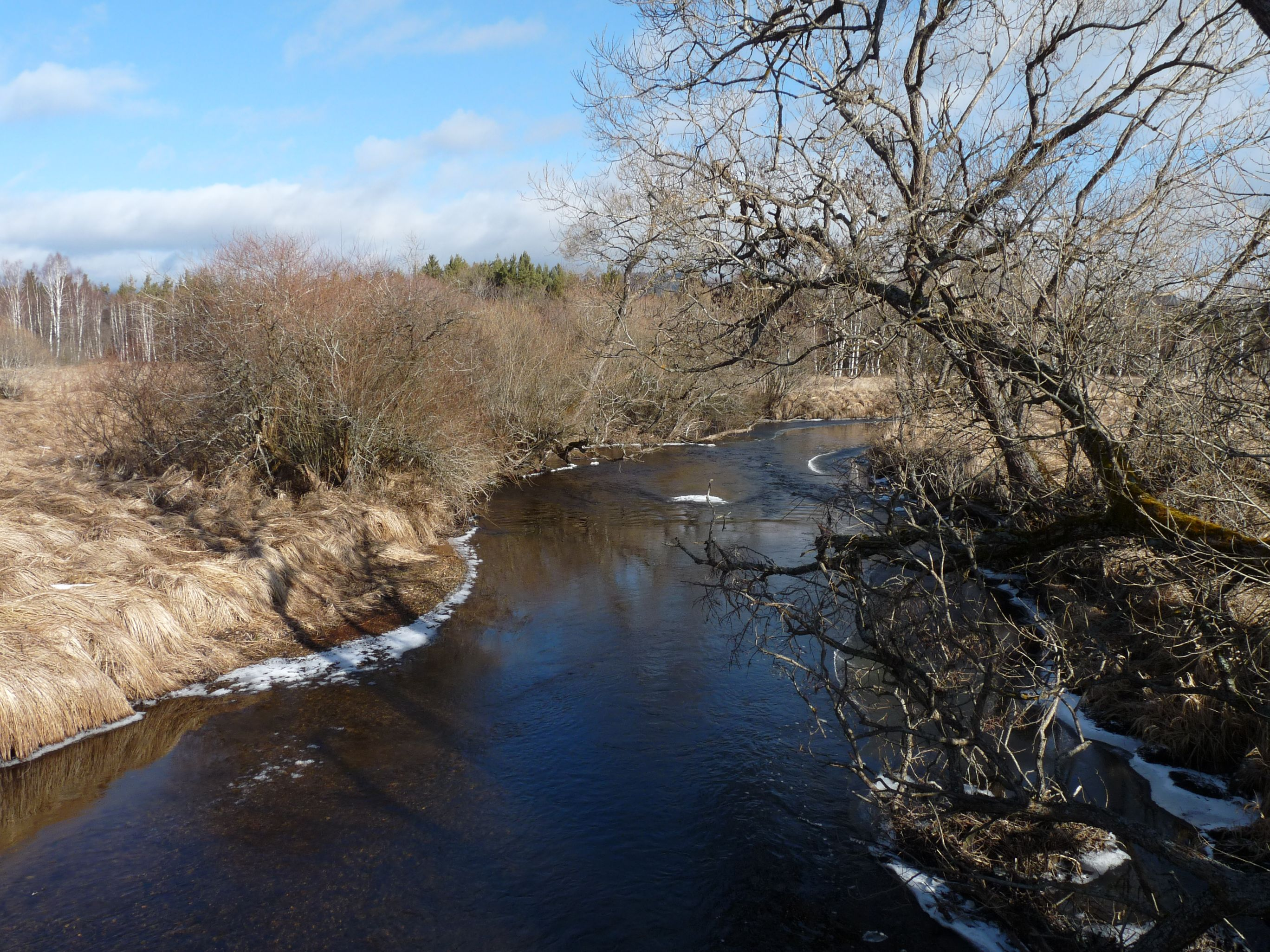
- The Teplá Vltava near Volary

Location
- Country: Czech Republic
- Region: South Bohemian

Physical characteristics
- Source
  - location: Kvilda, Bohemian Forest
  - coordinates: 48°58′29″N 13°33′39″E
  - elevation: 1,174 m (3,852 ft)
- Mouth
  - location: Vltava
  - coordinates: 48°51′33″N 13°53′35″E
  - elevation: 731 m (2,398 ft)
- Length: 54.3 km (33.7 mi)
- Basin size: 347.6 km^{2} (134.2 sq mi)
- Discharge
  - average: 5.9 m^{3}/s (210 cu ft/s) near estuary

Basin features
- Progression: Vltava→ Elbe→ North Sea

The Teplá Vltava (Czech pronunciation: [ˈtɛplaː ˈvl̩tava]) is a river in the Czech Republic, the main source of the Vltava River. It flows through the South Bohemian Region. Until its confluence with the Studená Vltava when it further continues as the Vltava, the Teplá Vltava is 54.3 km (33.7 mi) long.

== Etymology ==
The name Vltava is derived from the Proto-Germanic words wilt-ahwa, i.e. 'wild water'. The attribute teplá means 'warm', compared to the Studená Vltava, i.e. 'cold Vltava'.

== Characteristic ==
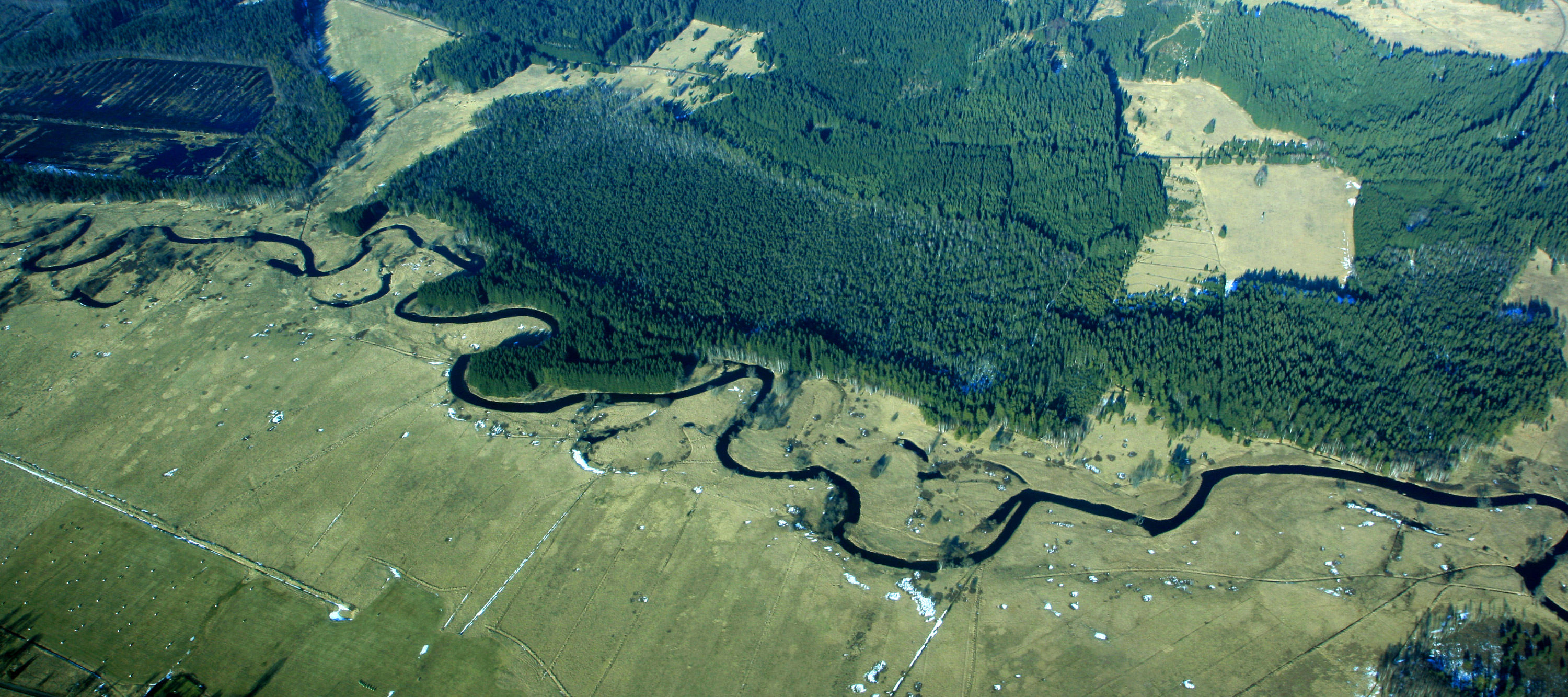
Meanders of the Teplá Vltava

From a water management point of view, the Vltava and Teplá Vltava are one river with single numbering of river kilometres. The Teplá Vltava originates in the territory of Kvilda in the Bohemian Forest at an elevation of 1,174 m (3,852 ft), on the slope of the Černá hora Mountain, and flows to the Pěkná exclave of the Nová Pec municipality, where it merges with the Studená Vltava River at an elevation of 731 m (2,398 ft) and continues as Vltava. It is 54.3 km (33.7 mi) long. Its drainage basin has an area of 347.58 km^{2} (134.20 sq mi), of which 26.34 km^{2} (10.17 sq mi) is in Germany and 321.24 km^{2} (124.03 sq mi) is in the Czech Republic.

The longest tributaries of the Teplá Vltava are:

Tributary	Length (km)	River km	Side
Řasnice	20.9	394.3	right
Volarský potok	11.1	378.9	left
Vltavský potok	9.3	415.3	right
Vydří potok	9.1	416.8	left

== Course ==
The river flows through the municipal territories of Kvilda, Borová Lada, Horní Vltavice, Lenora, Volary, Stožec and Nová Pec.

== Bodies of water ==
There are 102 bodies of water in the basin area, but none of them is significant. The largest of them is the artificial lake Žďárecké jezírko with an area of 1.6 ha (4.0 acres), supplied by the Častá Brook.

== Nature ==
The entire course of the river is located within the Šumava National Park and Šumava Protected Landscape Area. Among the common species of fish in the Teplá Vltava are river trout, European bullhead, burbot and grayling.

== Tourism ==
The Teplá Vltava is suitable for river tourism, but due to its location in a protected area, paddling is only permitted under certain conditions.

== See also ==
- List of rivers of the Czech Republic
