= Dreisesselberg (Bavarian Forest) =

Mountain in Germany

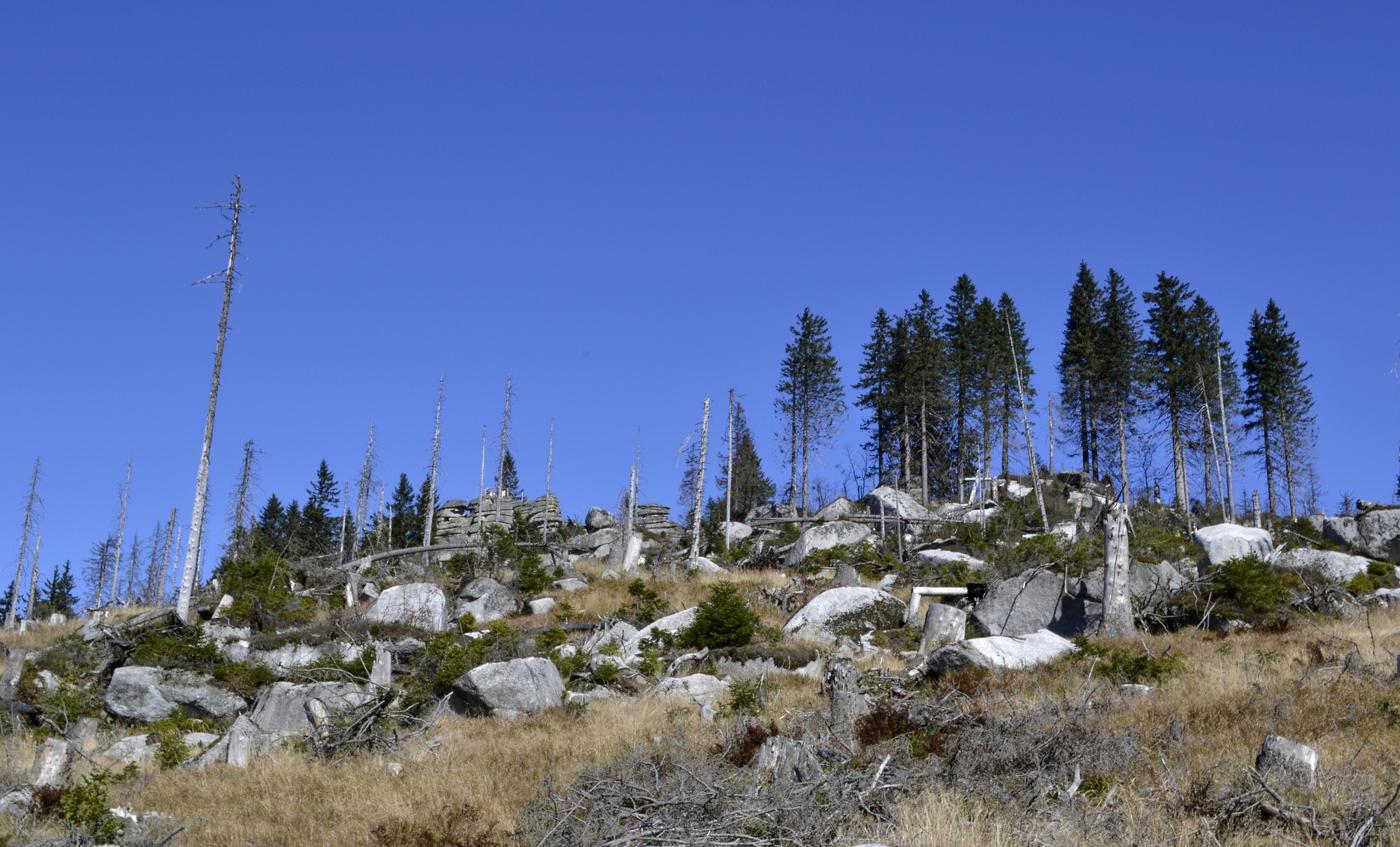
- View of the summit of the Dreisesselberg

Highest point
- Elevation: 1,333 m above sea level (NN) (4,373 ft)
- Isolation: 1.1 km → Mountain ridge
- Coordinates: 48°47′5″N 13°48′9″E

Geography
- Location within Bavaria
- Location: Bavaria, Lower Bavaria, Freyung-Grafenau
- Parent range: Bavarian Forest

Geology
- Rock type: coarse-grained granite

The Dreisesselberg (Czech: Třístoličník) is a mountain in Bavaria, Germany, in the Bavarian Forest that is 1,333 metres high.

== Location ==
The Dreisesselberg is located in the eastern part of Lower Bavaria in the county of Freyung-Grafenau. It rises southeast of the village of Haidmühle and northeast of the village of Neureichenau.

The Czech border runs some 370 metres southeast of the summit of the Dreisesselberg. The tripoint between Germany, Austria and the Czech Republic lies not far from the summit of the Plöckenstein, about 3 kilometres southeast of the Dreisesselberg (as the crow flies).

== Description ==
At the highest point of the most heavily forested mountain of Dreisessel, called Hochstein, is a distinctive granite rock with a summit cross, from which one can enjoy the view.

Approximately 450 metres due south of the Dreisesselberg's summit is the Dreisesselfels, three bizarre granite rock formations, with pillow-like shaped rocks formed by woolsack weathering. Just north of these rocks is the Dreisesselhaus (1,312 m) and the managed mountain inn of Dreisessel. A few metres to the east runs the German-Czech border.

There is a road up to the Dreisesselhaus, so the Dreisselberg is often quite busy. Waymarked hiking trails lead to the summit from all directions, for example, from the Kreuzbachklause, from Haidmühle-Frauenberg or Czech Nové Údolí.

On the western slopes of the Dreisesselberg, the Habergrasberg (1,235 m), is the Dreisessel Lift, a ski lift with a base station in Haidmühle-Frauenberg that is no longer in operation. On the Dreisesselberg, on the Bavarian side, is a nature reserve covering about 270 hectares. Those parts of the eastern slopes on Czech territory are part of the Bohemian Forest National Park.

From the Dreisesselberg, a ridge, the Hochkamm, leads across to the Bavarian Plöckenstein (1,365 m) and via the tripoint between Germany, Austria and the Czech Republic (1,321 m) to the Austro-Czech border on the main summit of the Plöckenstein (1378.3 m). It runs along the German-Czech border and then on the Austria-Czech border. Just below them is on the Czech territory Plöckensteinersee, the southernmost glacial lake of the Bohemian Forest.

Especially in winter, the Dreisesselberg offers views on the Alps. During the good conditions, it is also possible to observe the Grossglockner (206 km away).

== Summit crags ==
The summit crags with the granites on the Dreisessel have been designated by the Bavarian Department of the Environment (LfU) as a geo-scientifically valuable geotope (Geotope no.: 272R024). They were awarded the official seal of "Bavaria's most beautiful geotopes" by the LfU.

== History ==
According to a legend, which also Adalbert Stifter describes in Hochwald, the kings of Bavaria, Bohemia and Austria gathered on the top of the Dreisesselberg, to negotiate the limits of their dominions. In reality, the name Dreisesselberg ("three chairs") was not used until the 17th century, first for the remarkable group of rocks at the summit, but soon the whole mountain. The actual frontier was only fixed in 1765 between the Bishopric of Passau and Archduchy of Austria and surveyed in 1767. As well as mentioning the Dreisesselberg in his story, Hochwald, Adalbert Stifter also mentioned it in his last novel, Witiko, and in his final story, Aus dem baierischen Walde (both 1867), a literary monument. His reports of the Dreisesselberg was already a popular destination for hikers. In 1888 the Dreisesselberg branch of the Bavarian Forest Club had built the first refuge hut on the mountain. Next to this hut built in 1913, the current building was erected, which was modernized in the 1960s.

== Gallery ==
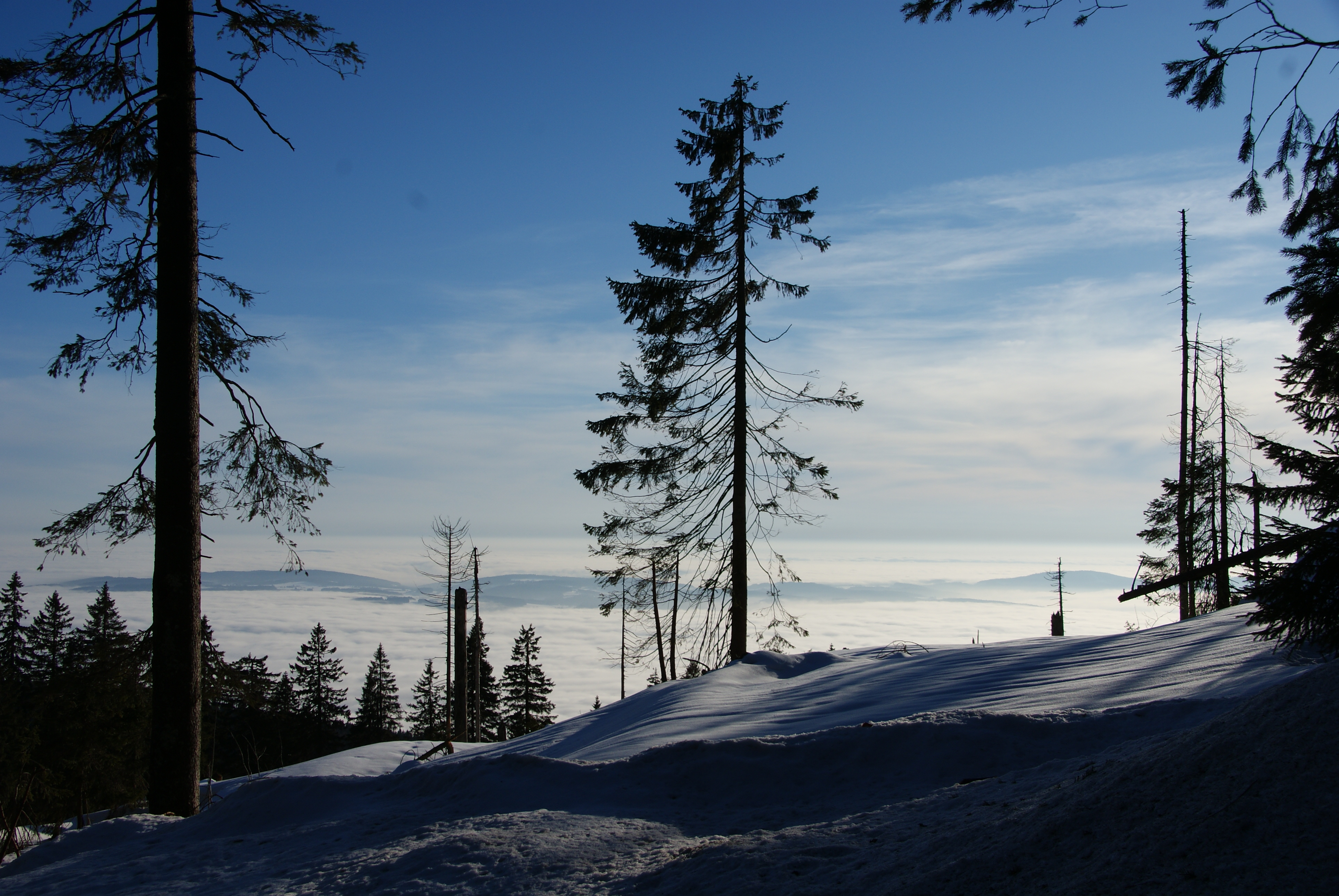
View looking southwest over the sea of fog in the valley

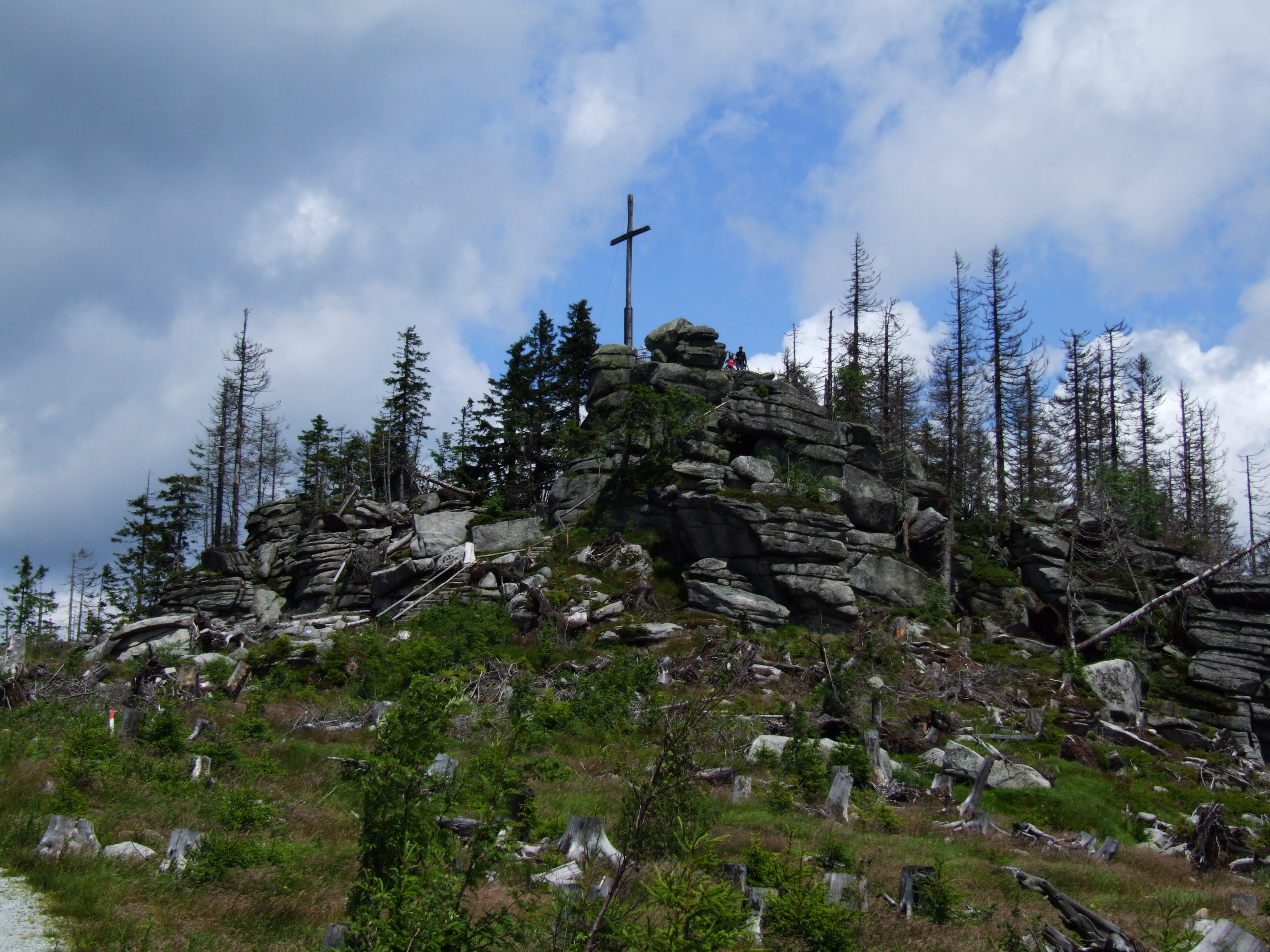
Summit cross of the Hochstein

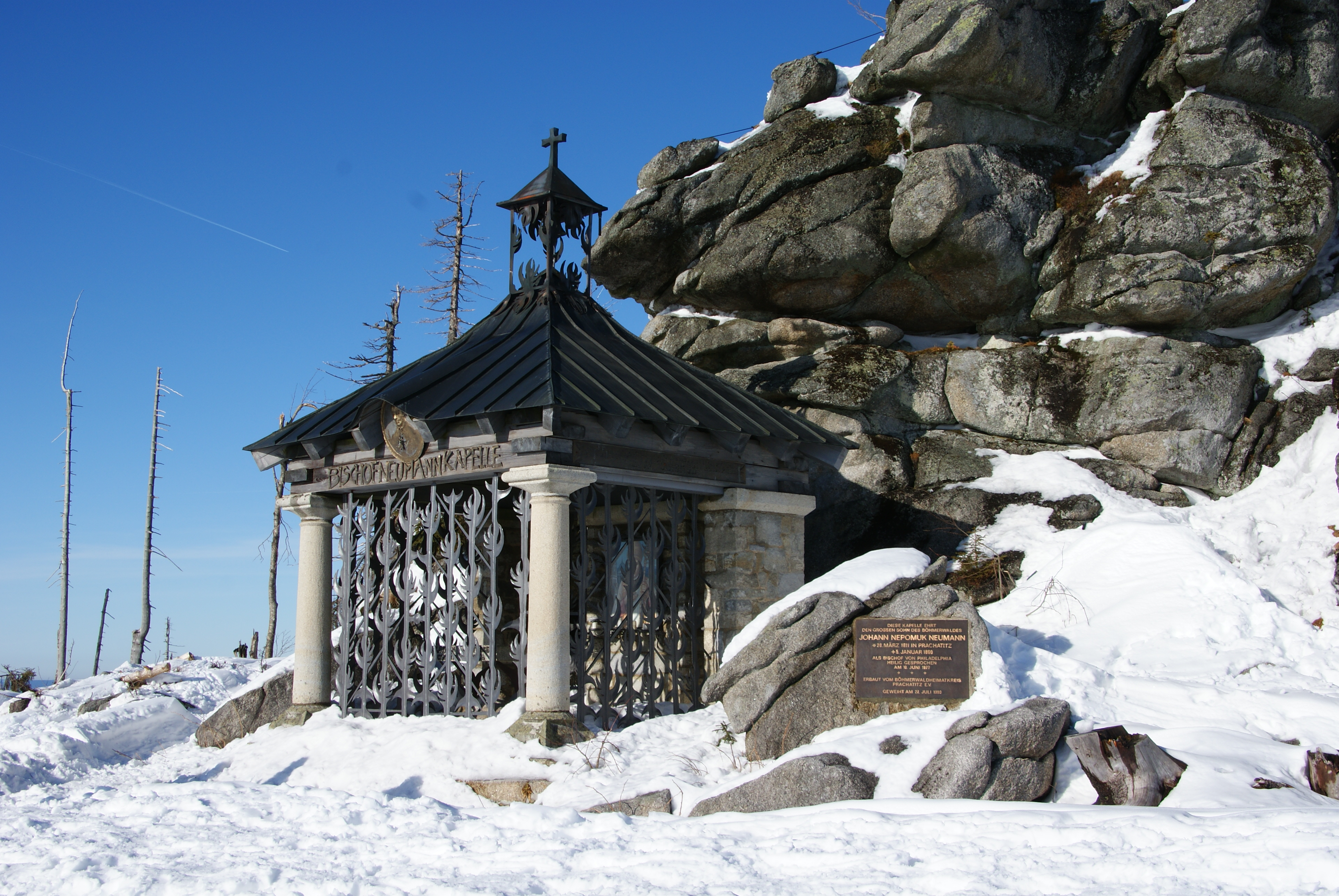
Bishop Neumann Chapel

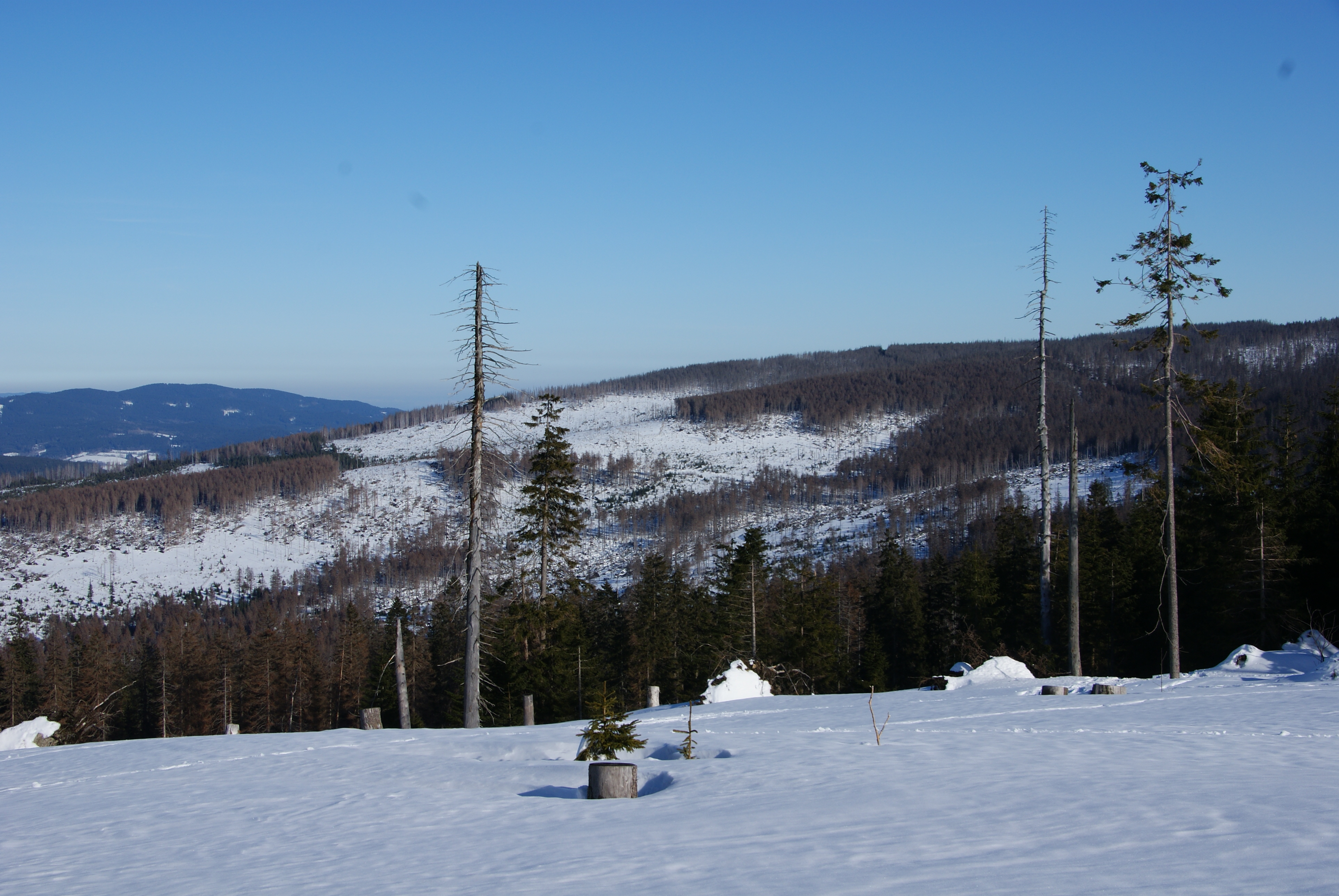
View looking southeast at the bark-beetle damaged woodland

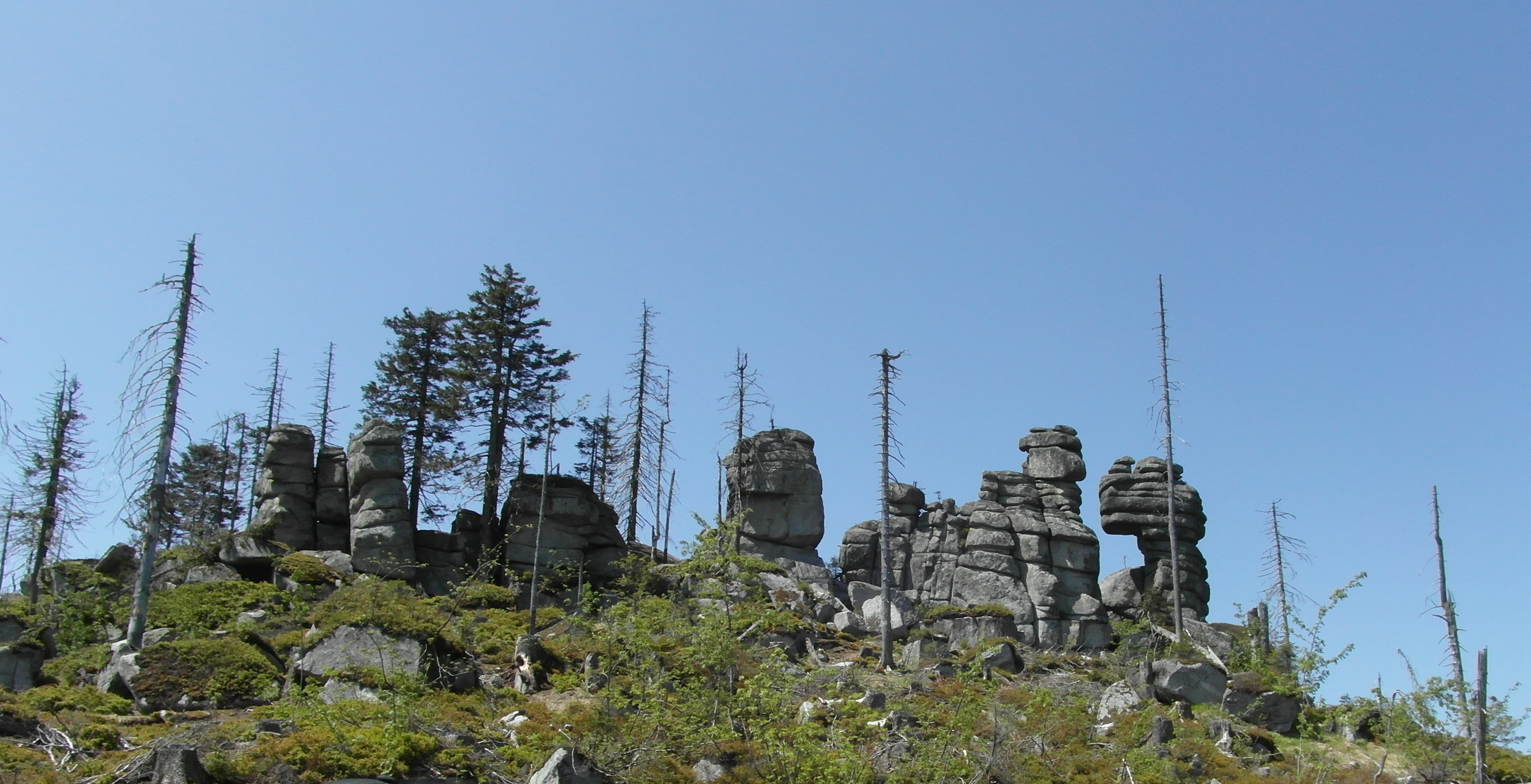
Rock formations on the Dreisesselberg

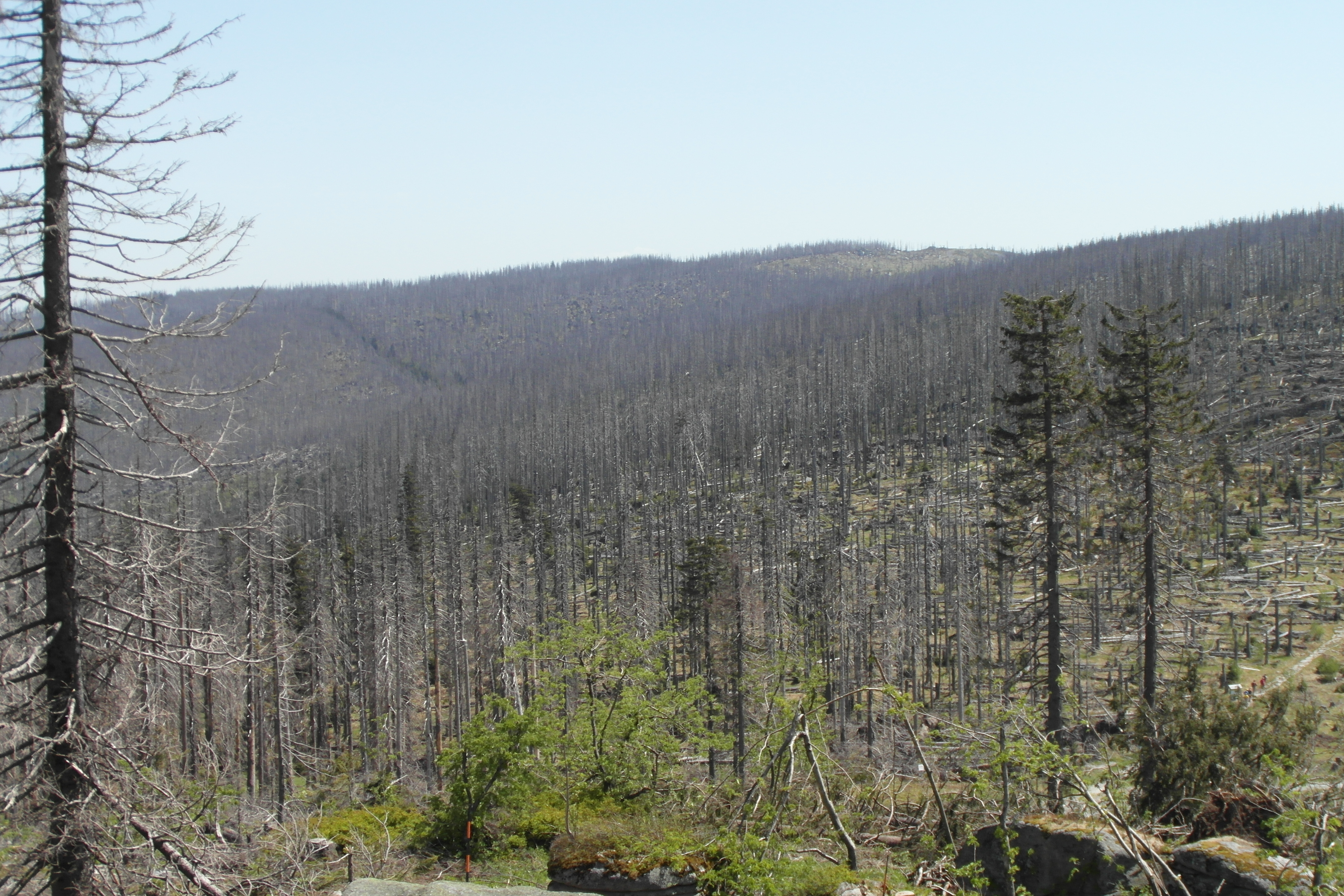
View of the Czech side of the Dreisesselberg

== Literature ==
- Paul Praxl: Der Dreiländerberg: Grenzland Bayern-Böhmen-Österreich. Morsak, Grafenau, 1991, ISBN 978-3-87553-110-7
