= Nová Pec =

- Municipality
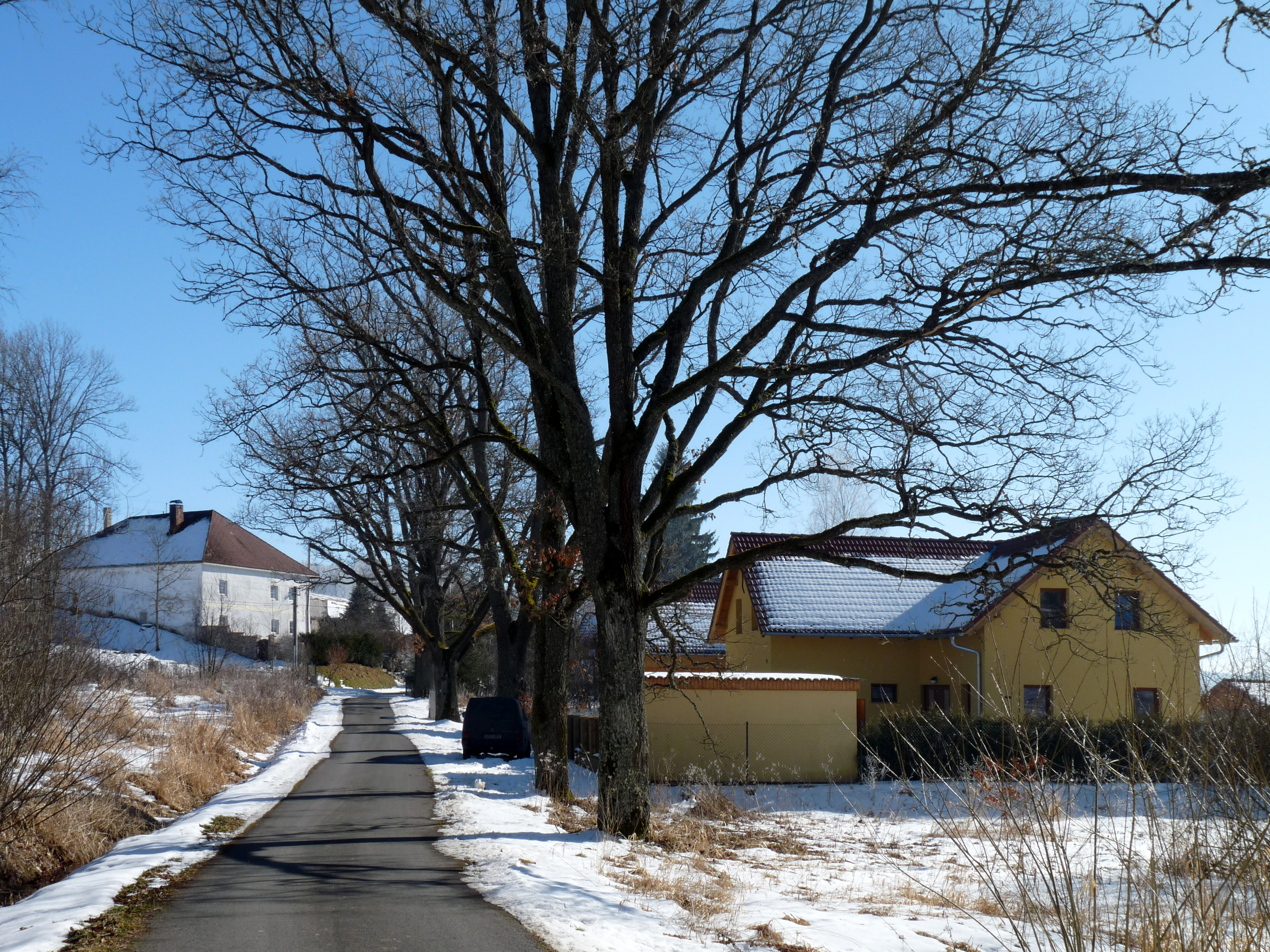
- Bělá, a part of Nová Pec

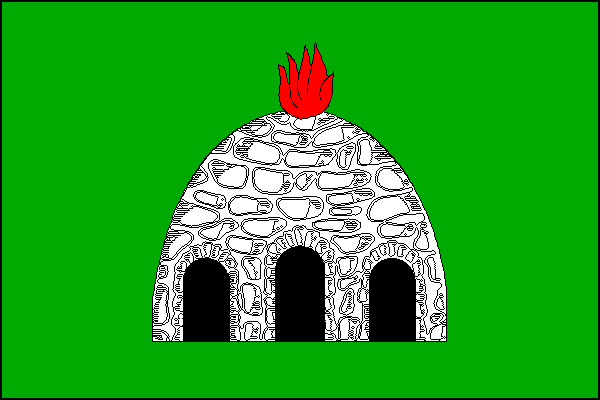
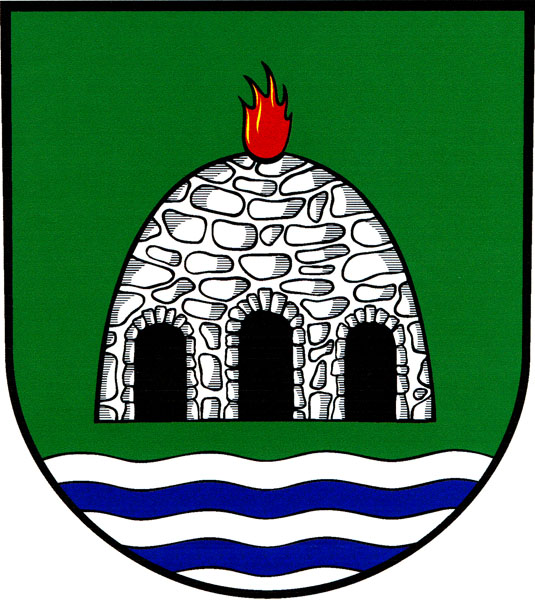
- Flag Coat of arms

- Location in the Czech Republic
- Coordinates: 48°46′33″N 13°55′38″E
- Country: Czech Republic
- Region: South Bohemian
- District: Prachatice
- First mentioned: 1653

Area
  - Total: 66.38 km^{2} (25.63 sq mi)
- Elevation: 737 m (2,418 ft)

Population (2026-01-01)
  - Total: 432
  - Density: 6.51/km^{2} (16.9/sq mi)
- Time zone: UTC+1 (CET)
  - Summer (DST): UTC+2 (CEST)
- Postal codes: 384 51, 384 62
- Website: www.novapec.eu

Nová Pec (German: Neuofen) is a municipality and village in Prachatice District in the South Bohemian Region of the Czech Republic. It has about 400 inhabitants.

== Administrative division ==
Nová Pec consists of seven municipal parts (in brackets population according to the 2021 census):

- Nová Pec (5)
- Bělá (14)
- Dlouhý Bor (25)
- Jelení (17)
- Láz (73)
- Nové Chalupy (233)
- Pěkná (40)

Pěkná forms an exclave of the municipal territory.

== Etymology ==
The name means 'new furnace' in Czech. A pitch furnace was built here before the village was founded.

== Geography ==
Nová Pec is located about 29 kilometres (18 mi) south of Prachatice and 48 km (30 mi) southwest of České Budějovice. The tripoint of the Czech Republic, Germany and Austria is situated on the municipal border.

Nová Pec lies in the Bohemian Forest mountain range. The summit of Plechý, which is at 1,378 metres (4,521 ft) the highest mountain of the Czech and Austrian parts of the mountain range, is located on the Czech–Austrian border. Most of the built-up area is located in the eastern part of the municipality, on the banks of the Vltava River. The confluence of the Teplá Vltava and Studená Vltava rivers, which form the Vltava, is located in the territory of the Pěkná exclave.

== History ==
The village was founded in the mid-17th century. The first written mention of Nová Pec is from 1653, when there were two inhabitants registered. It was owned by the Eggenberg family, who acquired this area from Emperor Rudolf II in 1622. After the last member of the family died, Nová Pec was inherited by the Schwarzenberg family in 1719.

== Demographics ==
Historical population

Year	Pop.	±%
1869	1,800	—
1880	2,050	+13.9%
1890	2,104	+2.6%
1900	2,198	+4.5%
1910	2,303	+4.8%

Year	Pop.	±%
1921	2,314	+0.5%
1930	2,514	+8.6%
1950	651	−74.1%
1961	724	+11.2%
1970	827	+14.2%

Year	Pop.	±%
1980	726	−12.2%
1991	640	−11.8%
2001	632	−1.2%
2011	470	−25.6%
2021	407	−13.4%

Source: Censuses

== Transport ==
Nová Pec is located on the railway line České Budějovice–Stožec.

== Sights ==
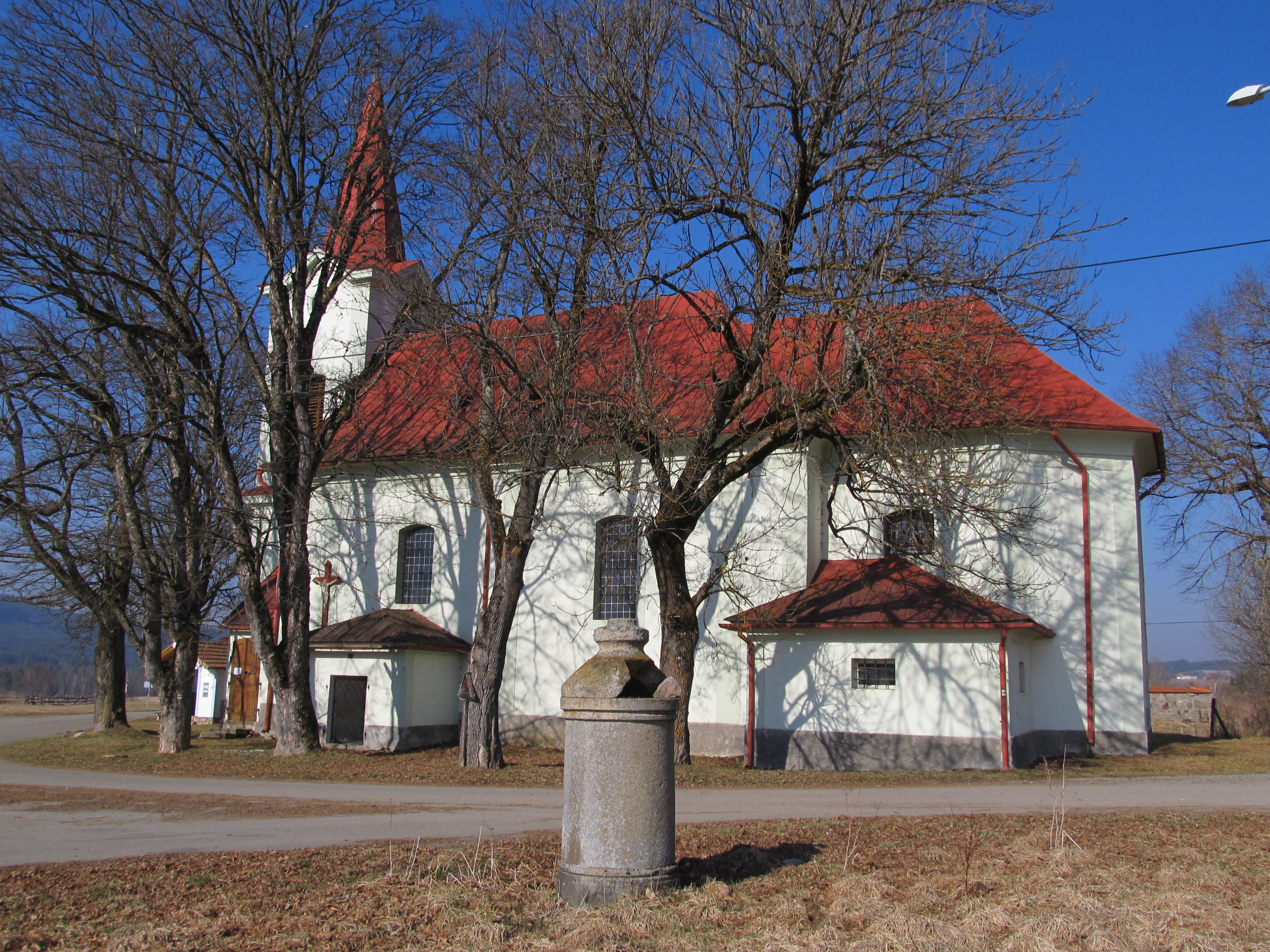
Church of Saint Anne

The main landmark is the Church of Saint Anne in Pěkná. It was built in the Neoclassical style in 1788–1791. The tower was finished in 1903.
