= Studená Vltava =

River in the Czech Republic and Germany

Studená Vltava Kalte Moldau
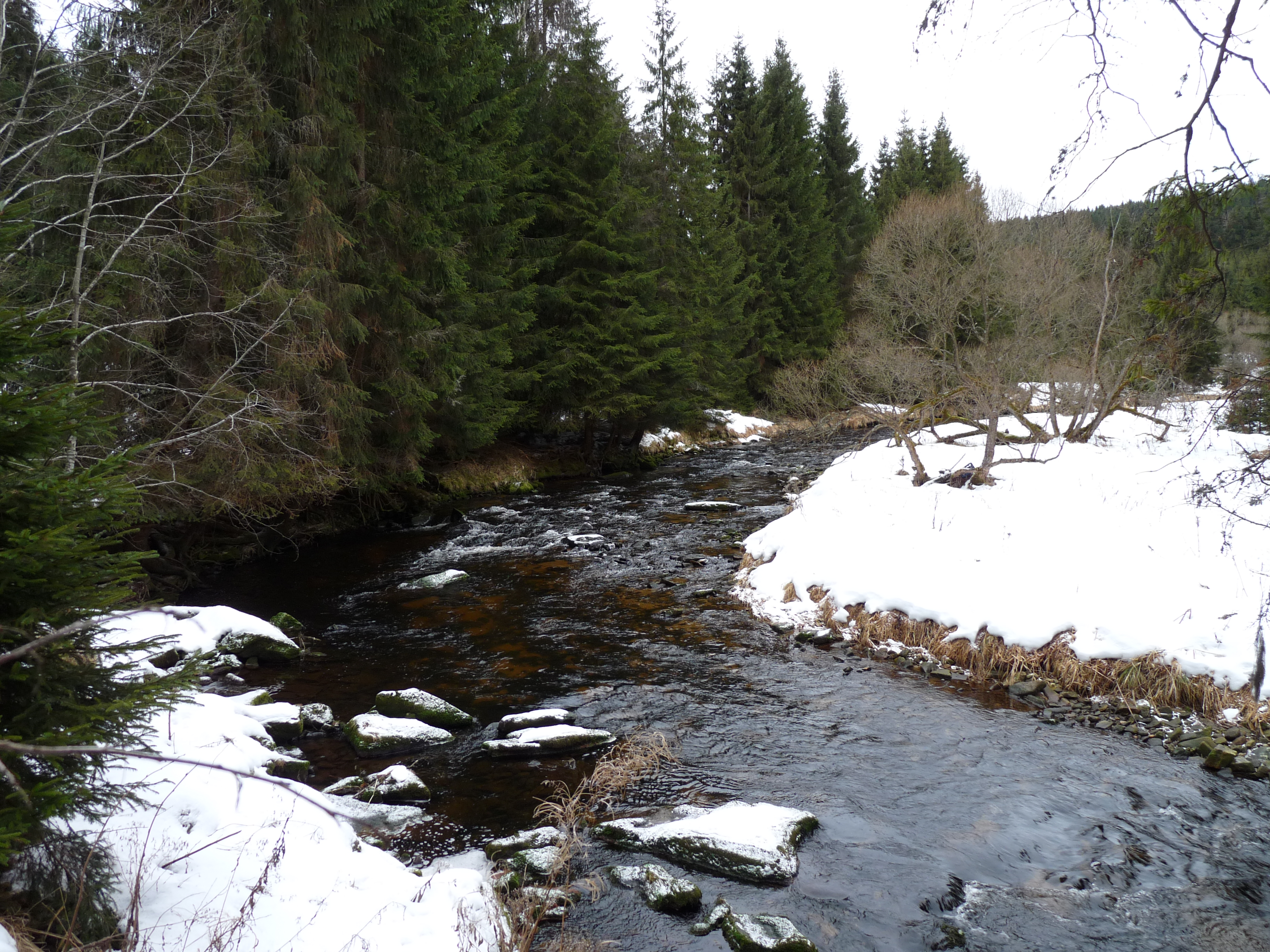
- The Studená Vltava near Stožec

Location
- Countries: Czech Republic; Germany
- Regions/ States: South Bohemian; Bavaria

Physical characteristics
- Source
  - location: Haidmühle, Bavarian Forest
  - coordinates: 48°50′27″N 13°43′26″E
  - elevation: 961 m (3,153 ft)
- Mouth
  - location: Vltava
  - coordinates: 48°51′33″N 13°53′35″E
  - elevation: 731 m (2,398 ft)
- Length: 24.7 km (15.3 mi)
- Basin size: 121.0 km^{2} (46.7 sq mi)
- Discharge
  - average: 2.04 m^{3}/s (72 cu ft/s) near estuary

Basin features
- Progression: Vltava→ Elbe→ North Sea

The Studená Vltava (German: Kalte Moldau) is a river in the Czech Republic and Germany, the secondary source river of the Vltava River. It flows through Bavaria in Germany and through the South Bohemian Region. It is 24.7 km (15.3 mi) long.

== Etymology ==
The name Vltava is derived from the Proto-Germanic words wilt-ahwa ('wild water'). The attribute studená means 'cold', compared to the Teplá Vltava, i.e. 'warm Vltava'.

== Characteristic ==
The Studená Vltava is formed by the gradual confluence of several creek with their own names, but the main source called Weberaubach is taken as an integral part of the Studená Vltava. The Studená Vltava originates in the territory of Haidmühle in the Bavarian Forest at an elevation of 961 m (3,153 ft) and flows to the Pěkná exclave of the Nová Pec municipality, where it merges with the Teplá Vltava River at an elevation of 731 m (2,398 ft) and continues as Vltava. It is 24.7 km (15.3 mi) long, of which 7.7 km (4.8 mi) is in Germany, 2.0 km (1.2 mi) forms the Czech–German state border and 15.0 km (9.3 mi) is in the Czech Republic. Its drainage basin has an area of 121.0 km^{2} (46.7 sq mi), of which 74.5 km^{2} (28.8 sq mi) is in the Czech Republic.

The longest tributaries of the Studená Vltava are:

Tributary	Length (km)	Side
Světlá	10.0	right
Hučina	6.5	right

== Course ==
The river flows through the municipal territories of Haidmühle in Germany and Stožec and Nová Pec in the Czech Republic.

== Nature ==
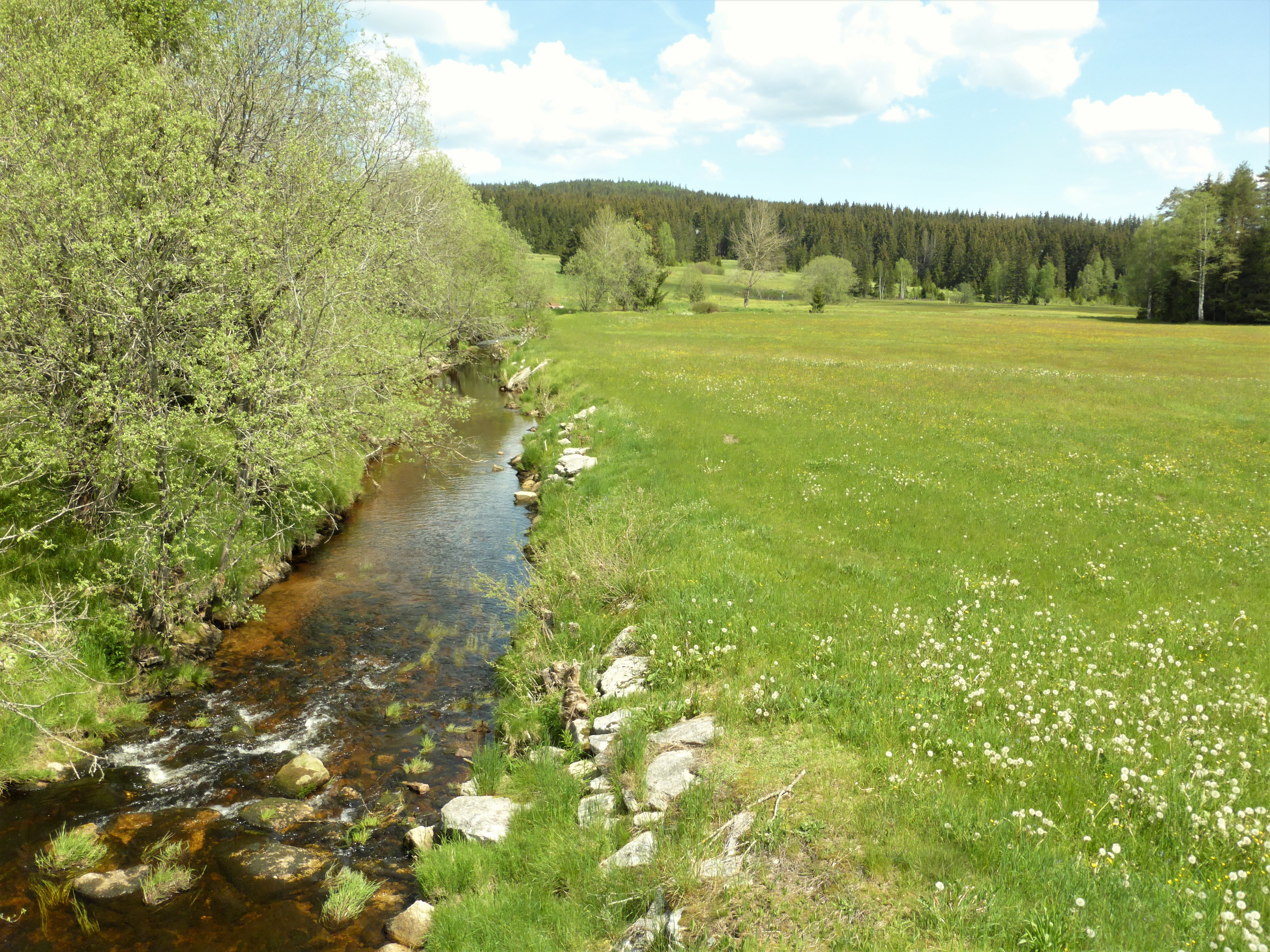
The Studená Vltava in Germany

The Czech part of the river is located within the Šumava National Park. Among the common species of fish in the Studená Vltava are river trout, rainbow trout, grayling, brook trout, European chub, common dace and European bullhead. Several other species are occasionally found, such as northern pike, European eel, zander and European perch.

River-bound birds include common kingfisher, white-throated dipper and grey heron. The river is also home to the protected species of freshwater pearl mussel and brook lamprey.

== See also ==
- List of rivers of the Czech Republic
- List of rivers of Bavaria
