= Plöckenstein =

Plöckenstein / Plechý
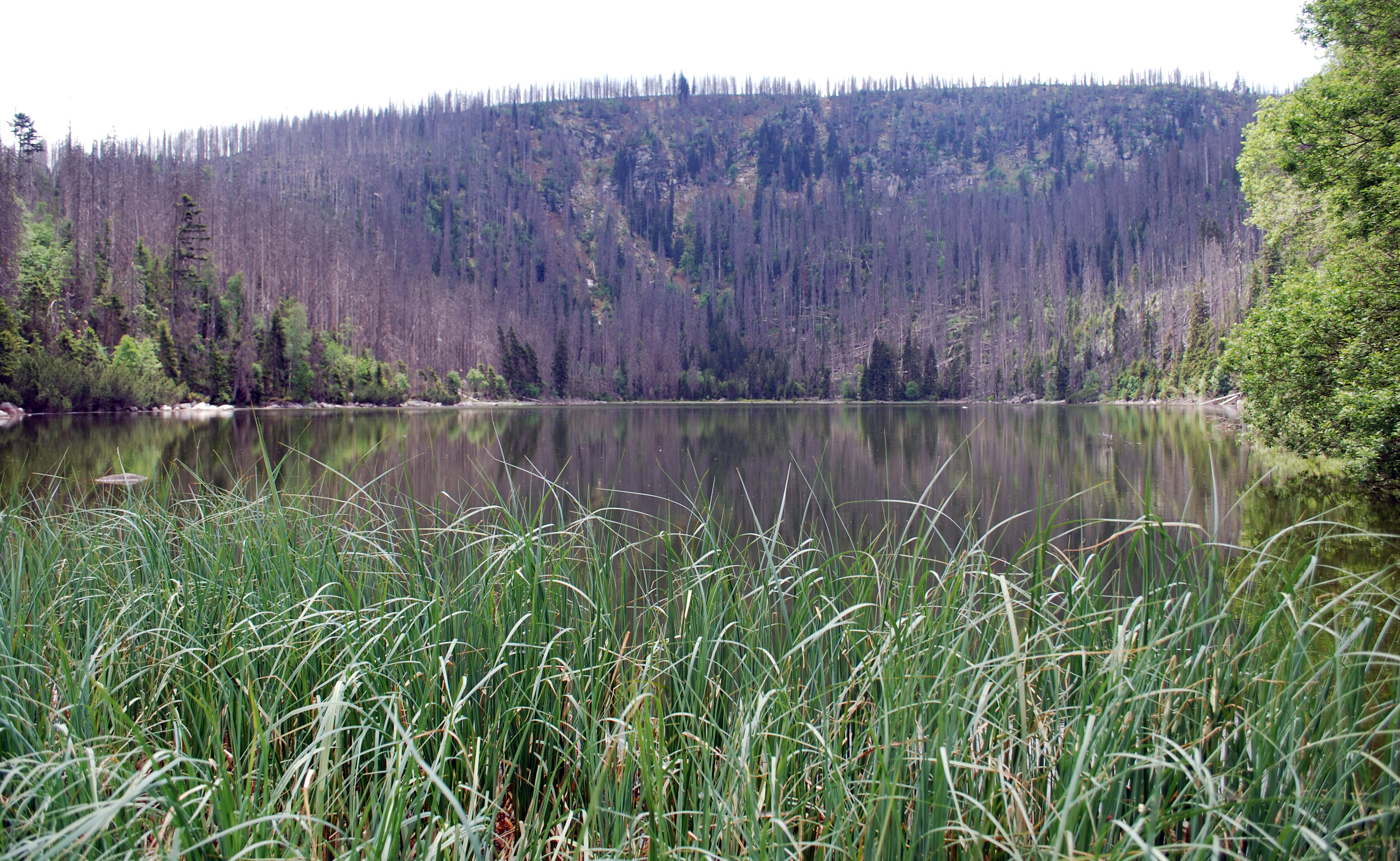
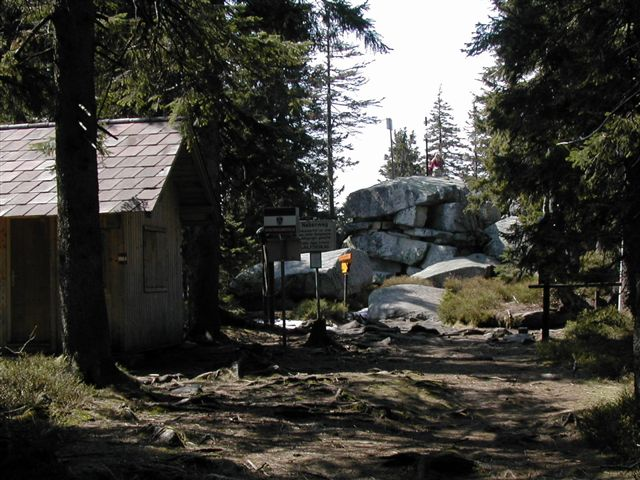
- View of the summit from the Plöckensteinsee to the north) Austro-Czech border on the summit rock of the Plöckenstein

Highest point
- Elevation: 1,379 m (AA) (4,524 ft) (1,378.3 m n.m.)
- Prominence: 1,379-868 m ↓ Frauenberg
- Isolation: 42.2 km → Großer Rachel
- Coordinates: 48°46′16″N 13°51′26″E

Geography
- Location within Czech Republic
- Location: Upper Austria, Austria and South Bohemian Region, Czech Republic
- Parent range: Bohemian Forest

Geology
- Rock type: Eisgarner Granite

The Plöckenstein (Czech: Plechý) is a mountain, 1,379 m (AA) high, in the Bohemian Forest on the Austro-Czech border. Its summit is the highest point in the Bohemian Forest in both countries, and also the highest point in the regions of Mühlviertel and South Bohemia. It is well known as a result of stories by Adalbert Stifter.

== Location ==
The Plöckenstein lies between the Austrian village of Schwarzenberg to the south and the Czech village of Nová Pec to the NE. Northeast of, and below the summit on Czech soil, is the lake of Plöckensteiner See, the southernmost of eight glacial lakes in the Bohemian Forest; the northern mountainside is the core zone of the Bohemian Forest National Park (Šumava National Park). The Jezerní potok (Seebach) stream rises on the mountain. About 7 km northeast, in the Czech Republic, is the western end of the Lipno Reservoir.

== Tripoint and extreme point ==
The Plöckenstein lies about 1.3 km east of the tripoint between Germany, Austria and the Czech Republic. The tripoint is roughly east of the Bavarian Plöckenstein (1,365 m above sea level (NHN)). The area of the tripoint is also called Dreiecksmark (Trojmezí, "tripoint") and links the two Plöckensteins over a saddle (1,321 m above NHN).

West of the Plöckenstein is Upper Austria's northernmost point and Bavaria's easternmost point, which was also the easternmost point of the former West Germany prior to the reunification.

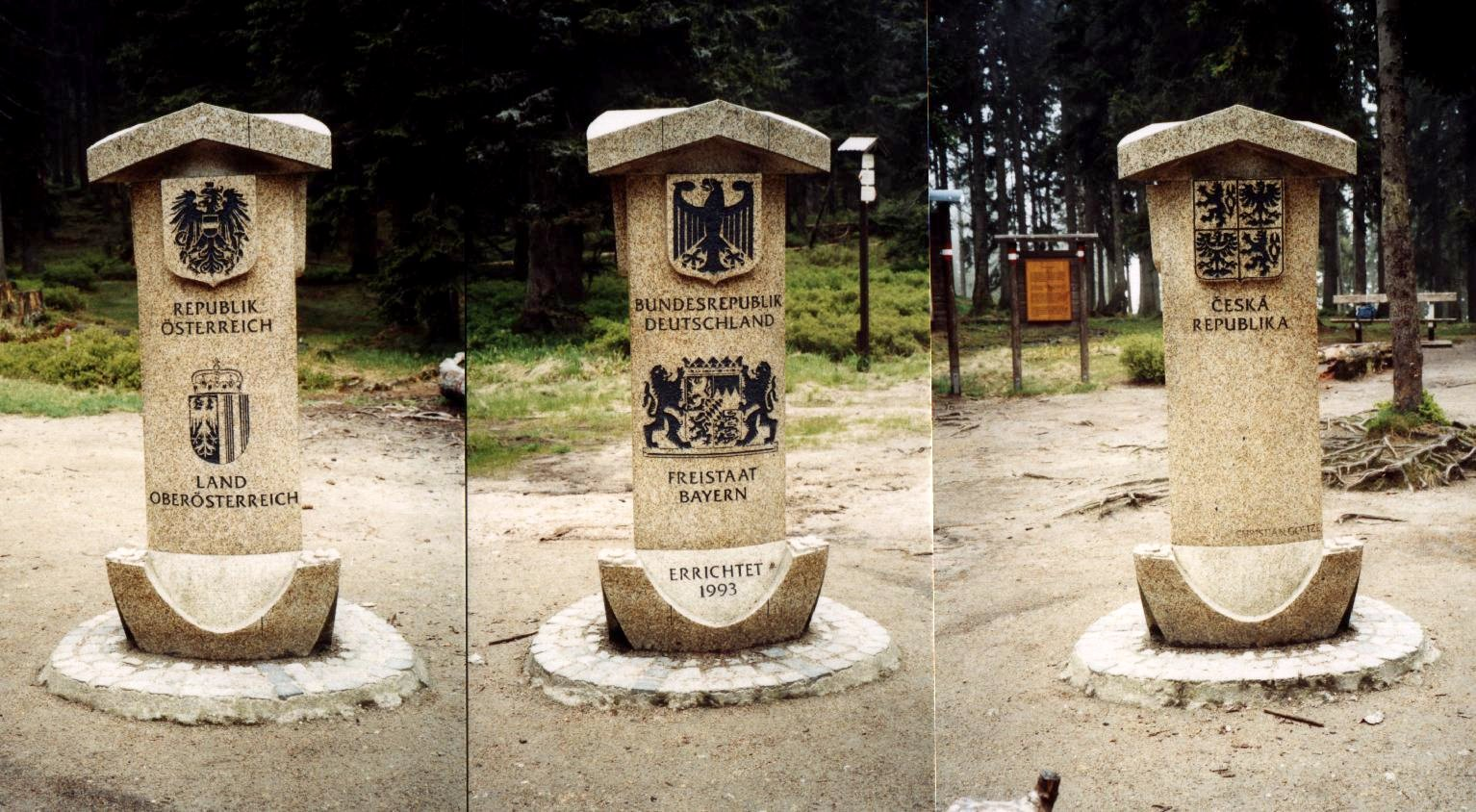
The tripoint

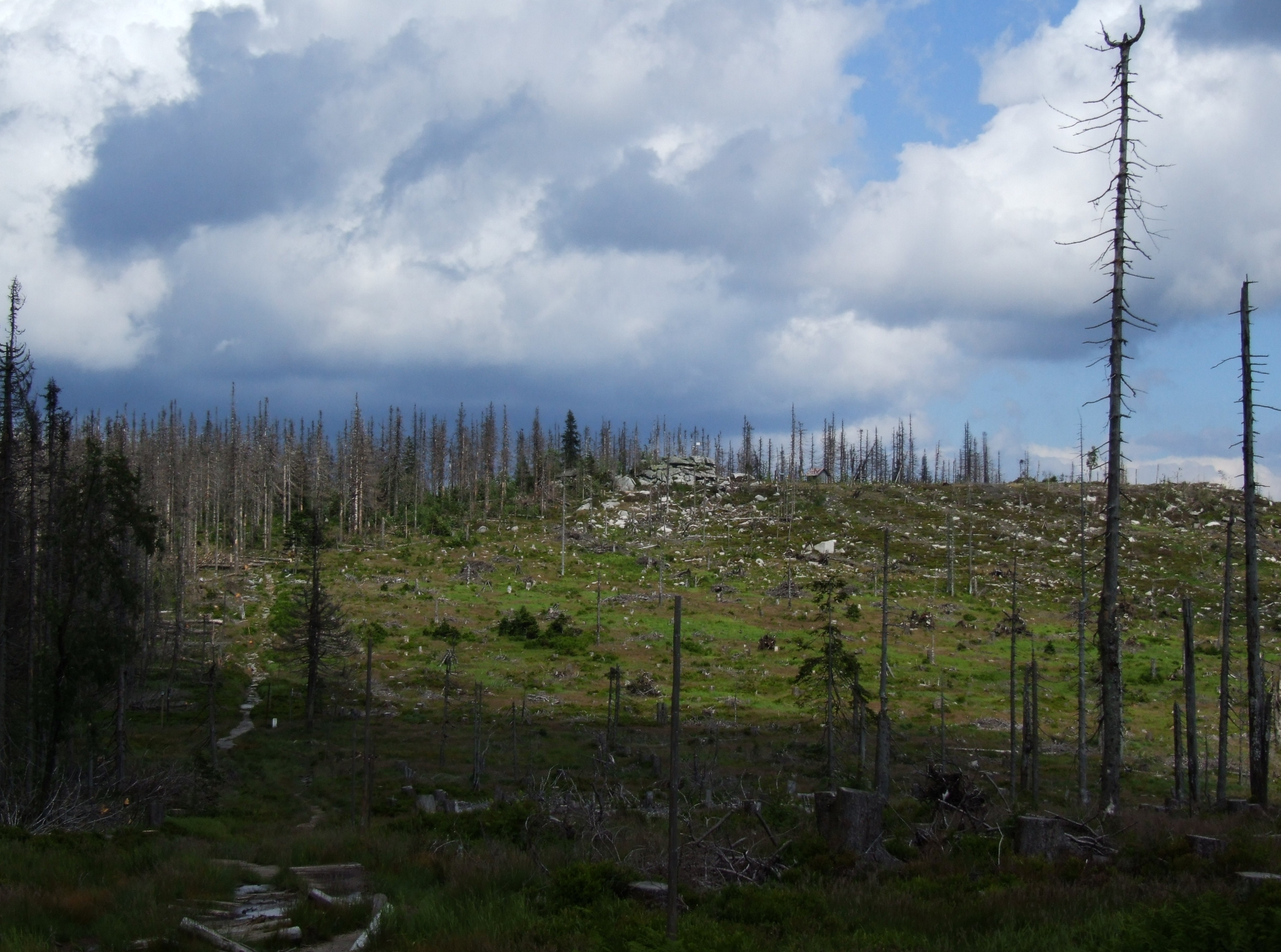
The Plöckenstein in June 2011

== Sights ==
During the Cold War the border area of the Bohemian Forest was inaccessible to citizens of the Eastern Bloc because the Iron Curtain ran through it. The new government under Marián Čalfa, which came to power on 10 December 1989, dismantled the border fortifications in December 1989 (see also the Velvet Revolution).

Among the sights and attractions in the area of the Plöckenstein are the following (in alphabetical order):

- Adalbert-Stifter Monument (1,311 m n.m.; Czech Republic) – on a rocky crag above the Plöckensteinsee a 14.5-metre-high obelisk in memory of Adalbert Stifter ("Poet of the Bohemian Forest") was built in 1876–1877.
- Dreisesselberg (1,333 m above NHN; Germany) – from the pillow-like, weathered granite rocks of this mountain there are views on clear days as far as the Alps.
- Plöckensteinsee (1,090 m n.m.; Czech Republic) – this roughly 7.48 hectare mountain lake lies below the Plöckenstein.
- Schwarzenbergscher Schwemmkanal (Austria-Czech Republic) – this is an artificial canal that crosses the watershed between the Moldau and Danube.
- Lipno Reservoir (also Moldau Reservoir; 725.6 m n.m.; Czech Republic) – the reservoir is c. 48 km long, is 48.7 km^{2} in area and has a capacity of 309.5 M. m^{3}.
- Steinernes Meer on the Bavarian Plöckenstein (1,365 m above NHN; Germany) – rock landscape on the southern flank of the mountain
- Teufelsschüssel (1,108 m above sea level (AA); Austria) – granite block formation roughly east of the border
