= Jeanette Schmid =

- Jeanette

Background information
- Also known as: Baroness Lips von Lipstrill
- Born: Rudolf Schmid; 6 November 1924; Volary, Czechoslovakia
- Died: 9 March 2005 (aged 80) Vienna, Austria
- Genre: whistling
- Occupation: whistler
- Instrument: Voice
- Years active: 1945–2005

Jeanette Schmid (6 November 1924 – 9 March 2005) was a professional whistler and transgender woman.

== Life ==
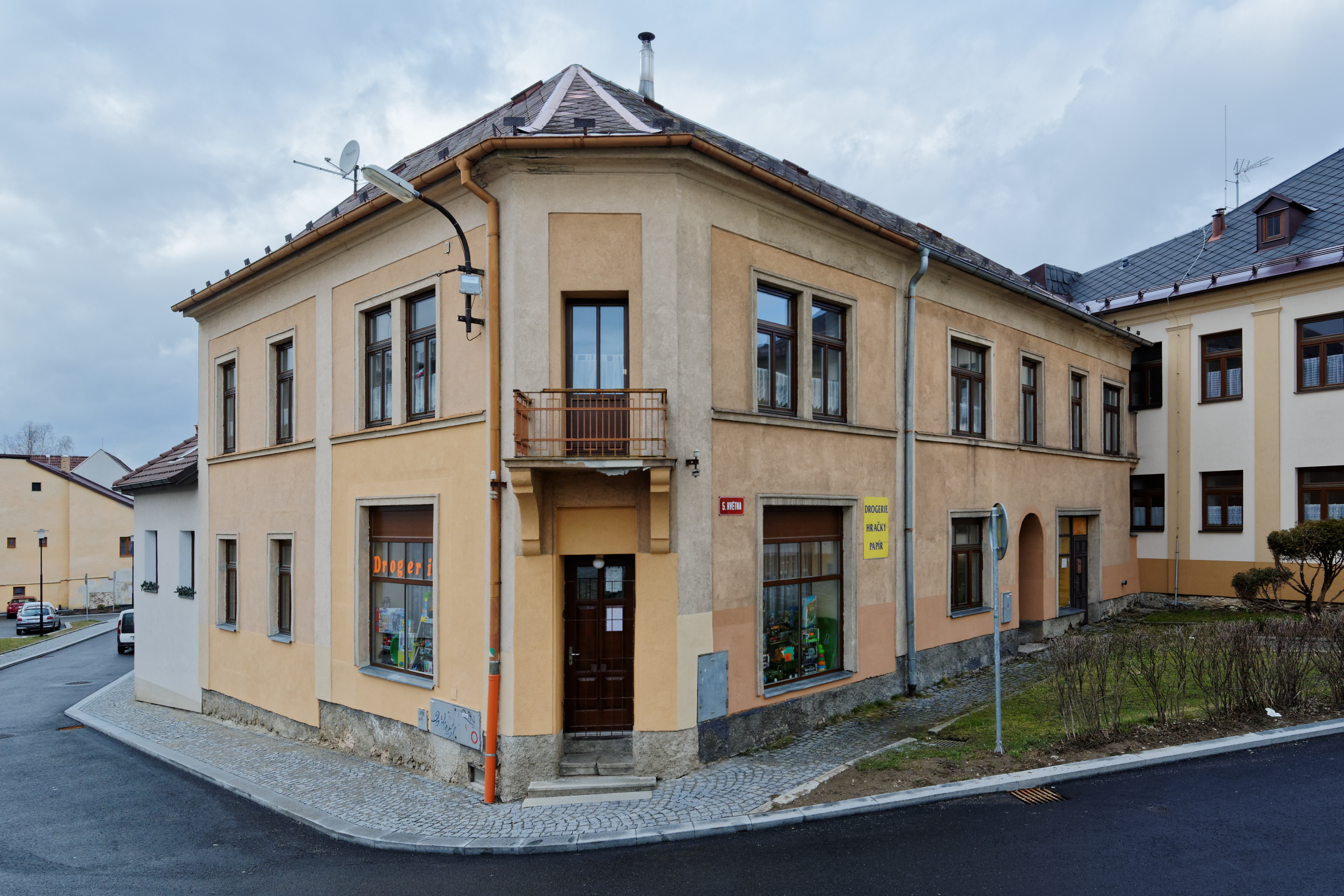
Birthplace of Rudolf/Jeanette Schmid

Born Rudolf Schmid in a German family in Volary, Czechoslovakia, Schmid began to dress in feminine clothing at a young age and loved singing and dancing. Schmid did not fit in with the Nazi ideal of the Aryan male but enlisted in the Wehrmacht in 1941 and was posted to Udine, Italy until sent home due to typhoid fever.

At the end of the war, Schmid fled to Munich where she began a career as a female impersonator. She rapidly gained fame for her talent, bawdy material, and slinky outfits. The Shah of Iran, Mohammad Reza Pahlavi, and his wife Queen Soraya, saw Schmid perform in Hamburg and invited her to Tehran, but Schmid's material and dress were considered inappropriate by many in Iran, and she was forced to devise a new routine. She instead whistled a Strauss polka and Offenbach's "Barcarole" for the Shah and his court.

Following her Iran performance, Schmid toured the world as a cross-dressing whistler, performing on stage with acts like Frank Sinatra, Édith Piaf and Marlene Dietrich while living in Cairo. In 1964, Schmid underwent sex reassignment surgery conducted by Ludwig Levy-Lenz and changed her name to Jeanette. Schmid moved to Vienna to continue her whistling career.

Schmid continued to tour the world under the stage name Baroness Lips von Lipstrill, including a successful stint on Broadway. She was awarded the Austrian Decoration of Merit in Gold in 2004.

Schmid died in Vienna in 2005.
