= Kvilda =

- Municipality
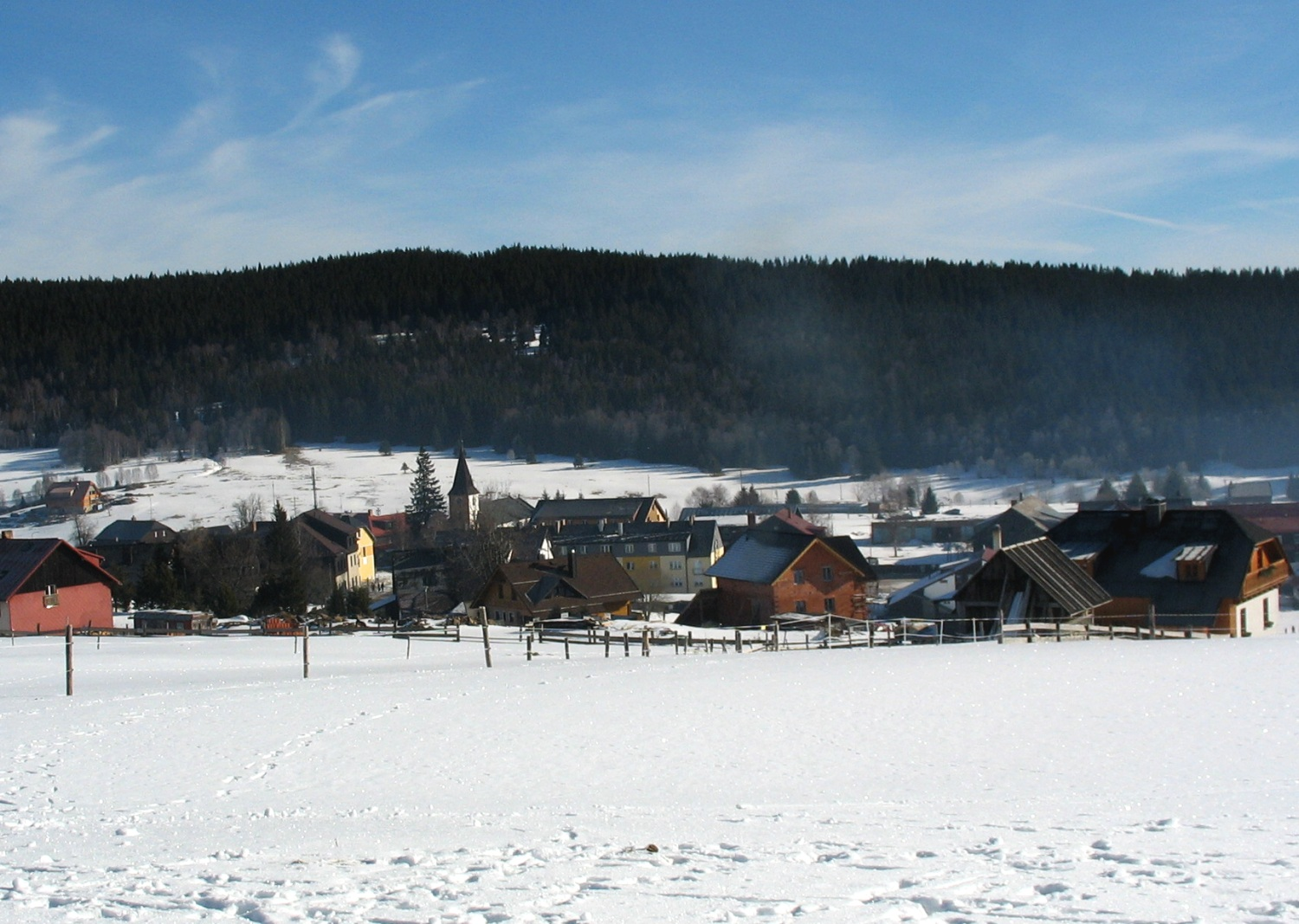
- General view

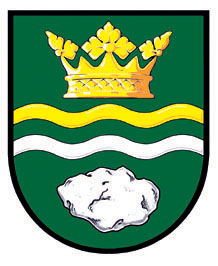
- Flag Coat of arms

- Location in the Czech Republic
- Coordinates: 49°1′10″N 13°34′47″E
- Country: Czech Republic
- Region: South Bohemian
- District: Prachatice
- First mentioned: 1569

Area
  - Total: 45.19 km^{2} (17.45 sq mi)
- Elevation: 1,065 m (3,494 ft)

Population (2026-01-01)
  - Total: 116
  - Density: 2.57/km^{2} (6.65/sq mi)
- Time zone: UTC+1 (CET)
  - Summer (DST): UTC+2 (CEST)
- Postal code: 384 93
- Website: www.sumava.net/kvilda/

Kvilda (German: Außergefild) is a municipality and village in Prachatice District in the South Bohemian Region of the Czech Republic. It has about 100 inhabitants. At an altitude of 1,065 metres (3,494 ft), it is the highest municipality in the Czech Republic. It is also one of the coldest places in the country.

== Administrative division ==
Kvilda consists of five municipal parts (in brackets population according to the 2021 census):

- Kvilda (126)
- Bučina (0)
- Františkov (1)
- Hraběcí Huť (0)
- Vydří Most (3)

== Etymology ==
The name Kvilda is derived from the Middle High German word gevilde, meaning 'plain' or 'wide meadow'.

== Geography ==
Kvilda is located about 30 kilometres (19 mi) west of Prachatice and 64 km (40 mi) west of České Budějovice. It lies in the Bohemian Forest and in the Šumava National Park. The village of Kvilda lies at an average altitude of 1,065 metres (3,494 ft) above sea level, which makes it the highest municipality in the country. The highest point in the municipality is the Černá hora mountain at 1,316 m (4,318 ft).

The Teplá Vltava (the headwater of the Vltava, which is the longest Czech river) originates in the municipality. The municipal territory is rich in small watercourses. In the northern part of the municipality is the 103 ha (250-acre) large moor of Jezerní slať.

=== Climate ===
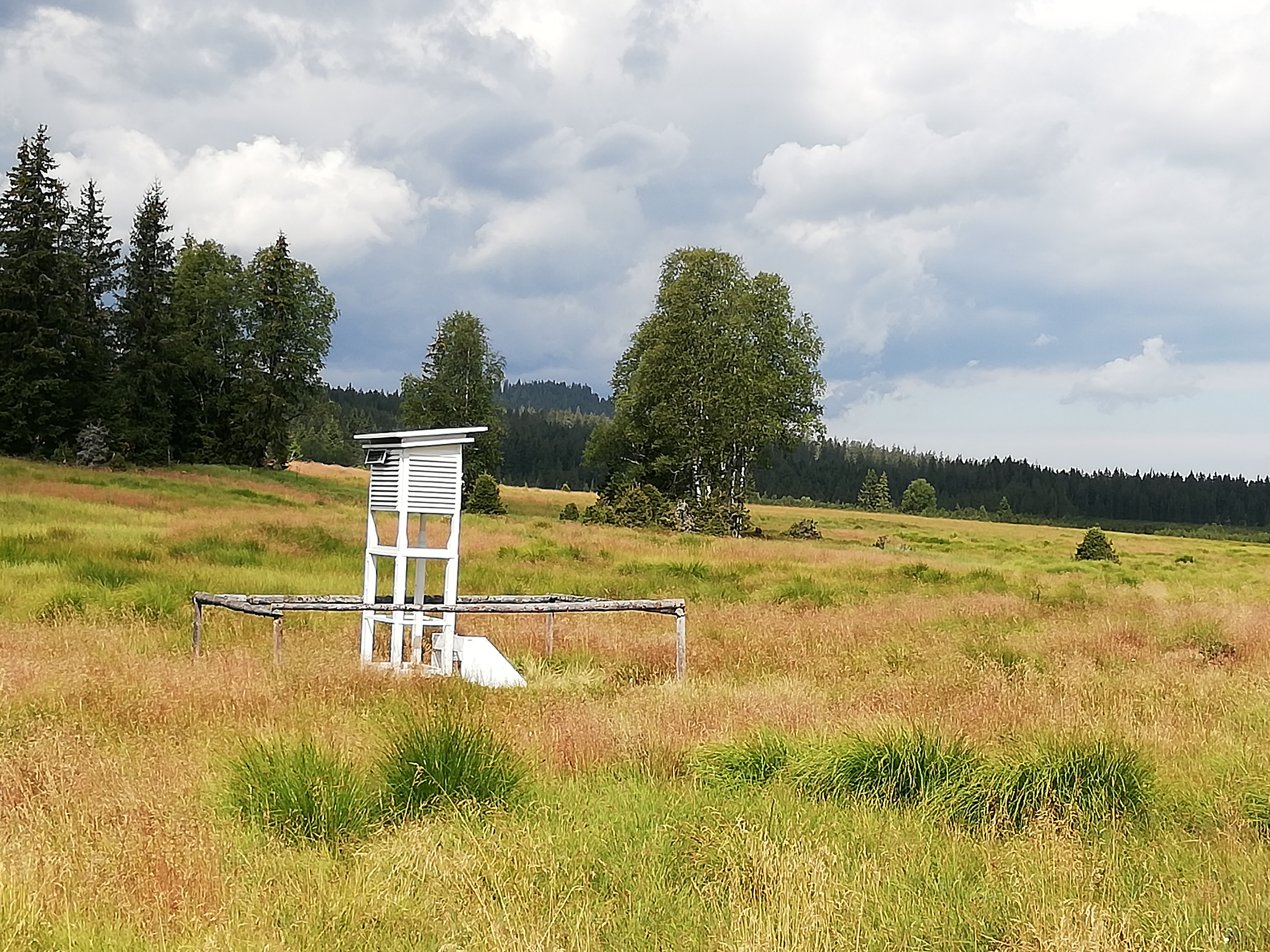
Perla weather station in Jezerní slať

Kvilda enjoys a version of wet Subarctic climate (Dfc) with cold and wet conditions year round. The municipality, specifically the moor Jezerní slať and its weather station named Perla, holds several temperature records. It is one of the coldest places in the country with average annual temperature of 2 °C (36 °F). The lowest measured temperature is −41.6 °C (−42.9 °F) recorded on 30 January 1987. It also holds the record of the highest average of below-zero days per annum, which is 252 days. The total annual amount of precipitation is up to 1,300 mm. The station Perla has been in operation since October 1985.

The average annual temperature in the village of Kvilda is 3.4 °C (38.1 °F), The total annual amount of precipitation is 1,100 mm. The coldest month is January with an average temperature of −5 °C (23 °F), the warmest month is July with 12.3 °C (54.1 °F). The average number of days with snow cover is 150.

== History ==
The first written mention of Kvilda is from 1569. Most of the population were ethnic Germans. After World War II, the German inhabitants were expelled.

== Demographics ==
Historical population

Year	Pop.	±%
1869	1,436	—
1880	1,768	+23.1%
1890	1,558	−11.9%
1900	1,643	+5.5%
1910	1,493	−9.1%

Year	Pop.	±%
1921	1,426	−4.5%
1930	1,475	+3.4%
1950	204	−86.2%
1961	227	+11.3%
1970	226	−0.4%

Year	Pop.	±%
1980	205	−9.3%
1991	169	−17.6%
2001	169	+0.0%
2011	163	−3.6%
2021	130	−20.2%

Source: Censuses

== Transport ==
There are no railways or major roads passing through the municipality.

== Sights ==
The Church of Saint Stephan was built in 1892–1894 and replaced an old wooden church destroyed by fire.

On the edge of Jezerní slať is a lookout tower and an educational trail.
