= Volary =

- Town
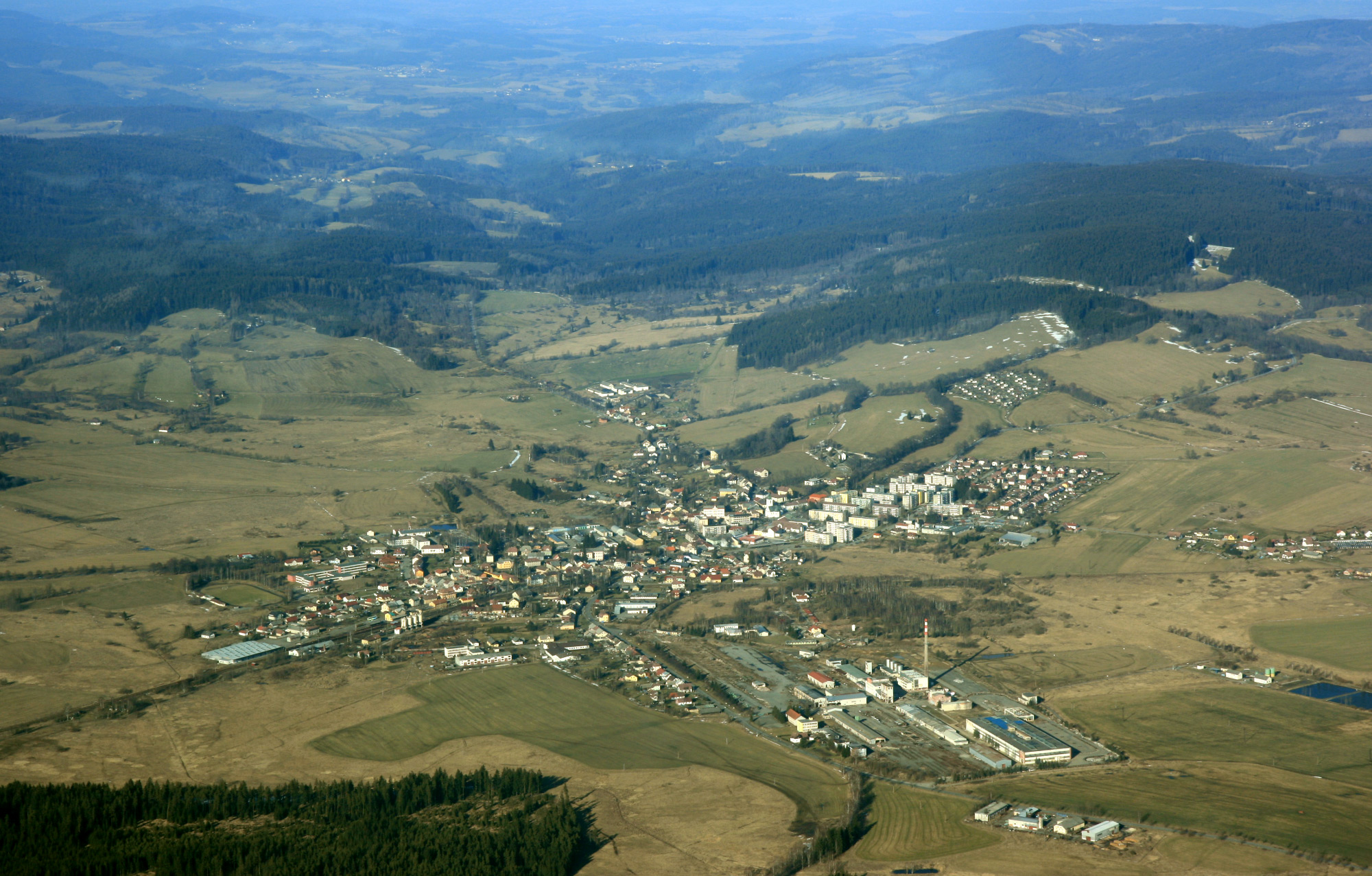
- Aerial view

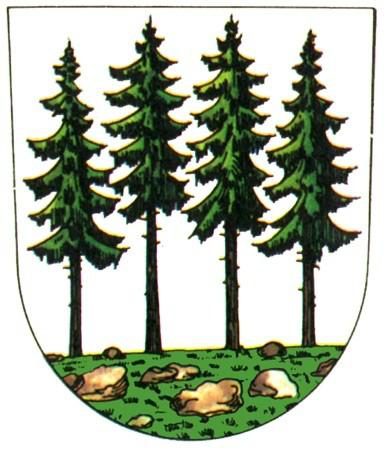
- Flag Coat of arms

- Location in the Czech Republic
- Coordinates: 48°54′35″N 13°53′22″E
- Country: Czech Republic
- Region: South Bohemian
- District: Prachatice
- First mentioned: 1359

Government
  - Mayor: Martina Pospíšilová

Area
  - Total: 107.51 km^{2} (41.51 sq mi)
- Elevation: 760 m (2,490 ft)

Population (2026-01-01)
  - Total: 3,657
  - Density: 34.02/km^{2} (88.10/sq mi)
- Time zone: UTC+1 (CET)
  - Summer (DST): UTC+2 (CEST)
- Postal code: 384 51
- Website: www.mestovolary.cz

Volary (Czech pronunciation: [ˈvolarɪ]; German: Wallern) is a town in Prachatice District in the South Bohemian Region of the Czech Republic. It has about 3,700 inhabitants. The town proper is located in the Bohemian Forest mountain range.

The main landmark of Volary is the Church of Saint Catherine. An area in the northern part of the town with timber-framed Alpine-type buildings is well preserved and is protected as a village monument reservation.

== Administrative division ==
Volary consists of three municipal parts (in brackets population according to the 2021 census):

- Volary (3,578)
- Chlum (20)
- Mlynářovice (54)

== Etymology ==
The origin of the name is uncertain. The name is possibly derived from the Czech word volař, denoting an ox trader or a farmer who raises oxen instead of horses, or from the Middle High German word wallaere ('wanderer').

== Geography ==
Volary is located about 14 kilometres (9 mi) southwest of Prachatice and 43 km (27 mi) west of České Budějovice. It lies mostly in the Bohemian Forest mountain range, only the northeastern part of Volary extends into the Bohemian Forest Foothills. The highest mountain in the municipal territory is Bobík at 1,266 m (4,154 ft) above sea level, located north of the town. Other high mountains in the territory include Jedlová at 1,089 m (3,573 ft), Křemenná at 1,085 m (3,560 ft), Doupná hora at 1,052 m (3,451 ft), Větrný at 1,051 m (3,448 ft), Mechový vrch at 1,012 m (3,320 ft) and Na Skále at 1,011 m (3,317 ft).

The town is crossed by the stream Volarský potok. It flows into the Teplá Vltava, which runs along the southwestern border of the territory. The Blanice River flows along the eastern municipal border.

== History ==
The first mention of Volary is from 1359, when the Prachatice councillor Ondřej from Volary (in Latin Andreas de Wallerii) was listed. The foundation of Volary was connected with the overall colonisation of Bohemian Forest in the 13th and 14th centuries. The inhabitants were predominantly ethnic Germans from Bavaria.

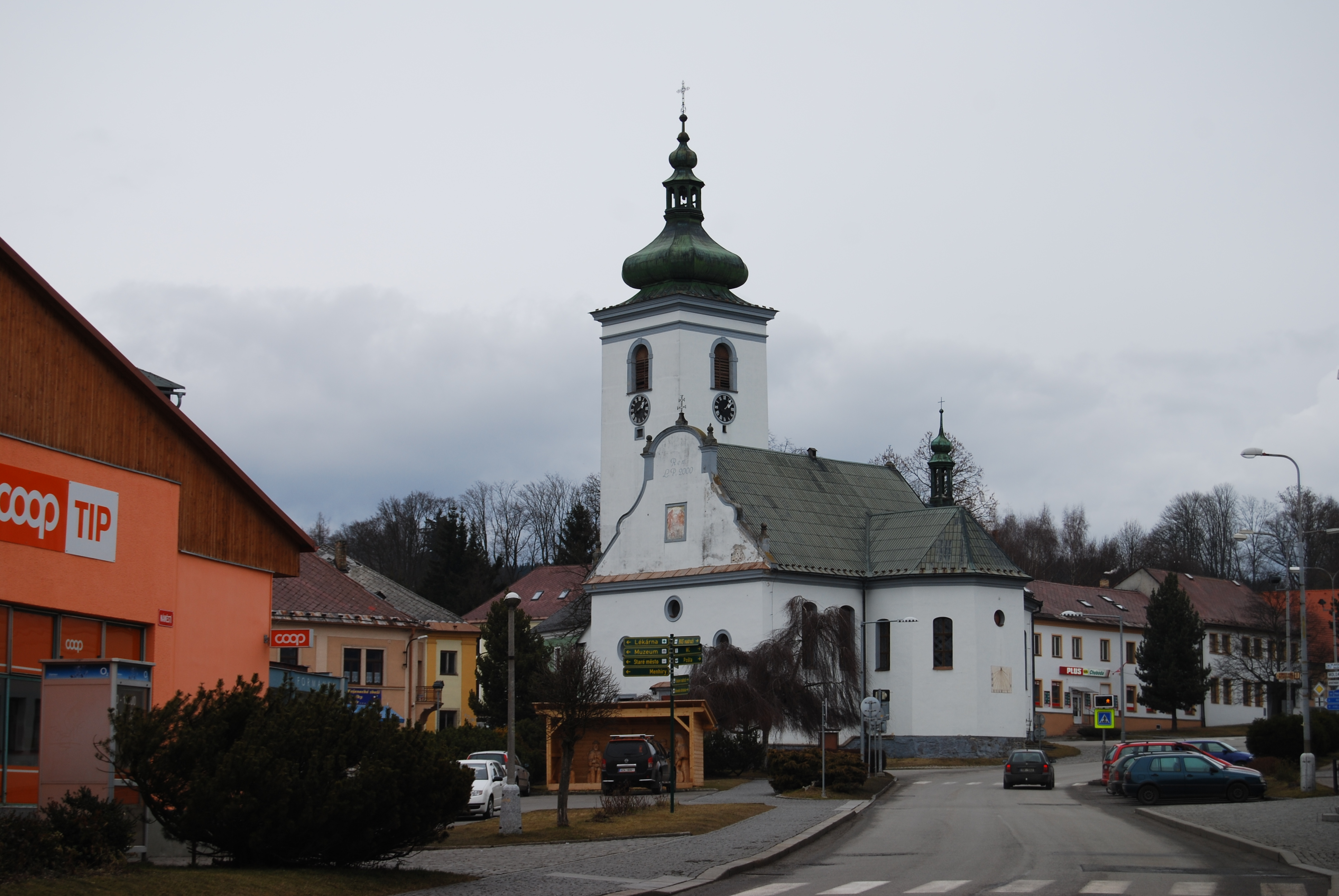
Town square with Church of Saint Catherine

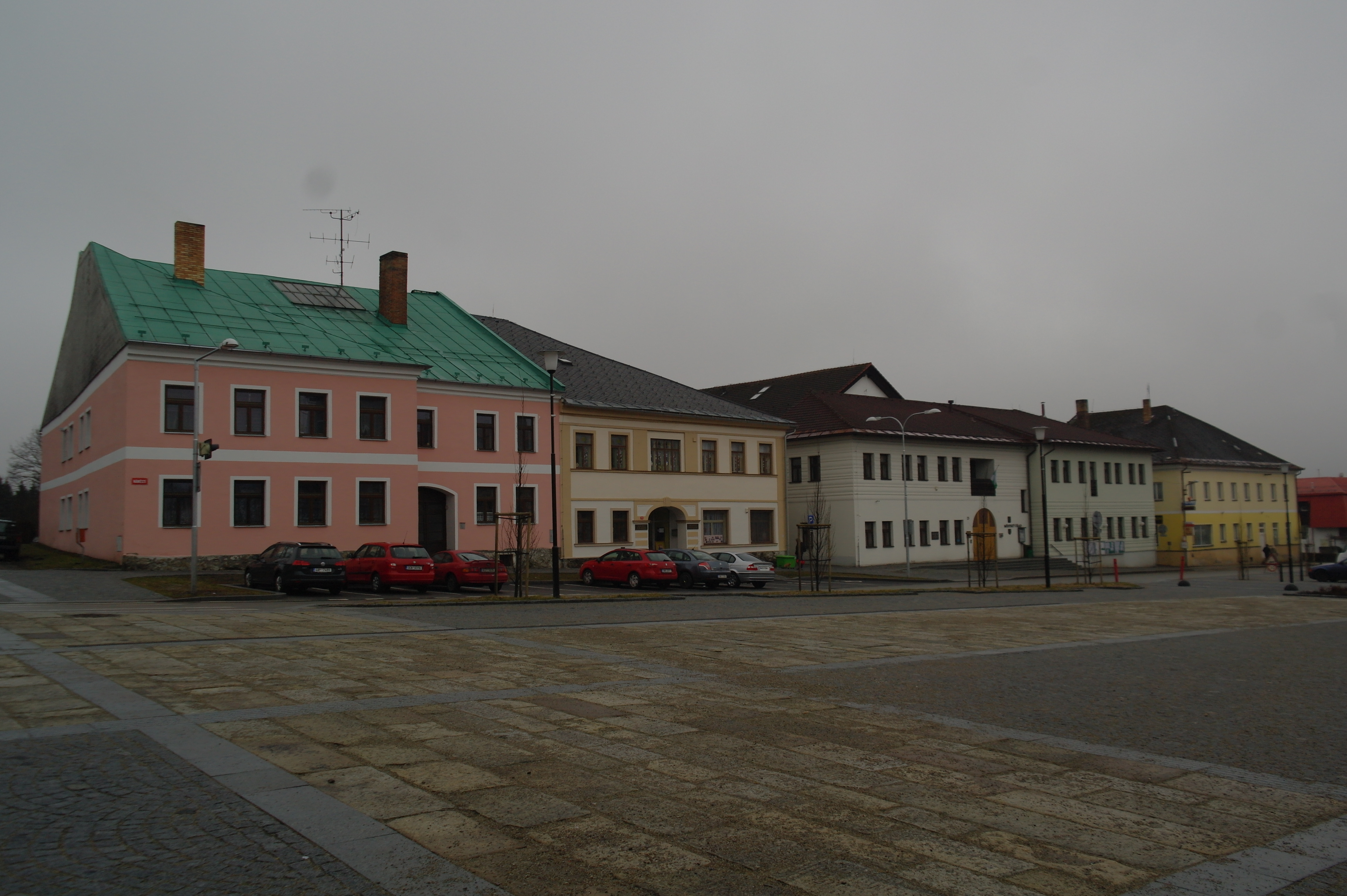
Houses on the square with the town hall in the middle

Until the beginning of the 18th century, the main source of income was the trade on the Golden Trail. Volary was the largest settlement of the carriers on the Czech part of the Prachatice Golden Trail and rapidly grew. They served as a place of rest and overnight stays for carriers, who imported salt and other goods on horses along an important medieval road from Passau to Prachatice. The shape of the square has also been adapted to the route of the trail. In the 16th century, during the heyday of the trail, there were 13 pubs and four blacksmiths in Volary. In 1596, Peter Vok of Rosenberg extended the Volary privileges for the right to seize horses and charge of merchants who deviated from the prescribed direction of the trail and avoided Volary.

Until the Hussite Wars, Volary was among the possessions of the Vyšehrad Chapter. After the Hussite Wars, several Czech families settled here. From 1503, the Rosenberg family became the owners of the settlement, and in 1600, it was acquired by Emperor Rudolf II. After 1719, it became a property of the Schwarzenberg family, who owned it until the revolution in 1848.

The Thirty Years' War led to the decline of the salt trade on the Golden Trail, instead it served the imperial army as a supply route. The area was several times a place of battles and Volary was the target of attacks by troops of both sides. After the war, trading on the Golden Trail never returned to its previous level. In the 18th century, following the abolition of the salt trade, the Golden Trail sank into insignificance; this also led to the demise of Volary. It became a stagnant and insignificant settlement.

=== 19th century ===
In the late 19th century the market town of Volary consisted of 224 houses with 2,069 German speaking inhabitants. Under the patronage of the authorities, the parish Church of Saint Catherine and the school were built and maintained. There was also in a public chapel of St. Florian and a town hall. The main sources of income were agriculture, cattle breeding and cattle fattening, linen weaving and the production of yarns. Every year Volary sold about 400 steers to Prague. The deposited borough was surrounded by agriculturally used meadows with numerous wooden houses, hay barns and traditional alpine architecture which gave the area along with the special construction of the houses an alpine character. The mostly wooden houses of Volary were built on flat land, close to each other, combined with large stones, gabled roofs and gabled fronts.

In July 1863, a major fire destroyed over 60 houses buildings. During the reconstruction after the fire of 1863, the typical Volary houses were not built entirely of wood, but partly with walls of stone and brick. Between 1856 and 1882, Volary was hit by the biggest series of fires. In 1871, Volary was promoted by to a town Emperor Franz Joseph I and its coat of arms was confirmed.

=== Volary Death March ===
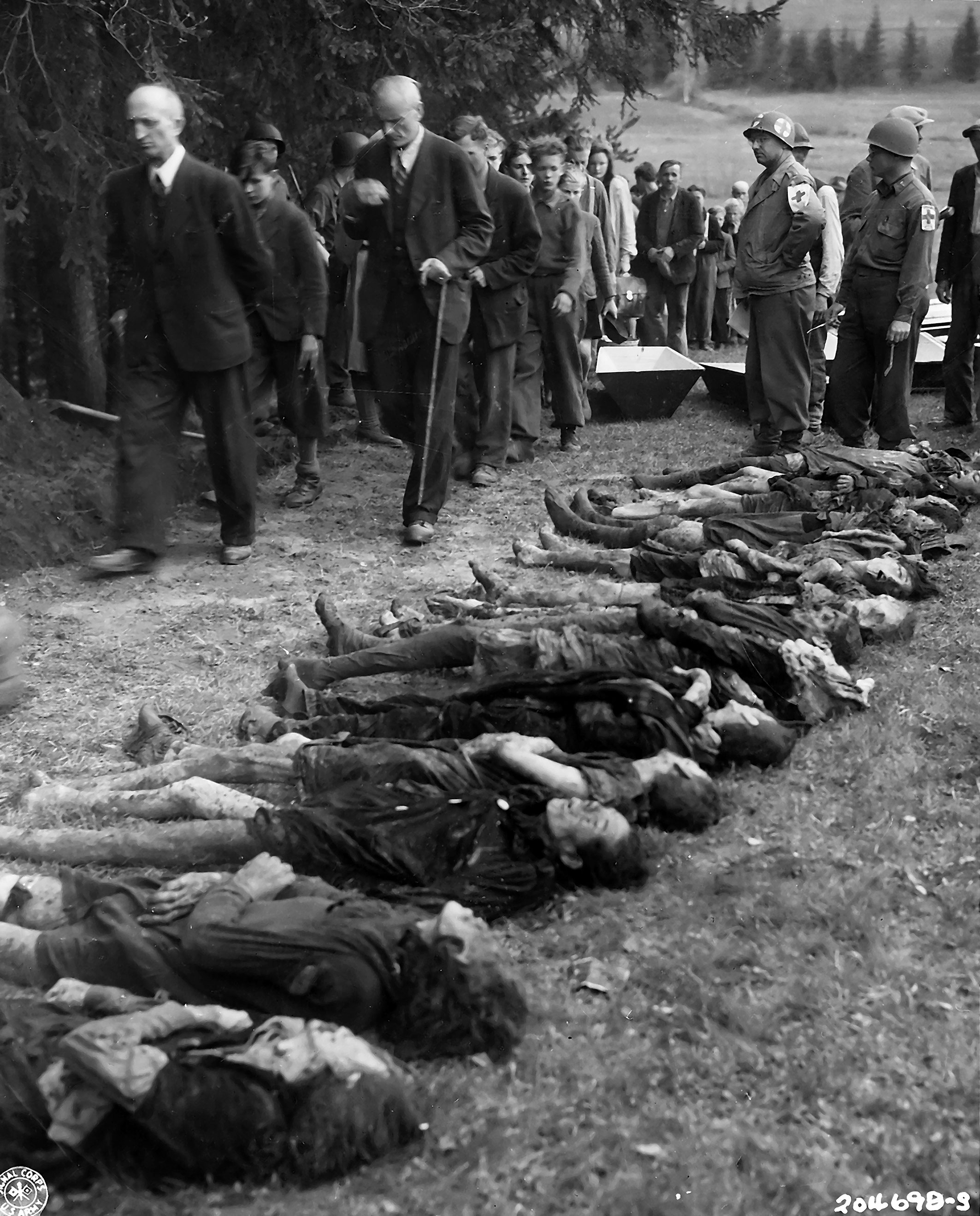
11 May 1945, US troops force Sudeten Germans in Volary to walk past corpses of Jewish women who died in the death march.

From 1938 to 1945, the town was occupied by Germany.

The "Volary Death March" involved more than 1,300 Jewish women over the course of over 800 kilometres (500 mi) and 106 days and nights. On 20 January 1945, around 1,000 female Jewish prisoners were evacuated from a subcamp of the Gross-Rosen concentration camp in Sława in western Poland. The women and girls had been sent there from Auschwitz-Birkenau a few months earlier, in order to dig anti-tank trenches to slow the Red Army's advance. More than a thousand others had to march southwest toward Germany. As they passed more camps, such the one at Zielona Góra, more women had to join the death march.

After the addition of about 300 inmates from Zielona Góra, on 29 January 1945 approximately 1,350 women set off for a 106-day-long march. By 6 March 1945, the 1,350 women had been reduced to 621. The remaining prisoners arrived at the Helmbrechts camp in Germany. The women received almost no food, and no medical treatment.

The women were forced onwards, until those who were still standing made it to Volary in Czechoslovakia on 5 May 1945. There, American forces liberated the women. Of the 1,350 forced on the death march, only 118 were still living. Those who were alive were in terrible condition; although the Americans took them to an improvised hospital, twenty-six died within days. 17 victims of the death march were buried in a mass grave near Volary, another eight women died in a nearby military hospital. The last confirmed combat death of World War II in Europe, United States Army Private First Class Charley Havlat, occurred near Volary on 7 May 1945.

=== Post-war events ===
Following the end of World War II, the town was returned to Czechoslovakia. As of March 1946, the German population was expelled due to the Beneš decrees.

In 1961, the municipalities of Chlum and Mlynářovice were incorporated into Volary.

== Demographics ==
Historical population

Year	Pop.	±%
1869	4,611	—
1880	5,416	+17.5%
1890	5,516	+1.8%
1900	5,291	−4.1%
1910	5,549	+4.9%

Year	Pop.	±%
1921	5,557	+0.1%
1930	5,865	+5.5%
1950	2,703	−53.9%
1961	3,175	+17.5%
1970	3,344	+5.3%

Year	Pop.	±%
1980	3,588	+7.3%
1991	3,917	+9.2%
2001	4,068	+3.9%
2011	3,744	−8.0%
2021	3,652	−2.5%

Source: Censuses

== Transport ==
The I/39 road from Český Krumlov to Vimperk runs through the town.

Volary is located on the railway lines Číčenice–Haidmühle and Strakonice–Volary.

== Sights ==
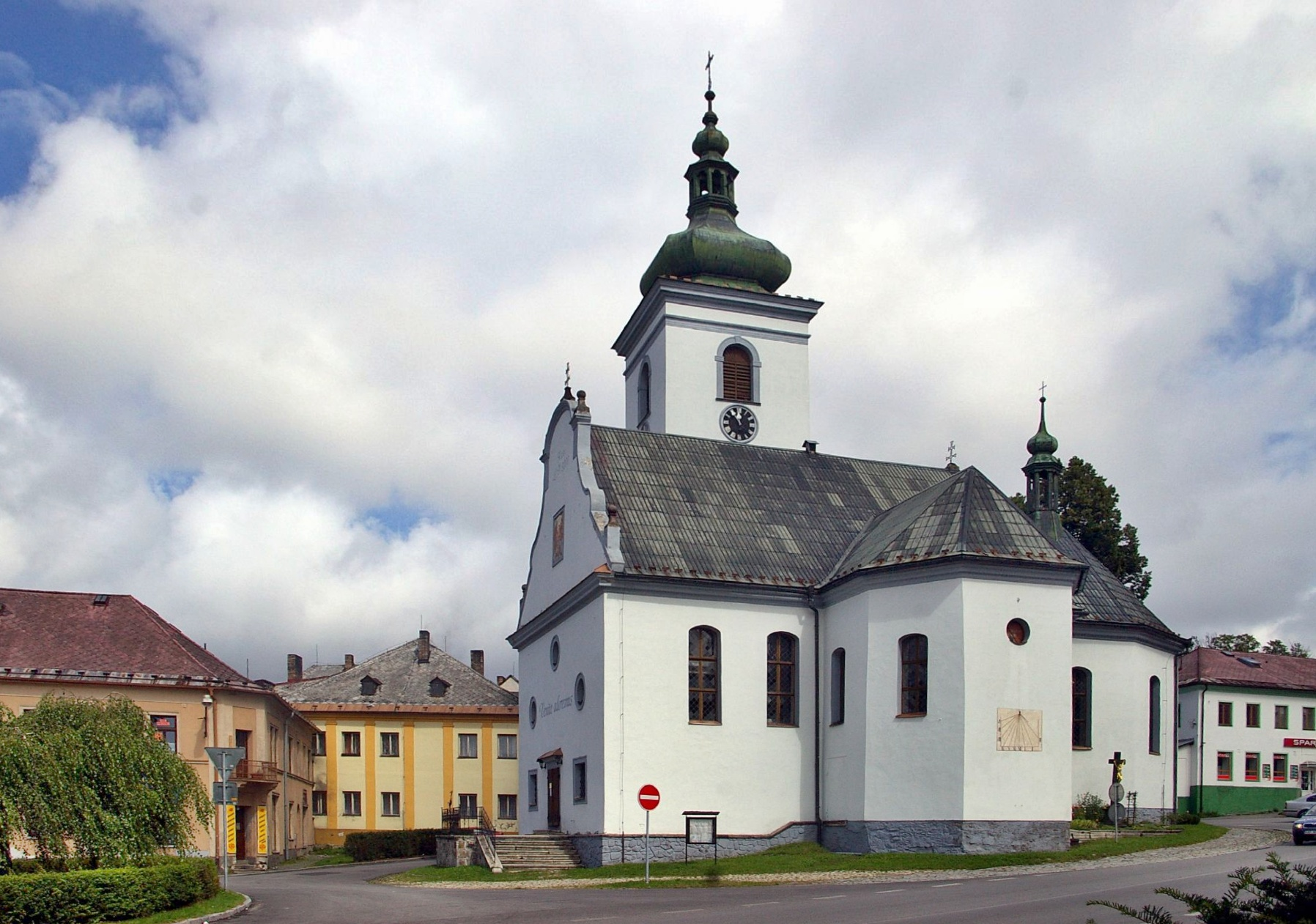
Church of Saint Catherine

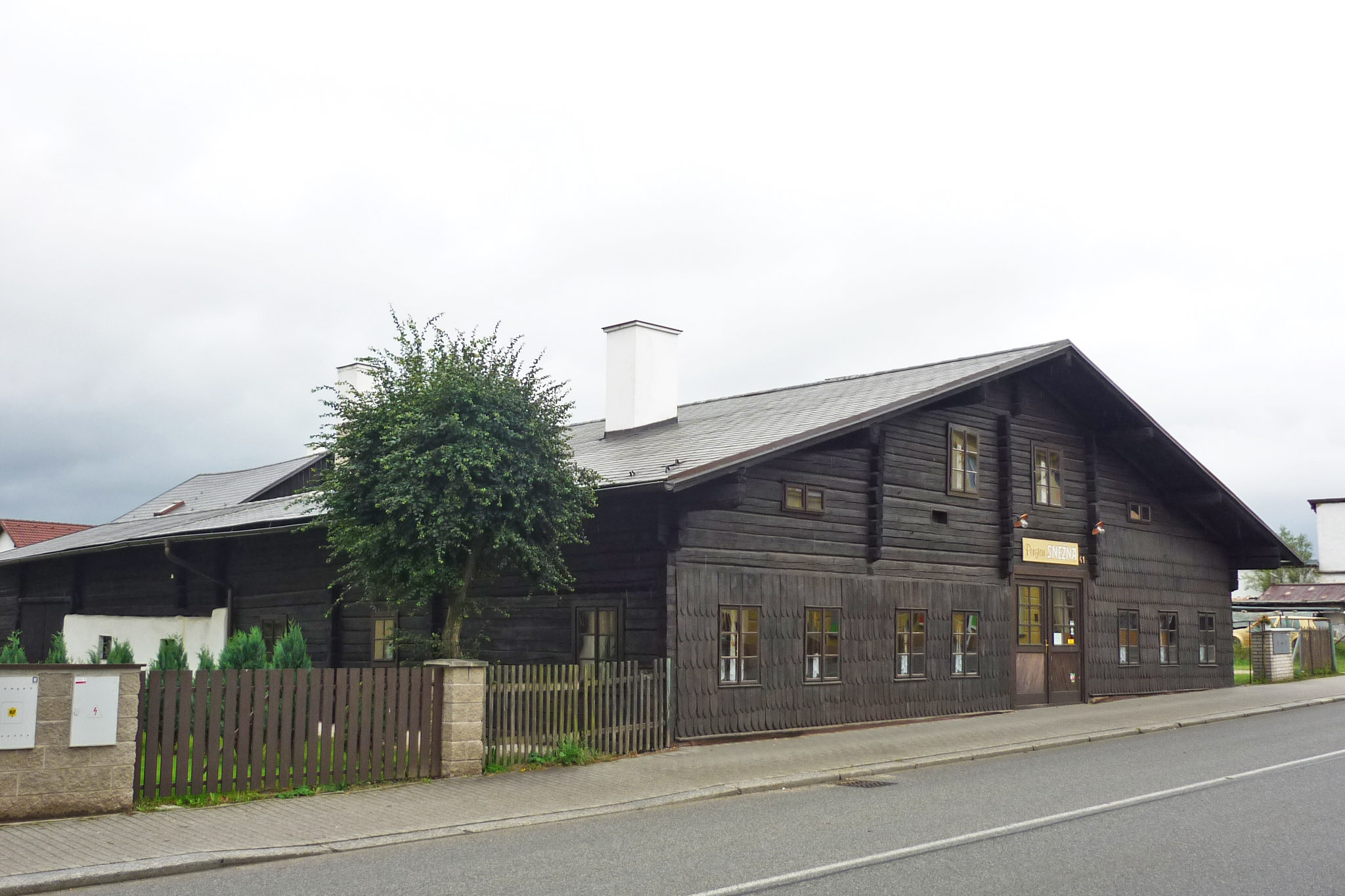
A house built in the Volary Alpine style

The main landmark of the town is the Church of Saint Catherine. It was built in 1669–1690, on the site of a late Gothic church. From the previous church remained a small portal under the tower. During the 18th century, the church was repeatedly severely damaged by fires caused by lightning strikes. Today's appearance of the building is a result of the reconstructions in 1757 and 1863.

The most valuable buildings of the town include preserved unique old wooden houses of the Alpine style. They are timbered and half-timbered houses with an attic room, a carved porch in a suspended gable and a gabled roof. There is also the Volary Museum in one of these timbered houses. The area is protected as a village monument reservation.

On the special cemetery of victims of the death march there is the Memorial of Victims of the Death March.

== Notable people ==
- Gustav Herglotz (1881–1953), German Bohemian physicist
- Jeanette Schmid (1924–2005), transgender whistler
- Herwig Zahorka (1932–2019), German writer and historian

== Twin towns – sister cities ==
Volary is twinned with:

- Grainet, Germany
- Waldkirchen, Germany
- Wallern an der Trattnach, Austria
