= Herwig Zahorka =

German writer and historian

Personal details
- Born: 12 June 1932; Volary, Czechoslovakia
- Died: 23 February 2019 (aged 86); Mainz, Germany
- Citizenship: German
- Occupation: Writer, historian

Herwig Zahorka (12 June 1932 – 23 February 2019) was a German writer and historian.

== Biography ==
Zahorka was born on 12 June 1932 in Volary, Czechoslovakia. His parents are Franz and Maria. He had two sisters. He has conducted research in several countries, especially in Asia. He graduated with an M.Sc. degree from the University of Göttingen in Forest Science/Tropical Forest Ecology. Later he became director of forestry in Wiesbaden, Germany.

He was a retired director of the Hessen state forestry service in Wiesbaden who had lived in Indonesia since 1995 and was awarded the service star of the Federal Republic of Germany Verdienstkreuz am Bande. This decoration was awarded by the German president for Zahorka's services in advancing German-Indonesian cooperation and was handed over by the German ambassador to Indonesia, Georg Witschel in Jakarta.

He died on 23 February 2019 in Mainz, Germany, at the age of 86.
