= Haidmühle =

- Municipality
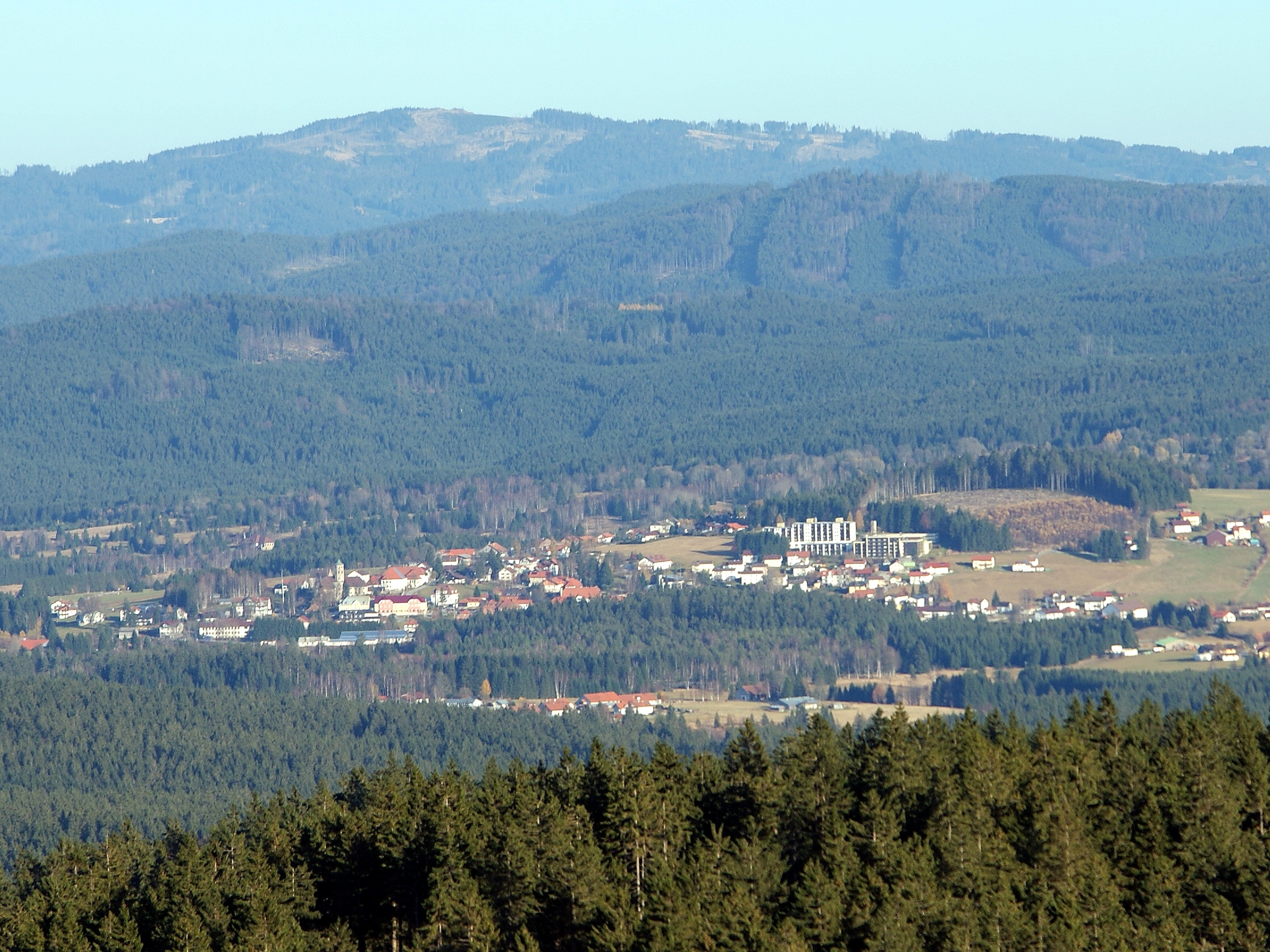
- Haidmühle ssen from Haidel

- Coat of arms

- Location of Haidmühle within Freyung-Grafenau district
- Interactive map of Haidmühle
- Location within Germany Location within Bavaria
- Coordinates: 48°49′36″N 13°46′31″E
- Country: Germany
- State: Bavaria
- Admin. region: Niederbayern
- District: Freyung-Grafenau

Government
  - Mayor (2023–29): Roland Schraml (CSU)

Area
  - Total: 21.03 km^{2} (8.12 sq mi)
- Elevation: 831 m (2,726 ft)

Population (2025-12-31)
  - Total: 1,345
  - Density: 63.96/km^{2} (165.6/sq mi)
- Time zone: UTC+01:00 (CET)
  - Summer (DST): UTC+02:00 (CEST)
- Postal codes: 94145
- Dialling codes: 08556
- Vehicle registration: FRG
- Website: https://haidmuehle.eu/

Haidmühle (Czech: Borské Mlýny) is a municipality in the district of Freyung-Grafenau in Bavaria in Germany.

== Geography ==
=== Geographical location ===
The community lies in the Donau-Wald on the Studená Vltava in the Bavarian Forest, on the border with the Czech Republic. Haidmühle is located 25 km from Freyung, 24 km from Waldkirchen, and 20 km from the border with Austria.

A few meters away from the village is the border crossing Nové Údolí (Neuthal) to Stožec, which is open to pedestrians and cyclists.

Haidmühle was formerly a railway border station, connected by the Waldkirchen–Haidmühle railway to Waldkirchen and Passau, and by the Číčenice–Haidmühle railway to Volary and Prachatice. The section in the Czech Republic is still in use. Part of the route is a museum train Pošumavská jižní dráha in operation.

=== Constituent Communities ===
The municipality consists of the following districts:

- Auersbergsreut
- Bischofsreut
- Frauenberg
- Haberau
- Haidmühle
- Langreut
- Leopoldsreut
- Ludwigsreut
- Marchhäuser
- Raumreut
- Schnellenzipf
- Schwarzthal
- Theresienreut

There are the following districts: Bischofsreut, Philippsreut, Frauenberg.

== History ==
The village in the former Bishopric of Passau was secularized in 1803 with the majority of the Bishopric and the territory in favor of Ferdinand of Tuscany and fell until 1805 with the peace treaties of Brno and Bratislava to Bayern. In the course of administrative reform in Bavaria originated with the municipality edict of 1818, the church today.

In the spring of 1933, when the community dedicated a Ritter-von-Leeb House, Wilhelm Ritter von Leeb was among the guests of honor. In June 1940, locals crammed into the Niederl Inn to watch with intense curiosity the movie Eine Nacht im Mai.

Since 1946 belonged to the former glassworks settlement Schwarzthal the municipality Bischofsreut who came to Haidmühle 1978.

On 27 April 1951, the church name was officially changed in Frauenberg Haidmühle.
