= Bayerischer Plöckenstein =

Mountain in Germany

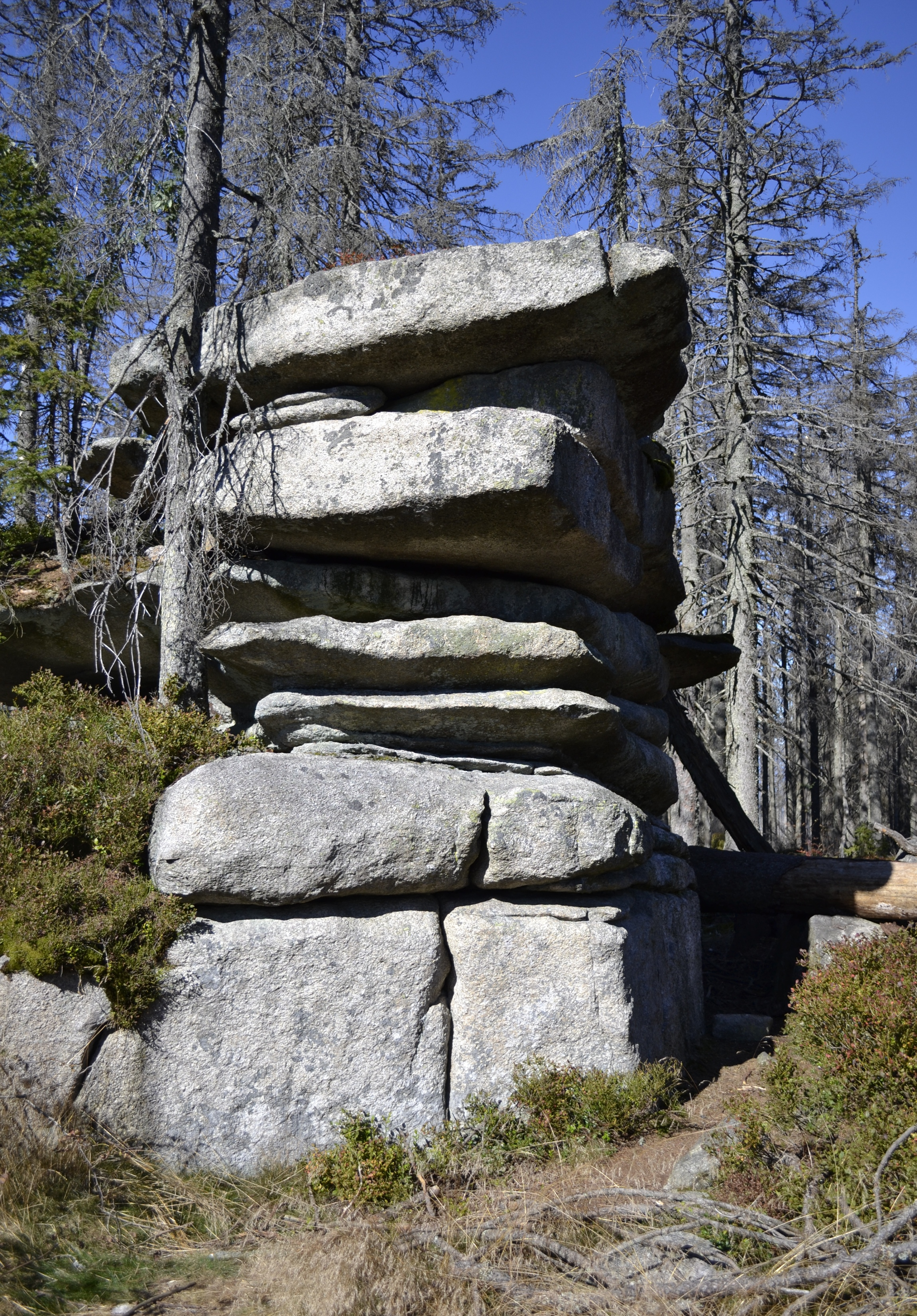

Highest point
- Elevation: 1,366 m (4,482 ft)
- Prominence: 45 m (148 ft)
- Coordinates: 48°46′20″N 13°50′50″E

Geography
- Location within Bavaria Location within Czech Republic
- Location: Bavaria, Germany; Czech Republic
- Parent range: Bavarian Forest

Bayerischer Plöckenstein (Czech: Trojmezná) is a 1,366 m (4,482 ft) high mountain of the Bavarian Forest (German: Bayerischer Wald) and Bohemian Forest, (Czech: Šumava) on the border between Germany and the Czech Republic. It is not far from the Plöckenstein itself.
