= Černá hora (Bohemian Forest) =

Mountain in the Bohemian Forest

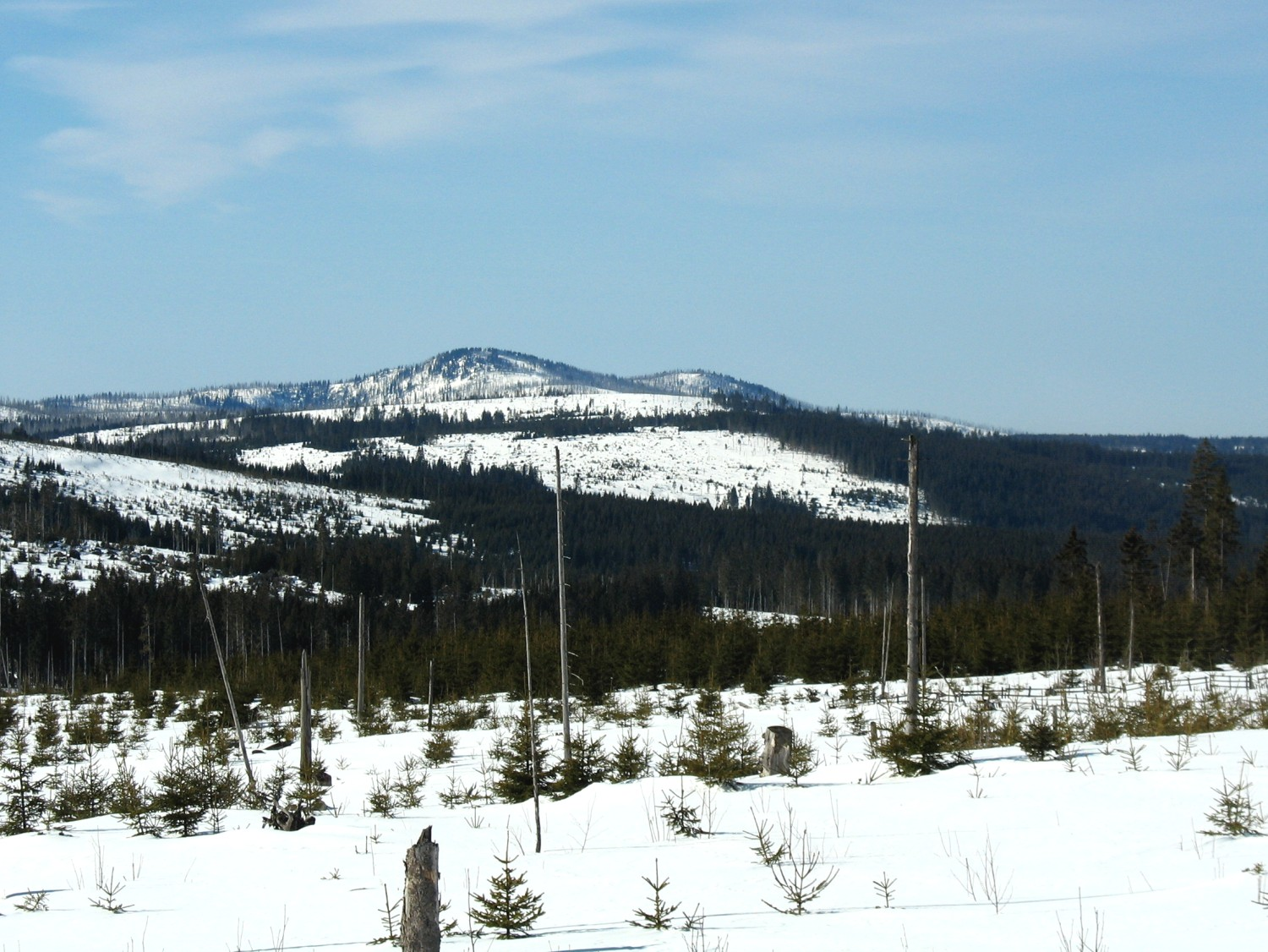

Highest point
- Elevation: 1,316 m (4,318 ft)
- Coordinates: 48°58′44″N 13°33′3″E

Geography
- Location within Czech Republic
- Location: Kvilda, South Bohemian Region, Czech Republic
- Parent range: Bohemian Forest

Černá hora (i.e. Black Mountain; German: Schwarzenberg) is a 1,316-metre-high (4,318 ft) mountain in the Bohemian Forest, near the border with Bavaria, Germany. Its summit is entirely covered in dense spruce forest. At the foot of the mountain there is the source of the longest Czech river, the Vltava.

The northern and eastern slopes of the mountain lie in the municipal territory of Kvilda, the western slopes lie in the territory of Modrava.
