= Stožec =

- Municipality
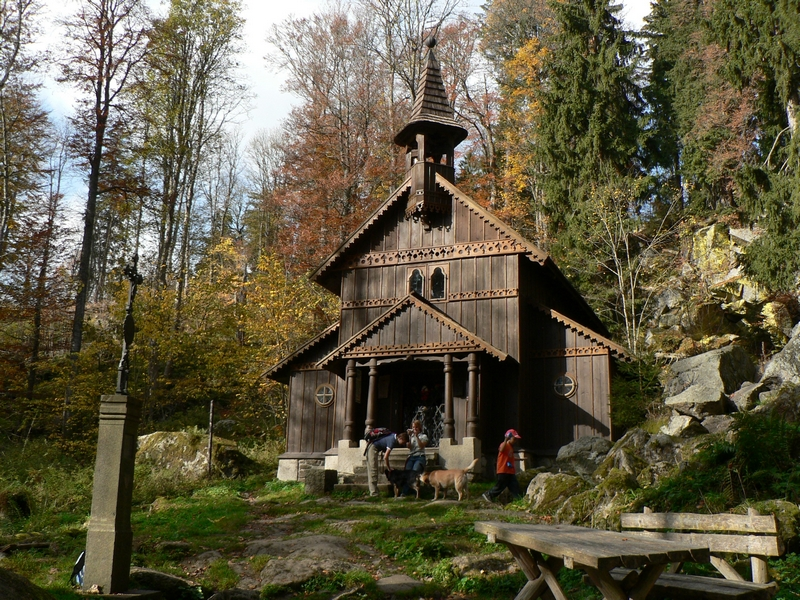
- Chapel of the Virgin Mary

- Flag Coat of arms

- Location in the Czech Republic
- Coordinates: 48°51′34″N 13°49′17″E
- Country: Czech Republic
- Region: South Bohemian
- District: Prachatice
- First mentioned: 1769

Area
  - Total: 104.72 km^{2} (40.43 sq mi)
- Elevation: 780 m (2,560 ft)

Population (2026-01-01)
  - Total: 209
  - Density: 2.00/km^{2} (5.17/sq mi)
- Time zone: UTC+1 (CET)
  - Summer (DST): UTC+2 (CEST)
- Postal code: 384 44
- Website: www.stozec.eu

Stožec (German: Tusset) is a municipality and village in Prachatice District in the South Bohemian Region of the Czech Republic. It has about 200 inhabitants.

Stožec lies approximately 22 kilometres (14 mi) south-west of Prachatice, 50 km (31 mi) west of České Budějovice, and 143 km (89 mi) south of Prague.

== Administrative division ==
Stožec consists of three municipal parts (in brackets population according to the 2021 census):

- Stožec (115)
- České Žleby (60)
- Dobrá (19)

== Demographics ==
Historical population
| Year | Pop. | ±% |
|---|---|---|
| 1869 | 2,609 | — |
| 1880 | 2,920 | +11.9% |
| 1890 | 2,847 | −2.5% |
| 1900 | 2,733 | −4.0% |
| 1910 | 2,721 | −0.4% |
| 1921 | 2,731 | +0.4% |
| 1930 | 2,811 | +2.9% |
| 1950 | 599 | −78.7% |
| 1961 | 378 | −36.9% |
| 1970 | 254 | −32.8% |
| 1980 | 213 | −16.1% |
| 1991 | 168 | −21.1% |
| 2001 | 219 | +30.4% |
| 2011 | 196 | −10.5% |
| 2021 | 194 | −1.0% |
Source: Censuses

== Notable people ==
- Adolf Pascher (1881–1945), botanist
