= Budkov =

Budkov may refer to places in the Czech Republic:

- Budkov (Prachatice District), a municipality and village in the South Bohemian Region
- Budkov (Třebíč District), a municipality and village in the Vysočina Region
- Budkov, a village and part of Střížovice (Jindřichův Hradec District) in the South Bohemian Region
- Budkov, a village and part of Struhařov (Benešov District) in the Central Bohemian Region
