= Mahouš =

- Municipality
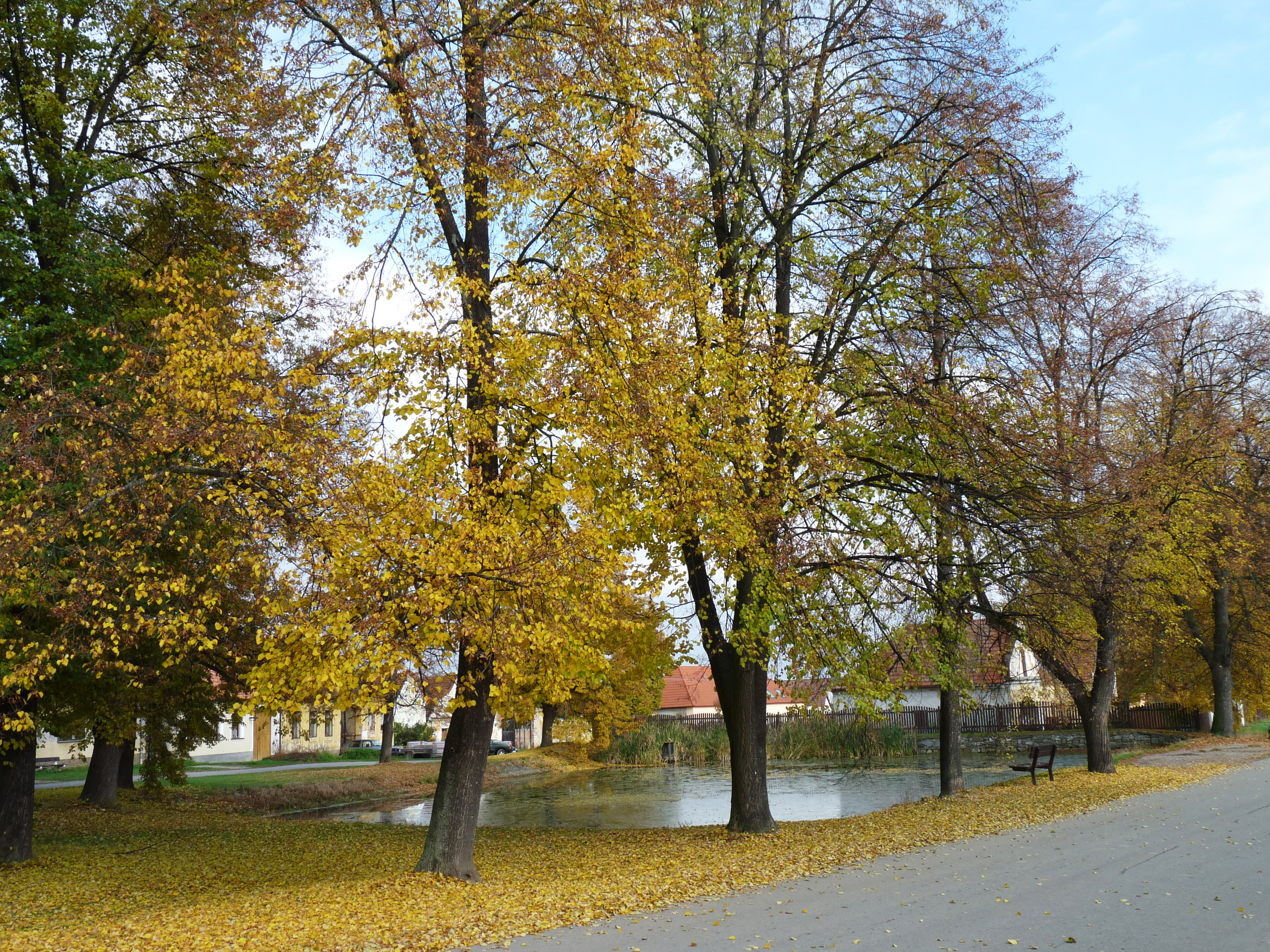
- Centre of Mahouš

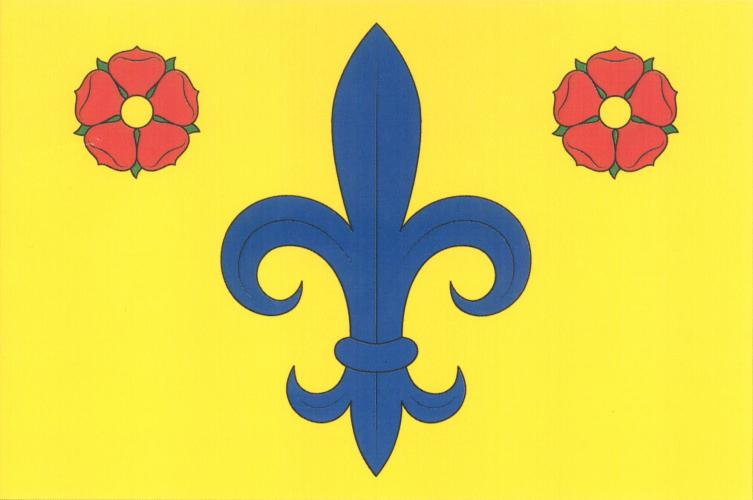
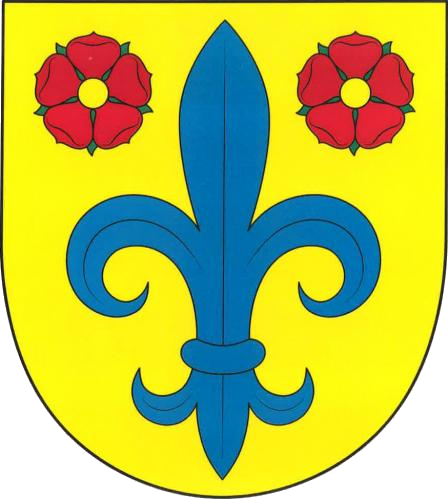
- Flag Coat of arms

- Location in the Czech Republic
- Coordinates: 49°2′53″N 14°15′22″E
- Country: Czech Republic
- Region: South Bohemian
- District: Prachatice
- First mentioned: 1300

Area
  - Total: 5.96 km^{2} (2.30 sq mi)
- Elevation: 425 m (1,394 ft)

Population (2026-01-01)
  - Total: 147
  - Density: 24.7/km^{2} (63.9/sq mi)
- Time zone: UTC+1 (CET)
  - Summer (DST): UTC+2 (CEST)
- Postal code: 384 11
- Website: mahous.cz

Mahouš is a municipality and village in Prachatice District in the South Bohemian Region of the Czech Republic. It has about 100 inhabitants.

Mahouš lies approximately 19 kilometres (12 mi) east of Prachatice, 19 km (12 mi) north-west of České Budějovice, and 117 km (73 mi) south of Prague.

== Demographics ==
Historical population
Year	Pop.	±%
1869	389	—
1880	386	−0.8%
1890	338	−12.4%
1900	320	−5.3%
1910	322	+0.6%
1921	332	+3.1%
1930	303	−8.7%
1950	202	−33.3%
1961	167	−17.3%
1970	140	−16.2%
1980	145	+3.6%
1991	121	−16.6%
2001	151	+24.8%
2011	147	−2.6%
2021	164	+11.6%
Source: Censuses
