= Mičovice =

- Municipality
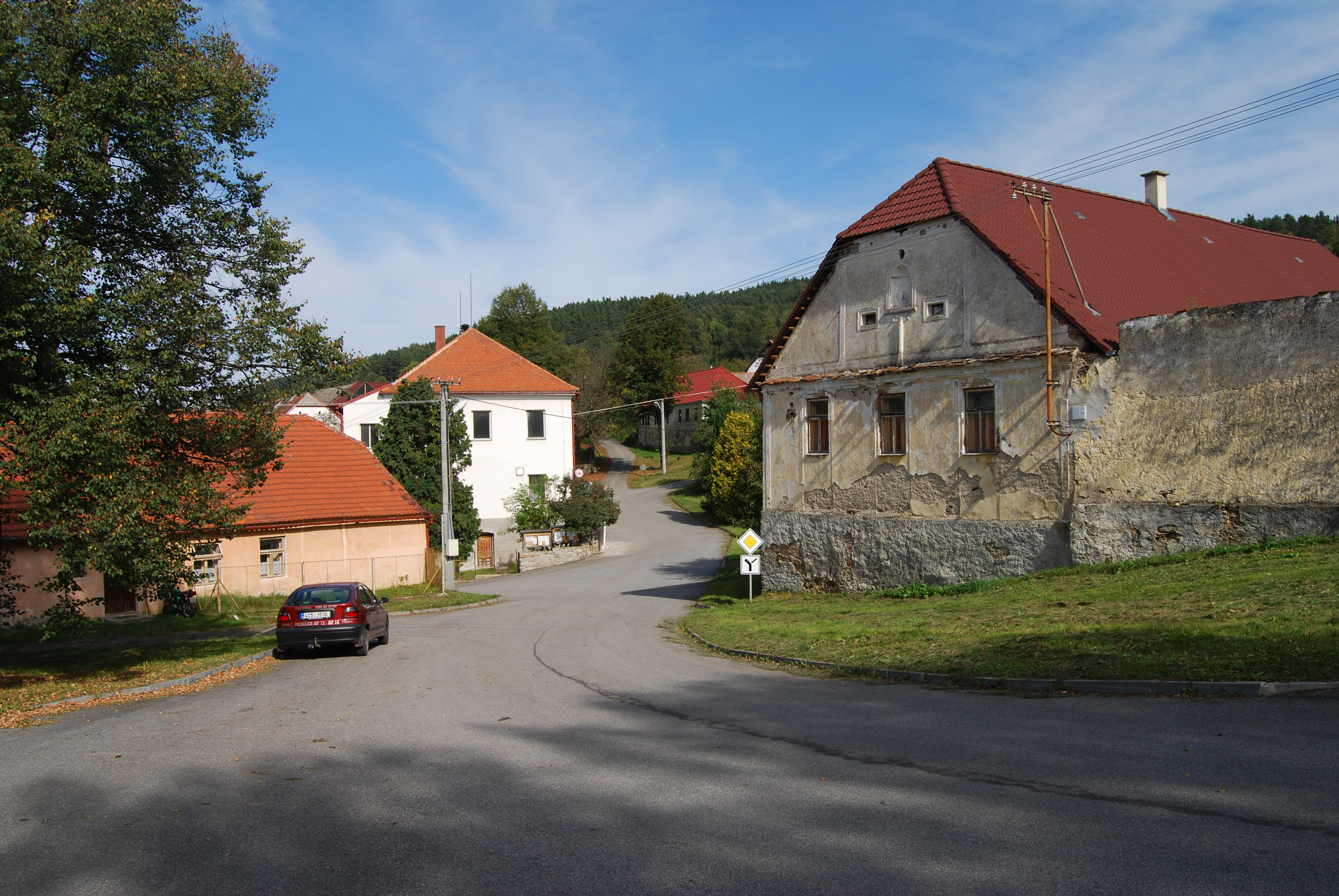
- Centre of Mičovice

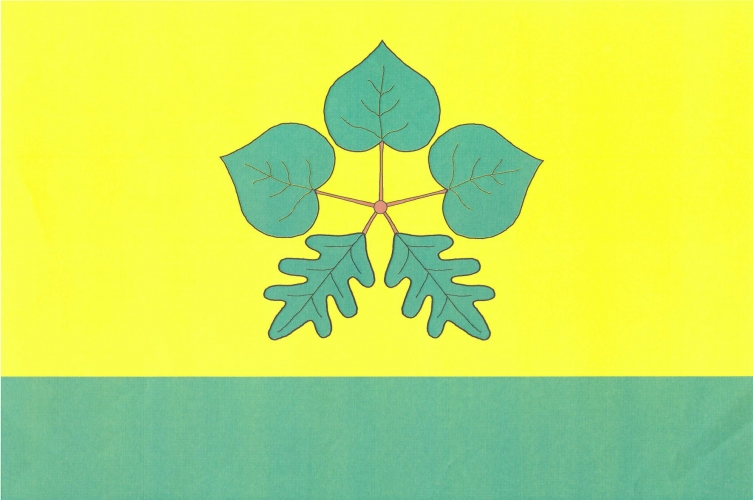
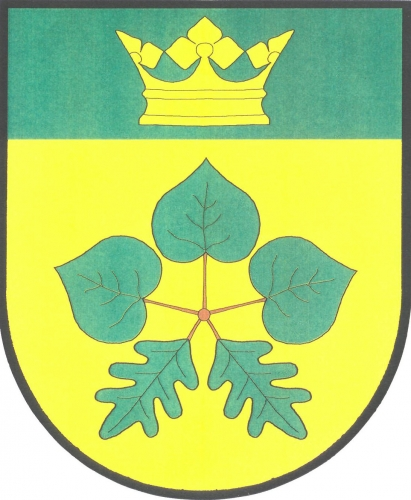
- Flag Coat of arms

- Location in the Czech Republic
- Coordinates: 48°59′1″N 14°7′30″E
- Country: Czech Republic
- Region: South Bohemian
- District: Prachatice
- First mentioned: 1400

Area
  - Total: 23.37 km^{2} (9.02 sq mi)
- Elevation: 575 m (1,886 ft)

Population (2026-01-01)
  - Total: 370
  - Density: 16/km^{2} (41/sq mi)
- Time zone: UTC+1 (CET)
  - Summer (DST): UTC+2 (CEST)
- Postal code: 383 01
- Website: www.micovice.cz

Mičovice is a municipality and village in Prachatice District in the South Bohemian Region of the Czech Republic. It has about 400 inhabitants.

Mičovice lies approximately 10 kilometres (6 mi) east of Prachatice, 26 km (16 mi) west of České Budějovice, and 124 km (77 mi) south of Prague.

== Administrative division ==
Mičovice consists of five municipal parts (in brackets population according to the 2021 census):

- Mičovice (173)
- Frantoly (26)
- Jáma (68)
- Klenovice (58)
- Ratiborova Lhota (34)

== Demographics ==
Historical population
Year	Pop.	±%
1869	1,084	—
1880	1,098	+1.3%
1890	988	−10.0%
1900	949	−3.9%
1910	897	−5.5%
1921	950	+5.9%
1930	925	−2.6%
1950	537	−41.9%
1961	429	−20.1%
1970	381	−11.2%
1980	355	−6.8%
1991	304	−14.4%
2001	320	+5.3%
2011	312	−2.5%
2021	359	+15.1%
Source: Censuses
