= Prachatice District =

Prachatice District Okres Prachatice
- District
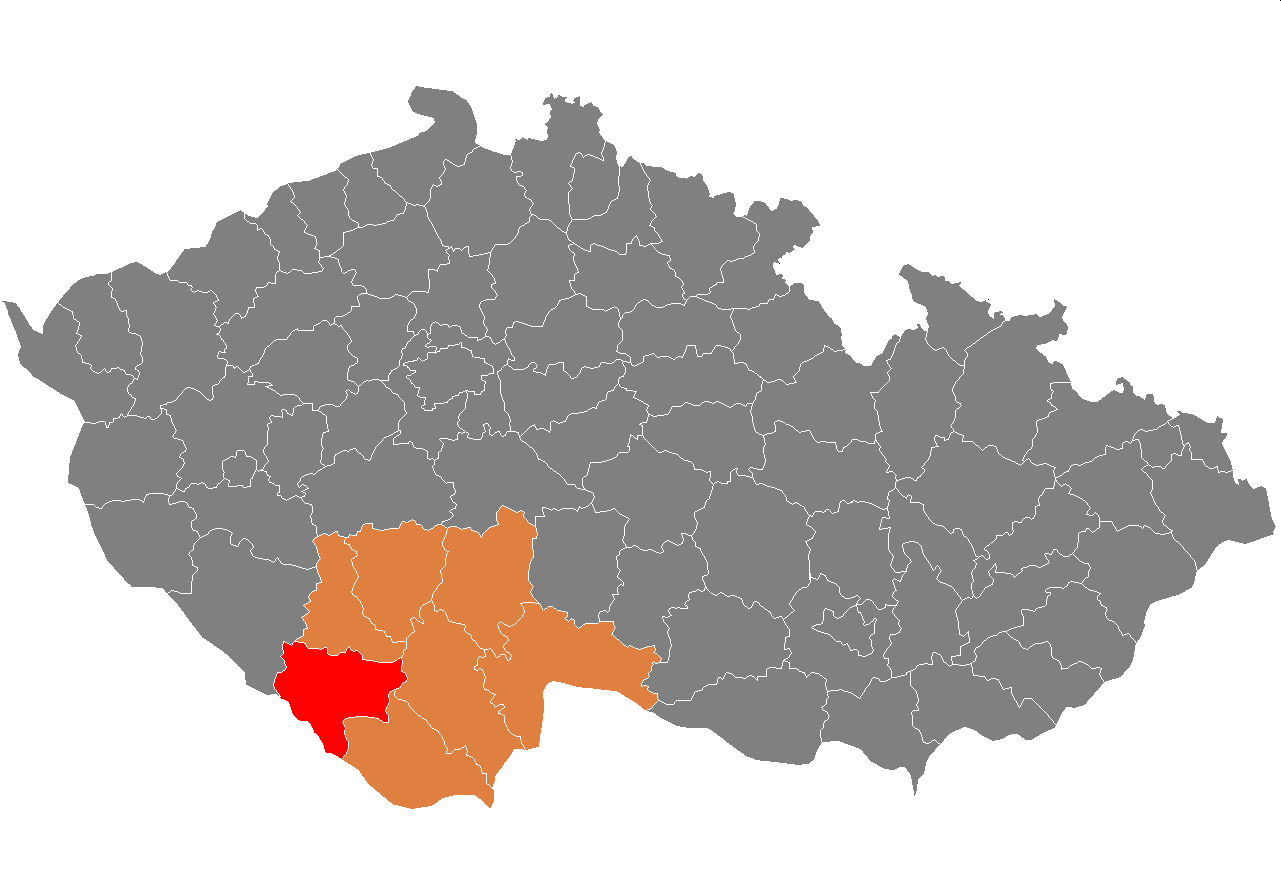
- Location in the South Bohemian Region within the Czech Republic
- Coordinates: 49°0′N 13°54′E
- Country: Czech Republic
- Region: South Bohemian
- Capital: Prachatice

Area
  - Total: 1,376.75 km^{2} (531.57 sq mi)

Population (2026)
  - Total: 50,952
  - Density: 37.009/km^{2} (95.853/sq mi)
- Time zone: UTC+1 (CET)
  - Summer (DST): UTC+2 (CEST)
- Municipalities: 65
- * Towns: 6
- * Market towns: 4

Prachatice District (Czech: okres Prachatice) is a district in the South Bohemian Region of the Czech Republic. Its capital is the town of Prachatice.

== Administrative division ==
Prachatice District is divided into two administrative districts of municipalities with extended competence: Prachatice and Vimperk.

=== List of municipalities ===
Towns are marked in bold and market towns in italics:

Babice - Bohumilice - Bohunice - Borová Lada - Bošice - Budkov - Buk - Bušanovice - Chlumany - Chroboly - Chvalovice - Čkyně - Drslavice - Dub - Dvory - Horní Vltavice - Hracholusky - Husinec - Kratušín - Křišťanov - Ktiš - Kubova Huť - Kvilda - Lažiště - Lčovice - Lenora - Lhenice - Lipovice - Lužice - Mahouš - Malovice - Mičovice - Nebahovy - Němčice - Netolice - Nicov - Nová Pec - Nové Hutě - Olšovice - Pěčnov - Prachatice - Radhostice - Stachy - Stožec - Strážný - Strunkovice nad Blanicí - Šumavské Hoštice - Svatá Maří - Těšovice - Tvrzice - Újezdec - Vacov - Vimperk - Vitějovice - Vlachovo Březí - Volary - Vrbice - Záblatí - Zábrdí - Zálezly - Zbytiny - Zdíkov - Žárovná - Želnava - Žernovice

== Geography ==
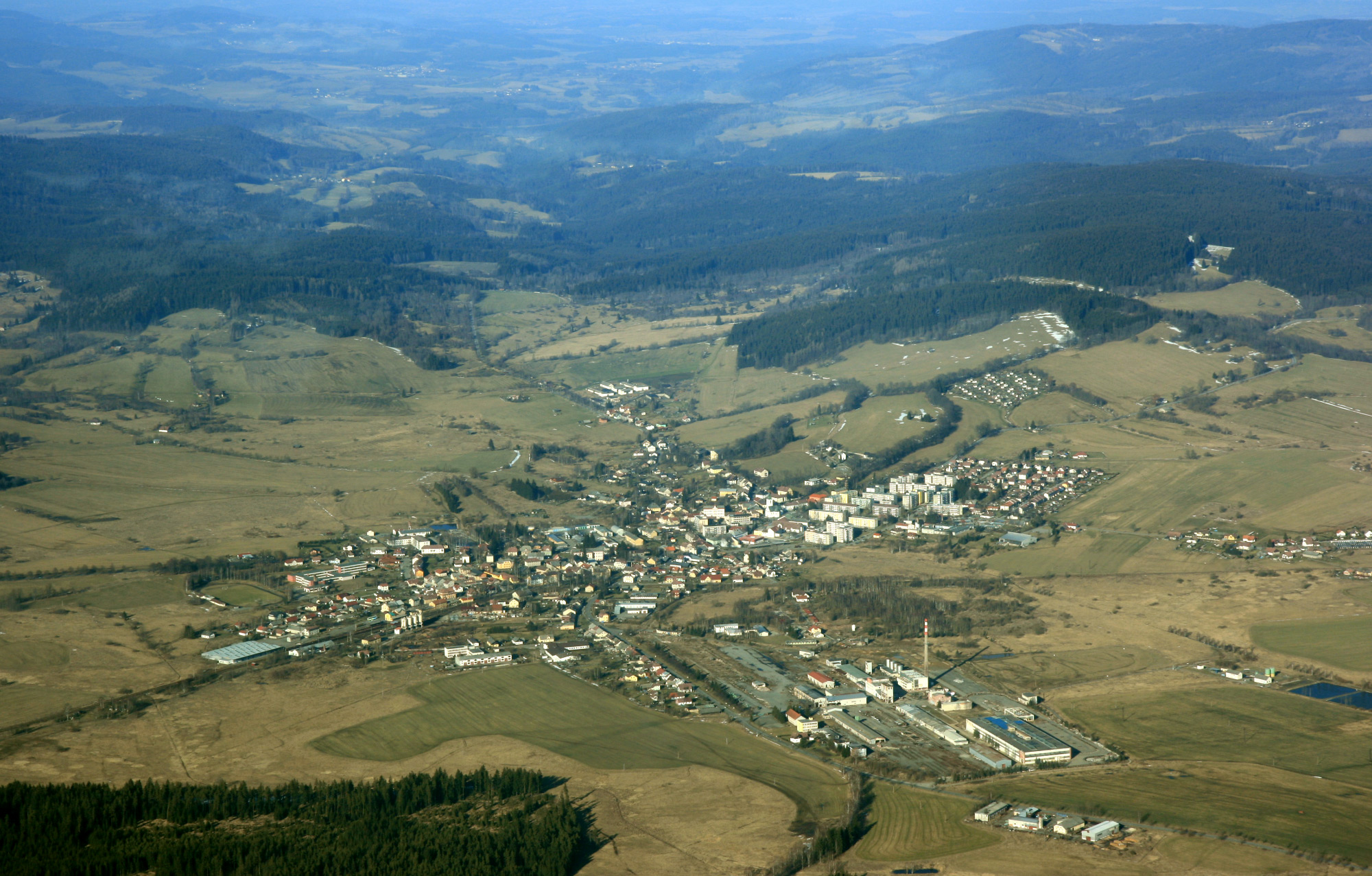
Volary and surrounding landscape

Prachatice District borders Germany in the southwest and briefly Austria in the south. Most of the territory has a foothill character, but along the state border, the landscape is mountainous, and in the east, the terrain is only slightly undulating. The majority of the district is located at an altitude of 600–800 m. The territory extends into three geomorphological mesoregions: Bohemian Forest Foothills (north, centre and southeast), Bohemian Forest (south and west), and České Budějovice Basin (small part in the east). The highest point of the district is the mountain Plechý in Nová Pec with an elevation of 1,378 m (4,521 ft), the lowest point is the river bed of the Bezdrevský Stream in Malovice at 410 m (1,350 ft).

From the total district area of 1,376.8 km^{2} (531.6 sq mi), agricultural land occupies 495.8 km^{2} (191.4 sq mi), forests occupy 728.5 km^{2} (281.3 sq mi), and water area occupies 28.2 km^{2} (10.9 sq mi). Forests cover 52.9% of the district's area.

The most important river is the Vltava, which originates here as the Teplá Vltava and flows across the Bohemian Forest mountain range. The Volyňka also originates here and flows to the north. The eastern part of the territory is drained by the Blanice River. This part of the district is rich in fishponds, otherwise there are not many bodies of water. The largest body of water is the Husinec Reservoir, with an area of 61 ha (150 acres). A small part of the Lipno Reservoir also extends into the district. Near Plechý is Plešné Lake, one of the few natural lakes in the country.

From west to south, the Šumava National Park stretches across the territory of the district, while the centre of the territory falls under the protection of the Šumava Protected Landscape Area.

== Demographics ==
A German minority used to live in Prachatice, composing 47% of the district's population by 1930. After World War II, the German population was expelled, and the district experienced a notable demographic change as more ethnic Czechs were settled in the region.

As of 2026, Prachatice District is the third least populated district in the country.

Historical population

| Year | Pop. | ±% |
|---|---|---|
| 1869 | 86,745 | — |
| 1880 | 92,183 | +6.3% |
| 1890 | 90,390 | −1.9% |
| 1900 | 90,588 | +0.2% |
| 1910 | 91,757 | +1.3% |

| Year | Pop. | ±% |
|---|---|---|
| 1921 | 88,058 | −4.0% |
| 1930 | 85,789 | −2.6% |
| 1950 | 47,835 | −44.2% |
| 1961 | 48,239 | +0.8% |
| 1970 | 47,925 | −0.7% |

| Year | Pop. | ±% |
|---|---|---|
| 1980 | 50,119 | +4.6% |
| 1991 | 50,985 | +1.7% |
| 2001 | 51,387 | +0.8% |
| 2011 | 50,028 | −2.6% |
| 2021 | 49,379 | −1.3% |

Source: Censuses

=== Most populous municipalities ===
| Name | Population | Area (km^{2}) |
|---|---|---|
| Prachatice | 11,036 | 39 |
| Vimperk | 7,270 | 80 |
| Volary | 3,657 | 108 |
| Netolice | 2,494 | 26 |
| Lhenice | 2,161 | 39 |
| Vlachovo Březí | 1,738 | 20 |
| Zdíkov | 1,697 | 32 |
| Čkyně | 1,553 | 21 |
| Vacov | 1,430 | 35 |
| Husinec | 1,389 | 10 |

== Economy ==
The largest employers with headquarters in Prachatice District and at least 500 employees are:

| Economic entity | Location | Number of employees | Main activity |
|---|---|---|---|
| Prachatice Hospital | Prachatice | 500–999 | Health care |
| Rohde & Schwarz závod Vimperk | Vimperk | 500–999 | Manufacture of devices |

== Transport ==
There are no motorways in the district. The most important road is the I/4, which separates from the D4 motorway and leads through the district to the Czech–German border.

== Sights ==
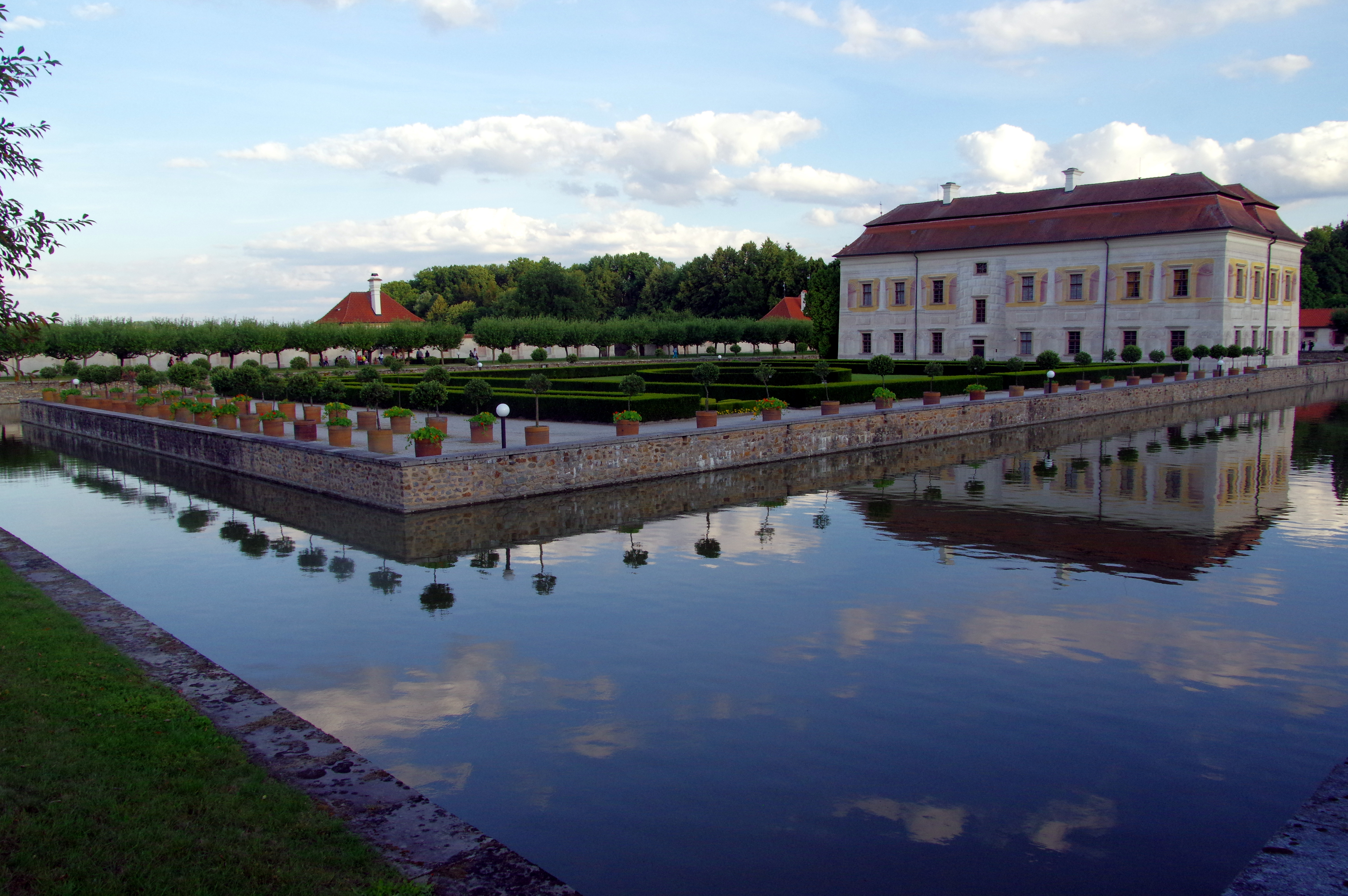
Kratochvíle Castle

The most important monuments in the district, protected as national cultural monuments, are:

- Birthplace of Jan Hus in Husinec
- Kratochvíle Castle
- Vimperk Castle
- Schwarzenberg Canal (partly)
- Prachatice Town Hall

The best-preserved settlements, protected as monument reservations and monument zones, are:

- Prachatice (monument reservation)
- Dobrá (monument reservation)
- Stachy (monument reservation)
- Vodice (monument reservation)
- Volary (monument reservation)
- Husinec
- Netolice
- Vimperk
- Vlachovo Březí
- Stachy-Chalupy
- Lažiště
- Libotyně
- Mahouš
- Příslop
- Třešňový Újezdec
- Vitějovice
- Zvěřetice

The most visited tourist destination is the Kratochvíle Castle.
