= Pěčnov =

- Municipality
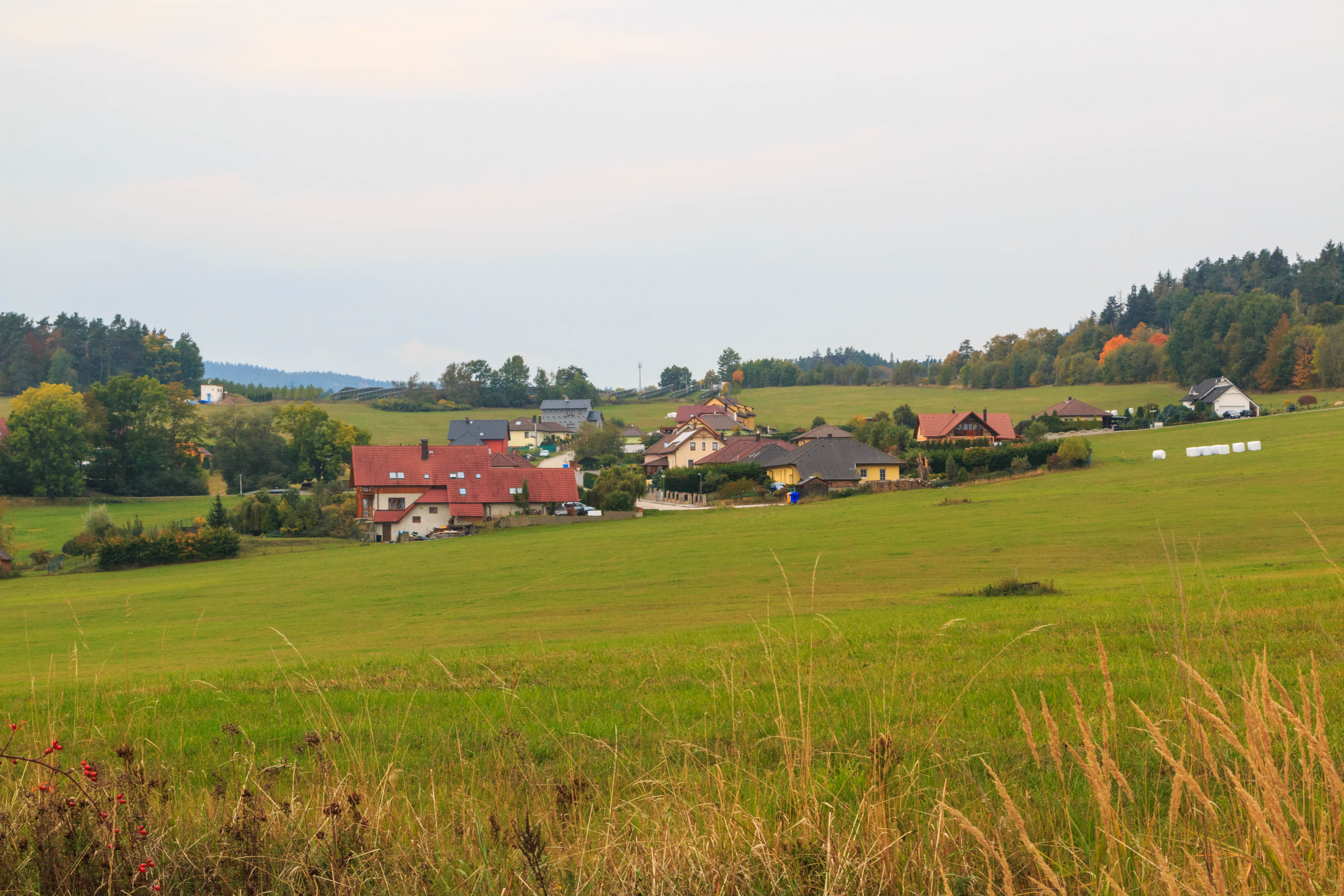
- View from the northeast

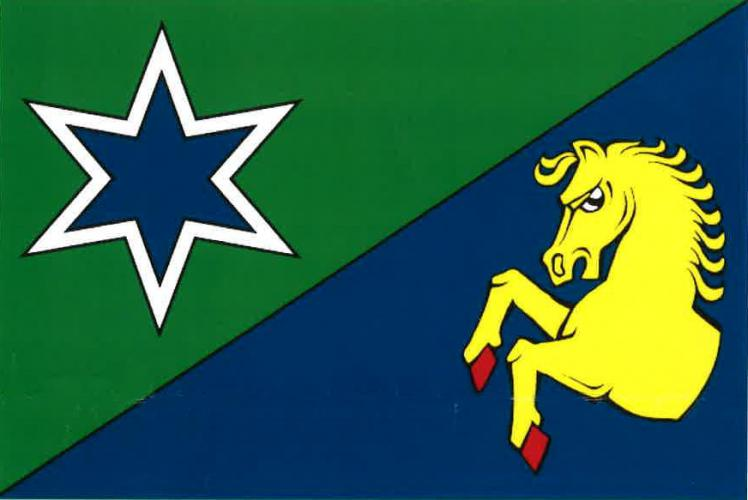
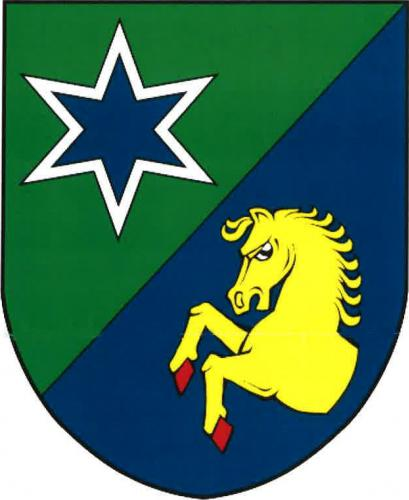
- Flag Coat of arms

- Location in the Czech Republic
- Coordinates: 49°3′11″N 13°56′31″E
- Country: Czech Republic
- Region: South Bohemian
- District: Prachatice
- First mentioned: 1435

Area
  - Total: 1.98 km^{2} (0.76 sq mi)
- Elevation: 600 m (2,000 ft)

Population (2026-01-01)
  - Total: 175
  - Density: 88.4/km^{2} (229/sq mi)
- Time zone: UTC+1 (CET)
  - Summer (DST): UTC+2 (CEST)
- Postal code: 384 21
- Website: www.pecnov.cz

Pěčnov is a municipality and village in Prachatice District in the South Bohemian Region of the Czech Republic. It has about 200 inhabitants.

Pěčnov lies approximately 7 kilometres (4 mi) north-west of Prachatice, 40 km (25 mi) west of České Budějovice, and 120 km (75 mi) south of Prague.

== Demographics ==
Historical population
Year	Pop.	±%
1869	156	—
1880	137	−12.2%
1890	159	+16.1%
1900	157	−1.3%
1910	153	−2.5%
1921	149	−2.6%
1930	139	−6.7%
1950	99	−28.8%
1961	104	+5.1%
1970	80	−23.1%
1980	47	−41.2%
1991	43	−8.5%
2001	53	+23.3%
2011	125	+135.8%
2021	146	+16.8%
Source: Censuses
