= Chroboly =

- Municipality
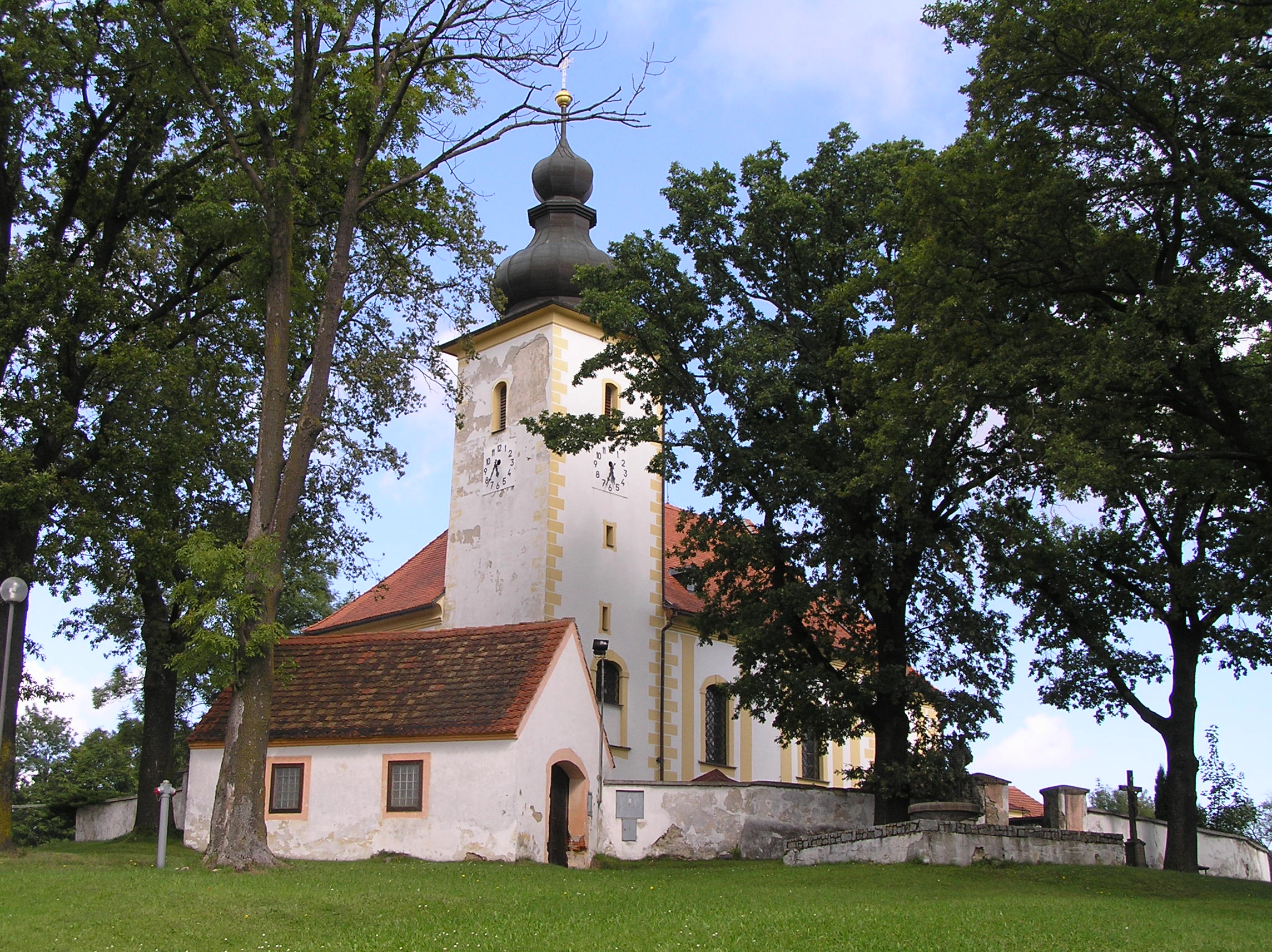
- Church of the Nativity of the Virgin Mary

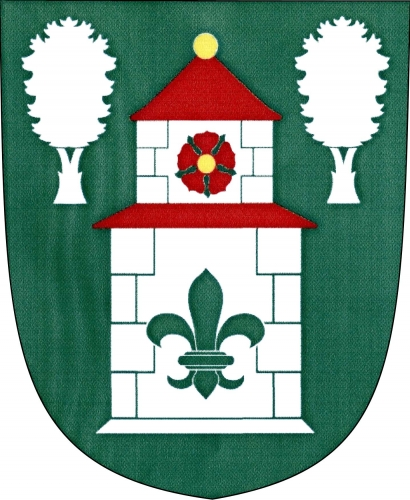
- Flag Coat of arms

- Location in the Czech Republic
- Coordinates: 48°57′24″N 14°4′1″E
- Country: Czech Republic
- Region: South Bohemian
- District: Prachatice
- First mentioned: 1317

Area
  - Total: 34.68 km^{2} (13.39 sq mi)
- Elevation: 758 m (2,487 ft)

Population (2026-01-01)
  - Total: 599
  - Density: 17.3/km^{2} (44.7/sq mi)
- Time zone: UTC+1 (CET)
  - Summer (DST): UTC+2 (CEST)
- Postal codes: 383 01, 384 04
- Website: www.chroboly.cz

Chroboly (German: Chrobold) is a municipality and village in Prachatice District in the South Bohemian Region of the Czech Republic. It has about 600 inhabitants.

Chroboly lies approximately 9 kilometres (6 mi) south-east of Prachatice, 31 km (19 mi) west of České Budějovice, and 129 km (80 mi) south of Prague.

== Administrative division ==
Chroboly consists of seven municipal parts (in brackets population according to the 2021 census):

- Chroboly (340)
- Leptač (65)
- Lučenice (25)
- Ovesné (29)
- Příslop (10)
- Rohanov (16)
- Záhoří (59)

== Demographics ==
Historical population
Year	Pop.	±%
1869	1,513	—
1880	1,450	−4.2%
1890	1,321	−8.9%
1900	1,325	+0.3%
1910	1,334	+0.7%
1921	1,346	+0.9%
1930	1,441	+7.1%
1950	694	−51.8%
1961	516	−25.6%
1970	459	−11.0%
1980	466	+1.5%
1991	427	−8.4%
2001	444	+4.0%
2011	456	+2.7%
2021	544	+19.3%
Source: Censuses
