= Zábrdí =

- Municipality
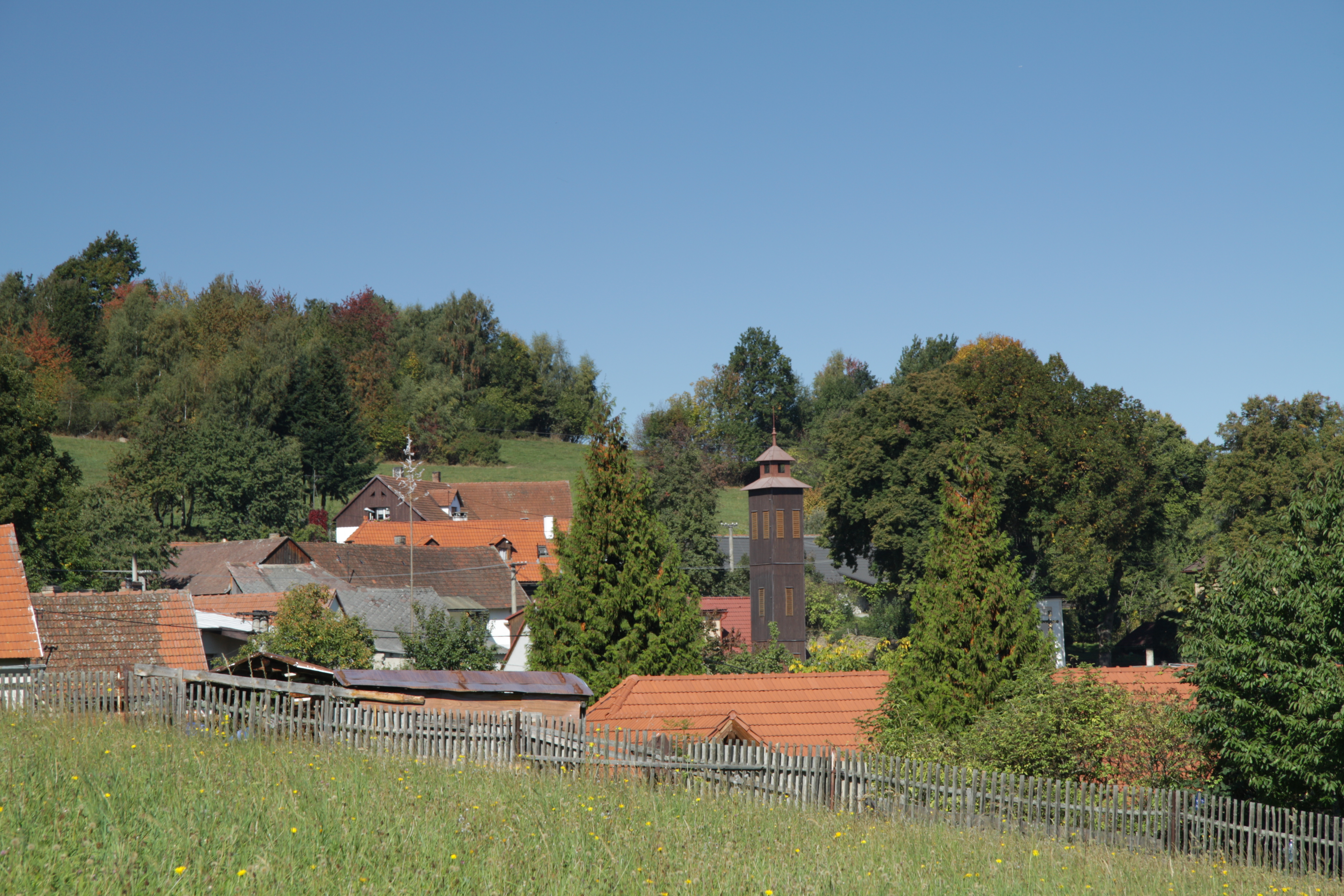
- General view

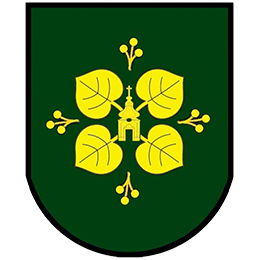
- Coat of arms

- Location in the Czech Republic
- Coordinates: 49°1′41″N 13°56′22″E
- Country: Czech Republic
- Region: South Bohemian
- District: Prachatice
- First mentioned: 1359

Area
  - Total: 4.90 km^{2} (1.89 sq mi)
- Elevation: 642 m (2,106 ft)

Population (2026-01-01)
  - Total: 67
  - Density: 14/km^{2} (35/sq mi)
- Time zone: UTC+1 (CET)
  - Summer (DST): UTC+2 (CEST)
- Postal code: 384 21
- Website: www.zabrdi.cz

Zábrdí is a municipality and village in Prachatice District in the South Bohemian Region of the Czech Republic. It has about 70 inhabitants.

Zábrdí lies approximately 5 kilometres (3 mi) west of Prachatice, 40 km (25 mi) west of České Budějovice, and 124 km (77 mi) south of Prague.

== Demographics ==
Historical population
Year	Pop.	±%
1869	280	—
1880	295	+5.4%
1890	232	−21.4%
1900	234	+0.9%
1910	244	+4.3%
1921	248	+1.6%
1930	211	−14.9%
1950	145	−31.3%
1961	144	−0.7%
1970	120	−16.7%
1980	88	−26.7%
1991	51	−42.0%
2001	55	+7.8%
2011	57	+3.6%
2021	59	+3.5%
Source: Censuses
