= Nebahovy =

- Municipality
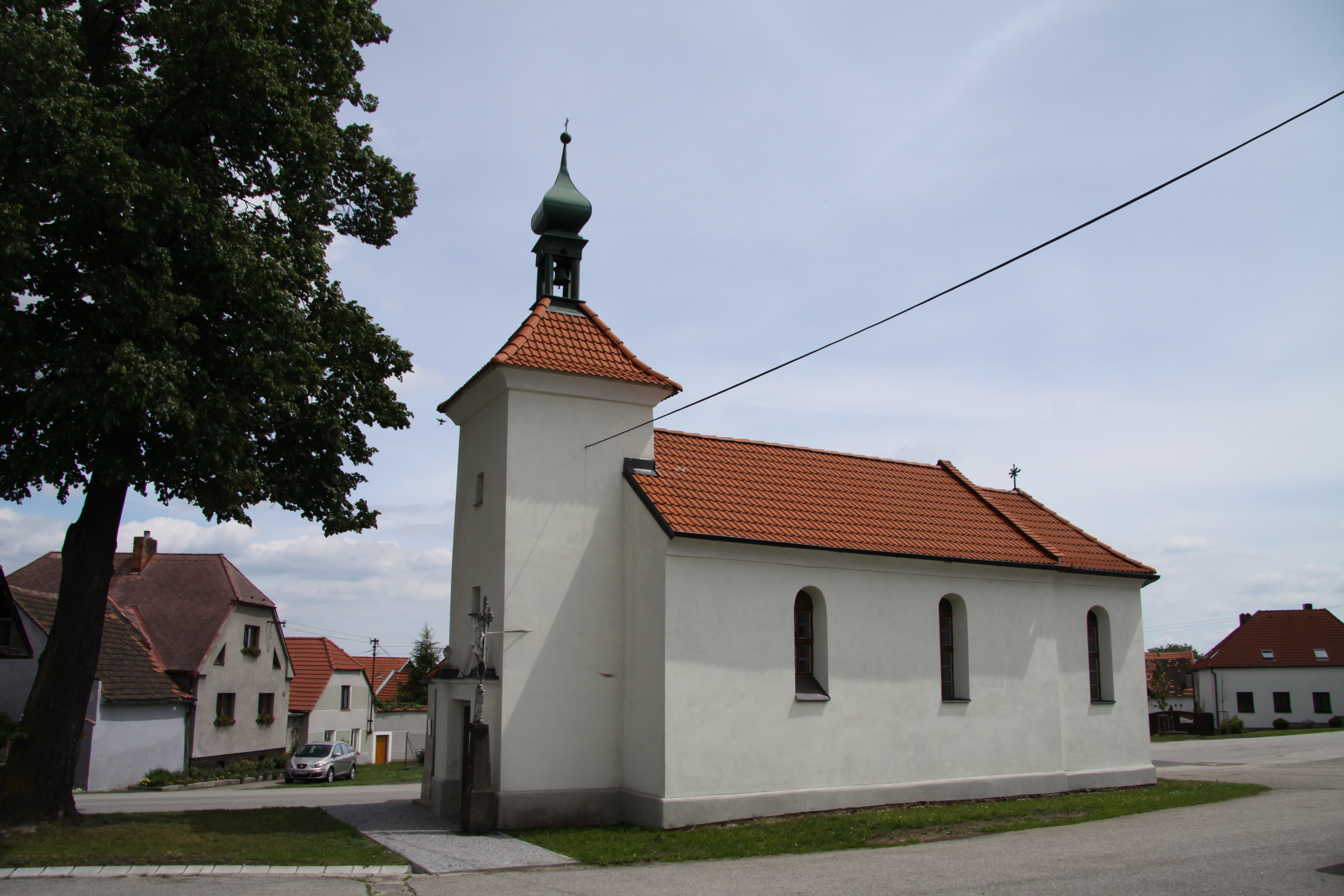
- Chapel of the Coronation of the Virgin Mary

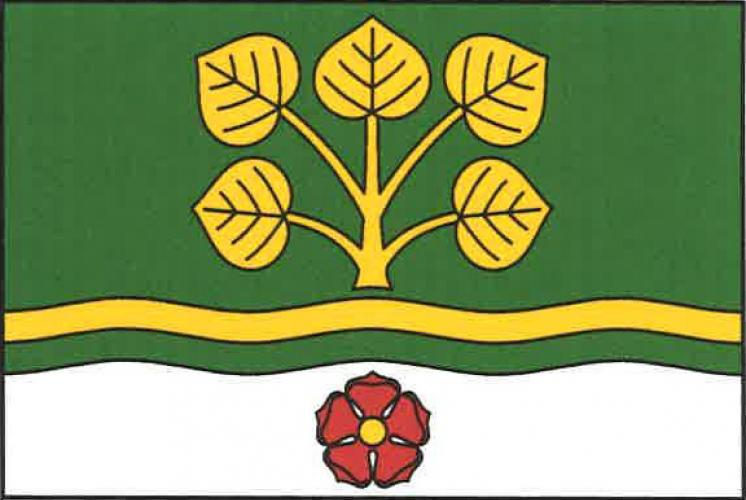
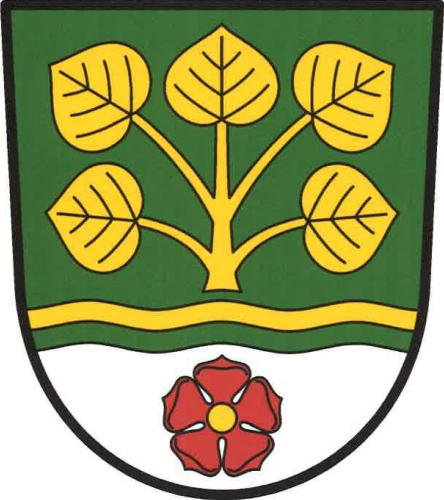
- Flag Coat of arms

- Location in the Czech Republic
- Coordinates: 49°0′21″N 14°3′8″E
- Country: Czech Republic
- Region: South Bohemian
- District: Prachatice
- First mentioned: 1317

Area
  - Total: 16.28 km^{2} (6.29 sq mi)
- Elevation: 745 m (2,444 ft)

Population (2026-01-01)
  - Total: 633
  - Density: 38.9/km^{2} (101/sq mi)
- Time zone: UTC+1 (CET)
  - Summer (DST): UTC+2 (CEST)
- Postal codes: 383 01, 384 01
- Website: www.nebahovy.cz

Nebahovy is a municipality and village in Prachatice District in the South Bohemian Region of the Czech Republic. It has about 600 inhabitants.

Nebahovy lies approximately 5 kilometres (3 mi) east of Prachatice, 31 km (19 mi) west of České Budějovice, and 123 km (76 mi) south of Prague.

== Administrative division ==
Nebahovy consists of five municipal parts (in brackets population according to the 2021 census):

- Nebahovy (281)
- Jelemek (36)
- Kralovice (50)
- Lažišťka (26)
- Zdenice (198)

== Demographics ==
Historical population
Year	Pop.	±%
1869	1,059	—
1880	1,058	−0.1%
1890	1,036	−2.1%
1900	907	−12.5%
1910	915	+0.9%
1921	844	−7.8%
1930	850	+0.7%
1950	581	−31.6%
1961	593	+2.1%
1970	485	−18.2%
1980	407	−16.1%
1991	360	−11.5%
2001	425	+18.1%
2011	478	+12.5%
2021	591	+23.6%
Source: Censuses
