= Vitějovice =

- Municipality
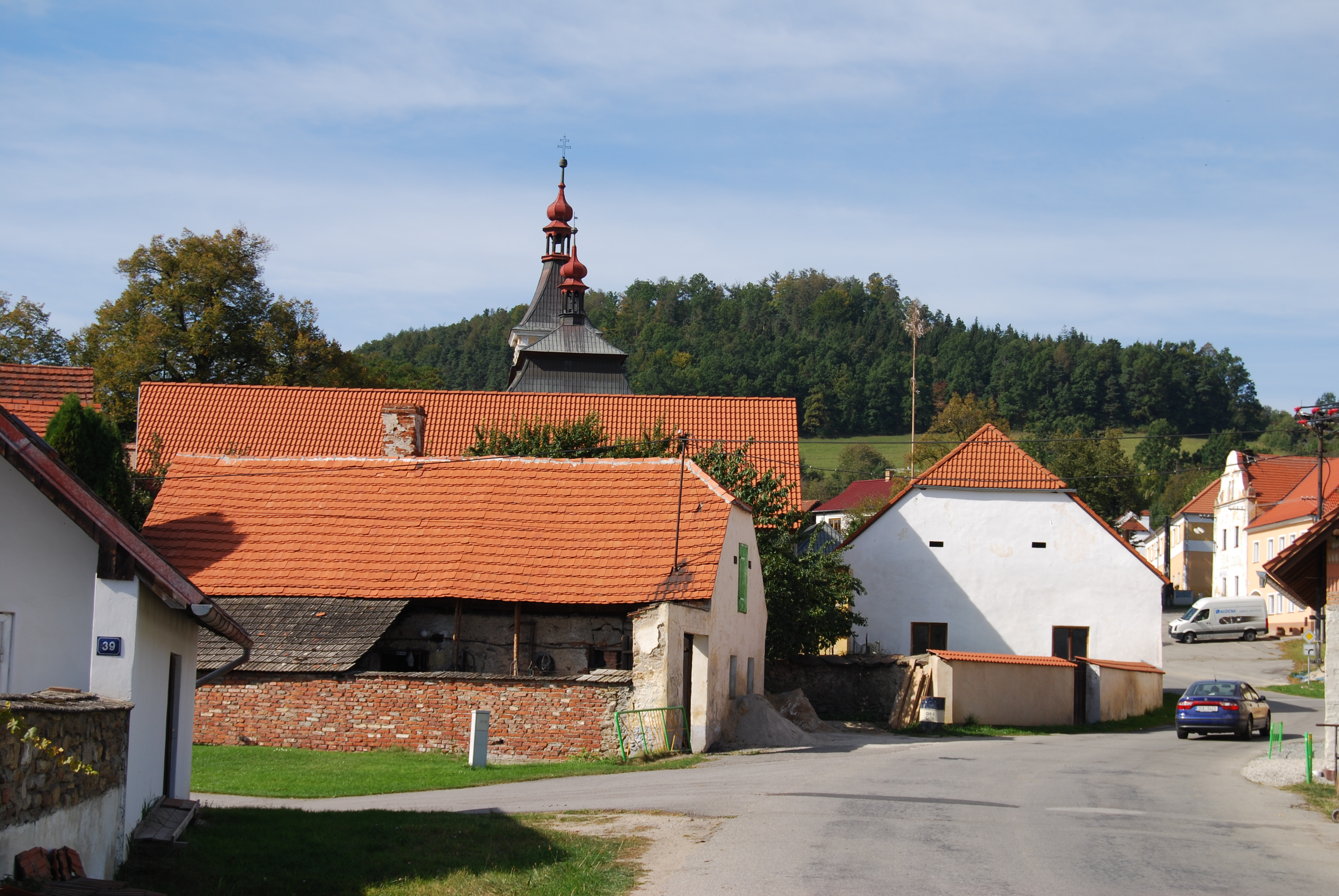
- Centre of Vitějovice

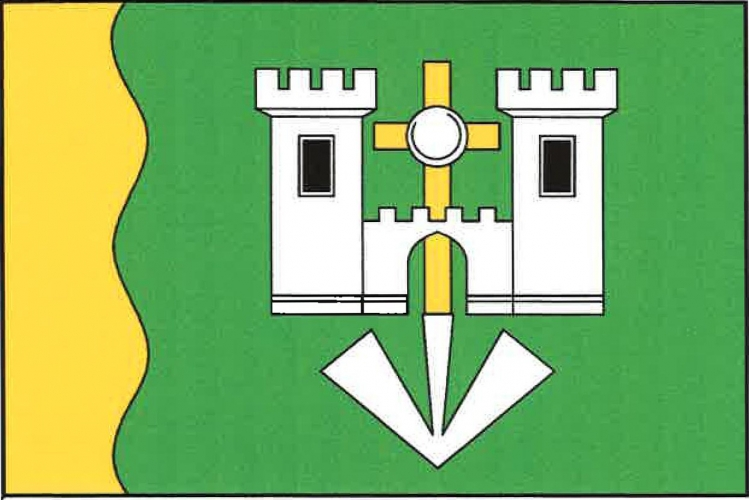
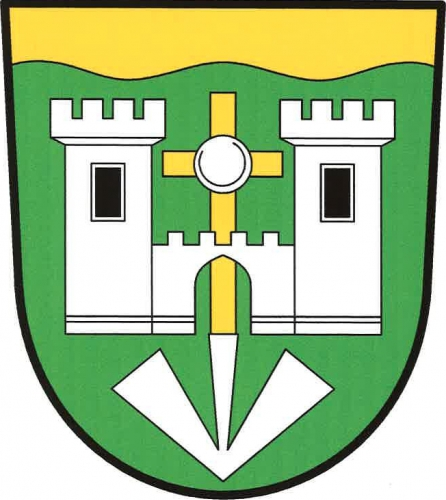
- Flag Coat of arms

- Location in the Czech Republic
- Coordinates: 49°3′53″N 13°49′53″E
- Country: Czech Republic
- Region: South Bohemian
- District: Prachatice
- First mentioned: 1283

Area
  - Total: 11.80 km^{2} (4.56 sq mi)
- Elevation: 509 m (1,670 ft)

Population (2026-01-01)
  - Total: 511
  - Density: 43.3/km^{2} (112/sq mi)
- Time zone: UTC+1 (CET)
  - Summer (DST): UTC+2 (CEST)
- Postal codes: 384 27
- Website: www.vitejovice.cz

Vitějovice is a municipality and village in Prachatice District in the South Bohemian Region of the Czech Republic. It has about 500 inhabitants.

Vitějovice lies approximately 7 kilometres (4 mi) north-east of Prachatice, 31 km (19 mi) west of České Budějovice, and 119 km (74 mi) south of Prague.

== Demographics ==
Historical population
Year	Pop.	±%
1869	648	—
1880	777	+19.9%
1890	730	−6.0%
1900	694	−4.9%
1910	717	+3.3%
1921	694	−3.2%
1930	699	+0.7%
1950	543	−22.3%
1961	581	+7.0%
1970	532	−8.4%
1980	500	−6.0%
1991	458	−8.4%
2001	428	−6.6%
2011	504	+17.8%
2021	528	+4.8%
Source: Censuses
