= Tvrzice =

- Municipality
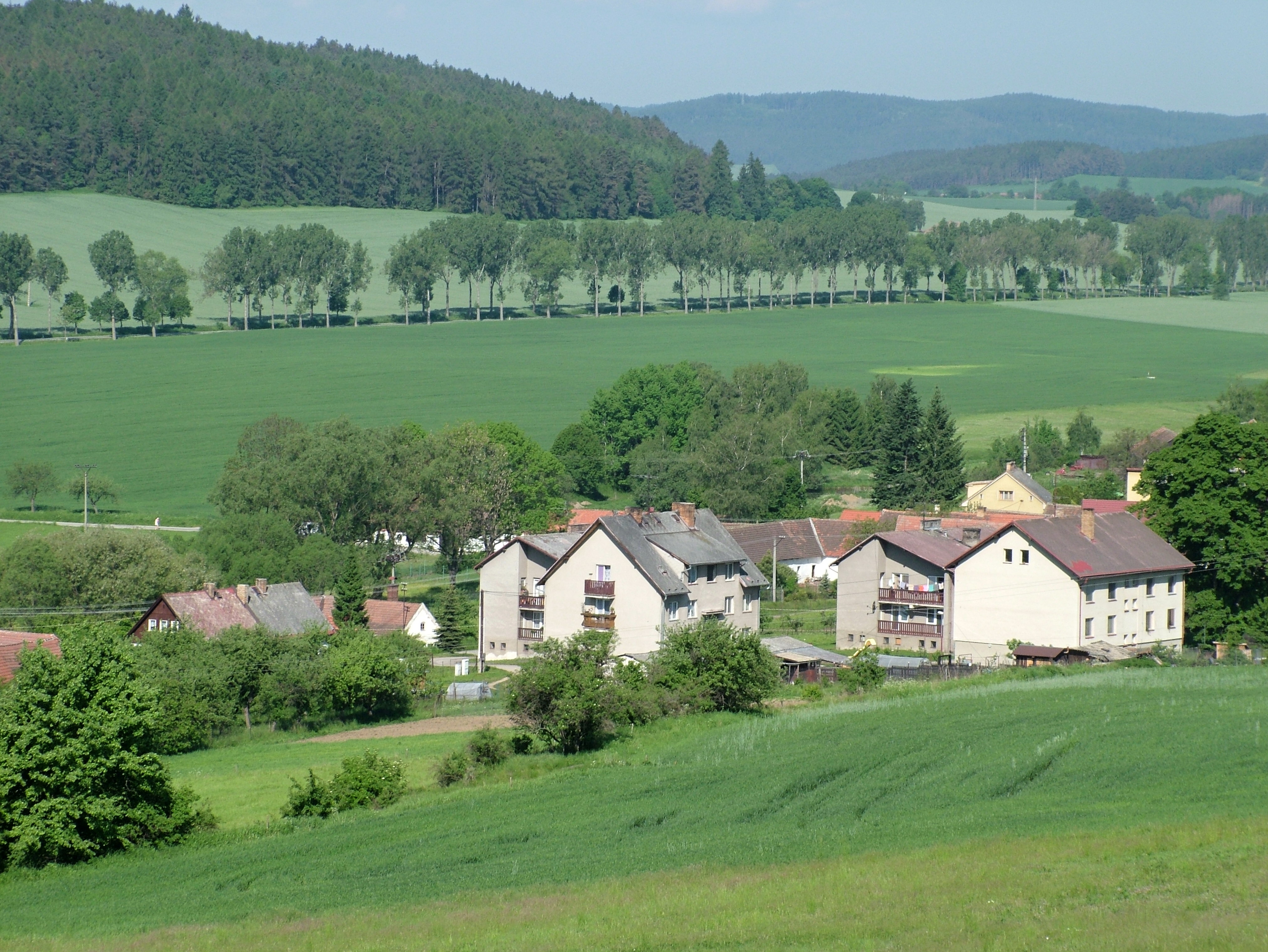
- Houses in Tvrzice

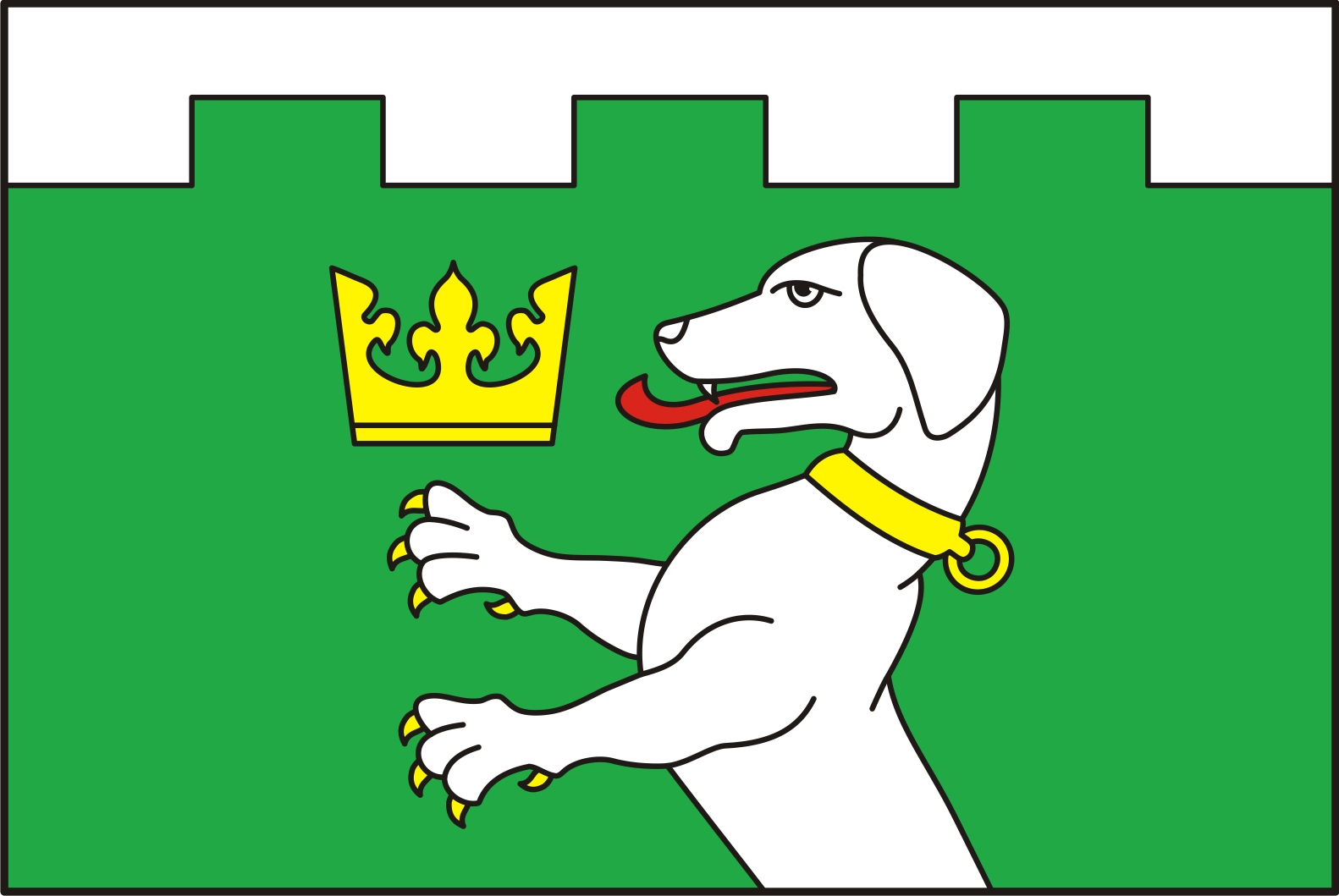
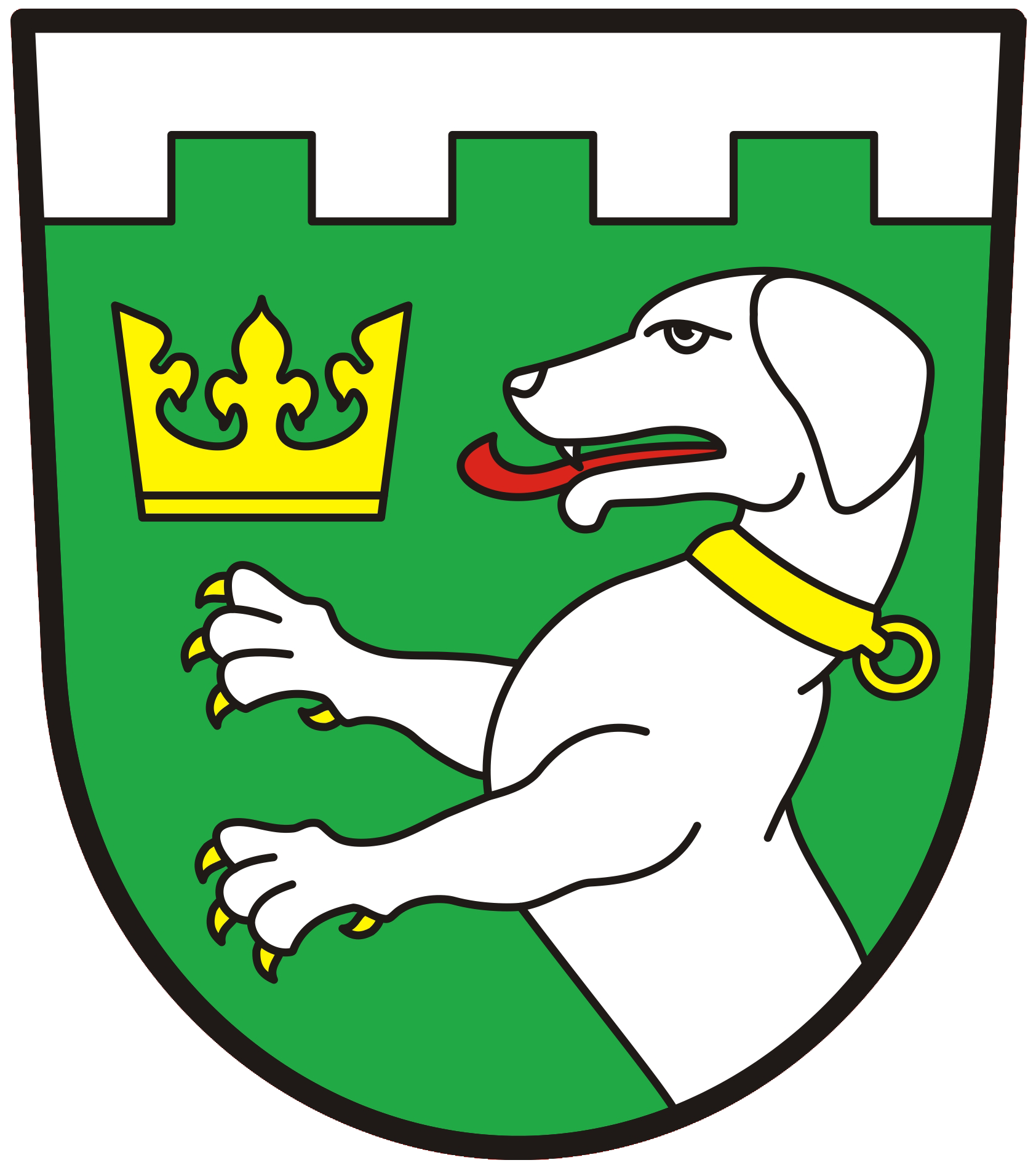
- Flag Coat of arms

- Location in the Czech Republic
- Coordinates: 49°7′19″N 13°58′2″E
- Country: Czech Republic
- Region: South Bohemian
- District: Prachatice
- First mentioned: 1315

Area
  - Total: 3.17 km^{2} (1.22 sq mi)
- Elevation: 509 m (1,670 ft)

Population (2026-01-01)
  - Total: 131
  - Density: 41.3/km^{2} (107/sq mi)
- Time zone: UTC+1 (CET)
  - Summer (DST): UTC+2 (CEST)
- Postal code: 384 22
- Website: tvrzice.cz

Tvrzice is a municipality and village in Prachatice District in the South Bohemian Region of the Czech Republic. It has about 100 inhabitants.

Tvrzice lies approximately 12 kilometres (7 mi) north of Prachatice, 40 km (25 mi) north-west of České Budějovice, and 113 km (70 mi) south of Prague.

== Demographics ==
Historical population
Year	Pop.	±%
1869	204	—
1880	241	+18.1%
1890	254	+5.4%
1900	233	−8.3%
1910	241	+3.4%
1921	246	+2.1%
1930	208	−15.4%
1950	149	−28.4%
1961	134	−10.1%
1970	109	−18.7%
1980	136	+24.8%
1991	112	−17.6%
2001	117	+4.5%
2011	124	+6.0%
2021	129	+4.0%
Source: Censuses
