= Chlumany =

- Municipality
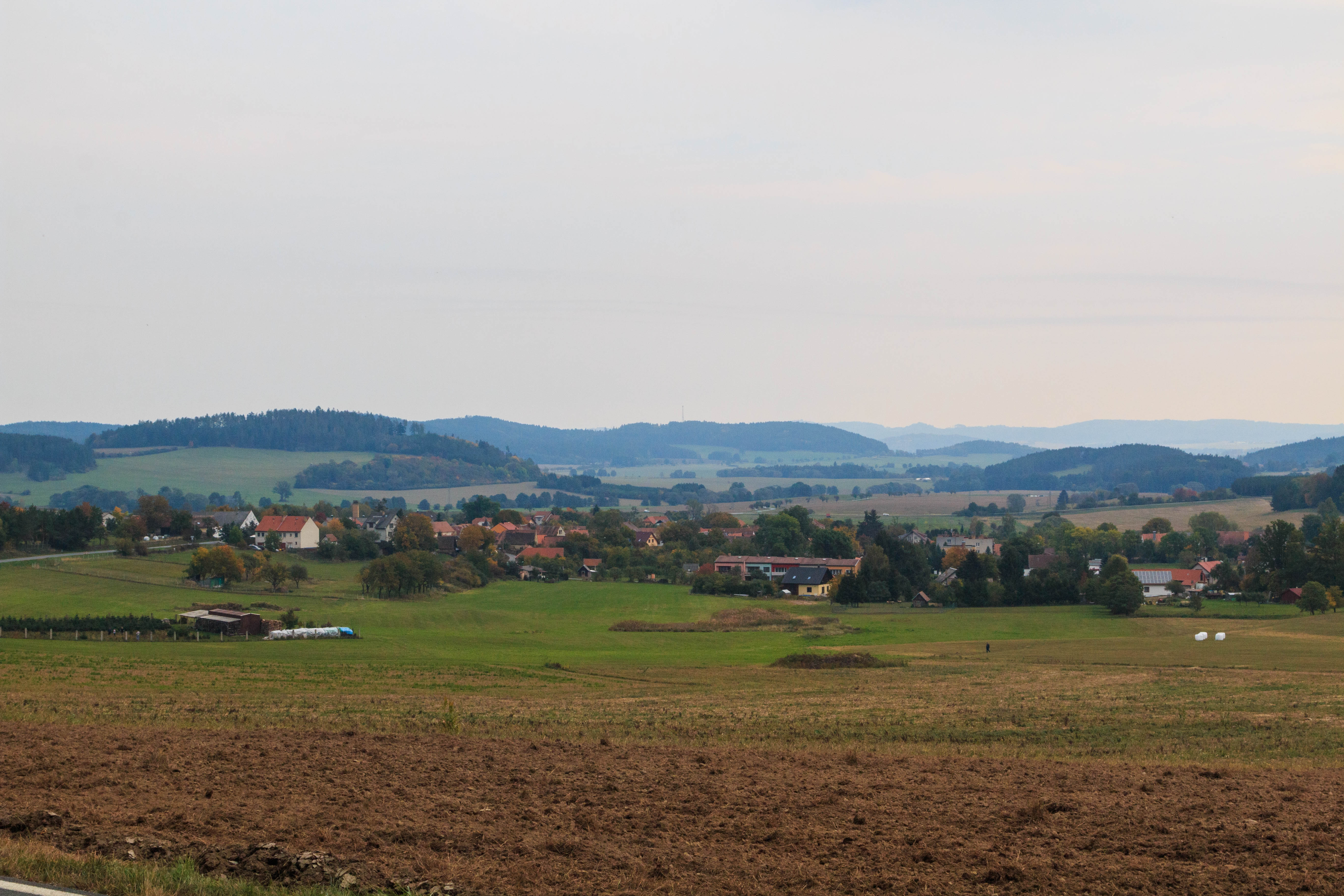
- General view

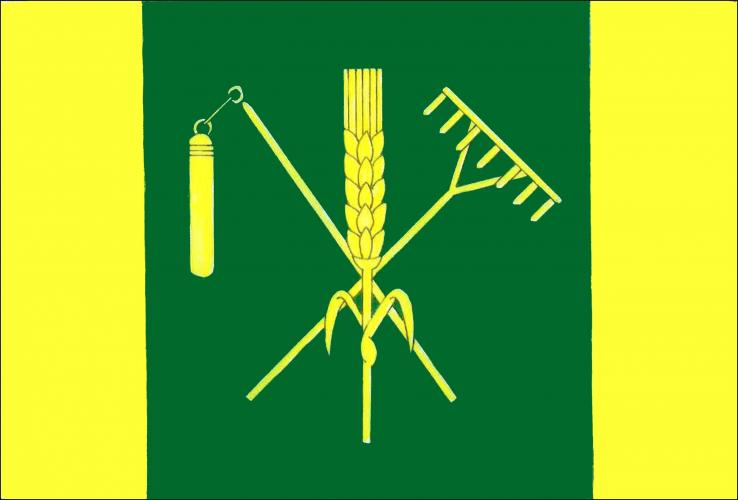
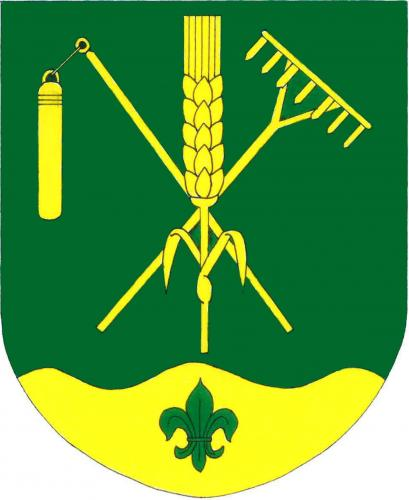
- Flag Coat of arms

- Location in the Czech Republic
- Coordinates: 49°4′0″N 13°57′55″E
- Country: Czech Republic
- Region: South Bohemian
- District: Prachatice
- First mentioned: 1383

Area
  - Total: 5.57 km^{2} (2.15 sq mi)
- Elevation: 528 m (1,732 ft)

Population (2026-01-01)
  - Total: 373
  - Density: 67.0/km^{2} (173/sq mi)
- Time zone: UTC+1 (CET)
  - Summer (DST): UTC+2 (CEST)
- Postal code: 384 22
- Website: www.chlumany.cz

Chlumany is a municipality and village in Prachatice District in the South Bohemian Region of the Czech Republic. It has about 400 inhabitants.

Chlumany lies approximately 7 kilometres (4 mi) north of Prachatice, 39 km (24 mi) west of České Budějovice, and 119 km (74 mi) south of Prague.

== Demographics ==
Historical population
Year	Pop.	±%
1869	392	—
1880	358	−8.7%
1890	362	+1.1%
1900	379	+4.7%
1910	386	+1.8%
1921	389	+0.8%
1930	365	−6.2%
1950	323	−11.5%
1961	266	−17.6%
1970	243	−8.6%
1980	267	+9.9%
1991	296	+10.9%
2001	304	+2.7%
2011	334	+9.9%
2021	343	+2.7%
Source: Censuses
