= Lužice (Prachatice District) =

- Municipality
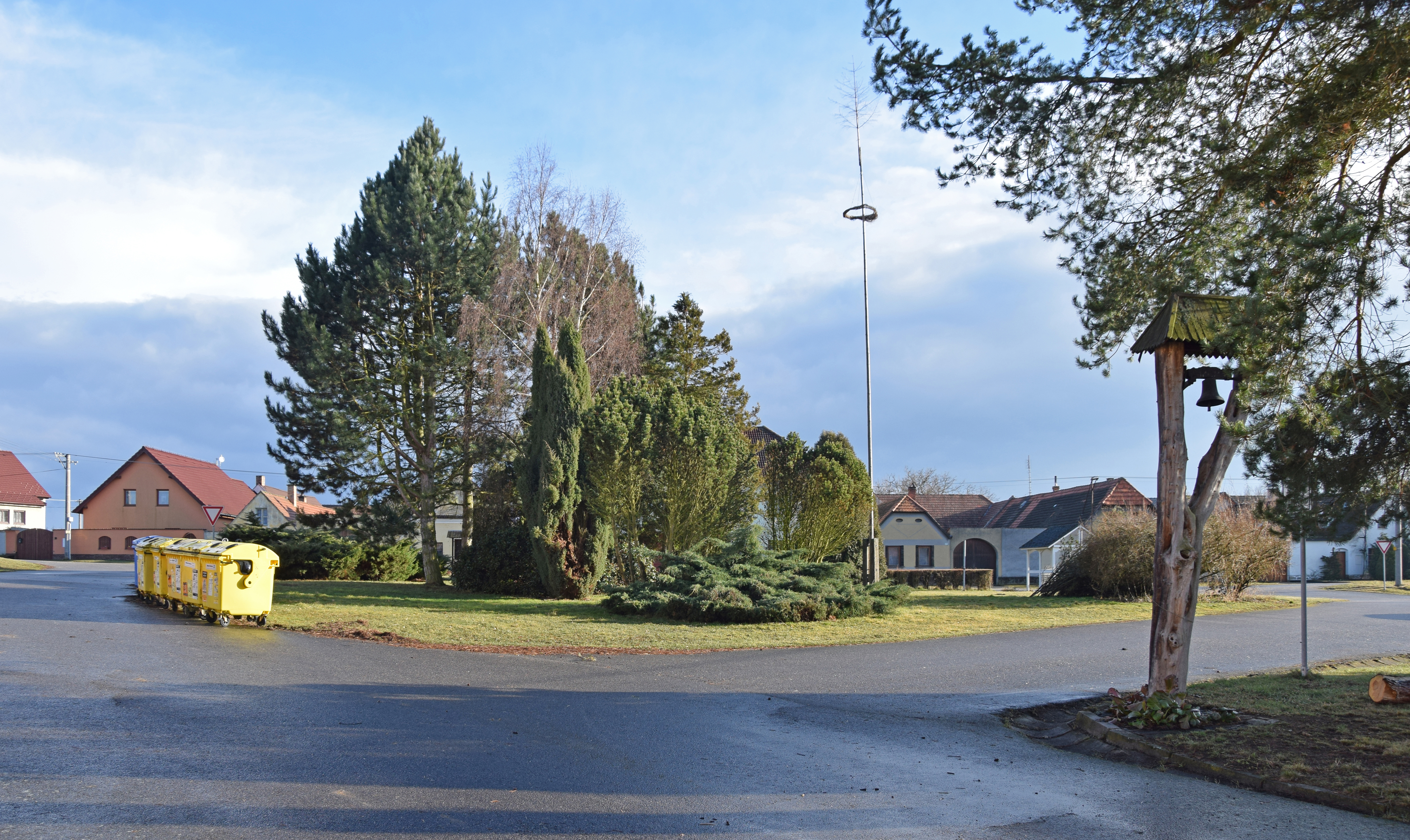
- Centre of Lužice

- Location in the Czech Republic
- Coordinates: 49°1′53″N 14°12′18″E
- Country: Czech Republic
- Region: South Bohemian
- District: Prachatice
- First mentioned: 1400

Area
  - Total: 3.19 km^{2} (1.23 sq mi)
- Elevation: 460 m (1,510 ft)

Population (2026-01-01)
  - Total: 45
  - Density: 14/km^{2} (37/sq mi)
- Time zone: UTC+1 (CET)
  - Summer (DST): UTC+2 (CEST)
- Postal code: 384 11
- Website: obec-luzice.cz

Lužice is a municipality and village in Prachatice District in the South Bohemian Region of the Czech Republic. It has about 50 inhabitants.

Lužice lies approximately 16 kilometres (10 mi) east of Prachatice, 21 km (13 mi) west of České Budějovice, and 119 km (74 mi) south of Prague.

== Demographics ==
Historical population
Year	Pop.	±%
1869	193	—
1880	165	−14.5%
1890	165	+0.0%
1900	155	−6.1%
1910	117	−24.5%
1921	145	+23.9%
1930	130	−10.3%
1950	79	−39.2%
1961	75	−5.1%
1970	65	−13.3%
1980	56	−13.8%
1991	45	−19.6%
2001	45	+0.0%
2011	39	−13.3%
2021	35	−10.3%
Source: Censuses
