= Bohunice (Prachatice District) =

- Municipality
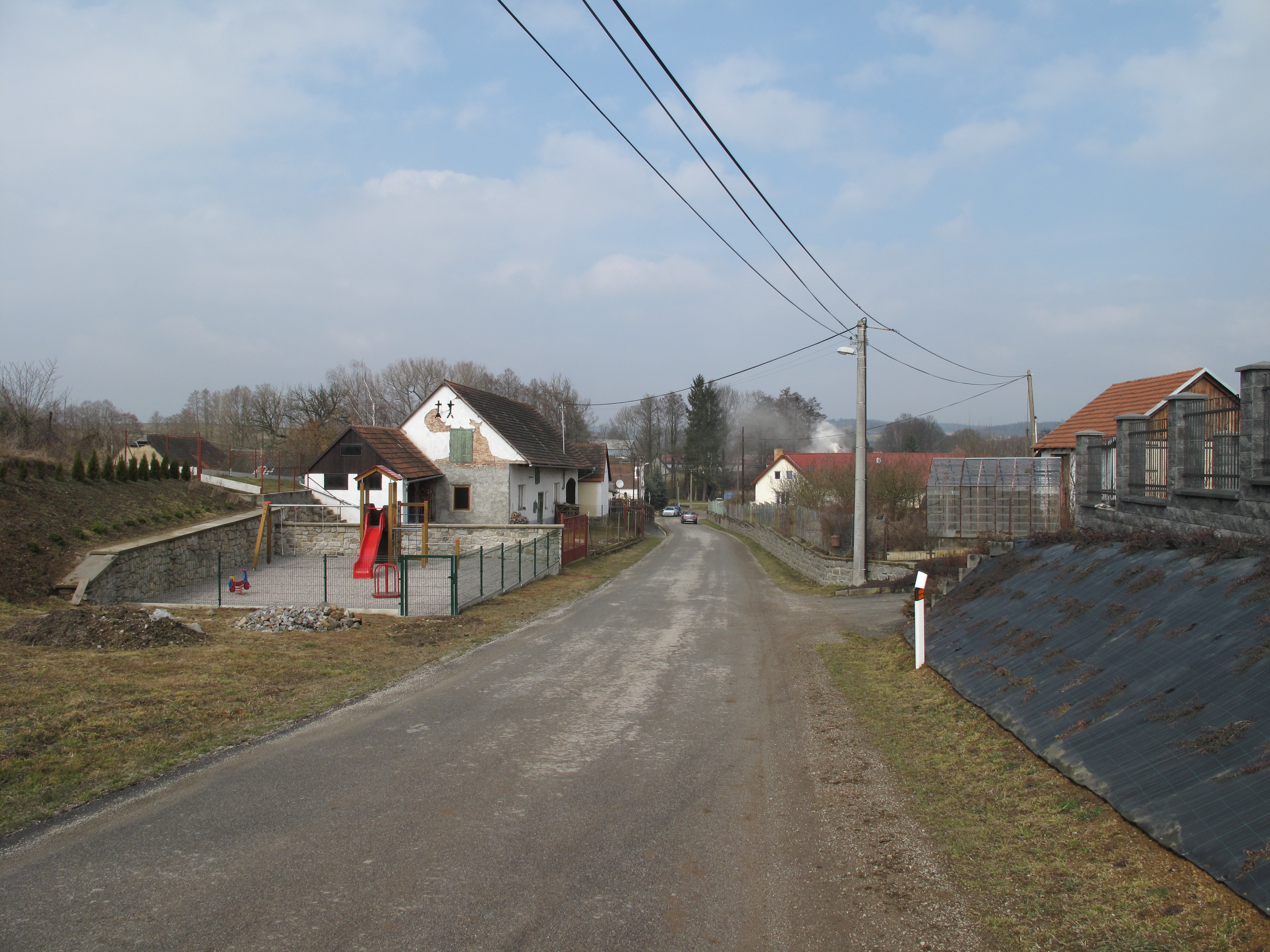
- Road through Bohunice

- Location in the Czech Republic
- Coordinates: 49°7′57″N 13°58′24″E
- Country: Czech Republic
- Region: South Bohemian
- District: Prachatice
- First mentioned: 1315

Area
  - Total: 2.57 km^{2} (0.99 sq mi)
- Elevation: 478 m (1,568 ft)

Population (2026-01-01)
  - Total: 43
  - Density: 17/km^{2} (43/sq mi)
- Time zone: UTC+1 (CET)
  - Summer (DST): UTC+2 (CEST)
- Postal code: 384 22
- Website: www.oubohunice.cz

Bohunice is a municipality and village in Prachatice District in the South Bohemian Region of the Czech Republic. It has about 40 inhabitants.

Bohunice lies approximately 14 kilometres (9 mi) north of Prachatice, 41 km (25 mi) north-west of České Budějovice, and 111 km (69 mi) south of Prague.

== Demographics ==
Historical population
| Year | Pop. | ±% |
|---|---|---|
| 1869 | 161 | — |
| 1880 | 184 | +14.3% |
| 1890 | 186 | +1.1% |
| 1900 | 193 | +3.8% |
| 1910 | 195 | +1.0% |
| 1921 | 175 | −10.3% |
| 1930 | 177 | +1.1% |
| 1950 | 120 | −32.2% |
| 1961 | 107 | −10.8% |
| 1970 | 92 | −14.0% |
| 1980 | 77 | −16.3% |
| 1991 | 60 | −22.1% |
| 2001 | 45 | −25.0% |
| 2011 | 51 | +13.3% |
| 2021 | 45 | −11.8% |
Source: Censuses
