= Lažiště =

- Municipality
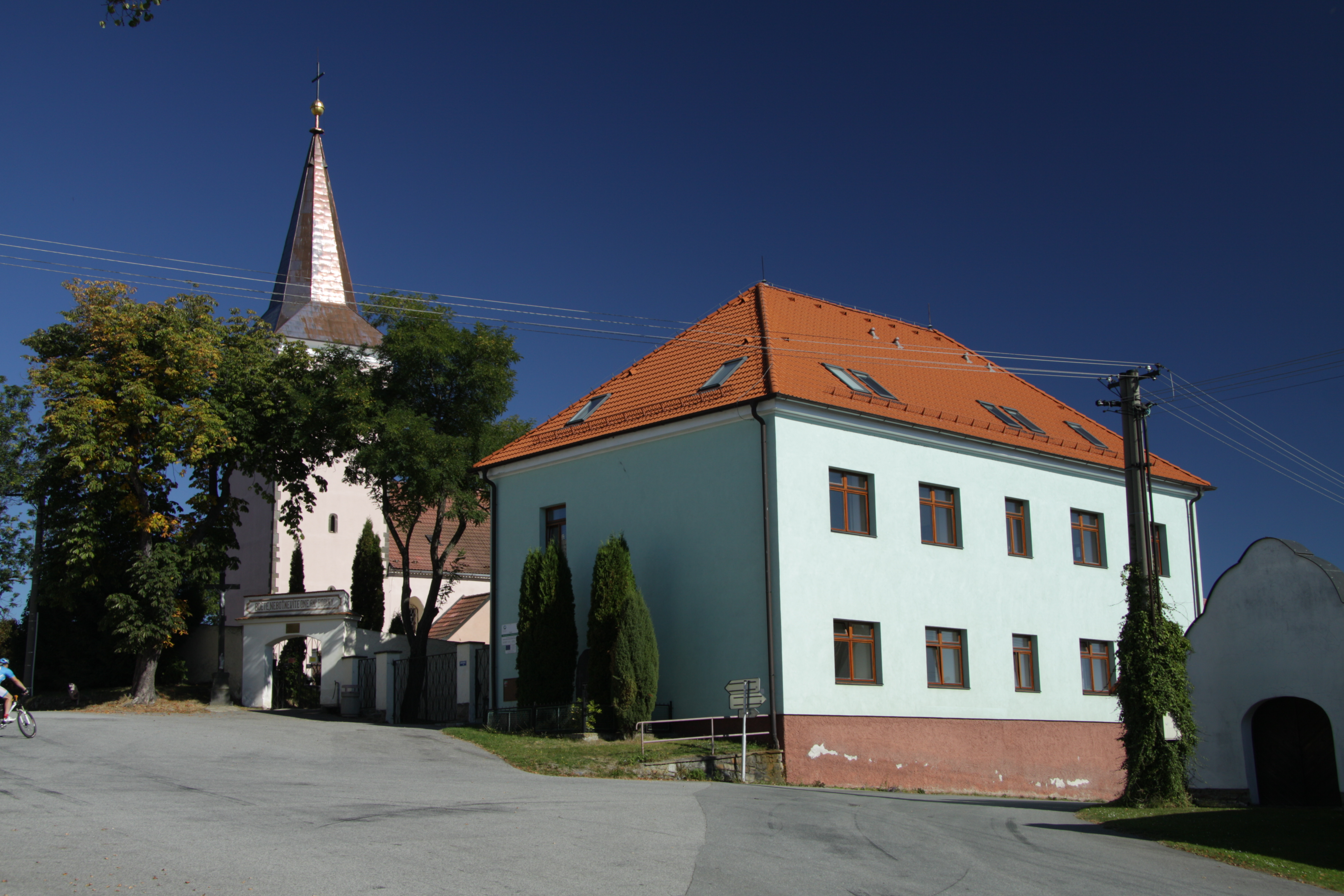
- Centre of Lažiště

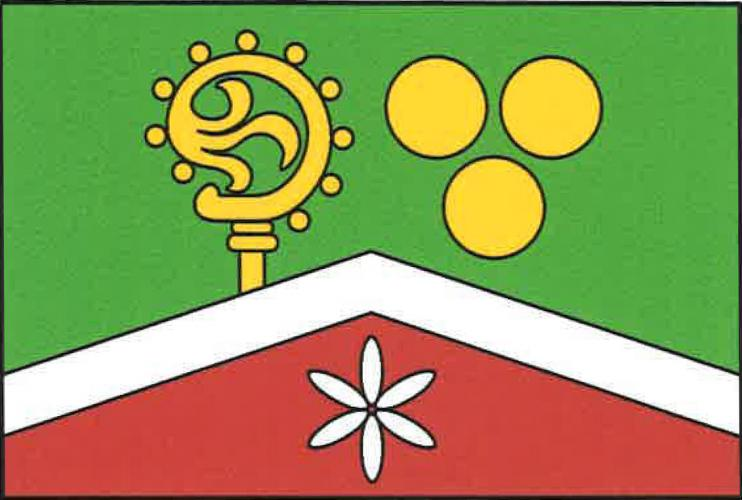
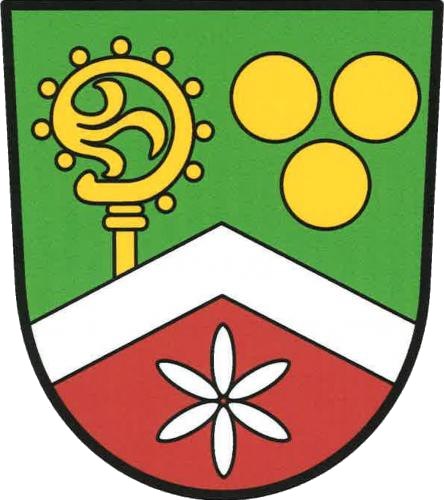
- Flag Coat of arms

- Location in the Czech Republic
- Coordinates: 49°2′16″N 13°55′40″E
- Country: Czech Republic
- Region: South Bohemian
- District: Prachatice
- First mentioned: 1352

Area
  - Total: 4.27 km^{2} (1.65 sq mi)
- Elevation: 663 m (2,175 ft)

Population (2026-01-01)
  - Total: 308
  - Density: 72.1/km^{2} (187/sq mi)
- Time zone: UTC+1 (CET)
  - Summer (DST): UTC+2 (CEST)
- Postal code: 384 32
- Website: www.laziste.cz

Lažiště is a municipality and village in Prachatice District in the South Bohemian Region of the Czech Republic. It has about 300 inhabitants.

Lažiště lies approximately 7 kilometres (4 mi) north-west of Prachatice, 42 km (26 mi) west of České Budějovice, and 122 km (76 mi) south of Prague.

== Demographics ==
Historical population
Year	Pop.	±%
1869	360	—
1880	377	+4.7%
1890	401	+6.4%
1900	398	−0.7%
1910	369	−7.3%
1921	396	+7.3%
1930	382	−3.5%
1950	291	−23.8%
1961	268	−7.9%
1970	255	−4.9%
1980	287	+12.5%
1991	308	+7.3%
2001	316	+2.6%
2011	293	−7.3%
2021	292	−0.3%
Source: Censuses
