= Žárovná =

- Municipality
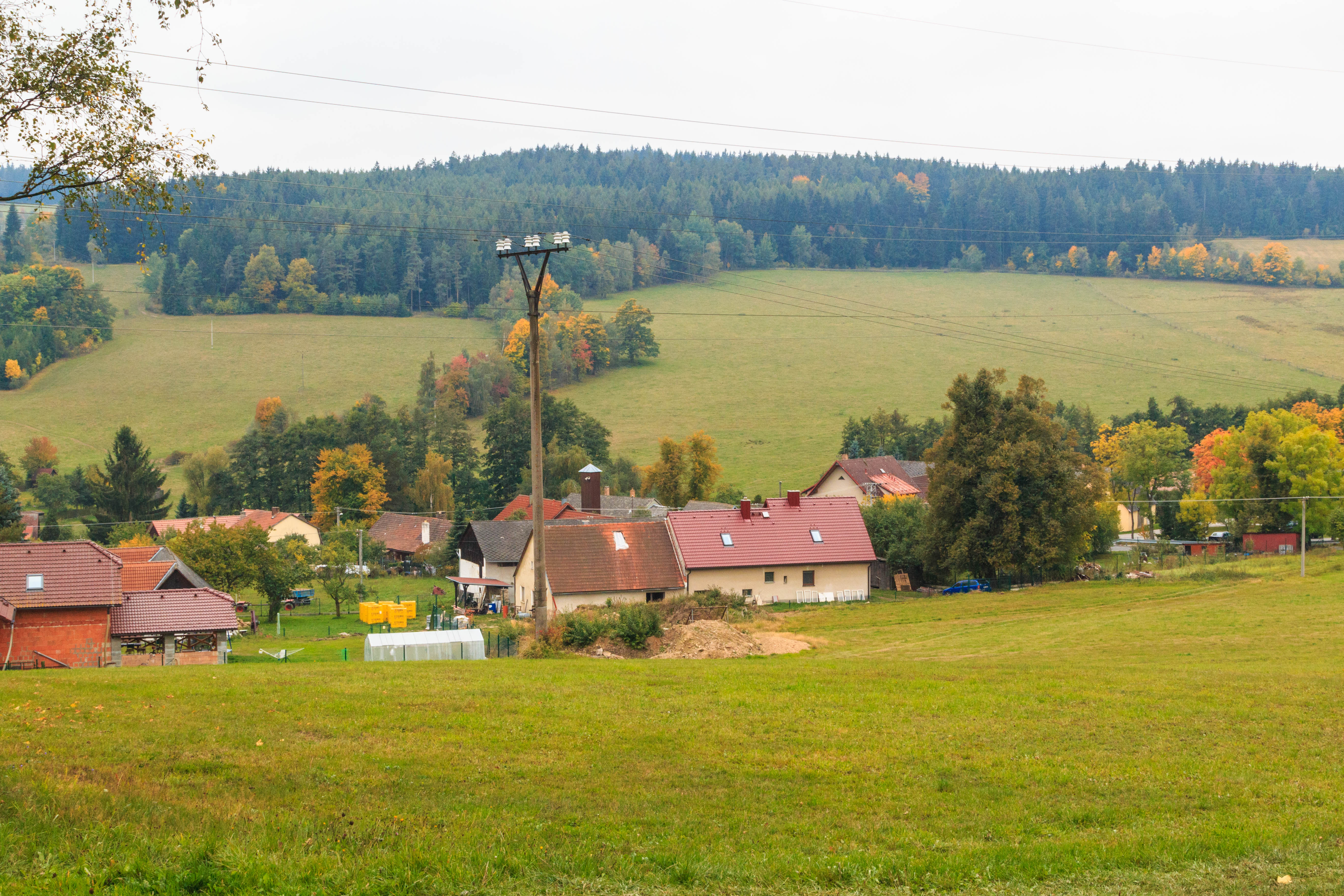
- View from the north

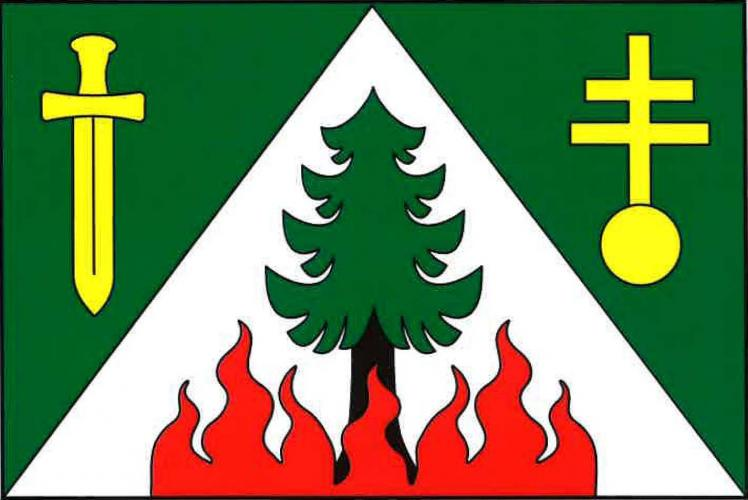
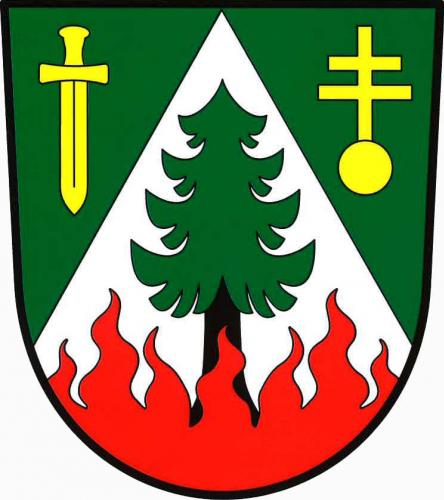
- Flag Coat of arms

- Location in the Czech Republic
- Coordinates: 49°2′47″N 13°53′58″E
- Country: Czech Republic
- Region: South Bohemian
- District: Prachatice
- First mentioned: 1394

Area
  - Total: 2.42 km^{2} (0.93 sq mi)
- Elevation: 725 m (2,379 ft)

Population (2026-01-01)
  - Total: 114
  - Density: 47.1/km^{2} (122/sq mi)
- Time zone: UTC+1 (CET)
  - Summer (DST): UTC+2 (CEST)
- Postal code: 383 01
- Website: www.zarovna.cz

Žárovná is a municipality and village in Prachatice District in the South Bohemian Region of the Czech Republic. It has about 100 inhabitants.

Žárovná lies approximately 9 kilometres (6 mi) north-west of Prachatice, 44 km (27 mi) west of České Budějovice, and 121 km (75 mi) south of Prague.

== Demographics ==
Historical population
Year	Pop.	±%
1869	201	—
1880	178	−11.4%
1890	188	+5.6%
1900	183	−2.7%
1910	183	+0.0%
1921	186	+1.6%
1930	183	−1.6%
1950	111	−39.3%
1961	128	+15.3%
1970	125	−2.3%
1980	114	−8.8%
1991	94	−17.5%
2001	102	+8.5%
2011	109	+6.9%
2021	115	+5.5%
Source: Censuses
