= Žernovice =

- Municipality
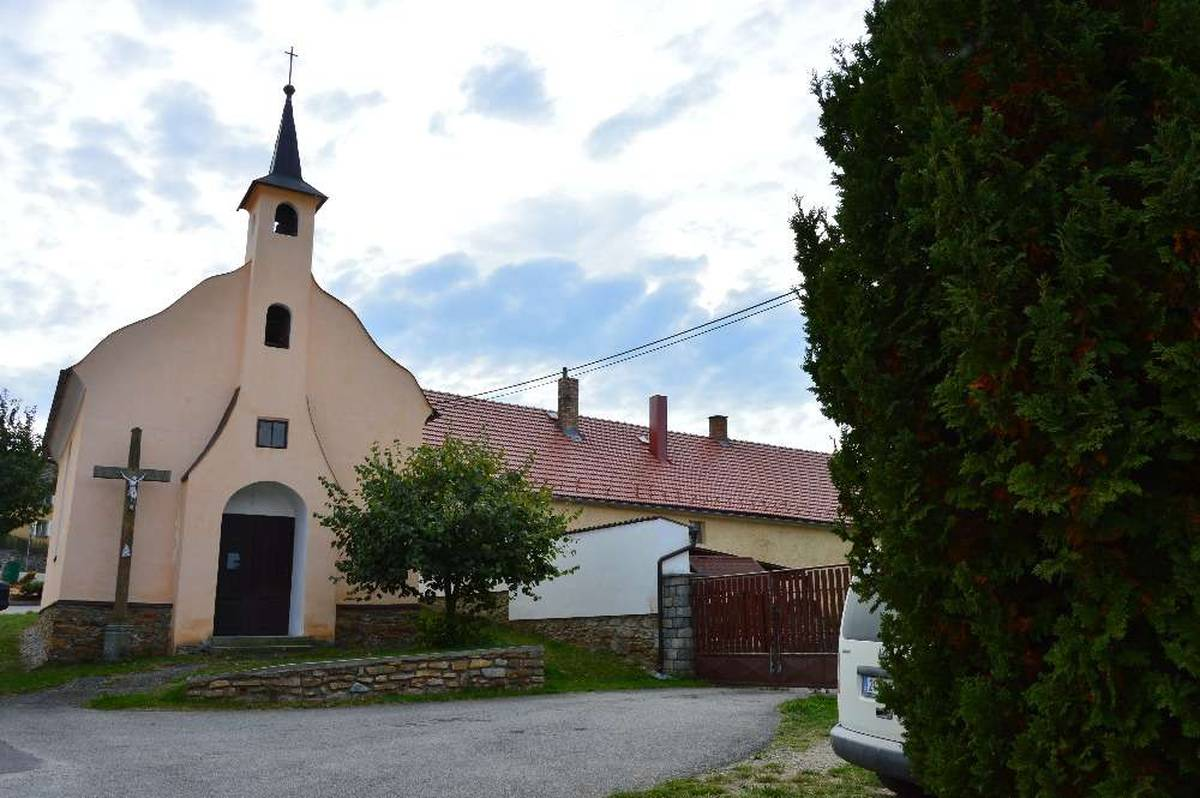
- Chapel of Saint John of Nepomuk

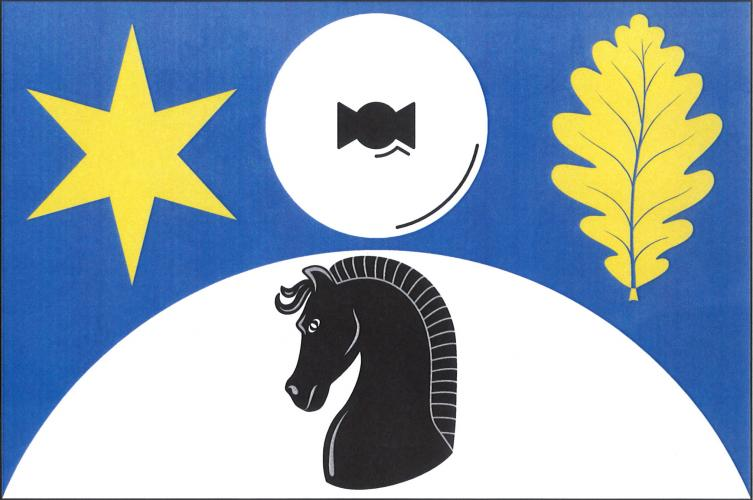
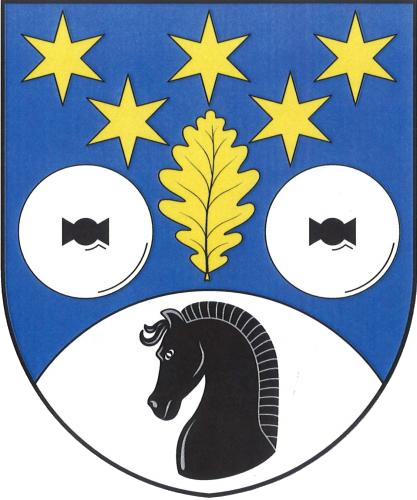
- Flag Coat of arms

- Location in the Czech Republic
- Coordinates: 49°1′43″N 14°2′22″E
- Country: Czech Republic
- Region: South Bohemian
- District: Prachatice
- First mentioned: 1334

Area
  - Total: 5.30 km^{2} (2.05 sq mi)
- Elevation: 651 m (2,136 ft)

Population (2026-01-01)
  - Total: 343
  - Density: 64.7/km^{2} (168/sq mi)
- Time zone: UTC+1 (CET)
  - Summer (DST): UTC+2 (CEST)
- Postal code: 383 01
- Website: www.obeczernovice.cz

Žernovice is a municipality and village in Prachatice District in the South Bohemian Region of the Czech Republic. It has about 300 inhabitants.

Žernovice lies approximately 4 kilometres (2 mi) east of Prachatice, 32 km (20 mi) west of České Budějovice, and 122 km (76 mi) south of Prague.

== Administrative division ==
Žernovice consists of two municipal parts (in brackets population according to the 2021 census):

- Žernovice (259)
- Dubovice (36)

== Demographics ==
Historical population
Year	Pop.	±%
1869	455	—
1880	412	−9.5%
1890	435	+5.6%
1900	488	+12.2%
1910	457	−6.4%
1921	429	−6.1%
1930	418	−2.6%
1950	263	−37.1%
1961	277	+5.3%
1970	237	−14.4%
1980	181	−23.6%
1991	141	−22.1%
2001	204	+44.7%
2011	256	+25.5%
2021	295	+15.2%
Source: Censuses
