= Vrbice (Prachatice District) =

- Municipality
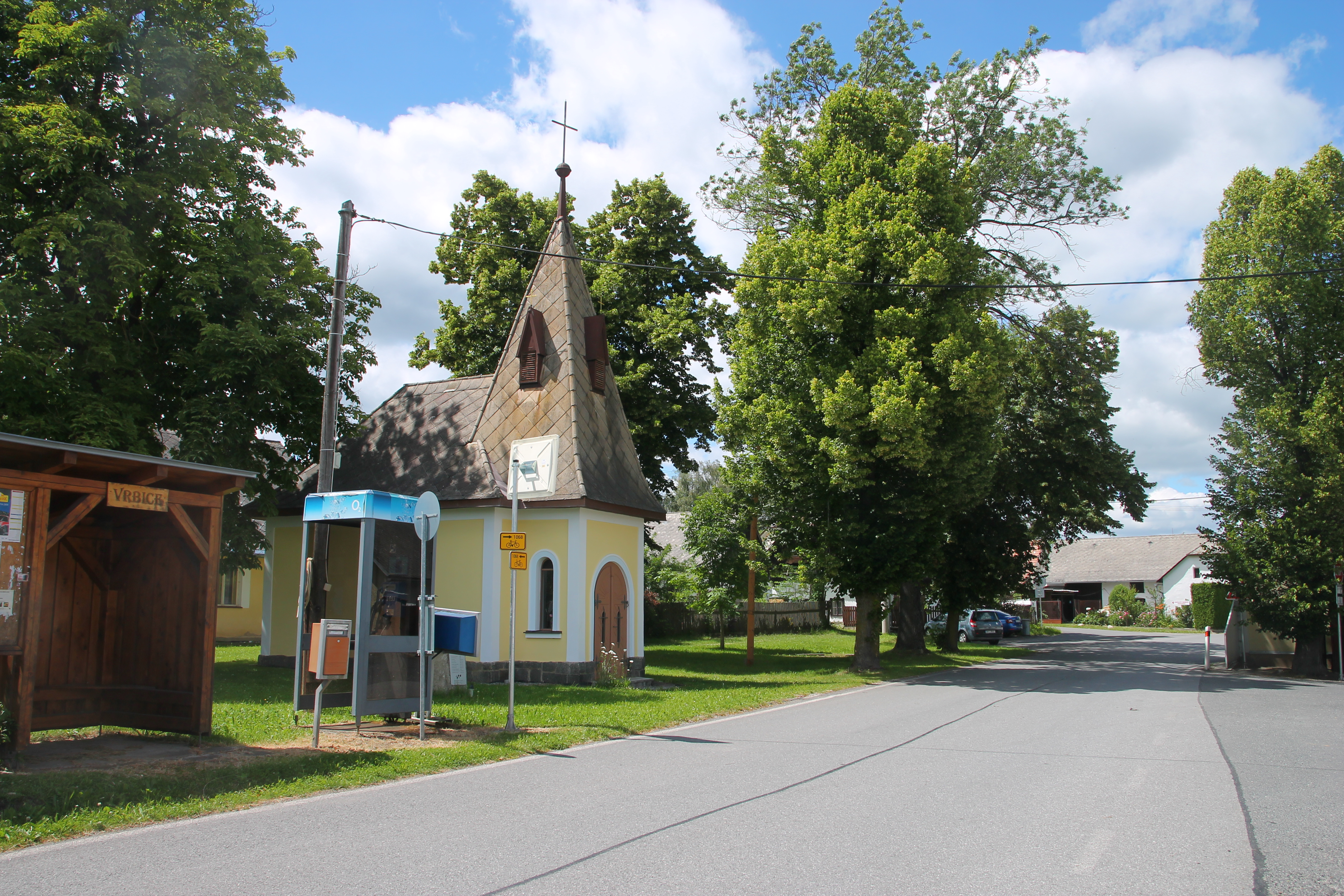
- Centre of Vrbice

- Location in the Czech Republic
- Coordinates: 49°8′29″N 13°42′57″E
- Country: Czech Republic
- Region: South Bohemian
- District: Prachatice
- First mentioned: 1382

Area
  - Total: 2.28 km^{2} (0.88 sq mi)
- Elevation: 747 m (2,451 ft)

Population (2026-01-01)
  - Total: 61
  - Density: 27/km^{2} (69/sq mi)
- Time zone: UTC+1 (CET)
  - Summer (DST): UTC+2 (CEST)
- Postal code: 384 73
- Website: vrbiceuvacova.cz

Vrbice is a municipality and village in Prachatice District in the South Bohemian Region of the Czech Republic. It has about 60 inhabitants.

Vrbice lies approximately 26 kilometres (16 mi) north-west of Prachatice, 60 km (37 mi) west of České Budějovice, and 117 km (73 mi) south-west of Prague.

== Demographics ==
Historical population
Year	Pop.	±%
1869	287	—
1880	313	+9.1%
1890	341	+8.9%
1900	385	+12.9%
1910	371	−3.6%
1921	329	−11.3%
1930	315	−4.3%
1950	212	−32.7%
1961	187	−11.8%
1970	119	−36.4%
1980	106	−10.9%
1991	73	−31.1%
2001	72	−1.4%
2011	69	−4.2%
2021	64	−7.2%
Source: Censuses
