= Kratušín =

- Municipality
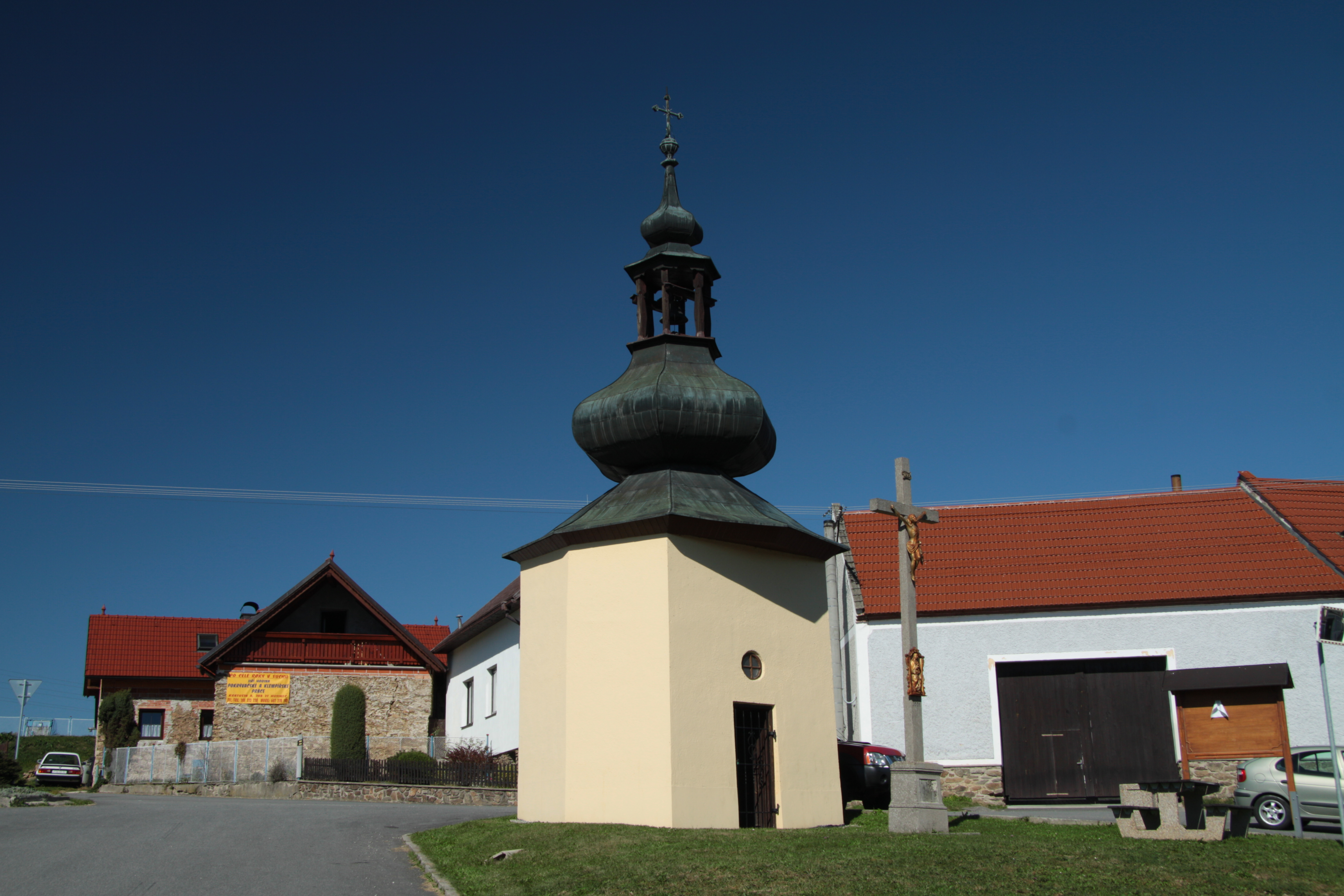
- Chapel of the Assumption of the Virgin Mary

- Location in the Czech Republic
- Coordinates: 49°1′13″N 13°55′43″E
- Country: Czech Republic
- Region: South Bohemian
- District: Prachatice
- First mentioned: 1389

Area
  - Total: 3.95 km^{2} (1.53 sq mi)
- Elevation: 613 m (2,011 ft)

Population (2026-01-01)
  - Total: 42
  - Density: 11/km^{2} (28/sq mi)
- Time zone: UTC+1 (CET)
  - Summer (DST): UTC+2 (CEST)
- Postal code: 384 21
- Website: www.kratusin.cz

Kratušín is a municipality and village in Prachatice District in the South Bohemian Region of the Czech Republic. It has about 40 inhabitants.

Kratušín lies approximately 6 kilometres (4 mi) west of Prachatice, 41 km (25 mi) west of České Budějovice, and 125 km (78 mi) south of Prague.

== Administrative division ==
Kratušín consists of two municipal parts (in brackets population according to the 2021 census):

- Kratušín (24)
- Chlístov (13)

== Demographics ==
Historical population
Year	Pop.	±%
1869	307	—
1880	305	−0.7%
1890	302	−1.0%
1900	284	−6.0%
1910	249	−12.3%
1921	258	+3.6%
1930	218	−15.5%
1950	148	−32.1%
1961	127	−14.2%
1970	121	−4.7%
1980	75	−38.0%
1991	62	−17.3%
2001	52	−16.1%
2011	51	−1.9%
2021	37	−27.5%
Source: Censuses
