= Buk (Prachatice District) =

- Municipality
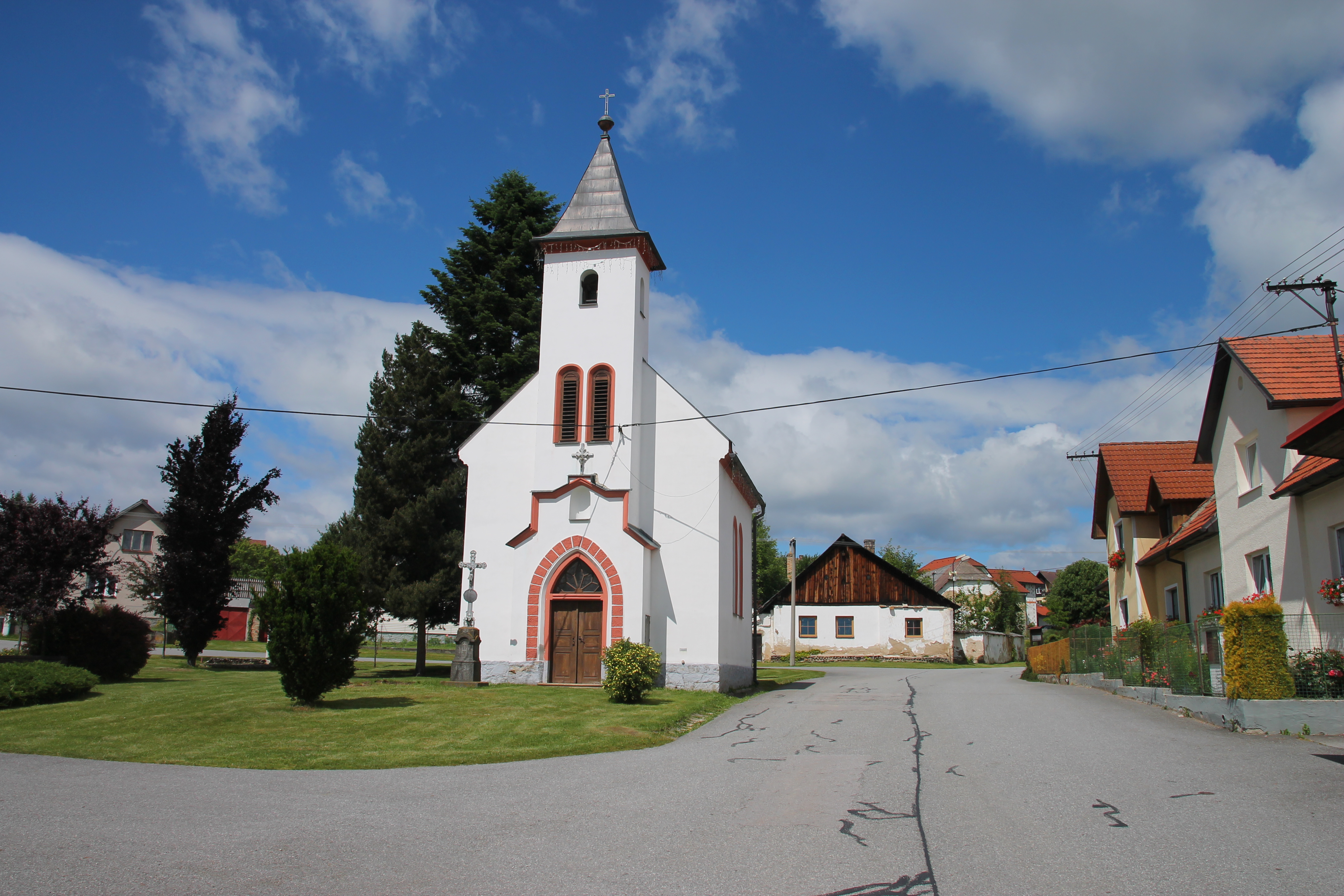
- Chapel of Our Lady of the Seven Sorrows

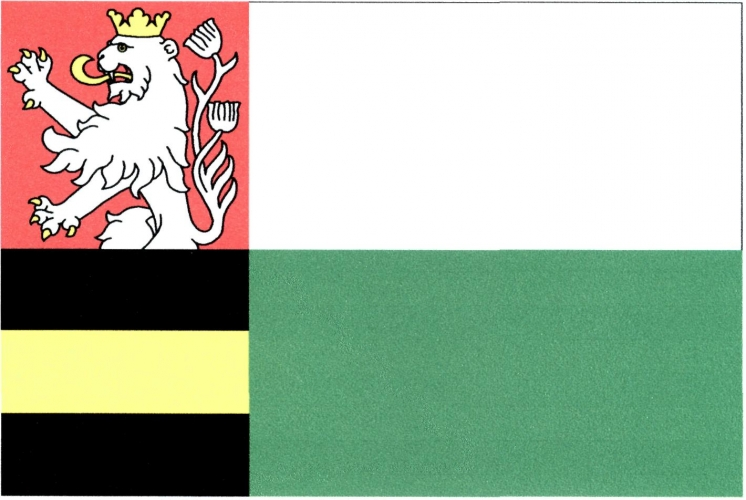
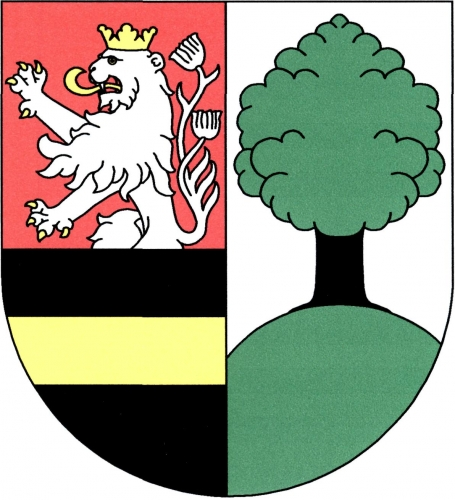
- Flag Coat of arms

- Location in the Czech Republic
- Coordinates: 49°2′17″N 13°50′43″E
- Country: Czech Republic
- Region: South Bohemian
- District: Prachatice
- First mentioned: 1299

Area
  - Total: 25.79 km^{2} (9.96 sq mi)
- Elevation: 826 m (2,710 ft)

Population (2026-01-01)
  - Total: 313
  - Density: 12.1/km^{2} (31.4/sq mi)
- Time zone: UTC+1 (CET)
  - Summer (DST): UTC+2 (CEST)
- Postal code: 383 01
- Website: www.obecbuk.cz

Buk is a municipality and village in Prachatice District in the South Bohemian Region of the Czech Republic. It has about 300 inhabitants.

Buk lies approximately 12 kilometres (7 mi) west of Prachatice, 47 km (29 mi) west of České Budějovice, and 124 km (77 mi) south of Prague.

== Administrative division ==
Buk consists of three municipal parts (in brackets population according to the 2021 census):

- Buk (231)
- Včelná pod Boubínem (42)
- Vyšovatka (23)

== Demographics ==
Historical population
Year	Pop.	±%
1869	677	—
1880	811	+19.8%
1890	787	−3.0%
1900	749	−4.8%
1910	733	−2.1%
1921	709	−3.3%
1930	679	−4.2%
1950	372	−45.2%
1961	378	+1.6%
1970	303	−19.8%
1980	263	−13.2%
1991	302	+14.8%
2001	284	−6.0%
2011	259	−8.8%
2021	296	+14.3%
Source: Censuses
