= Lipovice (Prachatice District) =

- Municipality
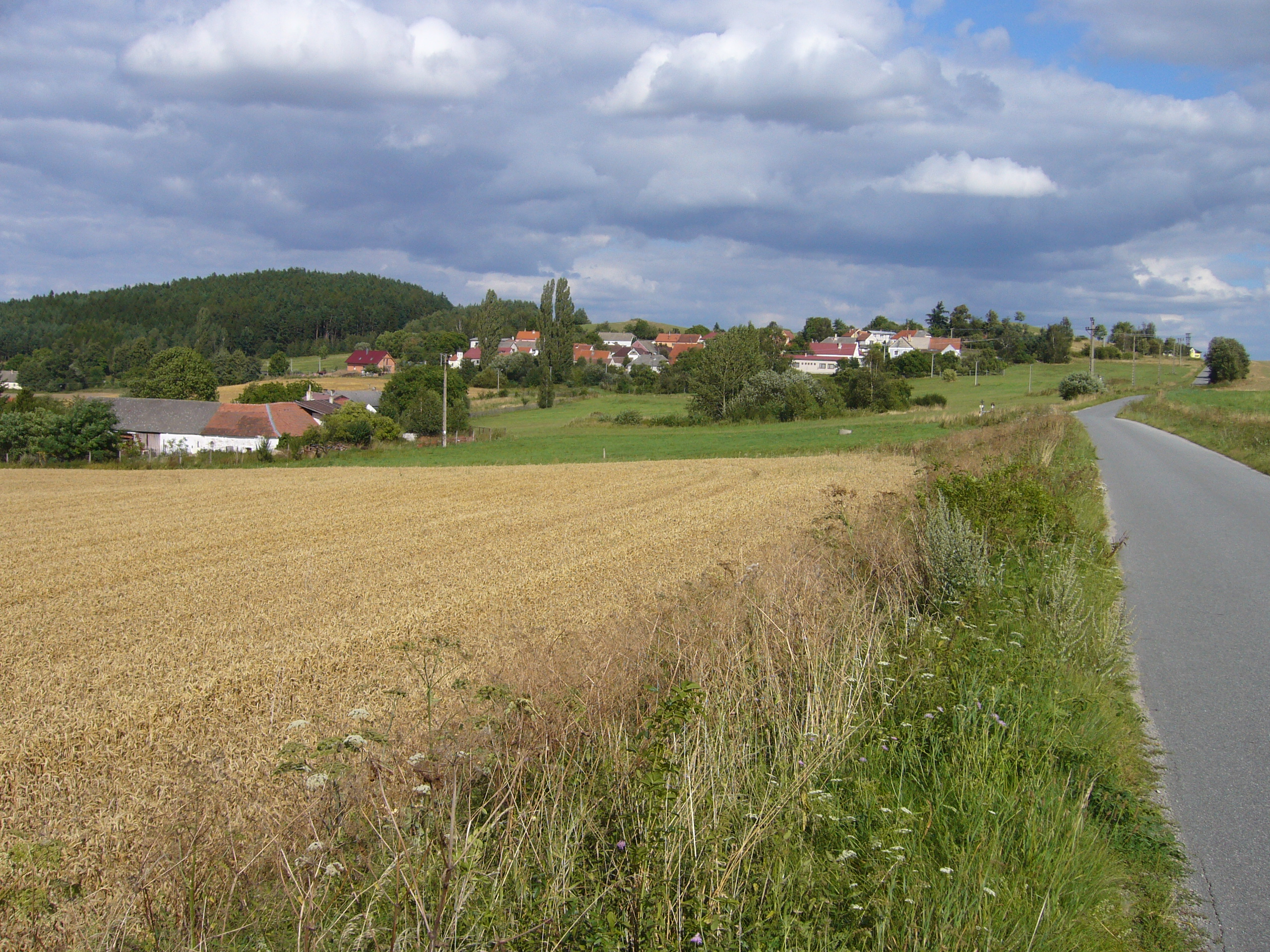
- General view

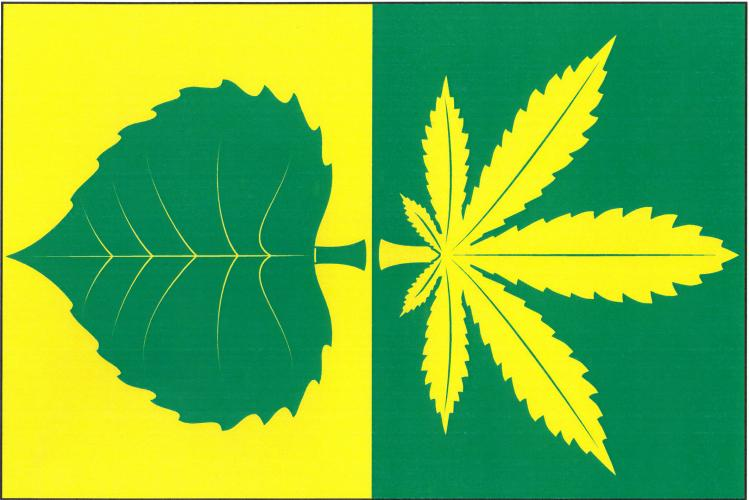
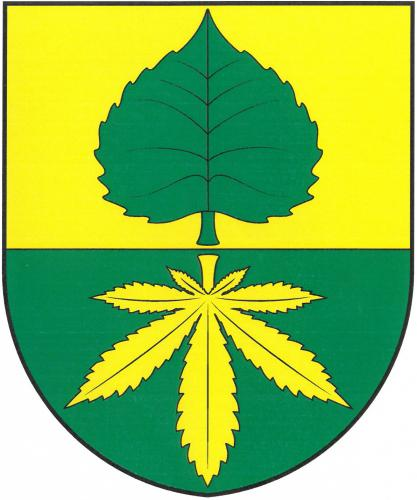
- Flag Coat of arms

- Location in the Czech Republic
- Coordinates: 49°6′2″N 13°59′38″E
- Country: Czech Republic
- Region: South Bohemian
- District: Prachatice
- First mentioned: 1386

Area
  - Total: 4.69 km^{2} (1.81 sq mi)
- Elevation: 568 m (1,864 ft)

Population (2026-01-01)
  - Total: 222
  - Density: 47.3/km^{2} (123/sq mi)
- Time zone: UTC+1 (CET)
  - Summer (DST): UTC+2 (CEST)
- Postal code: 384 22
- Website: www.obeclipovice.cz

Lipovice is a municipality and village in Prachatice District in the South Bohemian Region of the Czech Republic. It has about 200 inhabitants.

Lipovice lies approximately 10 kilometres (6 mi) north of Prachatice, 38 km (24 mi) west of České Budějovice, and 115 km (71 mi) south of Prague.

== Administrative division ==
Lipovice consists of two municipal parts (in brackets population according to the 2021 census):

- Lipovice (121)
- Konopiště (80)

== Demographics ==
Historical population
Year	Pop.	±%
1869	507	—
1880	488	−3.7%
1890	499	+2.3%
1900	510	+2.2%
1910	512	+0.4%
1921	501	−2.1%
1930	418	−16.6%
1950	328	−21.5%
1961	295	−10.1%
1970	235	−20.3%
1980	211	−10.2%
1991	215	+1.9%
2001	181	−15.8%
2011	188	+3.9%
2021	201	+6.9%
Source: Censuses
