= Olšovice =

- Municipality
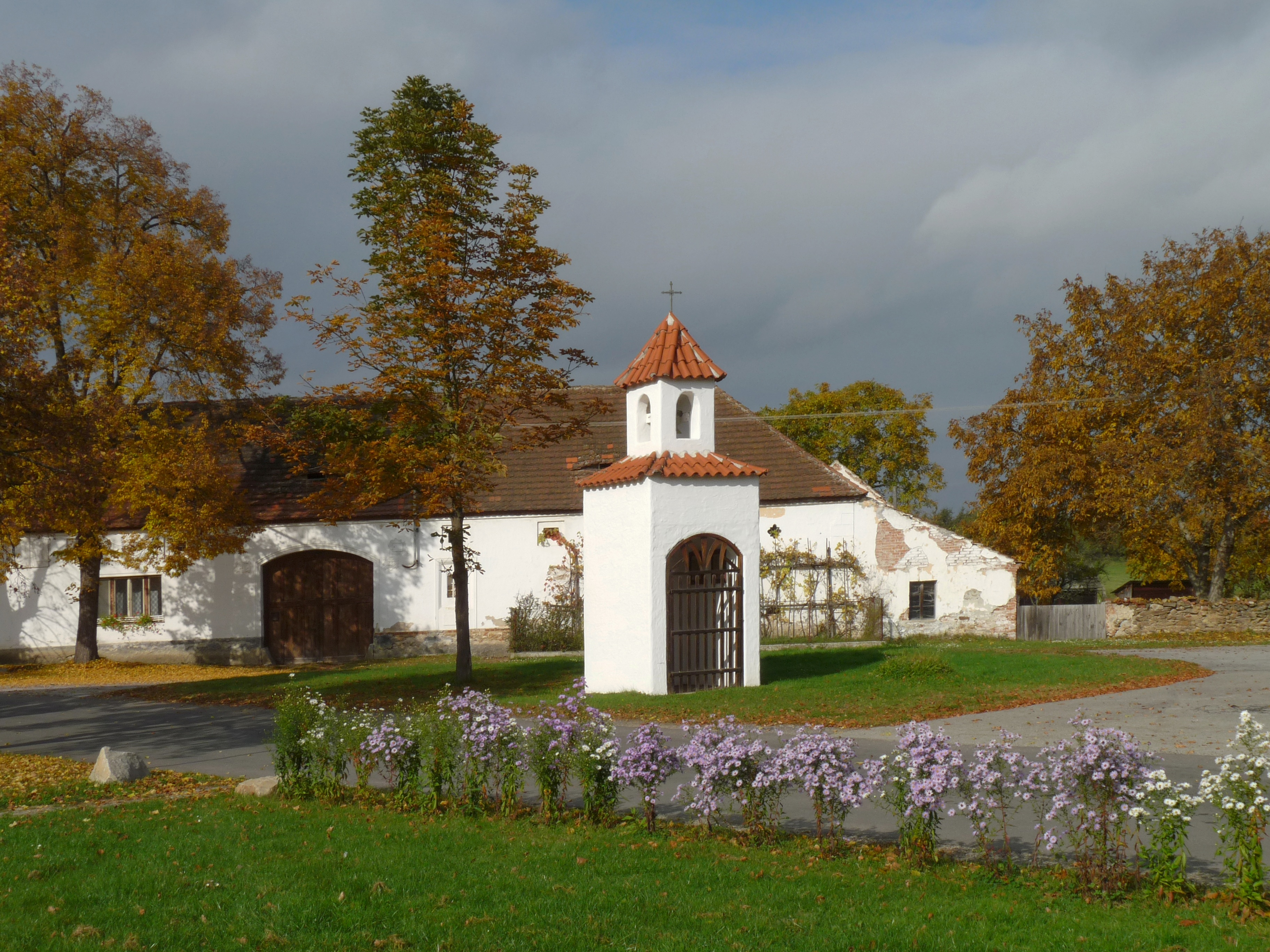
- Chapel in the centre of Olšovice

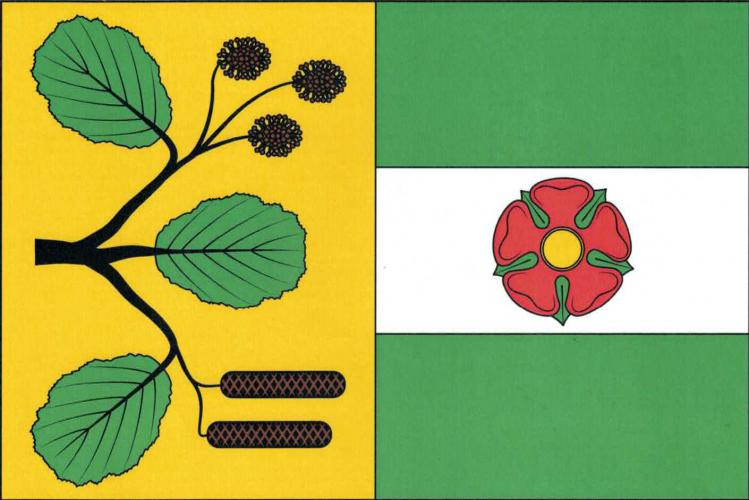
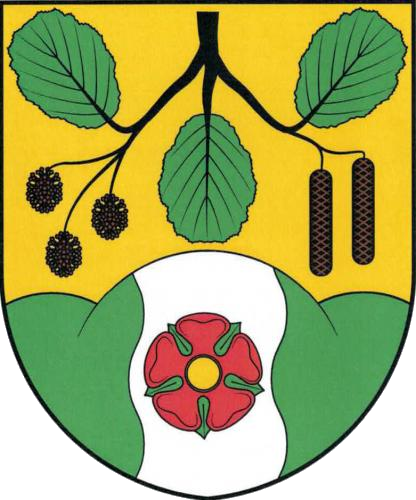
- Flag Coat of arms

- Location in the Czech Republic
- Coordinates: 49°3′25″N 14°14′9″E
- Country: Czech Republic
- Region: South Bohemian
- District: Prachatice
- First mentioned: 1248

Area
  - Total: 3.94 km^{2} (1.52 sq mi)
- Elevation: 438 m (1,437 ft)

Population (2026-01-01)
  - Total: 60
  - Density: 15/km^{2} (39/sq mi)
- Time zone: UTC+1 (CET)
  - Summer (DST): UTC+2 (CEST)
- Postal code: 384 11
- Website: www.olsovice.cz

Olšovice is a municipality and village in Prachatice District in the South Bohemian Region of the Czech Republic. It has about 60 inhabitants.

Olšovice lies approximately 19 kilometres (12 mi) east of Prachatice, 20 km (12 mi) north-west of České Budějovice, and 115 km (71 mi) south of Prague.

== Administrative division ==
Olšovice consists of two municipal parts (in brackets population according to the 2021 census):

- Olšovice (44)
- Hláska (11)

== Demographics ==
Historical population
Year	Pop.	±%
1869	187	—
1880	213	+13.9%
1890	181	−15.0%
1900	185	+2.2%
1910	191	+3.2%
1921	195	+2.1%
1930	186	−4.6%
1950	115	−38.2%
1961	105	−8.7%
1970	95	−9.5%
1980	87	−8.4%
1991	57	−34.5%
2001	39	−31.6%
2011	50	+28.2%
2021	55	+10.0%
Source: Censuses
