= Budkov (Prachatice District) =

- Municipality
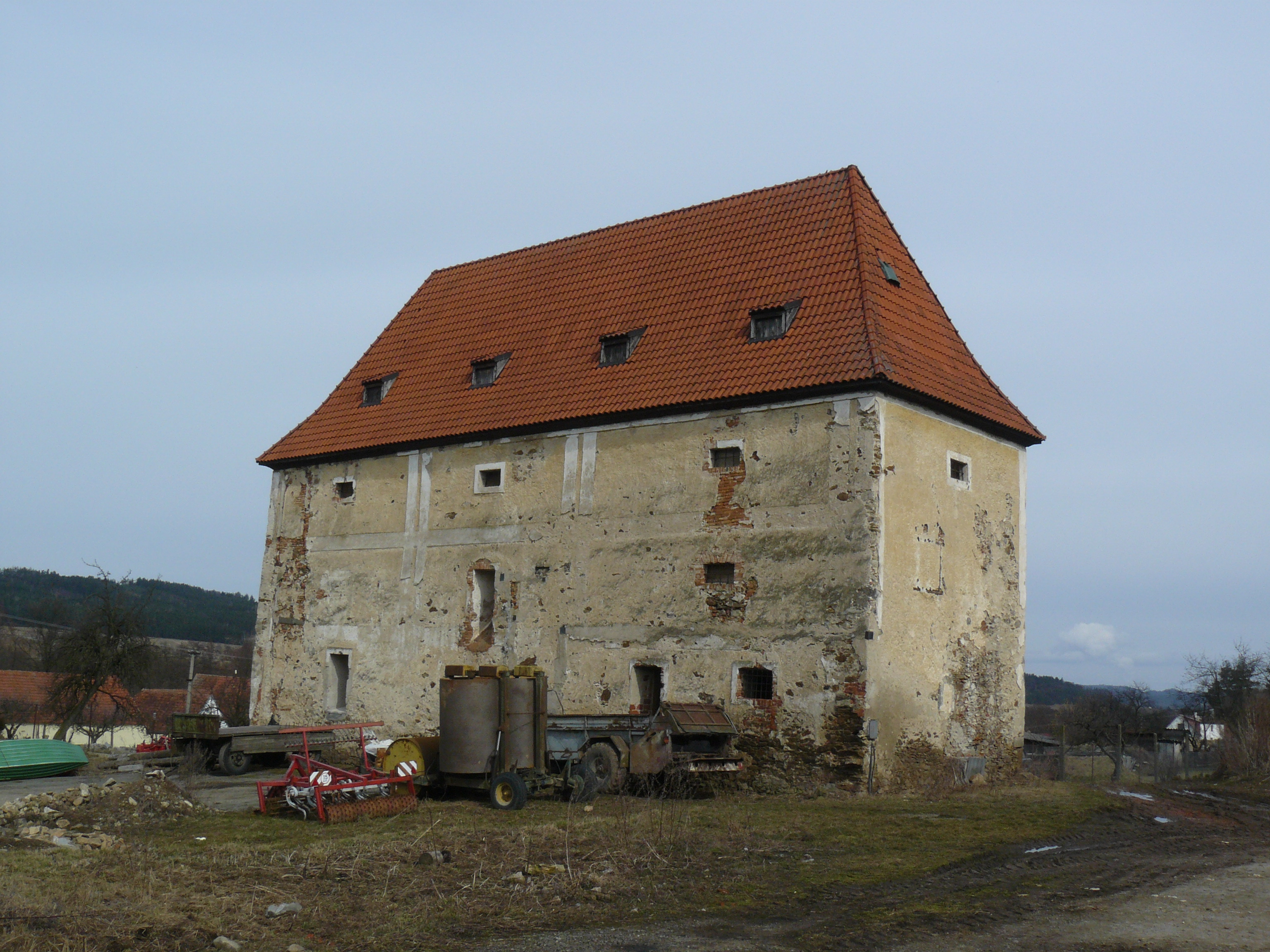
- Budkov Fortress

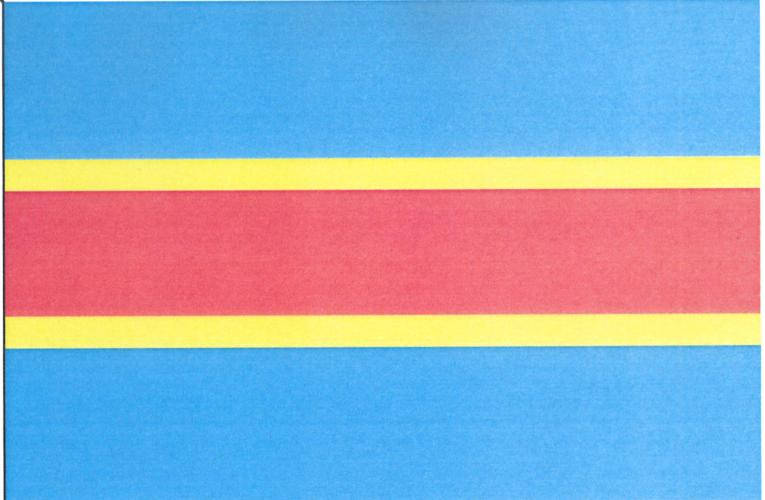
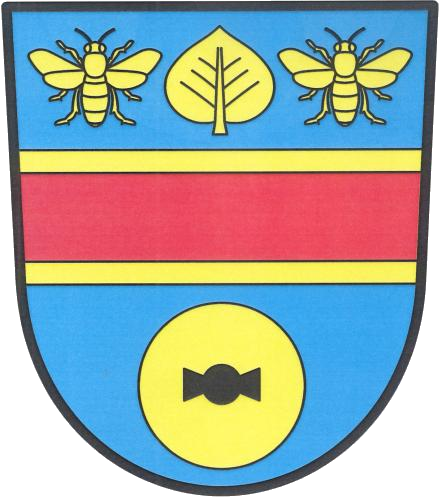
- Flag Coat of arms

- Location in the Czech Republic
- Coordinates: 49°4′13″N 14°0′25″E
- Country: Czech Republic
- Region: South Bohemian
- District: Prachatice
- First mentioned: 1354

Area
  - Total: 5.04 km^{2} (1.95 sq mi)
- Elevation: 490 m (1,610 ft)

Population (2026-01-01)
  - Total: 100
  - Density: 20/km^{2} (51/sq mi)
- Time zone: UTC+1 (CET)
  - Summer (DST): UTC+2 (CEST)
- Postal code: 384 22
- Website: www.budkov.net

Budkov is a municipality and village in Prachatice District in the South Bohemian Region of the Czech Republic. It has about 100 inhabitants.

Budkov lies approximately 7 kilometres (4 mi) north of Prachatice, 36 km (22 mi) west of České Budějovice, and 117 km (73 mi) south of Prague.

== Demographics ==
Historical population
Year	Pop.	±%
1869	314	—
1880	326	+3.8%
1890	315	−3.4%
1900	308	−2.2%
1910	299	−2.9%
1921	282	−5.7%
1930	237	−16.0%
1950	188	−20.7%
1961	130	−30.9%
1970	118	−9.2%
1980	115	−2.5%
1991	94	−18.3%
2001	81	−13.8%
2011	81	+0.0%
2021	93	+14.8%
Source: Censuses
