= Blanice (Otava) =

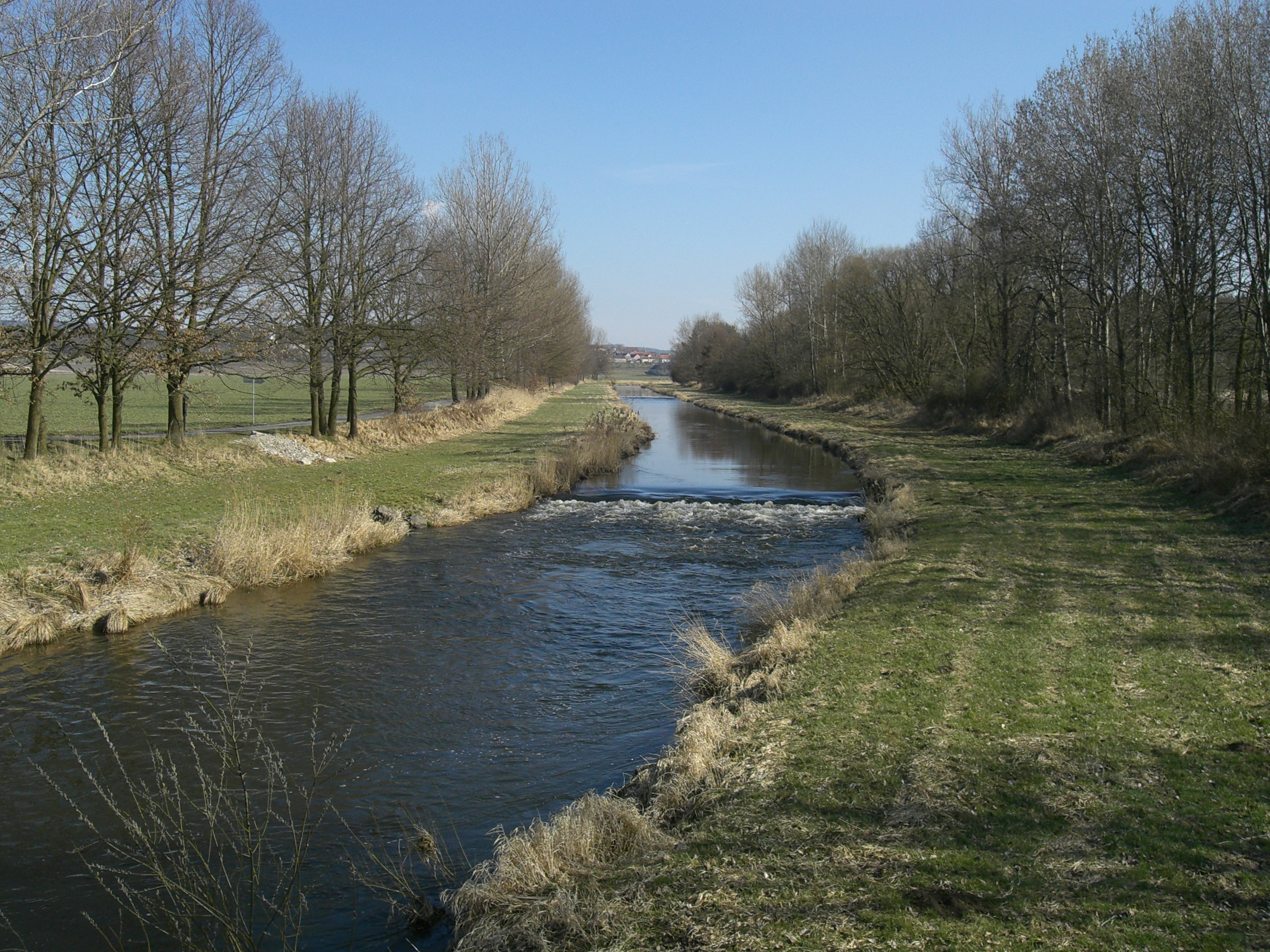
- The Blanice near Protivín-Maletice

Location
- Country: Czech Republic
- Region: South Bohemian

Physical characteristics
- Source
  - location: Boletice Military Training Area, Bohemian Forest
  - coordinates: 48°51′44″N 14°2′26″E
  - elevation: 970 m (3,180 ft)
- Mouth
  - location: Otava
  - coordinates: 49°16′37″N 14°7′0″E
  - elevation: 364 m (1,194 ft)
- Length: 94.7 km (58.8 mi)
- Basin size: 861.9 km^{2} (332.8 sq mi)
- Discharge
  - average: 4.65 m^{3}/s (164 cu ft/s) near estuary

Basin features
- Progression: Otava→ Vltava→ Elbe→ North Sea

The Blanice (Czech pronunciation: [ˈblaɲɪtsɛ]; German: Blanitz, Flanitz) is a river in the Czech Republic, a right tributary of the Otava River. It flows through the South Bohemian Region. It is 94.7 km (58.8 mi) long.

== Etymology ==
The name is derived from the old Czech word blan, which meant 'meadow'. The name referred to the character of the territory through which it flows. The river is sometimes called Vodňanská Blanice to distinguish it from the eponymous tributary of the Sázava.

== Characteristic ==
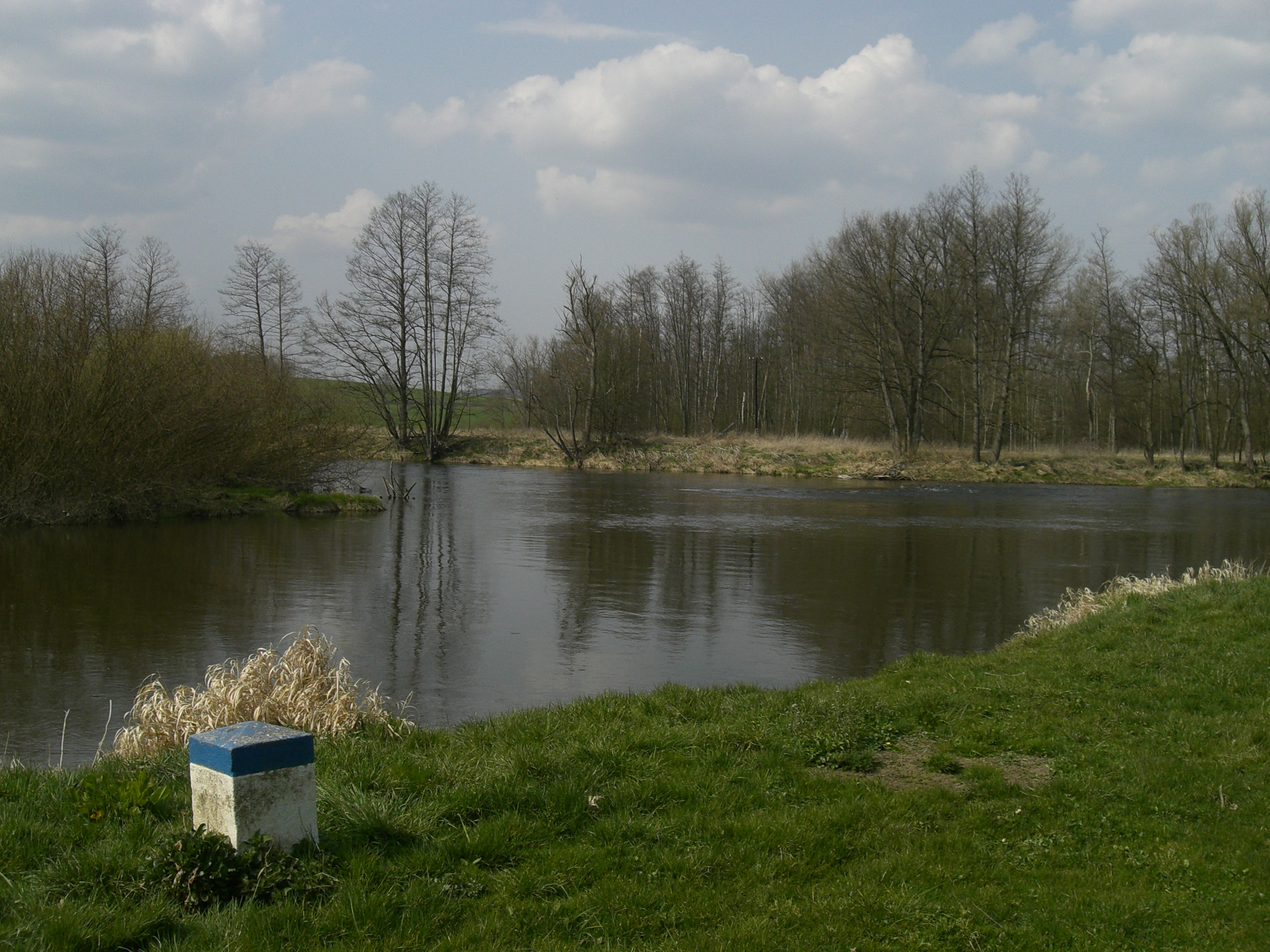
Confluence of the Blanice (front) and Otava

The Blanice originates in the territory of the Boletice Military Training Area in the Bohemian Forest at an elevation of 970 m (3,180 ft) and flows to Putim, where it enters the Otava River at an elevation of 364 m (1,194 ft). It is 94.7 km (58.8 mi) long. Its drainage basin has an area of 861.9 km^{2} (332.8 sq mi).

The longest tributaries of the Blanice are:

Tributary	Length (km)	River km	Side
Zlatý potok	36.7	41.0	right
Radomilický potok	21.3	19.4	right
Libotyňský potok	14.8	45.8	left
Dubský potok	13.7	45.1	left
Živný potok	13.6	52.2	right
Cikánský potok	13.3	65.8	left
Tálínský potok	9.4	11.6	right

== Course ==
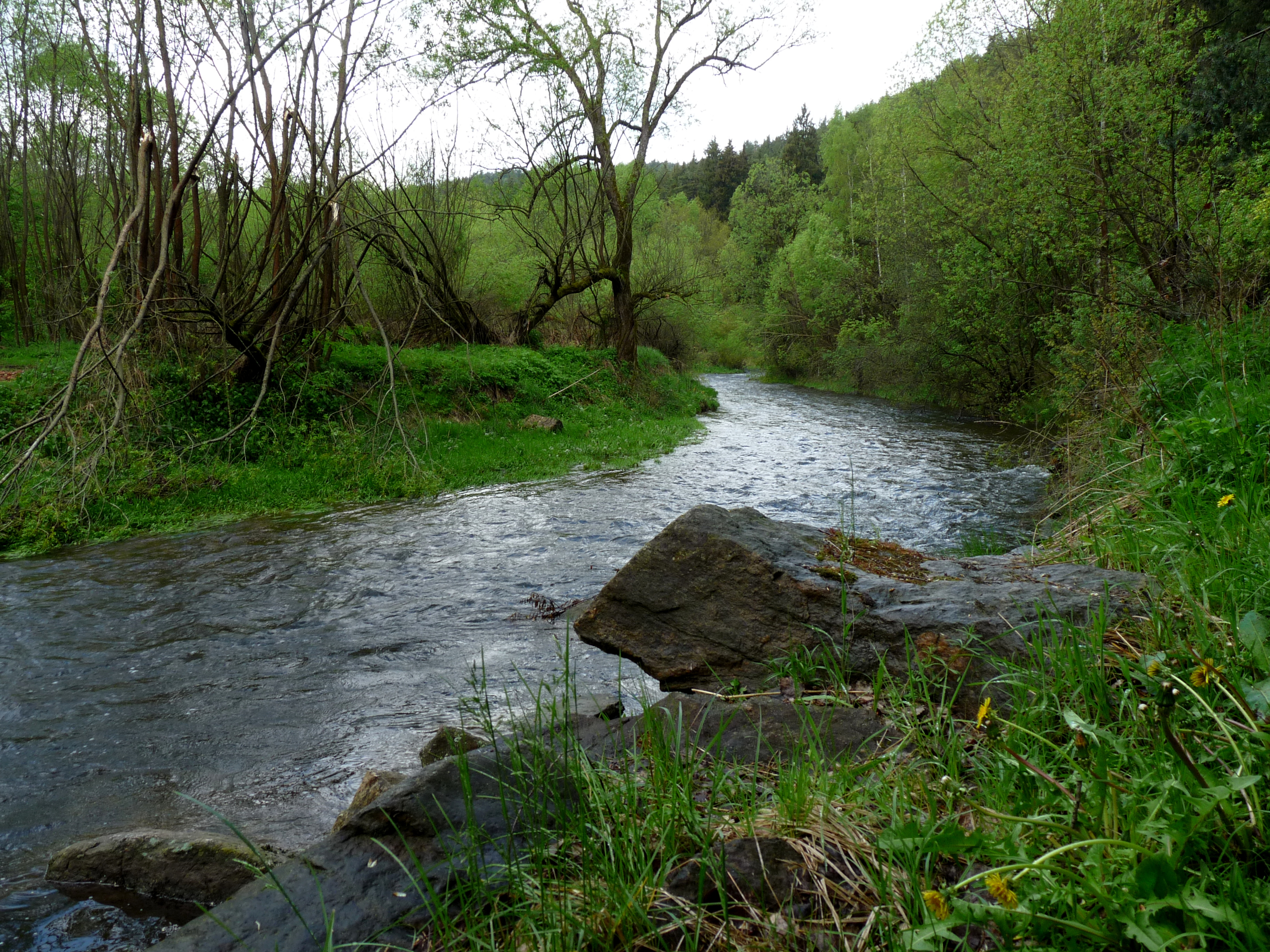
The Blanice near Dvory

The most notable settlement on the Blanice is the town of Vodňany. The river flows through the Boletice Military Training Area and through the municipal territories of Zbytiny, Volary, Záblatí, Kratušín, Zábrdí, Dvory, Prachatice, Husinec, Těšovice, Strunkovice nad Blanicí, Bavorov, Hájek, Vodňany, Protivín, Skály, Heřmaň and Putim.

== Bodies of water ==
There are 419 bodies of water larger than 1 ha in the basin area. The largest of them is the fishpond Dřemlínský with an area of 62 ha (150 acres). The only body of water built directly on the Blanice is the Husinec Reservoir. It was built in 1935–1939 for flood protection. It has an area of 61 ha.

== Nature ==
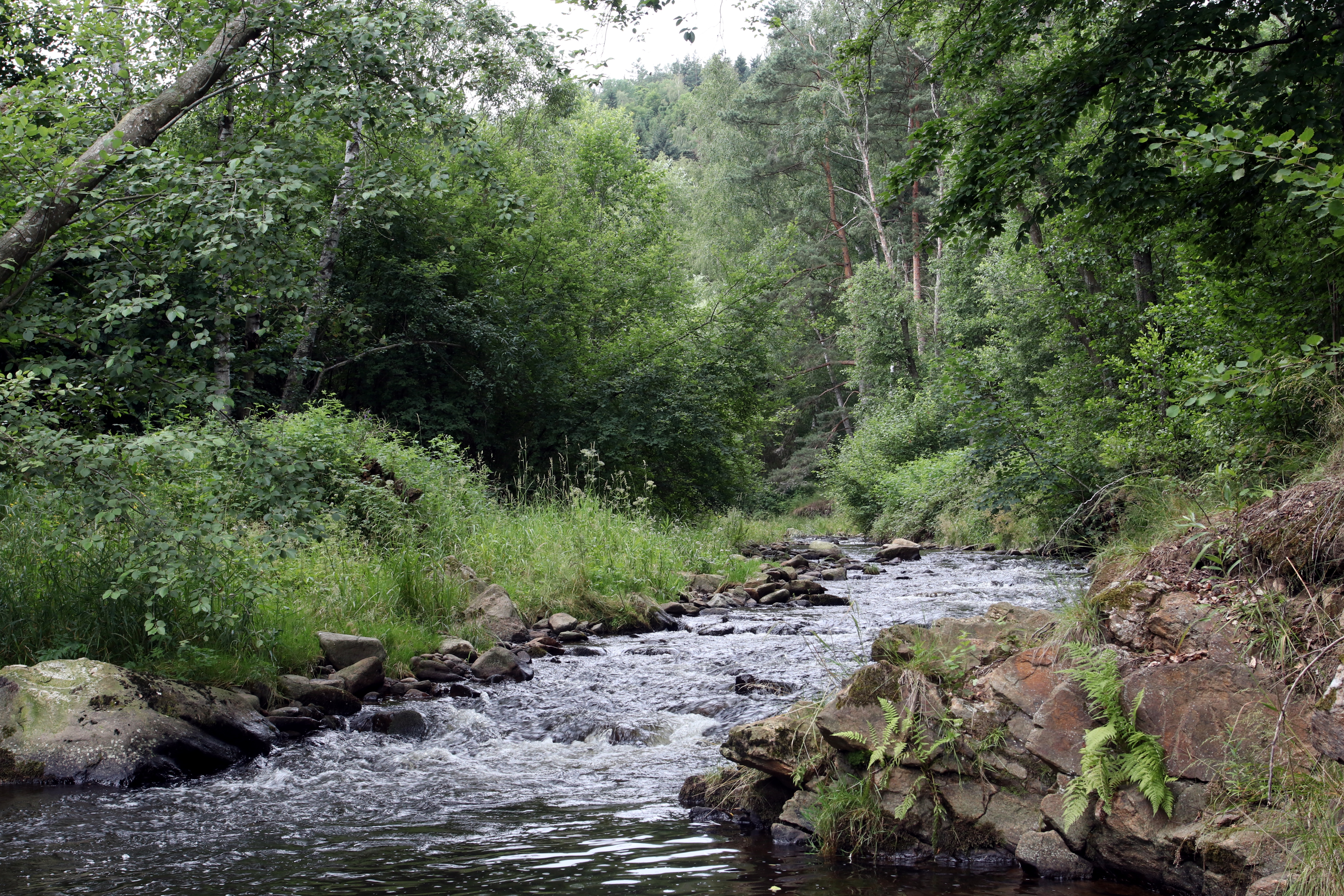
The Blanice flowing through Kaňon Blanice Nature Reserve

The Blanice is known for its abundance of the freshwater pearl mussel, which is critically endangered within the Czech Republic. Around 1990, the number of individuals in the river was estimated at 114 thousand. Due to a very severe winter in 1990, due to the pollution of the river in 1992 and due to the 2002 European floods, their number dropped to 7,500 in 2016. To increase the number of freshwater pearl mussel above 10,000, a project of experts is underway in the 2020s.

On the upper course of the river, there are two national nature monuments that protect the riverbed and its surroundings. Blanice National Nature Monument has an area of 292.2 ha (722 acres) and the adjoining Prameniště Blanice National Nature Monument has an area of 220.9 ha (546 acres). The subject of protection in these areas is primarily the biotope and the population of freshwater pearl mussels.

The valley of the river in the territory of Záblatí is protected as Kaňon Blanice Nature Reserve with an area of 131.0 ha (324 acres). The subject of protection is, among other things, the occurrence of freshwater pearl mussels, European bullheads and brook lampreys in the river.

The riverbed between Záblatí and Dvory is protected as Blanice Nature Monument with an area of 7.3 ha (18 acres). In addition to freshwater pearl mussels, the protected species European bullhead, brook lamprey, common minnow and Eurasian otter are found here.

== Tourism ==
The Blanice is suitable for river tourism. About 84 km (52 mi) of the river is navigable. The most popular is the section between Husinec and Strunkovice nad Blanicí, where rowing races and rafting are organized.

== See also ==
- List of rivers of the Czech Republic
