= Husinec (Prachatice District) =

- Town
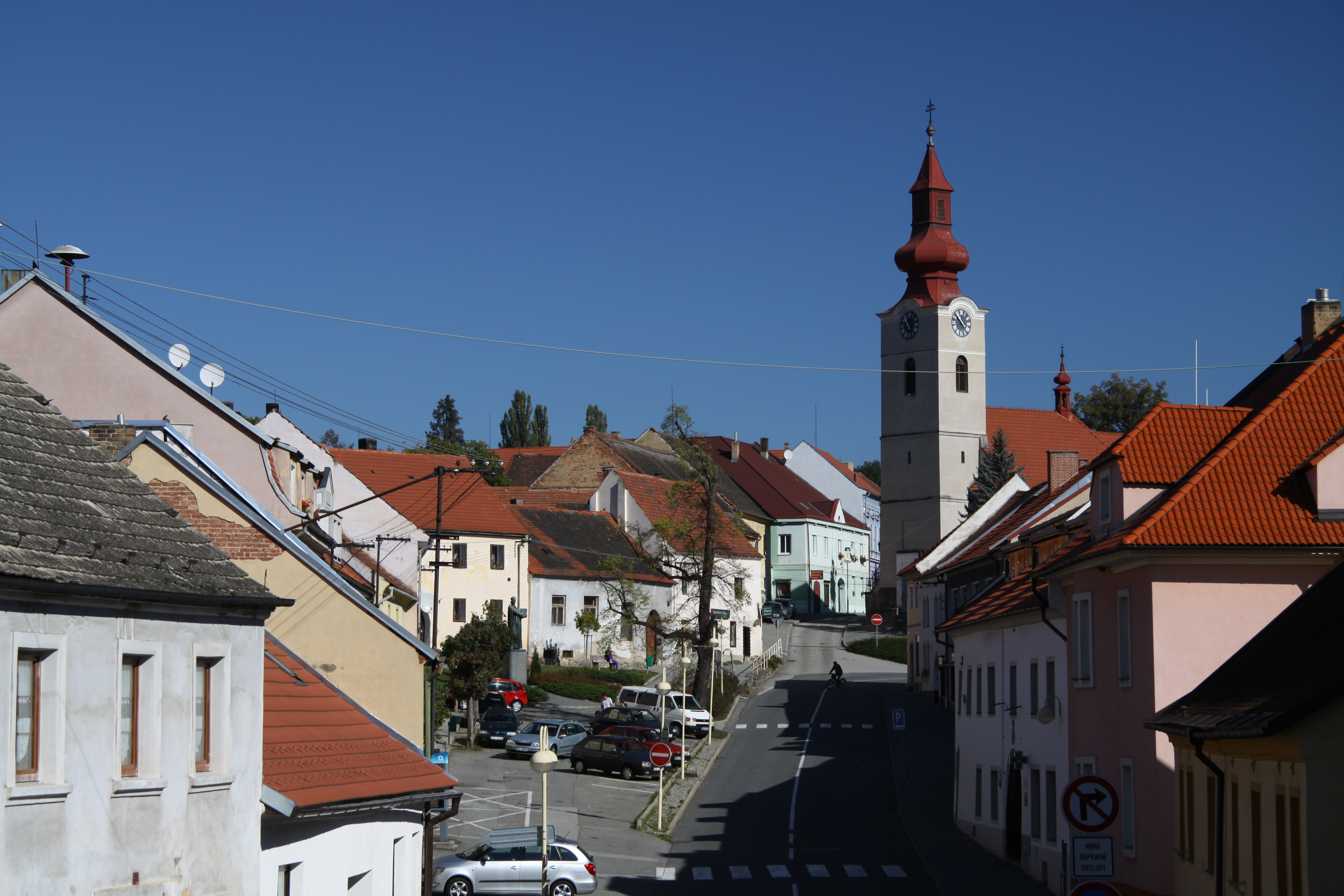
- Main road in Husinec

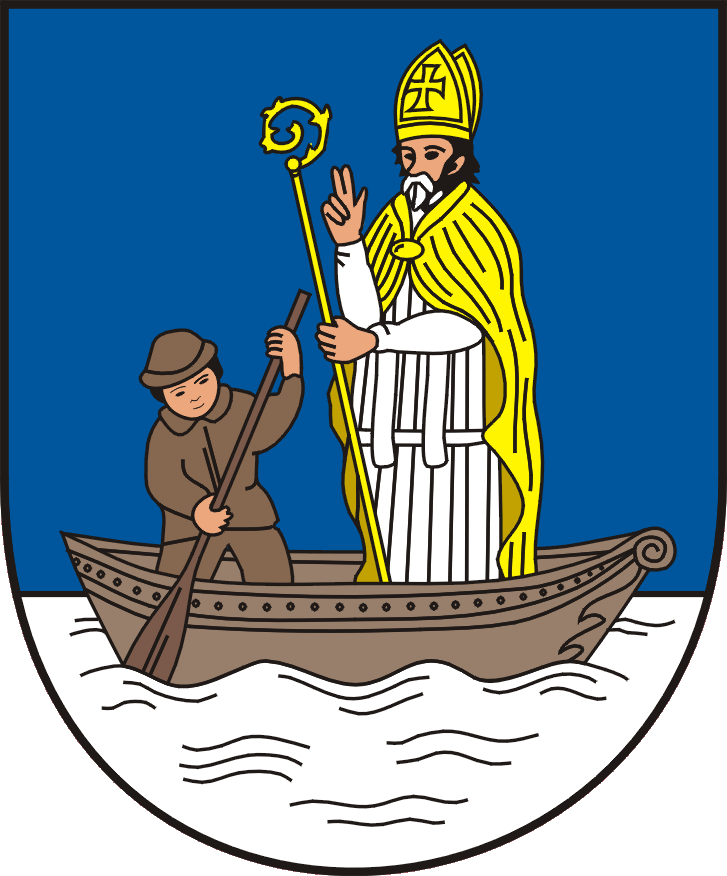
- Flag Coat of arms

- Location in the Czech Republic
- Coordinates: 49°3′18″N 13°59′13″E
- Country: Czech Republic
- Region: South Bohemian
- District: Prachatice
- First mentioned: 1291

Government
  - Mayor: Ludmila Pánková

Area
  - Total: 10.35 km^{2} (4.00 sq mi)
- Elevation: 504 m (1,654 ft)

Population (2026-01-01)
  - Total: 1,389
  - Density: 134.2/km^{2} (347.6/sq mi)
- Time zone: UTC+1 (CET)
  - Summer (DST): UTC+2 (CEST)
- Postal code: 384 21
- Website: www.husinec.cz

Husinec (Czech pronunciation: [ˈɦusɪnɛt͡s]; German: Hussinetz) is a town in Prachatice District in the South Bohemian Region of the Czech Republic. It has about 1,400 inhabitants. The town is located on the Blanice River in the Bohemian Forest Foothills.

Husinec became a town in 1359. It is known as the birthplace of one of the main figures in Czech history, Jan Hus, and his birth house is protected as a national cultural monument. The historic town centre is well preserved and is protected as an urban monument zone.

== Administrative division ==
Husinec consists of three municipal parts (in brackets population according to the 2021 census):

- Husinec (1,227)
- Horouty (13)
- Výrov (113)

== Etymology ==
The name is derived from the Czech word husa (i.e. 'goose'), meaning "the dwelling of the geese". The naming of the settlement was most likely figurative.

== Geography ==
Husinec is located about 4 kilometres (2 mi) north of Prachatice and 35 km (22 mi) west of České Budějovice. It lies in the Bohemian Forest Foothills. The highest point is a contour line below the top of the hill Výrovčice, at 706 m (2,316 ft) above sea level.

The Blanice River flows through the town. South of the town proper is the Husinec Reservoir, built on the Blanice. It was built in 1935–1939 for flood protection. It has an area of 61 ha (150 acres).

== History ==
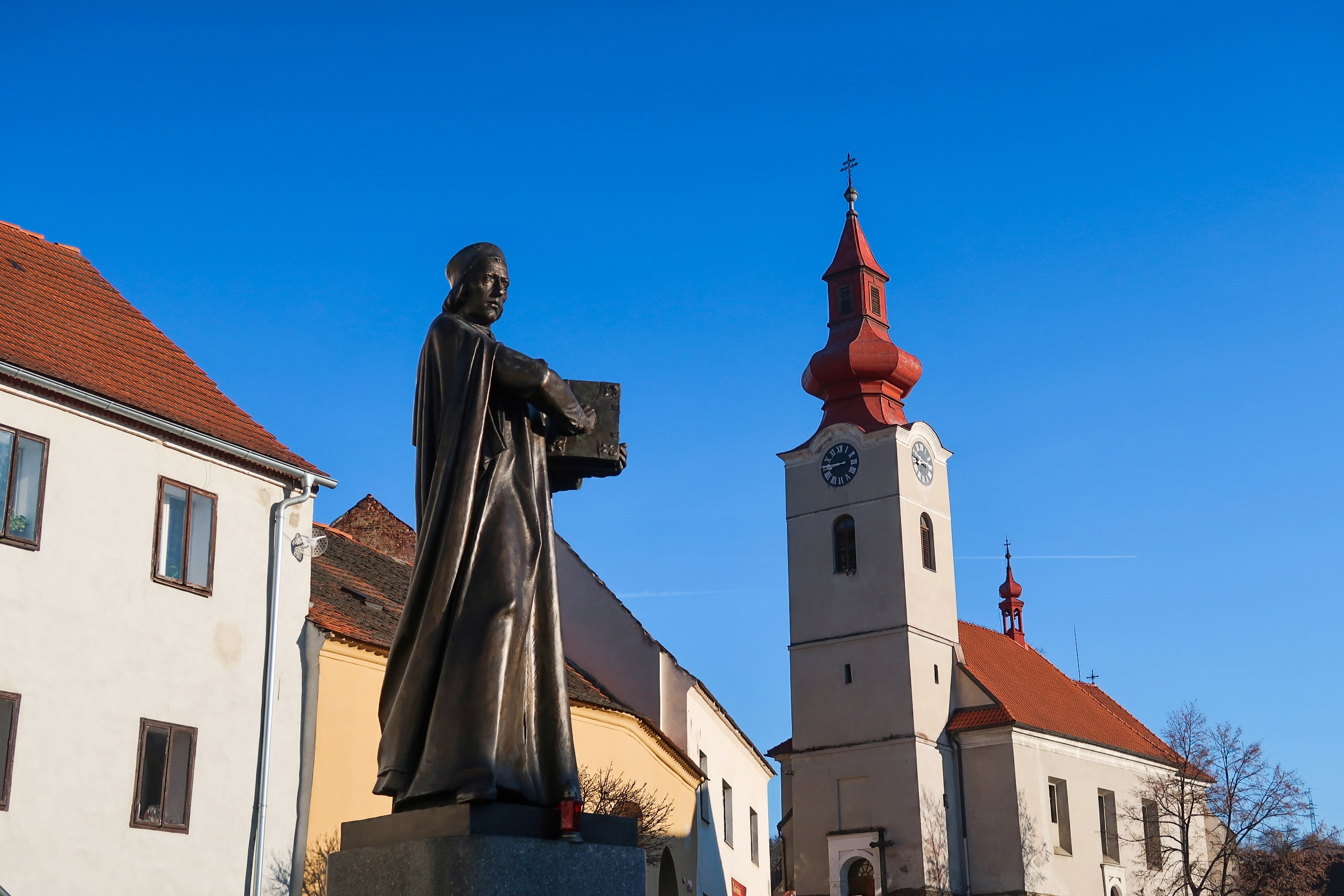
Statue of Jan Hus with the Church of the Exaltation of the Holy Cross

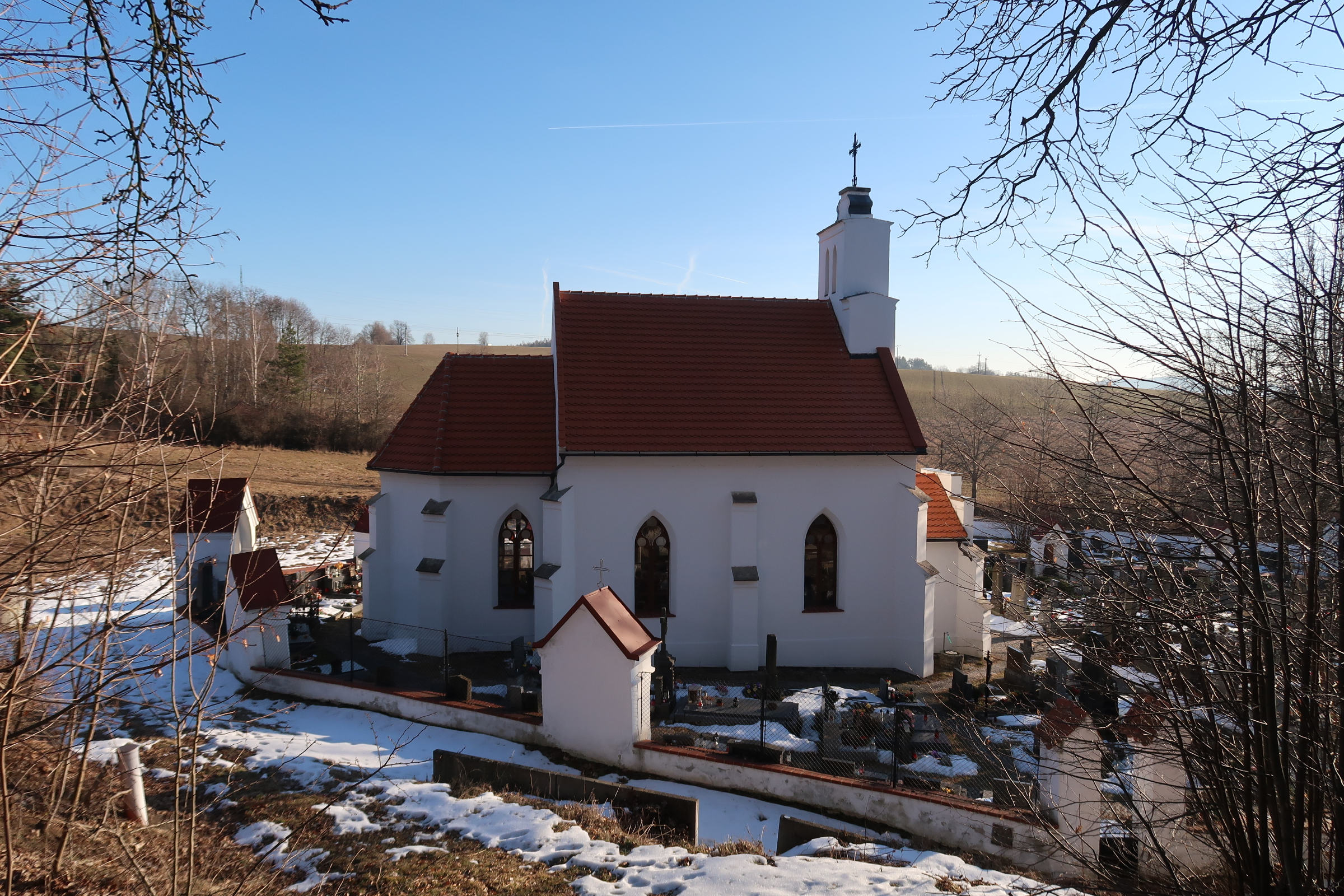
Church of Saints Cyril and Methodius

According to chroniclers, in 942, Duke Boleslaus I sent all the people to the local landscape who did not want to accept the Christian faith to pan for gold, from which the duke demanded tithe. The first written mention of Husinec is from 1291 when Heinrich Vok of Borek and Husinec declared his rights to the area at the District Court. In 1359, the village was promoted to a town.

In the 14th century, the Hus castle in the area of today's Záblatí was built and Husinec was attached to its newly established estate. In 1390, the Hus Castle and estate were taken by Sigismund of Huller and Orlík, a supporter of King Wenceslaus IV and eventually state treasurer and King's advisor. Caught falsifying documents, however, he was beheaded. The castle was left for his brother Andreas. A short time later he sold it to Knight Mikuláš of Hus, who died in 1420.

The abandoned castle was taken and plundered by the robber baron Habart from Hrádek, or Lopata from Budějovice, known as "the merchant of the Golden Trail". On 8 September 1441, landowners from surrounding towns joined together to attack and burn the castle. In 1455, Knight Smílek of Lnáře sold his allegiance to Ulrich II of Rosenberg, bringing Husinec under the rule of Vimperk.

The economy of Husinec was dependent upon the trade produced by the Golden Trail trade route. Goods transported on the route included, primarily, salt, expensive clothes, wine, seafood, tropical fruits, spices, iron, and weapons.

In 1601, Peter Vok of Rosenberg sold Husinec to the Kolowrat family. In 1630, the estate was acquired by Hans Ulrich von Eggenberg. After the Battle of White Mountain, many residents of Husinec who were followers of the reformer Jan Hus and his teachings emigrated abroad.

From 1655 to 1848, Husinec fell under the control of the House of Schwarzenberg. In 2007, Husinec was restored its status of a town.

== Demographics ==
Historical population

Year	Pop.	±%
1869	1,895	—
1880	2,073	+9.4%
1890	2,016	−2.7%
1900	1,856	−7.9%
1910	1,913	+3.1%

Year	Pop.	±%
1921	1,677	−12.3%
1930	1,420	−15.3%
1950	1,166	−17.9%
1961	1,242	+6.5%
1970	1,332	+7.2%

Year	Pop.	±%
1980	1,327	−0.4%
1991	1,253	−5.6%
2001	1,266	+1.0%
2011	1,382	+9.2%
2021	1,353	−2.1%

Source: Censuses

== Transport ==
There are no railways or major roads passing through the municipality.

== Sights ==
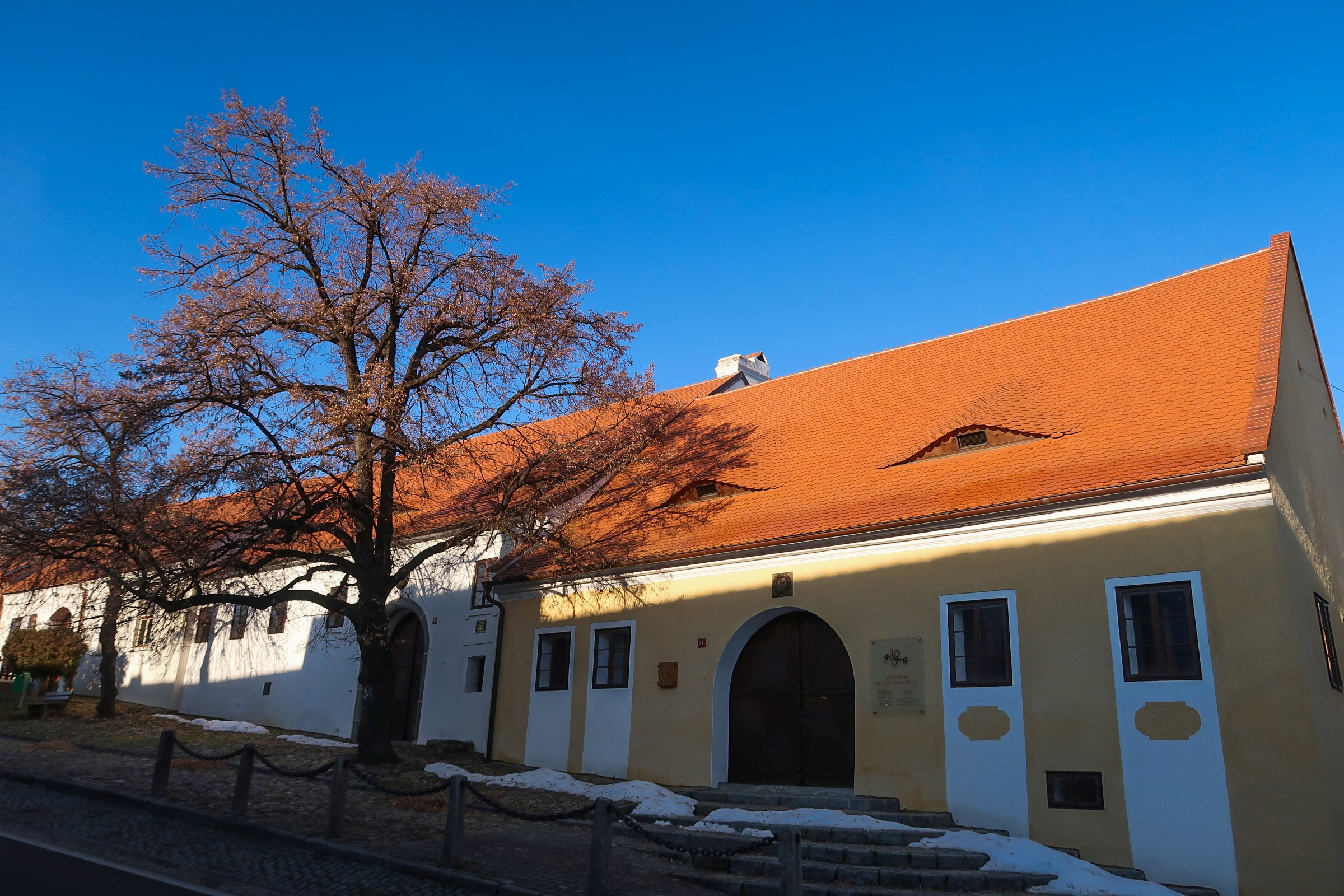
Birthplace of Jan Hus

The birthplace of Jan Hus is a national cultural monument. The originally Gothic house has been open to the public since 1873. There is also the statue of Jan Hus on the town square.

The Church of the Exaltation of the Holy Cross is a parish church from 1804. It was built after the original Gothic church was burned down in 1802.

The Church of Saints Cyril and Methodius is a neo-Romanesque cemetery church. It was built in 1870.

== Notable people ==
- Jan Hus (c. 1372 – 1415), theologian, philosopher and reformer
- Johann Pehel (1852–1926), composer
