= Strunkovice nad Blanicí =

- Market town
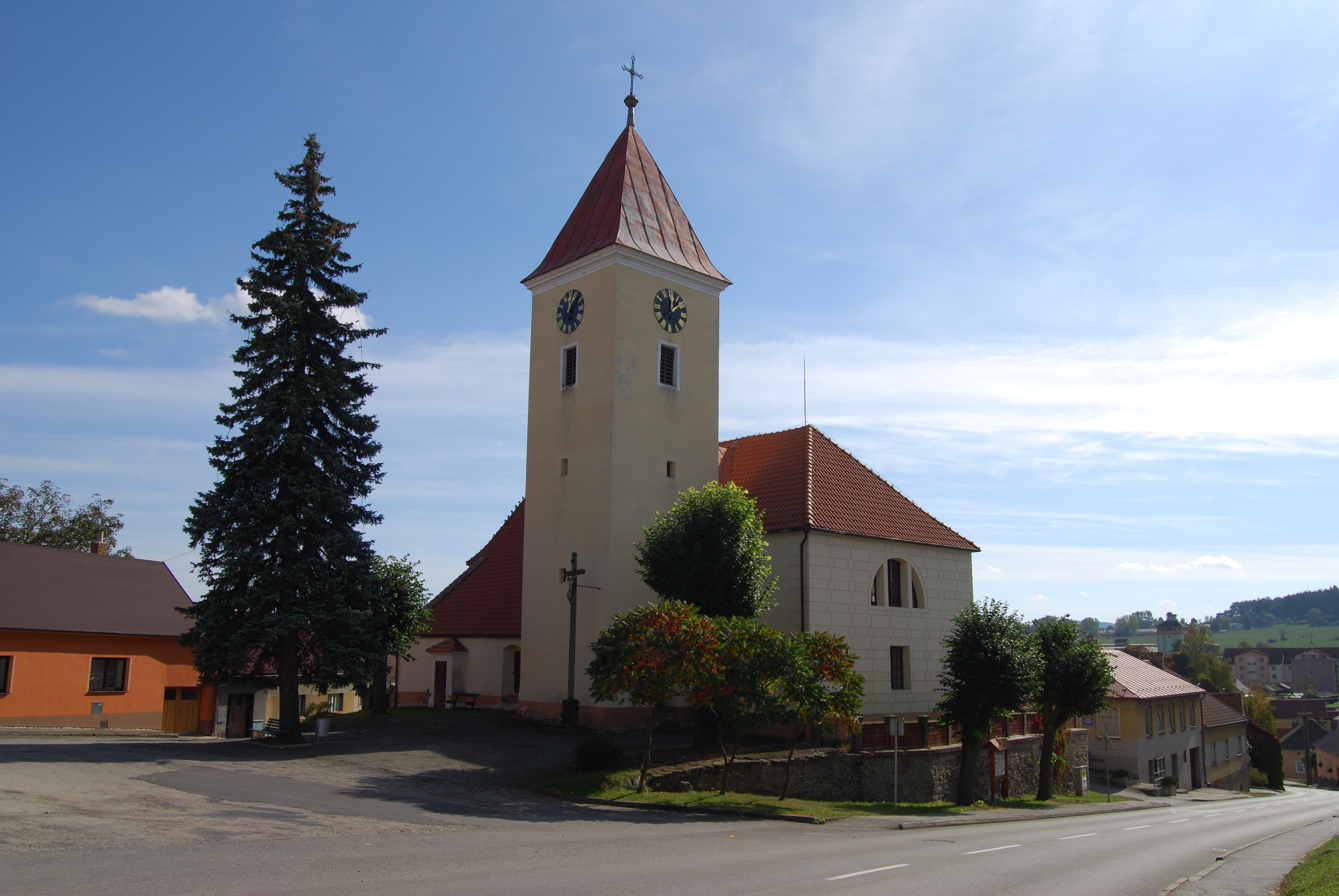
- Church of Saint Dominic and the main street

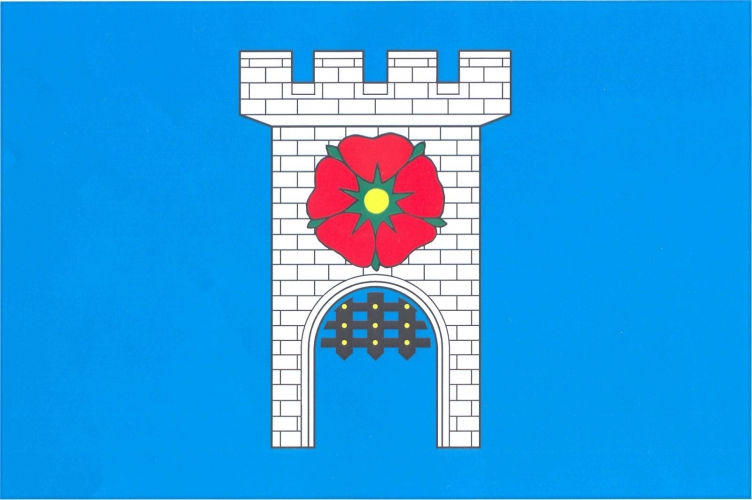
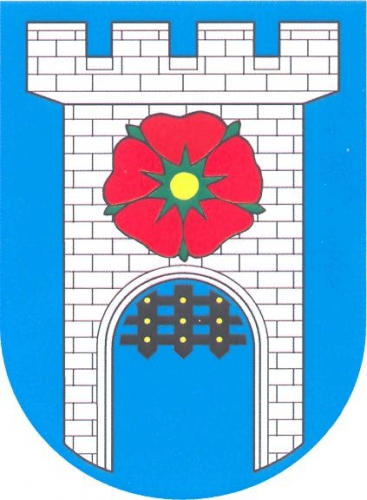
- Flag Coat of arms

- Location in the Czech Republic
- Coordinates: 49°5′3″N 14°3′19″E
- Country: Czech Republic
- Region: South Bohemian
- District: Prachatice
- First mentioned: 1227

Area
  - Total: 24.69 km^{2} (9.53 sq mi)
- Elevation: 458 m (1,503 ft)

Population (2026-01-01)
  - Total: 1,313
  - Density: 53.18/km^{2} (137.7/sq mi)
- Time zone: UTC+1 (CET)
  - Summer (DST): UTC+2 (CEST)
- Postal codes: 383 01, 384 11, 384 26
- Website: www.strunkovicenadblanici.cz

Strunkovice nad Blanicí (Czech pronunciation: [ˈstruŋkovɪtsɛ ˈnad blaɲɪtsiː]) is a market town in Prachatice District in the South Bohemian Region of the Czech Republic. It has about 1,300 inhabitants.

== Administrative division ==
Strunkovice nad Blanicí consists of eight municipal parts (in brackets population according to the 2021 census):

- Strunkovice nad Blanicí (872)
- Blanička (18)
- Malý Bor (24)
- Protivec (69)
- Šipoun (44)
- Svojnice (81)
- Velký Bor (95)
- Žíchovec (43)

== Etymology ==
The name Strunkovice is derived from the surname Strunka, meaning "the village of Strunka's people". The suffix nad Blanicí means 'upon the Blanice'.

== Geography ==
Strunkovice nad Blanicí is located about 8 kilometres (5 mi) northeast of Prachatice and 32 km (20 mi) west of České Budějovice. It lies in the Bohemian Forest Foothills. The highest point is the hill Zádušní les at 589 m (1,932 ft) above sea level. The Blanice River flows through the market town. The eastern part of the municipal territory is rich in small fishponds.

== History ==
The first written mention of Strunkovice nad Blanicí is from 1227.

== Demographics ==
Historical population

Year	Pop.	±%
1869	2,423	—
1880	2,417	−0.2%
1890	2,140	−11.5%
1900	2,007	−6.2%
1910	1,919	−4.4%

Year	Pop.	±%
1921	2,022	+5.4%
1930	1,953	−3.4%
1950	1,354	−30.7%
1961	1,459	+7.8%
1970	1,280	−12.3%

Year	Pop.	±%
1980	1,257	−1.8%
1991	1,180	−6.1%
2001	1,202	+1.9%
2011	1,231	+2.4%
2021	1,246	+1.2%

Source: Censuses

== Transport ==
Strunkovice nad Blanicí is located on the railway line Číčenice–Nové Údolí via Prachatice.

== Sights ==
The main landmark of Strunkovice nad Blanicí is the Church of Saint Dominic. It was built in the Gothic style in the second half of the 13th century. In the 18th century, it was modified to its current form.

== Twin towns – sister cities ==
Strunkovice nad Blanicí is twinned with:

- Stocken-Höfen, Switzerland
- Verkhnii Bystryi, Ukraine
