= Dvory (Prachatice District) =

- Municipality
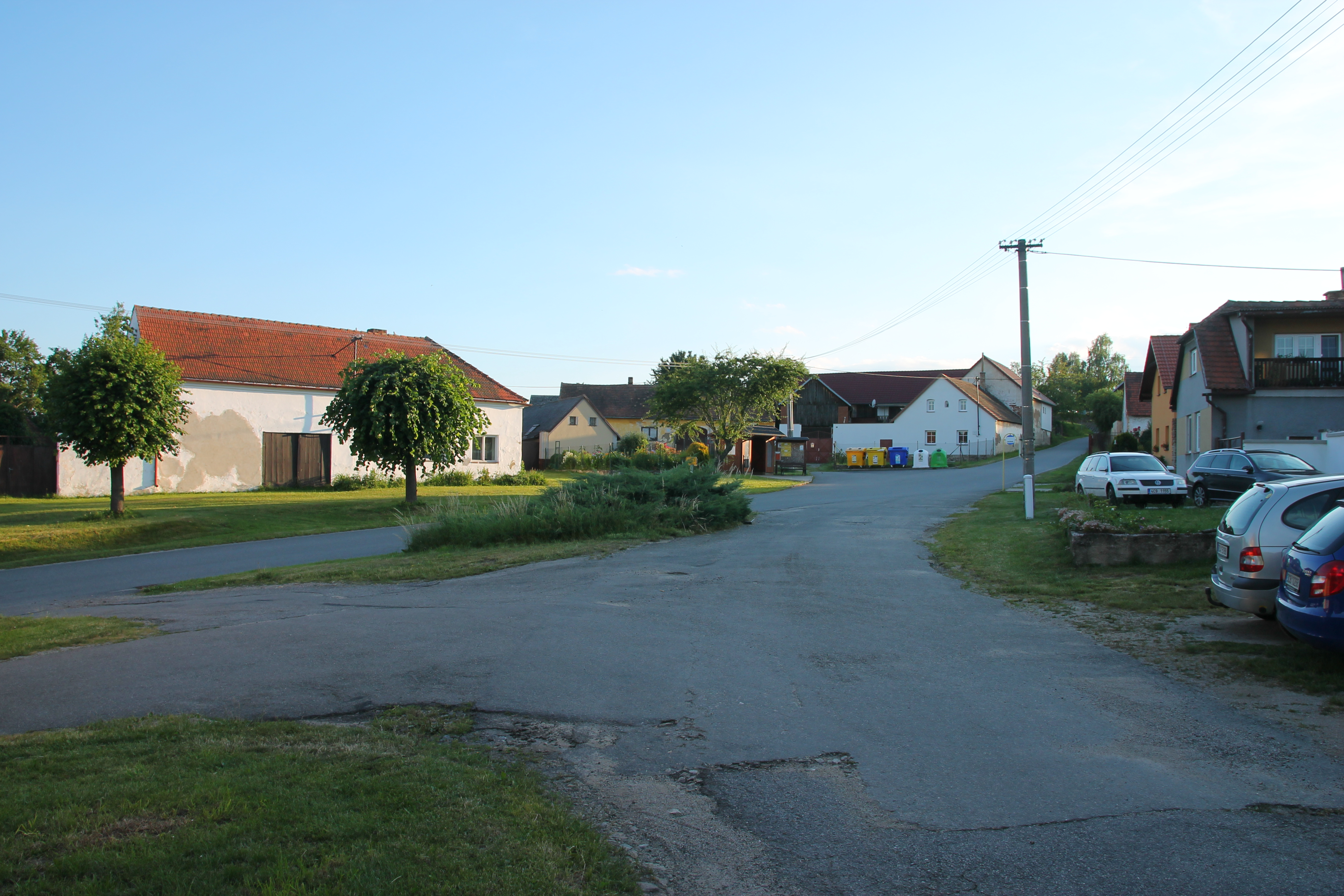
- Centre of Dvory

- Location in the Czech Republic
- Coordinates: 49°2′22″N 13°56′46″E
- Country: Czech Republic
- Region: South Bohemian
- District: Prachatice
- First mentioned: 1404

Area
  - Total: 3.34 km^{2} (1.29 sq mi)
- Elevation: 621 m (2,037 ft)

Population (2026-01-01)
  - Total: 99
  - Density: 30/km^{2} (77/sq mi)
- Time zone: UTC+1 (CET)
  - Summer (DST): UTC+2 (CEST)
- Postal code: 383 01
- Website: www.obec-dvory.cz

Dvory is a municipality and village in Prachatice District in the South Bohemian Region of the Czech Republic. It has about 100 inhabitants.

Dvory lies approximately 6 kilometres (4 mi) north-west of Prachatice, 40 km (25 mi) west of České Budějovice, and 121 km (75 mi) south of Prague.

== Demographics ==
Historical population
Year	Pop.	±%
1869	222	—
1880	204	−8.1%
1890	189	−7.4%
1900	191	+1.1%
1910	193	+1.0%
1921	214	+10.9%
1930	178	−16.8%
1950	144	−19.1%
1961	133	−7.6%
1970	116	−12.8%
1980	97	−16.4%
1991	81	−16.5%
2001	69	−14.8%
2011	73	+5.8%
2021	103	+41.1%
Source: Censuses
