= Protivín =

- Town
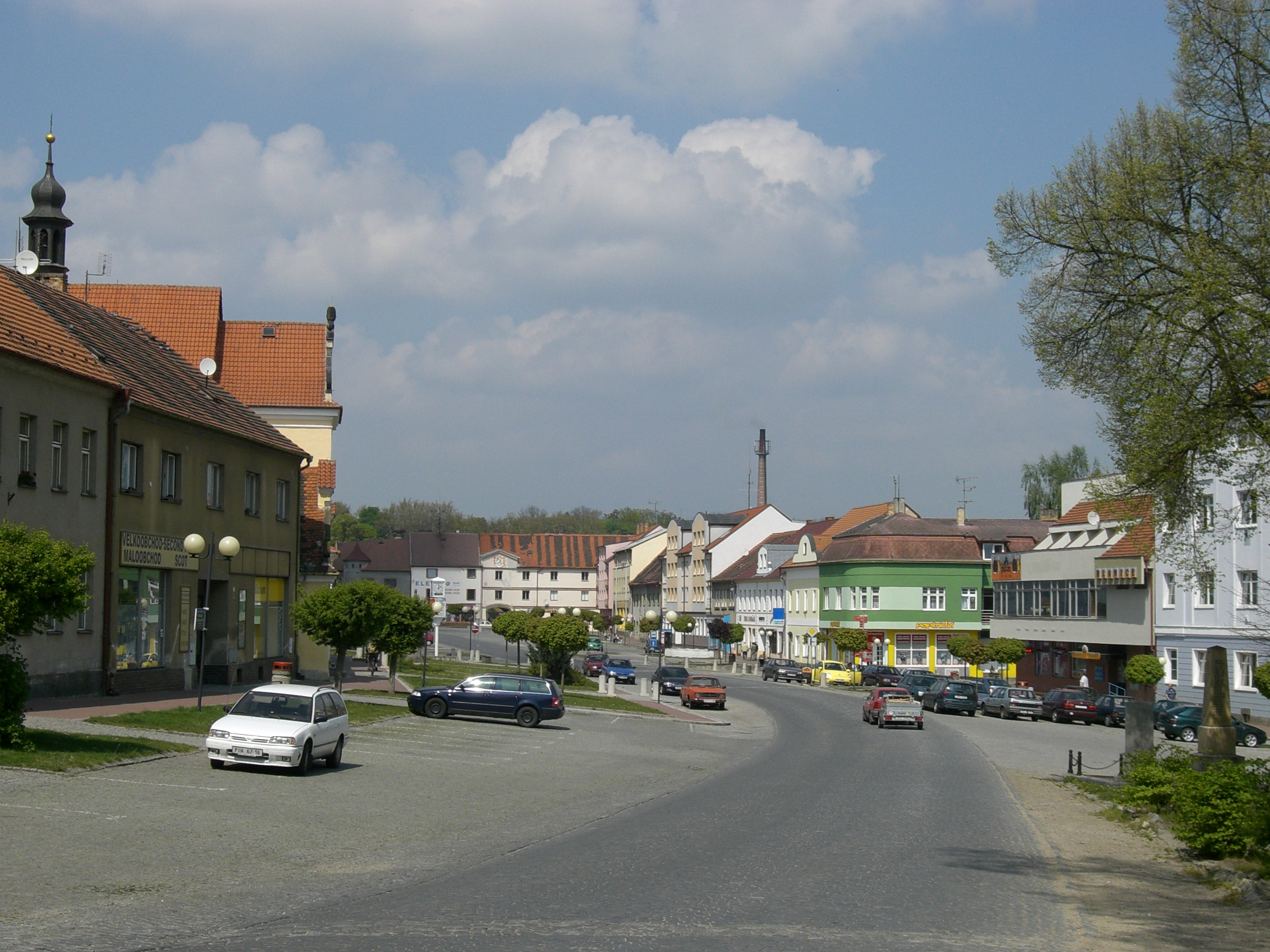
- The square Masarykovo náměstí

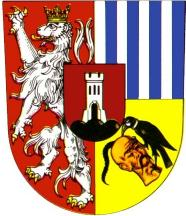
- Flag Coat of arms

- Location in the Czech Republic
- Coordinates: 49°11′58″N 14°13′2″E
- Country: Czech Republic
- Region: South Bohemian
- District: Písek
- First mentioned: 1282

Government
  - Mayor: Jaromír Hlaváč

Area
  - Total: 61.45 km^{2} (23.73 sq mi)
- Elevation: 383 m (1,257 ft)

Population (2026-01-01)
  - Total: 4,706
  - Density: 76.58/km^{2} (198.3/sq mi)
- Time zone: UTC+1 (CET)
  - Summer (DST): UTC+2 (CEST)
- Postal code: 398 11
- Website: www.muprotivin.cz

Protivín (Czech pronunciation: [ˈprocɪviːn]) is a town in Písek District in the South Bohemian Region of the Czech Republic. It has about 4,700 inhabitants.

== Administrative division ==
Protivín consists of nine municipal parts (in brackets population according to the 2021 census):

- Protivín (3,591)
- Chvaletice (93)
- Krč (195)
- Maletice (50)
- Milenovice (169)
- Myšenec (250)
- Selibov (87)
- Těšínov (93)
- Záboří (135)

== Etymology ==
The name is derived from the personal name Protiva, meaning "Protiva's (court, castle)".

== Geography ==
Protivín is located about 12 kilometres (7 mi) south of Písek and 30 km (19 mi) northwest of České Budějovice. Most of the municipal territory lies in the České Budějovice Basin, but the eastern part extends into the Tábor Uplands and includes the highest point of Protivín, a nameless hill at 555 m (1,821 ft) above sea level. The Blanice River flows through the town. There are several fishponds in the municipal territory.

== History ==
The first written mention of Protivín is from 1282. It was founded around 1260 as a village and fortress by a ford across the river Blanice.

In the late 19th century, Protivín developed. However, the prosperity ended with the closure of the sugar factory and a wave of emigration, especially to Iowa in the United States, where the settlement named Protivin was founded by immigrants in 1872. However, the population continued to grow, and in 1899, Protivín was promoted to a town.

== Demographics ==
Historical population

Year	Pop.	±%
1869	4,362	—
1880	5,384	+23.4%
1890	5,135	−4.6%
1900	5,940	+15.7%
1910	6,273	+5.6%

Year	Pop.	±%
1921	6,058	−3.4%
1930	5,781	−4.6%
1950	4,850	−16.1%
1961	5,202	+7.3%
1970	4,868	−6.4%

Year	Pop.	±%
1980	5,248	+7.8%
1991	4,859	−7.4%
2001	4,952	+1.9%
2011	4,811	−2.8%
2021	4,663	−3.1%

Source: Censuses

== Economy ==
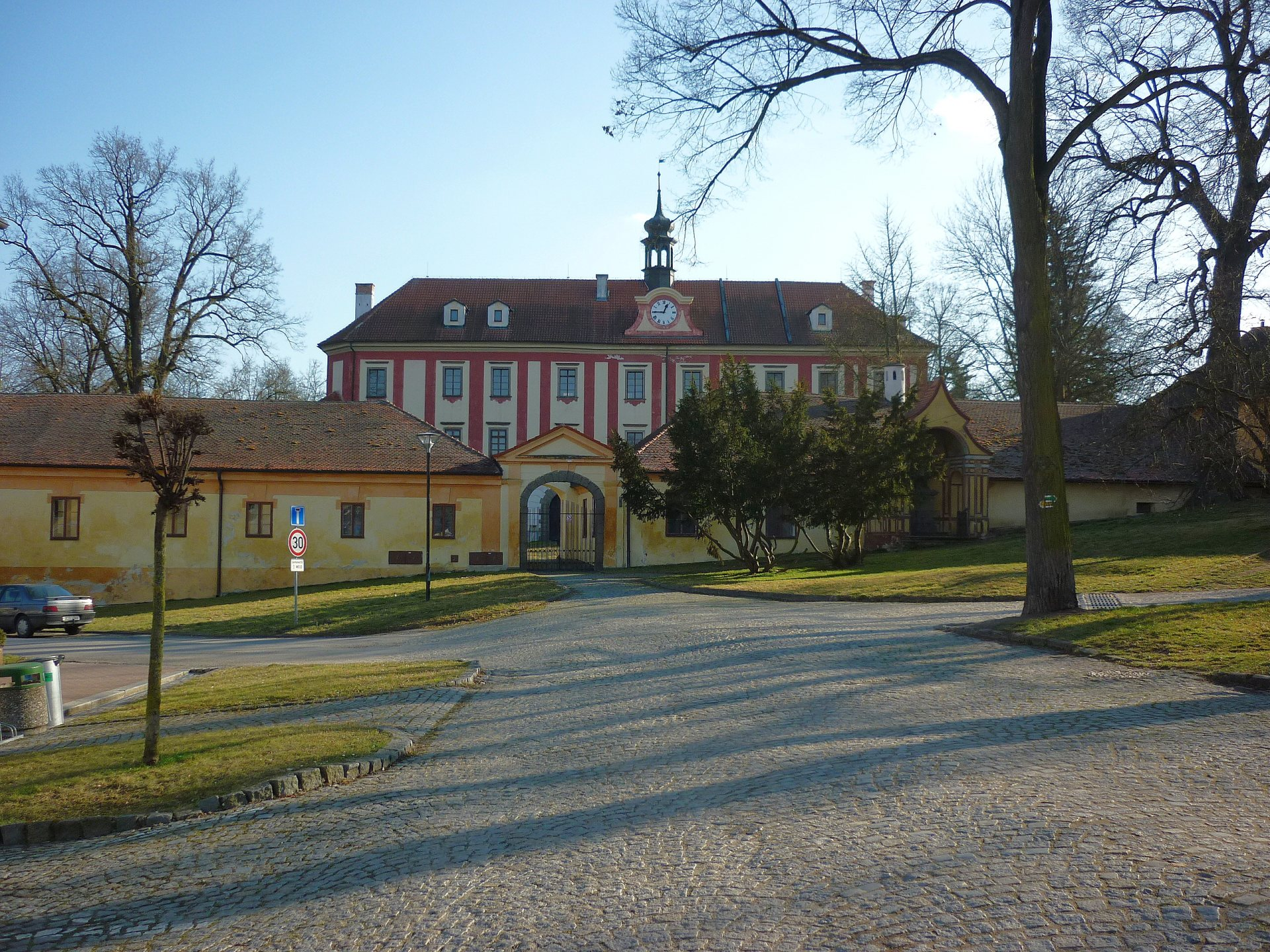
Protivín Castle

The town is known for the Protivín Brewery, which produces a regional beer label Platan. It was founded in 1598.

== Transport ==
The I/20 road (part of the European route E49) from České Budějovice to Plzeň and Karlovy Vary runs through the municipal territory.

Protivín is located on the main railway lines Prague–České Budějovice and Brno–Plzeň.

== Sights ==
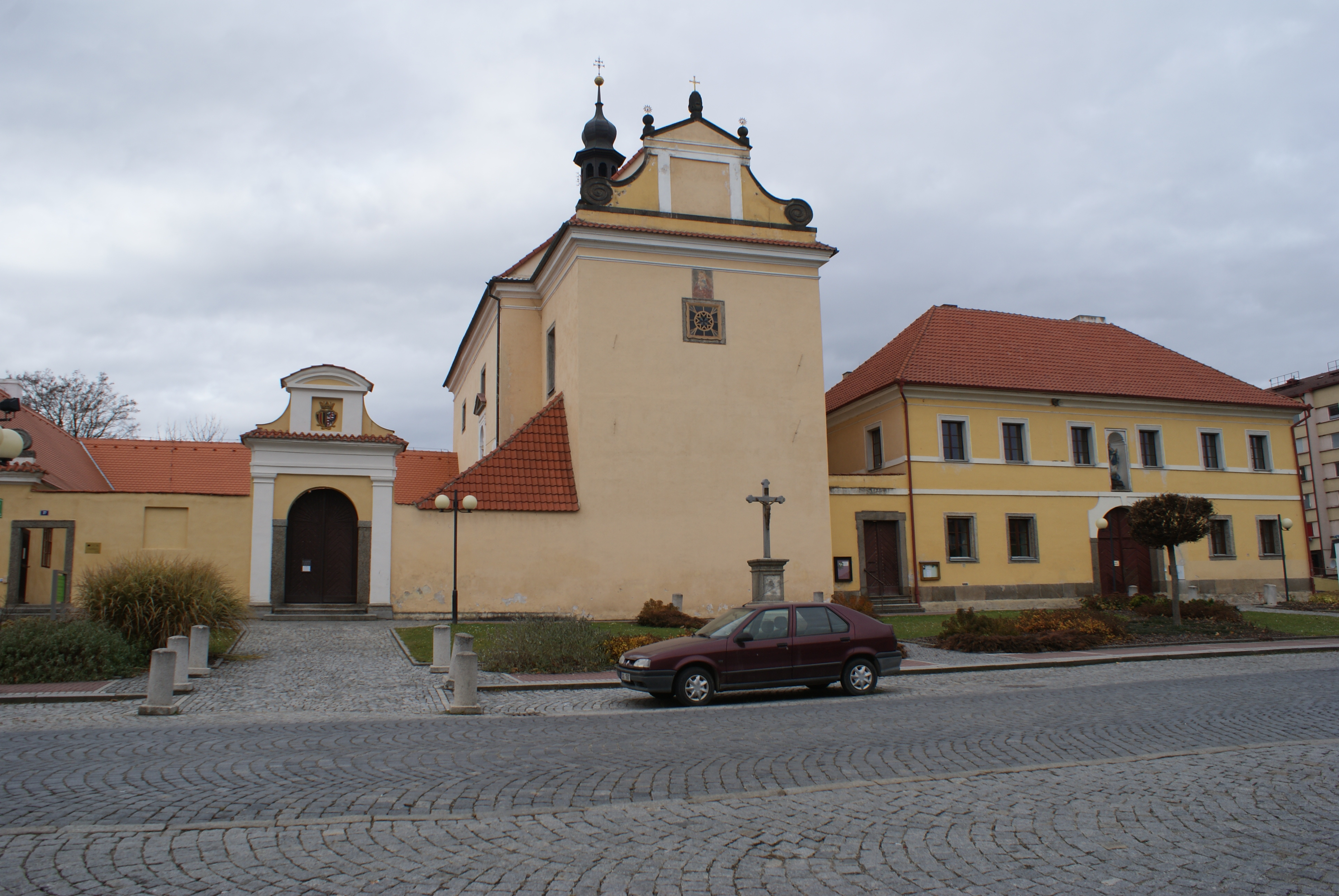
Church of Saint Elizabeth

There are three churches in the municipal territory. The Church of Saint Elizabeth on the town square was built in 1662 in the early Baroque style. The Church of Saint Gall in Myšenec is from the end of the 11th century and after several reconstructions it still retains its Gothic character. The Church of Saint Wenceslaus in Krč was built in 1352.

A Renaissance castle is located on the town square. It also includes a park with an area of 7.6 hectares (19 acres).

The Crocodile Zoo Protivín was established in 2008 and is unique by breeding of all of Crocodilia species.

== Notable people ==
- Ottokar Brzoza-Brzezina (1883–1968), Polish brigadier general
- Marta Krásová (1901–1970), opera singer
- Jiří Kolář (1914–2002), poet, writer, painter and translator

== Twin towns – sister cities ==
Protivín is twinned with:

- Blackwood, Wales, United Kingdom

== Gallery ==
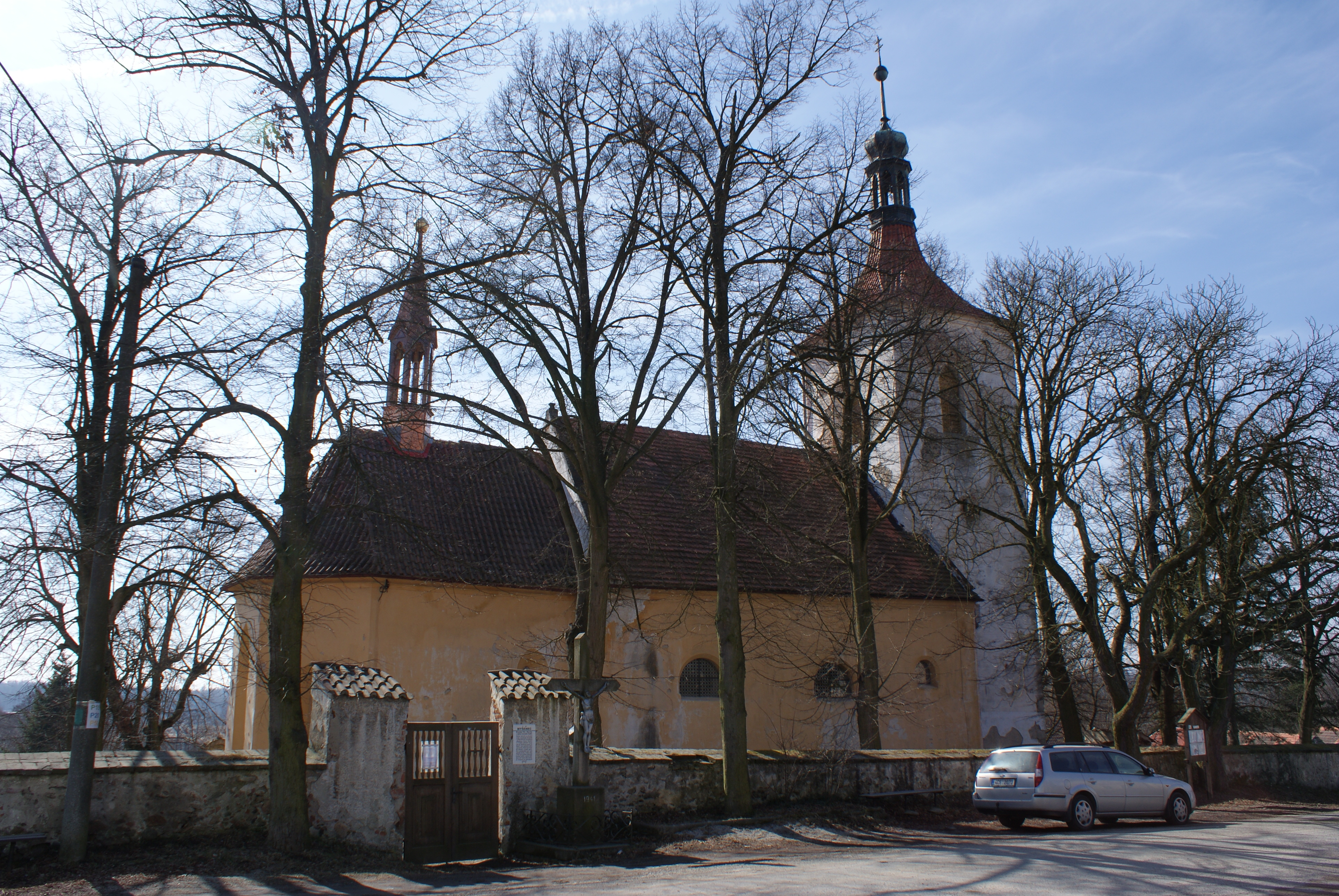
Church of Saint Gall in Myšenec

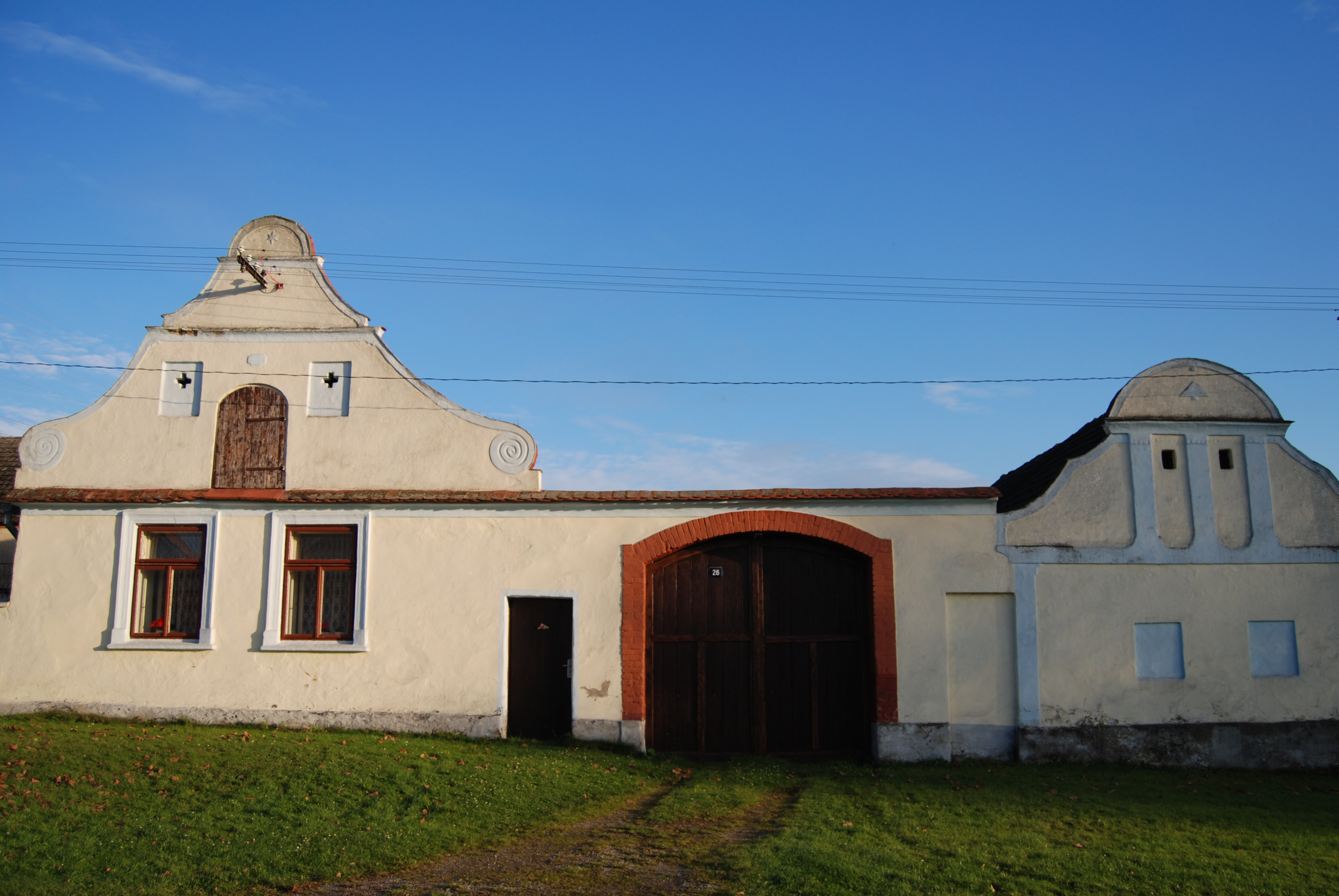
Folk baroque style architecture in Selibov

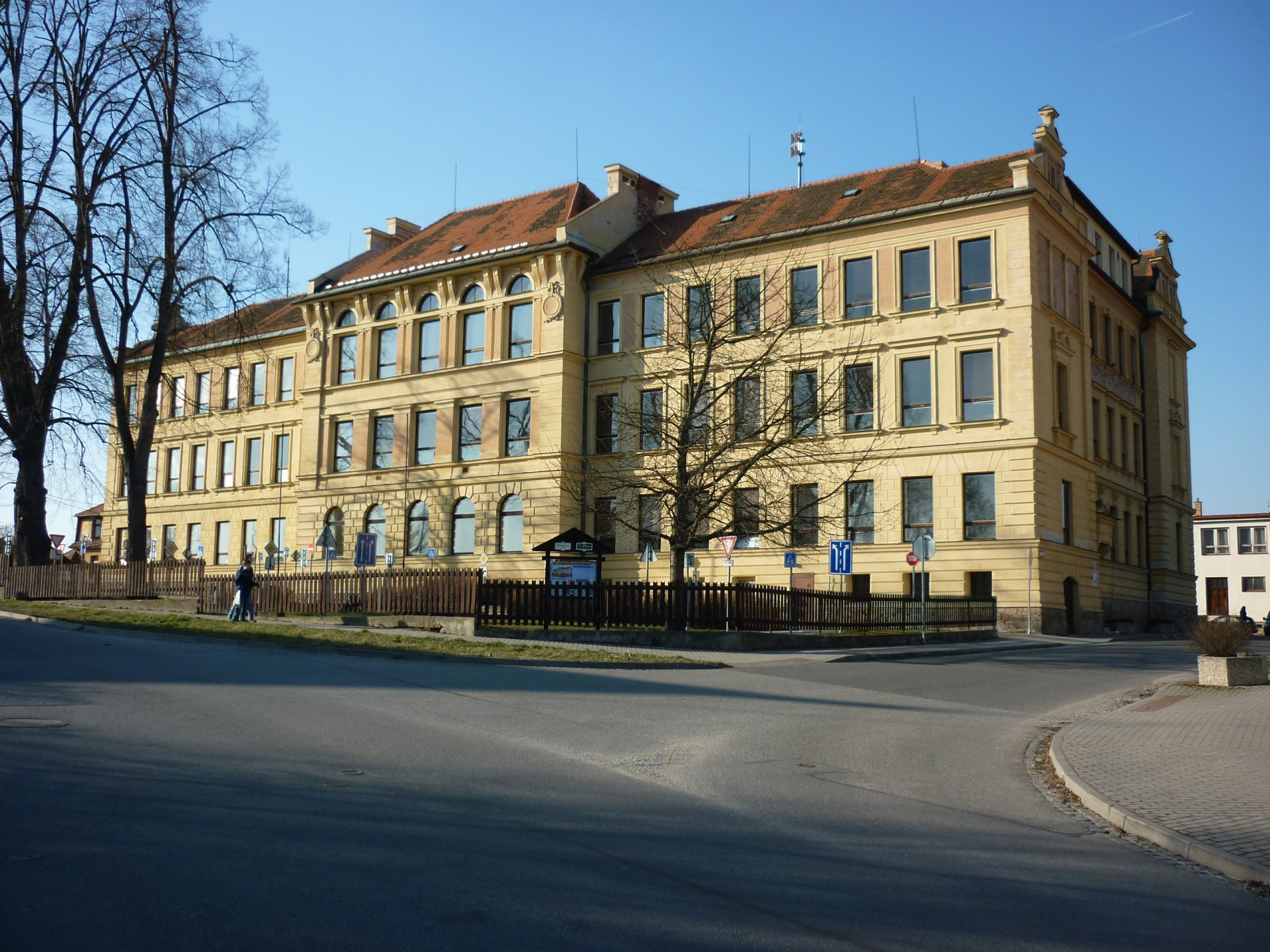
Primary school

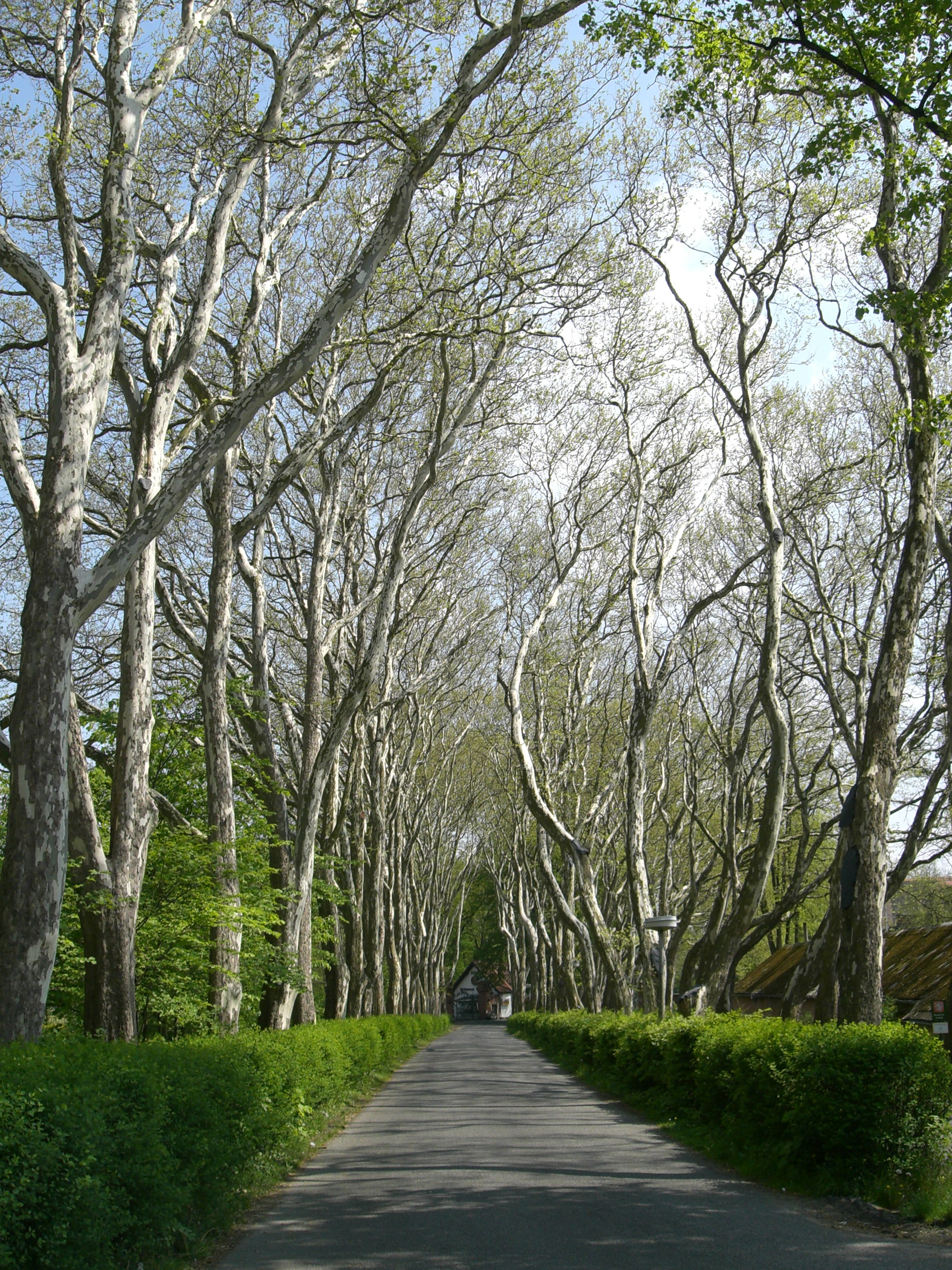
Platanus alley by the brewery
