= Zbytiny =

- Municipality
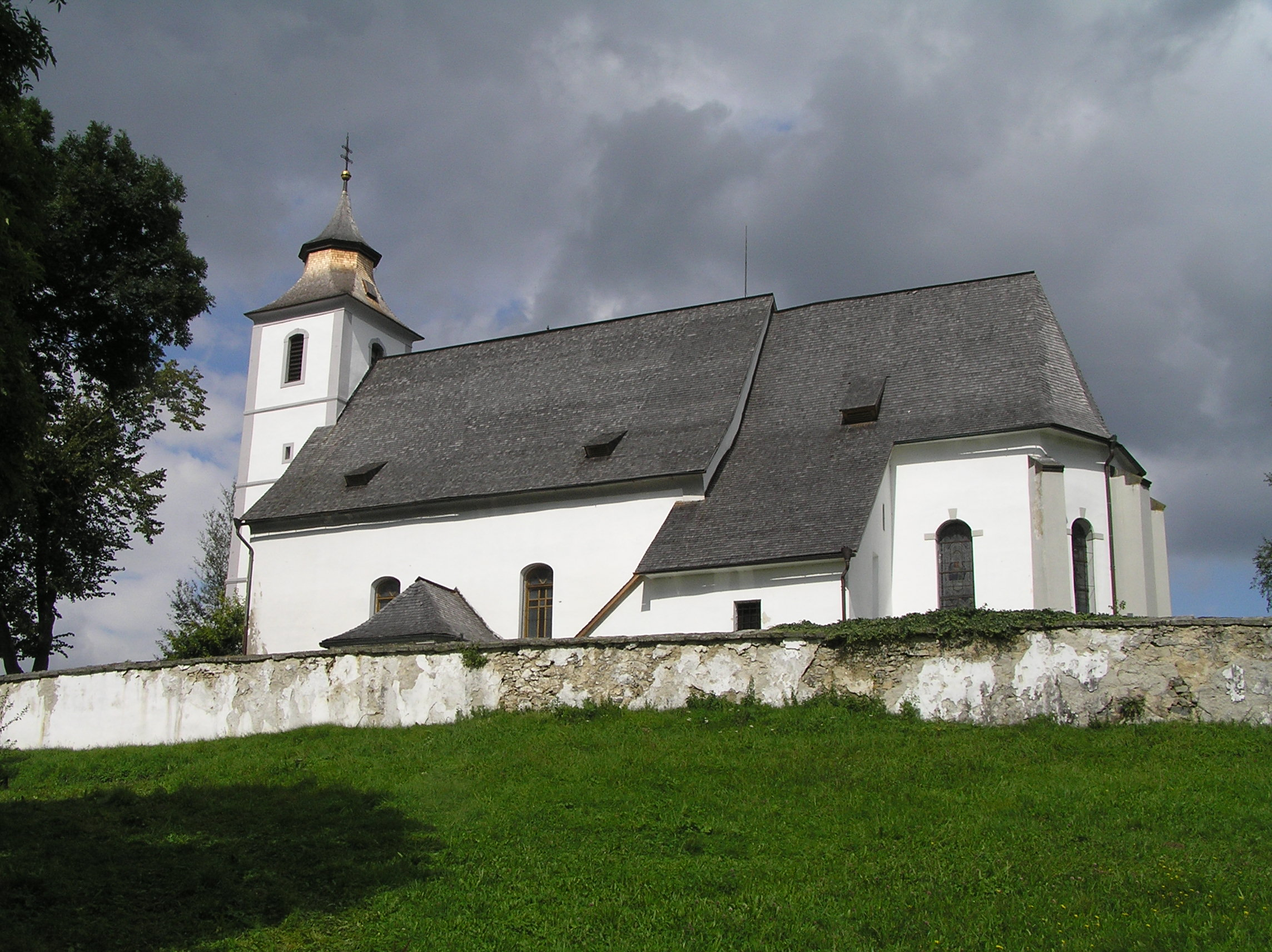
- Church of Saint Vitus

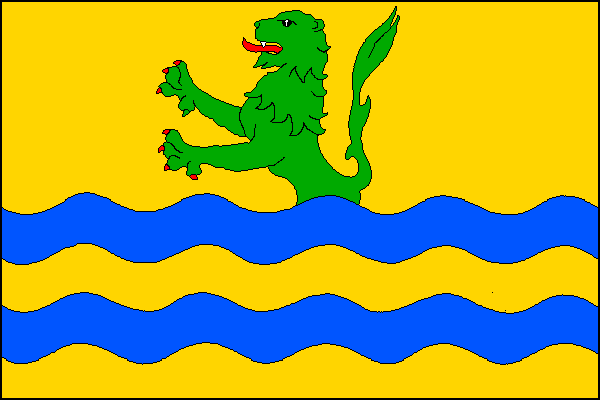
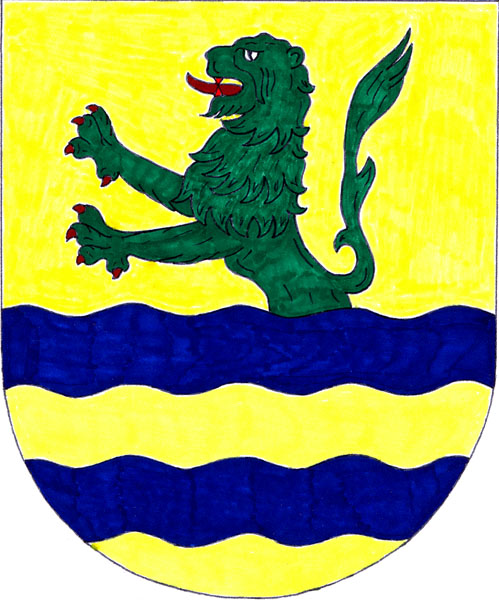
- Flag Coat of arms

- Location in the Czech Republic
- Coordinates: 48°56′34″N 13°58′41″E
- Country: Czech Republic
- Region: South Bohemian
- District: Prachatice
- First mentioned: 1388

Area
  - Total: 39.05 km^{2} (15.08 sq mi)
- Elevation: 786 m (2,579 ft)

Population (2026-01-01)
  - Total: 357
  - Density: 9.14/km^{2} (23.7/sq mi)
- Time zone: UTC+1 (CET)
  - Summer (DST): UTC+2 (CEST)
- Postal codes: 383 01, 384 41
- Website: www.zbytiny.cz

Zbytiny (German: Oberhaid) is a municipality and village in Prachatice District in the South Bohemian Region of the Czech Republic. It has about 400 inhabitants.

Zbytiny lies approximately 8 kilometres (5 mi) south of Prachatice, 37 km (23 mi) west of České Budějovice, and 131 km (81 mi) south of Prague.

== Administrative division ==
Zbytiny consists of six municipal parts (in brackets population according to the 2021 census):

- Zbytiny (210)
- Blažejovice (74)
- Koryto (41)
- Skříněřov (13)
- Spálenec (9)
- Sviňovice (7)

== Demographics ==
Historical population
Year	Pop.	±%
1869	1,779	—
1880	1,961	+10.2%
1890	1,838	−6.3%
1900	1,884	+2.5%
1910	1,833	−2.7%
1921	1,889	+3.1%
1930	1,877	−0.6%
1950	522	−72.2%
1961	476	−8.8%
1970	429	−9.9%
1980	394	−8.2%
1991	318	−19.3%
2001	300	−5.7%
2011	297	−1.0%
2021	354	+19.2%
Source: Censuses
