= Platan =

- Manufacturer: Pivovar Protivín, a.s.
- Distributor: Pivovary Lobkowicz Group, a.s.
- Country of origin: Czech Republic
- Introduced: 1598; 427 years ago
- Website: https://www.pivo-platan.cz/

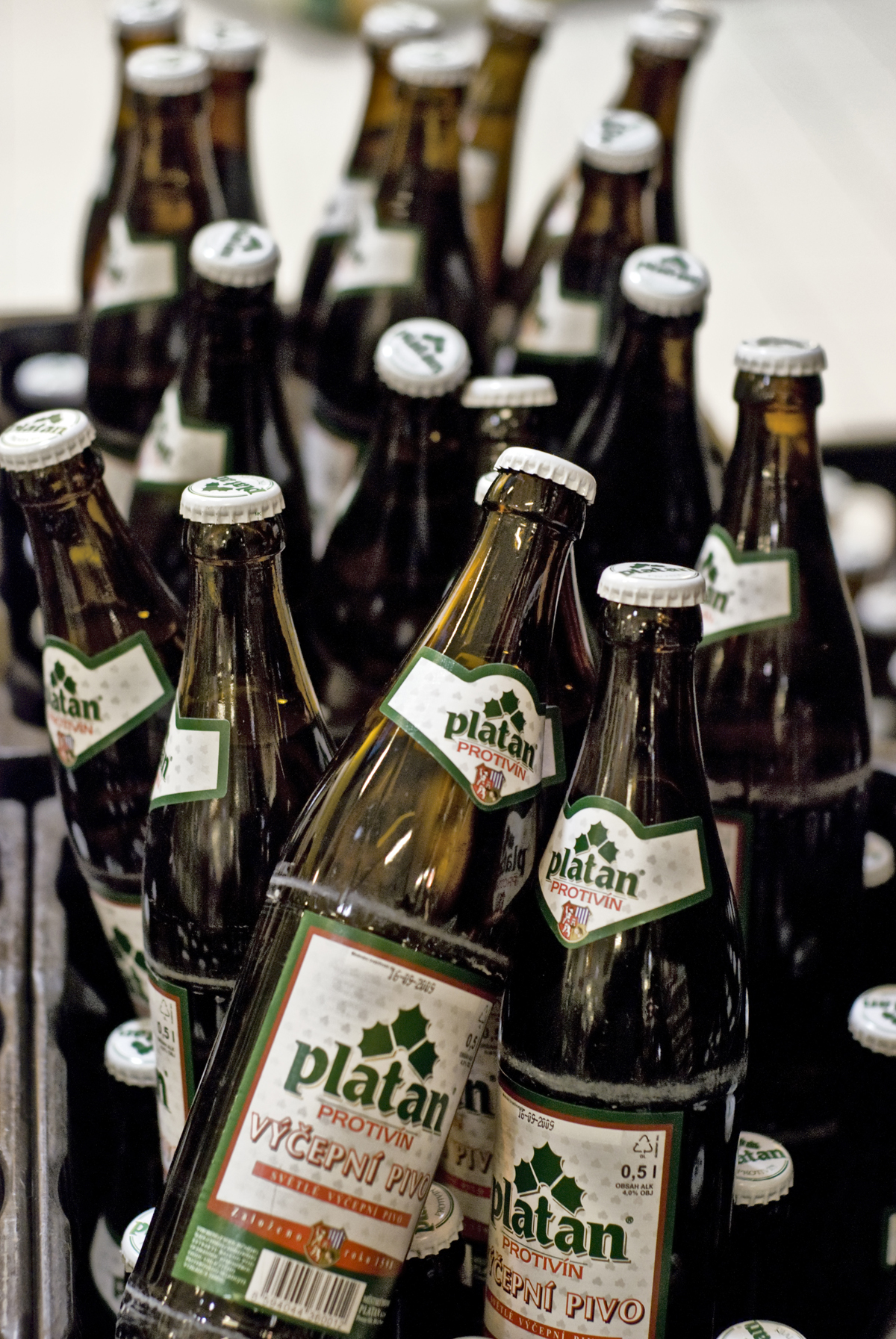
Platan beer

Platan is a brand of beer produced since 1598 in the Czech town of Protivín, South Bohemia.

== Types of Platan beer ==
- Platan Schwarzenbergské Pivo Knížecí 21 (10,6 % vol.), a strong lager.
- Platan Granát (4,6 % vol.), a Vienna lager.
- Platan Premium (5,0 % vol.), a lager.
- Platan Jedenáct (4,9 % vol.), a pale lager.
- Platan line (4,0 % vol.), a beer with reduced sugar content.
- Prácheňská perla – (6,0 % vol.), a Pilsner brewed in the traditional style of Prácheňsko.
- Platan Protivín (4,0 % vol.), draft lager.
- Platan Nealko, an alcohol-free beer.
