= Putim =

Municipality in the Czech Republic

- Municipality
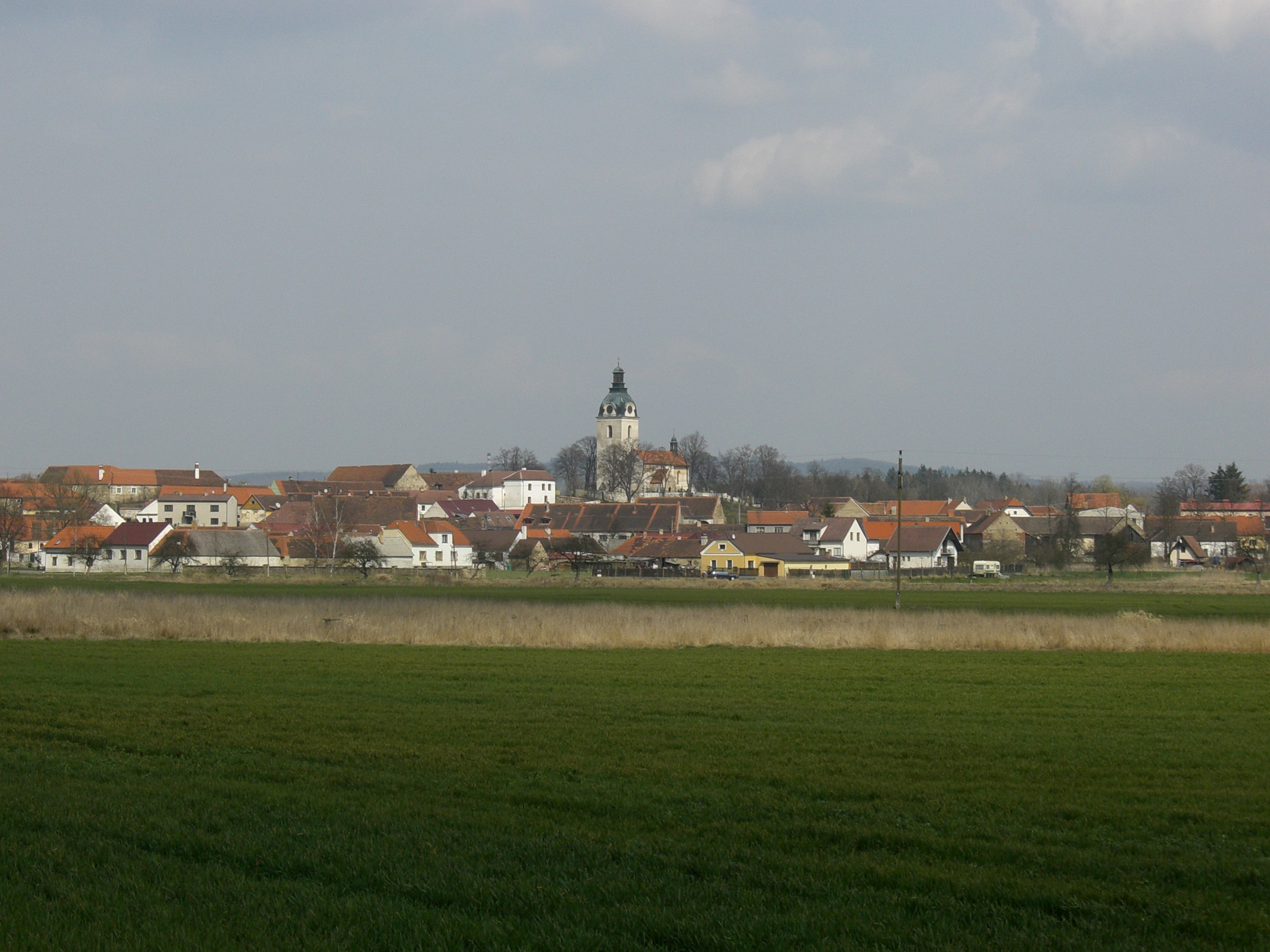
- General view

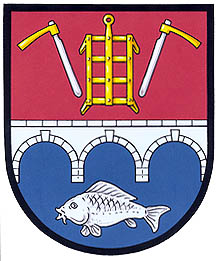
- Flag Coat of arms

- Location in the Czech Republic
- Coordinates: 49°15′53″N 14°7′9″E
- Country: Czech Republic
- Region: South Bohemian
- District: Písek
- First mentioned: 1205

Area
  - Total: 10.41 km^{2} (4.02 sq mi)
- Elevation: 386 m (1,266 ft)

Population (2026-01-01)
  - Total: 558
  - Density: 53.6/km^{2} (139/sq mi)
- Time zone: UTC+1 (CET)
  - Summer (DST): UTC+2 (CEST)
- Postal code: 397 01
- Website: www.putim.cz

Putim is a municipality and village in Písek District in the South Bohemian Region of the Czech Republic. It has about 600 inhabitants. The village centre is well preserved and is protected as a village monument zone.

== Etymology ==
The name is derived from the personal name Putim, meaning "Putim's (court)".

== Geography ==
Putim is located about 5 kilometres (3 mi) south of Písek and 40 km (25 mi) northwest of České Budějovice. It lies in the České Budějovice Basin. The highest point is the hill Zubovský vrch 442 m (1,450 ft) above sea level. The village is situated on the right bank of the Blanice River, on the shore of the fishpond Podkostelní rybník.

== History ==
Historically, the spot was inhabited sporadically first by Celtic tribes (2nd century BCE), then by Romans (1st century) and then subsequently by old Slavs during the 8th century. Since the 11th century, the area of the settlement has been permanently occupied. The first written mention of Putim is in a document from 1205, which mentions an older document probably from the period 1148–1158. From the 13th century, Putim was a property of the town of Písek. In 1650 and 1704, the village was destroyed by large fires.

== Demographics ==
Historical population

Year	Pop.	±%
1869	748	—
1880	831	+11.1%
1890	831	+0.0%
1900	853	+2.6%
1910	766	−10.2%

Year	Pop.	±%
1921	781	+2.0%
1930	763	−2.3%
1950	650	−14.8%
1961	675	+3.8%
1970	592	−12.3%

Year	Pop.	±%
1980	537	−9.3%
1991	442	−17.7%
2001	441	−0.2%
2011	484	+9.8%
2021	554	+14.5%

Source: Censuses

== Transport ==
Putim is located on the railway lines České Budějovice–Písek and Tábor–Strakonice.

== Sights ==
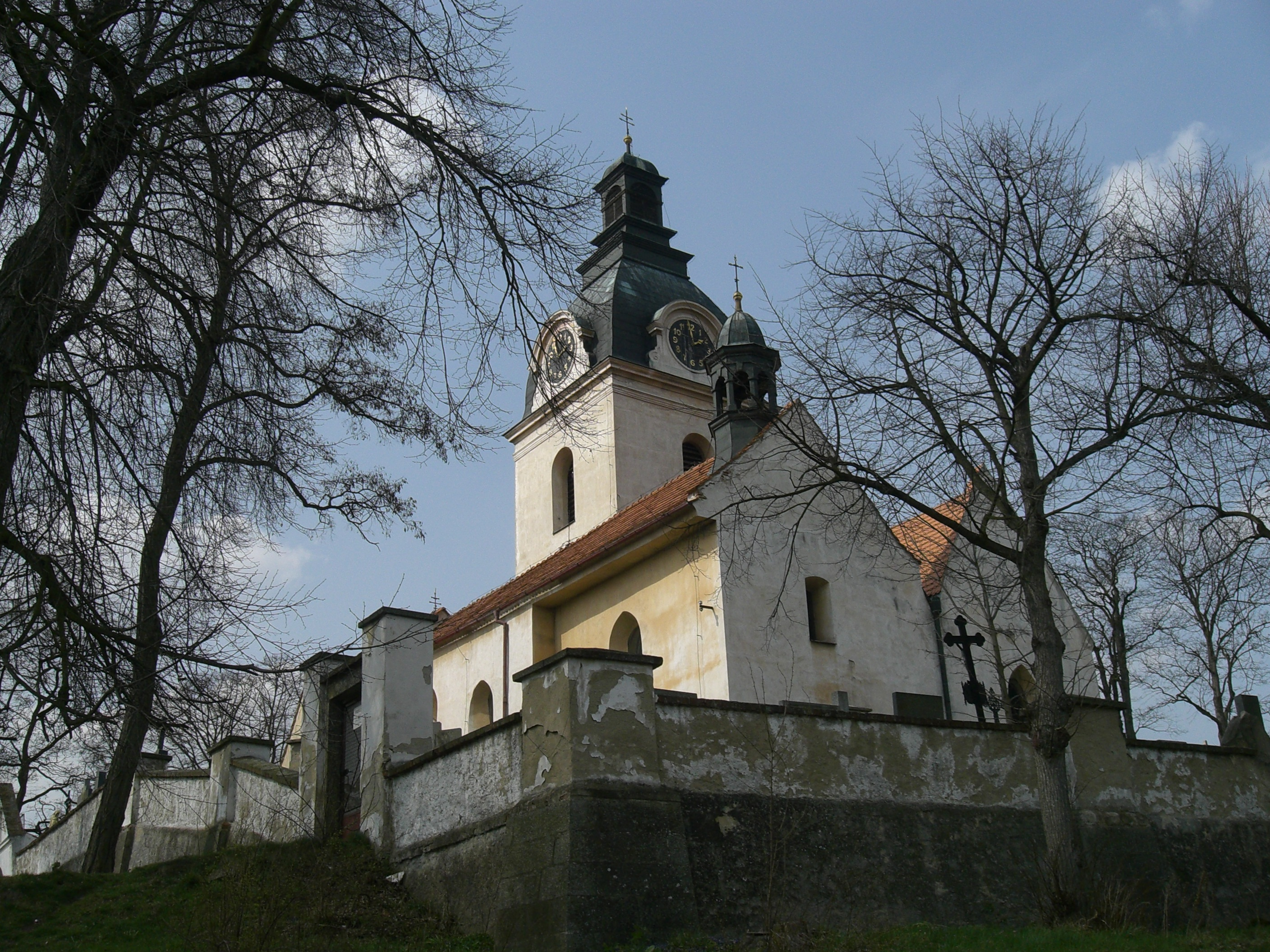
Church of Saint Lawrence

The main landmark of Putim is the Church of Saint Lawrence. It is an early Gothic building from the second half of the 13th century. There are several valuable houses built in the folk Baroque style.

== In literature ==
In one chapter of the novel The Good Soldier Švejk the author Jaroslav Hašek describes how Švejk in Putim meets up with a local gendarmerie officer, who is constantly drunk and who mistakes Švejk for a Russian spy. The first statue of Švejk in the Czech Republic was unveiled in Putim in 2014.

Putim was also nationwide popularised by the novel of Jindřich Šimon Baar Jan Cimbura.
