= Johann Pehel =

Czech/Austro-Hungarian composer

Jan Pehel (also Johann) (16 May 1852 in Husinec, Austrian Empire – 28 February 1926 in Prague, Czechoslovakia) was a Czech/Austro-Hungarian composer and conductor whose album of piano music Klänge von der Moldau ("Echoes from Bohemia") appeared as No. 1433 in the Collection Litolff. His '74-er Korps-Manöver-Marsch' appears on Militärmusik Salzburg's CD Historische Regiments-Märsche der k. u. k. Armee. He was born in Husinec, and died in Prague.
