= Záblatí (Prachatice District) =

- Municipality
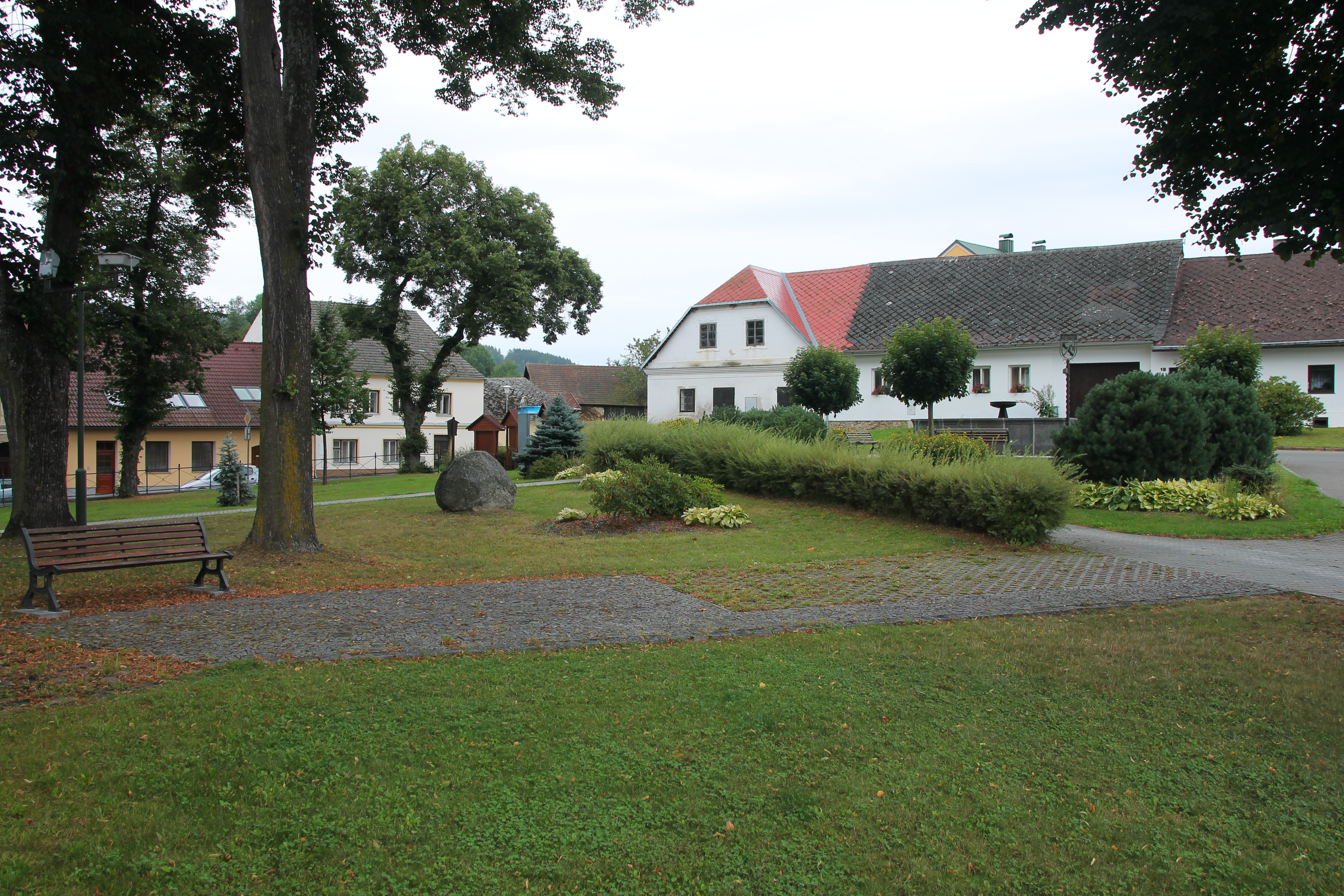
- Centre of Záblatí

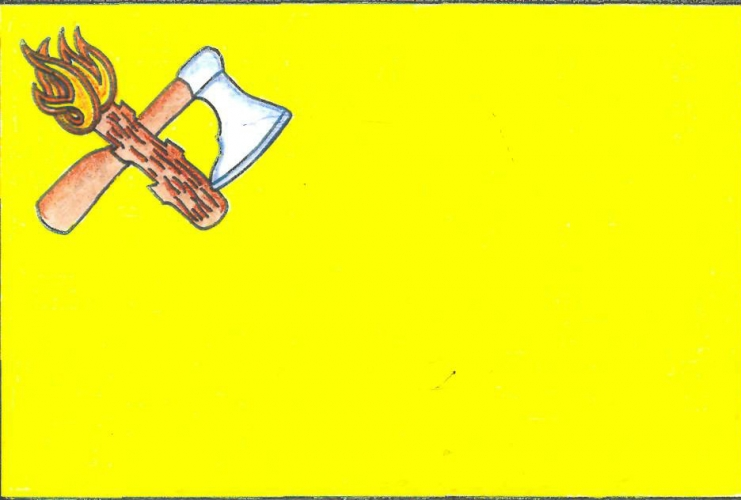
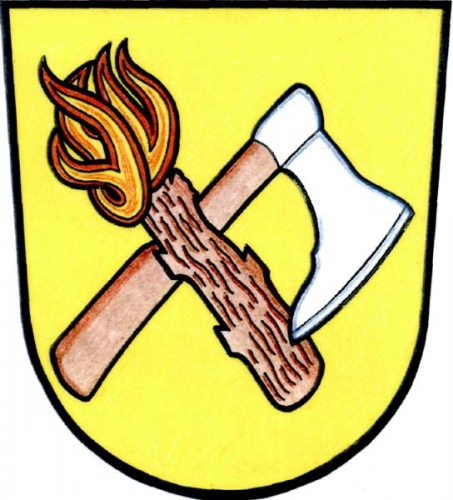
- Flag Coat of arms

- Location in the Czech Republic
- Coordinates: 48°59′55″N 13°55′53″E
- Country: Czech Republic
- Region: South Bohemian
- District: Prachatice
- First mentioned: 1337

Area
  - Total: 24.48 km^{2} (9.45 sq mi)
- Elevation: 593 m (1,946 ft)

Population (2026-01-01)
  - Total: 335
  - Density: 13.7/km^{2} (35.4/sq mi)
- Time zone: UTC+1 (CET)
  - Summer (DST): UTC+2 (CEST)
- Postal codes: 383 01, 384 33
- Website: www.obeczablati.cz

Záblatí (German: Sablat) is a municipality and village in Prachatice District in the South Bohemian Region of the Czech Republic. It has about 300 inhabitants.

Záblatí lies approximately 5 kilometres (3 mi) south-west of Prachatice, 39 km (24 mi) west of České Budějovice, and 127 km (79 mi) south of Prague.

== Administrative division ==
Záblatí consists of eight municipal parts (in brackets population according to the 2021 census):

- Záblatí (188)
- Albrechtovice (2)
- Hlásná Lhota (24)
- Horní Záblatí (44)
- Křišťanovice (10)
- Řepešín (34)
- Saladín (5)
- Zvěřenice (13)

== Demographics ==
Historical population
Year	Pop.	±%
1869	2,203	—
1880	2,256	+2.4%
1890	2,067	−8.4%
1900	2,015	−2.5%
1910	1,925	−4.5%
1921	1,817	−5.6%
1930	1,705	−6.2%
1950	626	−63.3%
1961	641	+2.4%
1970	447	−30.3%
1980	379	−15.2%
1991	347	−8.4%
2001	352	+1.4%
2011	360	+2.3%
2021	320	−11.1%
Source: Censuses
