= Hájek (Strakonice District) =

- Municipality
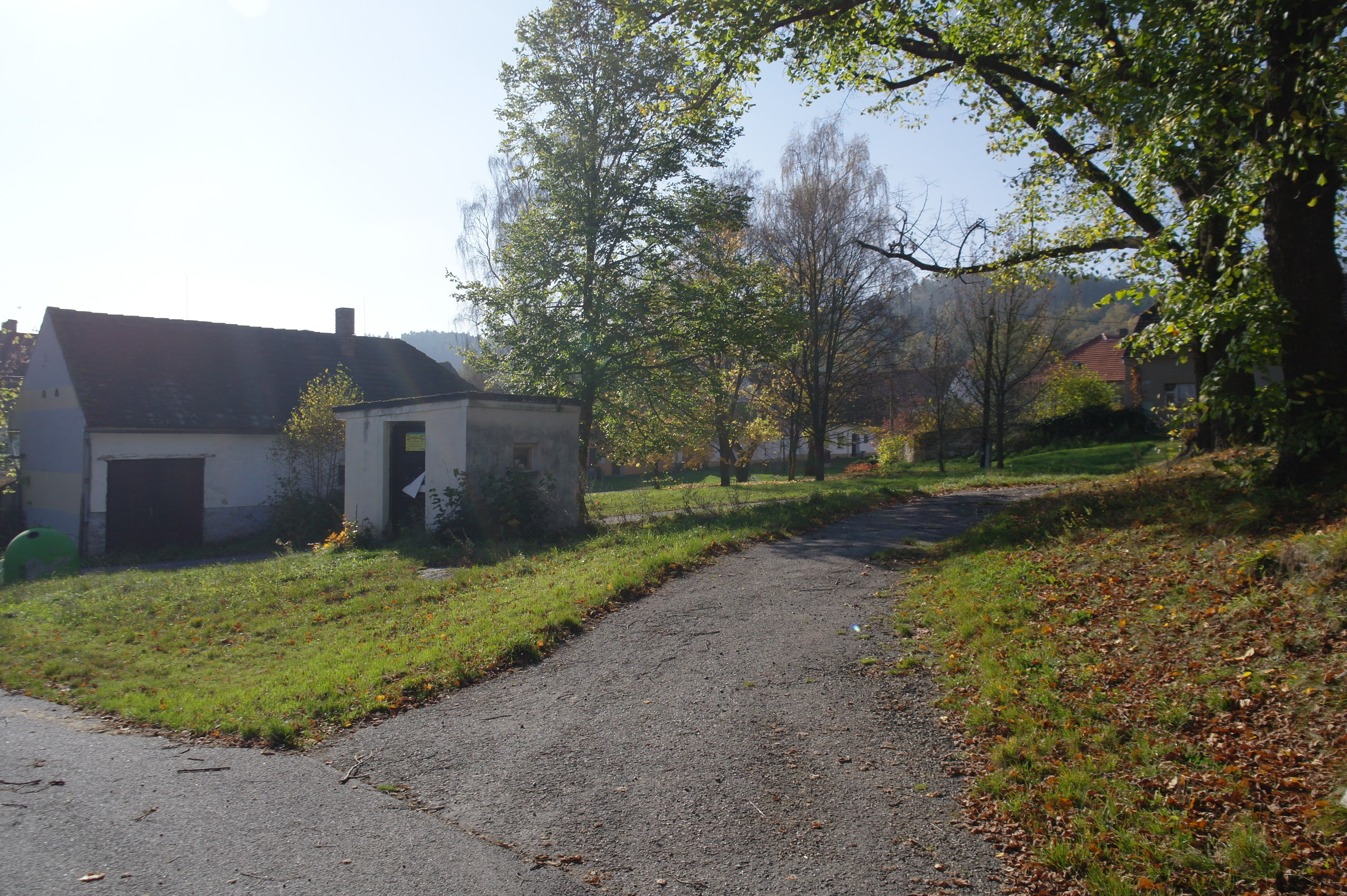
- Centre of Hájek

- Location in the Czech Republic
- Coordinates: 49°6′40″N 14°3′40″E
- Country: Czech Republic
- Region: South Bohemian
- District: Strakonice
- First mentioned: 1334

Area
  - Total: 2.80 km^{2} (1.08 sq mi)
- Elevation: 460 m (1,510 ft)

Population (2026-01-01)
  - Total: 43
  - Density: 15/km^{2} (40/sq mi)
- Time zone: UTC+1 (CET)
  - Summer (DST): UTC+2 (CEST)
- Postal code: 387 73
- Website: obec-hajek.estranky.cz

Hájek is a municipality and village in Strakonice District in the South Bohemian Region of the Czech Republic. It has about 40 inhabitants.

Hájek lies approximately 21 kilometres (13 mi) south-east of Strakonice, 34 km (21 mi) north-west of České Budějovice, and 112 km (70 mi) south of Prague.

== Demographics ==
Historical population
Year	Pop.	±%
1869	117	—
1880	140	+19.7%
1890	129	−7.9%
1900	147	+14.0%
1910	153	+4.1%
1921	145	−5.2%
1930	131	−9.7%
1950	86	−34.4%
1961	83	−3.5%
1970	56	−32.5%
1980	47	−16.1%
1991	36	−23.4%
2001	38	+5.6%
2011	35	−7.9%
2021	45	+28.6%
Source: Censuses
