= Číčenice =

- Municipality
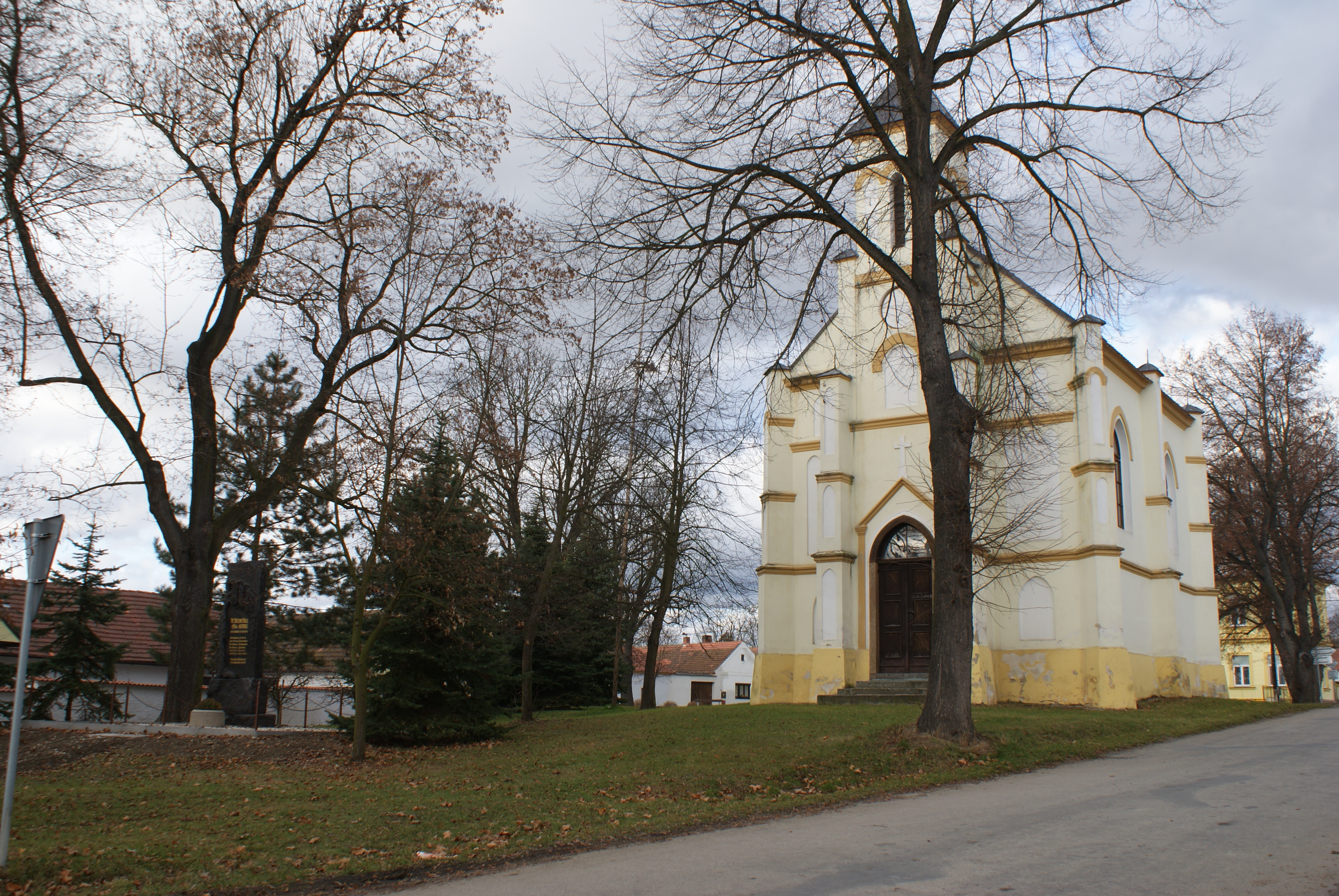
- Church of Saint Wenceslaus in the centre

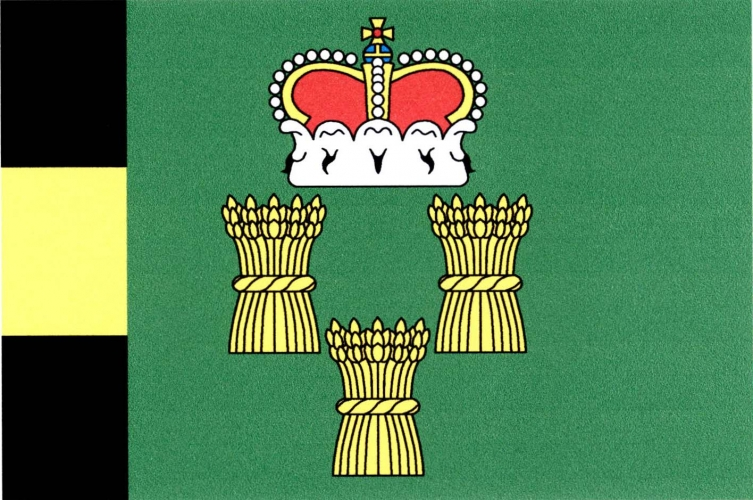
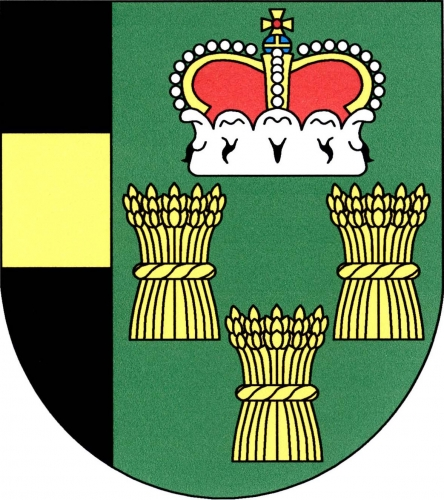
- Flag Coat of arms

- Location in the Czech Republic
- Coordinates: 49°9′11″N 14°13′51″E
- Country: Czech Republic
- Region: South Bohemian
- District: Strakonice
- First mentioned: 1335

Area
  - Total: 11.95 km^{2} (4.61 sq mi)
- Elevation: 404 m (1,325 ft)

Population (2026-01-01)
  - Total: 486
  - Density: 40.7/km^{2} (105/sq mi)
- Time zone: UTC+1 (CET)
  - Summer (DST): UTC+2 (CEST)
- Postal code: 389 01
- Website: www.cicenice.cz

Číčenice is a municipality and village in Strakonice District in the South Bohemian Region of the Czech Republic. It has about 500 inhabitants.

== Administrative division ==
Číčenice consists of three municipal parts (in brackets population according to the 2021 census):

- Číčenice (356)
- Strpí (34)
- Újezdec (39)

== Geography ==
Číčenice is located about 26 kilometres (16 mi) southeast of Strakonice and 26 km (16 mi) northwest of České Budějovice. It lies in the České Budějovice Basin. The highest point is a flat hill, also called Číčenice, at 449 m (1,473 ft) above sea level. There are several fishponds in the territory.

== History ==
The first written mention of Číčenice is from 1335.

== Demographics ==
Historical population

| Year | Pop. | ±% |
|---|---|---|
| 1869 | 508 | — |
| 1880 | 649 | +27.8% |
| 1890 | 599 | −7.7% |
| 1900 | 637 | +6.3% |
| 1910 | 709 | +11.3% |

| Year | Pop. | ±% |
|---|---|---|
| 1921 | 796 | +12.3% |
| 1930 | 771 | −3.1% |
| 1950 | 606 | −21.4% |
| 1961 | 565 | −6.8% |
| 1970 | 503 | −11.0% |

| Year | Pop. | ±% |
|---|---|---|
| 1980 | 529 | +5.2% |
| 1991 | 458 | −13.4% |
| 2001 | 453 | −1.1% |
| 2011 | 462 | +2.0% |
| 2021 | 429 | −7.1% |

Source: Censuses

== Transport ==
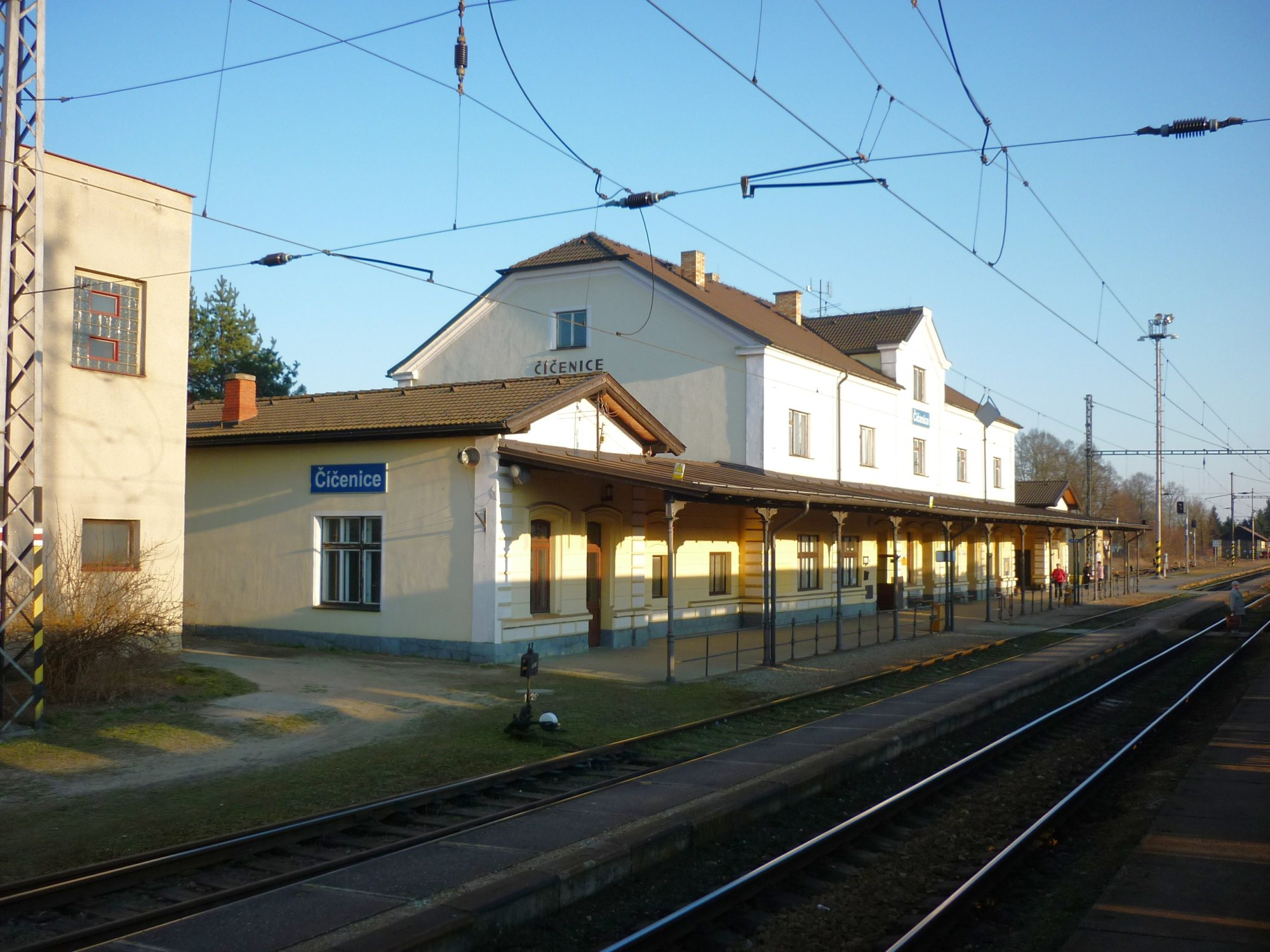
Číčenice railway station

The Číčenice railway station is an important junction of the railways České Budějovice–Plzeň and Číčenice–Nové Údolí. The municipality is served by two train stations: Číčenice and Újezdec u Číčenic.

== Sights ==
The main landmark of Číčenice is the Church of Saint Wenceslaus. It was built in the neo-Gothic style in 1888.
