= Prachatice =

- Town
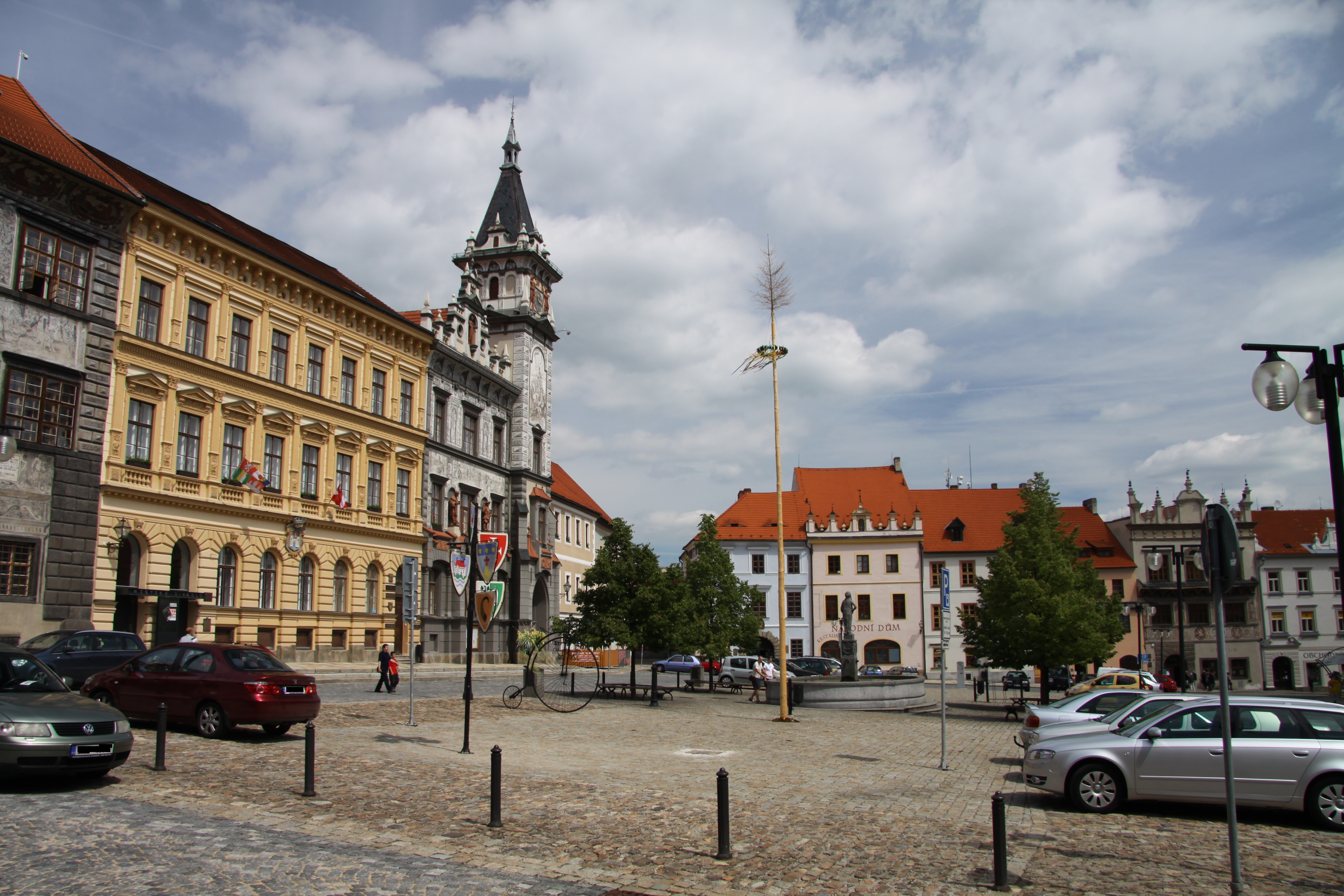
- Town square with the town hall

- Flag Coat of arms

- Location in the Czech Republic
- Coordinates: 49°0′47″N 13°59′51″E
- Country: Czech Republic
- Region: South Bohemian
- District: Prachatice
- First mentioned: 1300

Government
  - Mayor: Martin Malý

Area
  - Total: 38.92 km^{2} (15.03 sq mi)
- Elevation: 561 m (1,841 ft)

Population (2026-01-01)
  - Total: 11,036
  - Density: 283.6/km^{2} (734.4/sq mi)
- Time zone: UTC+1 (CET)
  - Summer (DST): UTC+2 (CEST)
- Postal code: 383 01
- Website: www.prachatice.eu

Prachatice (Czech pronunciation: [ˈpraxacɪtsɛ]; German: Prachatitz) is a town in the South Bohemian Region of the Czech Republic. It has about 11,000 inhabitants. The town is located in a hilly landscape in the Bohemian Forest Foothills.

Among the notable owners of the town were the noble families of Rosenberg (1501–1601), Eggenberg (1621–1719) and Schwarzenberg (1719–1848). The town has many Renaissance monuments. The historic town centre is well preserved and is protected as an urban monument reservation.

== Administrative division ==
Prachatice consists of 12 municipal parts (in brackets population according to the 2021 census):

- Prachatice I (767)
- Prachatice II (9,136)
- Kahov (44)
- Libínské Sedlo (105)
- Městská Lhotka (9)
- Oseky (87)
- Ostrov (109)
- Perlovice (24)
- Podolí (26)
- Stádla (5)
- Staré Prachatice (114)
- Volovice (14)

== Etymology ==
The name is derived from the old Slavic personal name Prachata, meaning "the village of Prachata's people".

== Geography ==
Prachatice is located about 34 kilometres (21 mi) west of České Budějovice. It lies in the Bohemian Forest Foothills. The highest point is the Libín mountain at 1,093 m (3,586 ft) above sea level. The stream of Živný potok flows through the town. The Blanice River flows along the northwestern municipal border.

== History ==
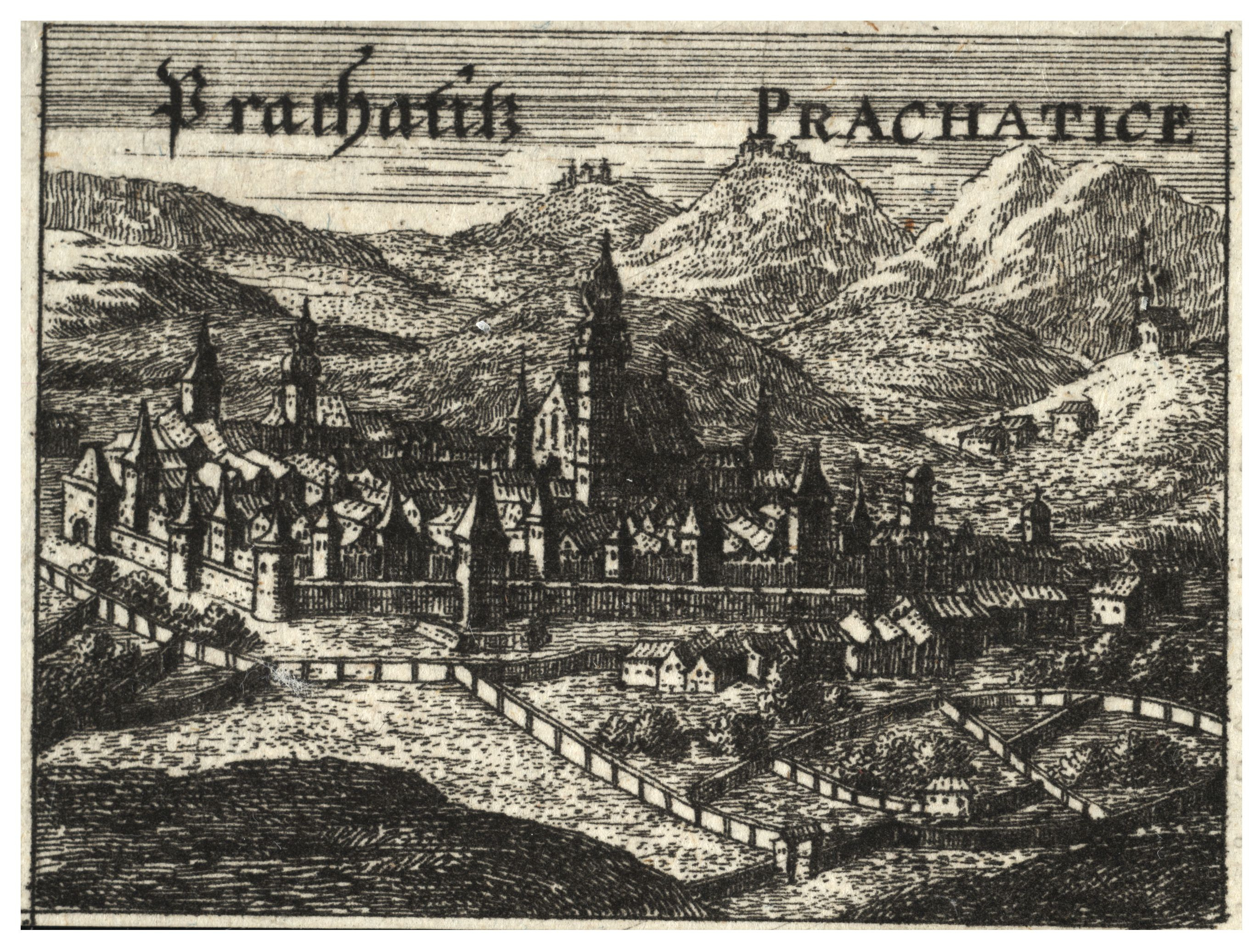
Engraving from the 17th century

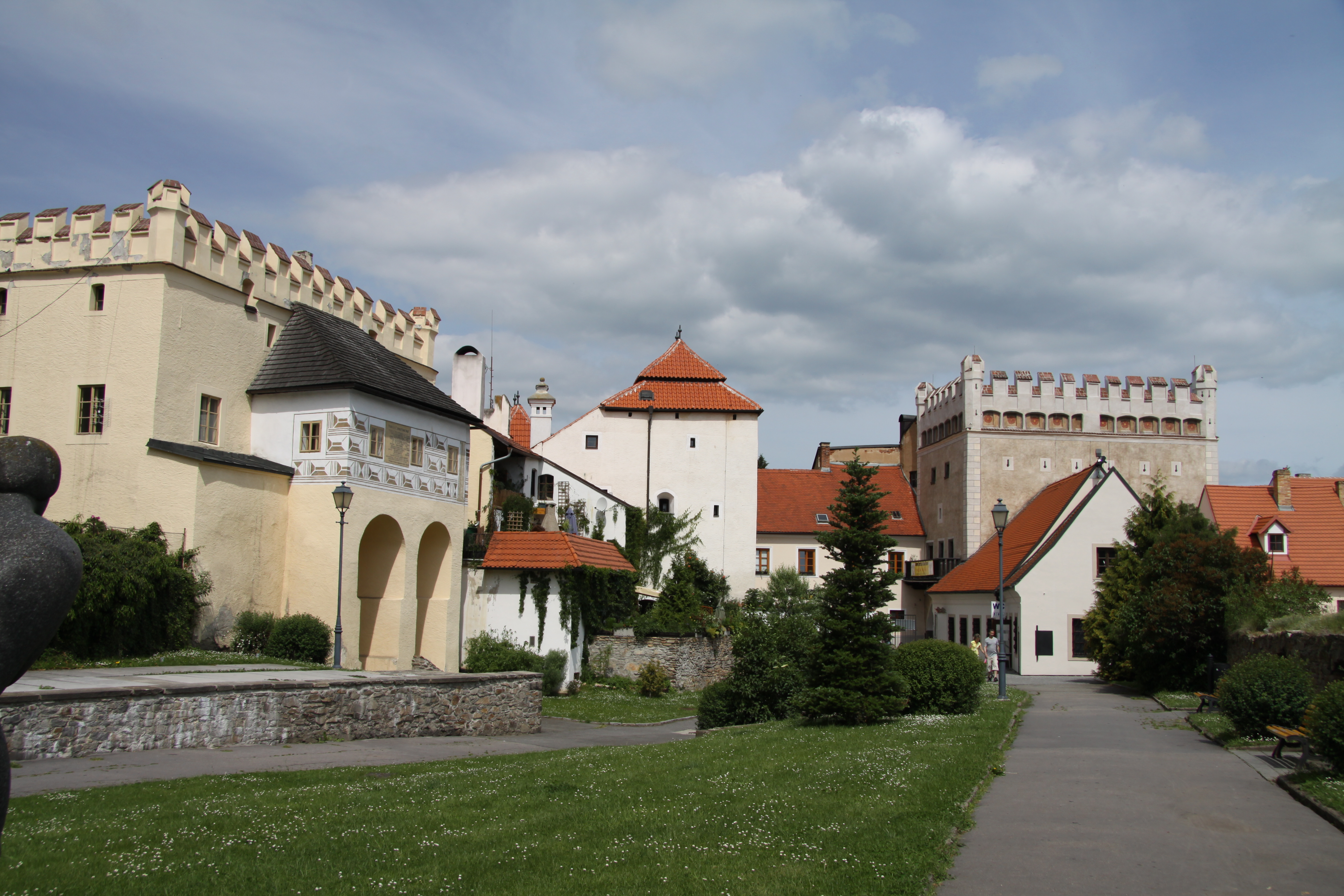
Remains of the town fortifications

=== 9th–15th centuries ===
Prachatice was founded with the beginning of trade on the Golden Trail, an important salt trade route beginning in Passau, Bavaria. Probably in the 9th or 10th century, a settlement was founded in the area of today's Staré Prachatice ("Old Prachatice") town part. In the second half of the 12th century, it was acquired by the Vyšehrad Chapter.

When the settlement ceased to suit its purpose, a new settlement was established near the old one at the end of the 13th century. In 1312, Prachatice was first referred to as a town. In 1323, King John of Bohemia confirmed to the town of Prachatice the right to use the trade route to Passau and to collect customs duties there. Prachatice was fully completed in the 3rd quarter of the 14th century.

During the Hussite Wars in the 15th century, Prachatice was attacked twice, It was eventually conquered by the Hussites, who killed most of the population. In 1436, after the end of the conflict, Prachatice was granted the status of royal town by King Sigismund, and all its old privileges were confirmed. Only one year later, the town was offered as collateral to Jan Smil of Krems, but it fell under the control of the Rosenberg family for a short period following Smil's execution in 1439 at Český Krumlov. Oldřich II of Rosenberg sold the town almost immediately after the execution, but it again became property of the family in 1501. In the second half of the 15th century, the number of inhabitants increased, and new houses had to be built.

=== 16th–20th centuries ===
In the 16th century, trade on the trail reached its peak and the town prospered. The Rosenbergs controlled Prachatice until 1601 when Peter Vok of Rosenberg, the last member of the family, sold the town to Emperor Rudolf II who would again make it a royal town in 1609. It remained firmly under royal control until the Bohemian Revolt during which it sided with the rebels. However, in 1620, the town was reconquered and connected to the Český Krumlov estate. After the Battle of White Mountain, Prachatice lost its royal town status and privileges and became the property of the Eggenberg family though the emperor's troops remained in the town throughout the remainder of the Thirty Years' War. Later in the war, the town was conquered by the Swedish army, and another large ransom was demanded. In the second half of the 17th century, trade on the Golden Trail declined and never revived.

The town and the whole Český Krumlov estate changed hands again in 1719, following the death of Princess Marie Arnoštka of Eggenberg and came under the control of the affluent Schwarzenberg family. The weak political and economic situation affected the condition of the houses. Old ones were not reconstructed, and new ones were not built.

Until 1918, the town was part of Austria-Hungary, in the district of the same name, one of the 94 Bezirkshauptmannschaften in Bohemia.

After 1945, the German population was expelled as a result of World War II.

== Demographics ==
Historical population

Year	Pop.	±%
1869	4,911	—
1880	5,682	+15.7%
1890	5,363	−5.6%
1900	5,573	+3.9%
1910	5,779	+3.7%

Year	Pop.	±%
1921	5,482	−5.1%
1930	5,926	+8.1%
1950	5,130	−13.4%
1961	5,381	+4.9%
1970	7,100	+31.9%

Year	Pop.	±%
1980	10,354	+45.8%
1991	11,805	+14.0%
2001	11,843	+0.3%
2011	11,203	−5.4%
2021	10,440	−6.8%

Source: Censuses

== Economy ==
There are no large industrial companies. The largest employer based in the town is the hospital. The largest industrial employers are the companies InTiCa Systems (manufacturer of electronic components) and Reinfurt-ČR (manufacturer of ball bearings), both with more than 250 employees.

== Transport ==
There are no major roads passing through the town. The second-class roads connects Prachatice with České Budějovice, Vodňany and Volary.

Prachatice is located on the railway line Číčenice–Nové Údolí.

== Culture ==
Prachatice hosts the Golden Salt Path Celebrations every year with a rich cultural program.

== Sights ==
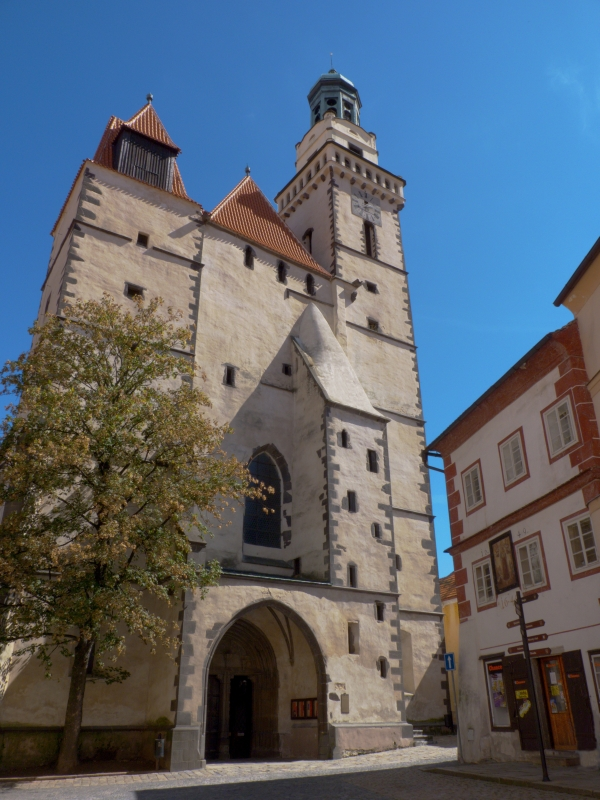
Church of Saint James the Great

The historic centre is formed by the square Velké náměstí and adjoining streets, and is delimited by the remains of the town walls. Due to the stagnation of economic life in the 17th and 18th centuries, Prachatice has many Renaissance buildings, some of then reconstructed in the Empire style. Since 1981, the historic core of the town has been protected as an urban monument reservation.

One of the main landmarks of the town centre is the Old Town Hall, a Renaissance house built in 1570–1571. The New Town Hall was built in the pseudo-Renaissance style in 1903.

The Church of Saint James the Great near the square is the largest building in the historic centre. It is a late Gothic building first mentioned in 1359. Its final form was achieved by reconstructions between 1505 and 1513.

Dolní brána (lit. 'lower gate'; also called Písecká brána) is a preserved element of the stone town fortifications, which dates from the first half of the 15th century. The gate is from around 1527 and creates the entrance to the historic centre.

== Notable people ==
- Christian of Prachatice (c. 1368–1439), astronomer, mathematician and medic
- Jan Hus (c. 1372–1415), theologian, philosopher and reformer; studied here
- John Neumann (1811–1860), American Roman Catholic prelate and saint
- Josef Beneš (1902–1984), linguist
- Miroslav Soukup (born 1965), football player and manager
- Adolf Zika (born 1972), photographer
- David Horejš (born 1977), football player and manager
- Kateřina Nash (born 1977), cross-country skier and cyclist
- Lucie Sekanová (born 1989), athlete

== Twin towns – sister cities ==
Prachatice is twinned with:

- Akhmeta, Georgia
- Castrocaro Terme e Terra del Sole, Italy
- Grainet, Germany
- Ignalina, Lithuania
- Impruneta, Italy
- Mauthausen, Austria
- Waldkirchen, Germany
- Zvolen, Slovakia
