= Radošovice =

Radošovice may refer to places in the Czech Republic:

- Radošovice (Benešov District), a municipality and village in the Central Bohemian Region
- Radošovice (České Budějovice District), a municipality and village in the South Bohemian Region
- Radošovice (Strakonice District), a municipality and village in the South Bohemian Region
- Radošovice, a village and part of Bystřice (Benešov District) in the Central Bohemian Region
- Radošovice, a part of Říčany in the Central Bohemian Region
