= Volyňka =

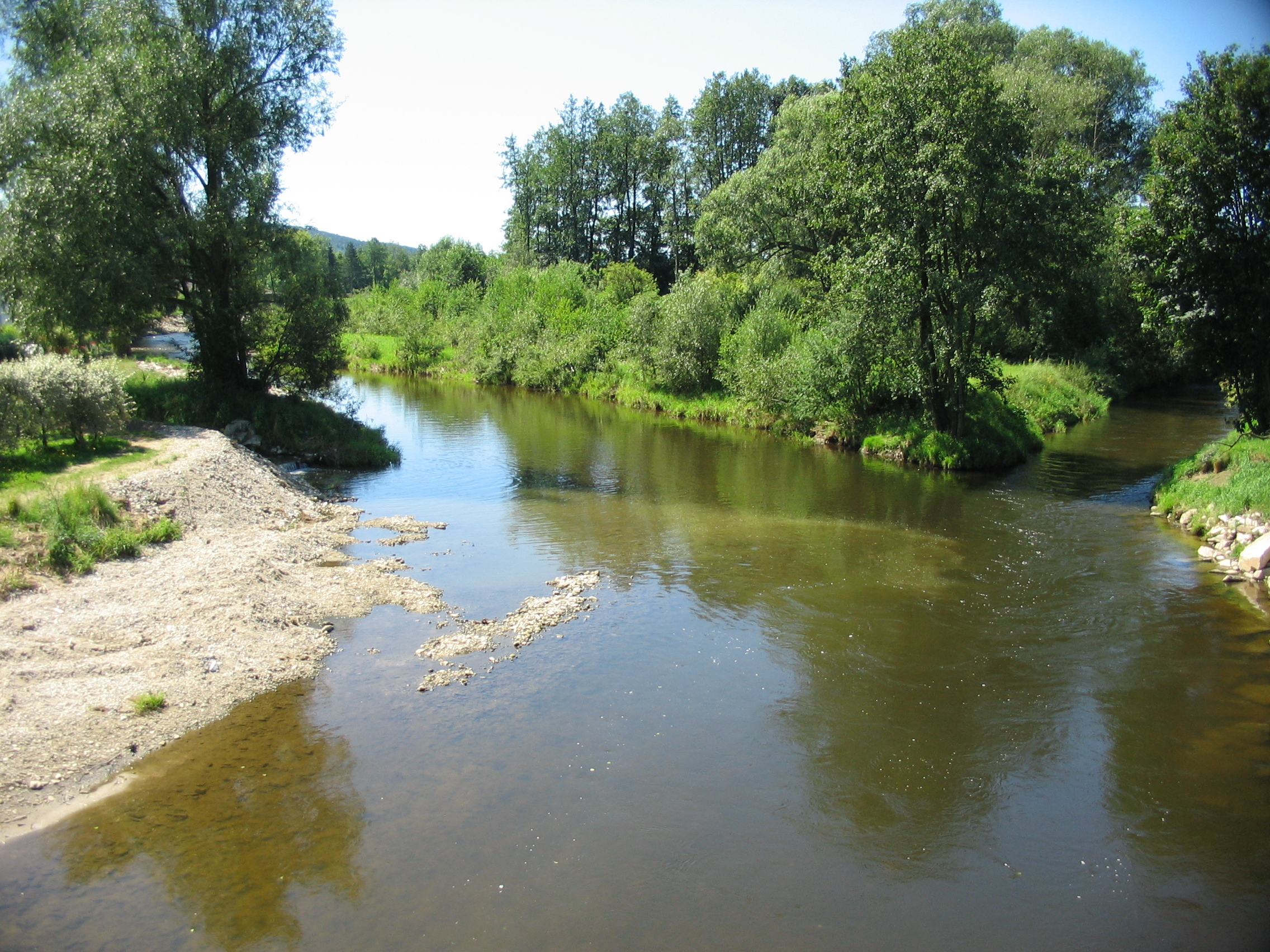
- The Volyňka in Mutěnice

Location
- Country: Czech Republic
- Region: South Bohemian

Physical characteristics
- Source
  - location: Borová Lada, Bohemian Forest
  - coordinates: 49°0′9″N 13°43′26″E
  - elevation: 1,042 m (3,419 ft)
- Mouth
  - location: Otava
  - coordinates: 49°15′31″N 13°54′16″E
  - elevation: 390 m (1,280 ft)
- Length: 46.1 km (28.6 mi)
- Basin size: 426.7 km^{2} (164.7 sq mi)
- Discharge
  - average: 3.09 m^{3}/s (109 cu ft/s) near estuary

Basin features
- Progression: Otava→ Vltava→ Elbe→ North Sea

The Volyňka is a river in the Czech Republic, a right tributary of the Otava River. It flows through the South Bohemian Region. It is 46.1 km (28.6 mi) long.

== Etymology ==
The river is named after the town of Volyně.

== Characteristic ==
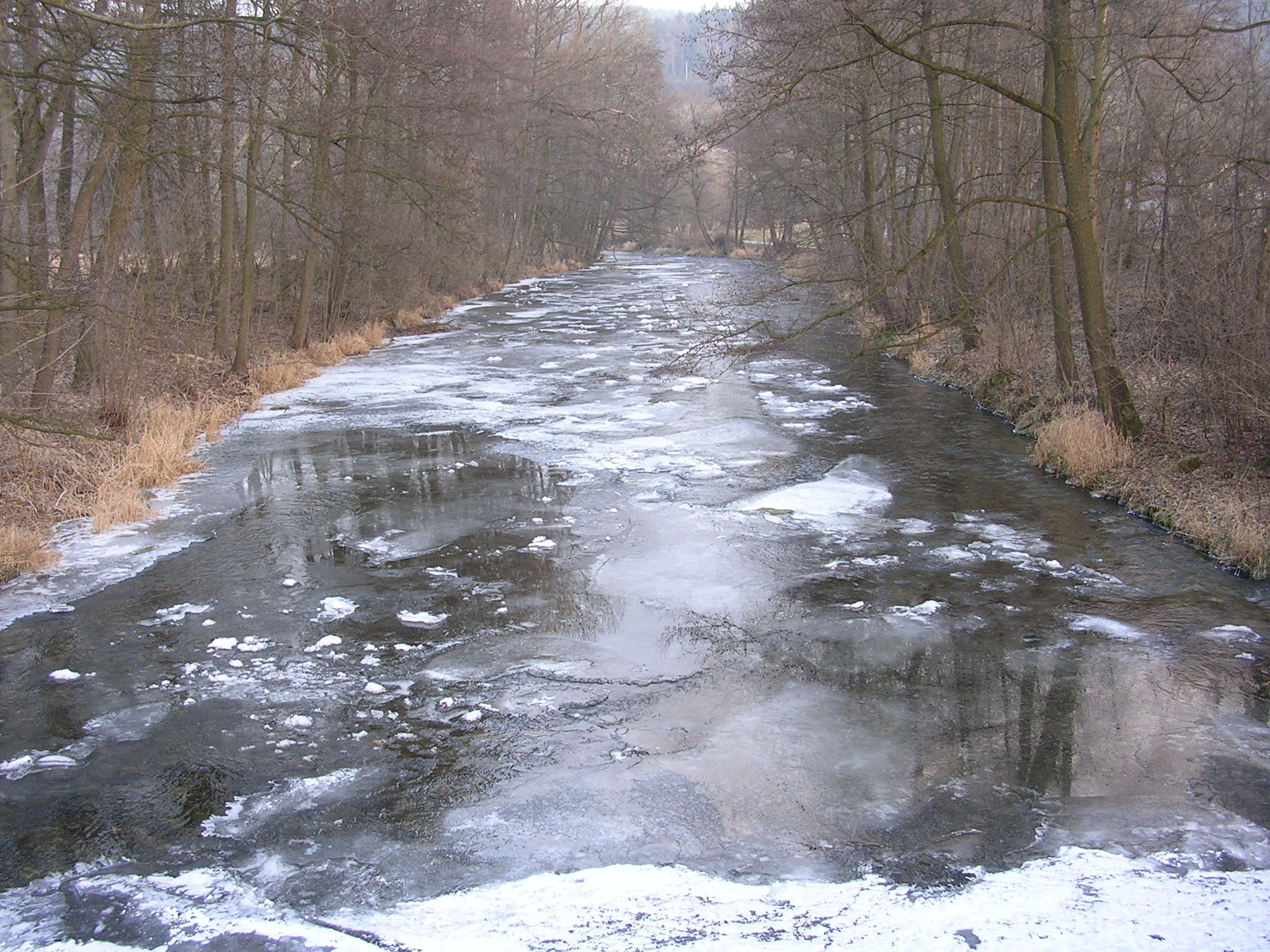
The Volyňka in Malenice

The Volyňka originates in the territory of Borová Lada in the Bohemian Forest at an elevation of 1,042 m (3,419 ft), on the slope of Mt. Světlá hora, and flows to Strakonice, where it enters the Otava River at an elevation of 390 m (1,280 ft). It is 46.1 km (28.6 mi) long. Its drainage basin has an area of 426.7 km^{2} (164.7 sq mi).

The longest tributaries of the Volyňka are:

Tributary	Length (km)	Side
Spůlka	20.5	left
Peklov	18.3	left
Smiradický potok	10.2	left

== Course ==
The largest settlements on the river are the towns of Strakonice and Vimperk. The river flows through the municipal territories of Borová Lada, Vimperk, Bohumilice, Čkyně, Lčovice, Malenice, Nišovice, Volyně, Přechovice, Němětice, Strunkovice nad Volyňkou, Přední Zborovice, Radošovice, Mutěnice and Strakonice.

== Bodies of water ==
There are 412 bodies of water in the basin area, but none of them is significant. The largest body of water in the basin area is the fishpond Blatský rybník with an area of 4.4 ha (11 acres). The Světlohorská Reservoir, a small reservoir on the upper course of the river, is the only body of water built directly on the river.

== Tourism ==
The Volyňka is suitable for river tourism. About 38 km (24 mi) of the river is navigable.

== See also ==
- List of rivers of the Czech Republic
