= Lčovice =

- Municipality
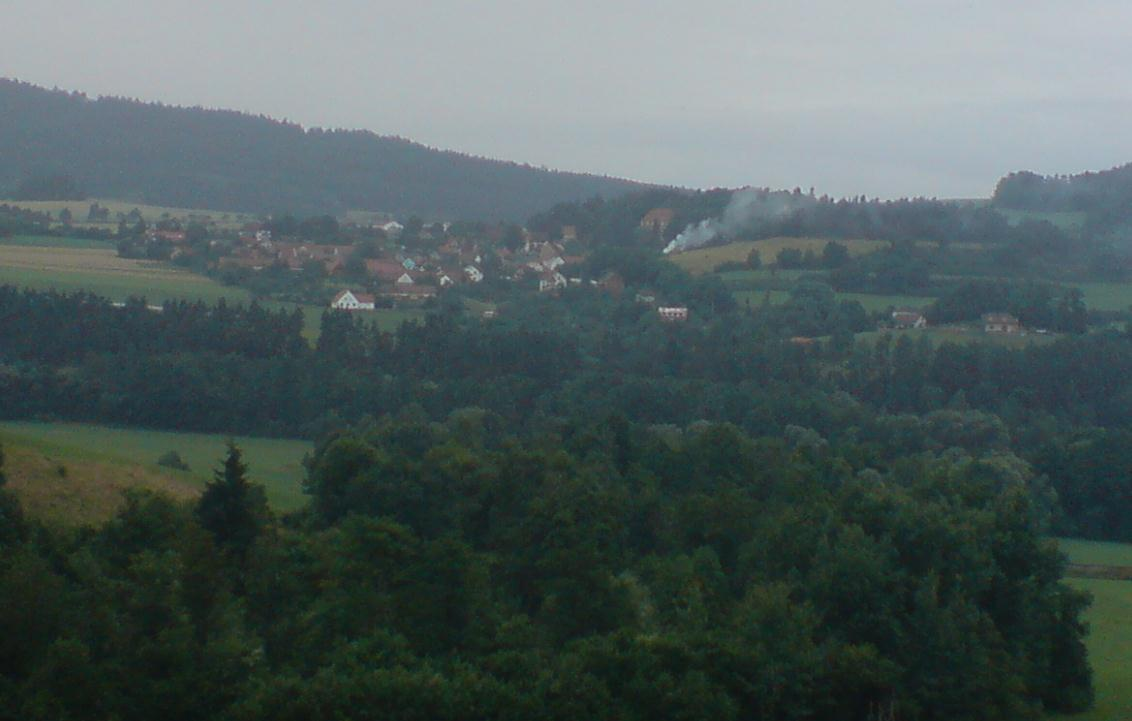
- General view

- Location in the Czech Republic
- Coordinates: 49°6′53″N 13°51′2″E
- Country: Czech Republic
- Region: South Bohemian
- District: Prachatice
- First mentioned: 1321

Area
  - Total: 5.77 km^{2} (2.23 sq mi)
- Elevation: 566 m (1,857 ft)

Population (2026-01-01)
  - Total: 142
  - Density: 24.6/km^{2} (63.7/sq mi)
- Time zone: UTC+1 (CET)
  - Summer (DST): UTC+2 (CEST)
- Postal code: 384 81
- Website: www.lcovice.cz

Lčovice is a municipality and village in Prachatice District in the South Bohemian Region of the Czech Republic. It has about 100 inhabitants.

== Etymology ==
The initial name of the village was probably Lščovice and was derived from the personal name Lščov, meaning "the village of Lščov's people". The village was also called Elčovice.

== Geography ==
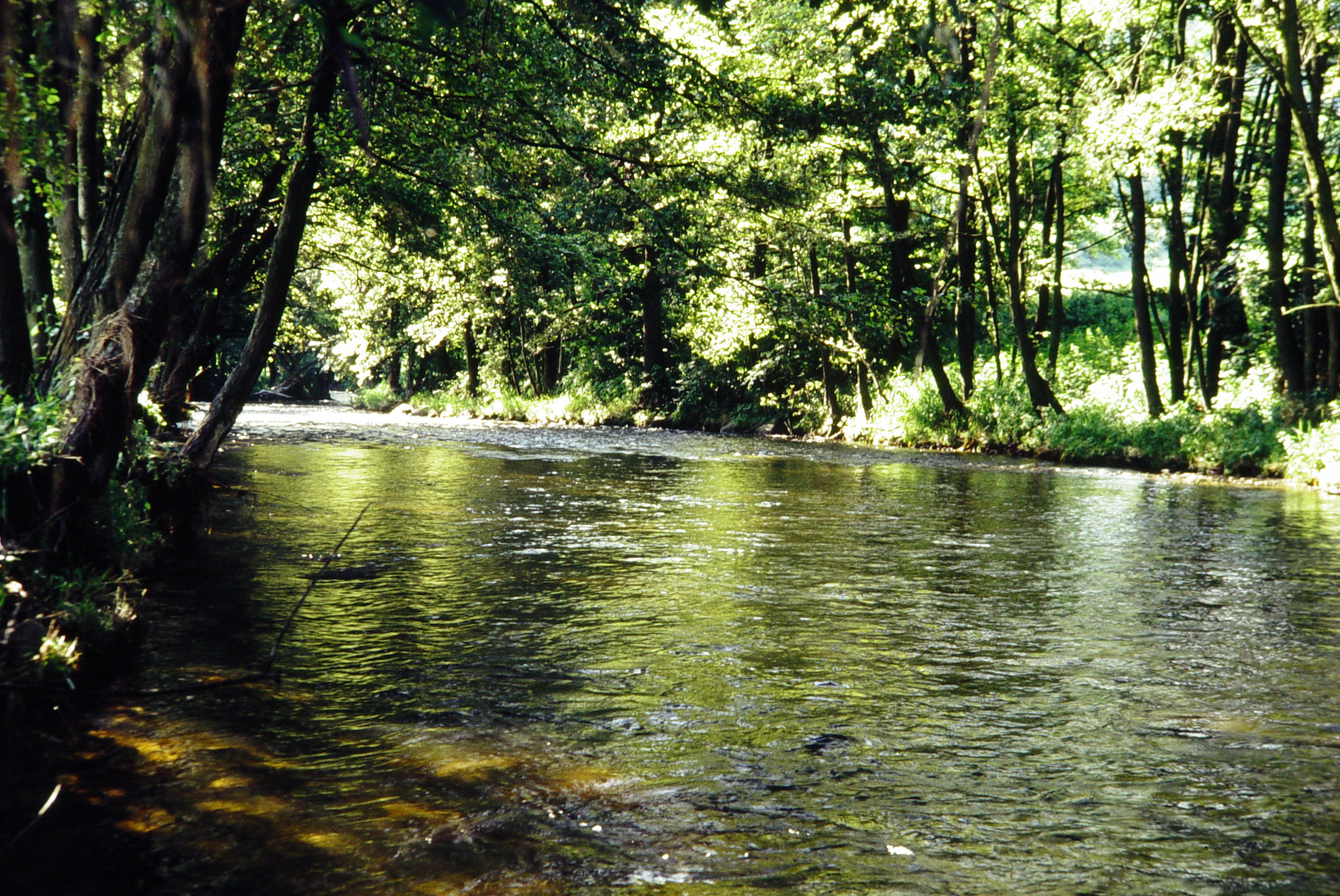
Volyňka river in Lčovice

Lčovice is located about 15 kilometres (9 mi) northwest of Prachatice and 47 km (29 mi) northwest of České Budějovice. It lies in the Bohemian Forest Foothills. The highest point is at 760 m (2,493 ft) above sea level. The Volyňka river flows through the municipality.

The built-up area of the village consists of two urbanistically separated parts. The upper part is spread over a hill, and the lower part is situated in the valley of the Volyňka.

== History ==
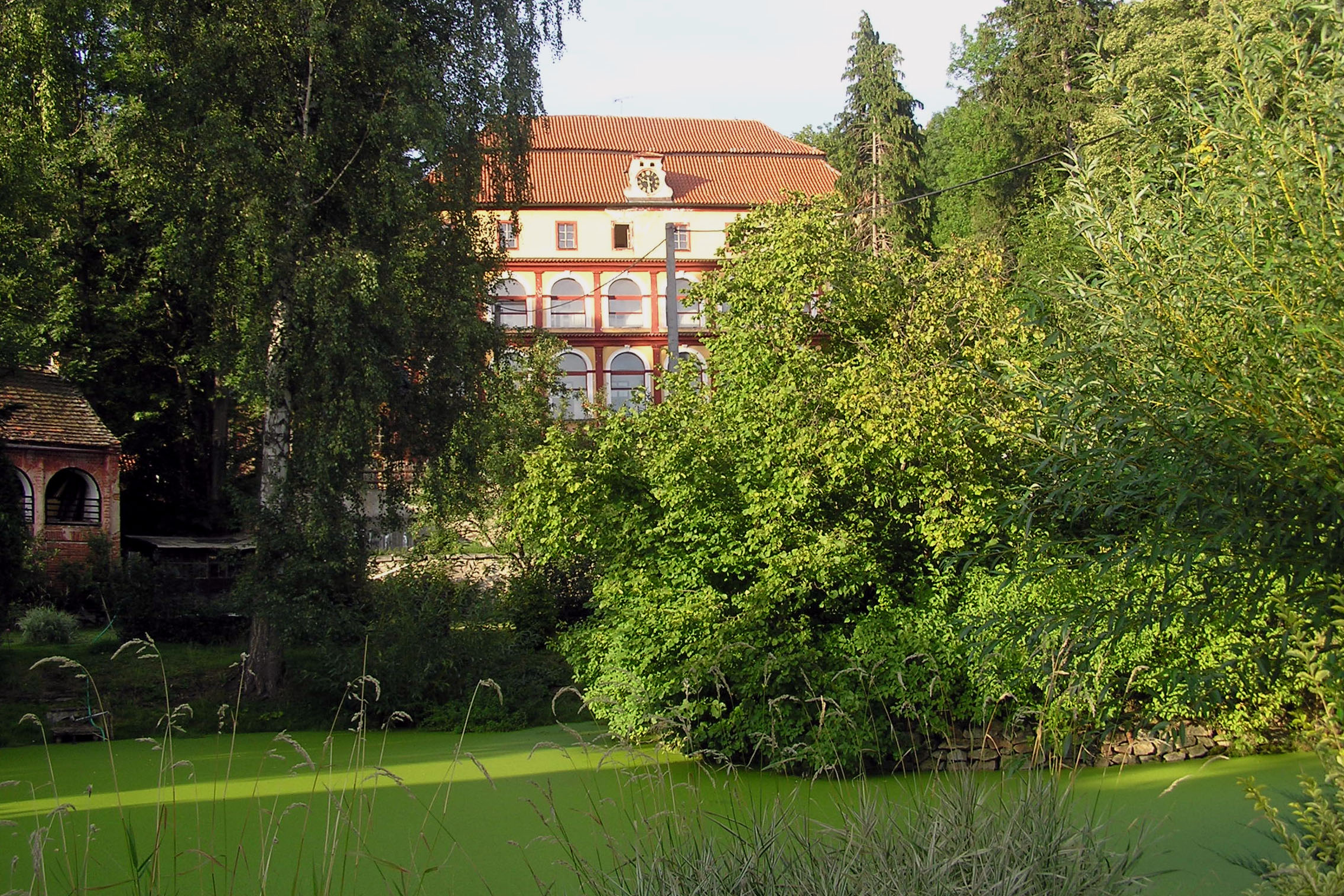
Lčovice Castle

The first written mention of Lčovice is from 1321, when it was owned by Zbraslav of Lčovice (in Latin Sbraslao de Ebizouiz). In 1360, the village was acquired by King Charles IV as escheat, and he donated it to Bušek of Velhartice. At the turn of the 14th and 15th centuries, the village with a fortress became a property of the Lords of Čestice.

In the early 17th century, Lčovice was acquired by Lord Bernart of Hodějov by marriage, but properties of the Hodějov family were confiscated after the Battle of White Mountain, and Lčovice was bought by Jindřich Michal Hýzrle. He had rebuilt the fortress into an early Baroque castle with Renaissance elements. He sold the estate in 1694. Lčovice changed hands frequently in the following decades, and the castle was modified several times.

After the reform in 1848, Lčovice became a municipal part of Malenice. From 1930 to 1960, it was a sovereign municipality. From 1961 to 1991, it was a municipal part of Čkyně. Since 1992, it has been again a separate municipality.

== Demographics ==
Historical population

Year	Pop.	±%
1869	407	—
1880	417	+2.5%
1890	388	−7.0%
1900	362	−6.7%
1910	360	−0.6%

Year	Pop.	±%
1921	386	+7.2%
1930	349	−9.6%
1950	236	−32.4%
1961	261	+10.6%
1970	252	−3.4%

Year	Pop.	±%
1980	187	−25.8%
1991	156	−16.6%
2001	132	−15.4%
2011	143	+8.3%
2021	133	−7.0%

Source: Censuses

== Transport ==
The railway line Strakonice–Volary runs through the municipality. Lčovice is served by the train station Lčovice, which, however, is located just outside the municipality.

== Sights ==
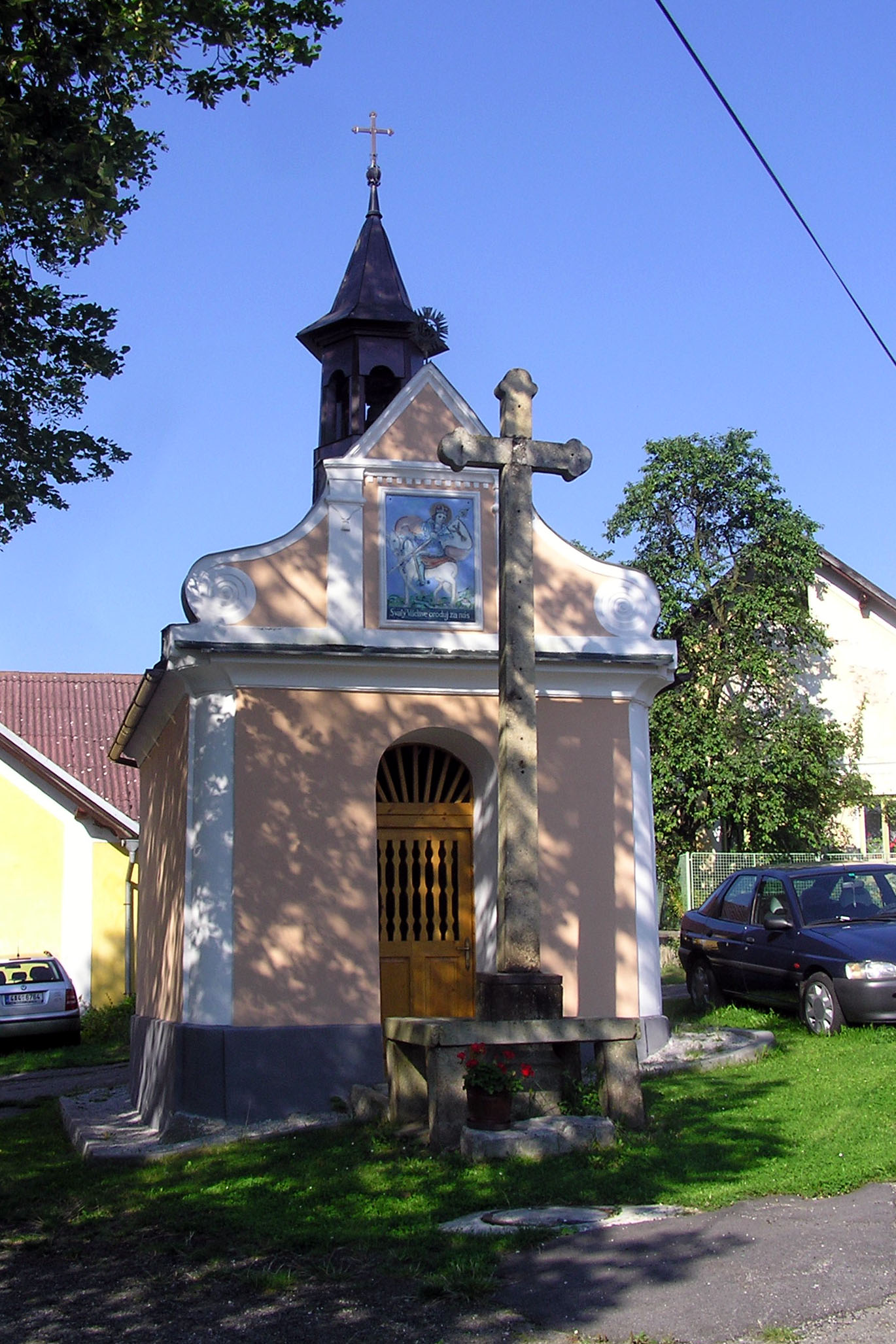
Chapel of Saint Wenceslaus

The most notable landmark is the Lčovice Castle. The castle complex protected as a cultural monument. The castle building has three floors and a mansard roof, and the main façade has high arcades that have groin vaults. Floor plan of the main building of the castle is mostly made up of the original Gothic fortress. In main entrance on the left side of the staircase is a preserved pointed Gothic portal. The gateway dates from the first half of the 19th century. Next to the main building is the so-called Small Castle in the early Baroque style with a mansard roof.

The castle park was founded in 1660. It contains an octagonal building of the Chapel of the Holy Trinity with a high dome with a lantern, decorated with ornamental and figural stucco and fresco painting. To the east of the roundel is the octagonal early Baroque tower, so-called Hunting Tower.

Since restitution after 1989, the castle has been owned by a private owner, is not accessible to the public and is gradually falling into disrepair.

The Chapel of Saint Wenceslaus in the centre of Lčovice was built in 1892 and originally was consecrated to the Virgin Mary. The Chapel of Saint John of Nepomuk was built in the mid-18th century. The fourth chapel in the municipality is the Chapel of Saint Anthony of Padua from 1714.

== Notable people ==
- Josef Zítek (1832–1909), architect; owned the castle and lived there
