= Mutěnice =

Mutěnice may refer to places in the Czech Republic:

- Mutěnice (Hodonín District), a municipality and village in the South Moravian Region
- Mutěnice (Strakonice District), a municipality and village in the South Bohemian Region
