= Strunkovice =

Strunkovice may refer to:

- Strunkovice nad Blanicí, a market town in Prachatice District, South Bohemian Region, Czech Republic
- Strunkovice nad Volyňkou, a village in Strakonice District, South Bohemian Region, Czech Republic
