= Josef Zítek =

Czech architect and engineer (1832–1909)

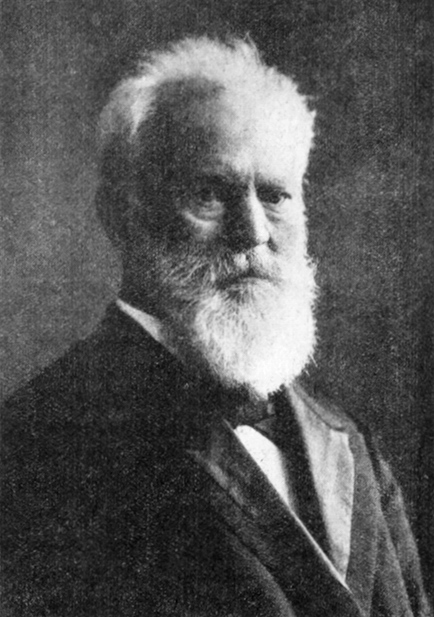
- Born: Josef Zítek; 4 April 1832; Karlín, Prague, Austrian Empire
- Died: 9 September 1909 (aged 77); Smíchov, Prague, Austria-Hungary
- Other name: Josef Zítek
- Education: Academy of Fine Arts Vienna
- Occupation: Architect
- Buildings: National Theatre; Rudolfinum

Josef von Zítek (4 April 1832 – 9 September 1909) was a Czech architect best known for two Neo-Renaissance landmarks in Prague, the National Theatre and the Rudolfinum.

== Life and work ==
Zítek's father died of cholera shortly before he was born, so his family was in dire financial need until 1839, when his mother found work as a laundry worker for the lawyer, Adolf Pinkas. Zítek began his professional studies in 1848 at the Prague Polytechnic (now the Czech Technical University). He graduated with honors in 1854 and joined the studios of Josef Kranner. After two years there, he began work at a studio jointly operated by Eduard van der Nüll and August Sicard von Sicardsburg, two of his former teachers at the Vienna Polytechnic. In 1858, he exhibited some of his designs at the academy and was awarded a prize that came with a scholarship, enabling him to spend two years in Rome. During his time in Italy, Zítek acquired a patron, Charles Alexander, Grand Duke of Saxe-Weimar-Eisenach. His first large commission, for the provincial gallery and museum in Weimar, was accomplished between 1863 and 1868. Projects for other aristocratic families followed.

The Grand Ducal Museum (in (in German) Großherzogliche Museum), now the Museum Neues Weimar, is one of the first purpose-built museum buildings in Germany designed according to Zítek's plans. The Neo-Renaissance building was constructed in 1869.

From 1864 to 1904, Zítek was a professor at the Polytechnic in Prague. His pupils there included Antonín Wiehl, who became a major exponent of Neo-Renaissance architecture, and Josef Schulz, with whom Zítek later collaborated. When a competition was announced to create a design for the new National Theatre, he was one of the first entrants, and his design was chosen. His other works from this period include a monument to the writer and politician Karel Havlíček Borovský, at Olšany Cemetery, and the Mill Colonnade in the spa city of Karlovy Vary. He also did restorative work.

A disastrous fire heavily damaged the National Theatre not long after its opening in 1881. Disputes, quarrels, and personal attacks, which had begun during construction, intensified afterwards. The theatre's choir rejected Zítek's restoration proposals, and he soon found himself being blamed for the fire. As a result, he resigned from his position as the project's architect, married his longtime fiancée, Berta Lippert, and took an extended honeymoon abroad. He swore he would never enter the Theatre when it reopened. The reconstruction was completed by his former student, Schulz. Zítek's last design that came to completion was the Rudolfinum, finished in 1884. It was done in cooperation with Schulz. Zítek continued to be a professional consultant and was a member of several art and architecture commissions.

Zítek lived in Prague but spent much of his time at his estate in Lčovice, where he devoted himself to cheese production. He and Berta had two sons, born in 1885 and 1888. One year before his death, Zítek obtained the title of Baron.

== Gallery ==
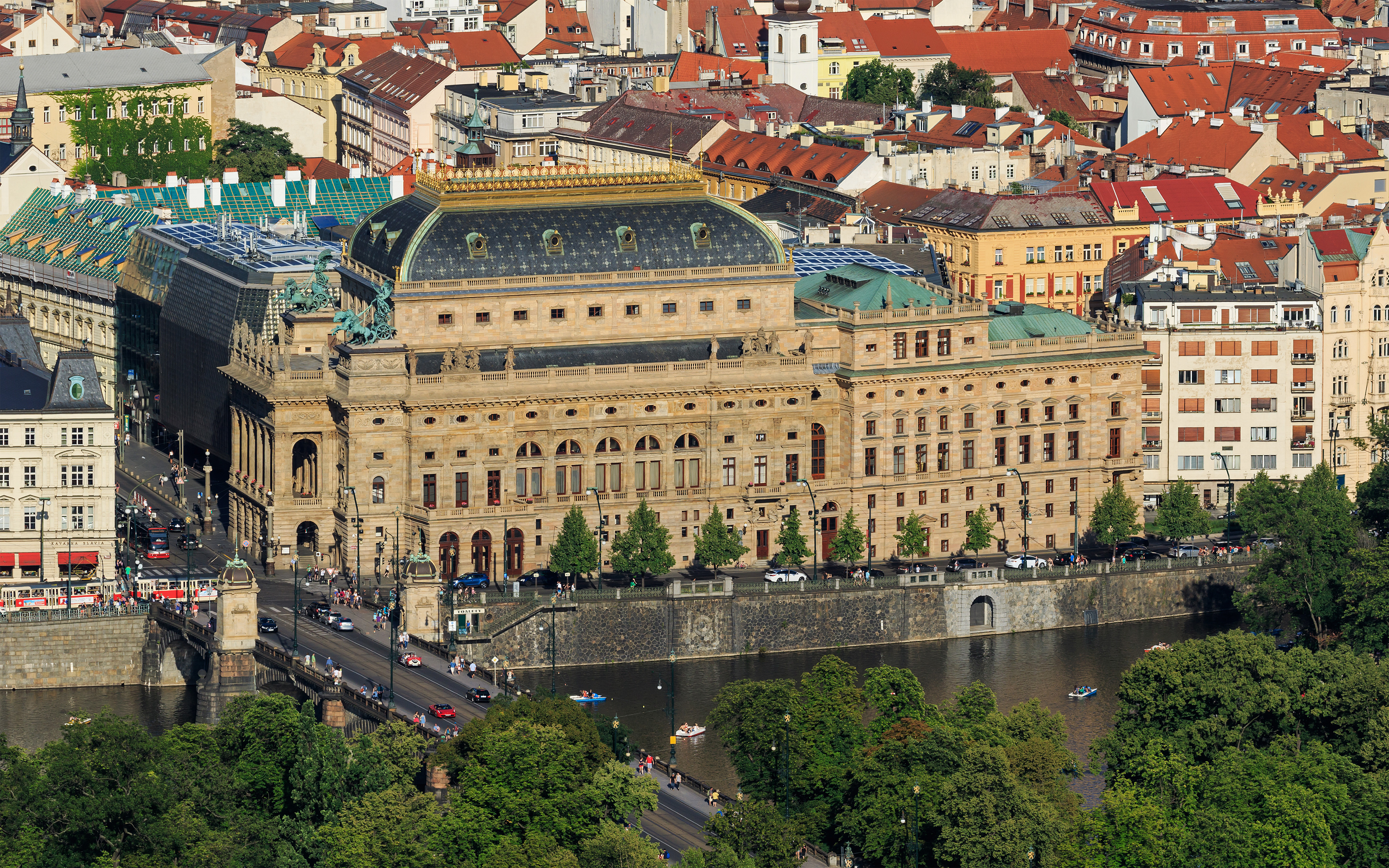
National Theatre, Prague

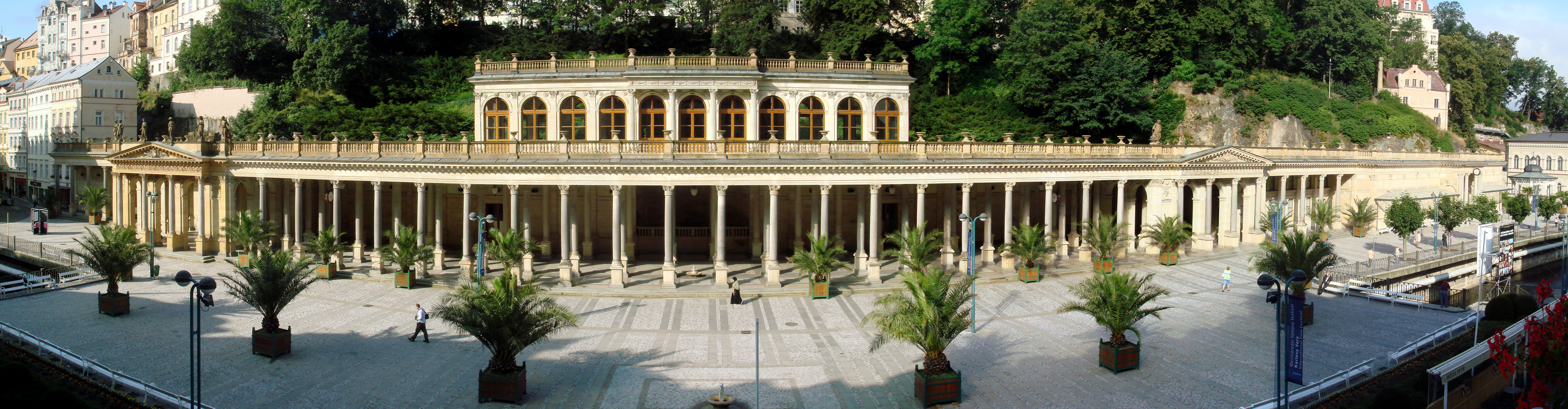
Mill Colonnade, Karlovy Vary

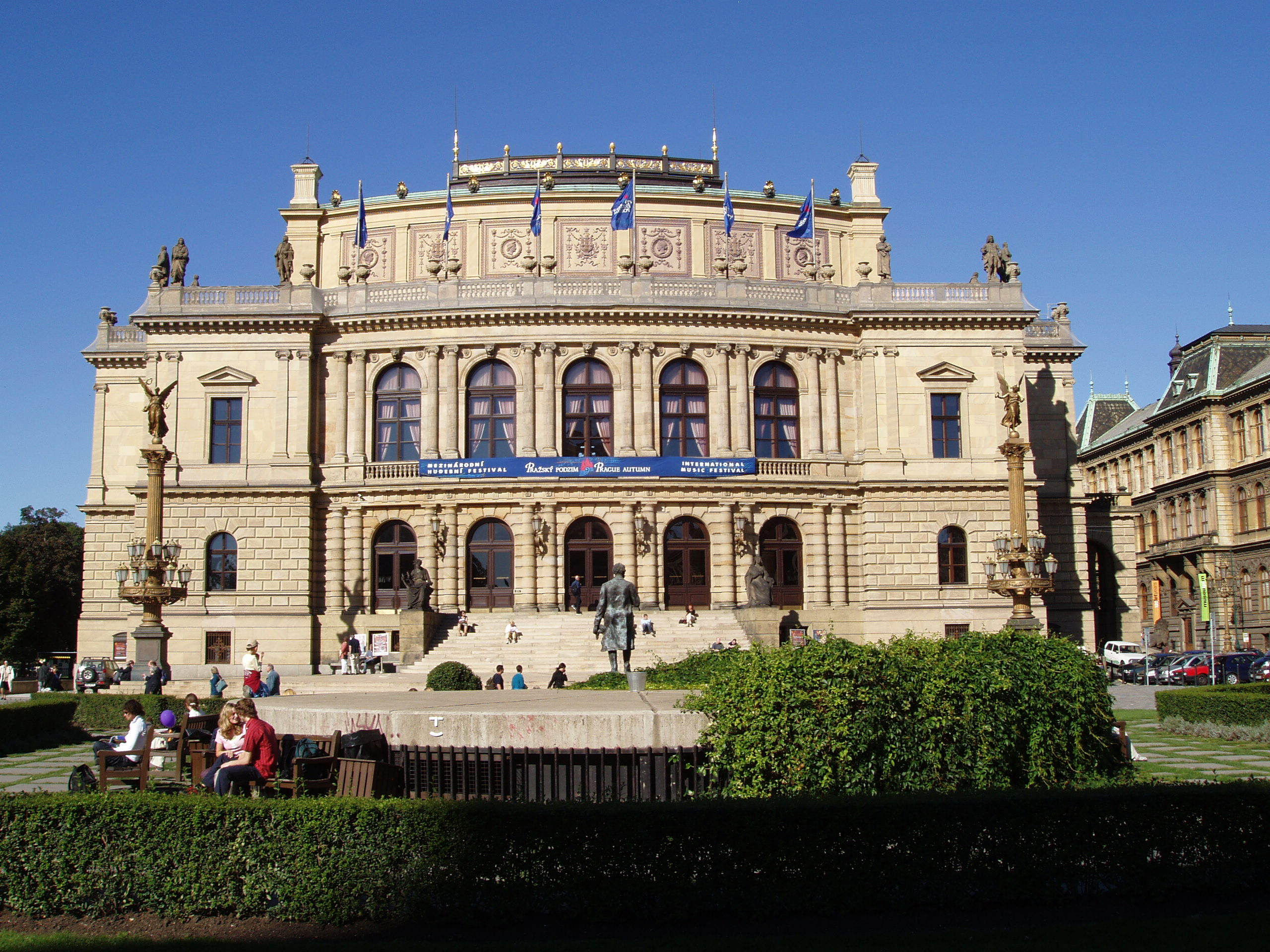
Rudolfinum, Prague
