= Čkyně =

- Municipality
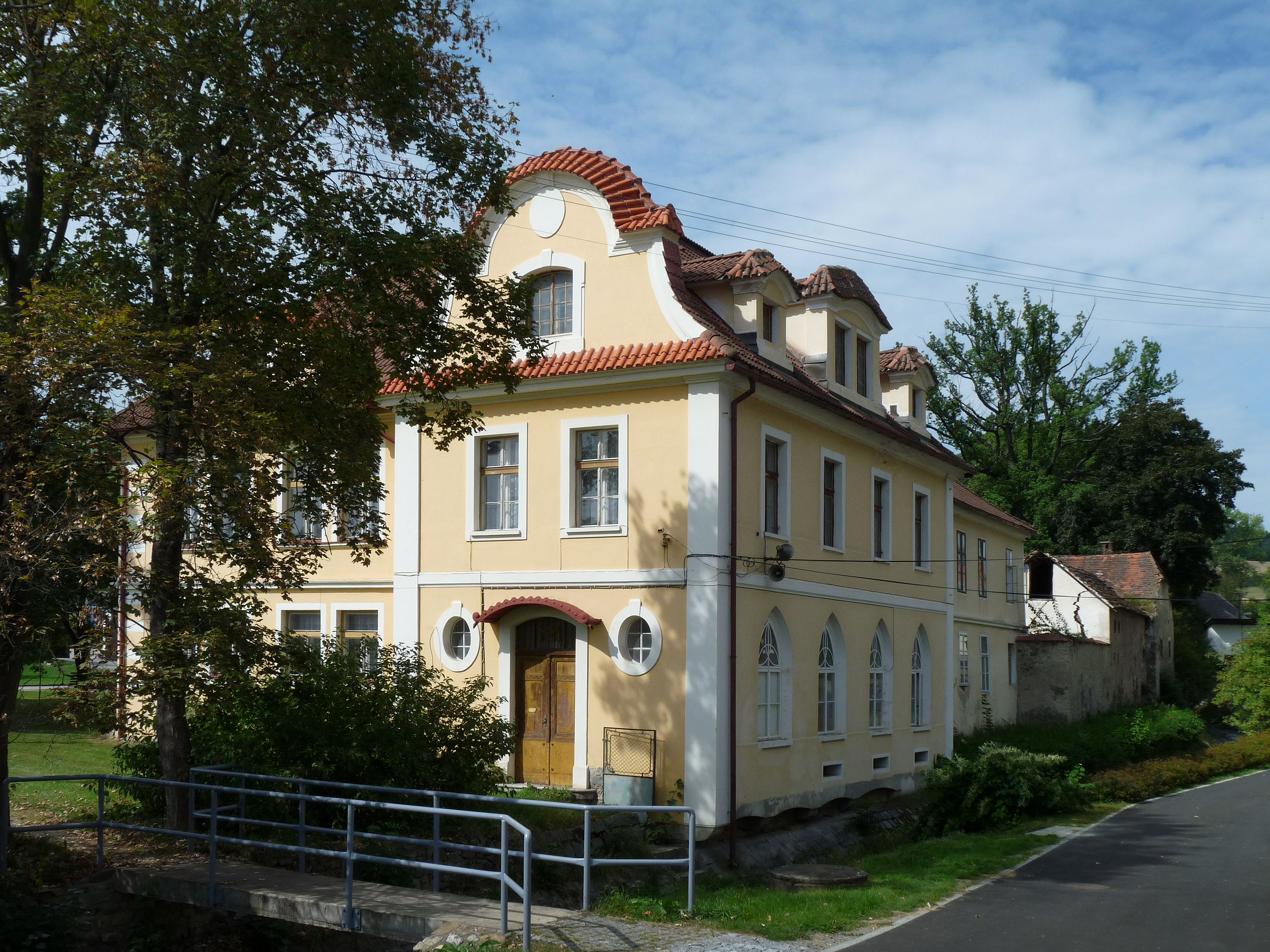
- Čkyně Castle, now the municipal office

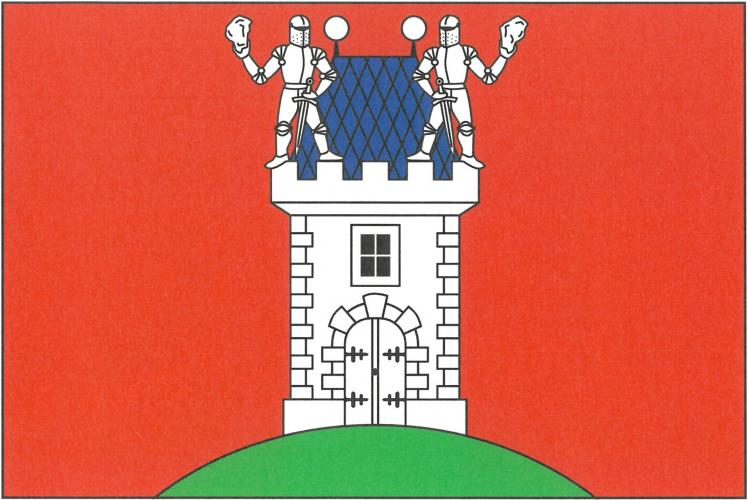
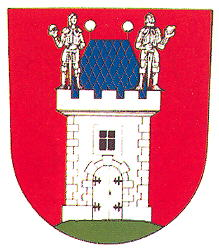
- Flag Coat of arms

- Location in the Czech Republic
- Coordinates: 49°6′54″N 13°49′45″E
- Country: Czech Republic
- Region: South Bohemian
- District: Prachatice
- First mentioned: 1243

Area
  - Total: 20.68 km^{2} (7.98 sq mi)
- Elevation: 523 m (1,716 ft)

Population (2026-01-01)
  - Total: 1,553
  - Density: 75.10/km^{2} (194.5/sq mi)
- Time zone: UTC+1 (CET)
  - Summer (DST): UTC+2 (CEST)
- Postal code: 384 81
- Website: www.ckyne.cz

Čkyně is a municipality and village in Prachatice District in the South Bohemian Region of the Czech Republic. It has about 1,600 inhabitants.

== Administrative division ==
Čkyně consists of seven municipal parts (in brackets population according to the 2021 census):

- Čkyně (1,225)
- Dolany (84)
- Horosedly (40)
- Onšovice (86)
- Předenice (34)
- Spůle (63)
- Záhoříčko (41)

== Etymology ==
The initial name of Čkyně was probably Čekyně. That would mean that name was derived from the surname Ček, meaning "Ček's (fortress)".

== Geography ==
Čkyně is located about 17 kilometres (11 mi) west of Prachatice and 48 km (30 mi) west of České Budějovice. It lies in the Bohemian Forest Foothills. The highest point is the hill Vacovický vrch at 823 m (2,700 ft) above sea level. The Volyňka River flows through the municipality.

== History ==
The first written mention of Čkyně is in a deed of King Wenceslaus I from 1243. In 1537, Čkyně was promoted to a market town by Emperor Ferdinand I, but it later lost the title.

== Demographics ==
Historical population

Year	Pop.	±%
1869	2,154	—
1880	2,040	−5.3%
1890	2,029	−0.5%
1900	2,080	+2.5%
1910	2,244	+7.9%

Year	Pop.	±%
1921	2,017	−10.1%
1930	1,840	−8.8%
1950	1,473	−19.9%
1961	1,549	+5.2%
1970	1,481	−4.4%

Year	Pop.	±%
1980	1,480	−0.1%
1991	1,486	+0.4%
2001	1,436	−3.4%
2011	1,548	+7.8%
2021	1,573	+1.6%

Source: Censuses

== Transport ==
The I/23 road (the section from Strakonice to Vimperk and the Czech–German border) runs through the municipality.

Čkyně is located on the railway line Strakonice–Volary.

== Sights ==
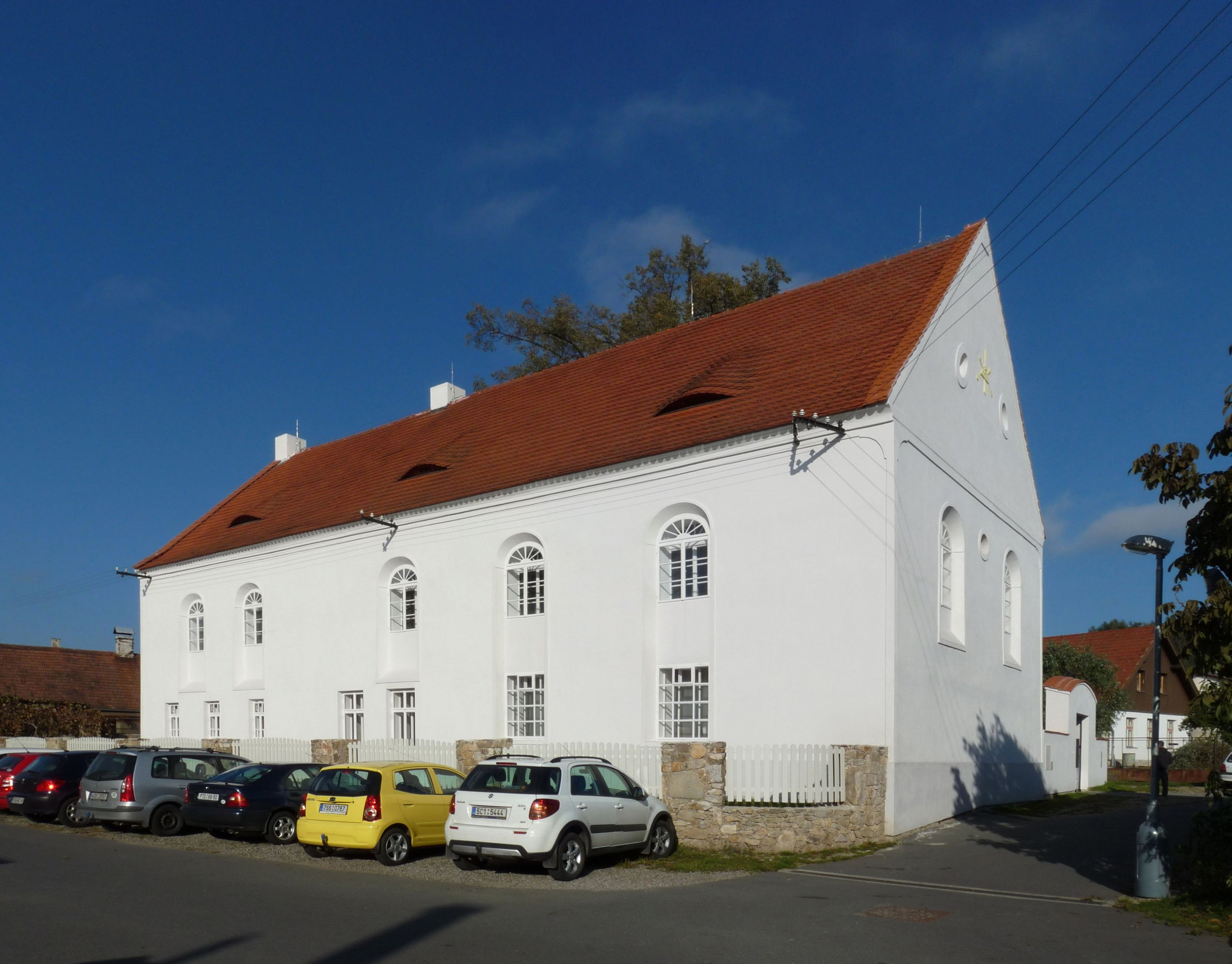
Former synagogue

The Church of Saint Mary Magdalene was originally built in the early Gothic style in the second half of the 13th century. It was rebuilt in 1789. The nave was extended in the second half of the 19th century.

A significant landmark is the former synagogue. It was built in the Neoclassical style in 1828. After 1922, it was rebuilt and ceased to have religious use. Today it houses a museum.

The Čkyně Castle was built in the second half of the 16th century as a Renaissance fortress. After 1816, it was rebuilt into a neo-Gothic castle. Today the building houses the municipal office.
