= Přední Zborovice =

- Municipality
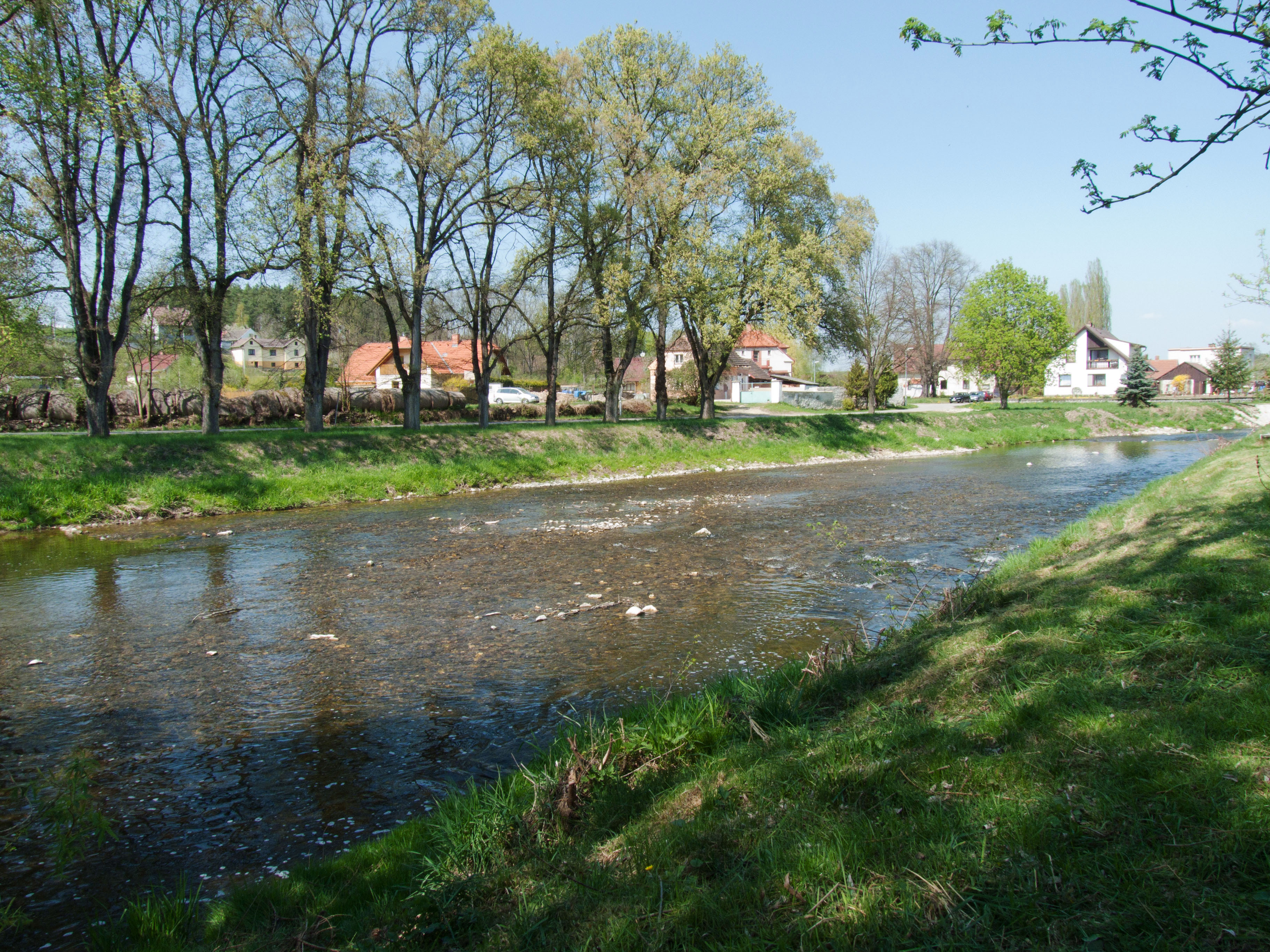
- The Volyňka River in Přední Zborovice

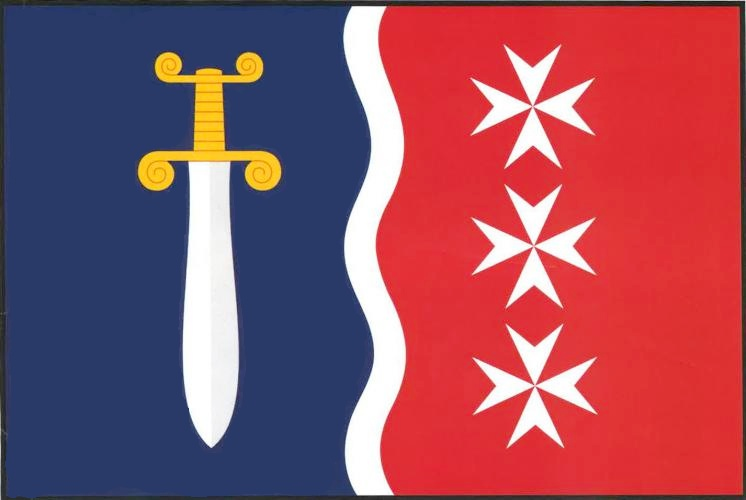
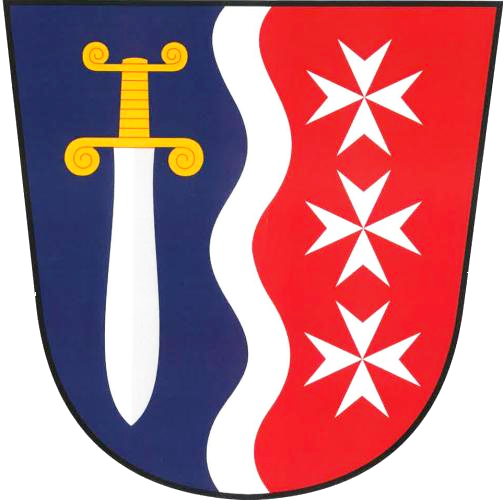
- Flag Coat of arms

- Location in the Czech Republic
- Coordinates: 49°13′7″N 13°53′32″E
- Country: Czech Republic
- Region: South Bohemian
- District: Strakonice
- First mentioned: 1318

Area
  - Total: 2.93 km^{2} (1.13 sq mi)
- Elevation: 413 m (1,355 ft)

Population (2026-01-01)
  - Total: 88
  - Density: 30/km^{2} (78/sq mi)
- Time zone: UTC+1 (CET)
  - Summer (DST): UTC+2 (CEST)
- Postal code: 387 01
- Website: www.prednizborovice.cz

Přední Zborovice is a municipality and village in Strakonice District in the South Bohemian Region of the Czech Republic. It has about 90 inhabitants.

Přední Zborovice lies approximately 5 kilometres (3 mi) south of Strakonice, 51 km (32 mi) north-west of České Budějovice, and 104 km (65 mi) south of Prague.

== Demographics ==
Historical population
Year	Pop.	±%
1869	161	—
1880	165	+2.5%
1890	152	−7.9%
1900	161	+5.9%
1910	155	−3.7%
1921	162	+4.5%
1930	169	+4.3%
1950	156	−7.7%
1961	168	+7.7%
1970	133	−20.8%
1980	115	−13.5%
1991	88	−23.5%
2001	65	−26.1%
2011	92	+41.5%
2021	94	+2.2%
Source: Censuses
