= Museum Neues Weimar =

Museum in Weimar, Germany

Neues Museum Weimar

The Museum Neues Weimar (known as the Thüringisches Landesmuseum from 1919 to 1946) and as the Neues Museum Weimar (after 1999) is a museum in Weimar, Germany, operated by the Klassik Stiftung Weimar, which focuses on art and design from 1900 and includes its own workshop for craft-based work. Originally built as the Grand Ducal Museum (German: Großherzogliches Museum) in Weimar, it is one of the first purpose-built museum buildings in Germany. The neo-renaissance building was constructed in 1869 according to the plans of the Prague architect Josef Zitek.

In the 1920s, trailblazing exhibitions of modern art were presented here. The permanent exhibition opened in 2019, recounts the history of modernism before the Bauhaus.

== Permanent exhibition ==
The permanent exhibition Van de Velde, Nietzsche und die Moderne um 1900 (Van de Velde, Nietzsche and Modernism around 1900) opened in April 2019. It presents international works of early modernism from the Weimar School of painting to Henry van de Velde.

The exhibition is dedicated to the mentors and trailblazers of modernism. Beginning with the cult surrounding Friedrich Nietzsche and leading into the European avant-garde supported by Count Harry Kessler and Henry van de Velde's innovative School of Arts and Crafts – the exhibition sketches an exciting picture of early modernism in Weimar. Internationally significant works of Realism, Impressionism and Art Nouveau can be seen.

== Reform of the Weimar Art School ==
The Weimar Art School became a state-financed institution in 1902. As its new director, the artist Hans Olde fundamentally reformed its curriculum to focus on handcraft-technical education in all areas of free and applied arts. The school was gradually expanded and gained a graphics department and printing workshop.

In 1902, for the first time ever in Germany, women were allowed to study art. Magda Langenstrass-Uhlig was one of the first female art students at the Weimar Art School. Women were taught in separate classes, but lectures were open to everyone.

A younger generation of instructors joined the faculty. With the appointment of Ludwig von Hoffmann, the Art School gained one of the most renowned colorists and decorative pointers in the German empire.

== Harry Graf Kessler as a Museum Director ==
In 1902 Harry Graf Kessler and Henry Van De Velde began developing ideas for new exhibitions of contemporary German and European avant-garde art at the Museum of Art and the Arts and Crafts. In three spectacular exhibitions, he popularised Neo-Impressionism in Germany. In 1903 Kessler initiated the Association of German Artists and cultivated contacts with international artists, gallery owners and collectors. He procured masterpieces by Monet and Rodin for the Weimar museum, as well as an early work of a still unknown Max Beckmann. But Kessler stirred up controversy; in 1906 a scandal followed an exhibition of presumably obscene aquarelles by Auguste Rodin. The Grand Duke Wilhelm Ernst refused to support Kessler, who handed in his resignation shortly thereafter. Rodin's aquarelles are part of the museum's permanent exhibition.

== Weimar Art School and Bauhaus in 1919 - 1933 ==
During the period from 1919 to 1933, Germany was characterised by a divided political landscape. Left and right, conservatives and modernists, militarists and liberals fought against each other. The directors of the school reacted to the political situation.

Walter Gropius, director of the Bauhaus from 1919 to 1928, wanted to keep the school out of day-to-day political disputes, which he only partially succeeded in doing. He imposed a ban on politics at the Bauhaus as early as November 1919. Due to disputes with the conservative-bourgeois government in Thuringia, the Bauhaus in Weimar was closed by the teaching staff on April 1, 1925.

Hannes Meyer, Gropius' successor and a convinced socialist, fuelled the discussions about the school. From 1928, he reorganised the Bauhaus according to the goal: "People's needs instead of luxury needs". Hannes Meyer was dismissed by the city of Dessau in 1930 for political reasons.

Ludwig Mies van der Rohe became Meyer's successor. He also banned all political activities at the Bauhaus. On September 30, 1932 the Bauhaus in Dessau was dissolved after the NSDAP won the majority in the municipal elections. Ludwig Mies van der Rohe continued to run the school in Berlin from October 1932 until it was dissolved by the teching staff on July 20, 1933. Before that, the school building had been searched and sealed by the SA and the police. Political demands had been made in favour of a reopening, which were unacceptable to van der Rohe.

A large number of students and teachers emigrated after the dissolution of the Bauhaus. They made a decisive contribution to the worldwide dissemination of Bauhaus ideas. Others went into internal emigration, while still others came to terms with the political conditions in Germany or actively supported them.
