= Borová Lada =

- Municipality
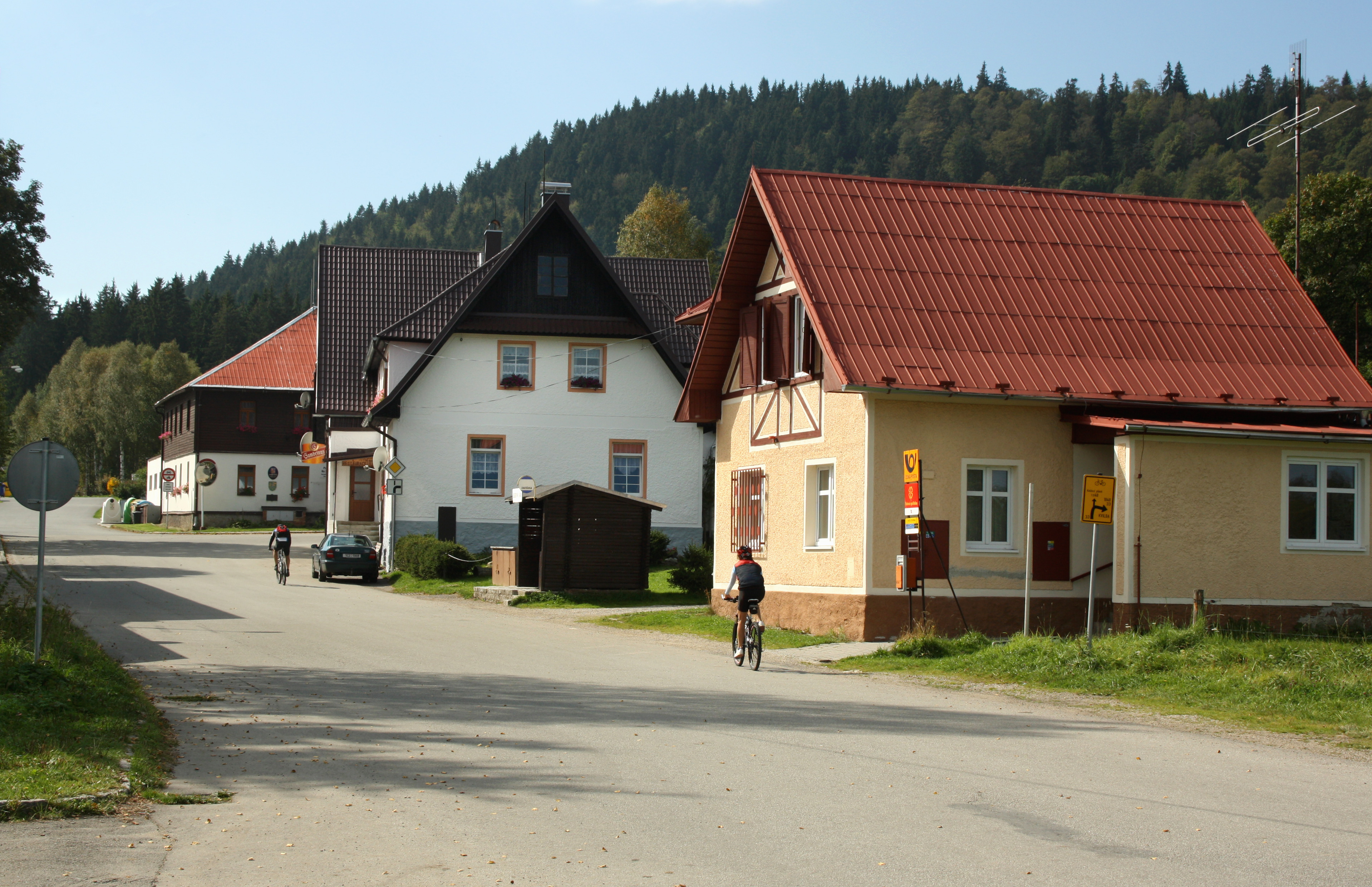
- Centre of Borová Lada

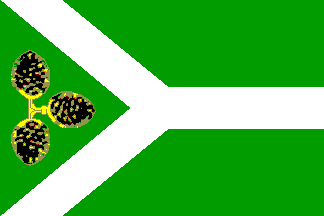
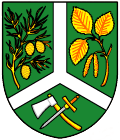
- Flag Coat of arms

- Location in the Czech Republic
- Coordinates: 48°59′24″N 13°39′36″E
- Country: Czech Republic
- Region: South Bohemian
- District: Prachatice
- Founded: 1750

Area
  - Total: 68.94 km^{2} (26.62 sq mi)
- Elevation: 895 m (2,936 ft)

Population (2026-01-01)
  - Total: 279
  - Density: 4.05/km^{2} (10.5/sq mi)
- Time zone: UTC+1 (CET)
  - Summer (DST): UTC+2 (CEST)
- Postal codes: 384 92, 385 01
- Website: www.borova-lada.cz

Borová Lada (German: Ferchenhaid) is a municipality and village in Prachatice District in the South Bohemian Region of the Czech Republic. It has about 300 inhabitants.

== Administrative division ==
Borová Lada consists of eight municipal parts (in brackets population according to the 2021 census):

- Borová Lada (225)
- Černá Lada (0)
- Knížecí Pláně (0)
- Nový Svět (26)
- Paseka (0)
- Šindlov (0)
- Svinná Lada (6)
- Zahrádky (3)

== Etymology ==
The initial German name Ferchenhaid was derived from the words Föhre ('pine') and Heide ('wasteland'). The Czech name is a translation of the German name.

== Geography ==
Borová Lada is located about 25 kilometres (16 mi) west of Prachatice and 60 km (37 mi) west of České Budějovice, on the border with Germany. It lies in the Bohemian Forest and mostly in the Šumava National Park. The highest point is the mountain Světlá hora at 1,123 m (3,684 ft) above sea level. The Teplá Vltava River flows through the municipality. The Volyňka River originates in the woods on the slope of the Světlá hora. The territory of Borová Lada is densely forested. There are moors in the northern part of the municipality.

== History ==
Borová Lada was founded around 1750 on the initiative of the owner of this territory, Prince Adam Franz of Schwarzenberg. In 1855, the village had 230 inhabitants and most of them were ethnic Germans. After World War II, the German-speaking population was expelled.

== Demographics ==
Historical population

Year	Pop.	±%
1869	2,066	—
1880	2,233	+8.1%
1890	2,265	+1.4%
1900	2,202	−2.8%
1910	2,133	−3.1%

Year	Pop.	±%
1921	2,138	+0.2%
1930	2,049	−4.2%
1950	317	−84.5%
1961	277	−12.6%
1970	264	−4.7%

Year	Pop.	±%
1980	243	−8.0%
1991	278	+14.4%
2001	284	+2.2%
2011	276	−2.8%
2021	260	−5.8%

Source: Censuses

== Transport ==
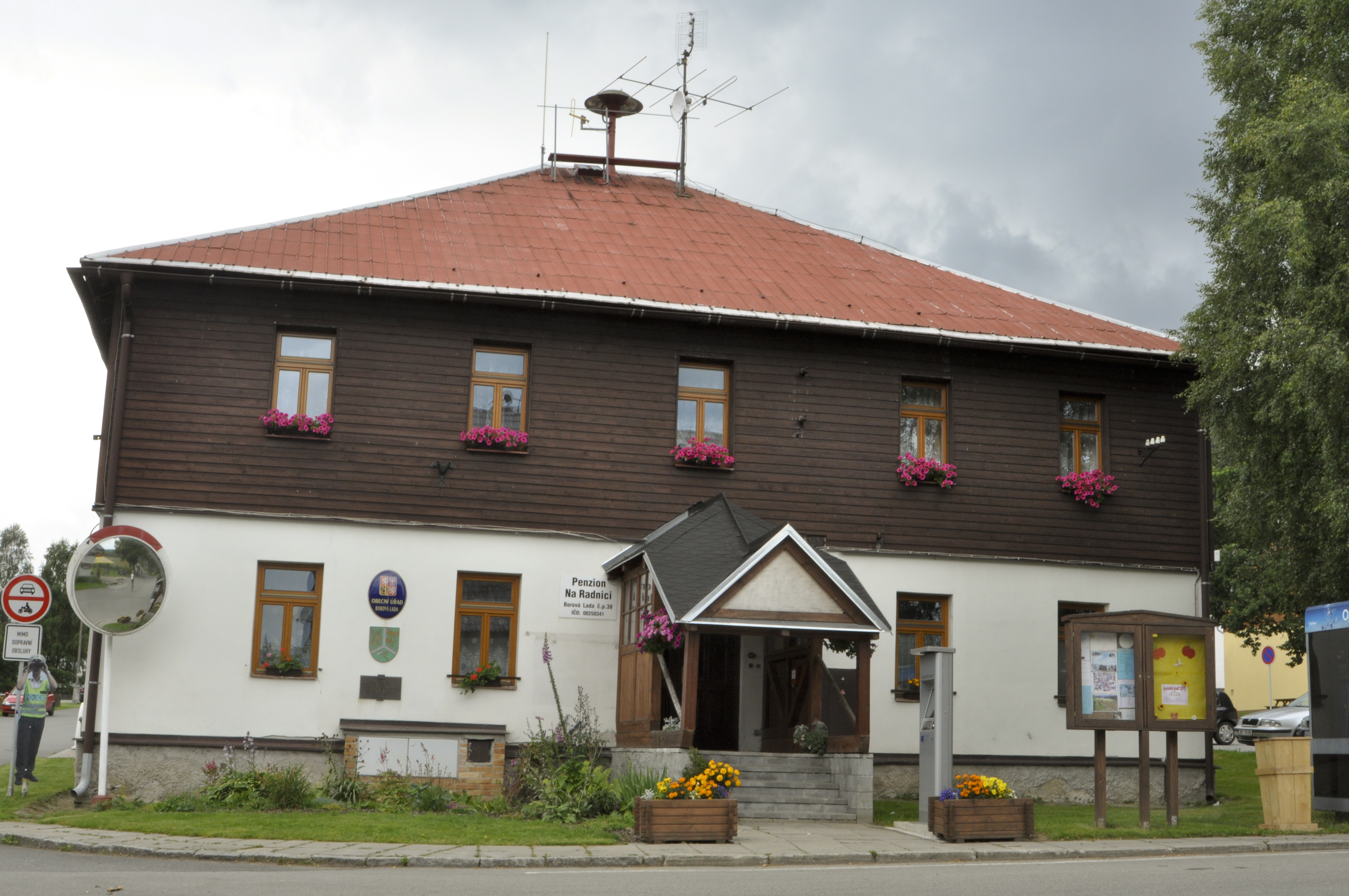
Municipal office

There are no railways or major roads passing through the municipality.

== Sights ==
The only protected cultural monument in the municipality is the house No. 11, which is a rural house from the first half of the 19th century.
