= Magda Langenstrass-Uhlig =

German painter (1888–1965)

Magda Langenstrass-Uhlig, 1922 © Potsdam Museum - Forum für Kunst und Geschichte, Potsdam

Magda Langenstrass-Uhlig, née Uhlig (born 11 November 1888 in Zillbach, Großherzogtum Sachsen-Weimar-Eisenach - died 2 October 1965 in Wehrda, Marburg district) was a German modernist painter. She created an extensive body of expressionist work, partly inspired by the Bauhaus.

== Life and Work ==
From 1895 to 1903, Magda Uhlig attended a secondary school for girls in Bad Berka, near Weimar, and spent a year at a boarding school for girls in Erfurt. During these years, her interest in and talent for paining were discovered and she began receiving drawing lessons. After her parents moved to the residential city of Weimar in 1904, she was admitted to the Princely Free Drawing School in Weimar – an unusual achievemnt for a woman in the arts at that time - while also taking elective courses at the Grand Ducal Saxon Art School in Weimar between 1905 and 1906. From 1907 to 1911, she pursued further studies at the Weimar Art School, ultimately graduating with a diploma in painting.
