= Malenice =

- Municipality
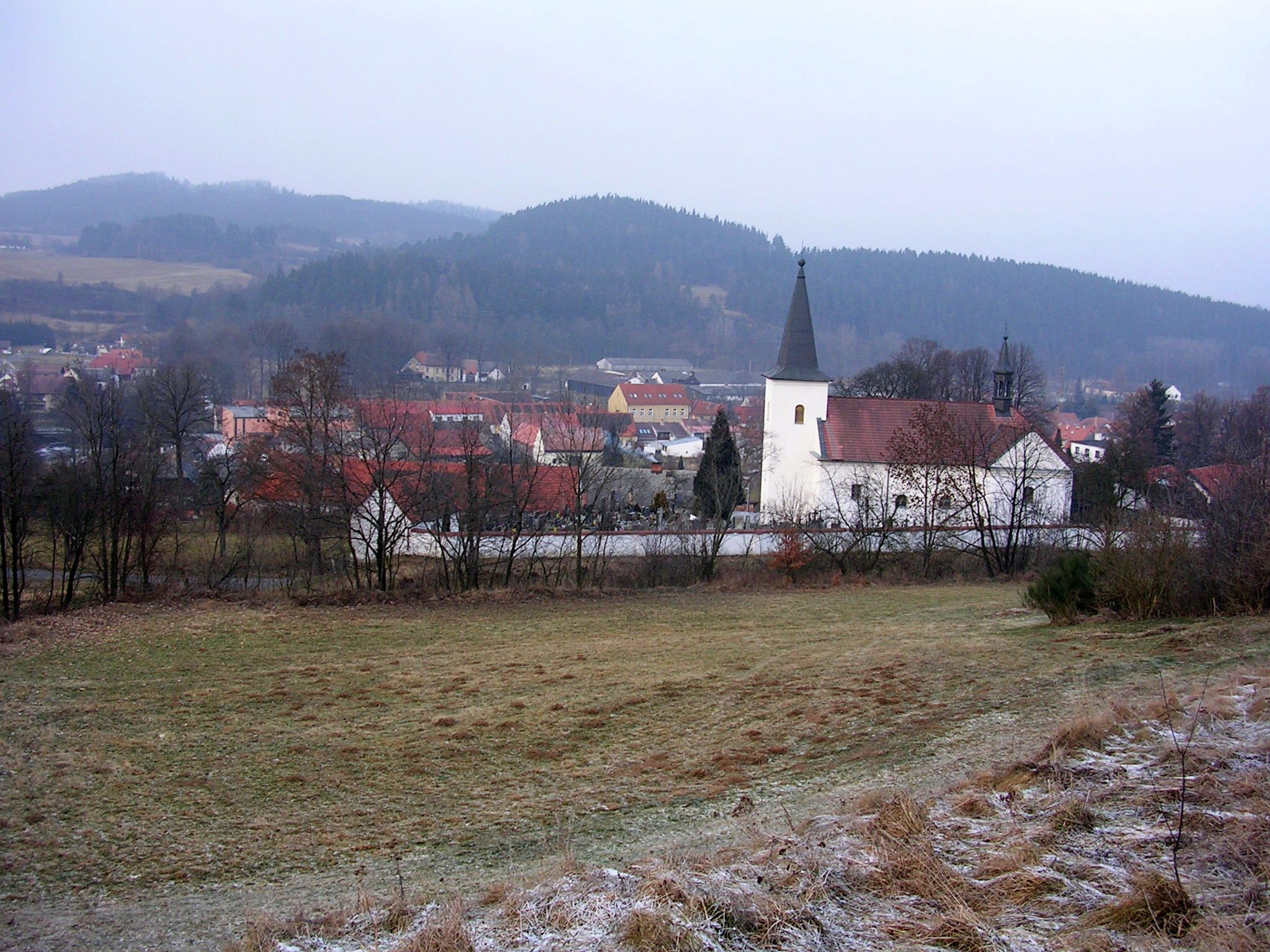
- Church of Saint James the Great

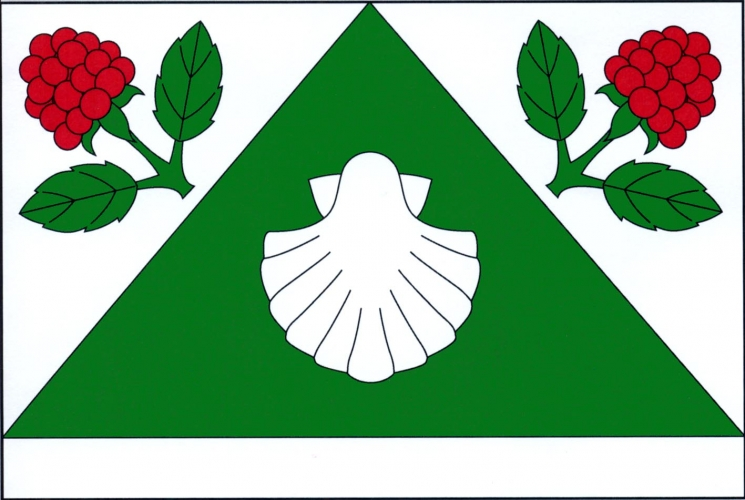
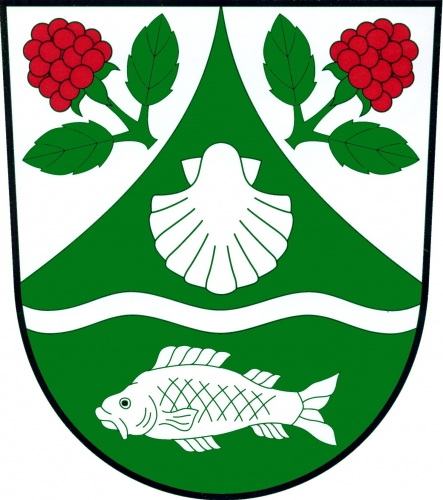
- Flag Coat of arms

- Location in the Czech Republic
- Coordinates: 49°7′35″N 13°52′58″E
- Country: Czech Republic
- Region: South Bohemian
- District: Strakonice
- First mentioned: 1320

Area
  - Total: 9.87 km^{2} (3.81 sq mi)
- Elevation: 483 m (1,585 ft)

Population (2026-01-01)
  - Total: 737
  - Density: 74.7/km^{2} (193/sq mi)
- Time zone: UTC+1 (CET)
  - Summer (DST): UTC+2 (CEST)
- Postal codes: 387 01, 387 06
- Website: www.obecmalenice.cz

Malenice is a municipality and village in Strakonice District in the South Bohemian Region of the Czech Republic. It has about 700 inhabitants.

Malenice lies on the Volyňka river, approximately 16 kilometres (10 mi) south of Strakonice, 47 km (29 mi) west of České Budějovice, and 114 km (71 mi) south of Prague.

== Administrative division ==
Malenice consists of three municipal parts (in brackets population according to the 2021 census):

- Malenice (645)
- Straňovice (1)
- Zlešice (44)

== Demographics ==
Historical population
Year	Pop.	±%
1869	810	—
1880	860	+6.2%
1890	817	−5.0%
1900	848	+3.8%
1910	850	+0.2%
1921	901	+6.0%
1930	754	−16.3%
1950	635	−15.8%
1961	629	−0.9%
1970	640	+1.7%
1980	588	−8.1%
1991	562	−4.4%
2001	595	+5.9%
2011	656	+10.3%
2021	690	+5.2%
Source: Censuses

== Notable people ==
- Zdeněk Podskalský (1923–1993), film director and screenwriter
