= Vimperk =

- Town
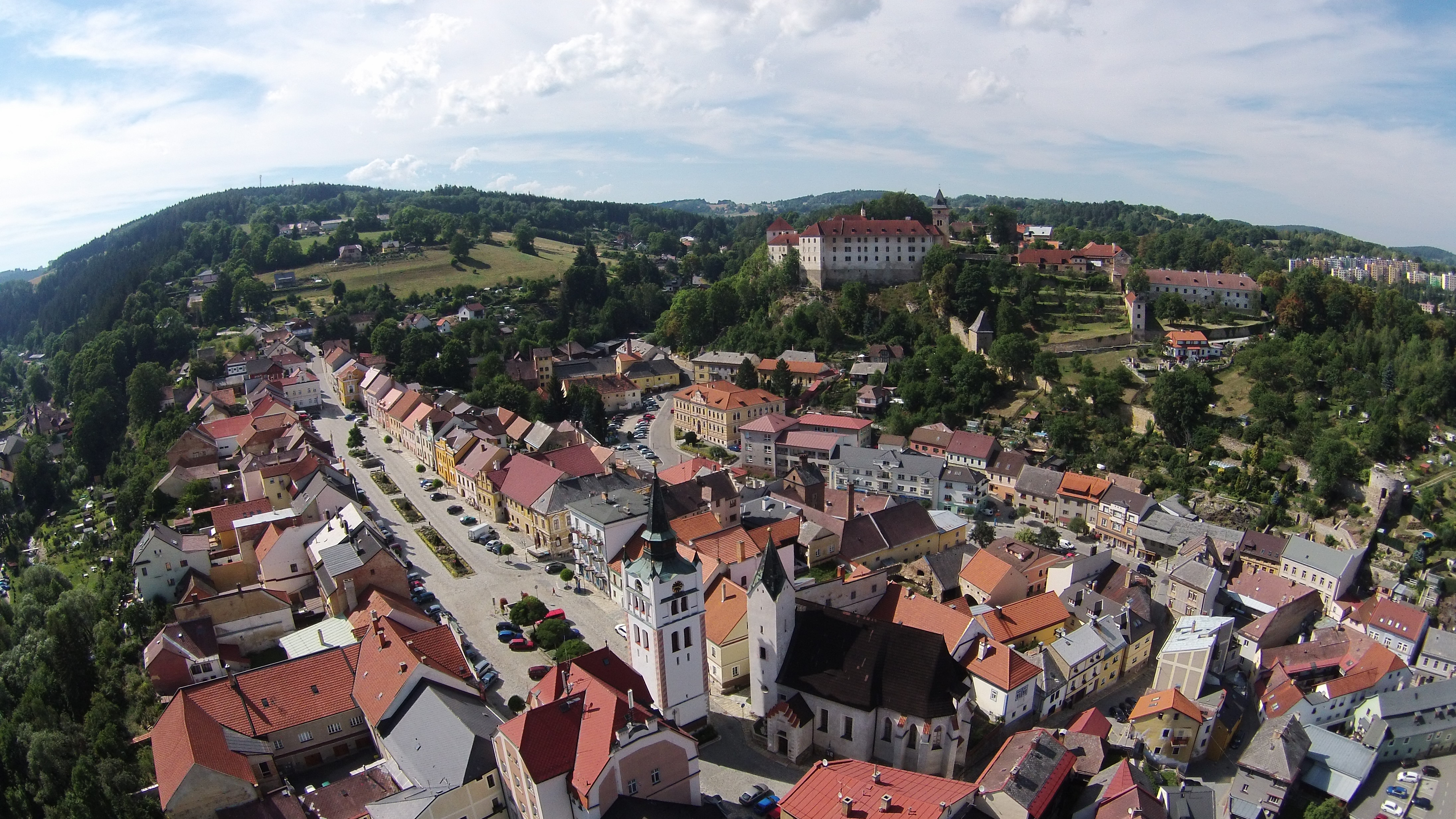
- Vimperk Castle above the town centre

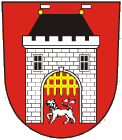
- Flag Coat of arms

- Location in the Czech Republic
- Coordinates: 49°3′9″N 13°46′27″E
- Country: Czech Republic
- Region: South Bohemian
- District: Prachatice
- First mentioned: 1251

Government
  - Mayor: Jaroslava Martanová

Area
  - Total: 80.04 km^{2} (30.90 sq mi)
- Elevation: 694 m (2,277 ft)

Population (2026-01-01)
  - Total: 7,270
  - Density: 90.8/km^{2} (235/sq mi)
- Time zone: UTC+1 (CET)
  - Summer (DST): UTC+2 (CEST)
- Postal code: 385 01
- Website: www.vimperk.cz

Vimperk (Czech pronunciation: [ˈvɪmpɛrk]; German: Winterberg) is a town in Prachatice District in the South Bohemian Region of the Czech Republic. It has about 7,300 inhabitants. The town is located on the Volyňka River, on the border between the Bohemian Forest mountain range and Bohemian Forest Foothills.

Historically Vimperk has been known as an important regional trade centre, being located on the Golden Trail from Passau to Prachatice. Vimperk is also renowned for its glass-making and printing traditions. The historic town centre is well preserved and is protected as an urban monument zone. The main landmark of the town is the Vimperk Castle.

== Administrative division ==
Vimperk consists of 22 municipal parts (in brackets population according to the 2021 census):

- Vimperk I (504)
- Vimperk II (5,460)
- Vimperk III (375)
- Arnoštka (6)
- Bořanovice (72)
- Boubská (101)
- Cejsice (18)
- Hrabice (124)
- Klášterec (32)
- Korkusova Huť (35)
- Křesanov (37)
- Lipka (83)
- Michlova Huť (12)
- Modlenice (3)
- Pravětín (85)
- Skláře (23)
- Solná Lhota (14)
- Sudslavice (35)
- U Sloupů (84)
- Veselka (8)
- Vnarovy (14)
- Výškovice (60)

== Etymology ==
The initial German name of Vimperk was Winterberg, meaning 'winter mountain'. The name probably reflected the abundance of snow in the area. The Czech name was created by transcription of the German name.

== Geography ==
Vimperk is located about 17 kilometres (11 mi) south of Prachatice and 50 km (31 mi) west of České Budějovice. The southern half of the municipal territory lies the Bohemian Forest mountain range and is protected as the Šumava Protected Landscape Area, and the northern part lies in the Bohemian Forest Foothills. The highest point is the Šerava mountain at 1,061 m (3,481 ft) above sea level. Other high mountains include Kamenná hora at 1,057 m (3,468 ft) and Kupa at 1,044 m (3,425 ft). The town is situated in the Volyňka River valley.

=== Climate ===
Climate data for Vimperk (1991–2021)
Month	Jan	Feb	Mar	Apr	May	Jun	Jul	Aug	Sep	Oct	Nov	Dec	Year
Mean daily maximum °C (°F)	0.4 (32.7)	1.9 (35.4)	6.3 (43.3)	12.2 (54.0)	16.2 (61.2)	19.5 (67.1)	21.2 (70.2)	21.1 (70.0)	16.6 (61.9)	11.9 (53.4)	6.1 (43.0)	1.8 (35.2)	10.6 (51.1)
Daily mean °C (°F)	−2.5 (27.5)	−1.7 (28.9)	2.1 (35.8)	7.4 (45.3)	11.9 (53.4)	15.5 (59.9)	17.1 (62.8)	16.9 (62.4)	12.6 (54.7)	8.0 (46.4)	3.0 (37.4)	−0.9 (30.4)	7.4 (45.3)
Mean daily minimum °C (°F)	−5.3 (22.5)	−5.0 (23.0)	−1.8 (28.8)	2.5 (36.5)	7.2 (45.0)	10.9 (51.6)	12.7 (54.9)	12.6 (54.7)	8.8 (47.8)	4.7 (40.5)	0.2 (32.4)	−3.4 (25.9)	1.7 (35.1)
Average precipitation mm (inches)	70 (2.8)	56 (2.2)	76 (3.0)	74 (2.9)	120 (4.7)	138 (5.4)	147 (5.8)	125 (4.9)	86 (3.4)	67 (2.6)	63 (2.5)	68 (2.7)	1,090 (42.9)
Source: Climate-Data.org

== History ==
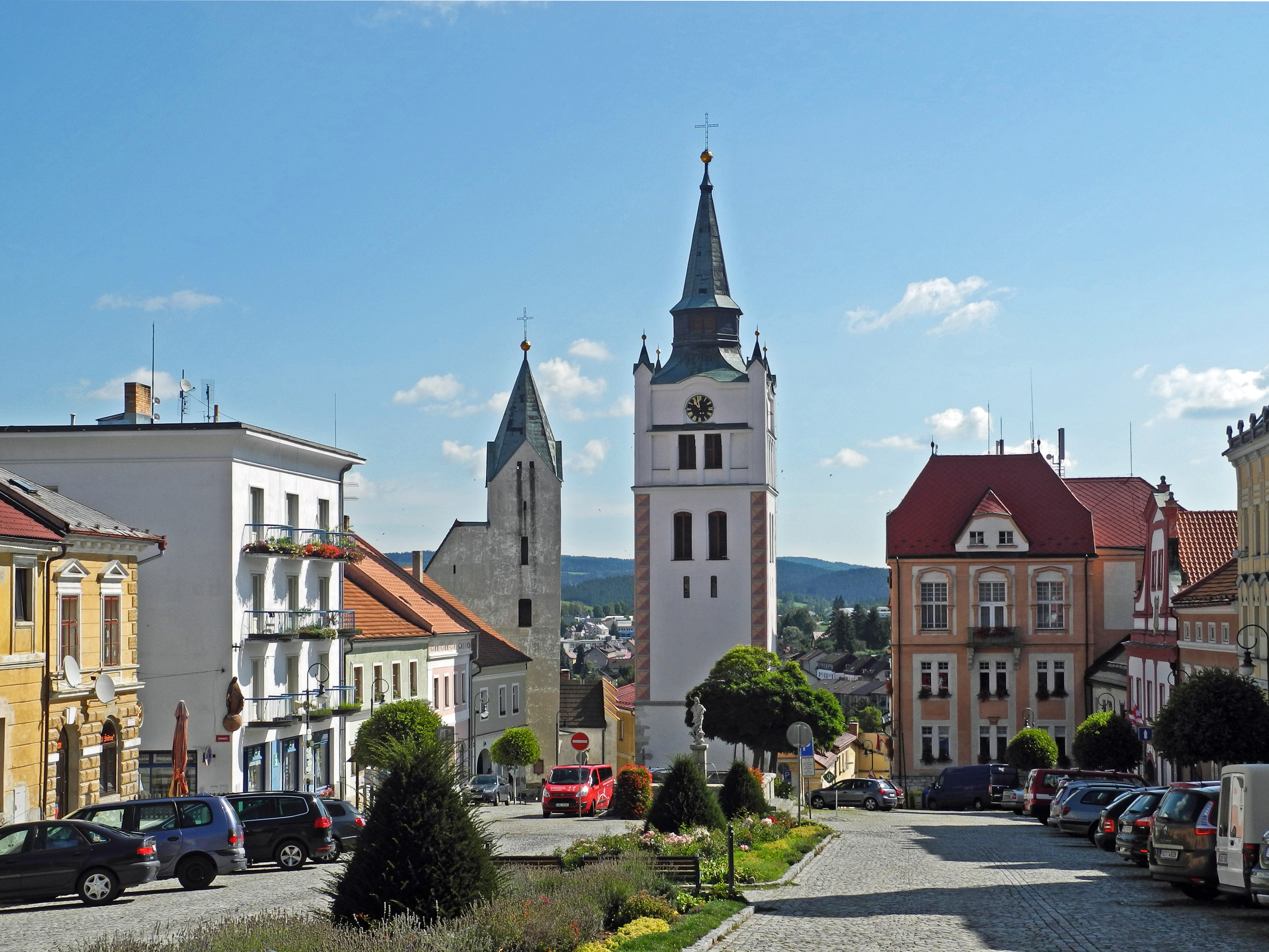
Town square with Church of the Visitation of the Virgin Mary

The whole area was covered by deep forest until the middle of the 13th century, when the Vimperk Castle was founded. The castle was most likely founded by King Ottokar II to protect the border and the new branch of the Golden Trail, the important trade route from Passau to Bohemia. In the 1260s, Ottokar II lent the manor and the castle, which included the walled fortress with a tower house and a palace, to the noble family of Janovic. In 1370, the properties of Janovic family forfeited to the royal crown.

From the end of the 14th century, the Vimperk estate was a property of the Kaplíř of Sulevice noble family. During their rule, the settlement and the castle were merged into a single fortified unit and an outpost, mighty round tower Haselburg, was built. Despite the era of the Hussite Wars, Vimperk prospered, and in 1479, it was granted the town rights by King Vladislaus II. After it was owned by the Malovec of Chýnov family for a short period, Vimperk was acquired by the Rosenberg family in the 16th century. During their rule, the trade on the Golden Trail reached its peak. Probably during the 16th century the castle began to be rebuilt into the Renaissance residence.

During the war in 1547 led by Czech Protestants against the King Ferdinand I, the citizens of Vimperk sided with the Czech Protestants. After Ferdinand's eventual triumph he gained Vimperk among his spoils. In 1553 he sold Vimperk to Jáchym of Hradec, but it was seized by William of Rosenberg. William's brother Peter Vok of Rosenberg (the last member of the Rosenberg family) sold the town in 1601 to Volf Novohradský of Kolowrat, who sided with the Czech Protestants during the rebellion of 1618.

Between 1622 and 1624, Jáchym Novohradský of Kolowrat built new castle buildings over portions of the castle that had been destroyed. This construction and other expensive activities ruined him financially so that he was forced in to sell the castle in 1630 to Oldřich, Count of Eggenberg. The Eggenberg family owned Vimperk Castle until 1719, when the House of Eggenberg died out and all of the Eggenberg holdings, including the Český Krumlov estate, fell to the Schwarzenberg family.

In 1857, the town suffered yet another fire which caused extensive damage to many of the buildings on the main town square and to the castle. A fundraising was announced, to which Emperor Franz Joseph I also contributed, and within a year all the houses were repaired.

After the end of World War I, by 24 November 1918, the town became part of Czechoslovakia.

In 1938, Vimperk was annexed by Nazi Germany and administered as part of the Reichsgau Sudetenland. All non-Germanic people were expelled. At the end of World War II, all German people were expelled from Vimperk. In 1945, American Allied Forces liberated Vimperk, which is commemorated by a plaque in the centre of the town.

In the 19th century, Vimperk became an industrial centre of the Bohemian Forest region. The industrial character of the town remained in the years 1945–1989. After 1989, the industry began to decline and many businesses closed. The town began to focus more on tourism.

== Demographics ==
Historical population

Year	Pop.	±%
1869	6,656	—
1880	7,224	+8.5%
1890	7,751	+7.3%
1900	8,320	+7.3%
1910	8,768	+5.4%

Year	Pop.	±%
1921	8,172	−6.8%
1930	8,674	+6.1%
1950	5,288	−39.0%
1961	6,073	+14.8%
1970	6,657	+9.6%

Year	Pop.	±%
1980	7,257	+9.0%
1991	8,090	+11.5%
2001	8,281	+2.4%
2011	7,487	−9.6%
2021	7,185	−4.0%

Source: Censuses

== Economy ==
The largest employer based in the town is a branch of the Rohde & Schwarz company, which is a manufacturer of electrical devices. It has more than 900 employees and belongs to the largest employers in the entire region.

== Transport ==
The I/4 road, which connects Strakonice with the Czech–German border, runs through the town.

Vimperk is located on the railway line Strakonice–Volary.

== Sights ==
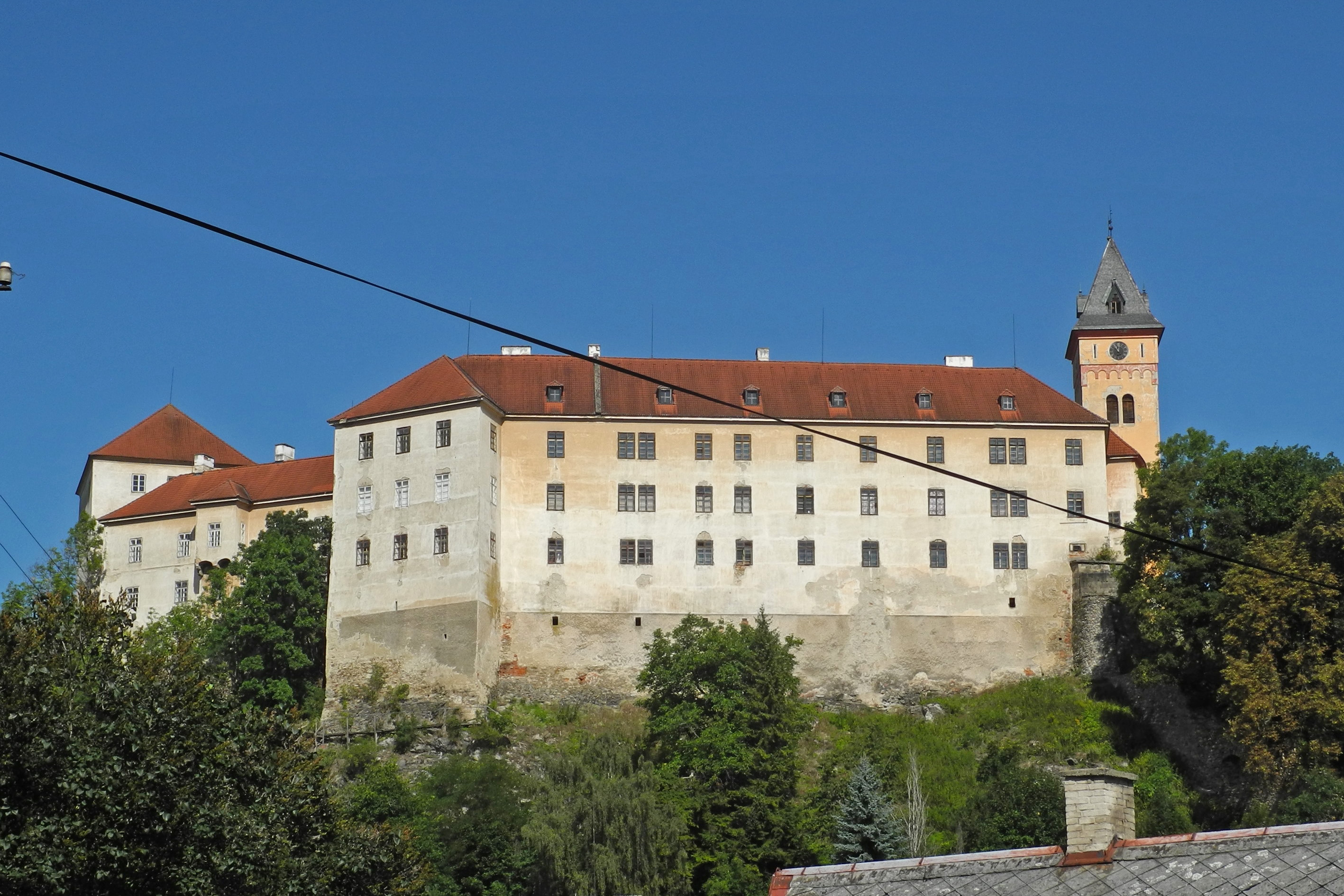
Vimperk Castle

The main landmark of Vimperk is the Vimperk Castle. The Schwarzenberg family was the last private proprietor of the castle. In 1947, the Vimperk Castle was nationalised by the Czechoslovak state. Since 2015, it has been owned by the National Heritage Institute. A part of the property serves as a museum, and the headquarters of the Šumava National Park and Šumava Protected Landscape Area are also located there.

There are three churches in Vimperk: Church of Saint Bartholomew, Church of the Visitation of the Virgin Mary, and Church of the Most Sacred Heart of Jesus. Church of Saint Bartholomew is oldest sacral building in the town. It was built in the second half of the 13th century in its today's form is in the pseudo-Gothic style. The Church of the Visitation of the Virgin Mary is located on the town square and since its construction it has been the spiritual centre of Vimperk. It was built in the 14th century, before 1365.

== Notable people ==
- Albert Popper (1808–1889), mayor of Vimperk
- Tereza Huříková (born 1987), road cyclist and mountain biker
- Šimon Hrubec (born 1991), ice hockey player
- Ivana Mrázová (born 1992), Italian model

== Twin towns – sister cities ==
Vimperk is twinned with:

- Freyung, Germany
