= Strunkovice nad Volyňkou =

- Municipality
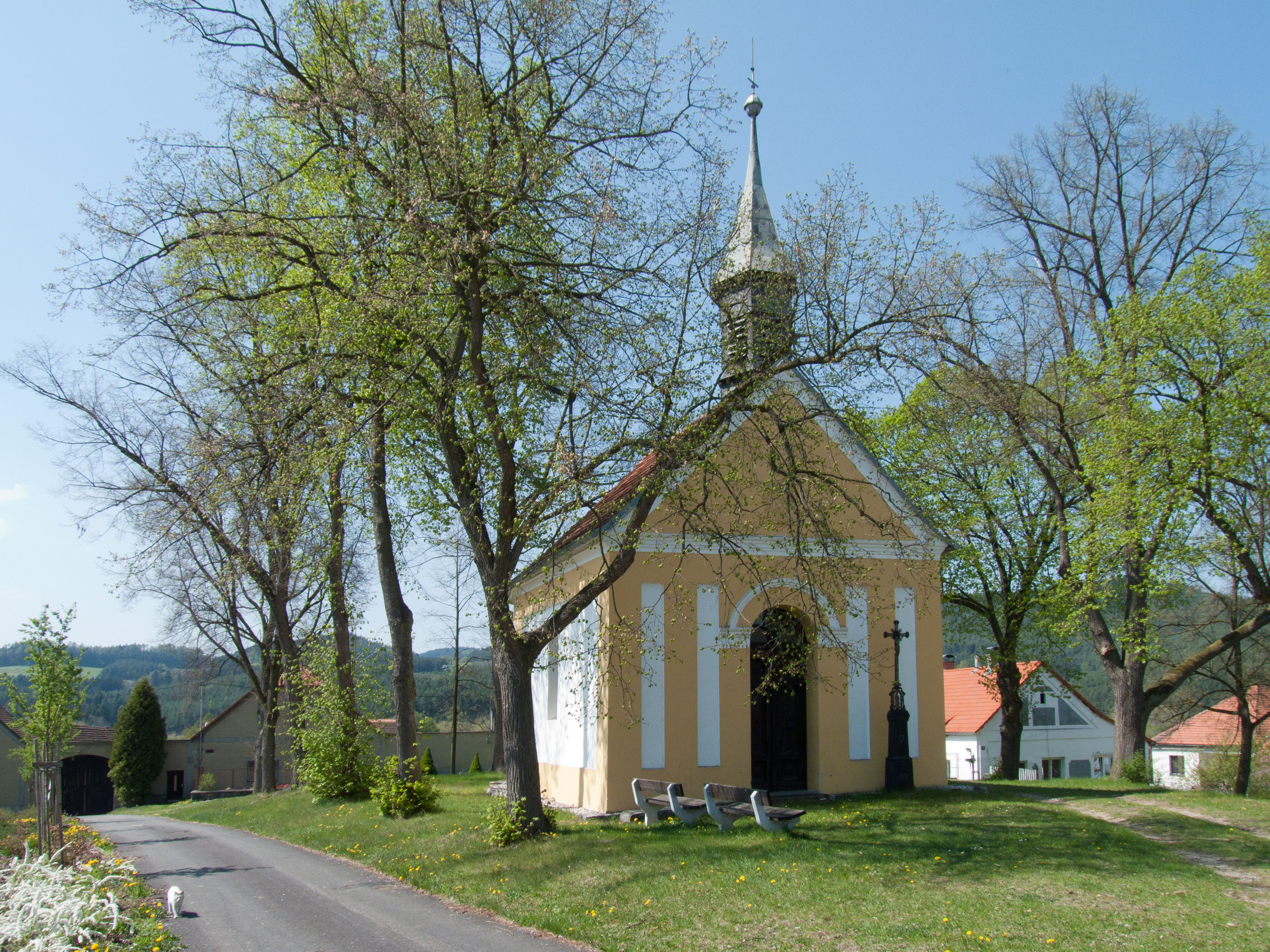
- Chapel of Saint John of Nepomuk

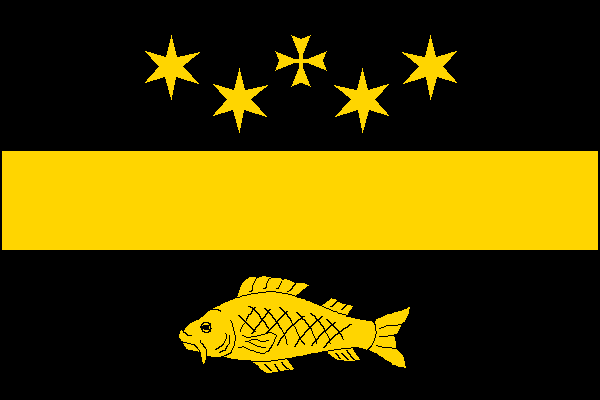
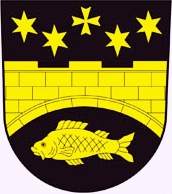
- Flag Coat of arms

- Location in the Czech Republic
- Coordinates: 49°12′31″N 13°53′22″E
- Country: Czech Republic
- Region: South Bohemian
- District: Strakonice
- First mentioned: 1227

Area
  - Total: 3.79 km^{2} (1.46 sq mi)
- Elevation: 442 m (1,450 ft)

Population (2026-01-01)
  - Total: 135
  - Density: 35.6/km^{2} (92.3/sq mi)
- Time zone: UTC+1 (CET)
  - Summer (DST): UTC+2 (CEST)
- Postal code: 387 01
- Website: www.strunkovice.cz

Strunkovice nad Volyňkou is a municipality and village in Strakonice District in the South Bohemian Region of the Czech Republic. It has about 100 inhabitants.

Strunkovice nad Volyňkou lies approximately 7 kilometres (4 mi) south of Strakonice, 50 km (31 mi) north-west of České Budějovice, and 105 km (65 mi) south of Prague.

== Etymology ==
The name Strunkovice is derived from the surname Strunka, meaning "the village of Strunka's people". The suffix nad Volyňkou means 'upon the Volyňka'.

== Demographics ==
Historical population
Year	Pop.	±%
1869	203	—
1880	235	+15.8%
1890	252	+7.2%
1900	270	+7.1%
1910	293	+8.5%
1921	293	+0.0%
1930	304	+3.8%
1950	220	−27.6%
1961	220	+0.0%
1970	186	−15.5%
1980	150	−19.4%
1991	128	−14.7%
2001	112	−12.5%
2011	106	−5.4%
2021	138	+30.2%
Source: Censuses
