= Radošovice (České Budějovice District) =

- Municipality
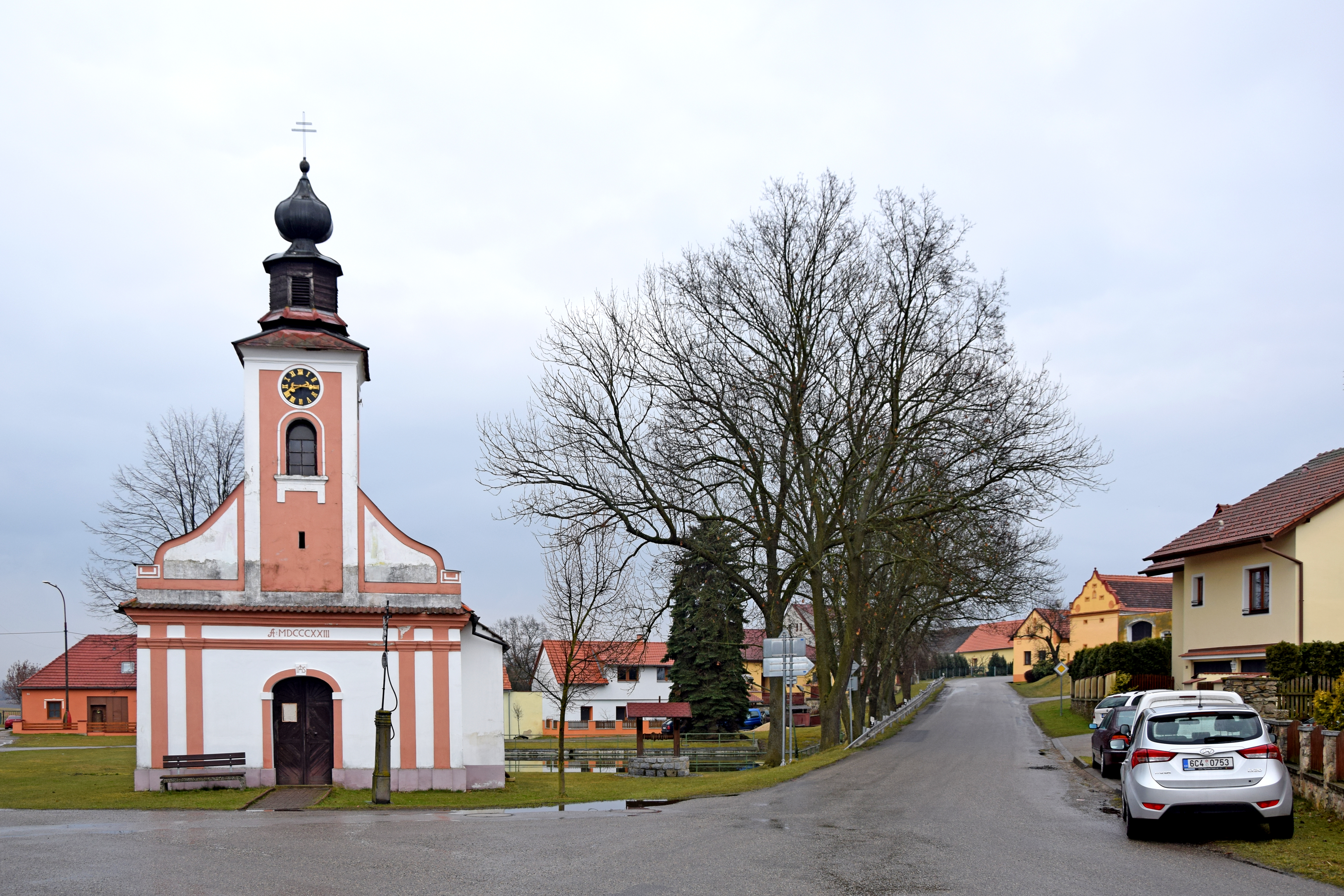
- Chapel of the Virgin Mary

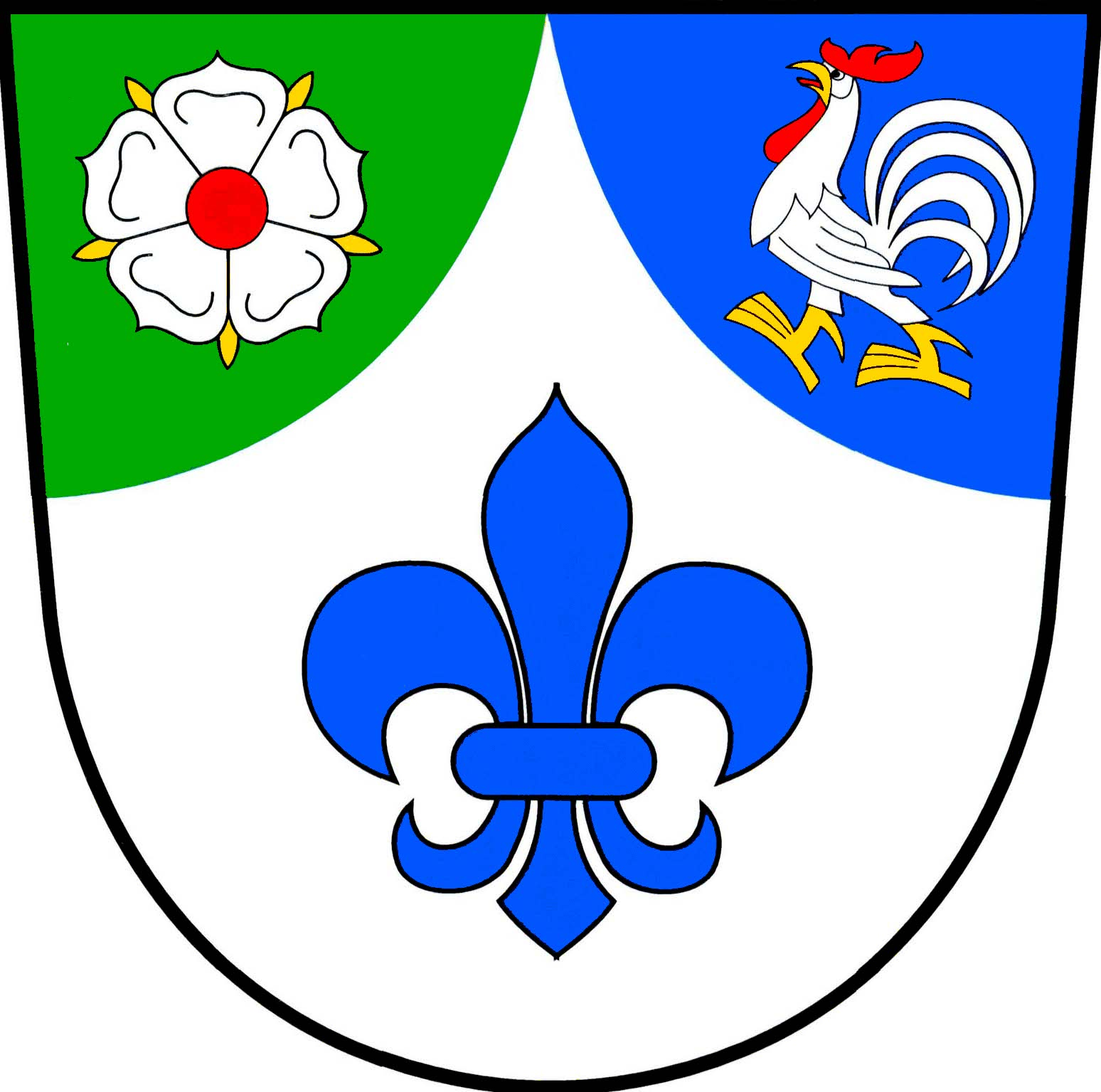
- Flag Coat of arms

- Location in the Czech Republic
- Coordinates: 49°1′11″N 14°16′23″E
- Country: Czech Republic
- Region: South Bohemian
- District: České Budějovice
- First mentioned: 1334

Area
  - Total: 9.09 km^{2} (3.51 sq mi)
- Elevation: 433 m (1,421 ft)

Population (2026-01-01)
  - Total: 212
  - Density: 23.3/km^{2} (60.4/sq mi)
- Time zone: UTC+1 (CET)
  - Summer (DST): UTC+2 (CEST)
- Postal code: 373 41
- Website: www.obecradosovice.cz

Radošovice is a municipality and village in České Budějovice District in the South Bohemian Region of the Czech Republic. It has about 200 inhabitants.

Radošovice lies approximately 16 kilometres (10 mi) west of České Budějovice and 119 km (74 mi) south of Prague.

== Administrative division ==
Radošovice consists of two municipal parts (in brackets population according to the 2021 census):

- Radošovice (125)
- Tupesy (49)

== Demographics ==
Historical population
Year	Pop.	±%
1869	388	—
1880	435	+12.1%
1890	397	−8.7%
1900	389	−2.0%
1910	349	−10.3%
1921	323	−7.4%
1930	311	−3.7%
1950	224	−28.0%
1961	237	+5.8%
1970	179	−24.5%
1980	186	+3.9%
1991	173	−7.0%
2001	167	−3.5%
2011	174	+4.2%
2021	174	+0.0%
Source: Censuses
