= Radošovice (Benešov District) =

- Municipality
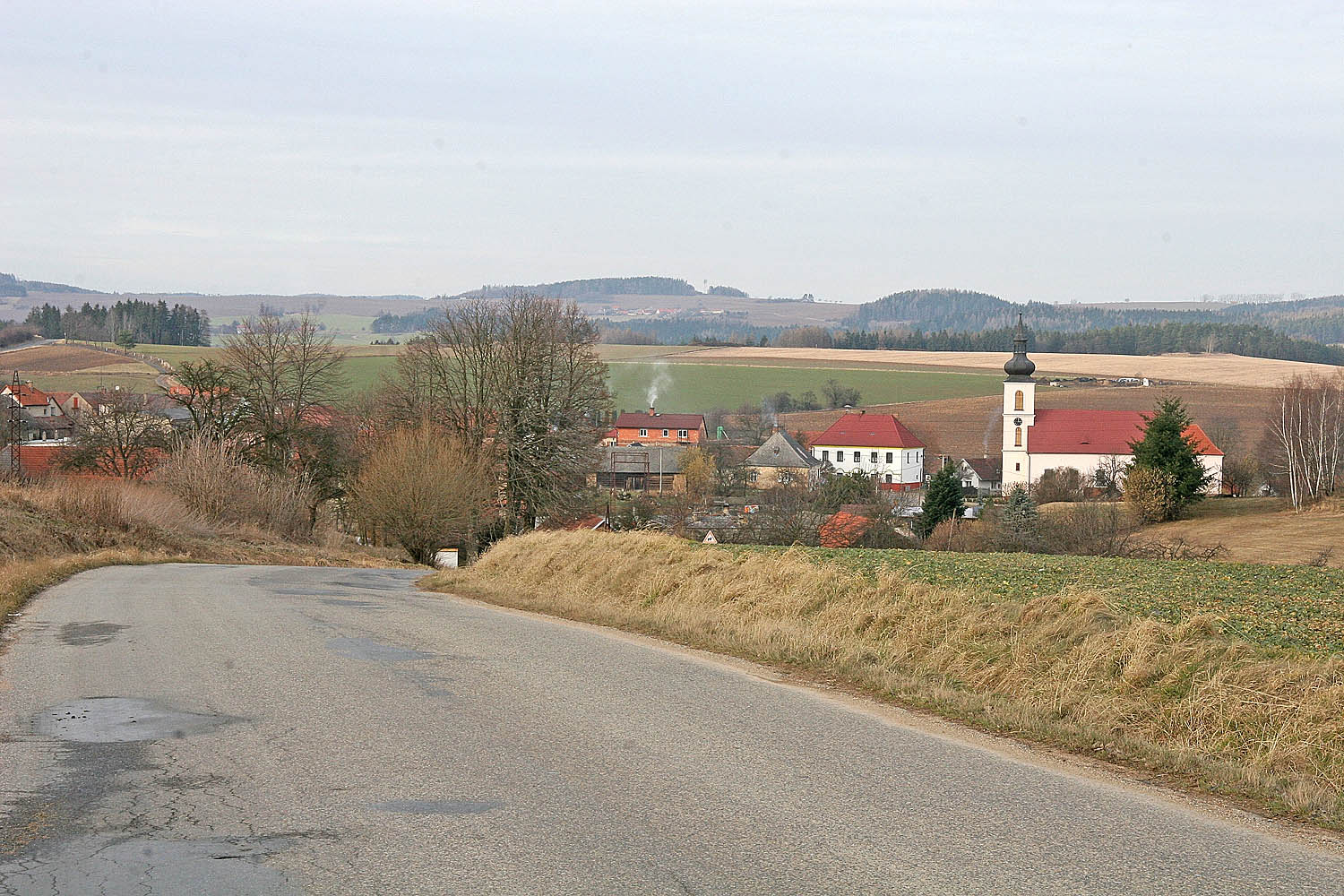
- View from the south

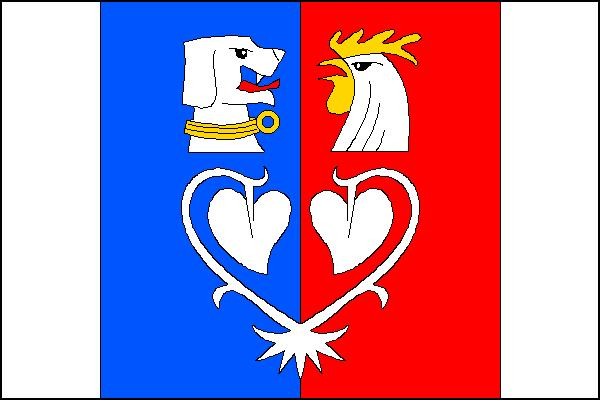
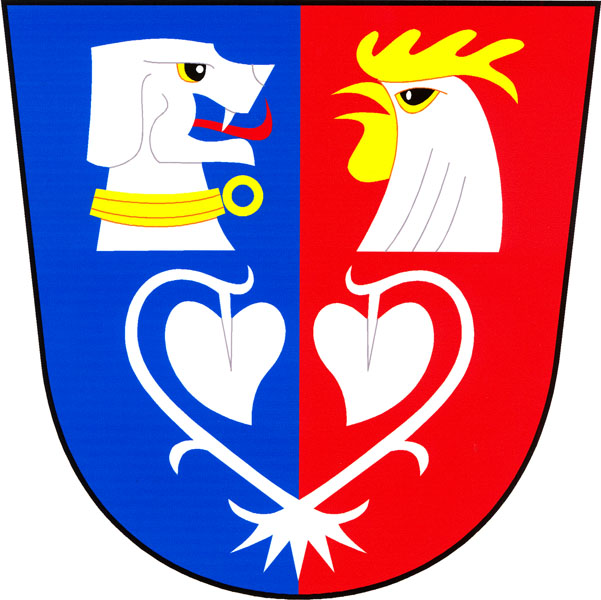
- Flag Coat of arms

- Location in the Czech Republic
- Coordinates: 49°44′28″N 14°52′3″E
- Country: Czech Republic
- Region: Central Bohemian
- District: Benešov
- First mentioned: 1318

Area
  - Total: 8.03 km^{2} (3.10 sq mi)
- Elevation: 405 m (1,329 ft)

Population (2026-01-01)
  - Total: 406
  - Density: 50.6/km^{2} (131/sq mi)
- Time zone: UTC+1 (CET)
  - Summer (DST): UTC+2 (CEST)
- Postal code: 257 26
- Website: www.radosovice.eu

Radošovice is a municipality and village in Benešov District in the Central Bohemian Region of the Czech Republic. It has about 400 inhabitants.

== Administrative division ==
Radošovice consists of three municipal parts (in brackets population according to the 2021 census):

- Radošovice (355)
- Lipiny u Radošovic (11)
- Onšovice (38)

== Etymology ==
The name is derived from the personal name Radoš, meaning "the village of Radoš's people".

== Geography ==
Radošovice is located about 13 kilometres (8 mi) east of Benešov and 41 km (25 mi) southeast of Prague. It lies mostly in the Vlašim Uplands, but the western part of the municipal territory extends into the Benešov Uplands. The highest point is at 480 m (1,570 ft) above sea level. The Chotýšanka River flows along the western and northern municipal border.

== History ==
The first written mention of Radošovice is from 1318.

== Demographics ==
Historical population

Year	Pop.	±%
1869	627	—
1880	653	+4.1%
1890	624	−4.4%
1900	595	−4.6%
1910	576	−3.2%

Year	Pop.	±%
1921	584	+1.4%
1930	502	−14.0%
1950	429	−14.5%
1961	388	−9.6%
1970	378	−2.6%

Year	Pop.	±%
1980	348	−7.9%
1991	298	−14.4%
2001	297	−0.3%
2011	322	+8.4%
2021	404	+25.5%

Source: Censuses

== Transport ==
There are no railways or major roads passing through the municipality.

== Sights ==
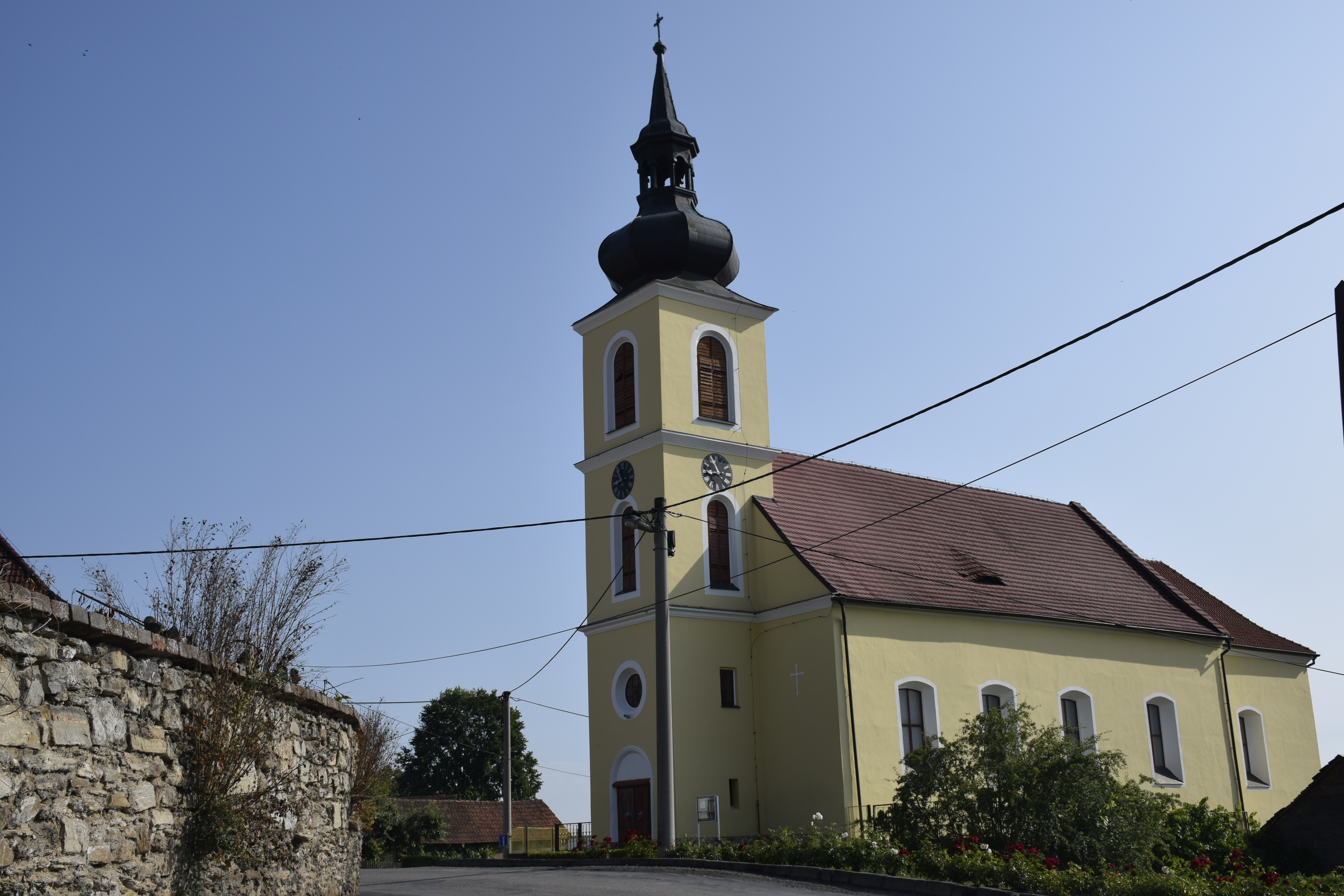
Church of Saint Vitus

The main landmark of Radošovice is the Church of Saint Vitus. Its oldest parts are from the early Gothic period. The church was rebuilt in the Gothic style, then in the Baroque style. Its current appearance is the result of modern modifications.
