= Němětice =

- Municipality
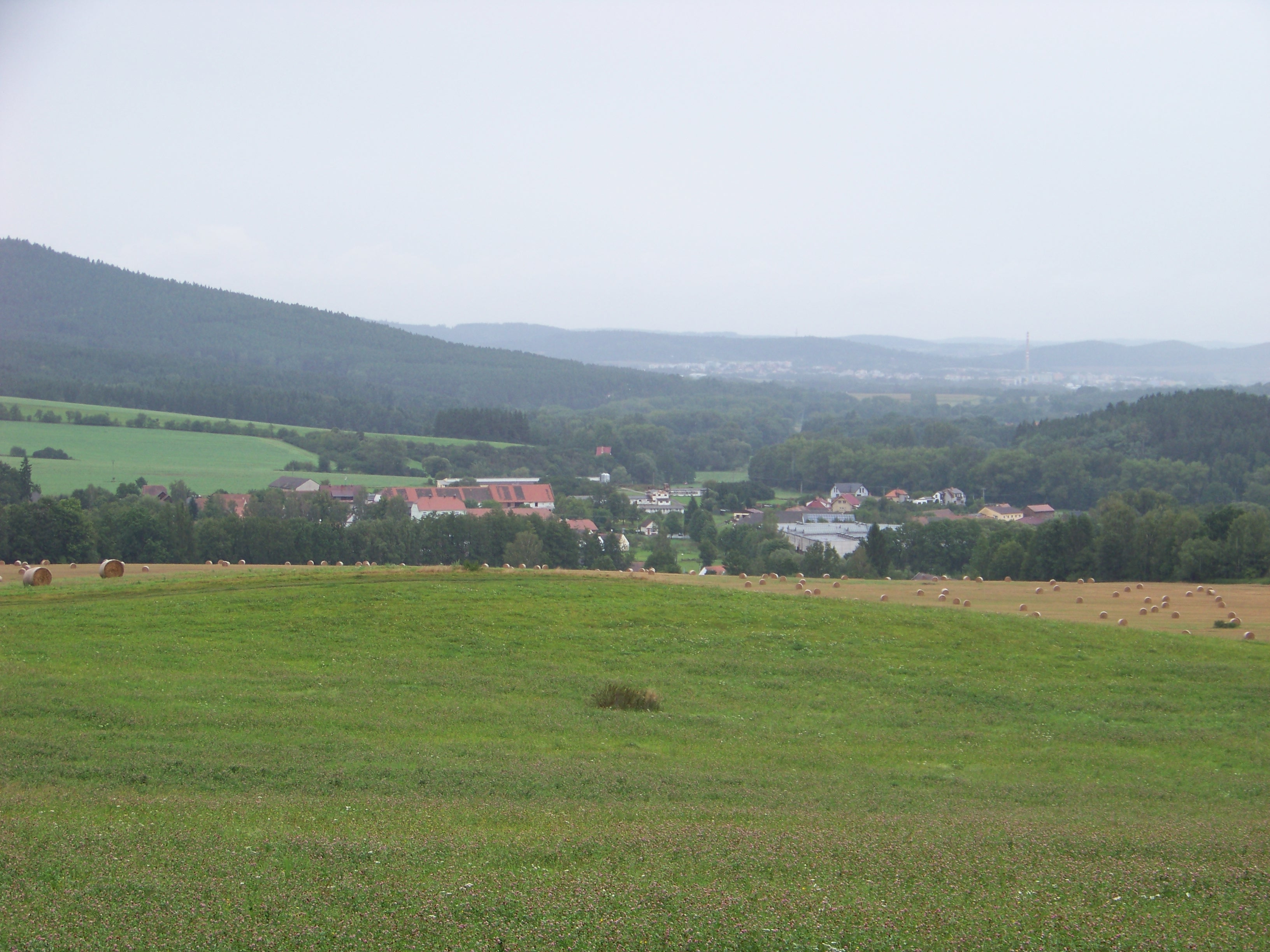
- View from the south

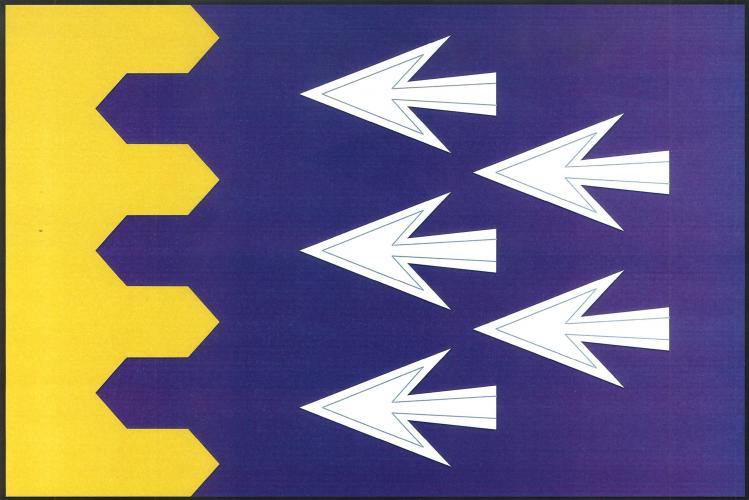
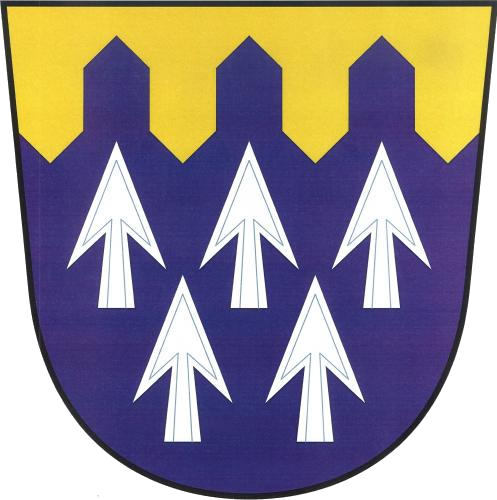
- Flag Coat of arms

- Location in the Czech Republic
- Coordinates: 49°11′41″N 13°52′44″E
- Country: Czech Republic
- Region: South Bohemian
- District: Strakonice
- First mentioned: 1315

Area
  - Total: 3.69 km^{2} (1.42 sq mi)
- Elevation: 438 m (1,437 ft)

Population (2026-01-01)
  - Total: 125
  - Density: 33.9/km^{2} (87.7/sq mi)
- Time zone: UTC+1 (CET)
  - Summer (DST): UTC+2 (CEST)
- Postal code: 387 01
- Website: www.nemetice.eu

Němětice is a municipality and village in Strakonice District in the South Bohemian Region of the Czech Republic. It has about 100 inhabitants.

Němětice lies approximately 8 kilometres (5 mi) south of Strakonice, 50 km (31 mi) north-west of České Budějovice, and 107 km (66 mi) south of Prague.

== Demographics ==
Historical population
| Year | Pop. | ±% |
|---|---|---|
| 1869 | 198 | — |
| 1880 | 205 | +3.5% |
| 1890 | 188 | −8.3% |
| 1900 | 200 | +6.4% |
| 1910 | 201 | +0.5% |
| 1921 | 203 | +1.0% |
| 1930 | 185 | −8.9% |
| 1950 | 159 | −14.1% |
| 1961 | 147 | −7.5% |
| 1970 | 129 | −12.2% |
| 1980 | 139 | +7.8% |
| 1991 | 115 | −17.3% |
| 2001 | 111 | −3.5% |
| 2011 | 116 | +4.5% |
| 2021 | 113 | −2.6% |
Source: Censuses
