= Mutěnice (Strakonice District) =

- Municipality
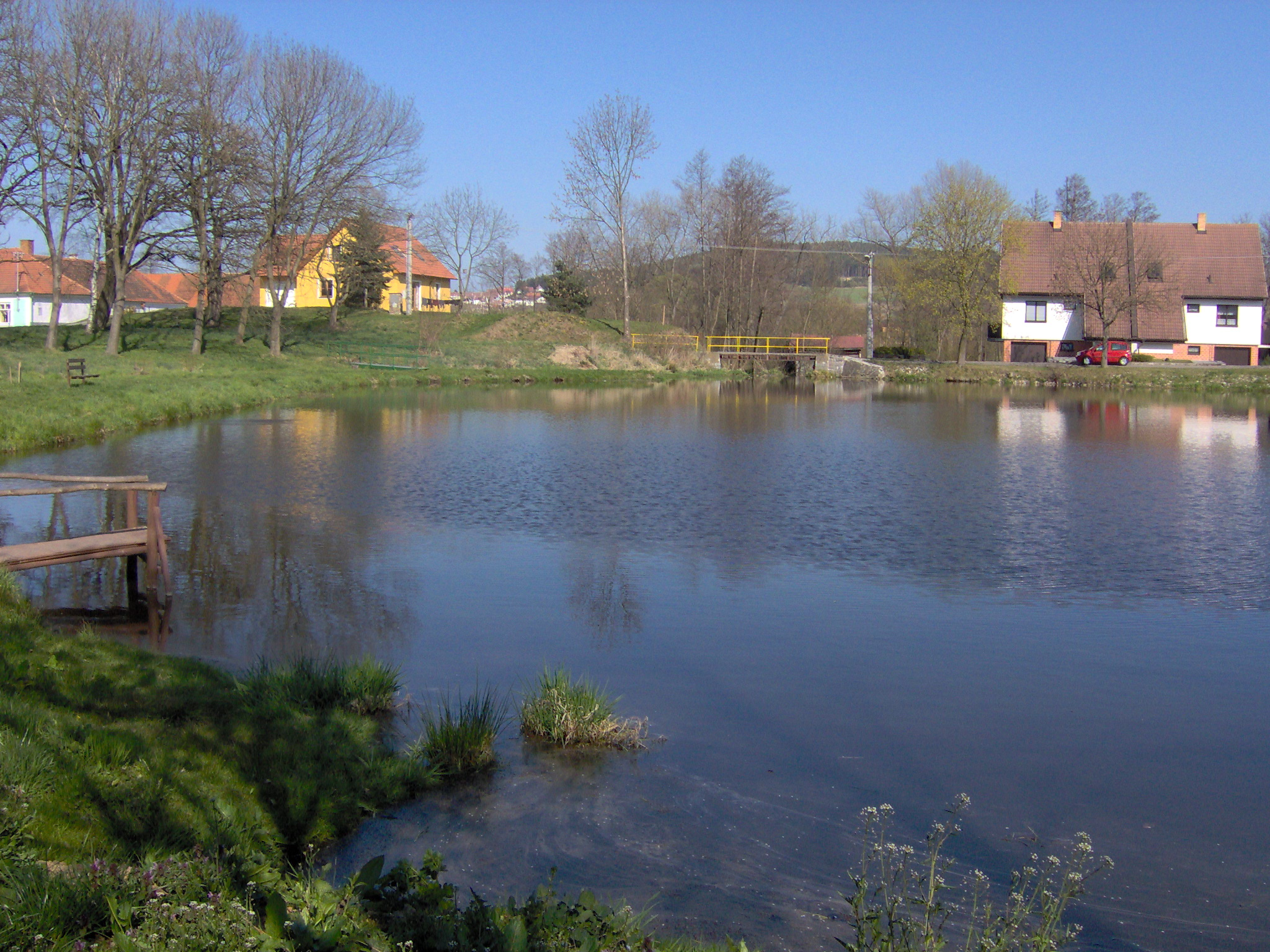
- Okoun pond in the centre of Mutěnice

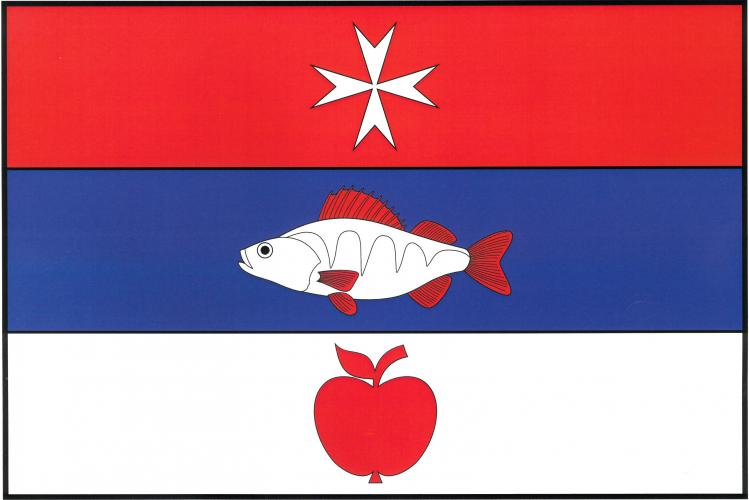
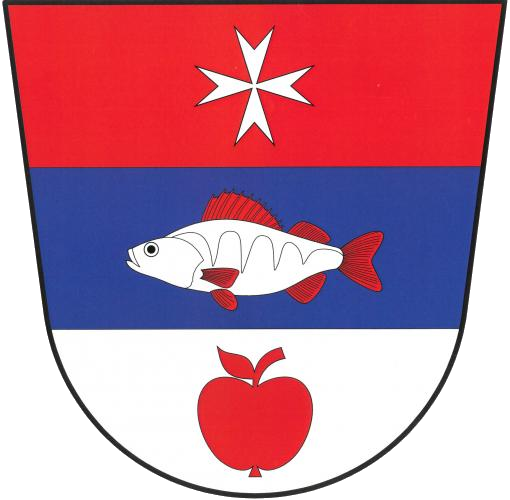
- Flag Coat of arms

- Location in the Czech Republic
- Coordinates: 49°14′23″N 13°53′48″E
- Country: Czech Republic
- Region: South Bohemian
- District: Strakonice
- First mentioned: 1243

Area
  - Total: 2.28 km^{2} (0.88 sq mi)
- Elevation: 406 m (1,332 ft)

Population (2026-01-01)
  - Total: 273
  - Density: 120/km^{2} (310/sq mi)
- Time zone: UTC+1 (CET)
  - Summer (DST): UTC+2 (CEST)
- Postal code: 386 01
- Website: www.obecmutenice.cz

Mutěnice is a municipality and village in Strakonice District in the South Bohemian Region of the Czech Republic. It has about 300 inhabitants.

Mutěnice lies approximately 3 kilometres (2 mi) south-west of Strakonice, 52 km (32 mi) north-west of České Budějovice, and 102 km (63 mi) south of Prague.

== Demographics ==
Historical population
Year	Pop.	±%
1869	226	—
1880	247	+9.3%
1890	230	−6.9%
1900	216	−6.1%
1910	195	−9.7%
1921	220	+12.8%
1930	277	+25.9%
1950	286	+3.2%
1961	294	+2.8%
1970	269	−8.5%
1980	217	−19.3%
1991	161	−25.8%
2001	191	+18.6%
2011	208	+8.9%
2021	254	+22.1%
Source: Censuses
