= Radošovice (Strakonice District) =

- Municipality
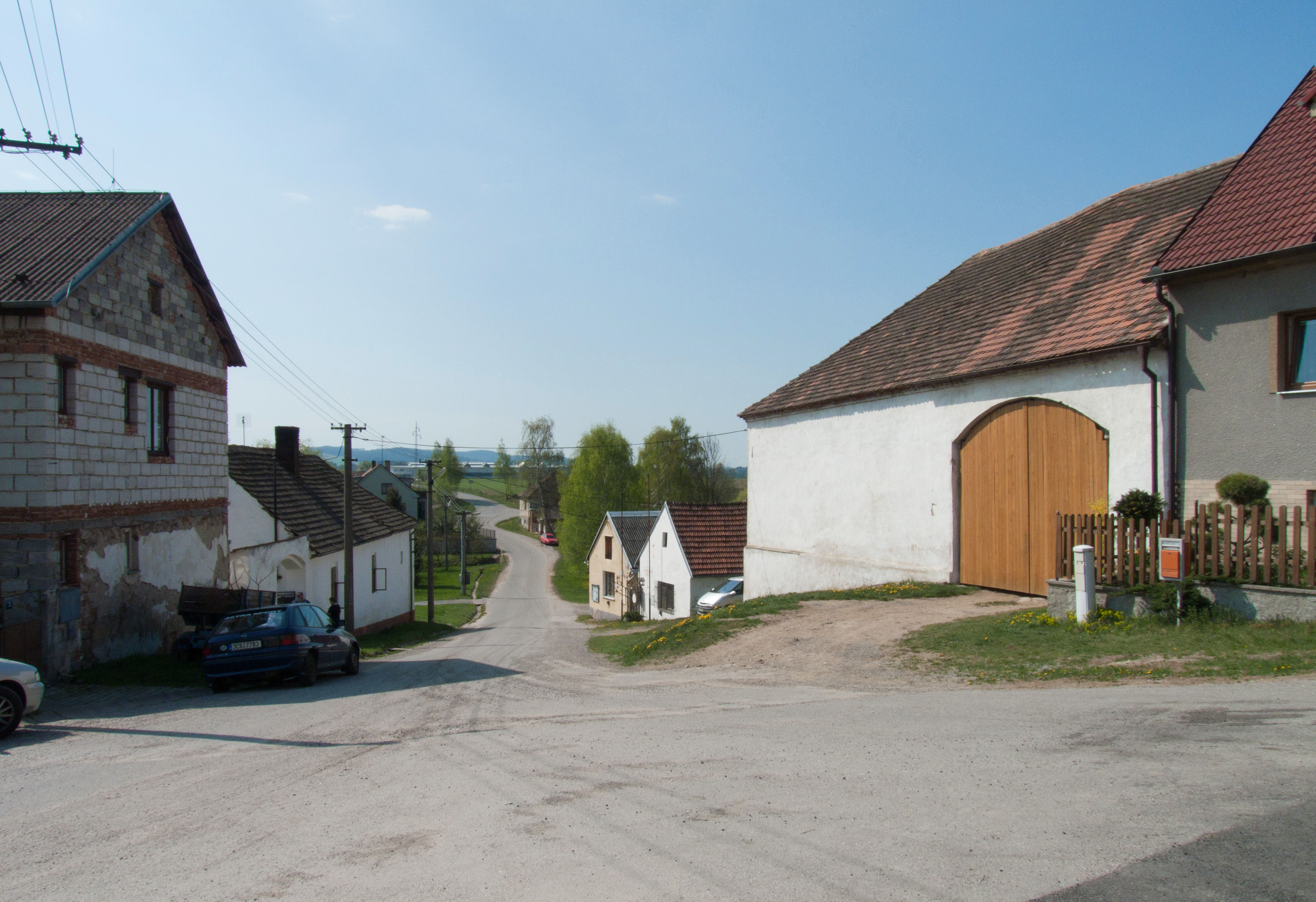
- Kapsova Lhota, a part of Radošovice

- Location in the Czech Republic
- Coordinates: 49°14′0″N 13°53′55″E
- Country: Czech Republic
- Region: South Bohemian
- District: Strakonice
- First mentioned: 1243

Area
  - Total: 10.21 km^{2} (3.94 sq mi)
- Elevation: 413 m (1,355 ft)

Population (2026-01-01)
  - Total: 635
  - Density: 62.2/km^{2} (161/sq mi)
- Time zone: UTC+1 (CET)
  - Summer (DST): UTC+2 (CEST)
- Postal code: 386 01
- Website: www.ouradosovice.cz

Radošovice is a municipality and village in Strakonice District in the South Bohemian Region of the Czech Republic. It has about 600 inhabitants.

Radošovice lies approximately 4 kilometres (2 mi) south of Strakonice, 51 km (32 mi) north-west of České Budějovice, and 103 km (64 mi) south of Prague.

== Administrative division ==
Radošovice consists of five municipal parts (in brackets population according to the 2021 census):

- Radošovice (476)
- Jedraž (1)
- Kapsova Lhota (90)
- Milíkovice (24)
- Svaryšov (38)

== Demographics ==
Historical population
Year	Pop.	±%
1869	691	—
1880	732	+5.9%
1890	729	−0.4%
1900	774	+6.2%
1910	704	−9.0%
1921	716	+1.7%
1930	690	−3.6%
1950	600	−13.0%
1961	566	−5.7%
1970	523	−7.6%
1980	518	−1.0%
1991	540	+4.2%
2001	520	−3.7%
2011	646	+24.2%
2021	629	−2.6%
Source: Censuses
