= Běleč =

Běleč may refer to places in the Czech Republic:

- Běleč (Brno-Country District), a municipality and village in the South Moravian Region
- Běleč (Kladno District), a municipality and village in the Central Bohemian Region
- Běleč (Tábor District), a municipality and village in the South Bohemian Region
- Běleč, a village and part of Liteň in the Central Bohemian Region
- Běleč, a village and part of Těšovice (Prachatice District) in the South Bohemian Region
- Běleč nad Orlicí, a municipality and village in the Hradec Králové Region
