= Belec =

Belec may refer to:

- Belec, Croatia, a village near Zlatar
- Běleč (Brno-Country District), a municipality and village in the South Moravian Region
- Běleč (Kladno District), a municipality and village in the Central Bohemian Region
- Běleč (Tábor District), a municipality and village in the South Bohemian Region
- Běleč, a village and part of Liteň in the Central Bohemian Region
- Běleč, a village and part of Těšovice (Prachatice District) in the South Bohemian Region
- Běleč nad Orlicí, a municipality and village in the Hradec Králové Region
- Charles Bélec (1872–1958), Canadian politician
- Vid Belec (born 1990), Slovenian footballer
- Saint-Bélec, a location near Leuhan, France, the eponym of the Saint-Bélec slab
