= Corfe (surname) =

Corfe is a surname, and may refer to:

- Arthur Corfe (1878–1949), New Zealand rugby union player
- Arthur Thomas Corfe (1773–1863), English organist and composer
- Charles Corfe (1843–1921), Bishop in Korea
- Charles Corfe (headmaster) (1847–1935), New Zealand cricketer and headmaster
- Joffa Corfe (born 1964), Australian rules football supporter
- Joseph Corfe (1740–1820), English organist and composer
- Melissa Corfe (born 1986), South African swimmer
