= Benjamin Blake (musician) =

Benjamin Blake (22 February 1751, in Hackney, London – 1827 in London) was an English violinist, viola player and composer.

== About ==
Most of what is known about him comes from information he supplied for Sainsbury's dictionary in 1824. As a boy he was taught the violin by Antonín Kammel, and later by Wilhelm Cramer, leader of the Italian Opera orchestra at the King's Theatre. Blake himself played the violin in this orchestra from about 1775, and also at the Concert of Ancient Music. He came into public prominence however as a viola player. He was principal and soloist at the Professional Concert from 1785 to 1793, appearing regularly in string quartets with Cramer. He also played the viola at the Prince of Wales's musical evenings, and his unusual interest in this instrument led to his publishing 18 duos for violin and viola in the 1780s. After the 1793 season Blake resigned from public performance. He was already studying the piano under Clementi to equip himself as a teacher, and though he continued to play the viola for the Prince of Wales he lived almost entirely by teaching until 1820 when he retired. Some of his duos merit revival, as also his sonatas for violin and piano, which were published in score and show an interesting taste for minor keys; the violin parts are called ‘accompaniments’ on the title page, but wrongly.

== Published works ==
- Op. 1 – Six Duets for a violin and tenor; printed for W. Napier, London (c.1780)
- Op. 2 – A Second Sett of 6 Duetts for a violin and tenor; published by J. Blundell, London (1781)
- Op. 3 – A Third Sett of 6 Duetts for a violin and tenor; printed for the author, London (1785)
- Op. 4 – Six sonatas for the piano forte with an accompaniment for a violin; printed for the author by Preston & Son (1794)
- Op. 5 – Nine Divertimentos, for the Piano Forte, with an Accompaniment for a violin ad libitum; published for the author by Birchall, London (1811)
- Op. 6 – A miscellaneous collection of vocal music, with a separate accompaniment for the harp or piano forte; composed and respectfully dedicated (by permission) to the Right Honble. the Countess of Bridgewater (1814)

1. The Indian Girl
2. A Supplication; words by Captain William Blake
3. A Touch at the Times
4. The Beggars Petition; words by Thomas Moss

- Op. 7 – A Duet for violin and tenor; published by Birchall, London (c.1820)
- Op. 9 – Three Solos for the tenor with an accompaniment for the violoncello (c.1825); with a note that they may also be played on a violin

'Tenor' in the titles of these publications refers to the tenor viola.

The only one of Blake's works currently available in modern form is Op. 2 available from Amadeus Music publishers. Copies of the other works can be obtained from the British Library and various other large or specialist music libraries.

== Mention of Benjamin Blake in "talking about Muzio Clementi" ==
1791-1802 : From 1791 to 1793 Muzio Clementi's position as a composer suffered greatly from the presence of Haydn in London. Only after Haydn's return to Vienna in 1793 did Clementi once again fully resume his activities, even as an orchestral conductor. During these years he is known to have composed three new symphonies.

When Haydn returned to London in 1794-5, Clementi's celebrity was once again eclipsed. In the meantime, however, the number of his private pupils grew: apart from Cramer and others, they included John Field, Benoît-Auguste Bertini, Miss Parke, Arthur Thomas Corfe, Benjamin Blake, Mme. Bartolozzi and Miss Theresa Jansen. He became a much sought-after teacher, giving regular lessons to a number of pupils.
