= Benjamin Blake =

Benjamin Blake may refer to:

- Benjamin Blake (musician) (1751–1827), English violinist, viola player and composer
- Benjamin Blake (admiral) (1612–1689), English naval officer and planter
- Benjamin Blake, a 1941 historical novel by Edison Marshall
  - Son of Fury: The Story of Benjamin Blake, a 1942 film adaptation

== See also ==
- Benjamin Blake Minor (1818–1905), American writer, legal scholar, and president of the University of Missouri
