= Antonín Kammel =

Bohemian composer and violinist

Antonín Kammel (Note: Also known as Anthony Kammel) (21 April 1730 – 5 October 1784) was a Bohemian composer and violinist of the Classical period. He is known for his instrumental works composed primarily for strings, though he did compose a few sinfonias and divertimentos that included wind instruments. His music incorporates many features of other Classical period works as well as elements reminiscent of Czech folk music.

== Life ==
Antonín Kammel was born in Běleč, in what is now the Czech Republic, on 21 April 1730. Kammel's father worked as a forester on the estate of Count Vincent Ferrerus Waldstein and it was from him that Kammel gained his knowledge of forestry and likely came into contact with Count Waldstein.

Kammel studied music at the Patres Piares College, Slaný from 1746 to 1751 and an unconfirmed subject, thought to be philosophy, at Prague University from 1751 to 1753. It is unknown when Kammel came into the employment of Count Waldstein, but at an unknown date in the late 1750s (based on letters from Kammel to Waldstein), Waldstein sent Kammel to Padua, Italy to study the violin under the tutelage of Giuseppe Tartini. After studying in Italy, Kammel returned to the Waldstein estate for a few years, during which he gave performances and violin lessons.

In early 1765, Kammel traveled to London, England, where he continued to give performances and worked as a salesman, selling wood for ships' masts on Count Waldstein's behalf.

While in England, Kammel published several of his own compositions and gave performances alongside other leading composers and musicians of the time. He frequently performed and published with both Johann Christian Bach and Carl Friedrich Abel, based on concert programs from the time and joint publications such as the music seller Johann Julius Hummel's 1778 publication of a collection of six trios for two violins and violoncello by the three composers. In 2021, a painting attributed to Thomas Gainsborough was identified as of Antonín Kammel.

On 20 January 1768, Kammel was married to Ann Edicatt and between 1770 and 1779 they had six children together.

Antonín Kammel died on 5 October 1784.

== Works ==
A full list of Antonín Kammel's works can be found at Oxford Music Online and the International Music Score Library Project (see External links below).
