= Jenčov Castle =

- hrad Jenčov
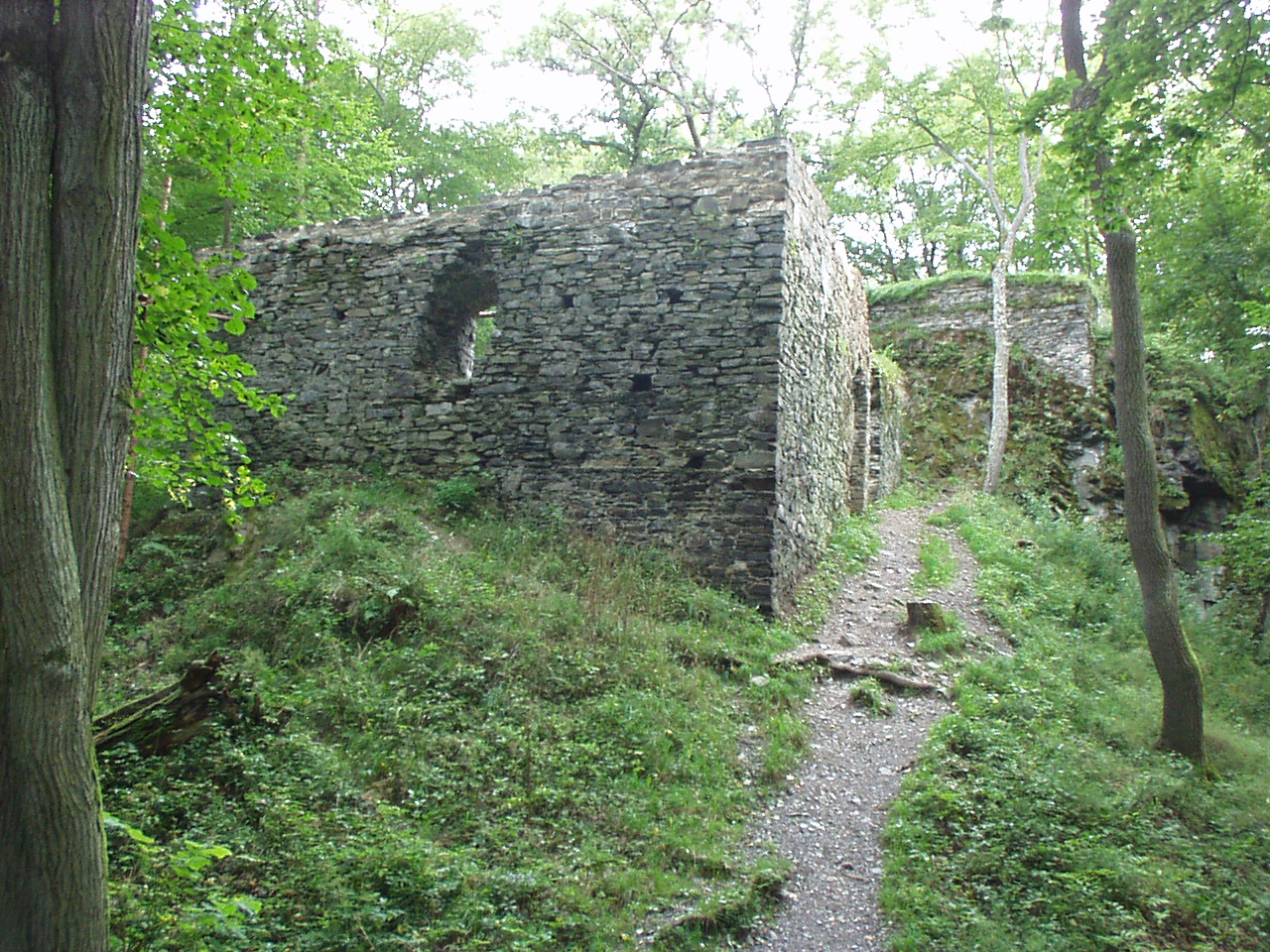
- View of the castle entrance path and tower foundations

- Location within Czech Republic
- Alternative names: Jinčov Castle

General information
- Type: Medieval castle
- Architectural style: Gothic architecture
- Location: Běleč, Central Bohemian Region, Czech Republic, Czech Republic
- Coordinates: 50°2′10.6″N 13°59′11.6″E
- Elevation: 340 m (1,115 ft)
- Owner: State of Czech Republic

Jenčov Castle (Czech: hrad Jenčov), also known as Jinčov Castle, is a castle ruin in the municipality of Běleč in the Central Bohemian Region of the Czech Republic. It is protected as a cultural monument of the Czech Republic.

== Location ==
Jenčov is located in the municipal territory of Běleč, 2 km (1.2 mi) south of the village, and about 25 km (16 mi) west of Prague. It is situated at an altitude of 340 m (1,120 ft) above sea level in the Vůznice National Nature Reserve within the Křivoklátsko Protected Landscape Area.

== History ==
Jenčov is one of the smallest castles in the Czech Republic, which likely served as a hunting castle. The exact date when the foundation of the castle was established is unknown. Research confirmed its existence at the turn of the 13th and 14th centuries and was likely founded by Ottokar II of Bohemia.

Jenčov was the smallest royal castle in the kingdom. Due to the distance to the nearest villages, the ruin of the castle was not dismantled into building material and has been preserved.

== Gallery ==
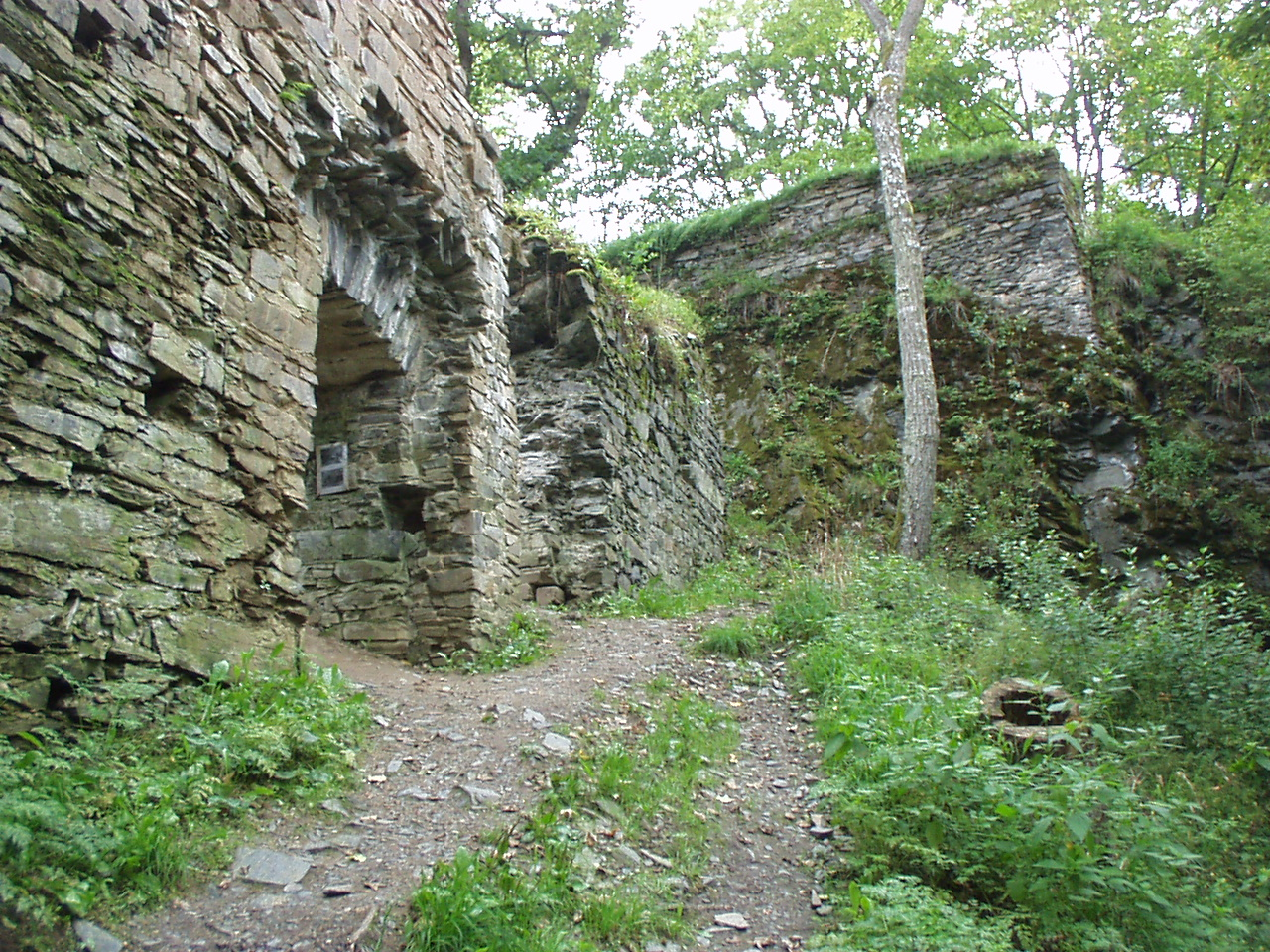
View of the castle gates and tower foundations

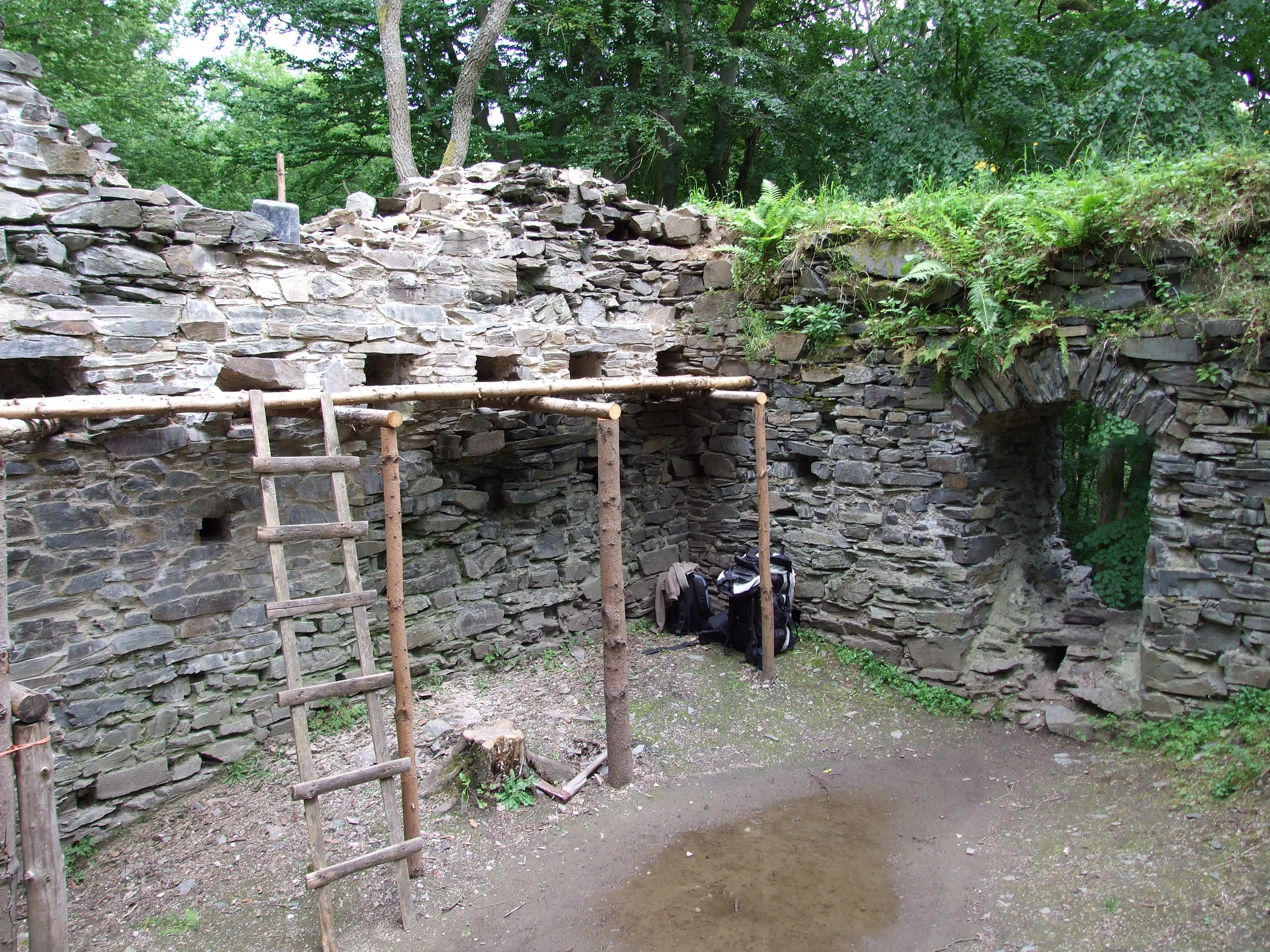
Reconstruction of the castle

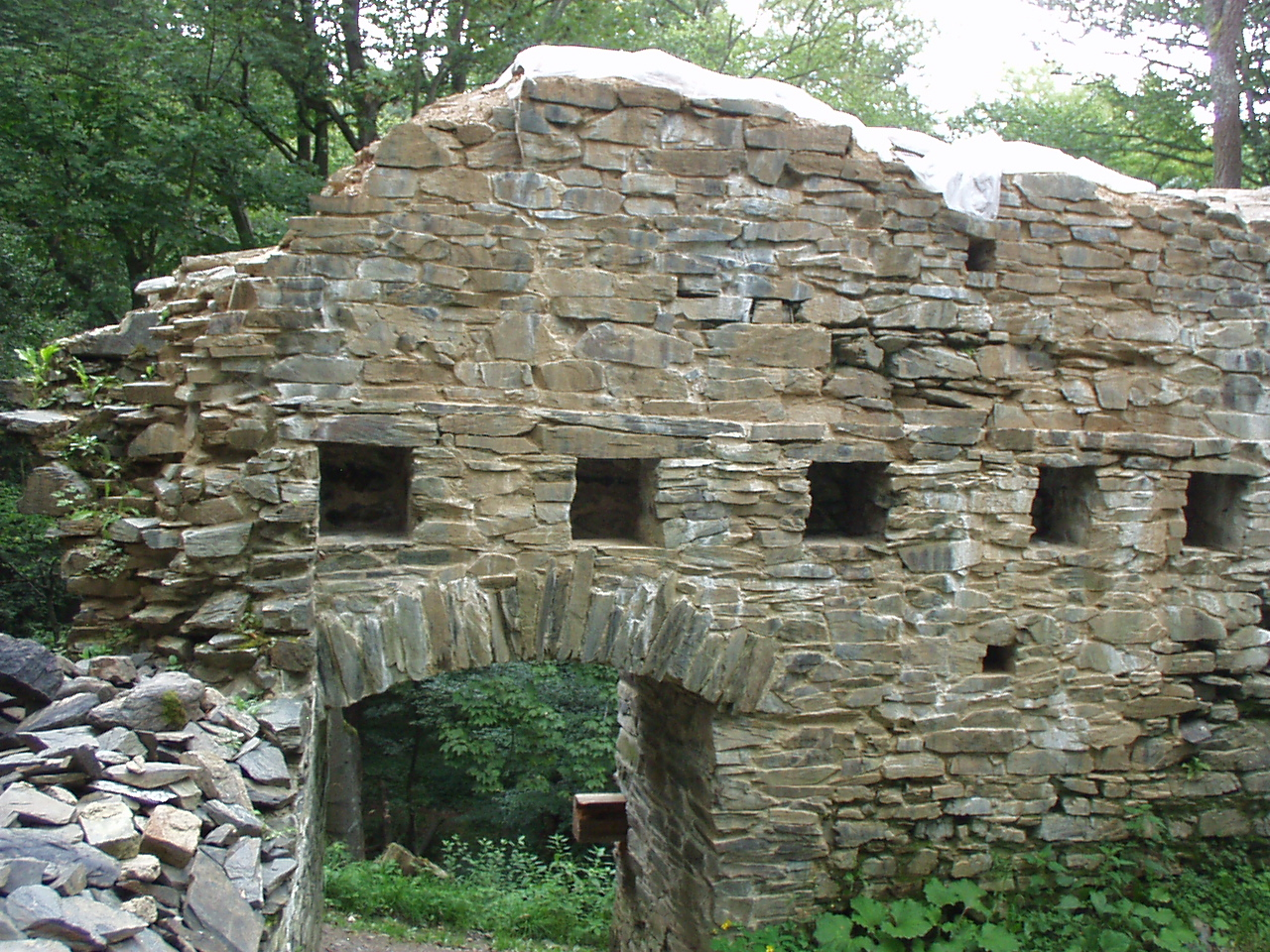
The ceiling beam on the first floor of the castle

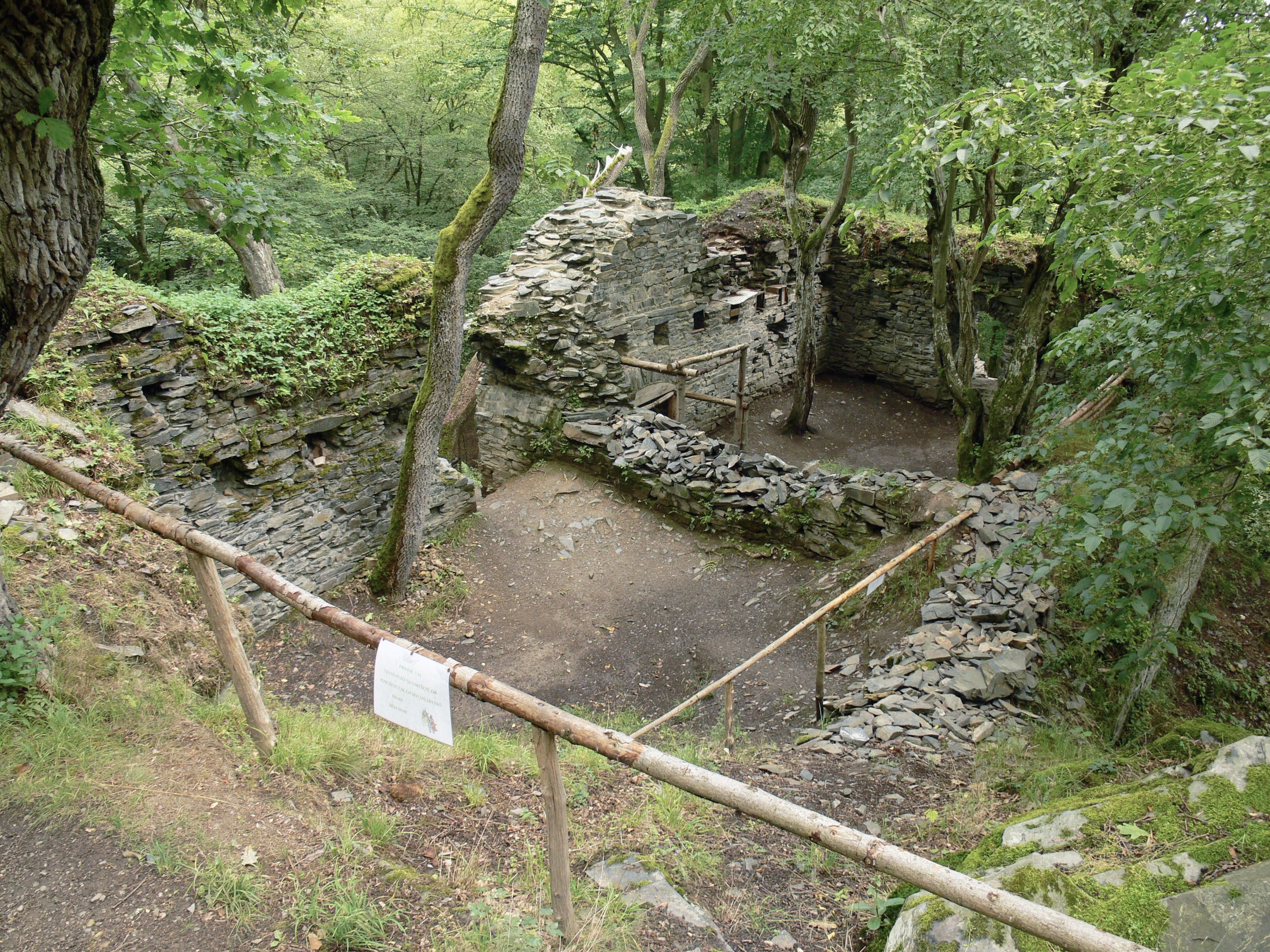
Castle view from the tower

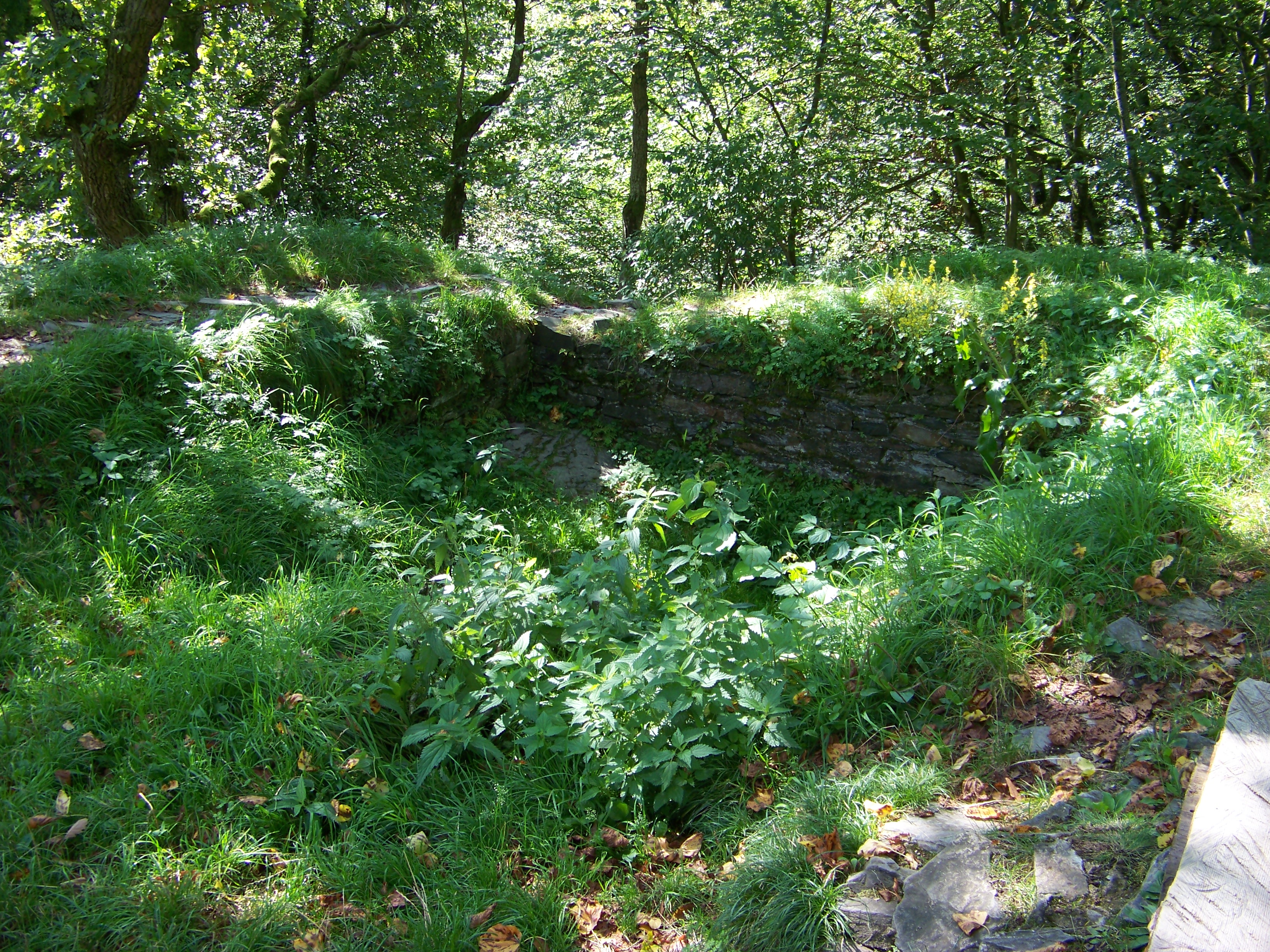
The tower base

== See also ==
- List of castles in the Czech Republic
- History of the Czech lands in the Middle Ages
