= Joseph Corfe =

English singer and organist

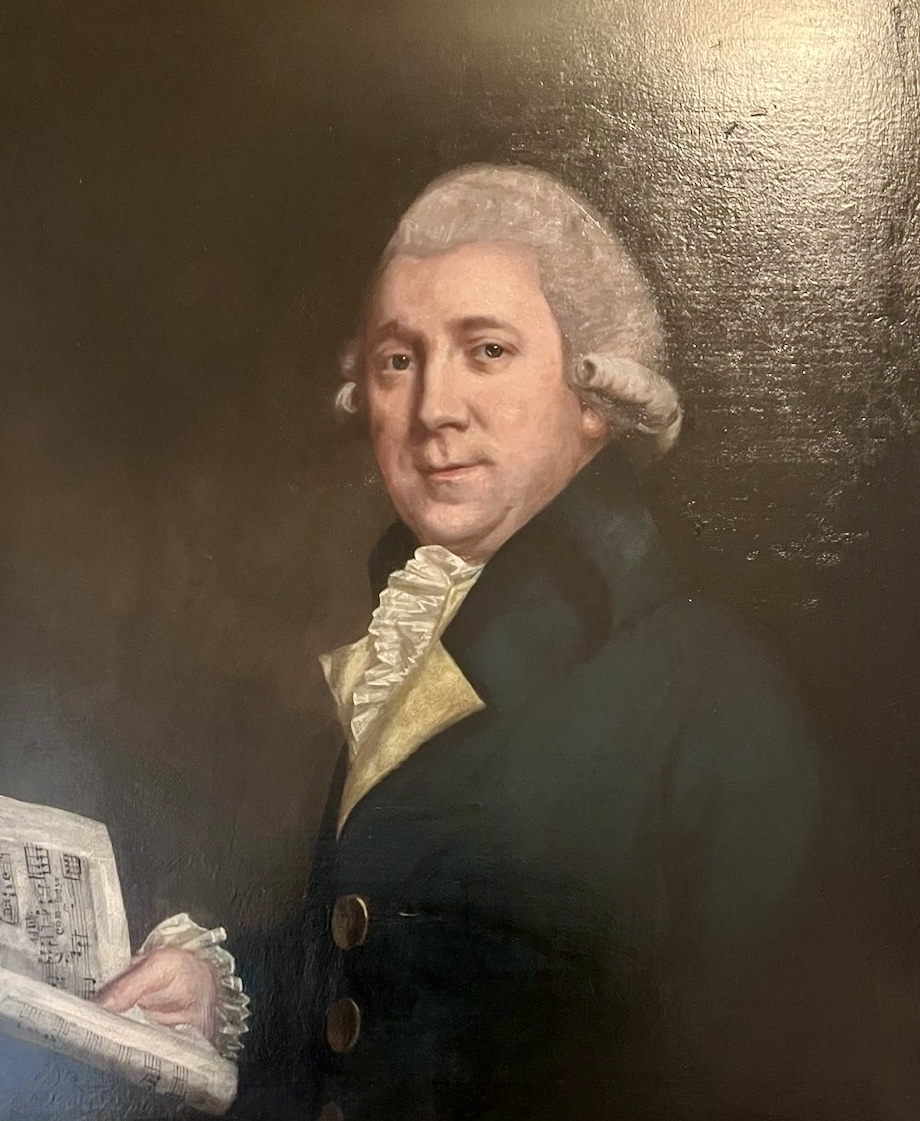
- Portrait of Joseph Corfe, maybe by artist Thomas Beach
- Born: 9 February 1741
- Died: 29 July 1820 (aged 79); Salisbury, England
- Burial place: Salisbury Cathedral
- Occupations: Singer, organist, composer
- Era: Classical
- Spouse: Mary Bernard (m. 1766)
- Children: 9, including Arthur
- Relatives: Charles Corfe (great grandson)

Joseph Corfe (9 February 1741 – 29 July 1820) was an English Church singer, organist, and composer.

== Life ==
Born into a musical family from Salisbury, Joseph was an English organist and tenor, son of Joseph Corfe (b 1705). He was descended from Robert Corfe, a bellringer at Winchester Cathedral from 1669 to 1706. He was a chorister at Salisbury Cathedral, 1752–3, lay vicar, 1759–60, and was apprenticed to the cathedral organist John Stephens. Stephens was the organist at Salisbury Cathedral from 1746 until his death in 1781.

Both Joseph Corfe and Robert Parry were considered to succeed Stephens, with Parry eventually being given the position. Composer and diarist, John Marsh (1752 – 1828) wrote how acrimonious this period was, and how it divided the musical community. Joseph Corfe finally became the organist in 1792.

He was made a Gentleman of the Chapel Royal in 1783 and in 1784 sang at the Handel Commemoration. Joseph was a respected singing teacher with Nancy Storace and Mrs Second among his pupils.

In November 1804 Corfe resigned his post as organist of Salisbury Cathedral in favour of his eldest surviving son, Arthur Thomas Corfe (1773 - 1863), a pupil of Benjamin Cooke and Muzio Clementi.

He lived with his family in The Close, Salisbury, and died at his home in 1820 and was buried in the north-west transept of the cathedral.

== Works ==
His published works include A Treatise on Singing (1799), Sacred Music (1800), The Beauties of Handel (1803), Beauties of Purcell (c1805), Thorough Bass Simplified (1805) and Church Music (c1810), as well as glees, songs and anthems.

== Family ==
In 1766 Joseph married Mary Bernard; they had nine children. Their son Arthur Thomas Corfe took over as organist of Salisbury Cathedral in 1804. Another son, John, (b. 1769) had been a singer, cellist, and double bass player in the Drury Lane orchestra.

Their grandson(s), John Davies Corfe (1804–1876) was the organist for Bristol Cathedral for over 50 years and Charles William Corfe took the Mus.Doc (Oxon 1852), and was organist of Christ Church, Oxford, from 1846. A photographic portrait taken by Lewis Carroll circa 1860 can be seen in the National Portrait Gallery.

Their great grandson, Charles John Corfe (b.1843) was a naval chaplain, became the Bishop of Korea, and later the chaplain to the Duke of Edinburgh.
