= Běleč (Tábor District) =

- Municipality
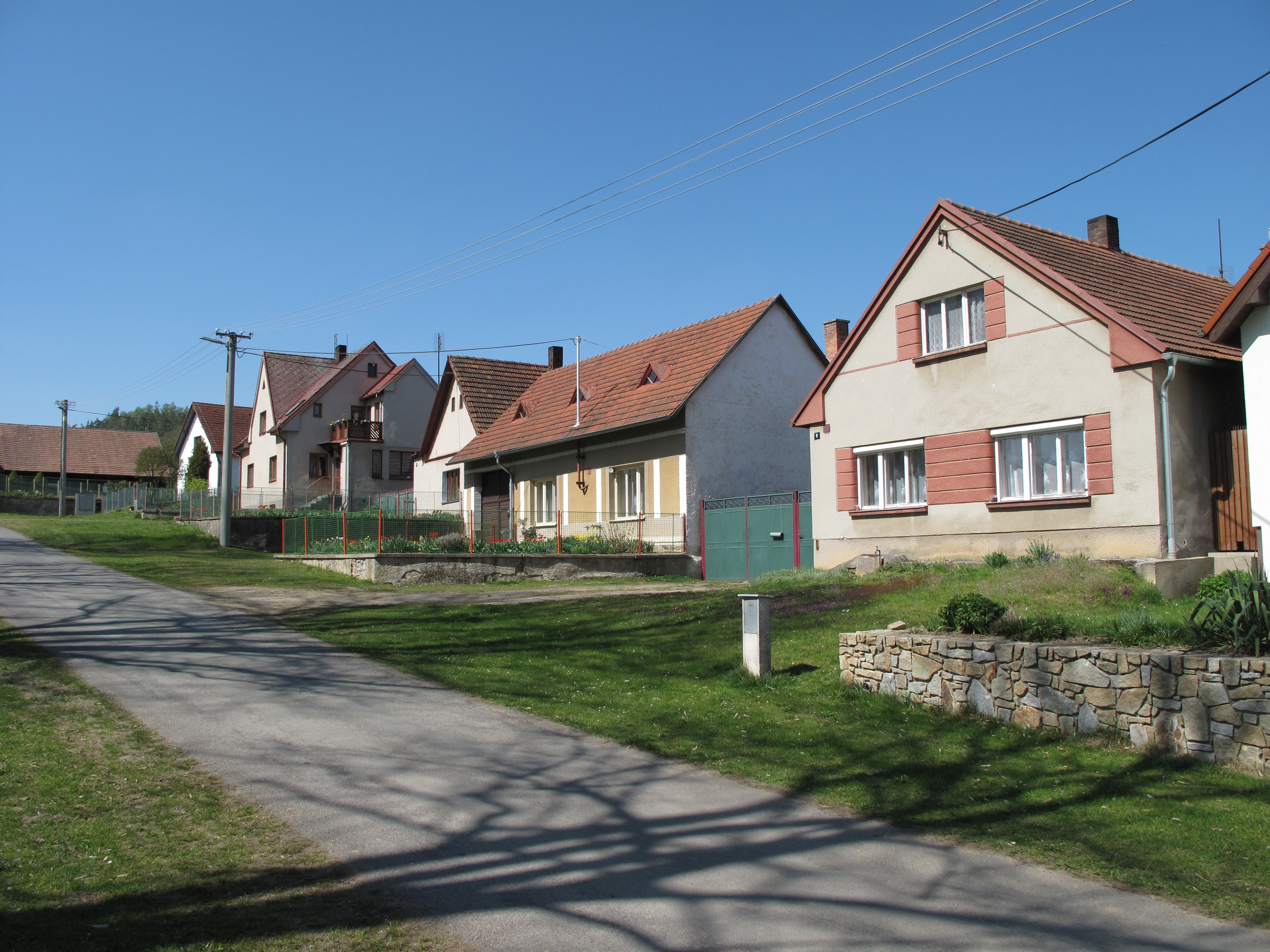
- Centre of Běleč

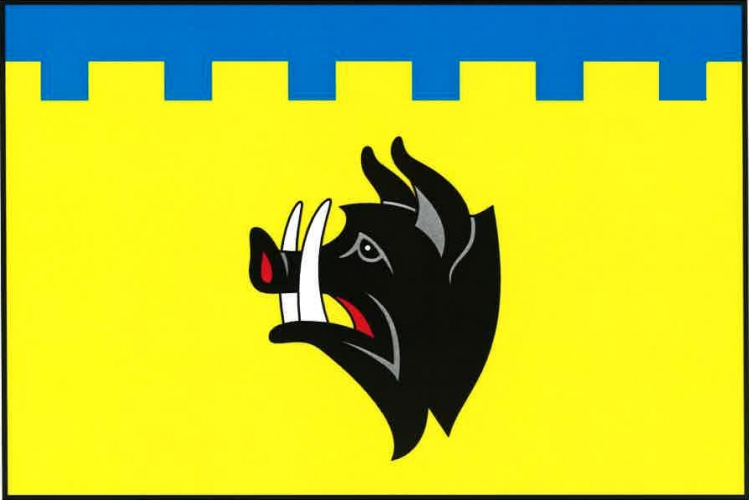
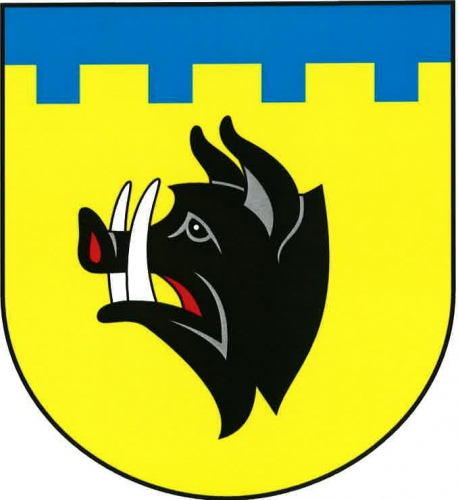
- Flag Coat of arms

- Location in the Czech Republic
- Coordinates: 49°32′27″N 14°50′14″E
- Country: Czech Republic
- Region: South Bohemian
- District: Tábor
- First mentioned: 1375

Area
  - Total: 12.23 km^{2} (4.72 sq mi)
- Elevation: 457 m (1,499 ft)

Population (2026-01-01)
  - Total: 197
  - Density: 16.1/km^{2} (41.7/sq mi)
- Time zone: UTC+1 (CET)
  - Summer (DST): UTC+2 (CEST)
- Postal code: 391 43
- Website: www.obecbelec.cz

Běleč is a municipality and village in Tábor District in the South Bohemian Region of the Czech Republic. It has about 200 inhabitants.

== Administrative division ==
Běleč consists of three municipal parts (in brackets population according to the 2021 census):

- Běleč (116)
- Bzová (71)
- Elbančice (7)

== Etymology ==
The name Běleč is derived from the personal name Bělec, meaning "Bělec's (court)".

== Geography ==
Běleč is located about 18 kilometres (11 mi) northeast of Tábor and 67 km (42 mi) northeast of České Budějovice. It lies in the Vlašim Uplands. The highest point is at 673 m (2,208 ft) above sea level. The Blanice River flows along the western municipal border.

== History ==
The first written mention of Běleč is from 1375. History of the village is connected with the Šelmberk Castle, which was founded here at the beginning of the 14th century.

== Demographics ==
Historical population

| Year | Pop. | ±% |
|---|---|---|
| 1869 | 559 | — |
| 1880 | 569 | +1.8% |
| 1890 | 489 | −14.1% |
| 1900 | 468 | −4.3% |
| 1910 | 450 | −3.8% |

| Year | Pop. | ±% |
|---|---|---|
| 1921 | 457 | +1.6% |
| 1930 | 400 | −12.5% |
| 1950 | 287 | −28.2% |
| 1961 | 279 | −2.8% |
| 1970 | 253 | −9.3% |

| Year | Pop. | ±% |
|---|---|---|
| 1980 | 230 | −9.1% |
| 1991 | 183 | −20.4% |
| 2001 | 187 | +2.2% |
| 2011 | 168 | −10.2% |
| 2021 | 194 | +15.5% |

Source: Censuses

== Transport ==
There are no railways or major roads passing through the municipality.

== Sights ==
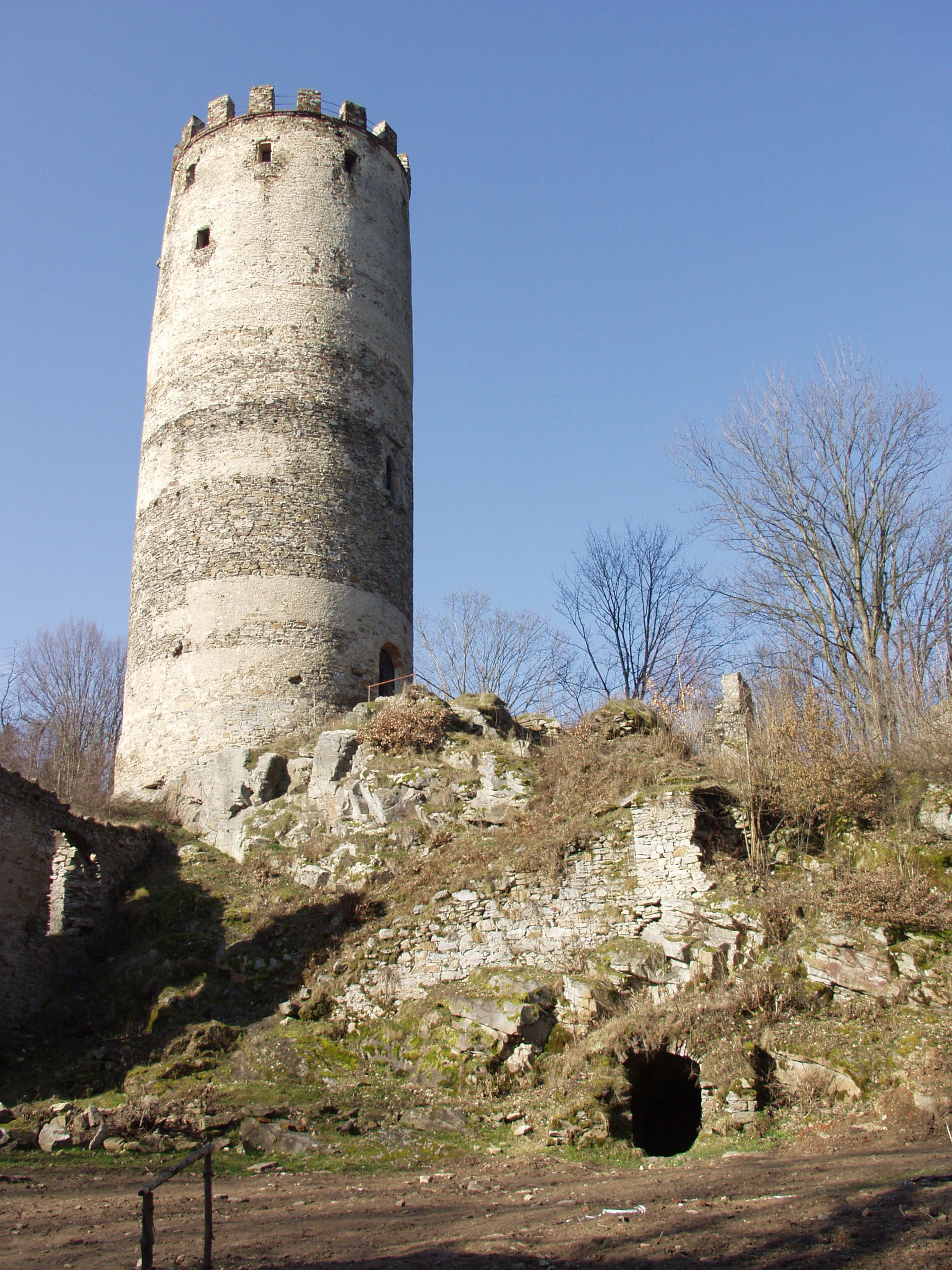
Šelmberk Castle

The most important monument is the ruin of the Šelmberk Castle. The castle was founded before 1318. In the 16th century, it was rebuilt in the Renaissance style. At the end of the 16th century, it lost its residential function, and fell into disrepair during the 17th century. The main preserved element is the 26 m (85 ft) high bergfried.
