= Běleč (Brno-Country District) =

- Municipality
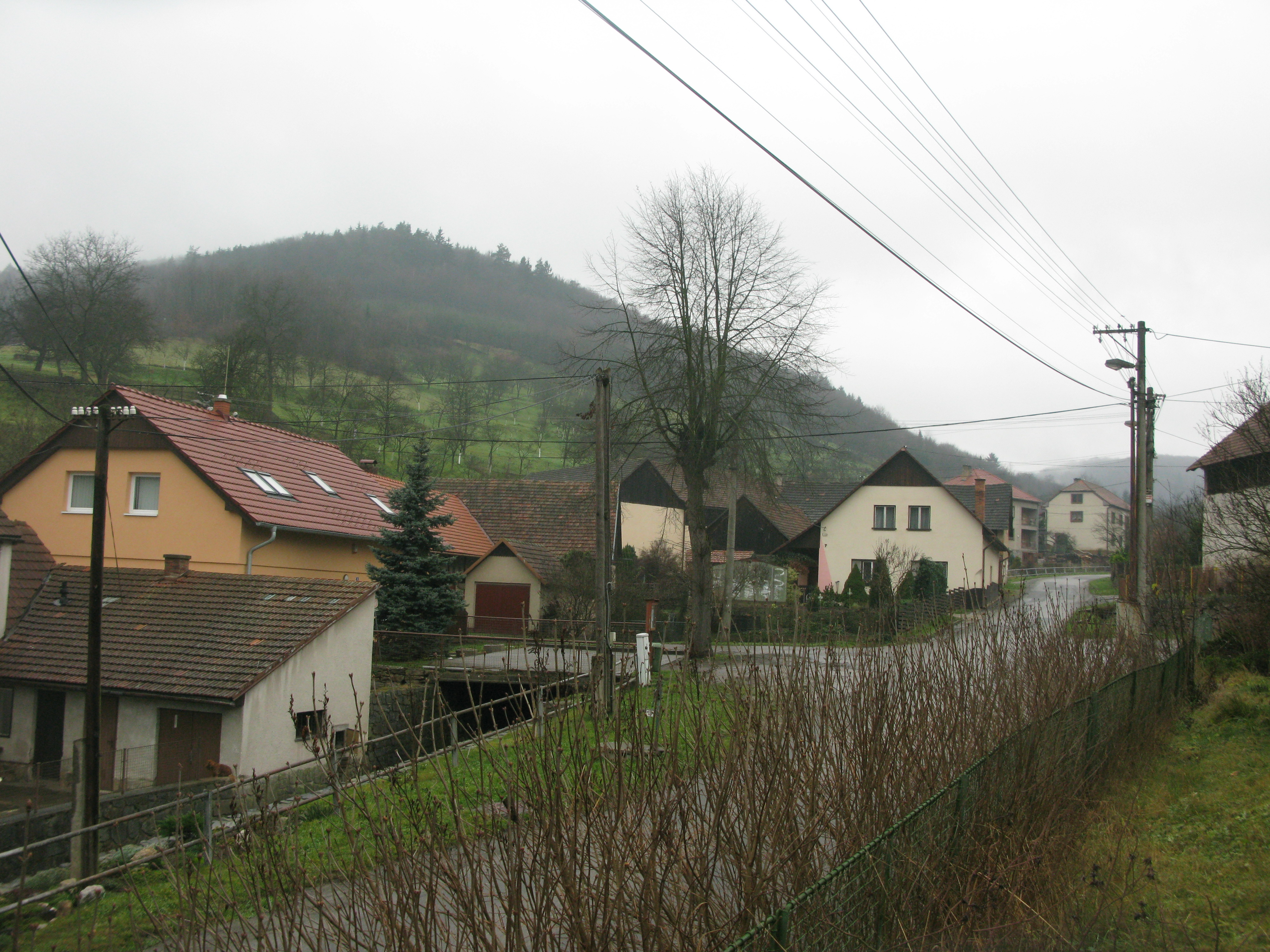
- Centre of Běleč

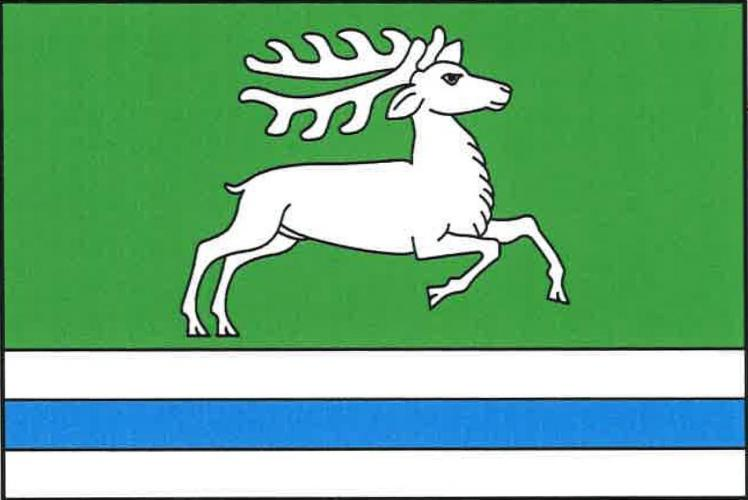
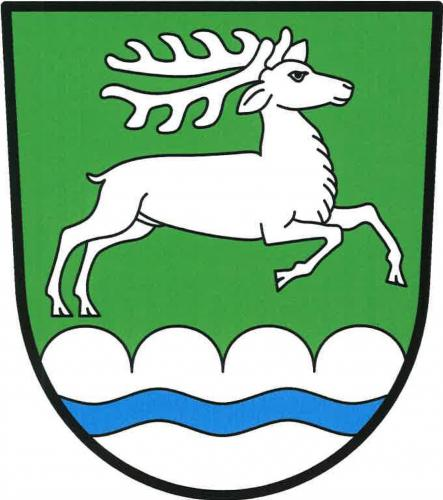
- Flag Coat of arms

- Location in the Czech Republic
- Coordinates: 49°26′2″N 16°22′59″E
- Country: Czech Republic
- Region: South Moravian
- District: Brno-Country
- First mentioned: 1447

Area
  - Total: 4.03 km^{2} (1.56 sq mi)
- Elevation: 406 m (1,332 ft)

Population (2026-01-01)
  - Total: 181
  - Density: 44.9/km^{2} (116/sq mi)
- Time zone: UTC+1 (CET)
  - Summer (DST): UTC+2 (CEST)
- Postal code: 679 23
- Website: www.belec-kreptov.cz

Běleč is a municipality and village in Brno-Country District in the South Moravian Region of the Czech Republic. It has about 200 inhabitants.

Běleč lies approximately 31 kilometres (19 mi) north-west of Brno and 159 km (99 mi) south-east of Prague.

== Administrative division ==
Běleč consists of two municipal parts (in brackets population according to the 2021 census):

- Běleč (137)
- Křeptov (54)

== Demographics ==
Historical population
Year	Pop.	±%
1869	190	—
1880	247	+30.0%
1890	232	−6.1%
1900	237	+2.2%
1910	264	+11.4%
1921	286	+8.3%
1930	276	−3.5%
1950	309	+12.0%
1961	323	+4.5%
1970	277	−14.2%
1980	249	−10.1%
1991	218	−12.4%
2001	194	−11.0%
2011	186	−4.1%
2021	191	+2.7%
Source: Censuses
