= Těšovice (Prachatice District) =

- Municipality
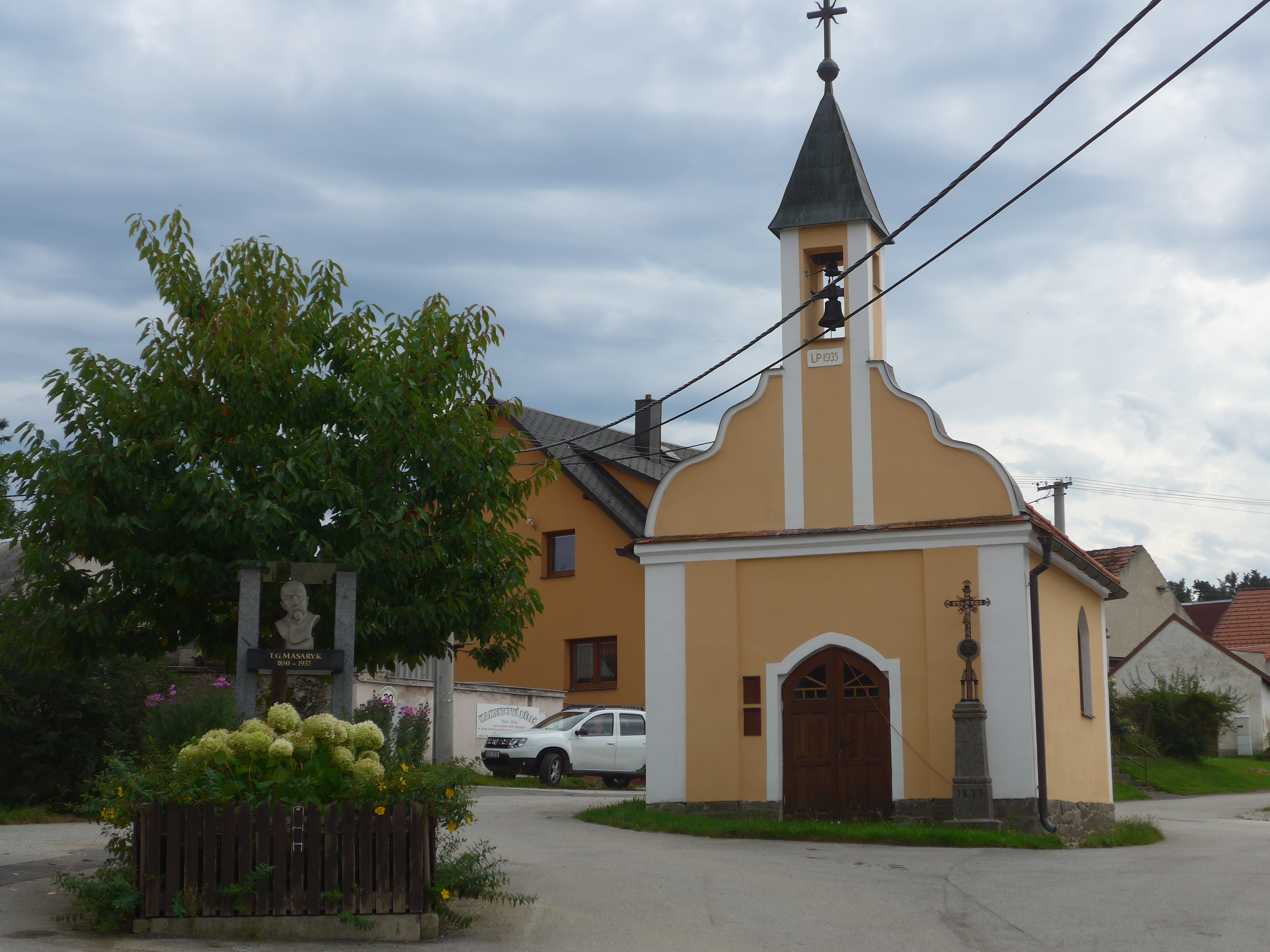
- Běleč, a part of Těšovice

- Location in the Czech Republic
- Coordinates: 49°3′26″N 14°1′26″E
- Country: Czech Republic
- Region: South Bohemian
- District: Prachatice
- First mentioned: 1356

Area
  - Total: 8.37 km^{2} (3.23 sq mi)
- Elevation: 501 m (1,644 ft)

Population (2026-01-01)
  - Total: 336
  - Density: 40.1/km^{2} (104/sq mi)
- Time zone: UTC+1 (CET)
  - Summer (DST): UTC+2 (CEST)
- Postal code: 384 21
- Website: www.obec-tesovice.cz

Těšovice is a municipality and village in Prachatice District in the South Bohemian Region of the Czech Republic. It has about 300 inhabitants.

Těšovice lies approximately 5 kilometres (3 mi) north of Prachatice, 35 km (22 mi) west of České Budějovice, and 119 km (74 mi) south of Prague.

== Administrative division ==
Těšovice consists of three municipal parts (in brackets population according to the 2021 census):

- Těšovice (130)
- Běleč (116)
- Bělečská Lhota (43)

== Demographics ==
Historical population
Year	Pop.	±%
1869	612	—
1880	636	+3.9%
1890	564	−11.3%
1900	526	−6.7%
1910	567	+7.8%
1921	602	+6.2%
1930	537	−10.8%
1950	381	−29.1%
1961	353	−7.3%
1970	313	−11.3%
1980	323	+3.2%
1991	279	−13.6%
2001	268	−3.9%
2011	282	+5.2%
2021	289	+2.5%
Source: Censuses
