= Arthur Thomas Corfe =

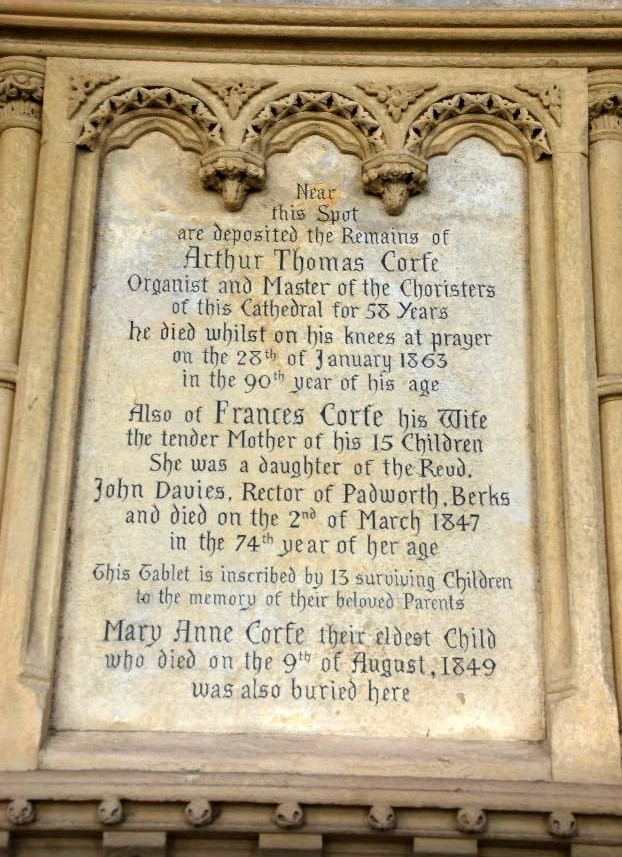
Arthur Thomas Corfe’s Family Tomb, Salisbury Cathedral

Arthur Thomas Corfe (9 April 1773 – 28 January 1863) was an English organist, composer, and Master of Choristers of Salisbury Cathedral for fifty eight years.

== Life ==
Corfe was born in Salisbury in 1773, the third son of Joseph Corfe, organist of Salisbury Cathedral. In 1783 he became a chorister of Westminster Abbey under Benjamin Cooke, and for some time studied the piano under Muzio Clementi. In 1804 he succeeded his father as organist of the cathedral, and in 1813 The Gentleman's Magazine reported that he had got the choir into a state of remarkable perfection.

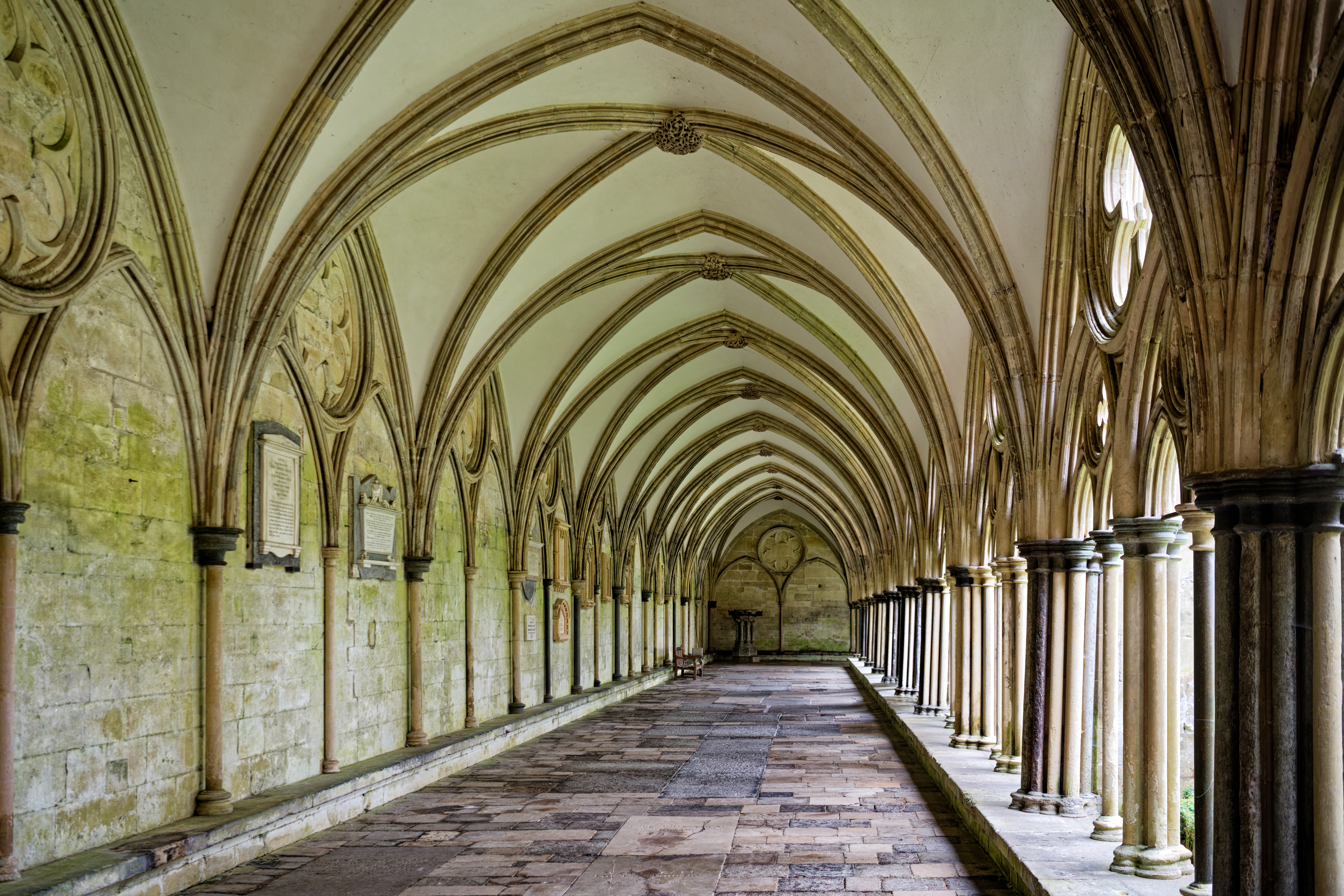
Cloister of Salisbury Cathedral

In 1828 he organised a successful festival at Salisbury, which took place from 19 to 22 August of that year. He conducted the whole of the performances, and his son John Davis Corfe played the organ. Among the solo singers were Mary Ann Paton, Rosalbina Caradori-Allan, and John Braham.

Towards the end of his life his health showed signs of failing, but he attended the daily service regularly until the end. On 28 January 1863 he was found in the morning dead at his home, kneeling by his bedside as if in prayer. He was buried in the cloisters of the cathedral.

== Family ==
In 1796 Arthur married Frances, daughter of J. Davies, vicar of Padworth, Berkshire, and they had fifteen children. Several of his sons were choristers at Magdalen College, Oxford. His eldest son, John Davis (1804–1876), was organist of Bristol Cathedral for more than fifty years. His fourth son, George, became resident medical officer at the Middlesex Hospital, and wrote several medical treatises. His younger son, Charles William (1814–1883), took the degree of Mus. Doc. at Oxford in 1852, and was organist of Christ Church, Oxford from 1846 to his retirement shortly before his death. He was appointed choragus to the university in 1860, and published several glees, part-songs, anthems and other works. A photographic portrait taken by Lewis Carroll circa 1860 can be seen in the National Portrait Gallery.

== Works ==
Arthur Thomas Corfe wrote a service and a few anthems, and some piano pieces. He published various arrangements, and a book The Principles of Harmony and Thorough-bass.
