= Běleč nad Orlicí =

- Municipality
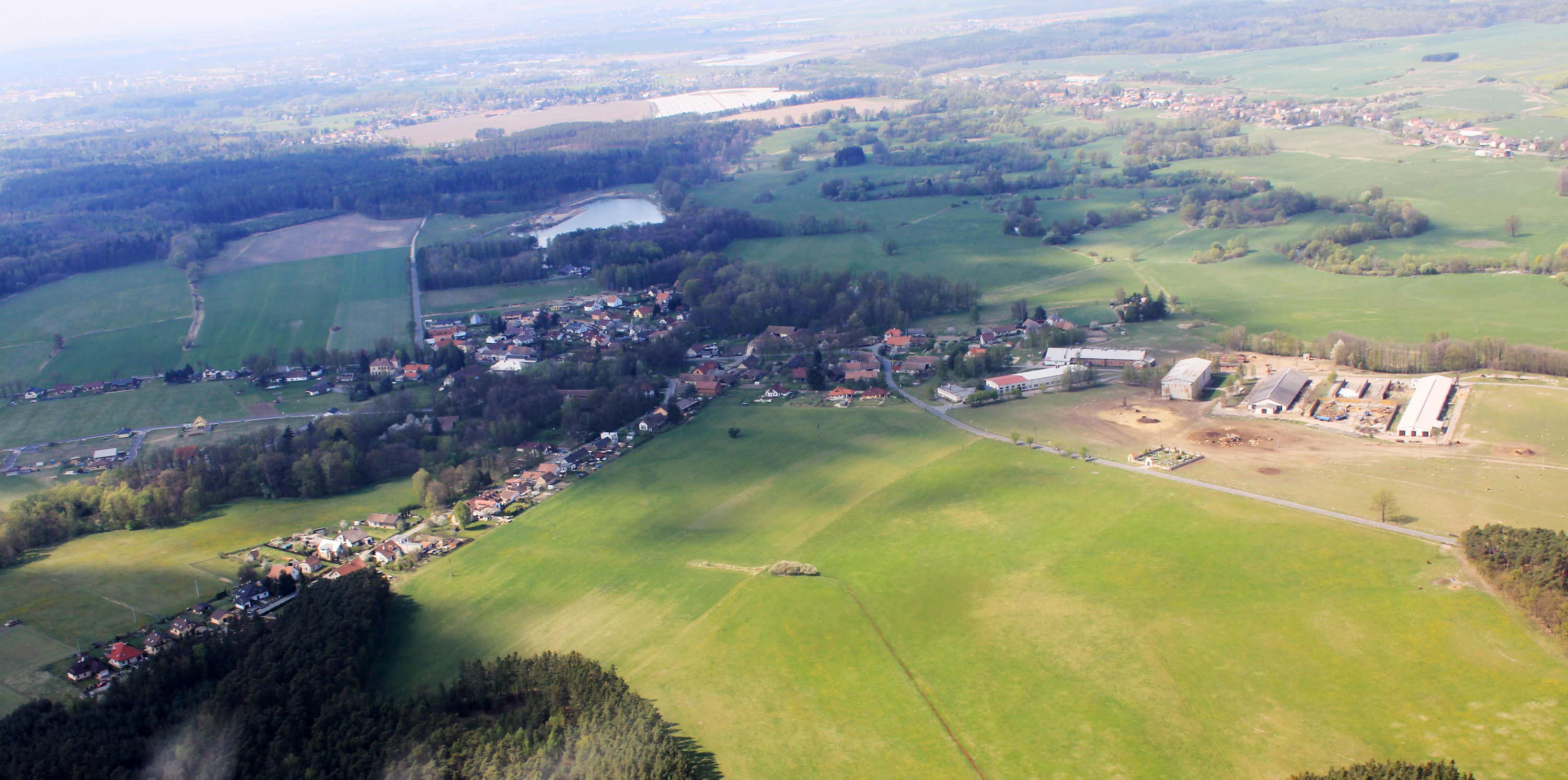
- Aerial view

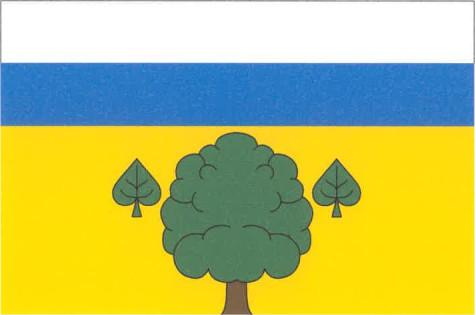
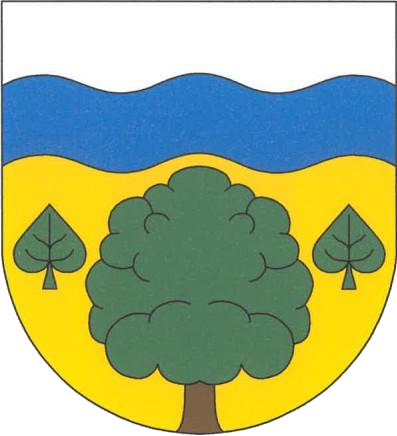
- Flag Coat of arms

- Location in the Czech Republic
- Coordinates: 50°11′53″N 15°56′34″E
- Country: Czech Republic
- Region: Hradec Králové
- District: Hradec Králové
- First mentioned: 1336

Area
  - Total: 18.82 km^{2} (7.27 sq mi)
- Elevation: 240 m (790 ft)

Population (2026-01-01)
  - Total: 414
  - Density: 22.0/km^{2} (57.0/sq mi)
- Time zone: UTC+1 (CET)
  - Summer (DST): UTC+2 (CEST)
- Postal code: 503 46
- Website: belec.trebechovicko.cz

Běleč nad Orlicí is a municipality and village in Hradec Králové District in the Hradec Králové Region of the Czech Republic. It has about 400 inhabitants.

== Etymology ==
The name Běleč is derived from the personal name Bělec, meaning "Bělec's (court)".

== Demographics ==
Historical population
Year	Pop.	±%
1869	353	—
1880	399	+13.0%
1890	361	−9.5%
1900	357	−1.1%
1910	340	−4.8%
1921	325	−4.4%
1930	294	−9.5%
1950	239	−18.7%
1961	245	+2.5%
1970	215	−12.2%
1980	196	−8.8%
1991	183	−6.6%
2001	215	+17.5%
2011	319	+48.4%
2021	413	+29.5%
Source: Censuses
