= Běleč (Kladno District) =

- Municipality
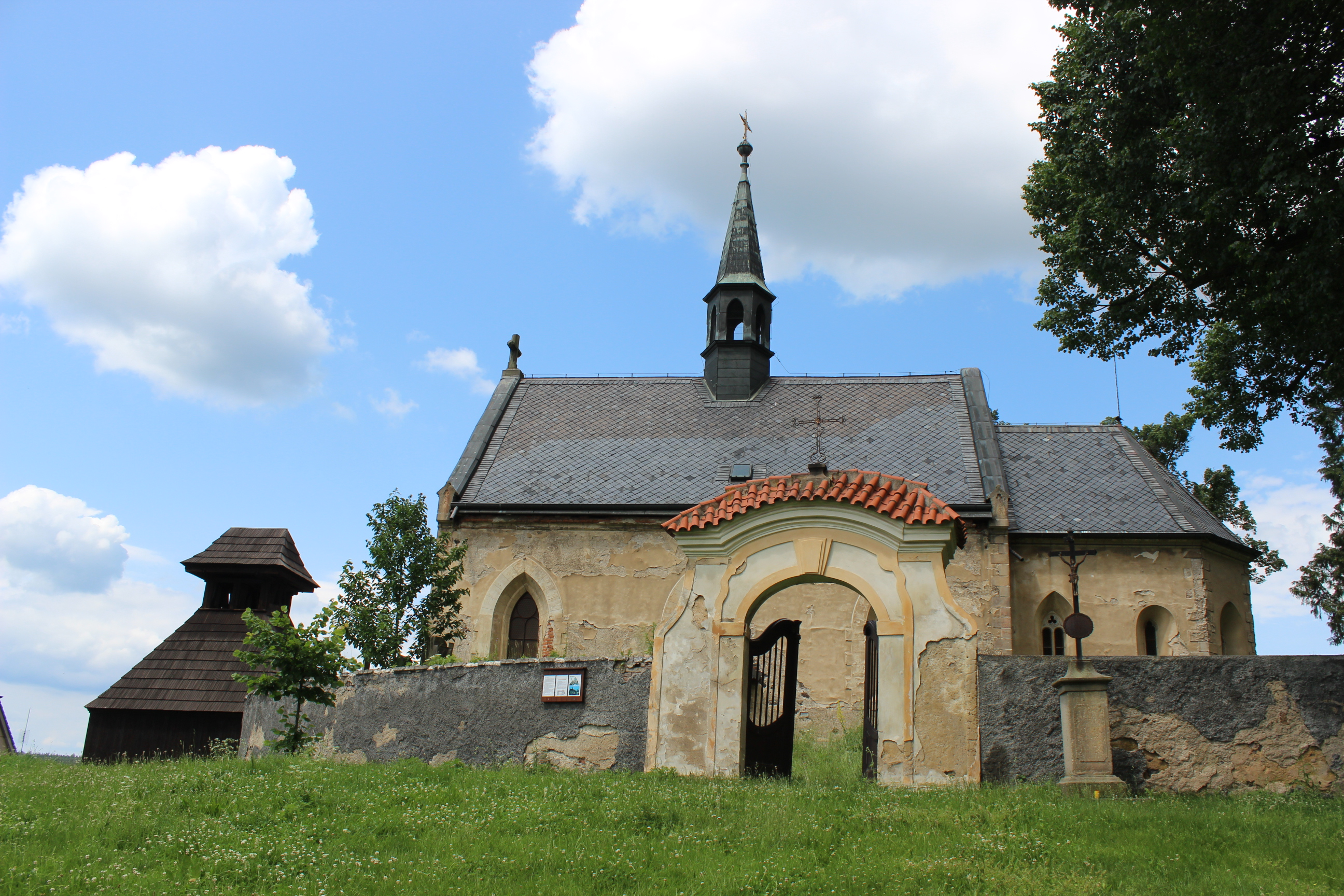
- Church of Saint Nicholas

- Flag Coat of arms

- Location in the Czech Republic
- Coordinates: 50°3′23″N 13°59′35″E
- Country: Czech Republic
- Region: Central Bohemian
- District: Kladno
- First mentioned: 1352

Area
  - Total: 18.47 km^{2} (7.13 sq mi)
- Elevation: 526 m (1,726 ft)

Population (2026-01-01)
  - Total: 326
  - Density: 17.7/km^{2} (45.7/sq mi)
- Time zone: UTC+1 (CET)
  - Summer (DST): UTC+2 (CEST)
- Postal code: 273 63
- Website: www.belec.cz

Běleč is a municipality and village in Kladno District in the Central Bohemian Region of the Czech Republic. It has about 300 inhabitants.

== Etymology ==
The name is derived from the personal name Bělec, meaning "Bělec's (court)".

== Geography ==
Běleč is located about 12 kilometres (7 mi) southwest of Kladno and 23 km (14 mi) west of Prague. It lies in the Křivoklát Highlands. The highest point is the hill Krchůvek at 472 m (1,549 ft) above sea level. The Vůznice Stream originates here and flows across the municipality. Běleč entirely lies in the Křivoklátsko Protected Landscape Area. Part of the Vůznice National Nature Reserve is also situated in Běleč's territory.

== History ==
The first written mention of Běleč is from 1352.

== Demographics ==
Historical population

Year	Pop.	±%
1869	497	—
1880	526	+5.8%
1890	531	+1.0%
1900	476	−10.4%
1910	493	+3.6%

Year	Pop.	±%
1921	482	−2.2%
1930	540	+12.0%
1950	369	−31.7%
1961	373	+1.1%
1970	349	−6.4%

Year	Pop.	±%
1980	346	−0.9%
1991	330	−4.6%
2001	293	−11.2%
2011	336	+14.7%
2021	304	−9.5%

Source: Censuses

== Transport ==
There are no railways or major roads passing through the municipality.

== Sights ==
The main landmark of Běleč is the Church of Saint Nicholas. It was built in the Gothic style in the 14th century and rebuilt to its current appearance in 1903–1904. The church is surrounded by a cemetery and next to the cemetery stand a wooden bell tower from 1717.

Jenčov Castle is a castle ruin located in the woods south of the village. It is freely accessible.
