= Chvalovice =

Chvalovice may refer to places in the Czech Republic:

- Chvalovice (Prachatice District), a municipality and village in the South Bohemian Region
- Chvalovice (Znojmo District), a municipality and village in the South Moravian Region
- Chvalovice, a village and part of Kovanice in the Central Bohemian Region
