= Babice (Prachatice District) =

- Municipality
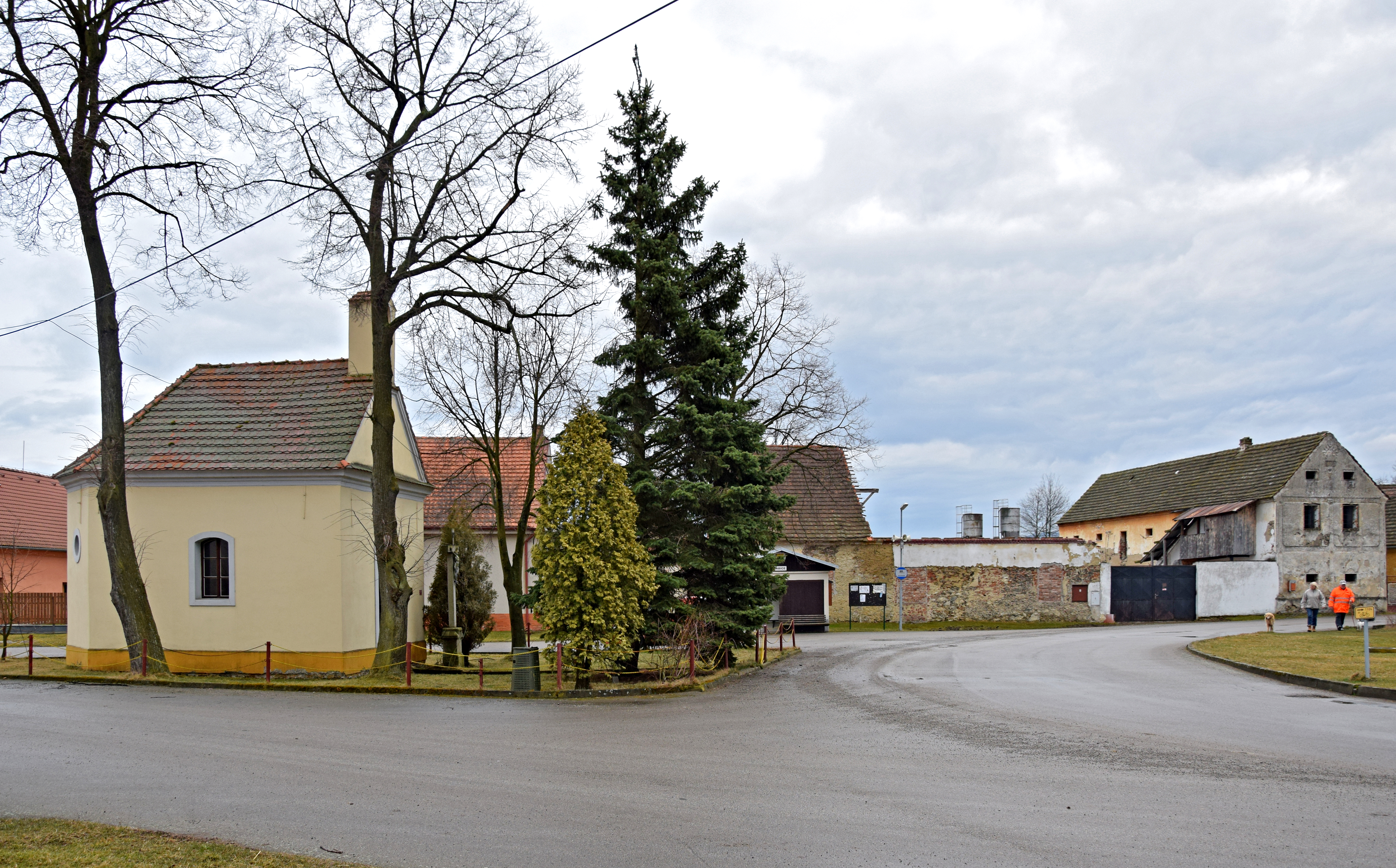
- Centre of Babice

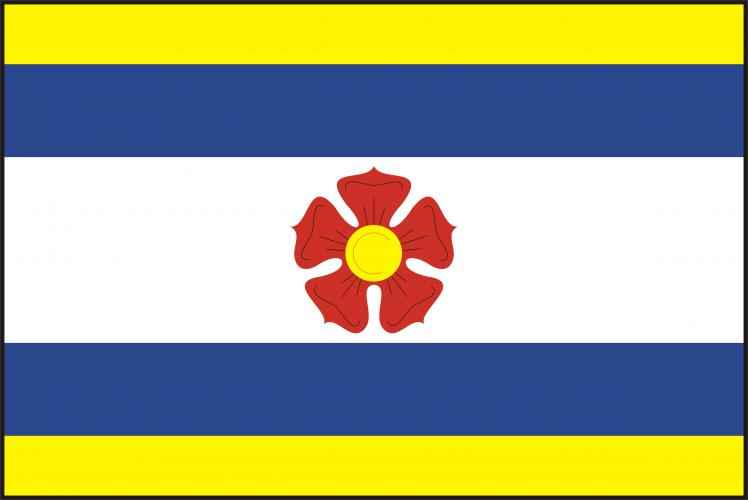
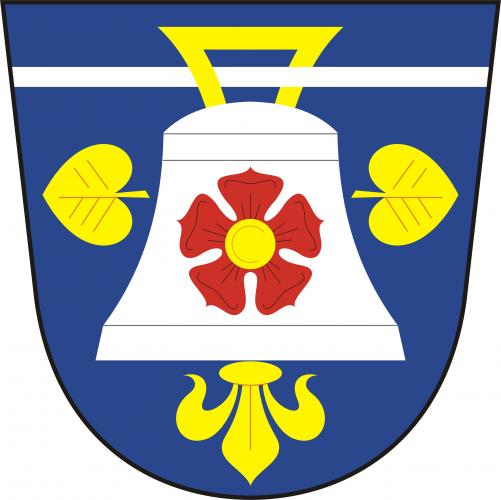
- Flag Coat of arms

- Location in the Czech Republic
- Coordinates: 49°1′29″N 14°14′15″E
- Country: Czech Republic
- Region: South Bohemian
- District: Prachatice
- First mentioned: 1259

Area
  - Total: 5.80 km^{2} (2.24 sq mi)
- Elevation: 447 m (1,467 ft)

Population (2026-01-01)
  - Total: 159
  - Density: 27.4/km^{2} (71.0/sq mi)
- Time zone: UTC+1 (CET)
  - Summer (DST): UTC+2 (CEST)
- Postal code: 384 11
- Website: www.babicept.cz

Babice (German: Bowitz) is a municipality and village in Prachatice District in the South Bohemian Region of the Czech Republic. It has about 200 inhabitants.

== Administrative division ==
Babice consists of two municipal parts (in brackets population according to the 2021 census):

- Babice (103)
- Zvěřetice (31)

== Etymology ==
The name is derived from the surname Bába, meaning "the village of Bába's people".

== Geography ==
Babice is located about 17 kilometres (11 mi) east of Prachatice and 17 km (11 mi) west of České Budějovice. It lies in the Bohemian Forest Foothills. The highest point is at 503 m (1,650 ft) above sea level. The stream Lužický potok flows through the municipality. The stream and its nameless tributary supply a system of several small fishponds here.

== History ==
The first written mention of Babice is from 1259. The village belonged to the Poděhusy estate until the destruction of the Poděhusy Castle in 1421. Between 1421 and 1503, Babice was a part of the Helfenburk estate. From 1503 until the establishment of a sovereign municipality in 1850, it belonged to the Krumlov estate. Between 1967 and 1991, Babice was a municipal part of Chvalovice (until 1976) and then Lužice, but then it regained its independence.

== Demographics ==
Historical population

Year	Pop.	±%
1869	295	—
1880	316	+7.1%
1890	269	−14.9%
1900	253	−5.9%
1910	271	+7.1%

Year	Pop.	±%
1921	276	+1.8%
1930	254	−8.0%
1950	160	−37.0%
1961	143	−10.6%
1970	117	−18.2%

Year	Pop.	±%
1980	65	−44.4%
1991	62	−4.6%
2001	78	+25.8%
2011	88	+12.8%
2021	134	+52.3%

Source: Censuses

== Transport ==
There are no railways or major roads passing through the municipality.

== Sights ==
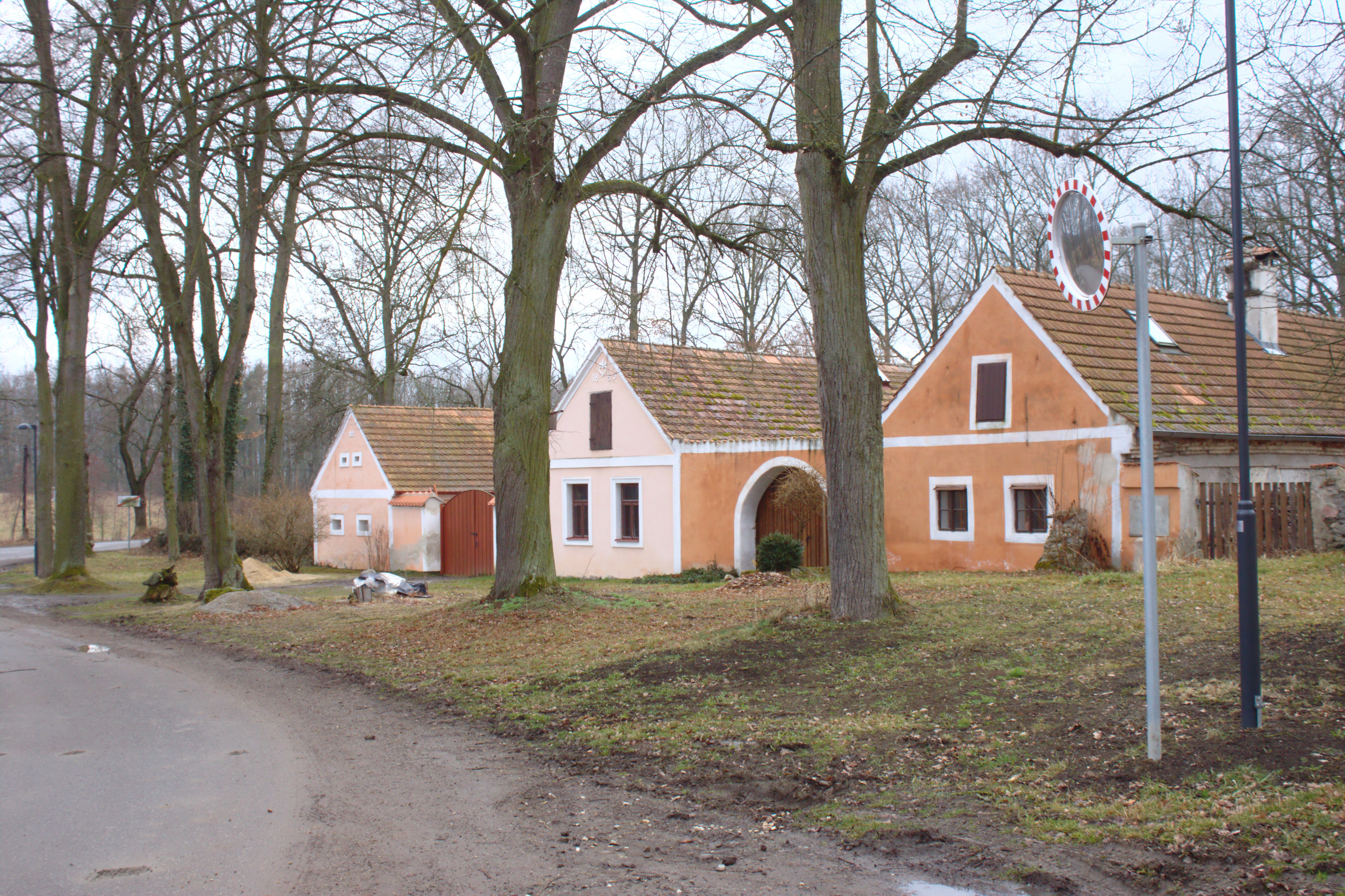
Folk architecture in Zvěřetice

A notable technical monument in Babice is a substation from 1929. It is a testament to the beginnings of electrification of the Czech countryside, and at the same time it is a valuable architectural element.

The village of Zvěřetice is protected as a village monument zone. The reason for the protection is the preserved historical farmsteads decorated with elements in the Folk Baroque and Neoclassical styles, typical of regional folk architecture. The main landmark of the village is the Chapel of Saint John of Nepomuk, a Neoclassical chapel from 1820.
