= Chvalovice (Znojmo District) =

- Municipality
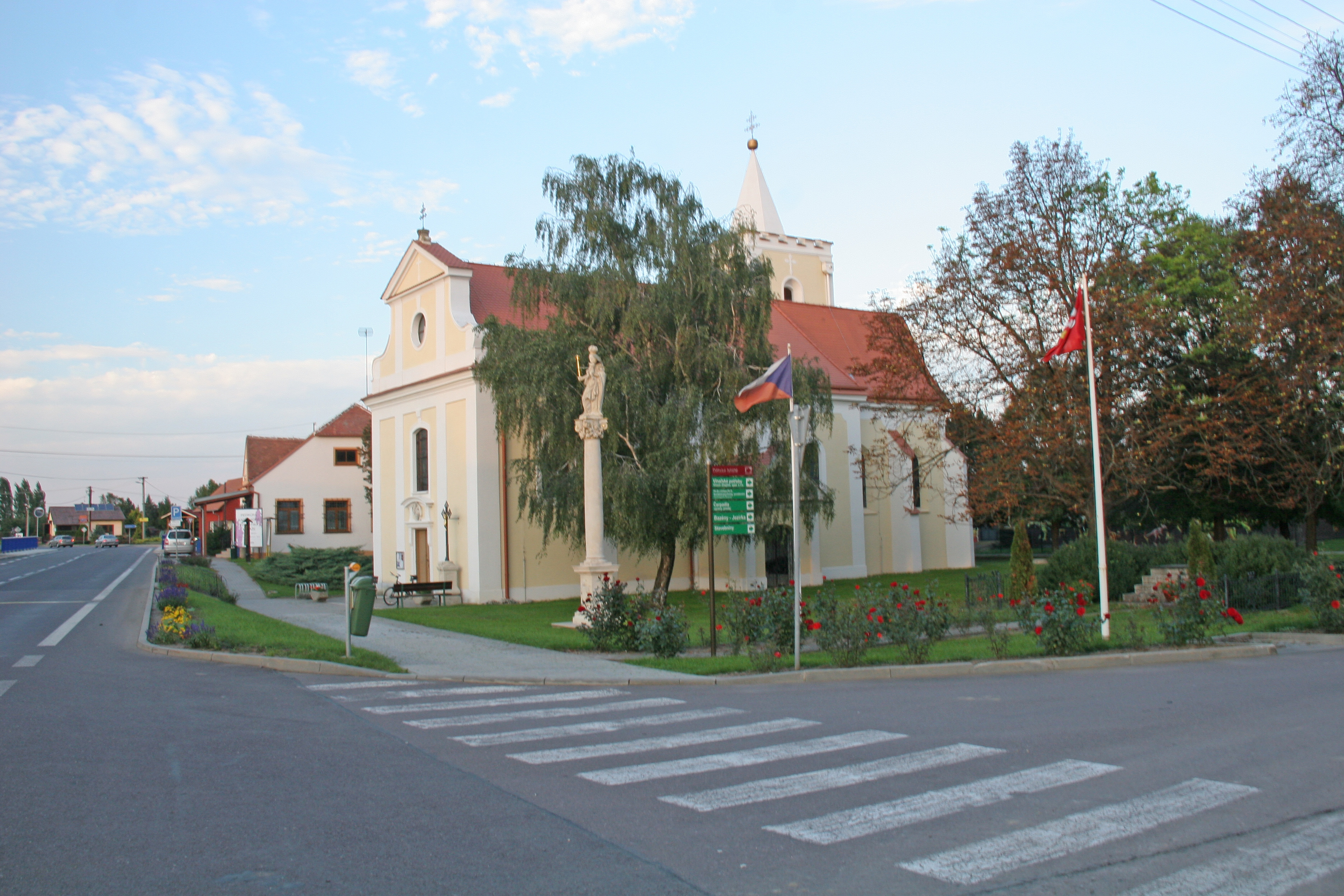
- Church of Saint Margaret

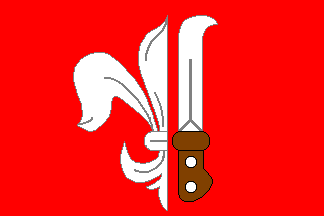
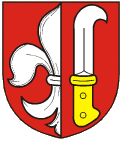
- Flag Coat of arms

- Location in the Czech Republic
- Coordinates: 48°47′12″N 16°4′56″E
- Country: Czech Republic
- Region: South Moravian
- District: Znojmo
- First mentioned: 1279

Area
  - Total: 8.84 km^{2} (3.41 sq mi)
- Elevation: 222 m (728 ft)

Population (2026-01-01)
  - Total: 686
  - Density: 77.6/km^{2} (201/sq mi)
- Time zone: UTC+1 (CET)
  - Summer (DST): UTC+2 (CEST)
- Postal code: 669 02
- Website: www.chvalovice.cz

Chvalovice (German: Kallendorf) is a municipality and village in Znojmo District in the South Moravian Region of the Czech Republic. It has about 700 inhabitants.

== Administrative division ==
Chvalovice consists of two municipal parts (in brackets population according to the 2021 census):

- Chvalovice (626)
- Hatě (0)

== Geography ==
Chvalovice is located about 7 kilometres (4 mi) southeast of Znojmo and 57 km (35 mi) southwest of Brno, on the border with Austria. It lies in an agricultural landscape in the Dyje–Svratka Valley. The highest point is at 270 m (886 ft) above sea level.

== History ==
The first written mention of Chvalovice is from 1279. The owners of the village often changed; among the most important were the Dietrichstein family, the Jesuit college in Znojmo and the Cistercian monastery in Tišnov. From the 17th century until 1784, it was property of the Premonstratensian Louka Monastery.

== Demographics ==
Historical population

Year	Pop.	±%
1869	692	—
1880	771	+11.4%
1890	808	+4.8%
1900	762	−5.7%
1910	760	−0.3%

Year	Pop.	±%
1921	690	−9.2%
1930	722	+4.6%
1950	493	−31.7%
1961	401	−18.7%
1970	373	−7.0%

Year	Pop.	±%
1980	377	+1.1%
1991	414	+9.8%
2001	417	+0.7%
2011	529	+26.9%
2021	626	+18.3%

Source: Censuses

== Transport ==
On the Czech–Austrian border is the road border crossing Hatě / Kleinhaugsdorf. The I/38 road (part of the European route E59) from Znojmo to the Czech–Austrian border runs through the municipality.

== Sights ==
The main landmark of Chvalovice is the Church of Saint Margaret. It is a Baroque building with a late Gothic core from the 15th century.
