= Krajníčko =

- Municipality
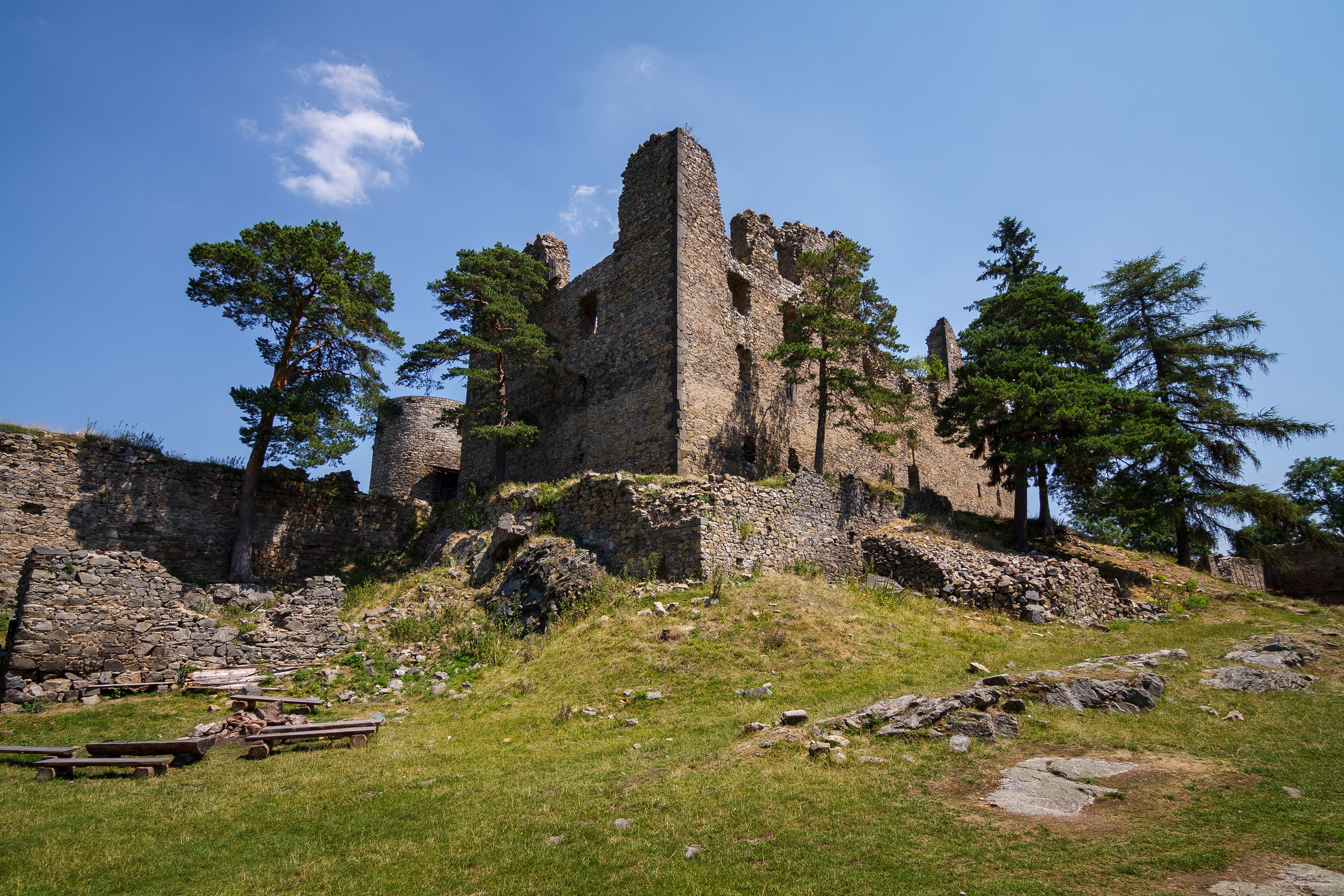
- Helfenburk Castle

- Flag Coat of arms

- Location in the Czech Republic
- Coordinates: 49°8′51″N 14°1′44″E
- Country: Czech Republic
- Region: South Bohemian
- District: Strakonice
- First mentioned: 1334

Area
  - Total: 7.52 km^{2} (2.90 sq mi)
- Elevation: 524 m (1,719 ft)

Population (2026-01-01)
  - Total: 98
  - Density: 13/km^{2} (34/sq mi)
- Time zone: UTC+1 (CET)
  - Summer (DST): UTC+2 (CEST)
- Postal code: 387 73
- Website: www.krajnicko.cz

Krajníčko is a municipality and village in Strakonice District in the South Bohemian Region of the Czech Republic. It has about 100 inhabitants.

Krajníčko lies approximately 16 kilometres (10 mi) south-east of Strakonice, 39 km (24 mi) north-west of České Budějovice, and 109 km (68 mi) south of Prague.

== Demographics ==
Historical population
Year	Pop.	±%
1869	241	—
1880	286	+18.7%
1890	275	−3.8%
1900	321	+16.7%
1910	314	−2.2%
1921	327	+4.1%
1930	289	−11.6%
1950	221	−23.5%
1961	202	−8.6%
1970	153	−24.3%
1980	118	−22.9%
1991	105	−11.0%
2001	94	−10.5%
2011	91	−3.2%
2021	95	+4.4%
Source: Censuses
