= Kovanice =

- Municipality
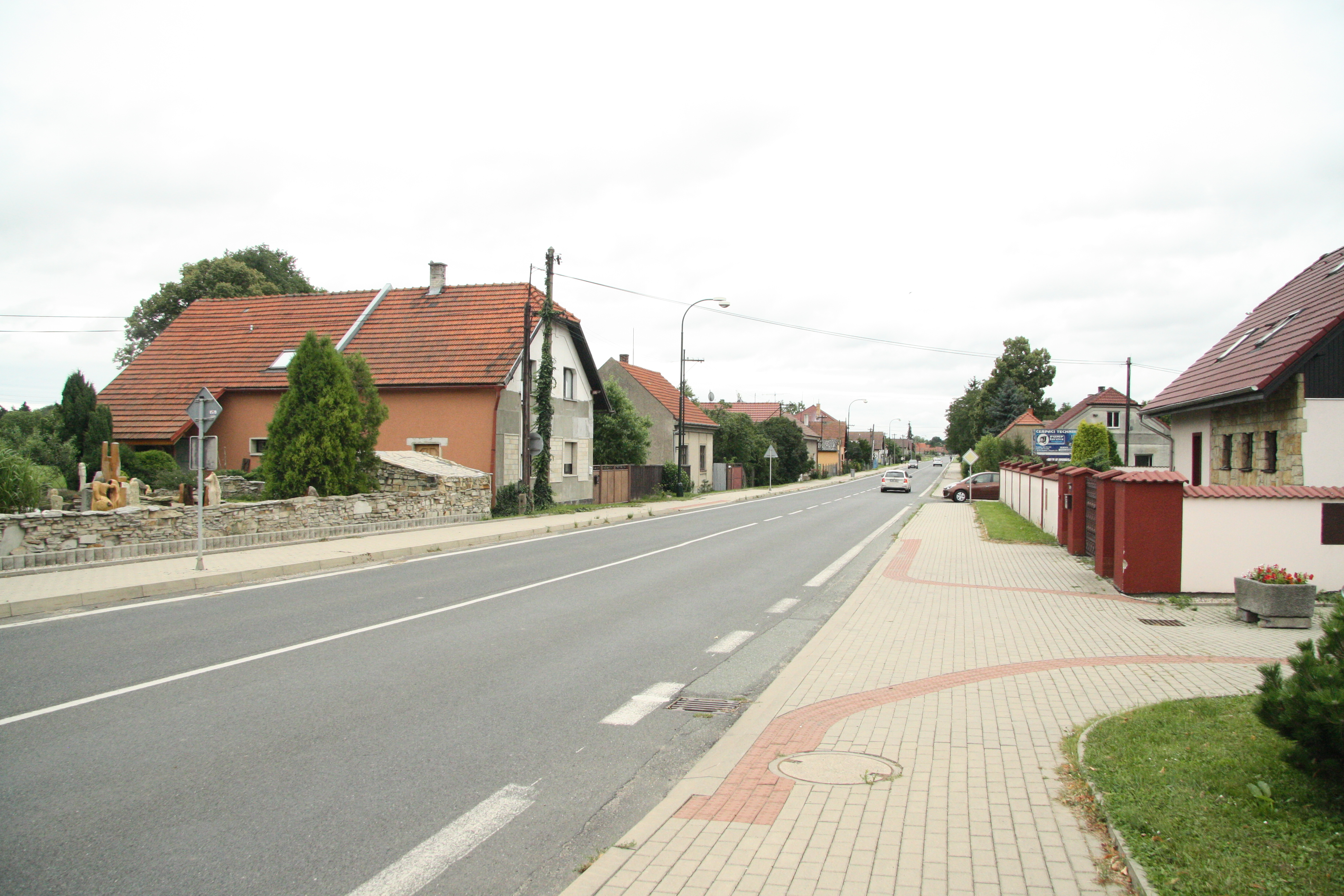
- Centre of Kovanice

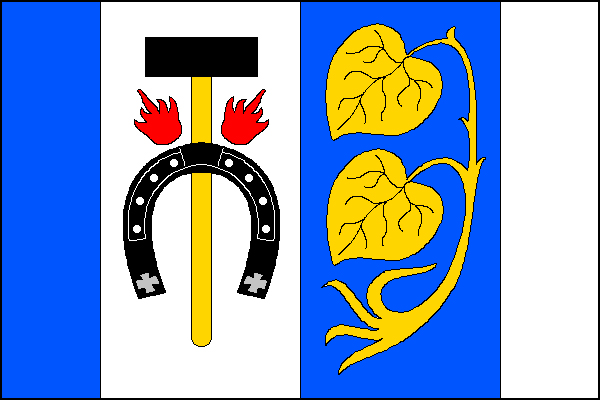
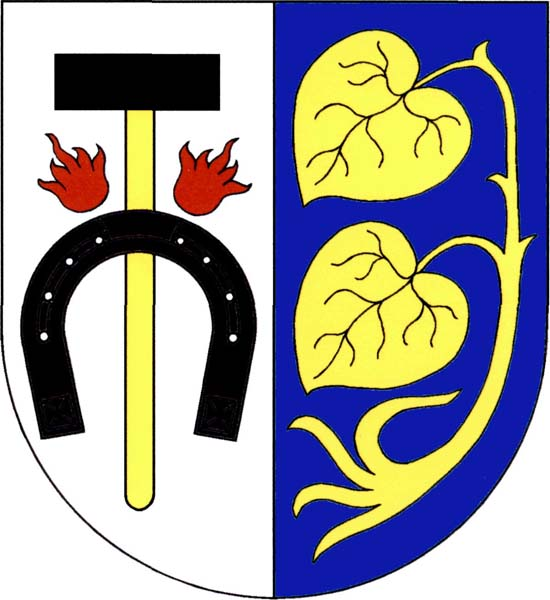
- Flag Coat of arms

- Location in the Czech Republic
- Coordinates: 50°10′10″N 15°4′15″E
- Country: Czech Republic
- Region: Central Bohemian
- District: Nymburk
- First mentioned: 1266

Area
  - Total: 8.07 km^{2} (3.12 sq mi)
- Elevation: 183 m (600 ft)

Population (2026-01-01)
  - Total: 974
  - Density: 121/km^{2} (313/sq mi)
- Time zone: UTC+1 (CET)
  - Summer (DST): UTC+2 (CEST)
- Postal code: 288 02
- Website: www.kovanice.cz

Kovanice is a municipality and village in Nymburk District in the Central Bohemian Region of the Czech Republic. It has about 1,000 inhabitants.

== Administrative division ==
Kovanice consists of two municipal parts (in brackets population according to the 2021 census):

- Kovanice (571)
- Chvalovice (325)

== Etymology ==
The name is derived from the personal name Kovan, meaning "the village of Kovan's people".

== Geography ==
Kovanice is located about 3 kilometres (2 mi) southeast of Nymburk and 39 km (24 mi) east of Prague. It lies in a flat agricultural landscape in the Central Elbe Table. The municipality is situated on the left bank of the Elbe River.

== History ==
The first written mention of Kovanice is from 1266. The owners of the village often changed and included various less important noblemen.

Chvalovice was first mentioned in 1390. In 1443, when the village was part of the Poděbrady estate, the village was fiefed to a noble family, which began to be called Chvalovský of Ledce. From 1492, they owned Chvalovice. From 1548 until 1582, when the last male member of the Chvalovský family died, they also ruled Kovanice. In 1582, Chvalovice was again annexed to the Poděbrady estate.

== Demographics ==
Historical population

Year	Pop.	±%
1869	912	—
1880	887	−2.7%
1890	927	+4.5%
1900	950	+2.5%
1910	956	+0.6%

Year	Pop.	±%
1921	992	+3.8%
1930	914	−7.9%
1950	750	−17.9%
1961	746	−0.5%
1970	659	−11.7%

Year	Pop.	±%
1980	690	+4.7%
1991	672	−2.6%
2001	720	+7.1%
2011	802	+11.4%
2021	896	+11.7%

Source: Censuses

== Transport ==
The I/38 road (the section from Nymburk to Kutná Hora) runs through the eastern part of the municipality.

== Sights ==
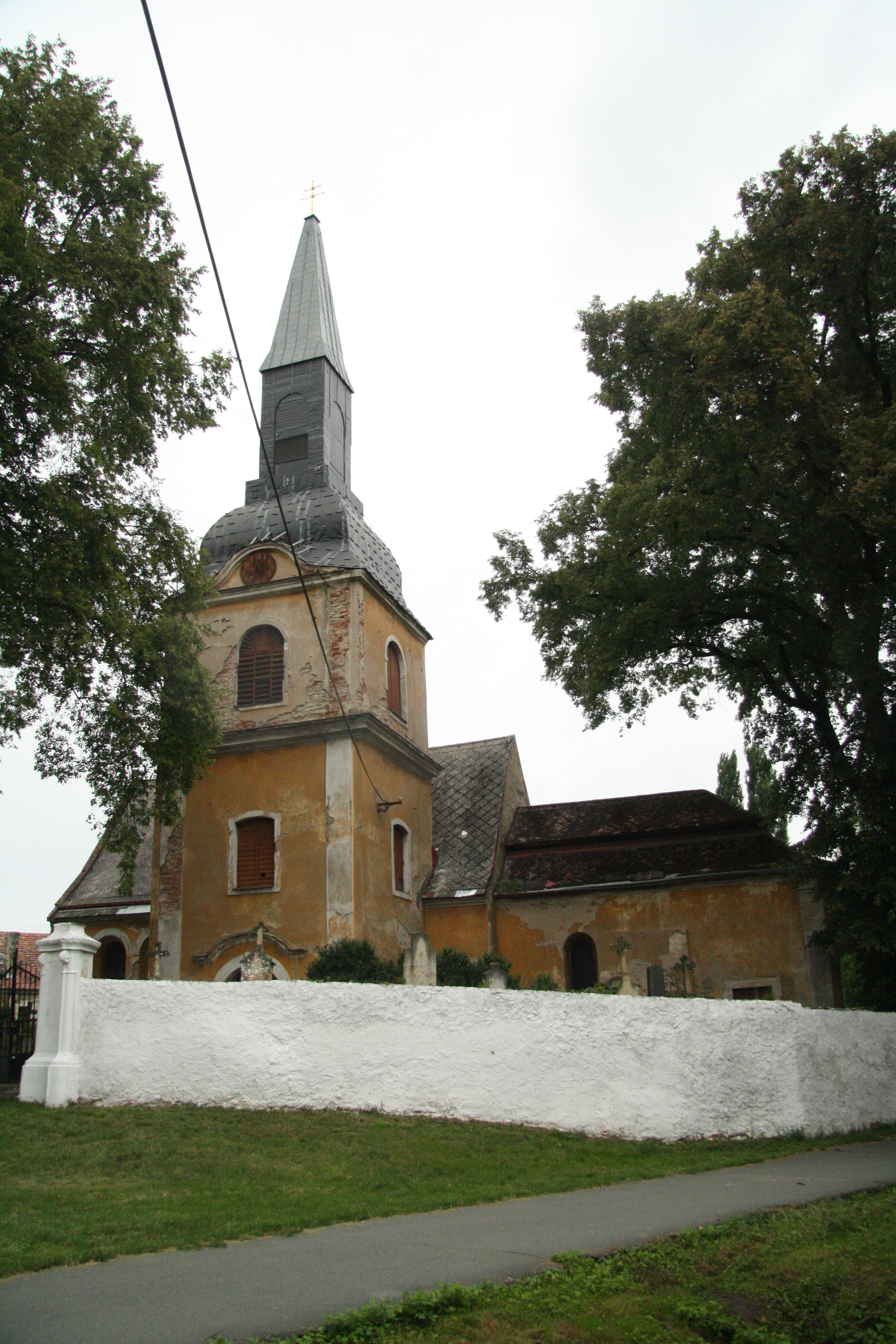
Church of Saint Wenceslaus

The main landmark of Kovanice is the Church of Saint Wenceslaus. Originally a Gothic church from the 14th century, it was rebuilt in the Baroque style in the 18th century. In 1897, it was rebuilt to its present form.

A notable building is the former Renaissance fortress, rebuilt into a small Baroque manor house. Today it is privately owned and inacessible.

Southwest of Kovanice is a Jewish cemetery with tombstones from the first half of the 19th century.
