= Chvalovice (Prachatice District) =

- Municipality
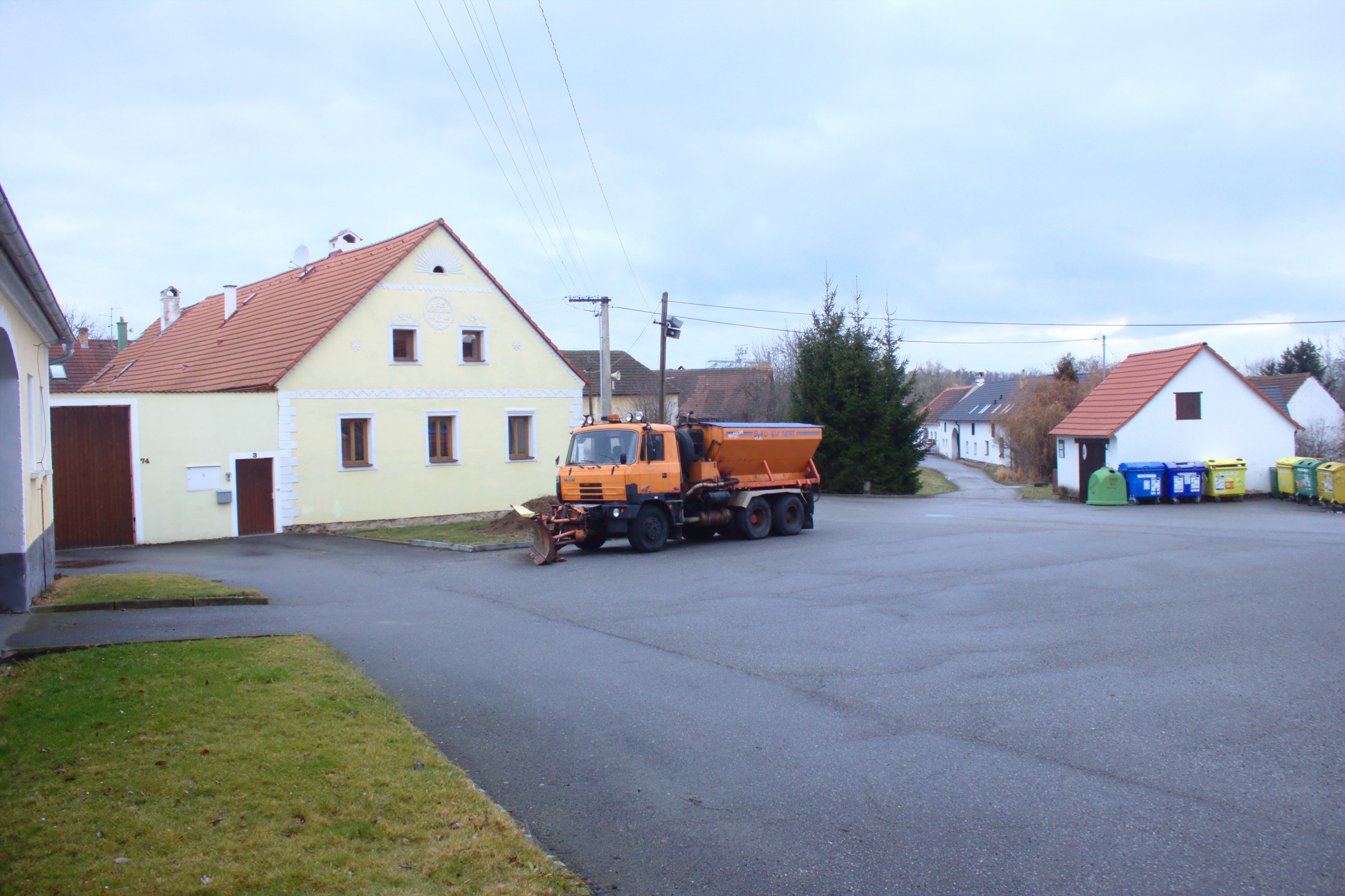
- Centre of Chvalovice

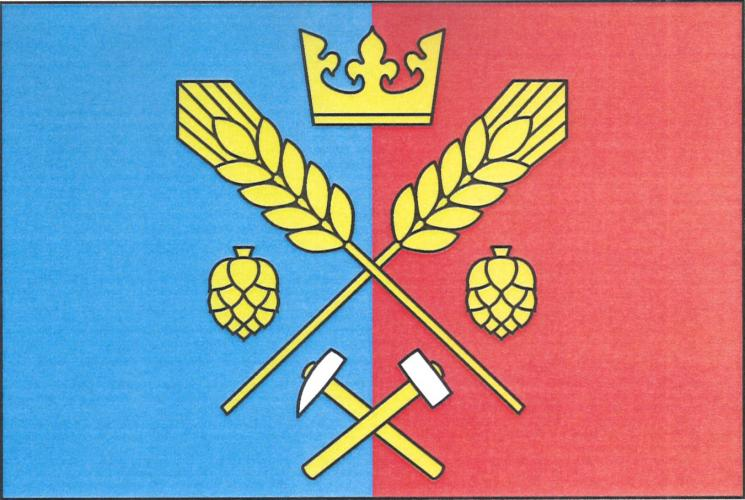
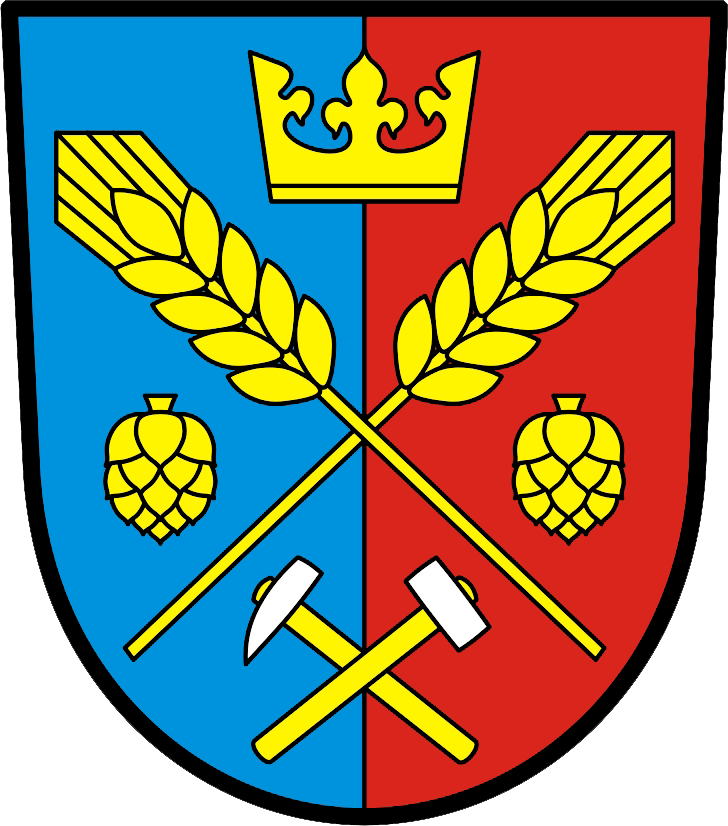
- Flag Coat of arms

- Location in the Czech Republic
- Coordinates: 49°0′38″N 14°13′54″E
- Country: Czech Republic
- Region: South Bohemian
- District: Prachatice
- First mentioned: 1263

Area
  - Total: 3.97 km^{2} (1.53 sq mi)
- Elevation: 465 m (1,526 ft)

Population (2026-01-01)
  - Total: 174
  - Density: 43.8/km^{2} (114/sq mi)
- Time zone: UTC+1 (CET)
  - Summer (DST): UTC+2 (CEST)
- Postal code: 384 11
- Website: www.chvaloviceunetolic.cz

Chvalovice is a municipality and village in Prachatice District in the South Bohemian Region of the Czech Republic. It has about 200 inhabitants.

Chvalovice lies approximately 18 kilometres (11 mi) east of Prachatice, 19 km (12 mi) west of České Budějovice, and 121 km (75 mi) south of Prague.

== Demographics ==
Historical population
Year	Pop.	±%
1869	222	—
1880	223	+0.5%
1890	209	−6.3%
1900	254	+21.5%
1910	262	+3.1%
1921	247	−5.7%
1930	243	−1.6%
1950	197	−18.9%
1961	199	+1.0%
1970	168	−15.6%
1980	195	+16.1%
1991	197	+1.0%
2001	192	−2.5%
2011	179	−6.8%
2021	159	−11.2%
Source: Censuses
