= Radějovice =

Radějovice may refer to places in the Czech Republic:

- Radějovice (Prague-East District), a municipality and village in the Central Bohemian Region
- Radějovice (Strakonice District), a municipality and village in the South Bohemian Region
- Radějovice, a village and part of Netvořice in the Central Bohemian Region
- Radějovice, a village and part of Přehýšov in the Plzeň Region
