= Tresovice =

Tresovice may refer to places in the Czech Republic:

- Třesovice, a municipality and village in the Hradec Králové Region
- Třešovice, a municipality and village in the South Bohemian Region

== See also ==
- Střešovice, a cadastral area of Prague
