= Zvotoky =

- Municipality
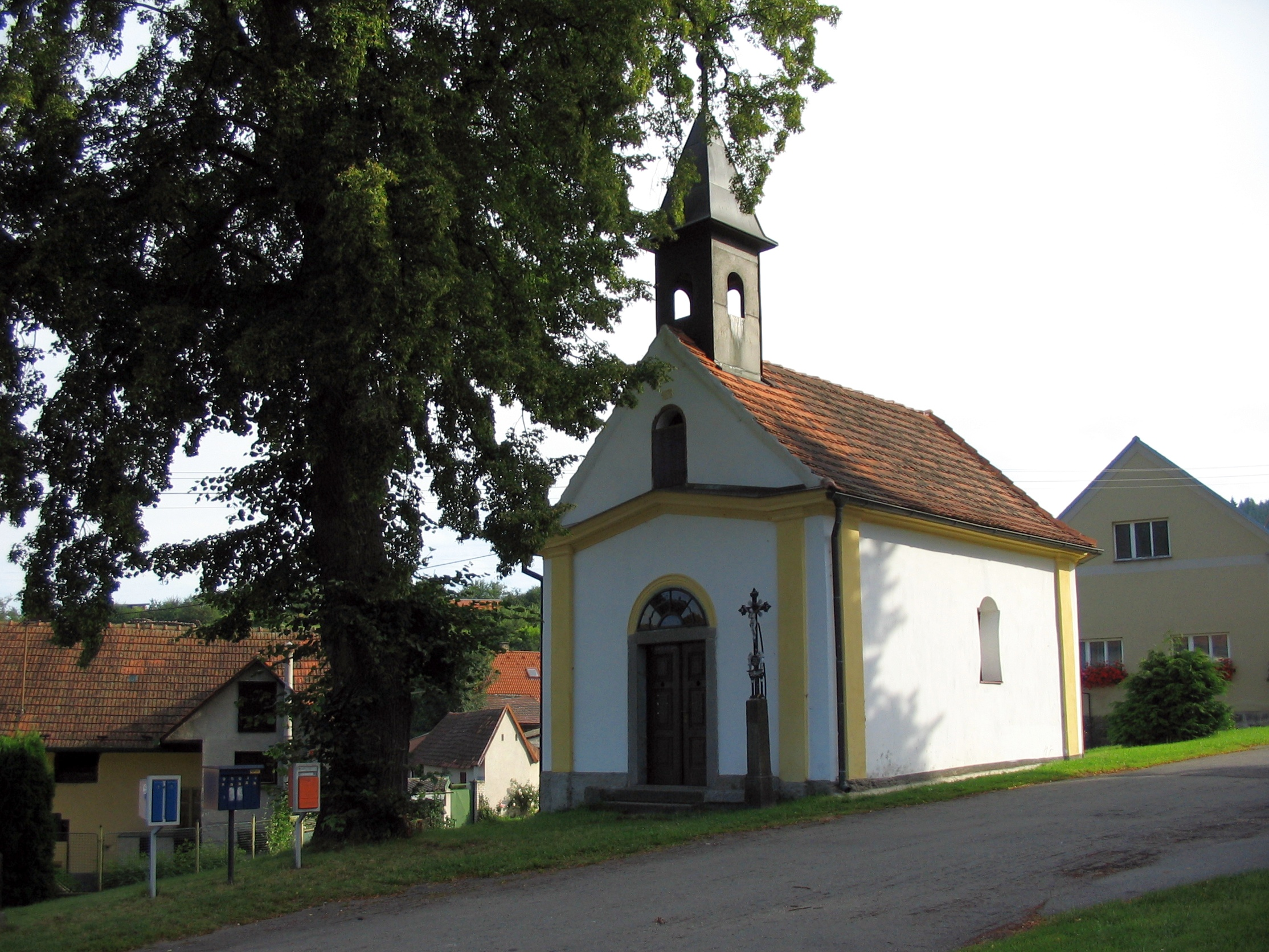
- Chapel of the Holy Guardian Angels

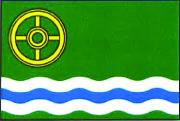
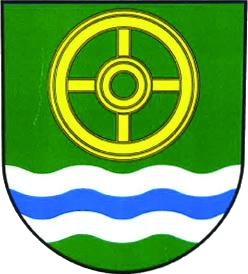
- Flag Coat of arms

- Location in the Czech Republic
- Coordinates: 49°12′45″N 13°45′28″E
- Country: Czech Republic
- Region: South Bohemian
- District: Strakonice
- First mentioned: 1045

Area
  - Total: 3.93 km^{2} (1.52 sq mi)
- Elevation: 513 m (1,683 ft)

Population (2026-01-01)
  - Total: 55
  - Density: 14/km^{2} (36/sq mi)
- Time zone: UTC+1 (CET)
  - Summer (DST): UTC+2 (CEST)
- Postal code: 387 16
- Website: www.zvotoky.cz

Zvotoky is a municipality and village in Strakonice District in the South Bohemian Region of the Czech Republic. It has about 60 inhabitants.

Zvotoky lies approximately 12 kilometres (7 mi) south-west of Strakonice, 59 km (37 mi) north-west of České Budějovice, and 109 km (68 mi) south-west of Prague.

== Demographics ==
Historical population
Year	Pop.	±%
1869	274	—
1880	276	+0.7%
1890	257	−6.9%
1900	268	+4.3%
1910	289	+7.8%
1921	287	−0.7%
1930	246	−14.3%
1950	161	−34.6%
1961	145	−9.9%
1970	108	−25.5%
1980	88	−18.5%
1991	82	−6.8%
2001	74	−9.8%
2011	62	−16.2%
2021	60	−3.2%
Source: Censuses
