= Nihošovice =

- Municipality
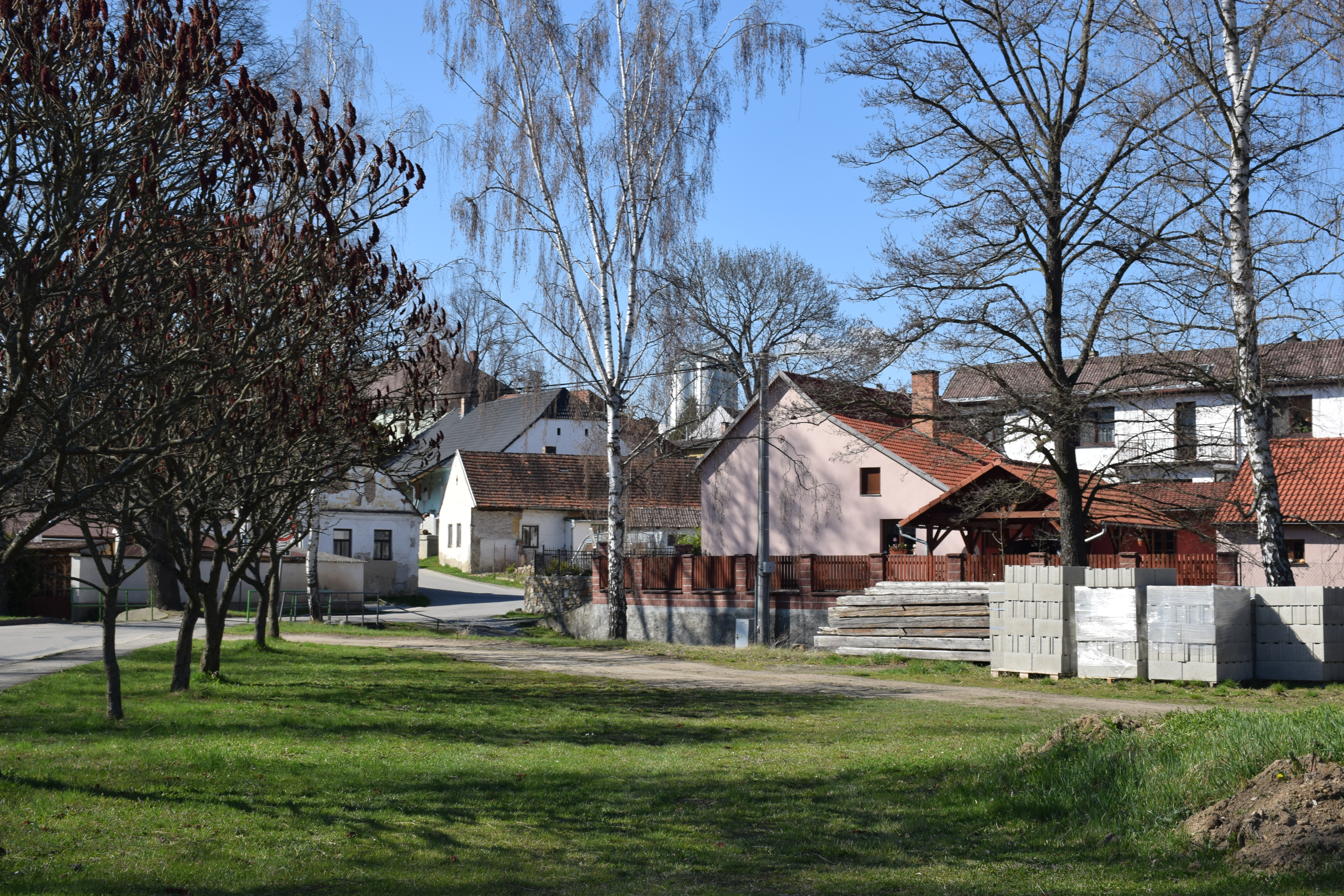
- Centre of Nihošovice

- Location in the Czech Republic
- Coordinates: 49°11′18″N 13°51′42″E
- Country: Czech Republic
- Region: South Bohemian
- District: Strakonice
- First mentioned: 1352

Area
  - Total: 8.94 km^{2} (3.45 sq mi)
- Elevation: 450 m (1,480 ft)

Population (2026-01-01)
  - Total: 316
  - Density: 35.3/km^{2} (91.5/sq mi)
- Time zone: UTC+1 (CET)
  - Summer (DST): UTC+2 (CEST)
- Postal codes: 387 01, 387 19
- Website: www.nihosovice.cz

Nihošovice is a municipality and village in Strakonice District in the South Bohemian Region of the Czech Republic. It has about 300 inhabitants.

Nihošovice lies approximately 10 kilometres (6 mi) south-west of Strakonice, 52 km (32 mi) north-west of České Budějovice, and 109 km (68 mi) south of Prague.

== Administrative division ==
Nihošovice consists of two municipal parts (in brackets population according to the 2021 census):

- Nihošovice (268)
- Jetišov (32)

Jetišov forms an exclave of the municipal territory.

== Demographics ==
Historical population
Year	Pop.	±%
1869	532	—
1880	575	+8.1%
1890	562	−2.3%
1900	640	+13.9%
1910	626	−2.2%
1921	599	−4.3%
1930	532	−11.2%
1950	410	−22.9%
1961	380	−7.3%
1970	333	−12.4%
1980	244	−26.7%
1991	256	+4.9%
2001	288	+12.5%
2011	295	+2.4%
2021	300	+1.7%
Source: Censuses
