= Hornosín =

- Municipality
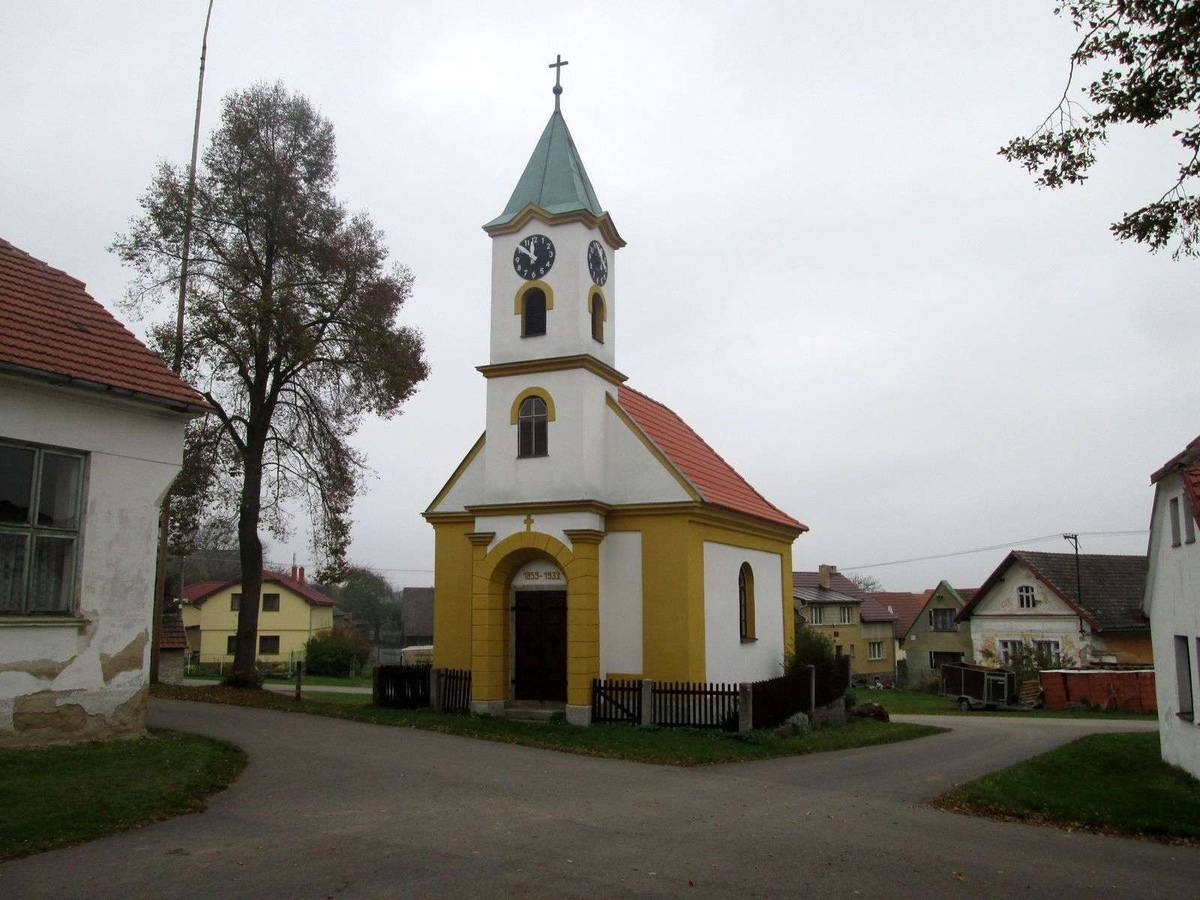
- Chapel of Saint Florian

- Flag Coat of arms

- Location in the Czech Republic
- Coordinates: 49°28′58″N 13°50′23″E
- Country: Czech Republic
- Region: South Bohemian
- District: Strakonice
- First mentioned: 1318

Area
  - Total: 3.41 km^{2} (1.32 sq mi)
- Elevation: 510 m (1,670 ft)

Population (2026-01-01)
  - Total: 62
  - Density: 18/km^{2} (47/sq mi)
- Time zone: UTC+1 (CET)
  - Summer (DST): UTC+2 (CEST)
- Postal code: 387 42
- Website: www.hornosin.cz

Hornosín is a municipality and village in Strakonice District in the South Bohemian Region of the Czech Republic. It has about 60 inhabitants.

Hornosín lies approximately 25 kilometres (16 mi) north of Strakonice, 73 km (45 mi) north-west of České Budějovice, and 80 km (50 mi) south-west of Prague.

== Demographics ==
Historical population
Year	Pop.	±%
1869	240	—
1880	257	+7.1%
1890	219	−14.8%
1900	194	−11.4%
1910	200	+3.1%
1921	196	−2.0%
1930	188	−4.1%
1950	150	−20.2%
1961	145	−3.3%
1970	123	−15.2%
1980	114	−7.3%
1991	86	−24.6%
2001	71	−17.4%
2011	65	−8.5%
2021	63	−3.1%
Source: Censuses
