= Štěchovice (Strakonice District) =

- Municipality
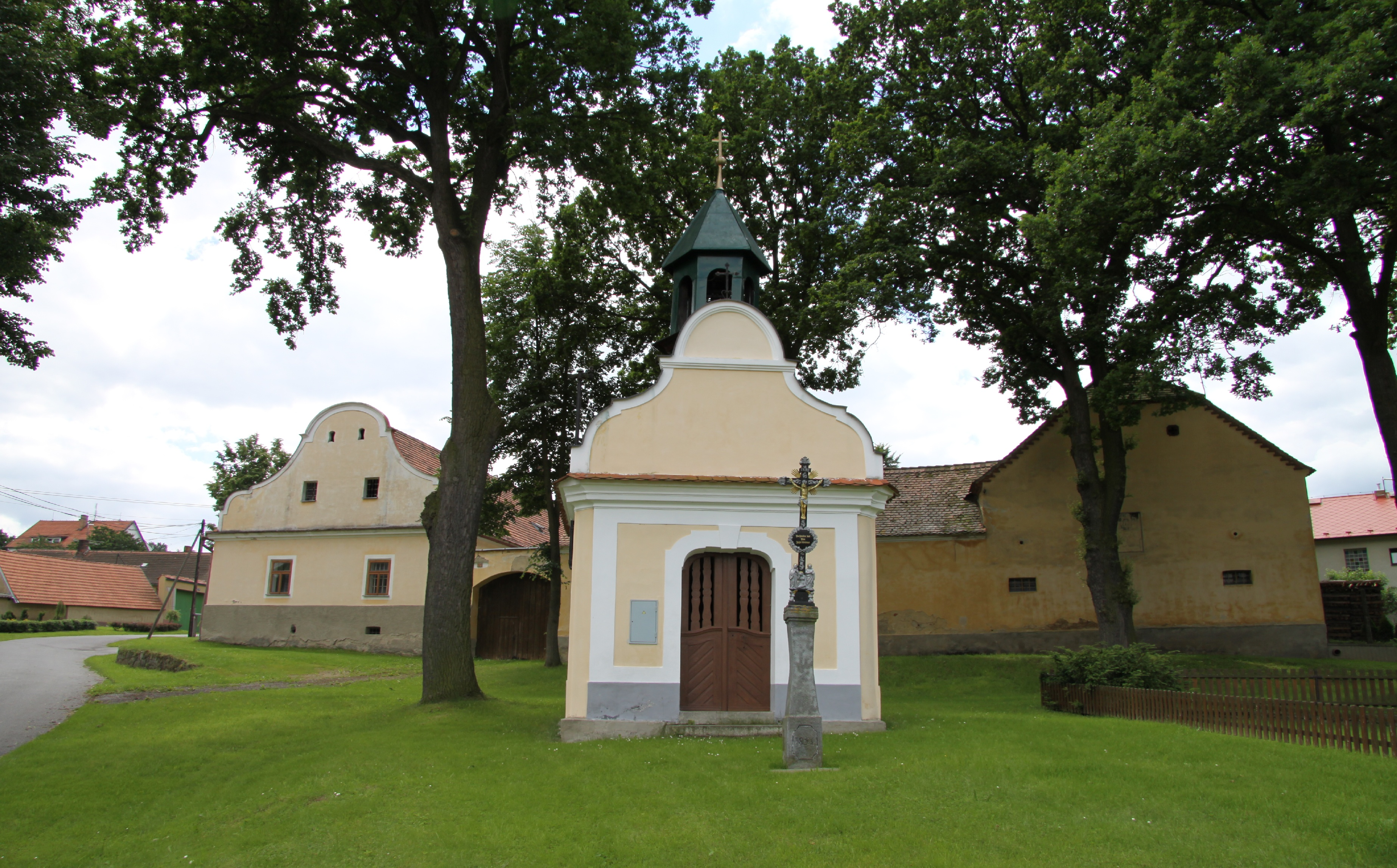
- Chapel of Saint John of Nepomuk

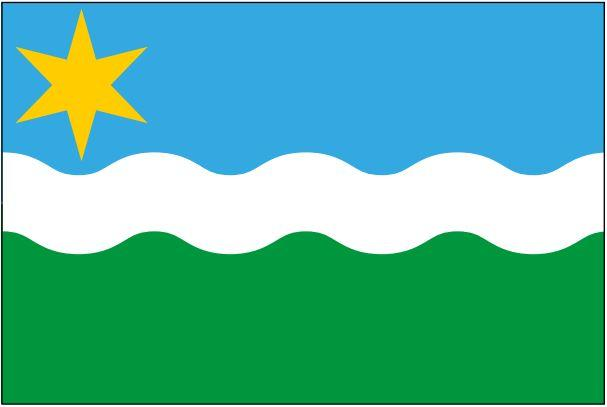
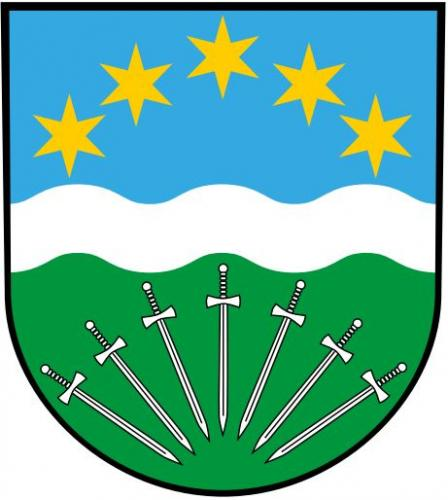
- Flag Coat of arms

- Location in the Czech Republic
- Coordinates: 49°15′20″N 13°45′56″E
- Country: Czech Republic
- Region: South Bohemian
- District: Strakonice
- First mentioned: 1408

Area
  - Total: 7.28 km^{2} (2.81 sq mi)
- Elevation: 435 m (1,427 ft)

Population (2026-01-01)
  - Total: 203
  - Density: 27.9/km^{2} (72.2/sq mi)
- Time zone: UTC+1 (CET)
  - Summer (DST): UTC+2 (CEST)
- Postal code: 387 16
- Website: www.stechovice-st.cz

Štěchovice is a municipality and village in Strakonice District in the South Bohemian Region of the Czech Republic. It has about 200 inhabitants.

Štěchovice lies approximately 11 kilometres (7 mi) west of Strakonice, 61 km (38 mi) north-west of České Budějovice, and 105 km (65 mi) south-west of Prague.

== Demographics ==
Historical population
Year	Pop.	±%
1869	534	—
1880	600	+12.4%
1890	471	−21.5%
1900	470	−0.2%
1910	467	−0.6%
1921	450	−3.6%
1930	411	−8.7%
1950	306	−25.5%
1961	305	−0.3%
1970	246	−19.3%
1980	251	+2.0%
1991	215	−14.3%
2001	223	+3.7%
2011	218	−2.2%
2021	190	−12.8%
Source: Censuses
