= Sousedovice =

- Municipality
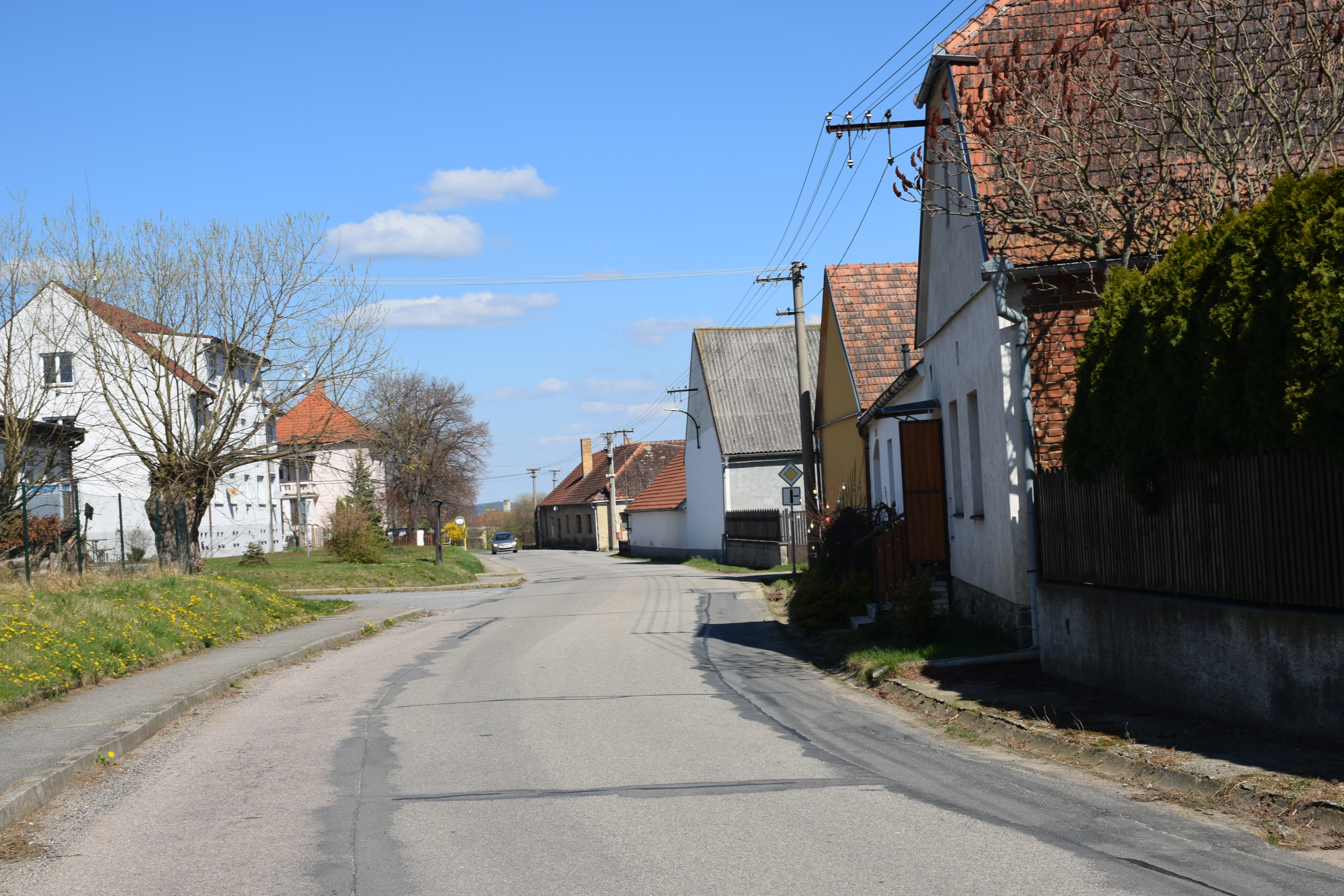
- Main street

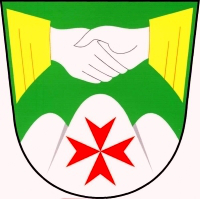
- Flag Coat of arms

- Location in the Czech Republic
- Coordinates: 49°13′56″N 13°52′7″E
- Country: Czech Republic
- Region: South Bohemian
- District: Strakonice
- First mentioned: 1243

Area
  - Total: 4.09 km^{2} (1.58 sq mi)
- Elevation: 438 m (1,437 ft)

Population (2026-01-01)
  - Total: 334
  - Density: 81.7/km^{2} (212/sq mi)
- Time zone: UTC+1 (CET)
  - Summer (DST): UTC+2 (CEST)
- Postal code: 386 01
- Website: sousedovice.info

Sousedovice is a municipality and village in Strakonice District in the South Bohemian Region of the Czech Republic. It has about 300 inhabitants.

Sousedovice lies approximately 5 kilometres (3 mi) south-west of Strakonice, 53 km (33 mi) north-west of České Budějovice, and 104 km (65 mi) south-west of Prague.

== Administrative division ==
Sousedovice consists of two municipal parts (in brackets population according to the 2021 census):

- Sousedovice (280)
- Smiradice (34)

== Demographics ==
Historical population
| Year | Pop. | ±% |
|---|---|---|
| 1869 | 325 | — |
| 1880 | 332 | +2.2% |
| 1890 | 285 | −14.2% |
| 1900 | 293 | +2.8% |
| 1910 | 278 | −5.1% |
| 1921 | 274 | −1.4% |
| 1930 | 278 | +1.5% |
| 1950 | 249 | −10.4% |
| 1961 | 214 | −14.1% |
| 1970 | 158 | −26.2% |
| 1980 | 188 | +19.0% |
| 1991 | 177 | −5.9% |
| 2001 | 224 | +26.6% |
| 2011 | 279 | +24.6% |
| 2021 | 314 | +12.5% |
Source: Censuses
