= Drachkov =

- Municipality
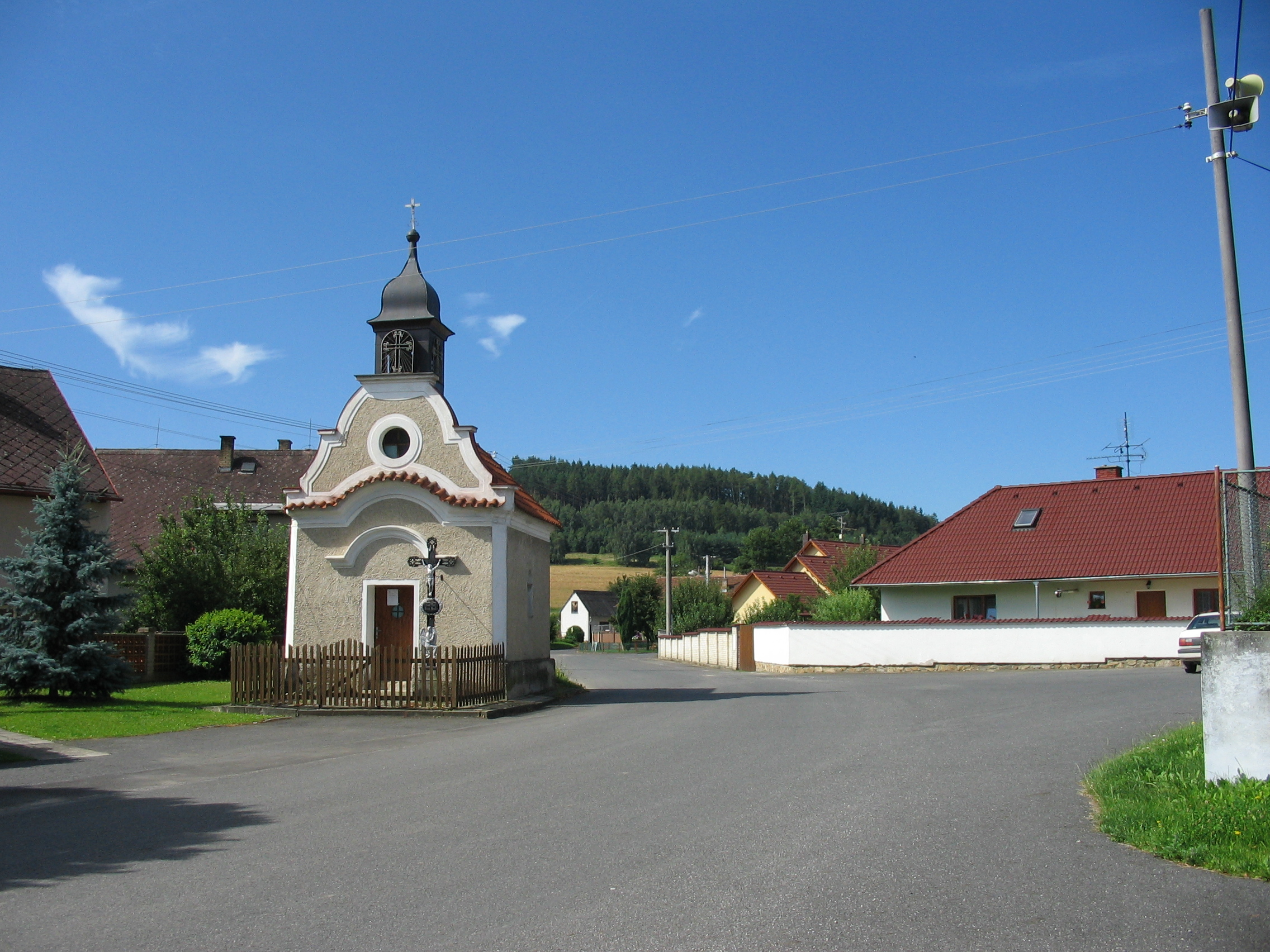
- Centre of Drachkov

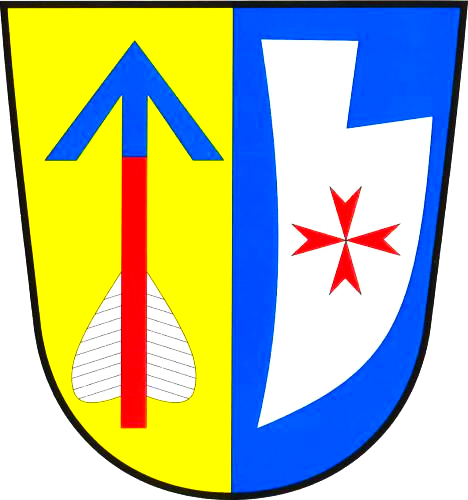
- Flag Coat of arms

- Location in the Czech Republic
- Coordinates: 49°14′34″N 13°50′30″E
- Country: Czech Republic
- Region: South Bohemian
- District: Strakonice
- First mentioned: 1319

Area
  - Total: 3.39 km^{2} (1.31 sq mi)
- Elevation: 450 m (1,480 ft)

Population (2026-01-01)
  - Total: 196
  - Density: 57.8/km^{2} (150/sq mi)
- Time zone: UTC+1 (CET)
  - Summer (DST): UTC+2 (CEST)
- Postal code: 386 01
- Website: www.obecdrachkov.cz

Drachkov is a municipality and village in Strakonice District in the South Bohemian Region of the Czech Republic. It has about 200 inhabitants.

Drachkov lies approximately 6 kilometres (4 mi) south-west of Strakonice, 56 km (35 mi) north-west of České Budějovice, and 103 km (64 mi) south-west of Prague.

== Demographics ==
Historical population
Year	Pop.	±%
1869	158	—
1880	164	+3.8%
1890	176	+7.3%
1900	177	+0.6%
1910	166	−6.2%
1921	170	+2.4%
1930	159	−6.5%
1950	126	−20.8%
1961	128	+1.6%
1970	119	−7.0%
1980	115	−3.4%
1991	148	+28.7%
2001	146	−1.4%
2011	172	+17.8%
2021	184	+7.0%
Source: Censuses
