= Čepřovice =

- Municipality
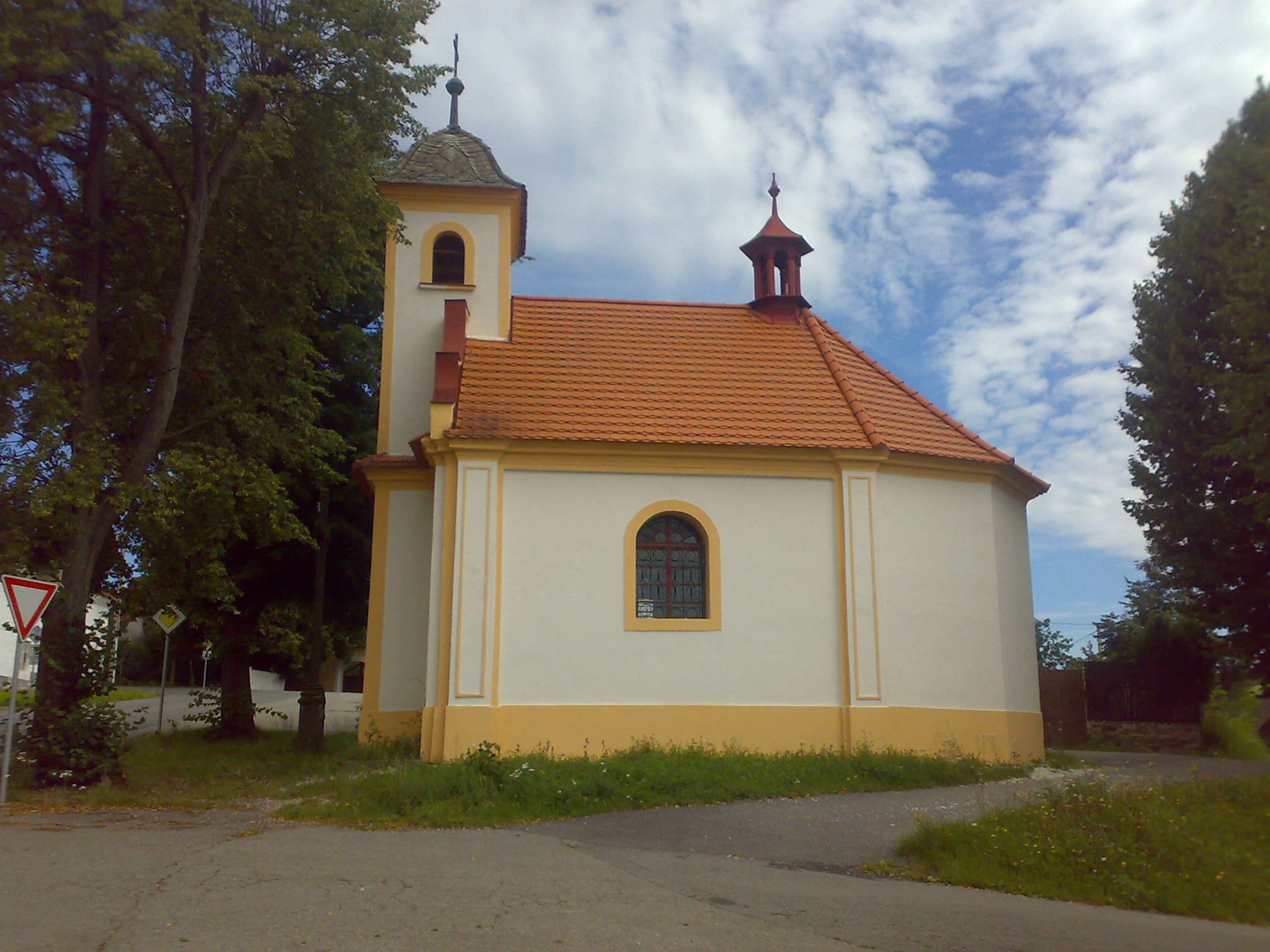
- Chapel in Čepřovice

- Flag Coat of arms

- Location in the Czech Republic
- Coordinates: 49°9′19″N 13°58′30″E
- Country: Czech Republic
- Region: South Bohemian
- District: Strakonice
- First mentioned: 1315

Area
  - Total: 10.22 km^{2} (3.95 sq mi)
- Elevation: 529 m (1,736 ft)

Population (2026-01-01)
  - Total: 217
  - Density: 21.2/km^{2} (55.0/sq mi)
- Time zone: UTC+1 (CET)
  - Summer (DST): UTC+2 (CEST)
- Postal code: 387 01
- Website: www.ceprovice.cz

Čepřovice is a municipality and village in Strakonice District in the South Bohemian Region of the Czech Republic. It has about 200 inhabitants.

Čepřovice lies approximately 13 kilometres (8 mi) south-east of Strakonice, 42 km (26 mi) north-west of České Budějovice, and 109 km (68 mi) south of Prague.

== Administrative division ==
Čepřovice consists of three municipal parts (in brackets population according to the 2021 census):

- Čepřovice (103)
- Jiřetice (37)
- Koječín (41)

== Demographics ==
Historical population
Year	Pop.	±%
1869	599	—
1880	644	+7.5%
1890	669	+3.9%
1900	643	−3.9%
1910	641	−0.3%
1921	637	−0.6%
1930	558	−12.4%
1950	373	−33.2%
1961	333	−10.7%
1970	287	−13.8%
1980	247	−13.9%
1991	205	−17.0%
2001	194	−5.4%
2011	171	−11.9%
2021	181	+5.8%
Source: Censuses
