= Krejnice =

- Municipality
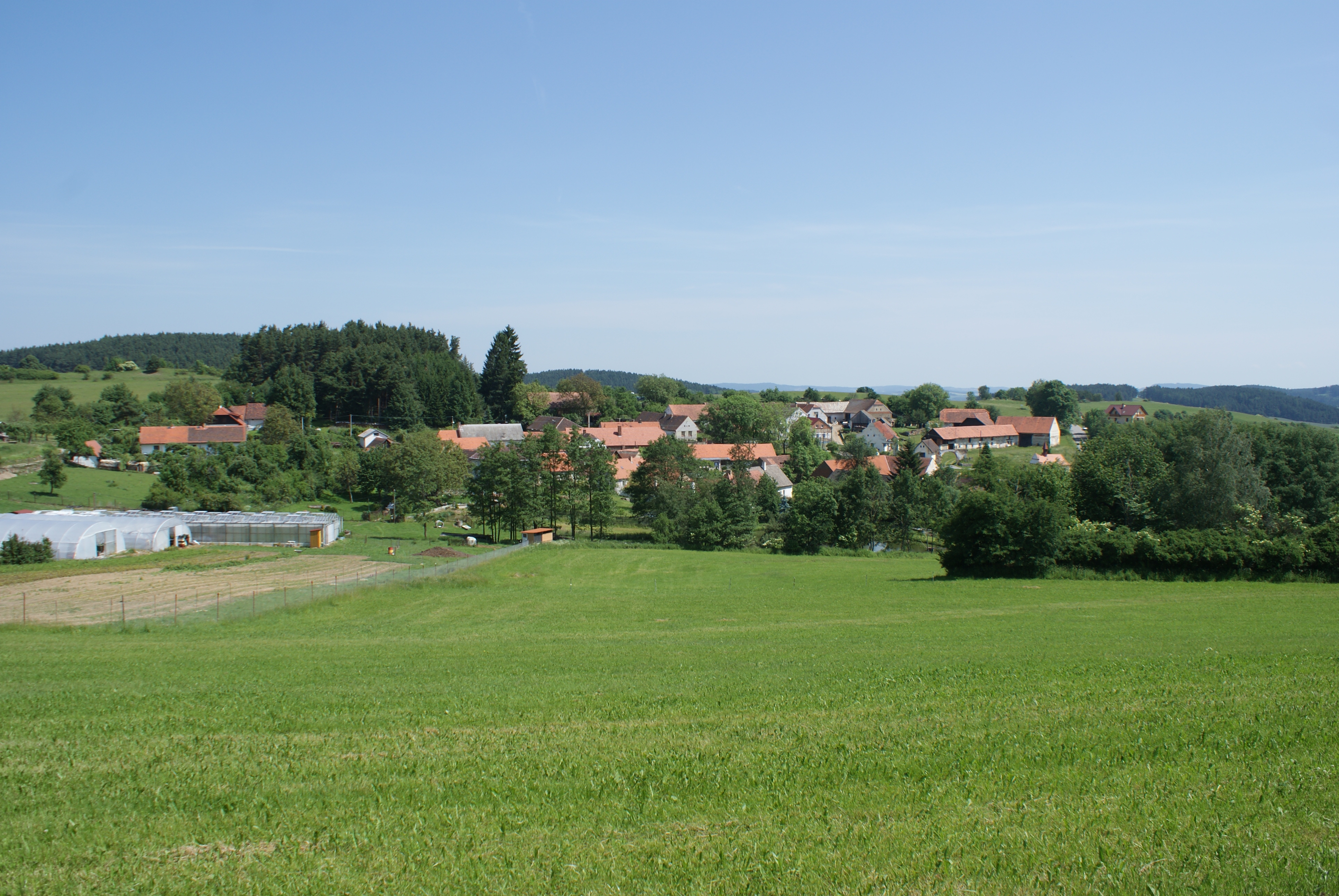
- General view

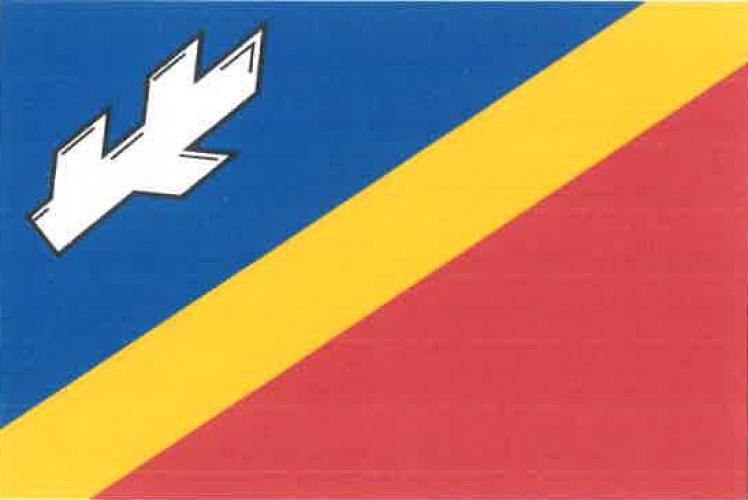
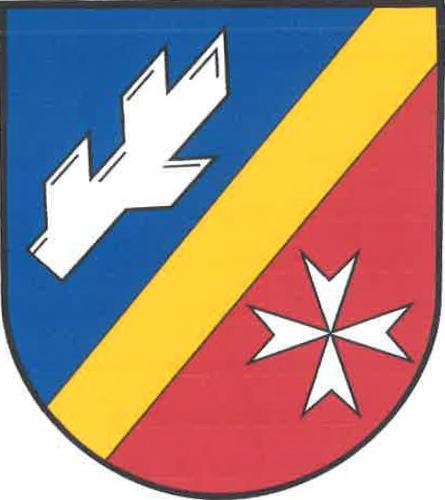
- Flag Coat of arms

- Location in the Czech Republic
- Coordinates: 49°14′2″N 13°43′7″E
- Country: Czech Republic
- Region: South Bohemian
- District: Strakonice
- First mentioned: 1336

Area
  - Total: 3.46 km^{2} (1.34 sq mi)
- Elevation: 524 m (1,719 ft)

Population (2026-01-01)
  - Total: 68
  - Density: 20/km^{2} (51/sq mi)
- Time zone: UTC+1 (CET)
  - Summer (DST): UTC+2 (CEST)
- Postal code: 387 16
- Website: www.krejnice.cz

Krejnice is a municipality and village in Strakonice District in the South Bohemian Region of the Czech Republic. It has about 70 inhabitants.

Krejnice lies approximately 14 kilometres (9 mi) west of Strakonice, 63 km (39 mi) north-west of České Budějovice, and 108 km (67 mi) south-west of Prague.

== Demographics ==
Historical population
Year	Pop.	±%
1869	292	—
1880	280	−4.1%
1890	280	+0.0%
1900	280	+0.0%
1910	297	+6.1%
1921	275	−7.4%
1930	218	−20.7%
1950	182	−16.5%
1961	151	−17.0%
1970	114	−24.5%
1980	93	−18.4%
1991	78	−16.1%
2001	63	−19.2%
2011	73	+15.9%
2021	75	+2.7%
Source: Censuses
