= Čečelovice =

- Municipality
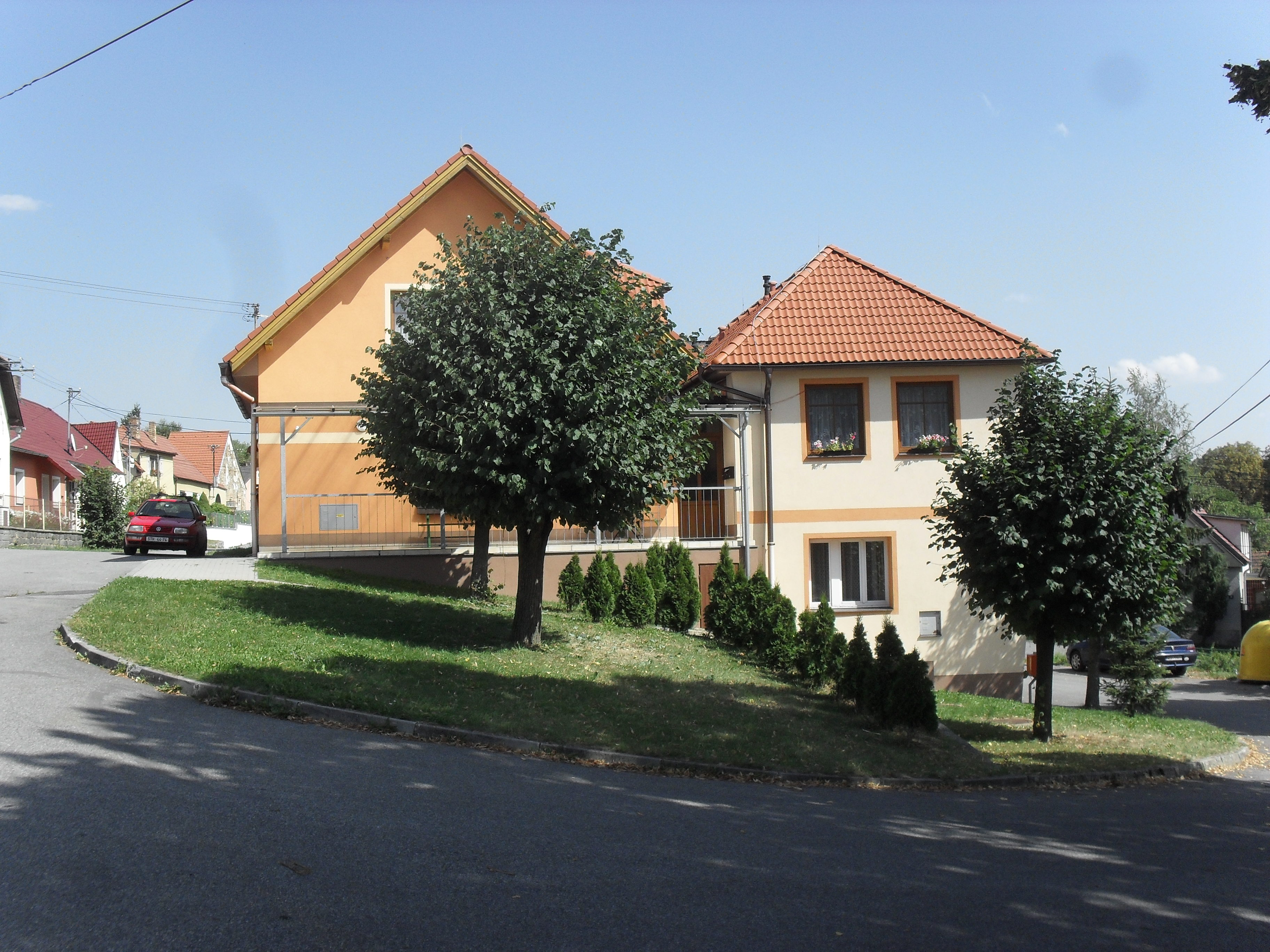
- Municipal office

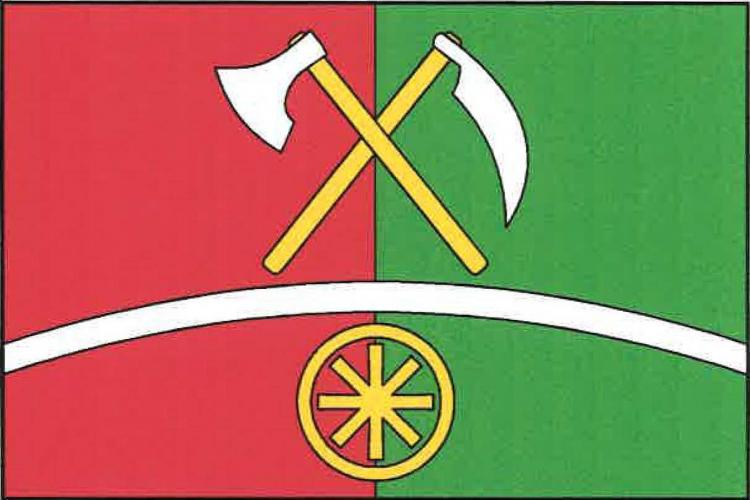
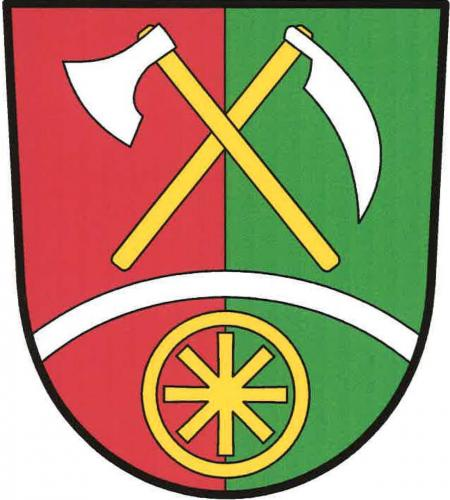
- Flag Coat of arms

- Location in the Czech Republic
- Coordinates: 49°22′27″N 13°47′42″E
- Country: Czech Republic
- Region: South Bohemian
- District: Strakonice
- First mentioned: 1412

Area
  - Total: 6.55 km^{2} (2.53 sq mi)
- Elevation: 554 m (1,818 ft)

Population (2026-01-01)
  - Total: 185
  - Density: 28.2/km^{2} (73.2/sq mi)
- Time zone: UTC+1 (CET)
  - Summer (DST): UTC+2 (CEST)
- Postal code: 388 01
- Website: www.cecelovice.cz

Čečelovice is a municipality and village in Strakonice District in the South Bohemian Region of the Czech Republic. It has about 200 inhabitants.

Čečelovice lies approximately 15 kilometres (9 mi) north-west of Strakonice, 66 km (41 mi) north-west of České Budějovice, and 92 km (57 mi) south-west of Prague.

== Demographics ==
Historical population
Year	Pop.	±%
1869	467	—
1880	478	+2.4%
1890	477	−0.2%
1900	444	−6.9%
1910	446	+0.5%
1921	462	+3.6%
1930	372	−19.5%
1950	280	−24.7%
1961	268	−4.3%
1970	232	−13.4%
1980	211	−9.1%
1991	180	−14.7%
2001	150	−16.7%
2011	163	+8.7%
2021	178	+9.2%
Source: Censuses
