= Měkynec =

- Municipality
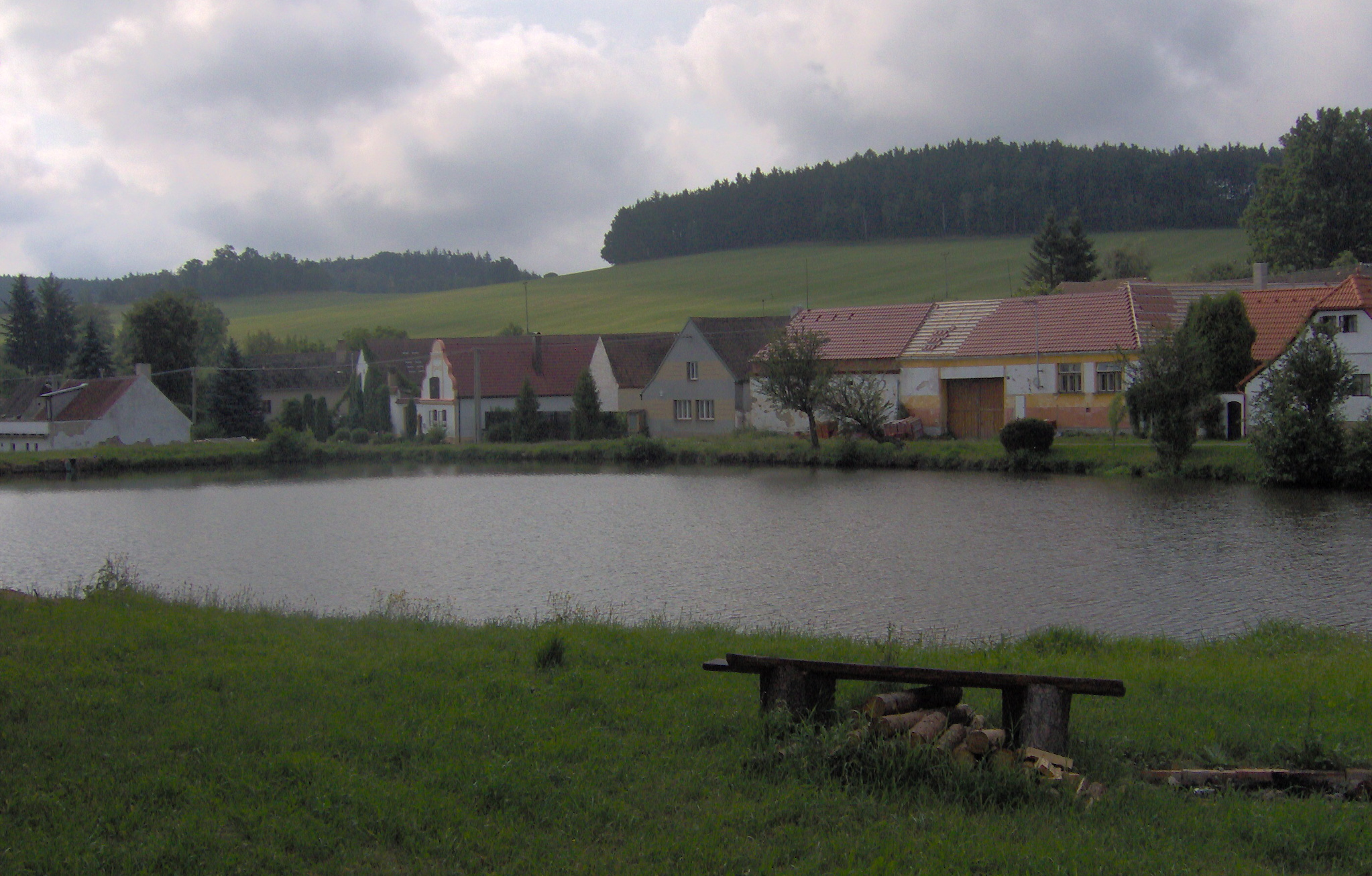
- Centre of Měkynec

- Location in the Czech Republic
- Coordinates: 49°9′30″N 14°1′46″E
- Country: Czech Republic
- Region: South Bohemian
- District: Strakonice
- First mentioned: 1334

Area
  - Total: 3.51 km^{2} (1.36 sq mi)
- Elevation: 519 m (1,703 ft)

Population (2026-01-01)
  - Total: 51
  - Density: 15/km^{2} (38/sq mi)
- Time zone: UTC+1 (CET)
  - Summer (DST): UTC+2 (CEST)
- Postal code: 387 73
- Website: www.mekynec.cz

Měkynec is a municipality and village in Strakonice District in the South Bohemian Region of the Czech Republic. It has about 50 inhabitants.

Měkynec lies approximately 15 kilometres (9 mi) south-east of Strakonice, 39 km (24 mi) north-west of České Budějovice, and 107 km (66 mi) south of Prague.

== Demographics ==
Historical population
Year	Pop.	±%
1869	241	—
1880	243	+0.8%
1890	250	+2.9%
1900	225	−10.0%
1910	215	−4.4%
1921	203	−5.6%
1930	156	−23.2%
1950	122	−21.8%
1961	101	−17.2%
1970	75	−25.7%
1980	40	−46.7%
1991	31	−22.5%
2001	28	−9.7%
2011	33	+17.9%
2021	46	+39.4%
Source: Censuses
