= Vacovice =

- Municipality
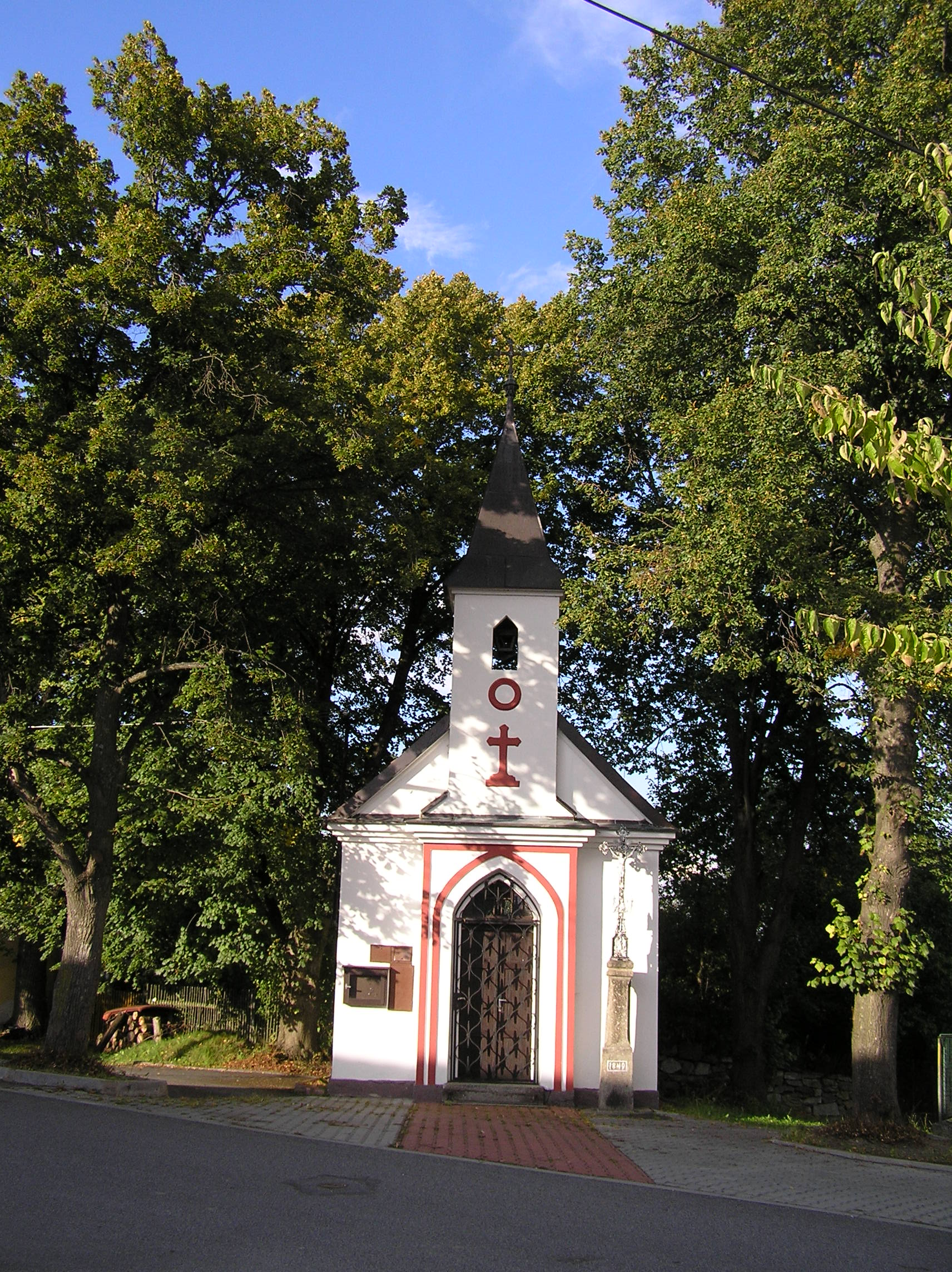
- Chapel of the Sacred Heart

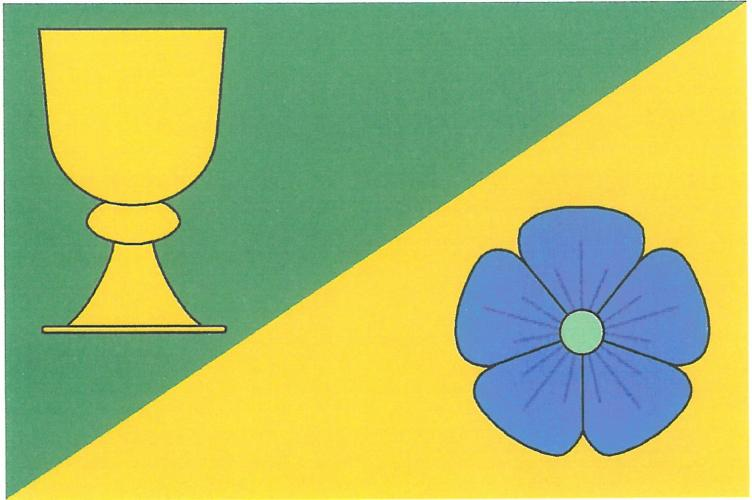
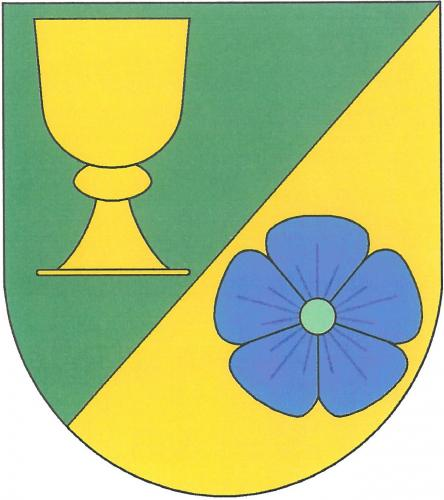
- Flag Coat of arms

- Location in the Czech Republic
- Coordinates: 49°8′26″N 13°46′51″E
- Country: Czech Republic
- Region: South Bohemian
- District: Strakonice
- First mentioned: 1467

Area
  - Total: 2.60 km^{2} (1.00 sq mi)
- Elevation: 706 m (2,316 ft)

Population (2026-01-01)
  - Total: 50
  - Density: 19/km^{2} (50/sq mi)
- Time zone: UTC+1 (CET)
  - Summer (DST): UTC+2 (CEST)
- Postal code: 387 19
- Website: www.obecvacovice.cz

Vacovice is a municipality and village in Strakonice District in the South Bohemian Region of the Czech Republic. It has about 50 inhabitants.

Vacovice lies approximately 16 kilometres (10 mi) south-west of Strakonice, 54 km (34 mi) west of České Budějovice, and 115 km (71 mi) south-west of Prague.

== Demographics ==
Historical population
Year	Pop.	±%
1869	229	—
1880	212	−7.4%
1890	215	+1.4%
1900	235	+9.3%
1910	234	−0.4%
1921	212	−9.4%
1930	230	+8.5%
1950	131	−43.0%
1961	145	+10.7%
1970	120	−17.2%
1980	100	−16.7%
1991	77	−23.0%
2001	73	−5.2%
2011	57	−21.9%
2021	42	−26.3%
Source: Censuses
