= Strakonice District =

Strakonice District Okres Strakonice
- District
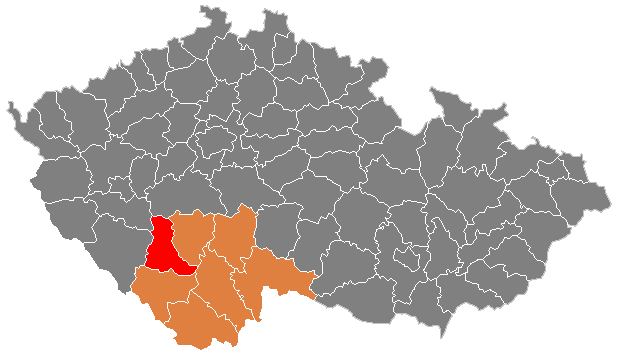
- Location in the South Bohemian Region within the Czech Republic
- Coordinates: 49°16′N 13°54′E
- Country: Czech Republic
- Region: South Bohemian
- Capital: Strakonice

Area
  - Total: 1,032.00 km^{2} (398.46 sq mi)

Population (2026)
  - Total: 71,636
  - Density: 69.415/km^{2} (179.78/sq mi)
- Time zone: UTC+1 (CET)
  - Summer (DST): UTC+2 (CEST)
- Municipalities: 112
- * Towns: 7
- * Market towns: 4

Strakonice District (Czech: okres Strakonice) is a district in the South Bohemian Region of the Czech Republic. Its capital is the town of Strakonice.

== Administrative division ==
Strakonice District is divided into three administrative districts of municipalities with extended competence: Strakonice, Blatná and Vodňany.

=== List of municipalities ===
Towns are marked in bold and market towns in italics:

Bavorov - Bělčice - Bezdědovice - Bílsko - Blatná - Bratronice - Březí - Budyně - Buzice - Čečelovice - Cehnice - Čejetice - Čepřovice - Čestice - Chelčice - Chlum - Chobot - Chrášťovice - Číčenice - Doubravice - Drachkov - Drahonice - Drážov - Dřešín - Droužetice - Hajany - Hájek - Hlupín - Horní Poříčí - Hornosín - Hoslovice - Hoštice - Jinín - Kadov - Kalenice - Katovice - Kladruby - Kocelovice - Krajníčko - Kraselov - Krašlovice - Krejnice - Krty-Hradec - Kuřimany - Kváskovice - Lažánky - Lažany - Libějovice - Libětice - Litochovice - Lnáře - Lom - Mačkov - Malenice - Mečichov - Měkynec - Milejovice - Miloňovice - Mnichov - Mutěnice - Myštice - Nebřehovice - Němčice - Němětice - Nihošovice - Nišovice - Nová Ves - Novosedly - Osek - Paračov - Pivkovice - Pohorovice - Pracejovice - Přechovice - Předmíř - Přední Zborovice - Předslavice - Přešťovice - Radějovice - Radomyšl - Radošovice - Řepice - Rovná - Sedlice - Skály - Skočice - Škvořetice - Slaník - Sousedovice - Štěchovice - Štěkeň - Stožice - Strakonice - Strašice - Střelské Hoštice - Strunkovice nad Volyňkou - Tchořovice - Třebohostice - Třešovice - Truskovice - Úlehle - Únice - Uzenice - Uzeničky - Vacovice - Velká Turná - Vodňany - Volenice - Volyně - Záboří - Zahorčice - Zvotoky

== Geography ==
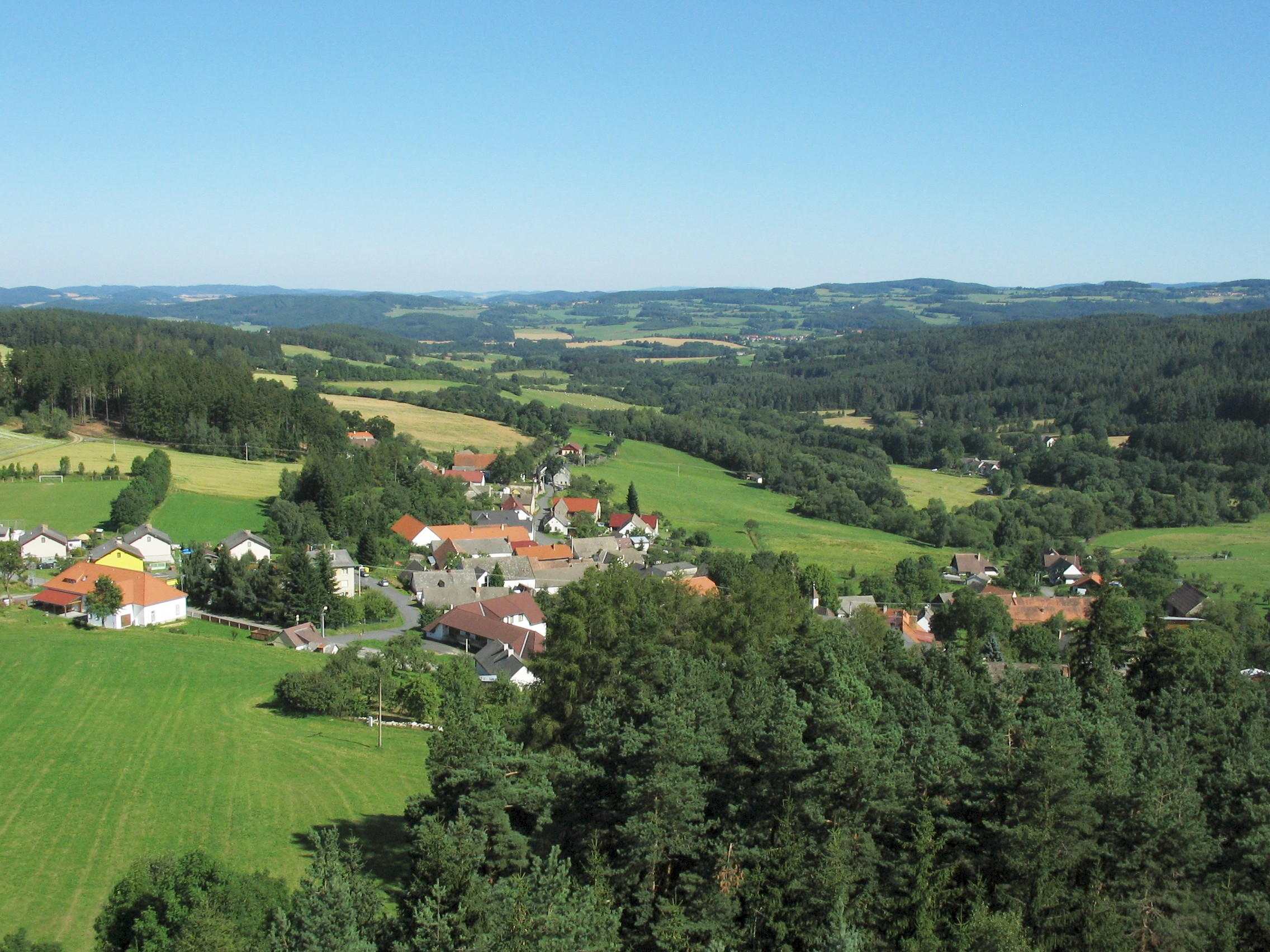
Hoslovice and surrounding landscape

Most of the territory is characterised by an undulating landscape with rolling hills; only the vicinity of the Otava River is flat. The territory extends into four geomorphological mesoregions: Blatná Uplands (north), Bohemian Forest Foothills (south), Benešov Uplands (northeast) and České Budějovice Basin (runs into the centre of the territory from the southeast). The highest point of the district is the hill Zahájený in Drážov with an elevation of 845 m (2,772 ft) and the lowest point is the river bed of the Otava in Čejetice at 372 m (1,220 ft).

From the total district area of 1,032.0 km^{2} (398.5 sq mi), agricultural land occupies 661.7 km^{2} (255.5 sq mi), forests occupy 235.8 km^{2} (91.0 sq mi), and water area occupies 40.3 km^{2} (15.6 sq mi). Forests cover 22.8% of the district's area.

The most important river is the Otava, which flows across the territory from west to east. The Lomnice River drains the northern part of the district and joins the Otava outside the district. The Blanice joins the Otava in the south of the district. The district is rich in fishponds, the largest of which is Labuť with an area of 101 ha (250 acres).

There are no large-scale protected areas.

== Demographics ==
Historical population

Year	Pop.	±%
1869	85,915	—
1880	89,727	+4.4%
1890	85,755	−4.4%
1900	85,083	−0.8%
1910	84,705	−0.4%

Year	Pop.	±%
1921	84,018	−0.8%
1930	81,597	−2.9%
1950	68,822	−15.7%
1961	71,192	+3.4%
1970	69,419	−2.5%

Year	Pop.	±%
1980	71,998	+3.7%
1991	71,978	−0.0%
2001	69,863	−2.9%
2011	69,786	−0.1%
2021	68,973	−1.2%

Source: Censuses

=== Most populous municipalities ===
Name	Population	Area (km^{2})
Strakonice	22,275	35
Vodňany	7,464	36
Blatná	6,679	44
Volyně	3,033	21
Bavorov	1,672	35
Radomyšl	1,359	25
Katovice	1,336	10
Sedlice	1,258	31
Bělčice	1,031	34
Čejetice	946	21

== Economy ==
The largest employers with headquarters in Strakonice District and at least 500 employees are:

Economic entity	Location	Number of employees	Main activity
Vodňanská drůbež	Vodňany	1,000–1,499	Food industry
Dura Automotive CZ	Blatná	500–999	Automotive industry
Strakonice Hospital	Strakonice	500–999	Health care

== Transport ==
There are no motorways in the district. The most important road is the I/20 road from Plzeň to České Budějovice, which is part of the European route E49.

== Sights ==
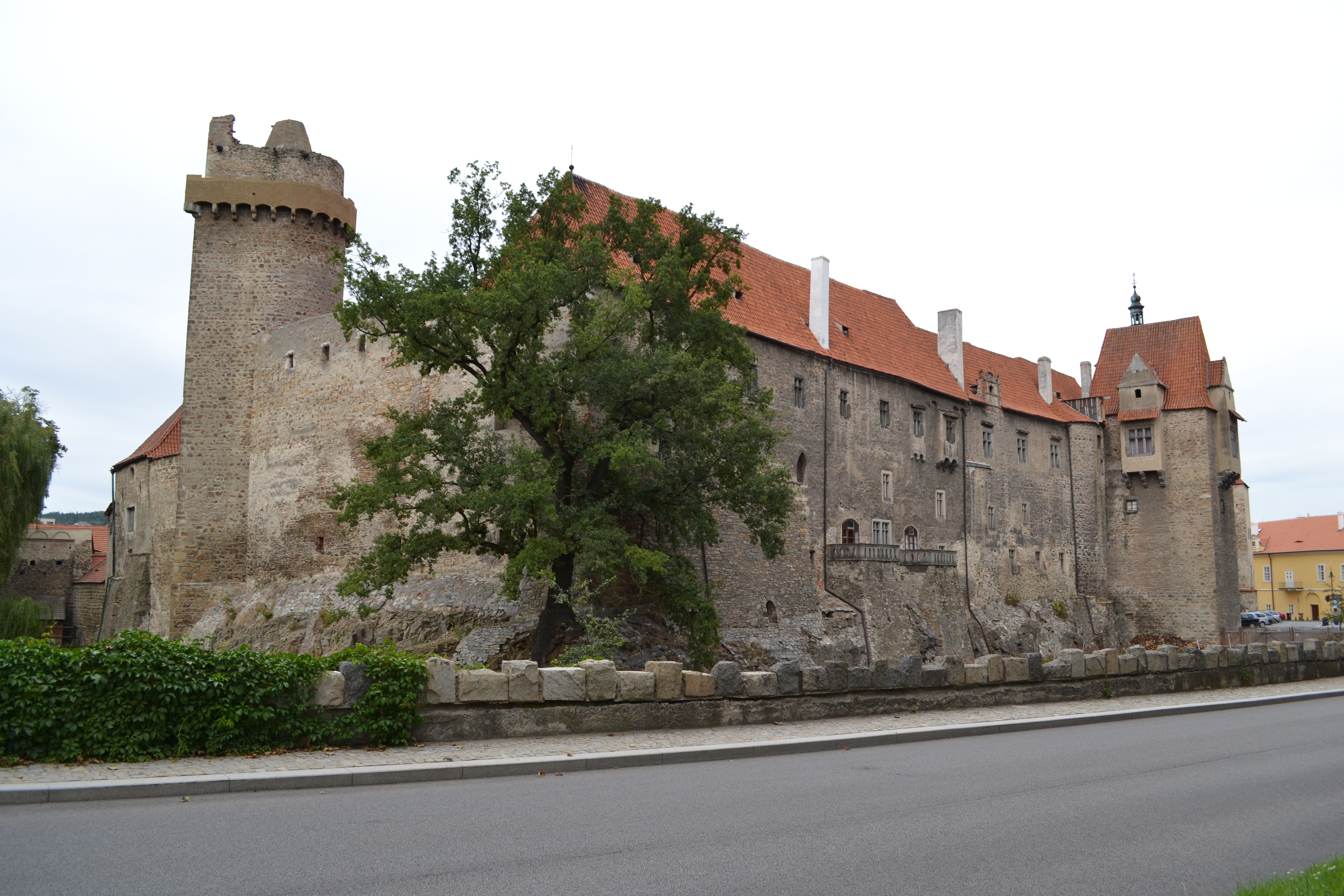
Strakonice Castle

The most important monuments in the district, protected as national cultural monuments, are:

- Strakonice Castle
- Watermill in Hoslovice

The best-preserved settlements and landscapes, protected as monument reservations and monument zones, are:

- Nahořany (monument reservation)
- Bavorov
- Blatná
- Sedlice
- Vodňany
- Volyně
- Jiřetice
- Kloub
- Koječín
- Křtětice
- Kváskovice
- Zechovice
- Libějovicko-Lomecko landscape

The most visited tourist destination is the Blatná Castle.
