= Pohorovice =

- Municipality
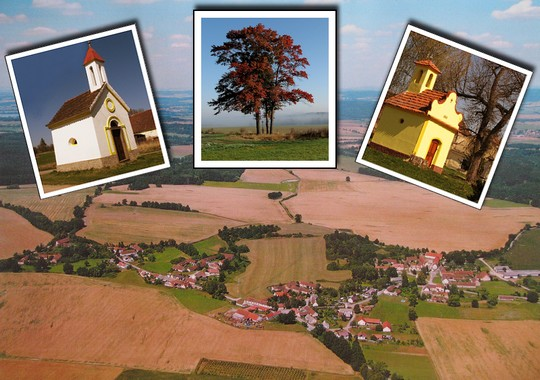
- Aerial view and chapels

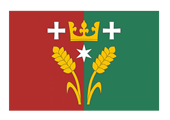
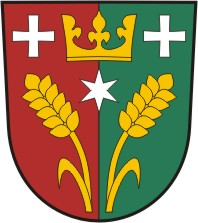
- Flag Coat of arms

- Location in the Czech Republic
- Coordinates: 49°11′19″N 14°8′6″E
- Country: Czech Republic
- Region: South Bohemian
- District: Strakonice
- First mentioned: 1227

Area
  - Total: 5.19 km^{2} (2.00 sq mi)
- Elevation: 418 m (1,371 ft)

Population (2026-01-01)
  - Total: 82
  - Density: 16/km^{2} (41/sq mi)
- Time zone: UTC+1 (CET)
  - Summer (DST): UTC+2 (CEST)
- Postal code: 389 01
- Website: www.pohorovice-kloub.cz

Pohorovice is a municipality and village in Strakonice District in the South Bohemian Region of the Czech Republic. It has about 80 inhabitants.

Pohorovice lies approximately 19 kilometres (12 mi) south-east of Strakonice, 35 km (22 mi) north-west of České Budějovice, and 102 km (63 mi) south of Prague.

== Administrative division ==
Pohorovice consists of two municipal parts (in brackets population according to the 2021 census):

- Pohorovice (45)
- Kloub (39)

== Demographics ==
Historical population
Year	Pop.	±%
1869	371	—
1880	347	−6.5%
1890	370	+6.6%
1900	340	−8.1%
1910	350	+2.9%
1921	350	+0.0%
1930	332	−5.1%
1950	192	−42.2%
1961	155	−19.3%
1970	134	−13.5%
1980	87	−35.1%
1991	86	−1.1%
2001	79	−8.1%
2011	72	−8.9%
2021	84	+16.7%
Source: Censuses
