= Paračov =

- Municipality
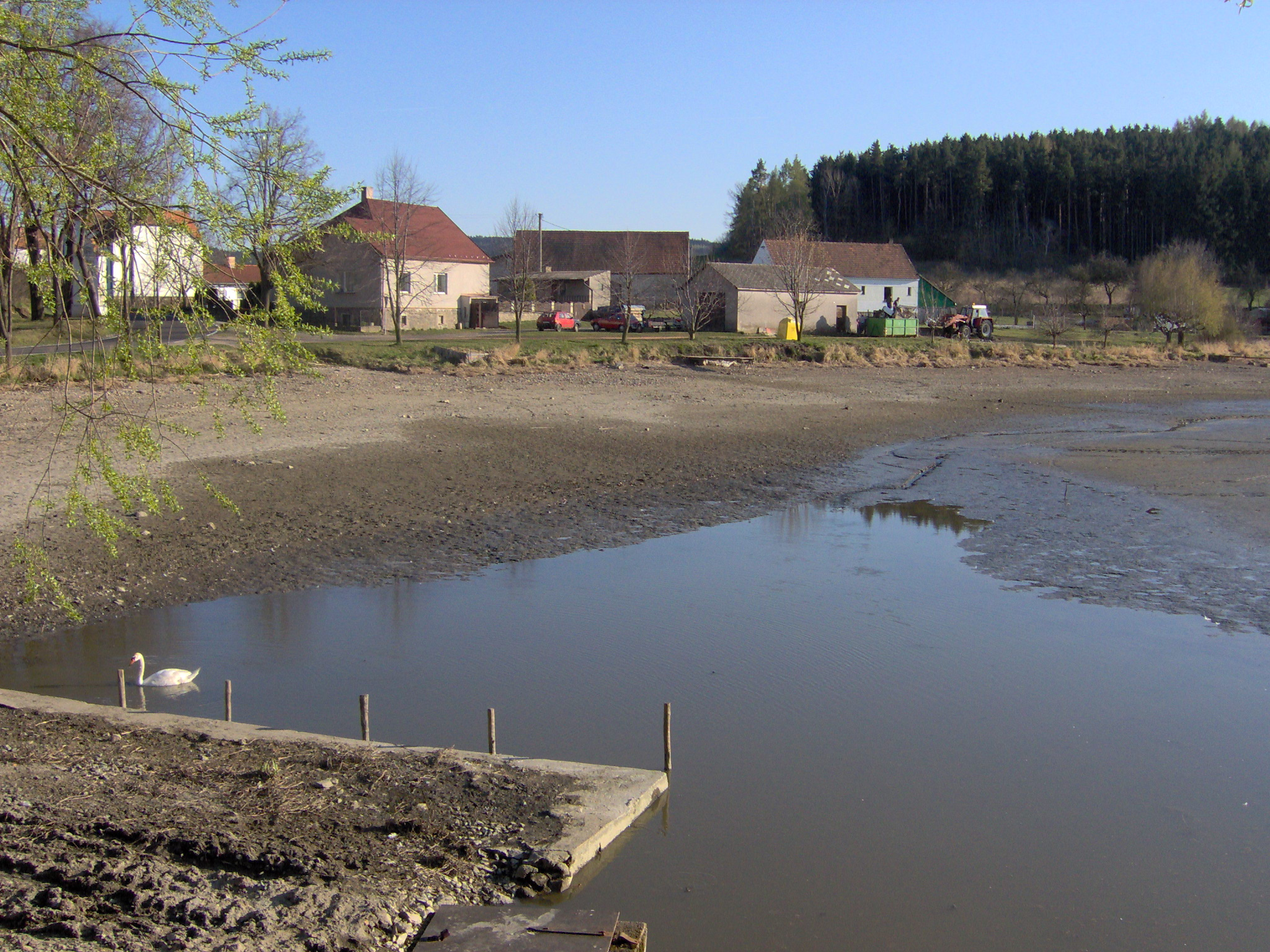
- Pond in Paračov

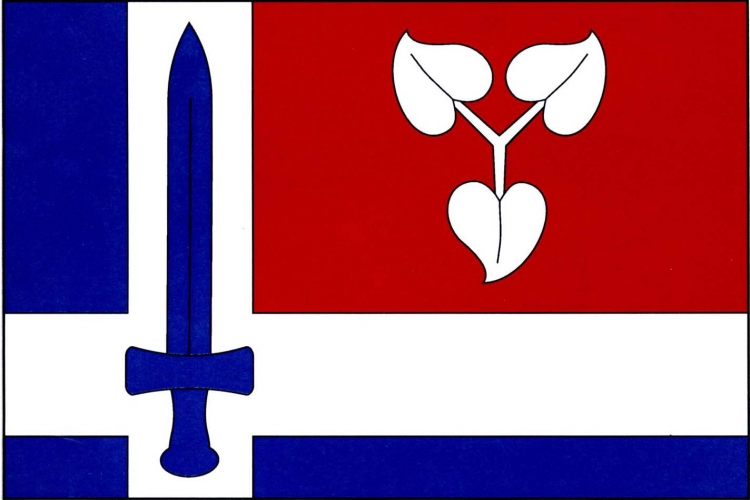
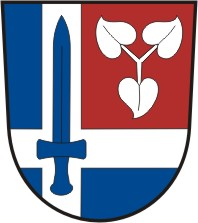
- Flag Coat of arms

- Location in the Czech Republic
- Coordinates: 49°12′4″N 13°59′41″E
- Country: Czech Republic
- Region: South Bohemian
- District: Strakonice
- First mentioned: 1316

Area
  - Total: 4.58 km^{2} (1.77 sq mi)
- Elevation: 482 m (1,581 ft)

Population (2026-01-01)
  - Total: 107
  - Density: 23.4/km^{2} (60.5/sq mi)
- Time zone: UTC+1 (CET)
  - Summer (DST): UTC+2 (CEST)
- Postal code: 386 01
- Website: www.obecparacov.cz

Paračov is a municipality and village in Strakonice District in the South Bohemian Region of the Czech Republic. It has about 100 inhabitants.

Paračov lies approximately 10 kilometres (6 mi) south-east of Strakonice, 43 km (27 mi) north-west of České Budějovice, and 104 km (65 mi) south of Prague.

== Demographics ==
Historical population
Year	Pop.	±%
1869	343	—
1880	355	+3.5%
1890	337	−5.1%
1900	353	+4.7%
1910	295	−16.4%
1921	302	+2.4%
1930	264	−12.6%
1950	223	−15.5%
1961	200	−10.3%
1970	147	−26.5%
1980	123	−16.3%
1991	97	−21.1%
2001	90	−7.2%
2011	106	+17.8%
2021	108	+1.9%
Source: Censuses
