= Řepice =

- Municipality
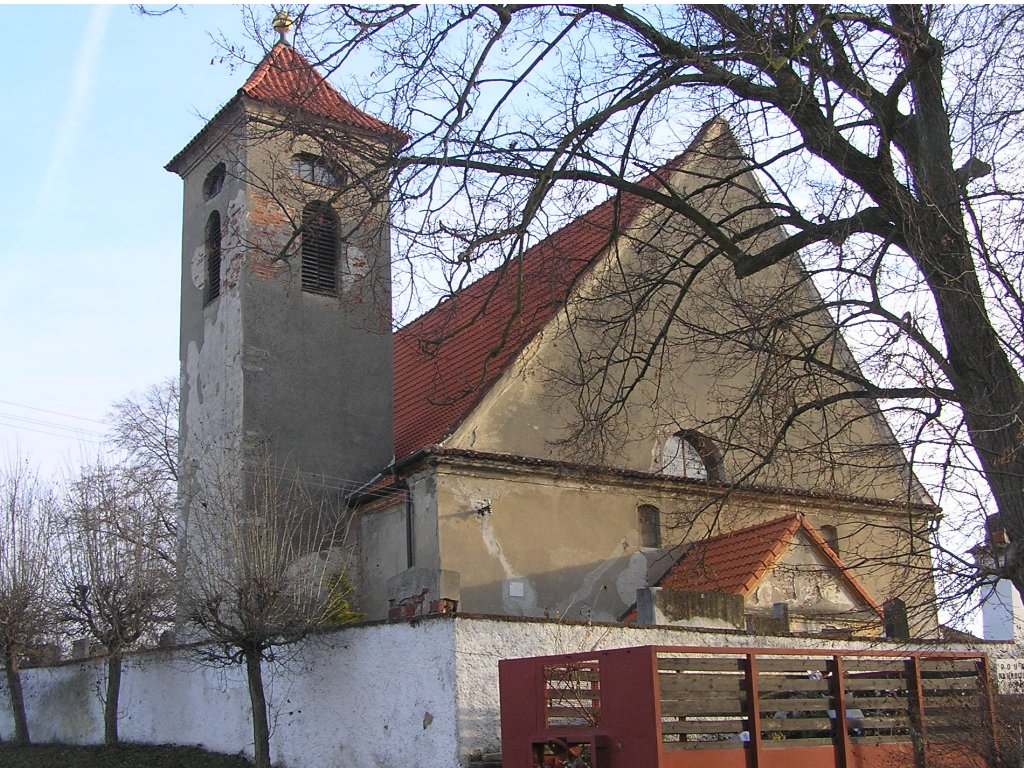
- Church of Saint Mary Magdalene

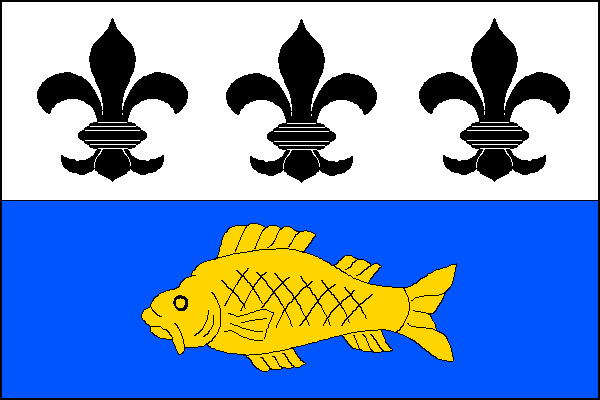
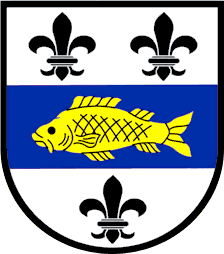
- Flag Coat of arms

- Location in the Czech Republic
- Coordinates: 49°16′50″N 13°56′0″E
- Country: Czech Republic
- Region: South Bohemian
- District: Strakonice
- First mentioned: 1251

Area
  - Total: 4.28 km^{2} (1.65 sq mi)
- Elevation: 423 m (1,388 ft)

Population (2026-01-01)
  - Total: 447
  - Density: 104/km^{2} (270/sq mi)
- Time zone: UTC+1 (CET)
  - Summer (DST): UTC+2 (CEST)
- Postal code: 386 01
- Website: www.repice.cz

Řepice (German: Repitz) is a municipality and village in Strakonice District in the South Bohemian Region of the Czech Republic. It has about 400 inhabitants.

Řepice lies approximately 4 kilometres (2 mi) north-east of Strakonice, 53 km (33 mi) north-west of České Budějovice, and 97 km (60 mi) south of Prague.

== Demographics ==
Historical population
| Year | Pop. | ±% |
|---|---|---|
| 1869 | 354 | — |
| 1880 | 417 | +17.8% |
| 1890 | 363 | −12.9% |
| 1900 | 316 | −12.9% |
| 1910 | 334 | +5.7% |
| 1921 | 358 | +7.2% |
| 1930 | 335 | −6.4% |
| 1950 | 293 | −12.5% |
| 1961 | 314 | +7.2% |
| 1970 | 311 | −1.0% |
| 1980 | 290 | −6.8% |
| 1991 | 235 | −19.0% |
| 2001 | 292 | +24.3% |
| 2011 | 455 | +55.8% |
| 2021 | 461 | +1.3% |
Source: Censuses
