= Chrášťovice =

- Municipality
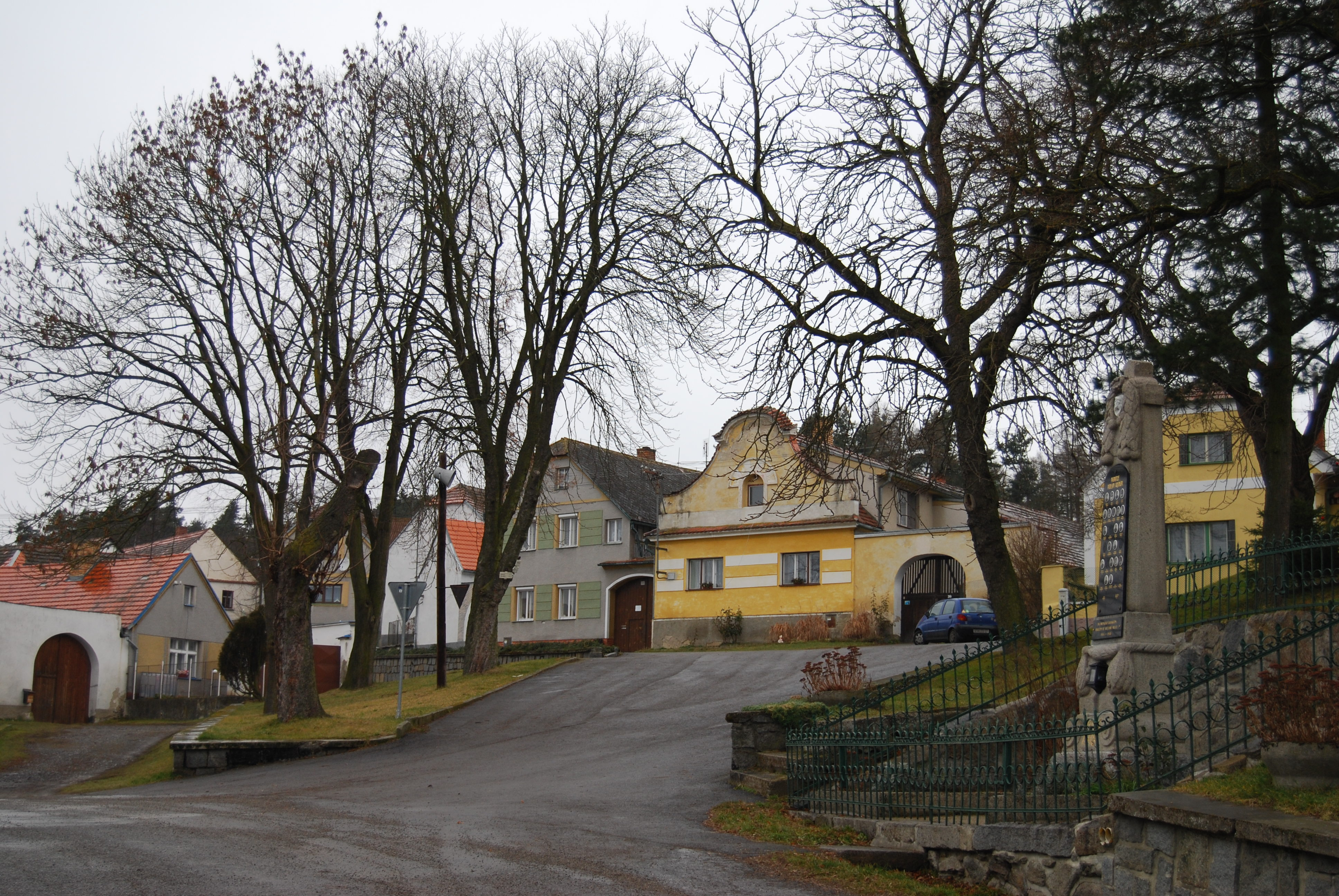
- Centre of Chrášťovice

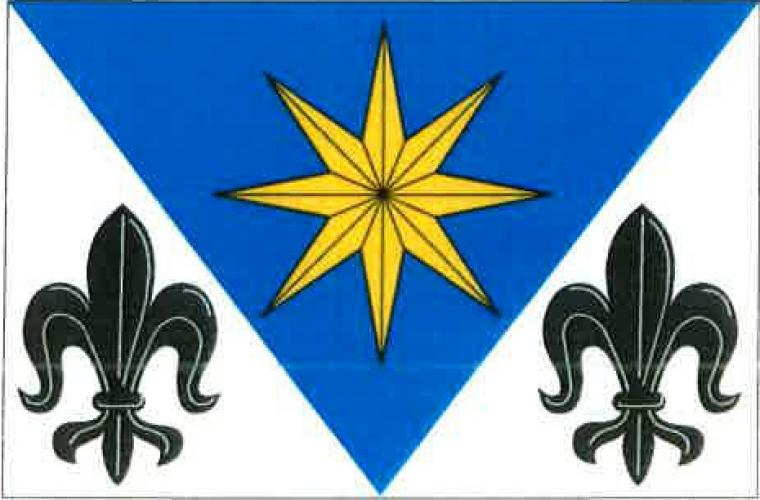
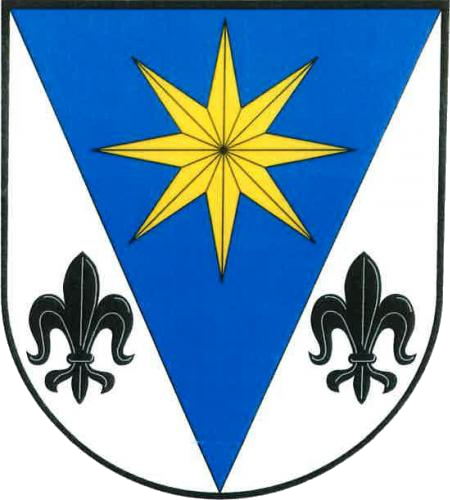
- Flag Coat of arms

- Location in the Czech Republic
- Coordinates: 49°20′0″N 13°53′49″E
- Country: Czech Republic
- Region: South Bohemian
- District: Strakonice
- First mentioned: 1544

Area
  - Total: 10.72 km^{2} (4.14 sq mi)
- Elevation: 525 m (1,722 ft)

Population (2026-01-01)
  - Total: 270
  - Density: 25/km^{2} (65/sq mi)
- Time zone: UTC+1 (CET)
  - Summer (DST): UTC+2 (CEST)
- Postal code: 386 01
- Website: www.chrastovice.cz

Chrášťovice is a municipality and village in Strakonice District in the South Bohemian Region of the Czech Republic. It has about 300 inhabitants.

Chrášťovice lies approximately 9 kilometres (6 mi) north of Strakonice, 59 km (37 mi) north-west of České Budějovice, and 92 km (57 mi) south-west of Prague.

== Administrative division ==
Chrášťovice consists of two municipal parts (in brackets population according to the 2021 census):

- Chrášťovice (219)
- Klínovice (49)

== Demographics ==
Historical population
Year	Pop.	±%
1869	615	—
1880	622	+1.1%
1890	597	−4.0%
1900	681	+14.1%
1910	658	−3.4%
1921	651	−1.1%
1930	622	−4.5%
1950	483	−22.3%
1961	459	−5.0%
1970	374	−18.5%
1980	318	−15.0%
1991	248	−22.0%
2001	255	+2.8%
2011	242	−5.1%
2021	268	+10.7%
Source: Censuses
