= Úlehle =

- Municipality
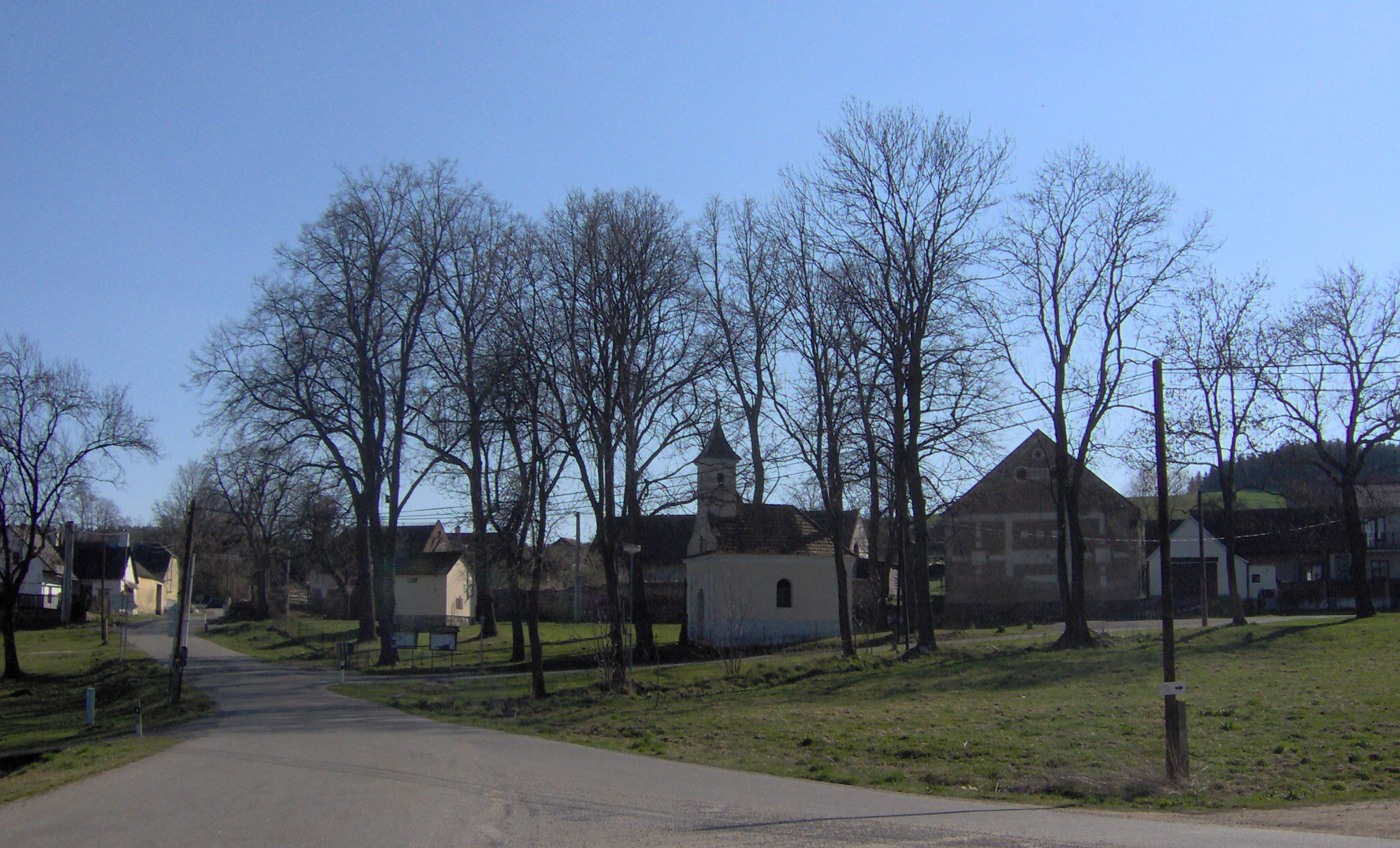
- Radkovice, a part of Úlehle

- Location in the Czech Republic
- Coordinates: 49°12′6″N 13°50′18″E
- Country: Czech Republic
- Region: South Bohemian
- District: Strakonice
- First mentioned: 1318

Area
  - Total: 6.56 km^{2} (2.53 sq mi)
- Elevation: 513 m (1,683 ft)

Population (2026-01-01)
  - Total: 92
  - Density: 14/km^{2} (36/sq mi)
- Time zone: UTC+1 (CET)
  - Summer (DST): UTC+2 (CEST)
- Postal codes: 386 01, 387 19
- Website: www.obeculehle.info

Úlehle is a municipality and village in Strakonice District in the South Bohemian Region of the Czech Republic. It has about 90 inhabitants.

Úlehle lies approximately 8 kilometres (5 mi) south-west of Strakonice, 53 km (33 mi) north-west of České Budějovice, and 107 km (66 mi) south-west of Prague.

== Administrative division ==
Úlehle consists of three municipal parts (in brackets population according to the 2021 census):

- Úlehle (46)
- Radkovice (34)
- Švejcarova Lhota (18)

== Demographics ==
Historical population
Year	Pop.	±%
1869	380	—
1880	359	−5.5%
1890	337	−6.1%
1900	366	+8.6%
1910	359	−1.9%
1921	377	+5.0%
1930	353	−6.4%
1950	270	−23.5%
1961	245	−9.3%
1970	213	−13.1%
1980	187	−12.2%
1991	130	−30.5%
2001	126	−3.1%
2011	100	−20.6%
2021	98	−2.0%
Source: Censuses
