= Krašlovice =

- Municipality
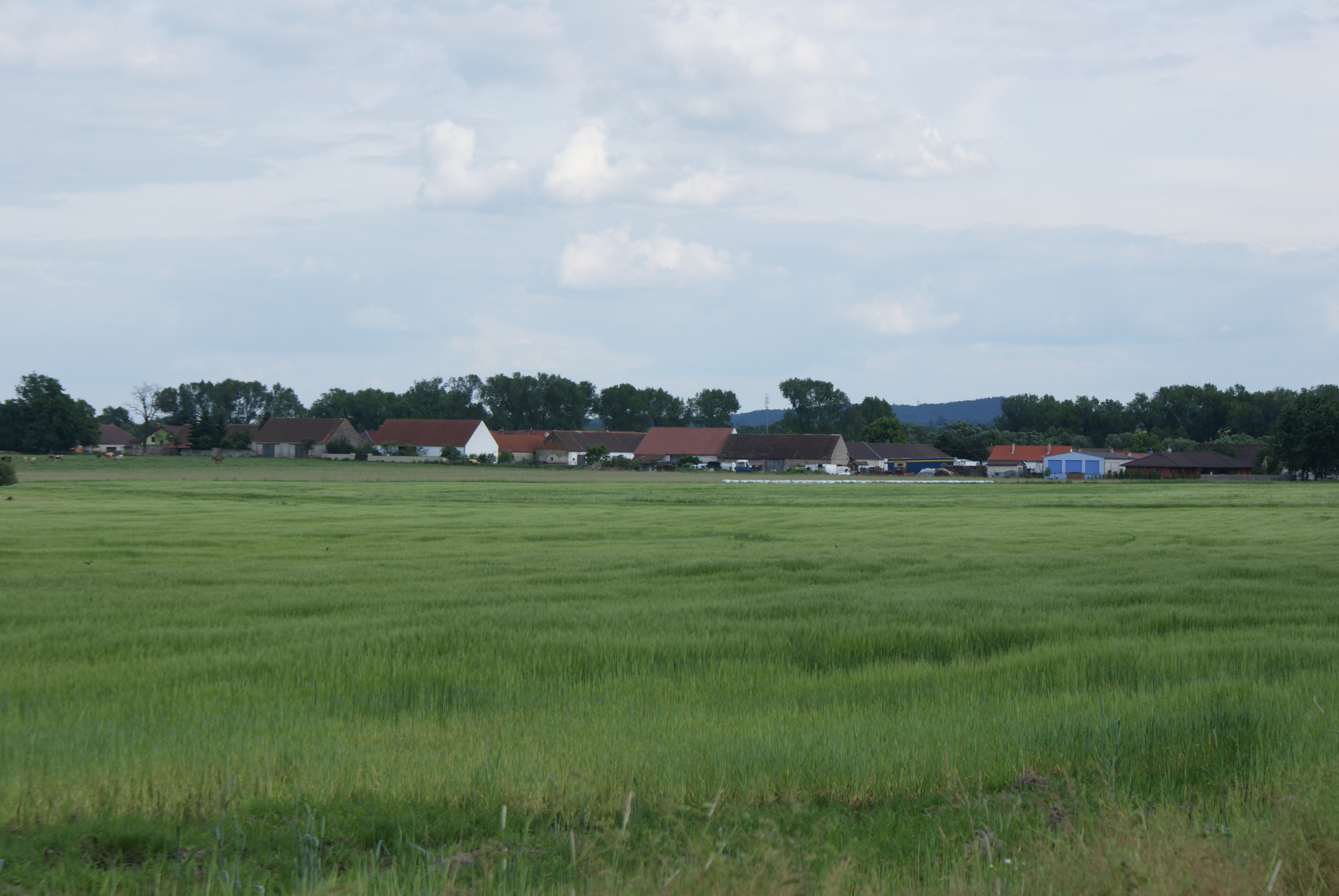
- General view

- Location in the Czech Republic
- Coordinates: 49°10′0″N 14°7′57″E
- Country: Czech Republic
- Region: South Bohemian
- District: Strakonice
- First mentioned: 1262

Area
  - Total: 5.31 km^{2} (2.05 sq mi)
- Elevation: 398 m (1,306 ft)

Population (2026-01-01)
  - Total: 172
  - Density: 32.4/km^{2} (83.9/sq mi)
- Time zone: UTC+1 (CET)
  - Summer (DST): UTC+2 (CEST)
- Postal code: 389 01
- Website: www.kraslovice.cz

Krašlovice is a municipality and village in Strakonice District in the South Bohemian Region of the Czech Republic. It has about 200 inhabitants.

Krašlovice lies approximately 20 kilometres (12 mi) south-east of Strakonice, 33 km (21 mi) north-west of České Budějovice, and 105 km (65 mi) south of Prague.

== Administrative division ==
Krašlovice consists of two municipal parts (in brackets population according to the 2021 census):

- Krašlovice (109)
- Vitice (32)

== Demographics ==
Historical population
Year	Pop.	±%
1869	375	—
1880	359	−4.3%
1890	327	−8.9%
1900	338	+3.4%
1910	329	−2.7%
1921	318	−3.3%
1930	325	+2.2%
1950	218	−32.9%
1961	195	−10.6%
1970	152	−22.1%
1980	177	+16.4%
1991	180	+1.7%
2001	137	−23.9%
2011	149	+8.8%
2021	141	−5.4%
Source: Censuses
