= Dřešín =

- Municipality
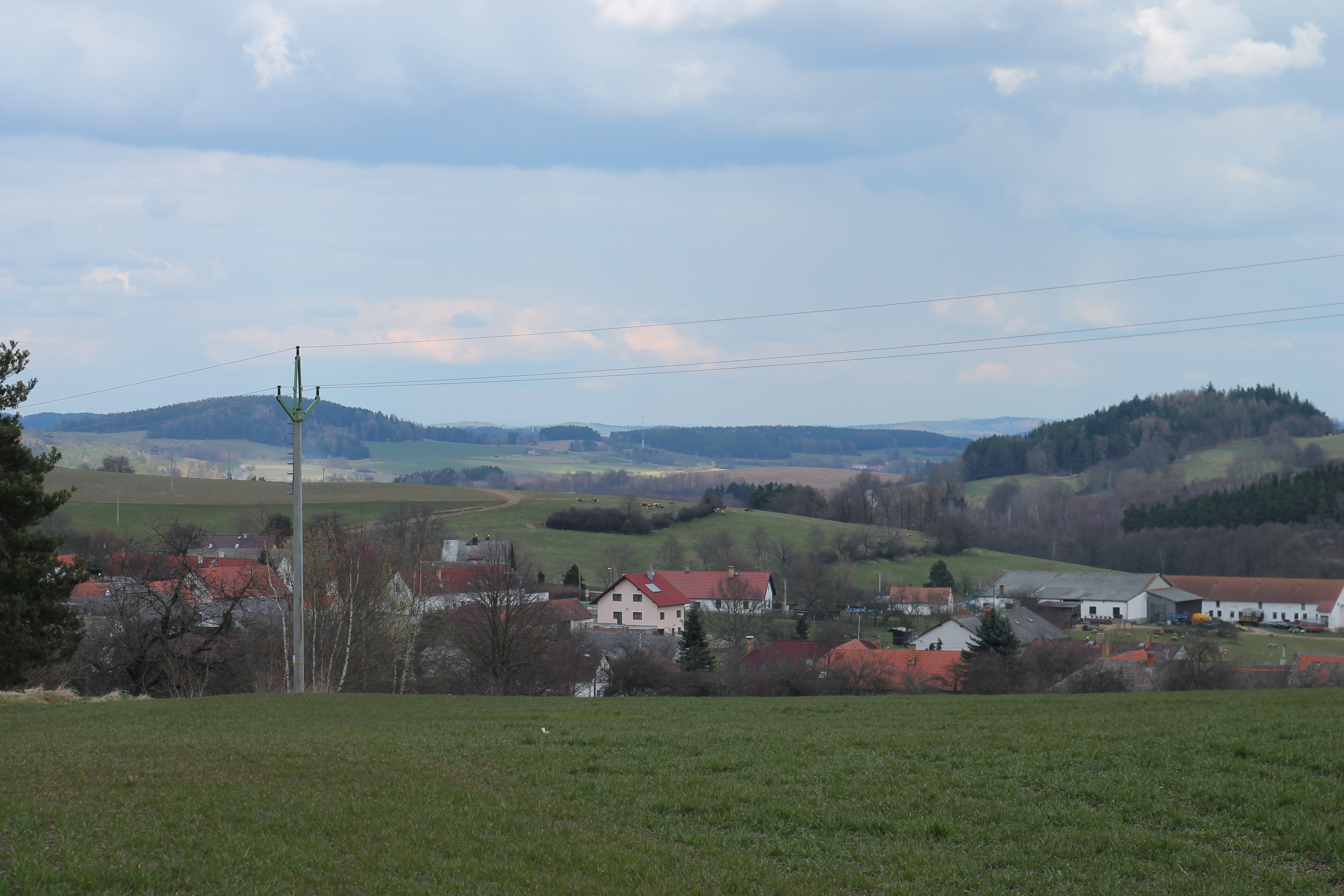
- View from the west

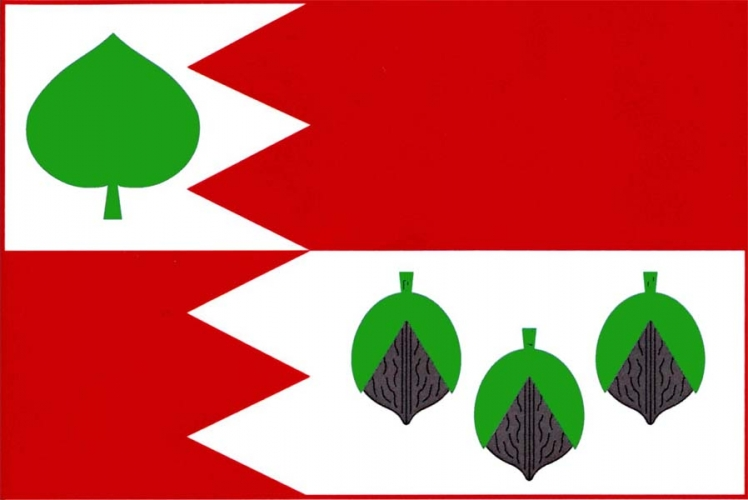
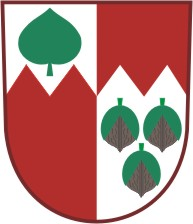
- Flag Coat of arms

- Location in the Czech Republic
- Coordinates: 49°9′40″N 13°46′32″E
- Country: Czech Republic
- Region: South Bohemian
- District: Strakonice
- First mentioned: 1407

Area
  - Total: 8.92 km^{2} (3.44 sq mi)
- Elevation: 575 m (1,886 ft)

Population (2026-01-01)
  - Total: 321
  - Density: 36.0/km^{2} (93.2/sq mi)
- Time zone: UTC+1 (CET)
  - Summer (DST): UTC+2 (CEST)
- Postal code: 387 19
- Website: www.dresin.cz

Dřešín is a municipality and village in Strakonice District in the South Bohemian Region of the Czech Republic. It has about 300 inhabitants.

Dřešín lies approximately 15 kilometres (9 mi) south-west of Strakonice, 56 km (35 mi) west of České Budějovice, and 114 km (71 mi) south-west of Prague.

== Administrative division ==
Dřešín consists of four municipal parts (in brackets population according to the 2021 census):

- Dřešín (186)
- Chvalšovice (70)
- Dřešínek (29)
- Hořejšice (19)

== Demographics ==
Historical population
Year	Pop.	±%
1869	788	—
1880	782	−0.8%
1890	677	−13.4%
1900	740	+9.3%
1910	760	+2.7%
1921	681	−10.4%
1930	658	−3.4%
1950	471	−28.4%
1961	445	−5.5%
1970	358	−19.6%
1980	314	−12.3%
1991	272	−13.4%
2001	265	−2.6%
2011	310	+17.0%
2021	304	−1.9%
Source: Censuses
