= Mečichov =

- Municipality
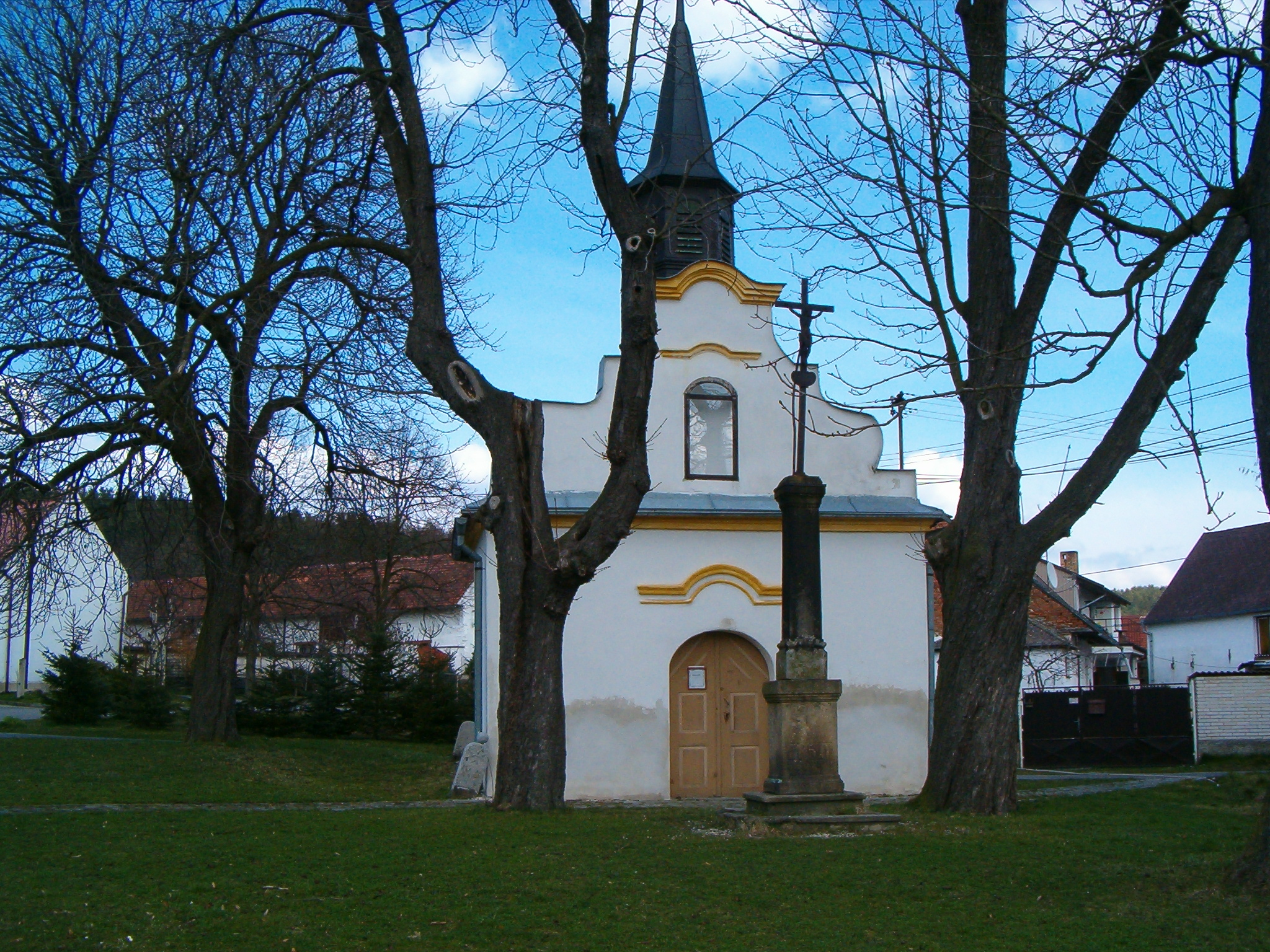
- Chapel of Saint Adalbert

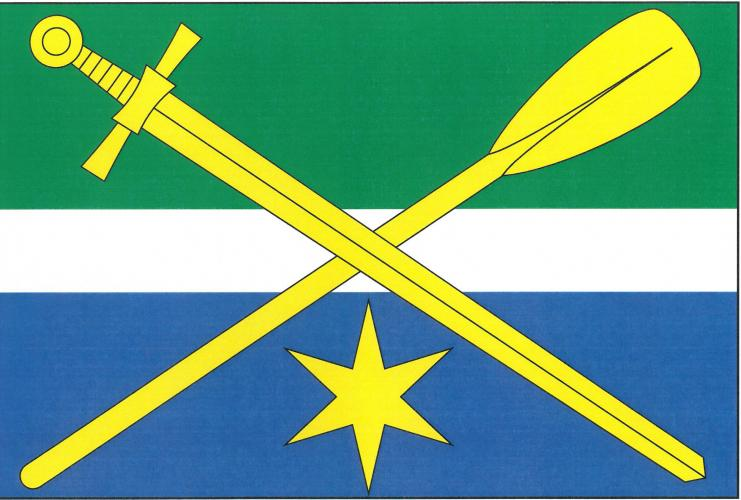
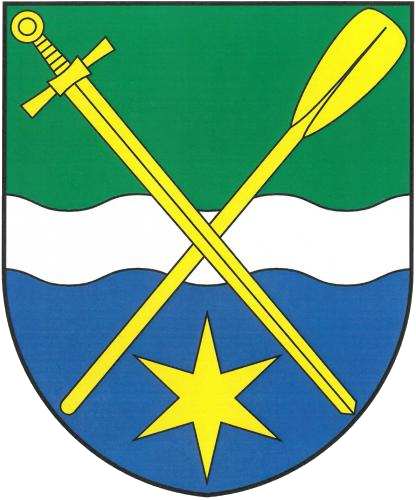
- Flag Coat of arms

- Location in the Czech Republic
- Coordinates: 49°20′52″N 13°48′43″E
- Country: Czech Republic
- Region: South Bohemian
- District: Strakonice
- First mentioned: 1539

Area
  - Total: 8.86 km^{2} (3.42 sq mi)
- Elevation: 494 m (1,621 ft)

Population (2026-01-01)
  - Total: 286
  - Density: 32.3/km^{2} (83.6/sq mi)
- Time zone: UTC+1 (CET)
  - Summer (DST): UTC+2 (CEST)
- Postal code: 387 36
- Website: mecichov.cz

Mečichov is a municipality and village in Strakonice District in the South Bohemian Region of the Czech Republic. It has about 300 inhabitants.

Mečichov lies approximately 13 kilometres (8 mi) north-west of Strakonice, 65 km (40 mi) north-west of České Budějovice, and 94 km (58 mi) south-west of Prague.

== Demographics ==
Historical population
Year	Pop.	±%
1869	511	—
1880	580	+13.5%
1890	555	−4.3%
1900	551	−0.7%
1910	542	−1.6%
1921	565	+4.2%
1930	509	−9.9%
1950	400	−21.4%
1961	379	−5.2%
1970	335	−11.6%
1980	330	−1.5%
1991	283	−14.2%
2001	246	−13.1%
2011	249	+1.2%
2021	272	+9.2%
Source: Censuses
