= Droužetice =

- Municipality
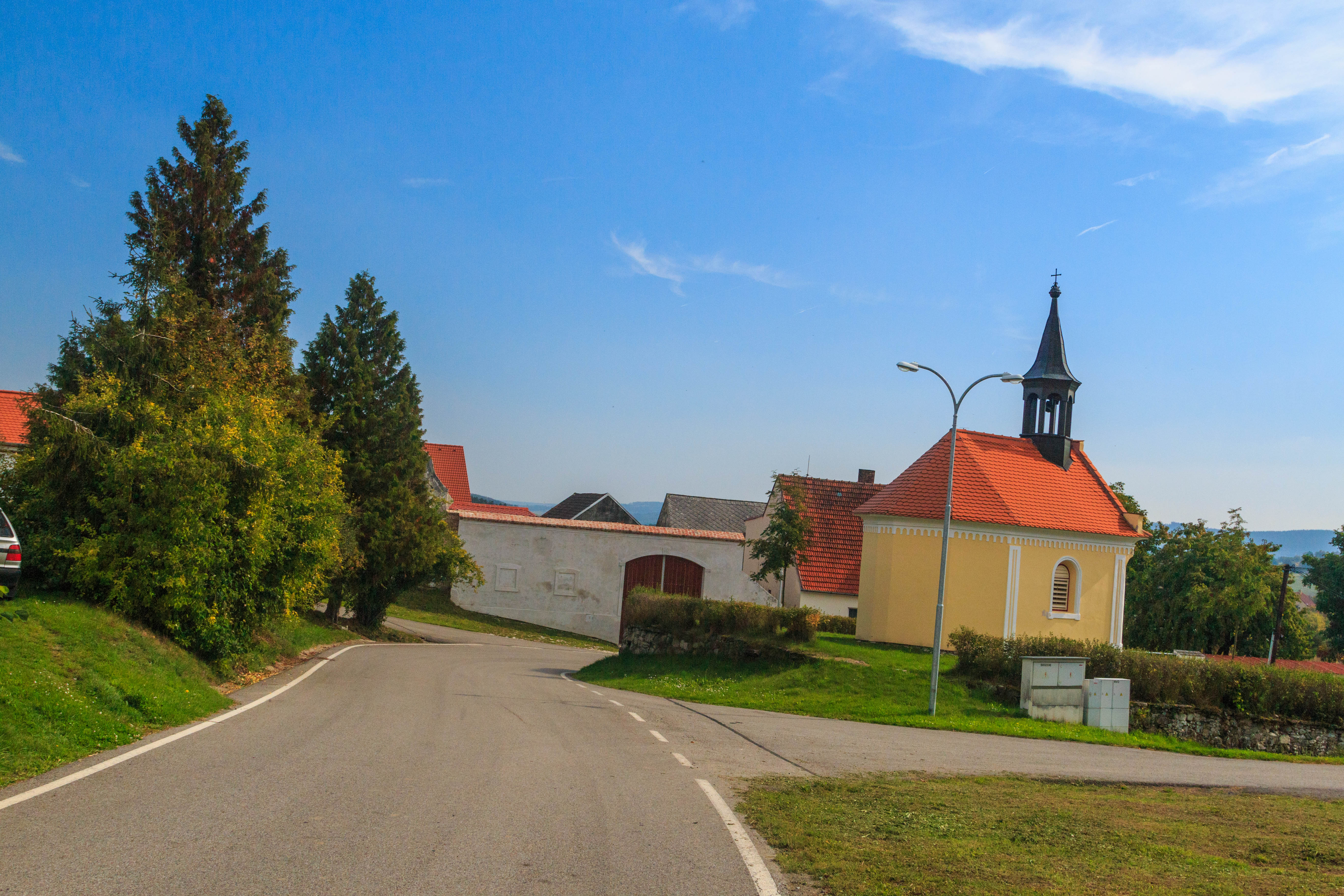
- Chapel in the centre of Droužetice

- Flag Coat of arms

- Location in the Czech Republic
- Coordinates: 49°17′21″N 13°53′53″E
- Country: Czech Republic
- Region: South Bohemian
- District: Strakonice
- First mentioned: 1227

Area
  - Total: 5.21 km^{2} (2.01 sq mi)
- Elevation: 440 m (1,440 ft)

Population (2026-01-01)
  - Total: 132
  - Density: 25.3/km^{2} (65.6/sq mi)
- Time zone: UTC+1 (CET)
  - Summer (DST): UTC+2 (CEST)
- Postal code: 386 01
- Website: www.drouzetice.cz

Droužetice is a municipality and village in Strakonice District in the South Bohemian Region of the Czech Republic. It has about 100 inhabitants.

Droužetice lies approximately 4 kilometres (2 mi) north of Strakonice, 55 km (34 mi) north-west of České Budějovice, and 97 km (60 mi) south-west of Prague.

== Administrative division ==
Droužetice consists of two municipal parts (in brackets population according to the 2021 census):

- Droužetice (114)
- Černíkov (22)

== Demographics ==
Historical population
| Year | Pop. | ±% |
|---|---|---|
| 1869 | 277 | — |
| 1880 | 281 | +1.4% |
| 1890 | 244 | −13.2% |
| 1900 | 247 | +1.2% |
| 1910 | 265 | +7.3% |
| 1921 | 248 | −6.4% |
| 1930 | 243 | −2.0% |
| 1950 | 185 | −23.9% |
| 1961 | 174 | −5.9% |
| 1970 | 166 | −4.6% |
| 1980 | 127 | −23.5% |
| 1991 | 116 | −8.7% |
| 2001 | 107 | −7.8% |
| 2011 | 101 | −5.6% |
| 2021 | 136 | +34.7% |
Source: Censuses
