= Zahorčice =

- Municipality
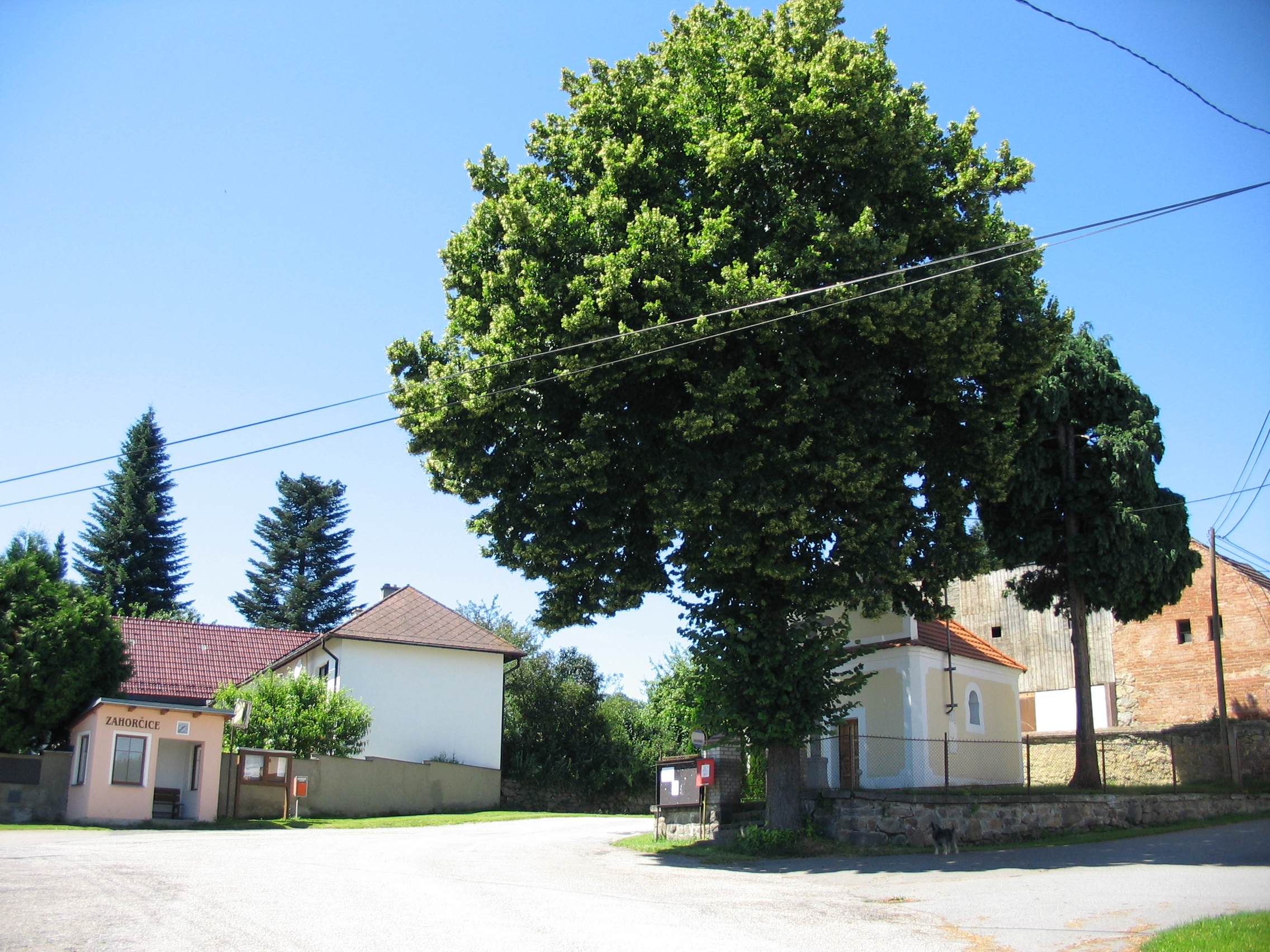
- Centre of Zahorčice

- Location in the Czech Republic
- Coordinates: 49°12′31″N 13°49′3″E
- Country: Czech Republic
- Region: South Bohemian
- District: Strakonice
- First mentioned: 1227

Area
  - Total: 3.63 km^{2} (1.40 sq mi)
- Elevation: 603 m (1,978 ft)

Population (2026-01-01)
  - Total: 51
  - Density: 14/km^{2} (36/sq mi)
- Time zone: UTC+1 (CET)
  - Summer (DST): UTC+2 (CEST)
- Postal code: 387 19
- Website: www.obeczahorcice.cz

Zahorčice is a municipality and village in Strakonice District in the South Bohemian Region of the Czech Republic. It has about 50 inhabitants.

Zahorčice lies approximately 9 kilometres (6 mi) south-west of Strakonice, 55 km (34 mi) north-west of České Budějovice, and 107 km (66 mi) south-west of Prague.

== Demographics ==
Historical population
| Year | Pop. | ±% |
|---|---|---|
| 1869 | 244 | — |
| 1880 | 278 | +13.9% |
| 1890 | 293 | +5.4% |
| 1900 | 260 | −11.3% |
| 1910 | 279 | +7.3% |
| 1921 | 282 | +1.1% |
| 1930 | 229 | −18.8% |
| 1950 | 174 | −24.0% |
| 1961 | 170 | −2.3% |
| 1970 | 133 | −21.8% |
| 1980 | 105 | −21.1% |
| 1991 | 81 | −22.9% |
| 2001 | 78 | −3.7% |
| 2011 | 72 | −7.7% |
| 2021 | 43 | −40.3% |
Source: Censuses
