= Hlupín =

- Municipality
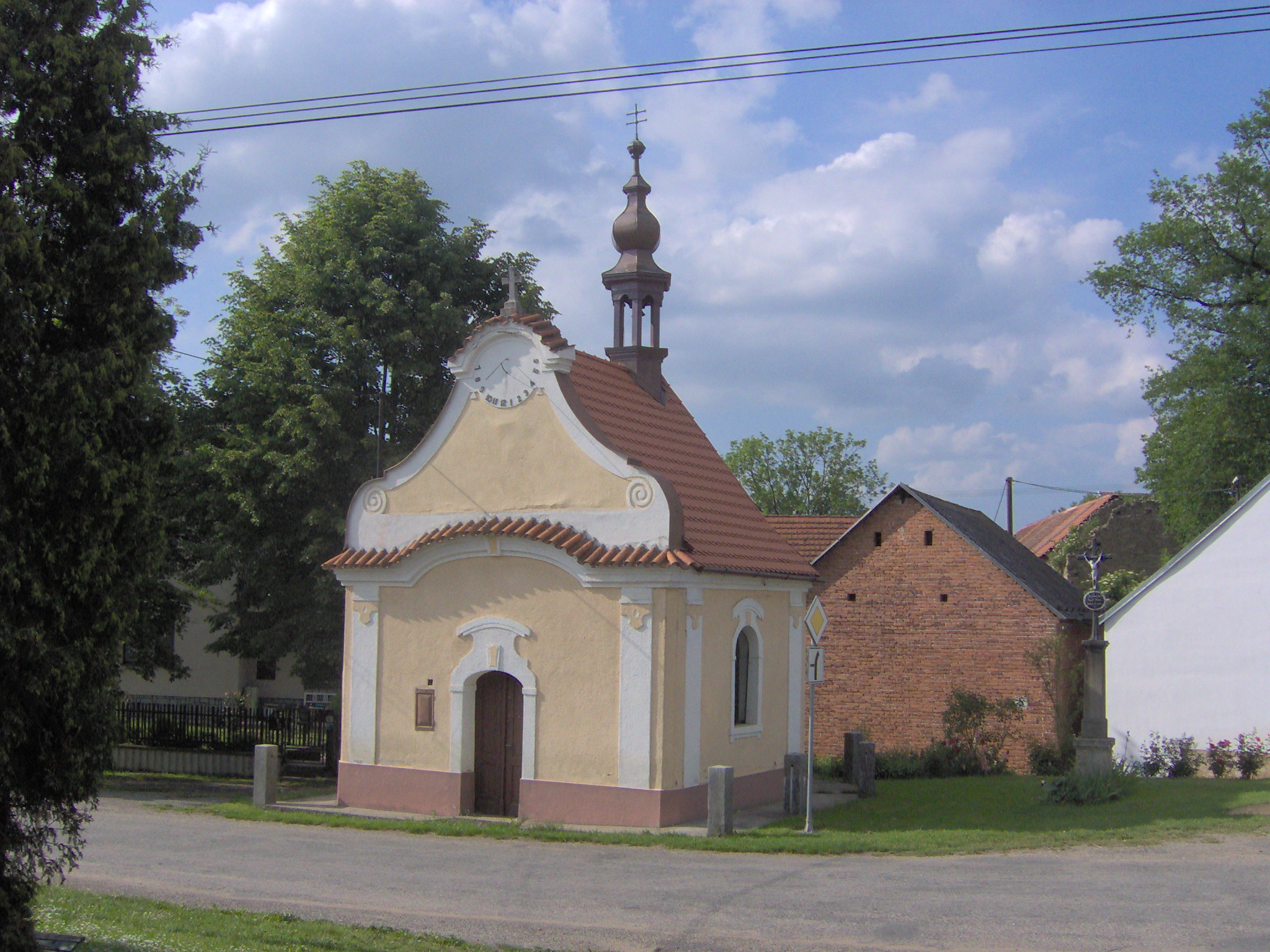
- Chapel of Saint John of Nepomuk

- Location in the Czech Republic
- Coordinates: 49°20′5″N 13°48′24″E
- Country: Czech Republic
- Region: South Bohemian
- District: Strakonice
- First mentioned: 1382

Area
  - Total: 4.74 km^{2} (1.83 sq mi)
- Elevation: 458 m (1,503 ft)

Population (2026-01-01)
  - Total: 89
  - Density: 19/km^{2} (49/sq mi)
- Time zone: UTC+1 (CET)
  - Summer (DST): UTC+2 (CEST)
- Postal code: 386 01
- Website: www.hlupin.cz

Hlupín is a municipality and village in Strakonice District in the South Bohemian Region of the Czech Republic. It has about 90 inhabitants.

Hlupín lies approximately 11 kilometres (7 mi) north-west of Strakonice, 63 km (39 mi) north-west of České Budějovice, and 95 km (59 mi) south-west of Prague.

== Demographics ==
Historical population
Year	Pop.	±%
1869	274	—
1880	313	+14.2%
1890	303	−3.2%
1900	266	−12.2%
1910	284	+6.8%
1921	281	−1.1%
1930	266	−5.3%
1950	184	−30.8%
1961	176	−4.3%
1970	149	−15.3%
1980	115	−22.8%
1991	87	−24.3%
2001	97	+11.5%
2011	92	−5.2%
2021	84	−8.7%
Source: Censuses
