= Třešovice =

- Municipality
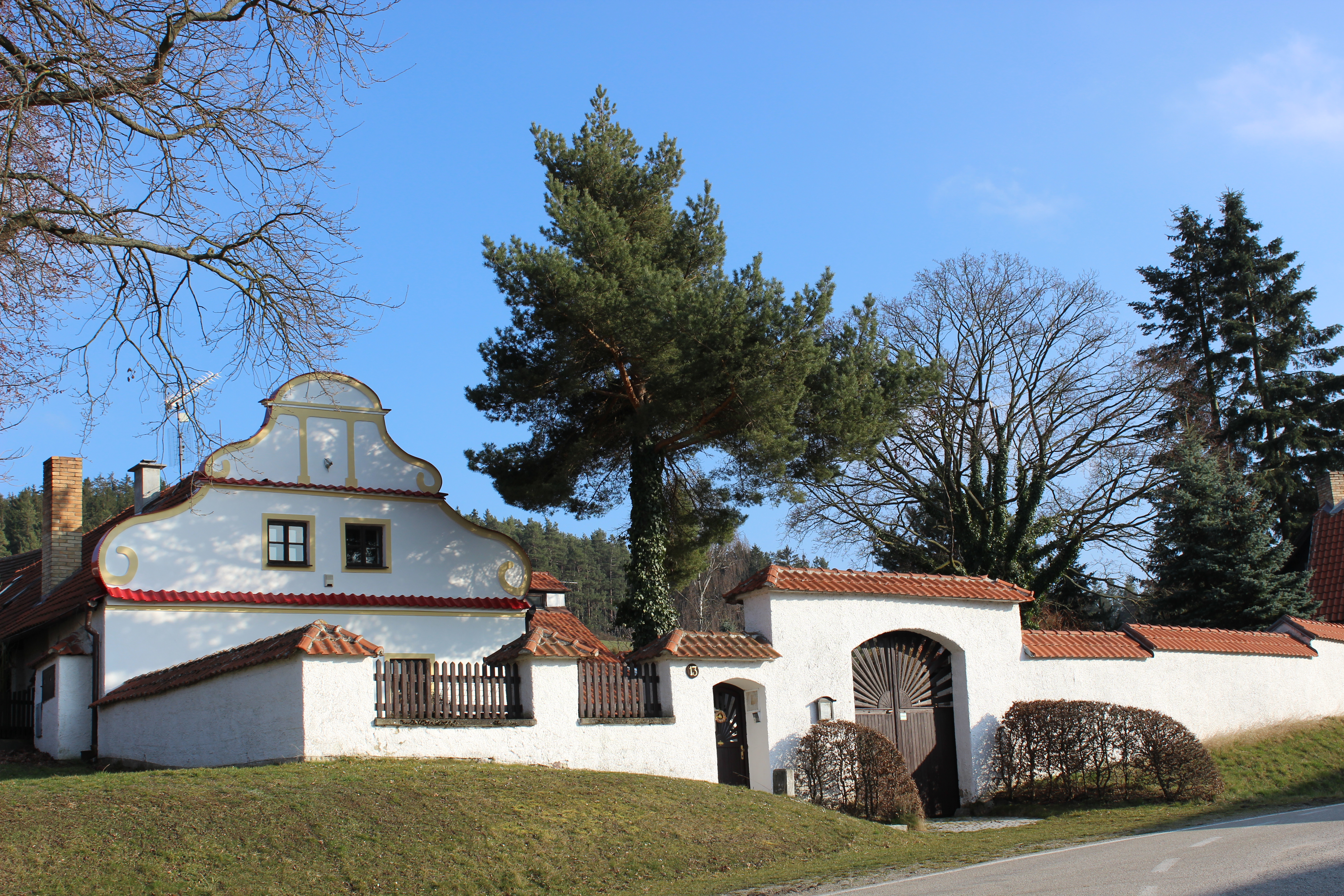
- Homestead No. 13

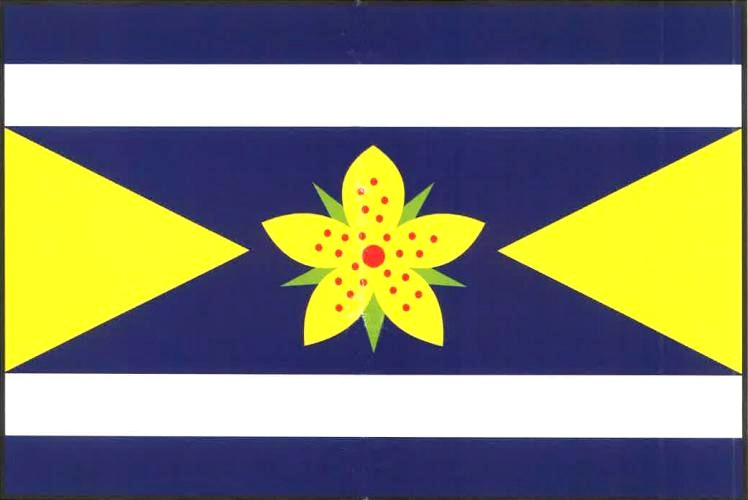
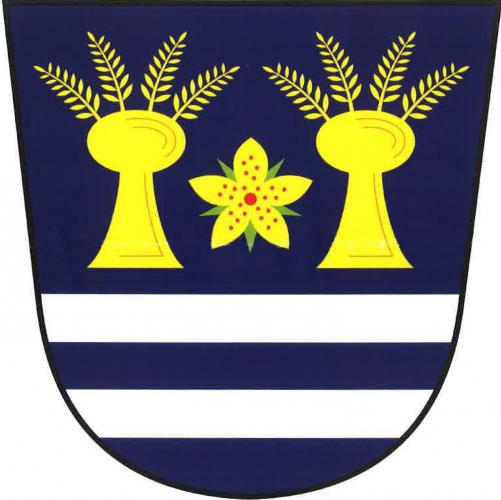
- Flag Coat of arms

- Location in the Czech Republic
- Coordinates: 49°12′41″N 13°58′53″E
- Country: Czech Republic
- Region: South Bohemian
- District: Strakonice
- First mentioned: 1303

Area
  - Total: 4.30 km^{2} (1.66 sq mi)
- Elevation: 459 m (1,506 ft)

Population (2026-01-01)
  - Total: 69
  - Density: 16/km^{2} (42/sq mi)
- Time zone: UTC+1 (CET)
  - Summer (DST): UTC+2 (CEST)
- Postal code: 386 01
- Website: www.tresovice.cz

Třešovice is a municipality and village in Strakonice District in the South Bohemian Region of the Czech Republic. It has about 70 inhabitants.

== Demographics ==
Historical population
Year	Pop.	±%
1869	224	—
1880	218	−2.7%
1890	233	+6.9%
1900	218	−6.4%
1910	221	+1.4%
1921	220	−0.5%
1930	203	−7.7%
1950	166	−18.2%
1961	125	−24.7%
1970	111	−11.2%
1980	83	−25.2%
1991	78	−6.0%
2001	80	+2.6%
2011	76	−5.0%
2021	66	−13.2%
Source: Censuses
