= Radějovice (Strakonice District) =

- Municipality
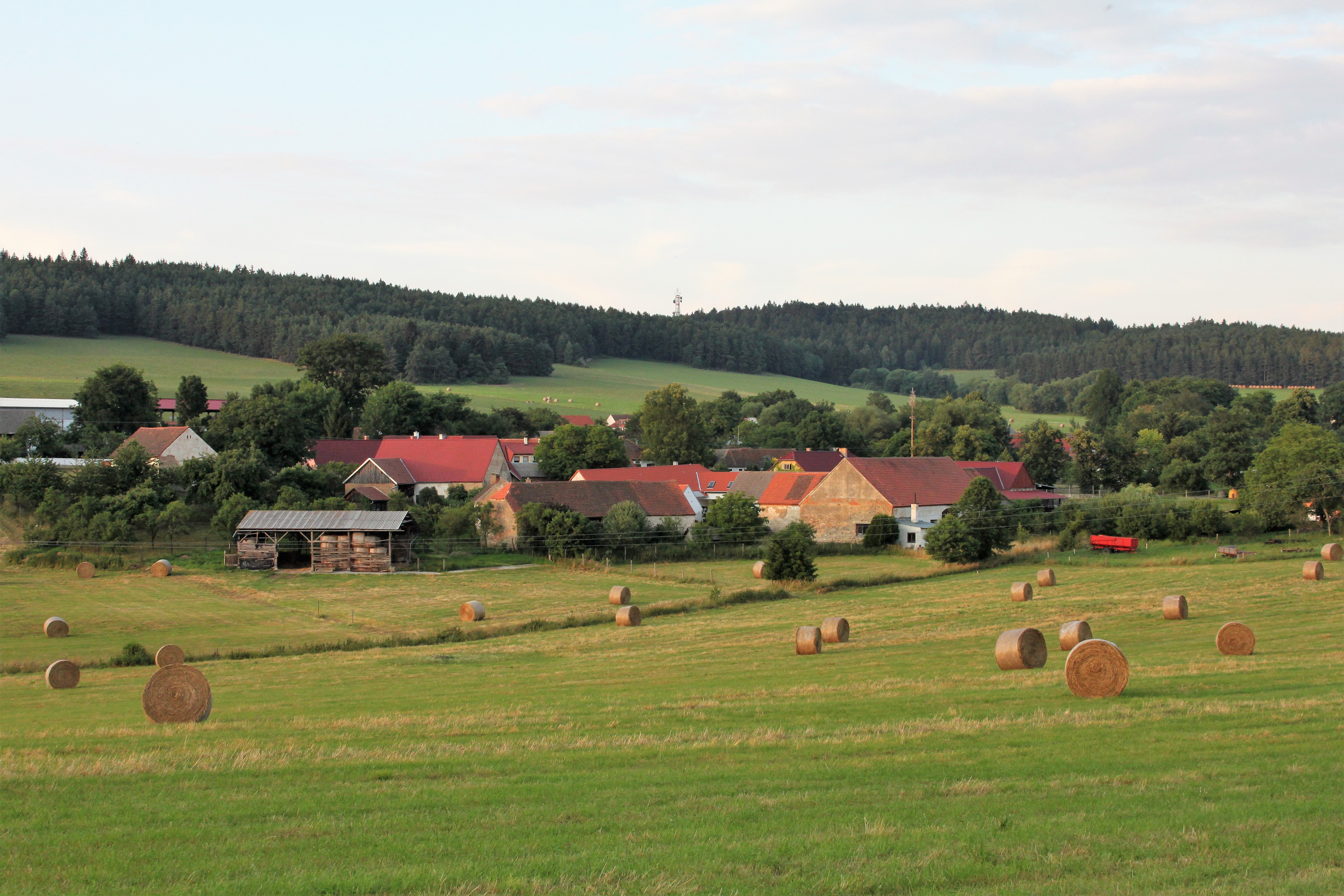
- View from the southwest

- Location in the Czech Republic
- Coordinates: 49°11′11″N 14°1′35″E
- Country: Czech Republic
- Region: South Bohemian
- District: Strakonice
- First mentioned: 1334

Area
  - Total: 2.25 km^{2} (0.87 sq mi)
- Elevation: 521 m (1,709 ft)

Population (2026-01-01)
  - Total: 47
  - Density: 21/km^{2} (54/sq mi)
- Time zone: UTC+1 (CET)
  - Summer (DST): UTC+2 (CEST)
- Postal code: 387 73
- Website: www.radejovice.cz

Radějovice is a municipality and village in Strakonice District in the South Bohemian Region of the Czech Republic. It has about 50 inhabitants.

Radějovice lies approximately 13 kilometres (8 mi) south-east of Strakonice, 40 km (25 mi) north-west of České Budějovice, and 104 km (65 mi) south of Prague.

== Demographics ==
Historical population
Year	Pop.	±%
1869	122	—
1880	146	+19.7%
1890	158	+8.2%
1900	144	−8.9%
1910	121	−16.0%
1921	130	+7.4%
1930	126	−3.1%
1950	88	−30.2%
1961	83	−5.7%
1970	85	+2.4%
1980	67	−21.2%
1991	49	−26.9%
2001	40	−18.4%
2011	28	−30.0%
2021	37	+32.1%
Source: Censuses
