= Uzeničky =

- Municipality
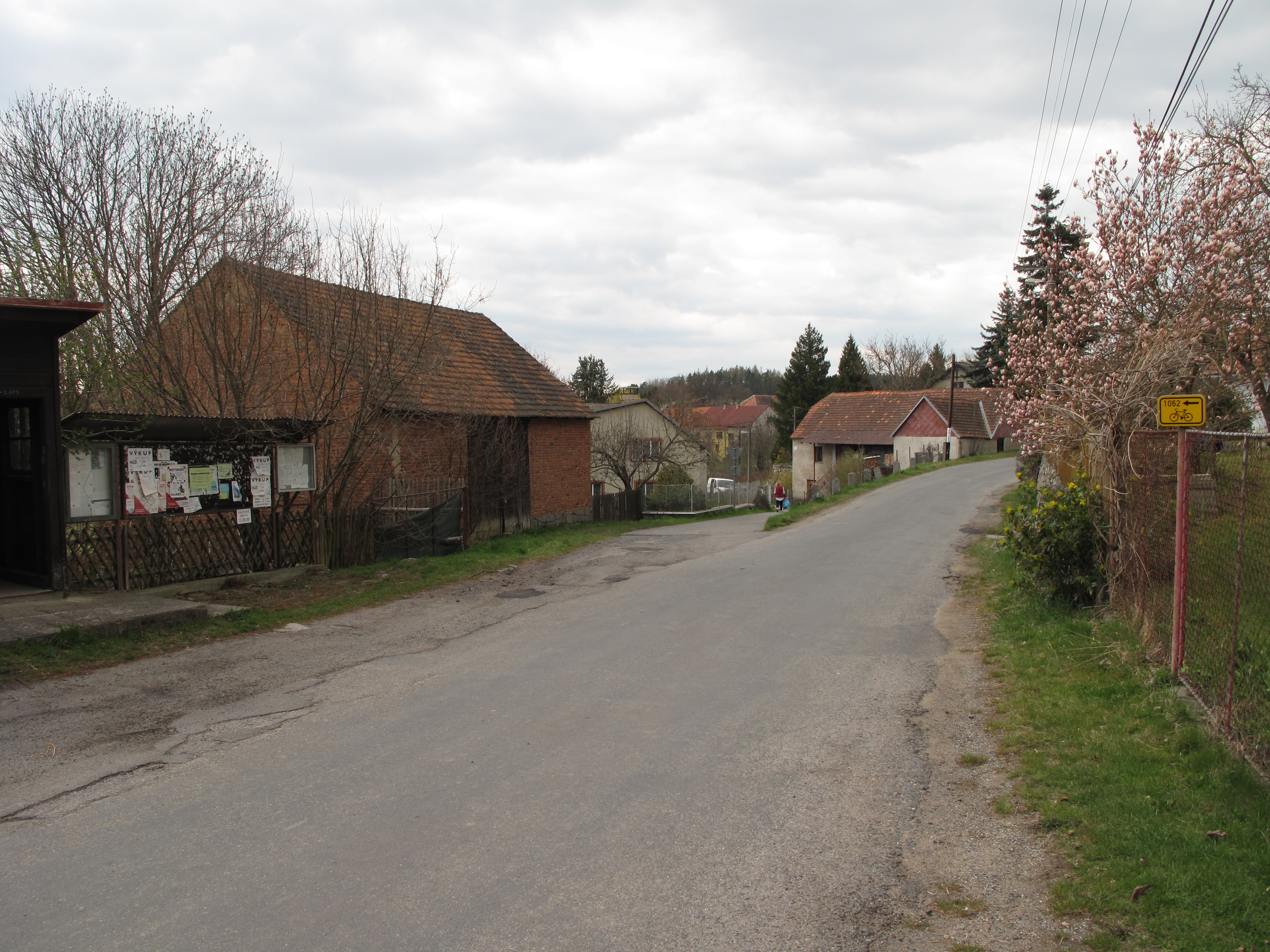
- Main street

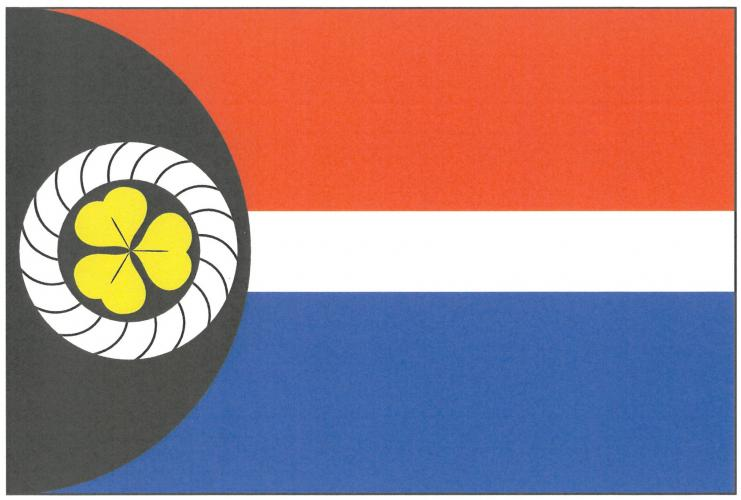
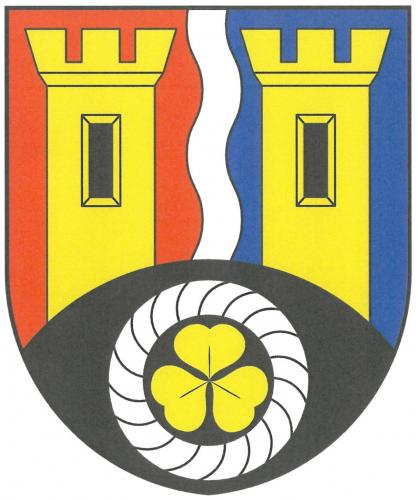
- Flag Coat of arms

- Location in the Czech Republic
- Coordinates: 49°29′20″N 13°57′9″E
- Country: Czech Republic
- Region: South Bohemian
- District: Strakonice
- First mentioned: 1260

Area
  - Total: 6.62 km^{2} (2.56 sq mi)
- Elevation: 509 m (1,670 ft)

Population (2026-01-01)
  - Total: 112
  - Density: 16.9/km^{2} (43.8/sq mi)
- Time zone: UTC+1 (CET)
  - Summer (DST): UTC+2 (CEST)
- Postal code: 388 01
- Website: obec-uzenicky.cz

Uzeničky is a municipality and village in Strakonice District in the South Bohemian Region of the Czech Republic. It has about 100 inhabitants.

== Administrative division ==
Uzeničky consists of two municipal parts (in brackets population according to the 2021 census):

- Uzeničky (87)
- Černívsko (25)

== Etymology ==
The name is a diminutive of Uzenice, which is a neighbouring village.

== Geography ==
Uzeničky is located about 25 kilometres (16 mi) north of Strakonice and 48 km (30 mi) southeast of Plzeň. It lies mostly in the Benešov Uplands, only the southwestern part of the municipal territory with the village of Černívsko lies in the Blatná Uplands. The highest point is the hill Chlumák at 549 km (341 mi) above sea level. The territory is rich in fishponds.

== History ==
The first written mention of Uzeničky is from 1260, when there was a fortress.

== Demographics ==
Historical population

Year	Pop.	±%
1869	414	—
1880	405	−2.2%
1890	408	+0.7%
1900	406	−0.5%
1910	393	−3.2%

Year	Pop.	±%
1921	332	−15.5%
1930	324	−2.4%
1950	260	−19.8%
1961	251	−3.5%
1970	225	−10.4%

Year	Pop.	±%
1980	203	−9.8%
1991	152	−25.1%
2001	141	−7.2%
2011	123	−12.8%
2021	112	−8.9%

Source: Censuses

== Transport ==
There are no railways or major roads passing through the municipality.

== Sights ==
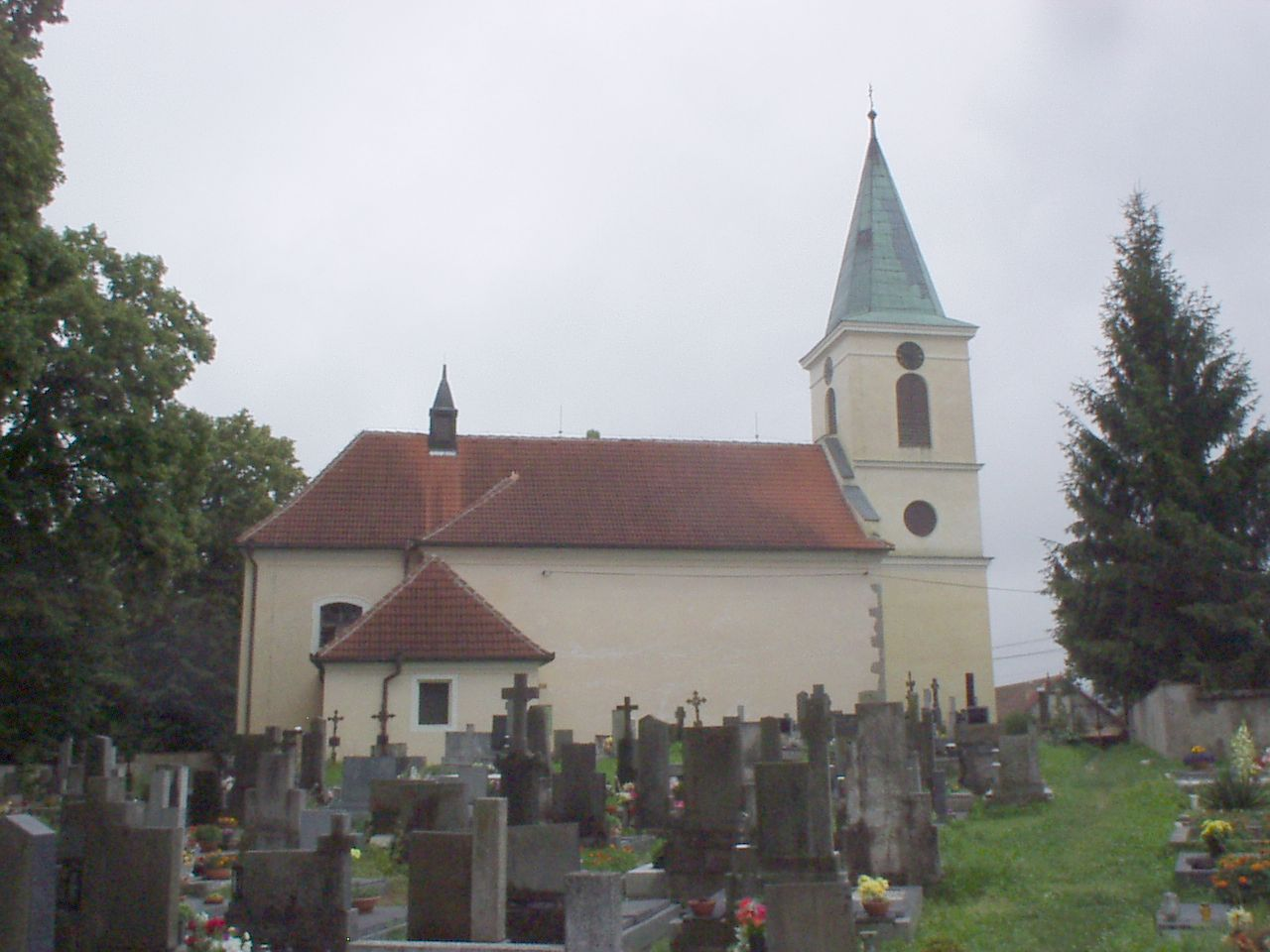
Church of the Holy Trinity

The most important monument is the Church of the Holy Trinity in Černívsko. It was originally a Gothic building from the 14th century, which was rebuilt in the Baroque style in 1722.

The Křikava Castle in Černívsko dates from the 14th century and was first mentioned in 1357. In the 15th century, it was abandoned, probably as a result of the Hussite Wars. Today it is a ruin with only a few fragments remaining.
