= Velká Turná =

- Municipality
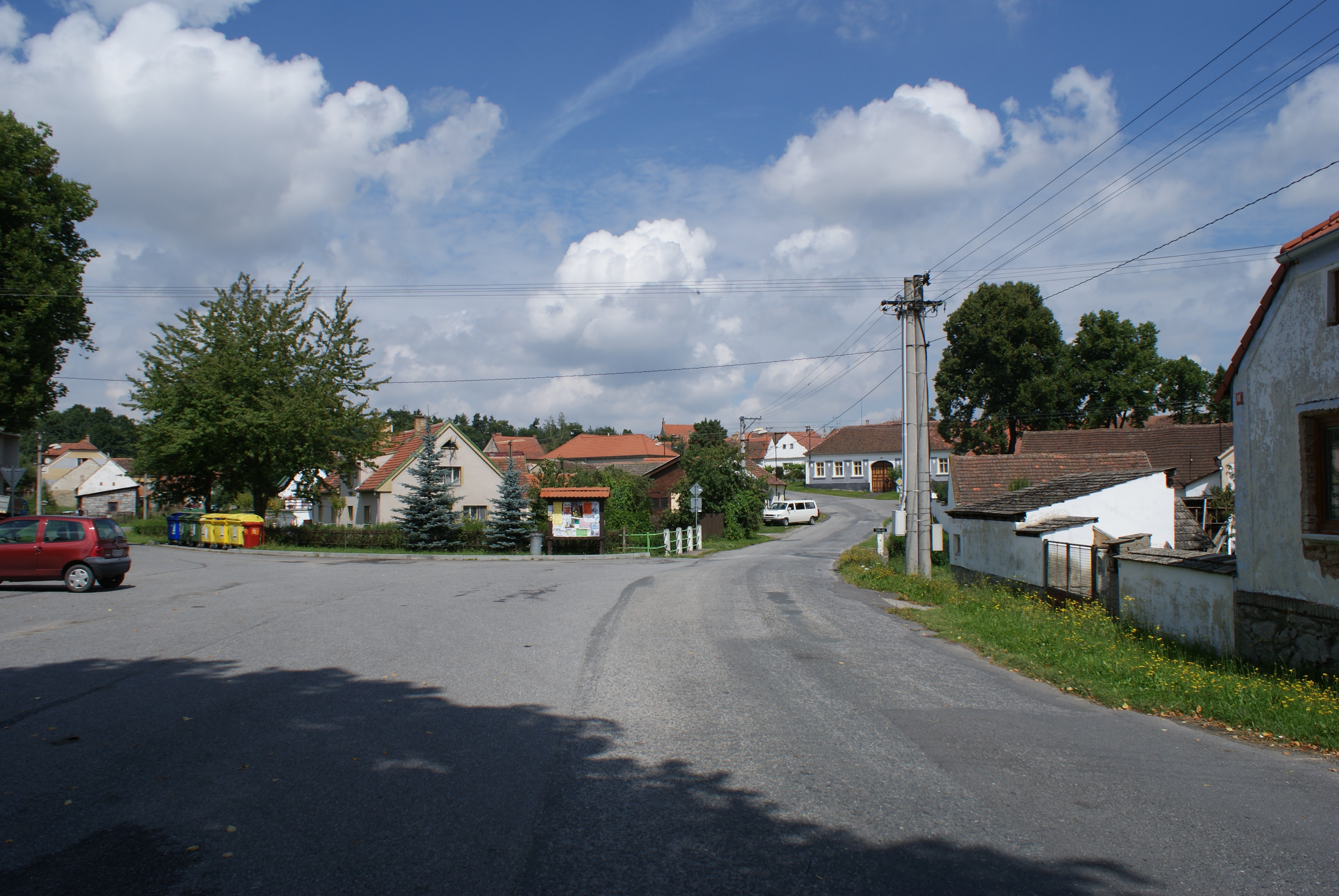
- Centre of Velká Turná

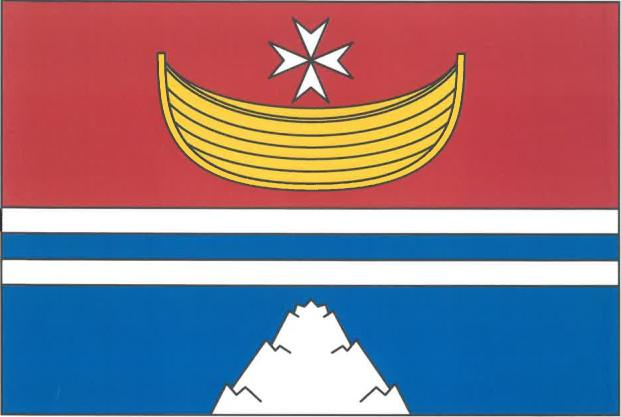
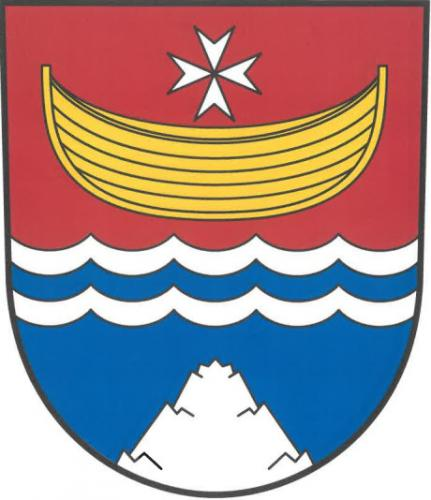
- Flag Coat of arms

- Location in the Czech Republic
- Coordinates: 49°20′25″N 13°57′31″E
- Country: Czech Republic
- Region: South Bohemian
- District: Strakonice
- First mentioned: 1372

Area
  - Total: 7.54 km^{2} (2.91 sq mi)
- Elevation: 441 m (1,447 ft)

Population (2026-01-01)
  - Total: 169
  - Density: 22.4/km^{2} (58.1/sq mi)
- Time zone: UTC+1 (CET)
  - Summer (DST): UTC+2 (CEST)
- Postal code: 386 01
- Website: www.velkaturna.cz

Velká Turná is a municipality and village in Strakonice District in the South Bohemian Region of the Czech Republic. It has about 200 inhabitants.

Velká Turná lies approximately 11 kilometres (7 mi) north-east of Strakonice, 56 km (35 mi) north-west of České Budějovice, and 89 km (55 mi) south of Prague.

== Demographics ==
Historical population
Year	Pop.	±%
1869	333	—
1880	367	+10.2%
1890	362	−1.4%
1900	340	−6.1%
1910	320	−5.9%
1921	336	+5.0%
1930	330	−1.8%
1950	255	−22.7%
1961	265	+3.9%
1970	210	−20.8%
1980	198	−5.7%
1991	162	−18.2%
2001	137	−15.4%
2011	166	+21.2%
2021	157	−5.4%
Source: Censuses
