= Kocelovice =

- Municipality
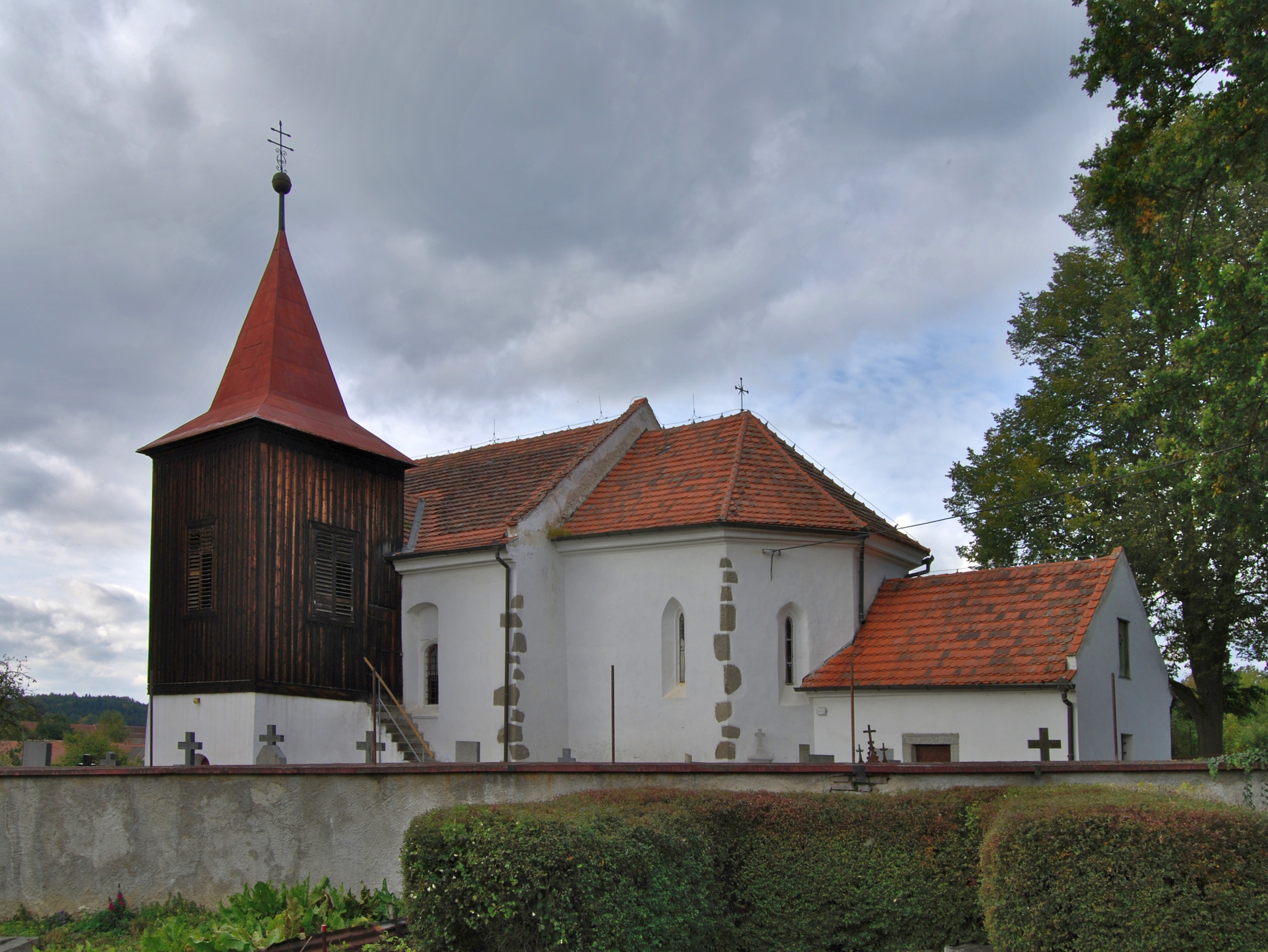
- Church of Saint Bartholomew

- Flag Coat of arms

- Location in the Czech Republic
- Coordinates: 49°27′55″N 13°49′39″E
- Country: Czech Republic
- Region: South Bohemian
- District: Strakonice
- First mentioned: 1352

Area
  - Total: 9.33 km^{2} (3.60 sq mi)
- Elevation: 474 m (1,555 ft)

Population (2026-01-01)
  - Total: 159
  - Density: 17.0/km^{2} (44.1/sq mi)
- Time zone: UTC+1 (CET)
  - Summer (DST): UTC+2 (CEST)
- Postal code: 387 42
- Website: www.kocelovice.cz

Kocelovice is a municipality and village in Strakonice District in the South Bohemian Region of the Czech Republic. It has about 200 inhabitants.

Kocelovice lies approximately 24 kilometres (15 mi) north of Strakonice, 73 km (45 mi) north-west of České Budějovice, and 81 km (50 mi) south-west of Prague.

== Climate ==
Climate data for Kocelovice (1991–2020)
| Month | Jan | Feb | Mar | Apr | May | Jun | Jul | Aug | Sep | Oct | Nov | Dec | Year |
|---|---|---|---|---|---|---|---|---|---|---|---|---|---|
| Record high °C (°F) | 16.6 (61.9) | 17.4 (63.3) | 21.7 (71.1) | 27.7 (81.9) | 31.9 (89.4) | 34.4 (93.9) | 36.5 (97.7) | 36.5 (97.7) | 32.9 (91.2) | 25.8 (78.4) | 17.6 (63.7) | 14.2 (57.6) | 36.5 (97.7) |
| Mean daily maximum °C (°F) | 1.4 (34.5) | 3.4 (38.1) | 7.9 (46.2) | 13.8 (56.8) | 18.4 (65.1) | 21.9 (71.4) | 24.2 (75.6) | 24.2 (75.6) | 18.6 (65.5) | 12.4 (54.3) | 5.8 (42.4) | 2.1 (35.8) | 12.8 (55.0) |
| Daily mean °C (°F) | −1.2 (29.8) | −0.3 (31.5) | 3.3 (37.9) | 8.4 (47.1) | 13.0 (55.4) | 16.5 (61.7) | 18.3 (64.9) | 18.0 (64.4) | 13.0 (55.4) | 8.0 (46.4) | 3.1 (37.6) | −0.3 (31.5) | 8.3 (46.9) |
| Mean daily minimum °C (°F) | −3.9 (25.0) | −3.6 (25.5) | −0.5 (31.1) | 3.1 (37.6) | 7.5 (45.5) | 10.9 (51.6) | 12.7 (54.9) | 12.4 (54.3) | 8.5 (47.3) | 4.4 (39.9) | 0.5 (32.9) | −2.8 (27.0) | 4.1 (39.4) |
| Record low °C (°F) | −20.7 (−5.3) | −21.0 (−5.8) | −19.4 (−2.9) | −8.2 (17.2) | −2.6 (27.3) | 1.1 (34.0) | 4.3 (39.7) | 3.4 (38.1) | −2.0 (28.4) | −8.2 (17.2) | −14.3 (6.3) | −24.4 (−11.9) | −24.4 (−11.9) |
| Average precipitation mm (inches) | 34.5 (1.36) | 26.8 (1.06) | 39.0 (1.54) | 34.2 (1.35) | 62.0 (2.44) | 76.9 (3.03) | 79.2 (3.12) | 79.0 (3.11) | 43.4 (1.71) | 43.7 (1.72) | 37.1 (1.46) | 35.4 (1.39) | 591.2 (23.28) |
| Average precipitation days (≥ 1.0 mm) | 8.5 | 6.9 | 8.7 | 7.5 | 10.1 | 10.6 | 11.0 | 9.2 | 8.2 | 8.1 | 7.4 | 8.5 | 104.7 |
| Mean monthly sunshine hours | 52.9 | 87.2 | 132.4 | 193.4 | 224.3 | 230.6 | 246.6 | 238.9 | 166.7 | 108.6 | 50.0 | 44.2 | 1,775.8 |
Source: NOAA

== Demographics ==
Historical population
| Year | Pop. | ±% |
|---|---|---|
| 1869 | 530 | — |
| 1880 | 571 | +7.7% |
| 1890 | 565 | −1.1% |
| 1900 | 516 | −8.7% |
| 1910 | 489 | −5.2% |
| 1921 | 472 | −3.5% |
| 1930 | 423 | −10.4% |
| 1950 | 349 | −17.5% |
| 1961 | 333 | −4.6% |
| 1970 | 298 | −10.5% |
| 1980 | 244 | −18.1% |
| 1991 | 200 | −18.0% |
| 2001 | 185 | −7.5% |
| 2011 | 161 | −13.0% |
| 2021 | 140 | −13.0% |
Source: Censuses
