= Miloňovice =

- Municipality
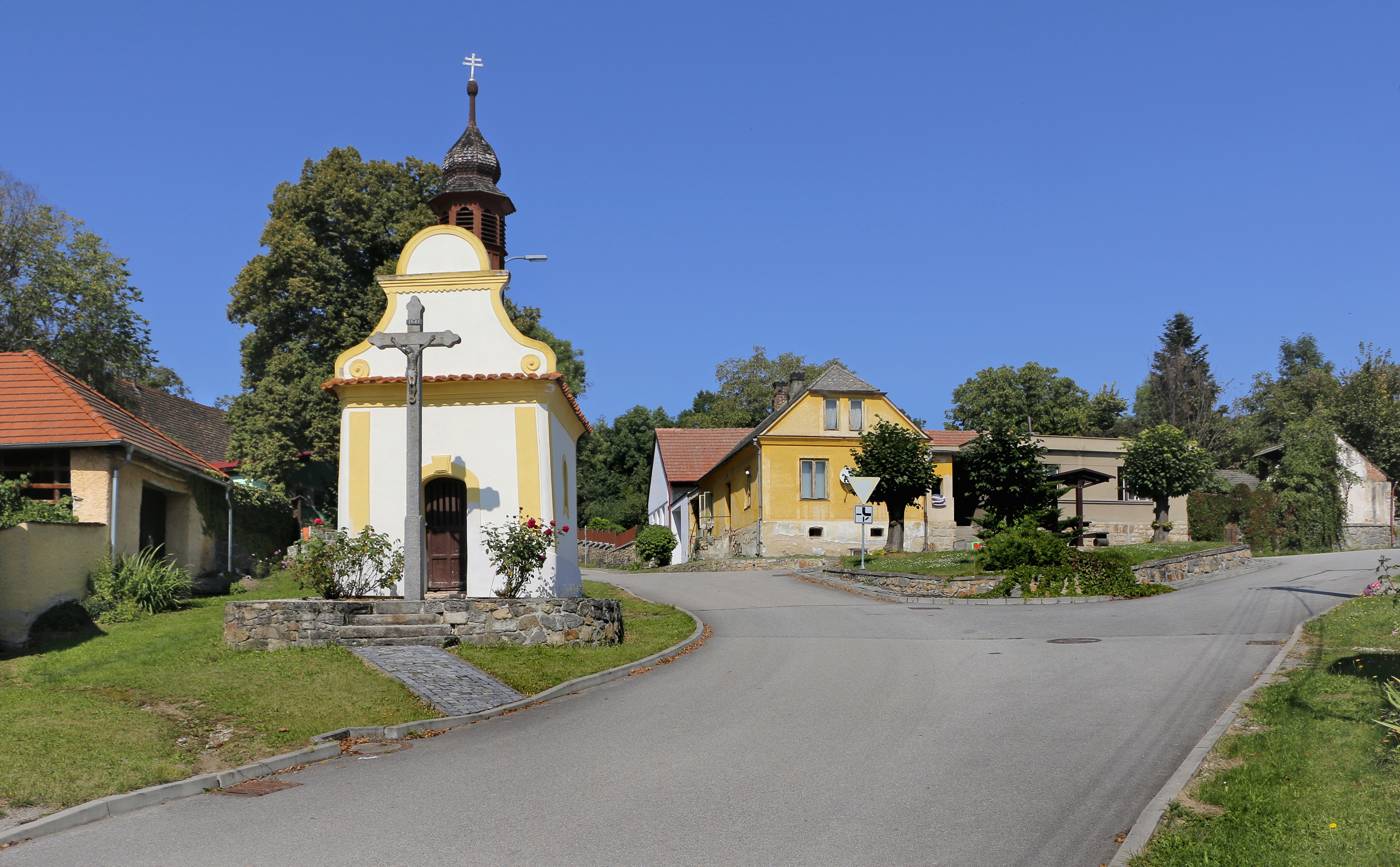
- Chapel of the Assumption of the Virgin Mary

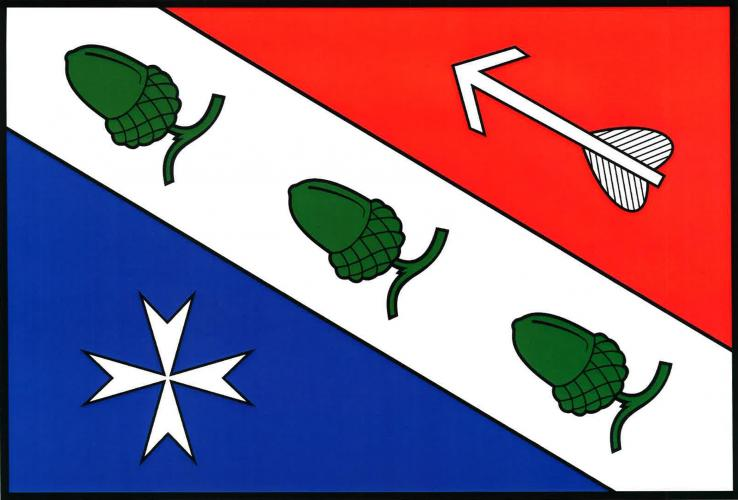
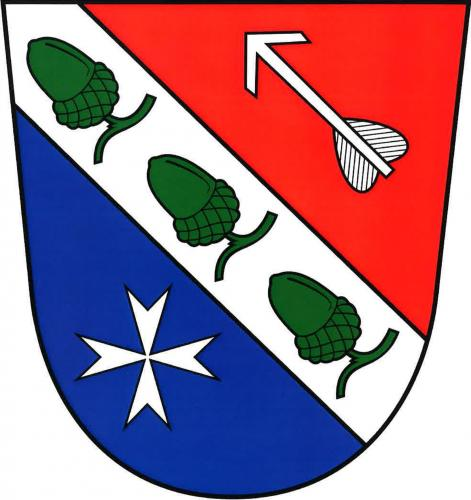
- Flag Coat of arms

- Location in the Czech Republic
- Coordinates: 49°13′14″N 13°57′30″E
- Country: Czech Republic
- Region: South Bohemian
- District: Strakonice
- First mentioned: 1243

Area
  - Total: 6.28 km^{2} (2.42 sq mi)
- Elevation: 480 m (1,570 ft)

Population (2026-01-01)
  - Total: 260
  - Density: 41/km^{2} (110/sq mi)
- Time zone: UTC+1 (CET)
  - Summer (DST): UTC+2 (CEST)
- Postal code: 386 01
- Website: www.milonovice.cz

Miloňovice is a municipality and village in Strakonice District in the South Bohemian Region of the Czech Republic. It has about 300 inhabitants.

Miloňovice lies approximately 7 kilometres (4 mi) south-east of Strakonice, 47 km (29 mi) north-west of České Budějovice, and 103 km (64 mi) south of Prague.

== Administrative division ==
Miloňovice consists of three municipal parts (in brackets population according to the 2021 census):

- Miloňovice (222)
- Sudkovice (28)
- Nová Ves (3)

== Demographics ==
Historical population
Year	Pop.	±%
1869	351	—
1880	364	+3.7%
1890	370	+1.6%
1900	349	−5.7%
1910	353	+1.1%
1921	354	+0.3%
1930	309	−12.7%
1950	273	−11.7%
1961	299	+9.5%
1970	263	−12.0%
1980	194	−26.2%
1991	217	+11.9%
2001	278	+28.1%
2011	267	−4.0%
2021	253	−5.2%
Source: Censuses
