= Nebřehovice =

- Municipality
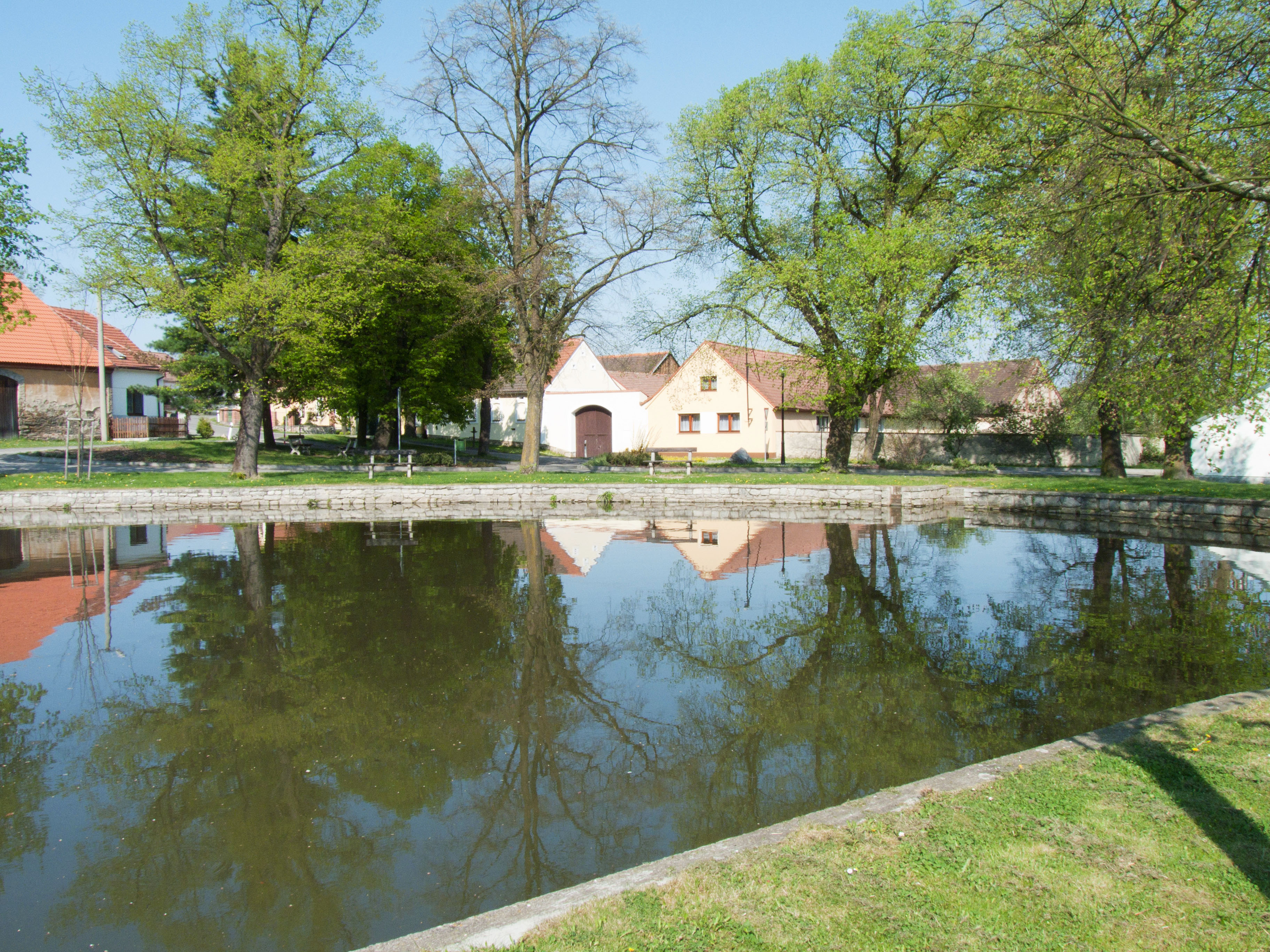
- Centre of Nebřehovice

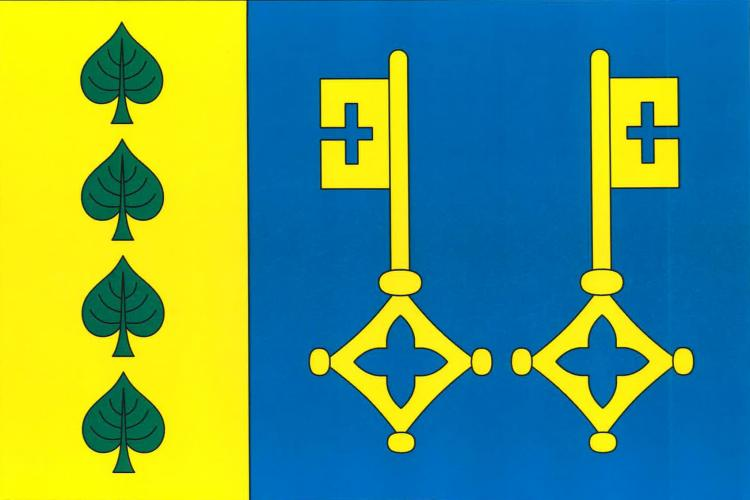
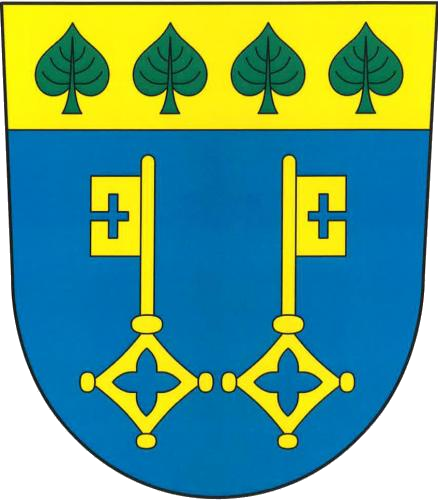
- Flag Coat of arms

- Location in the Czech Republic
- Coordinates: 49°14′19″N 13°57′43″E
- Country: Czech Republic
- Region: South Bohemian
- District: Strakonice
- First mentioned: 1253

Area
  - Total: 5.19 km^{2} (2.00 sq mi)
- Elevation: 450 m (1,480 ft)

Population (2026-01-01)
  - Total: 181
  - Density: 34.9/km^{2} (90.3/sq mi)
- Time zone: UTC+1 (CET)
  - Summer (DST): UTC+2 (CEST)
- Postal code: 386 01
- Website: www.nebrehovice.cz

Nebřehovice is a municipality and village in Strakonice District in the South Bohemian Region of the Czech Republic. It has about 200 inhabitants.

Nebřehovice lies approximately 6 kilometres (4 mi) south-east of Strakonice, 48 km (30 mi) north-west of České Budějovice, and 100 km (62 mi) south of Prague.

== Administrative division ==
Nebřehovice consists of two municipal parts (in brackets population according to the 2021 census):

- Nebřehovice (120)
- Zadní Ptákovice (46)

== Demographics ==
Historical population
Year	Pop.	±%
1869	306	—
1880	305	−0.3%
1890	310	+1.6%
1900	291	−6.1%
1910	284	−2.4%
1921	267	−6.0%
1930	252	−5.6%
1950	193	−23.4%
1961	180	−6.7%
1970	158	−12.2%
1980	139	−12.0%
1991	129	−7.2%
2001	132	+2.3%
2011	130	−1.5%
2021	166	+27.7%
Source: Censuses
