= Kalenice =

- Municipality
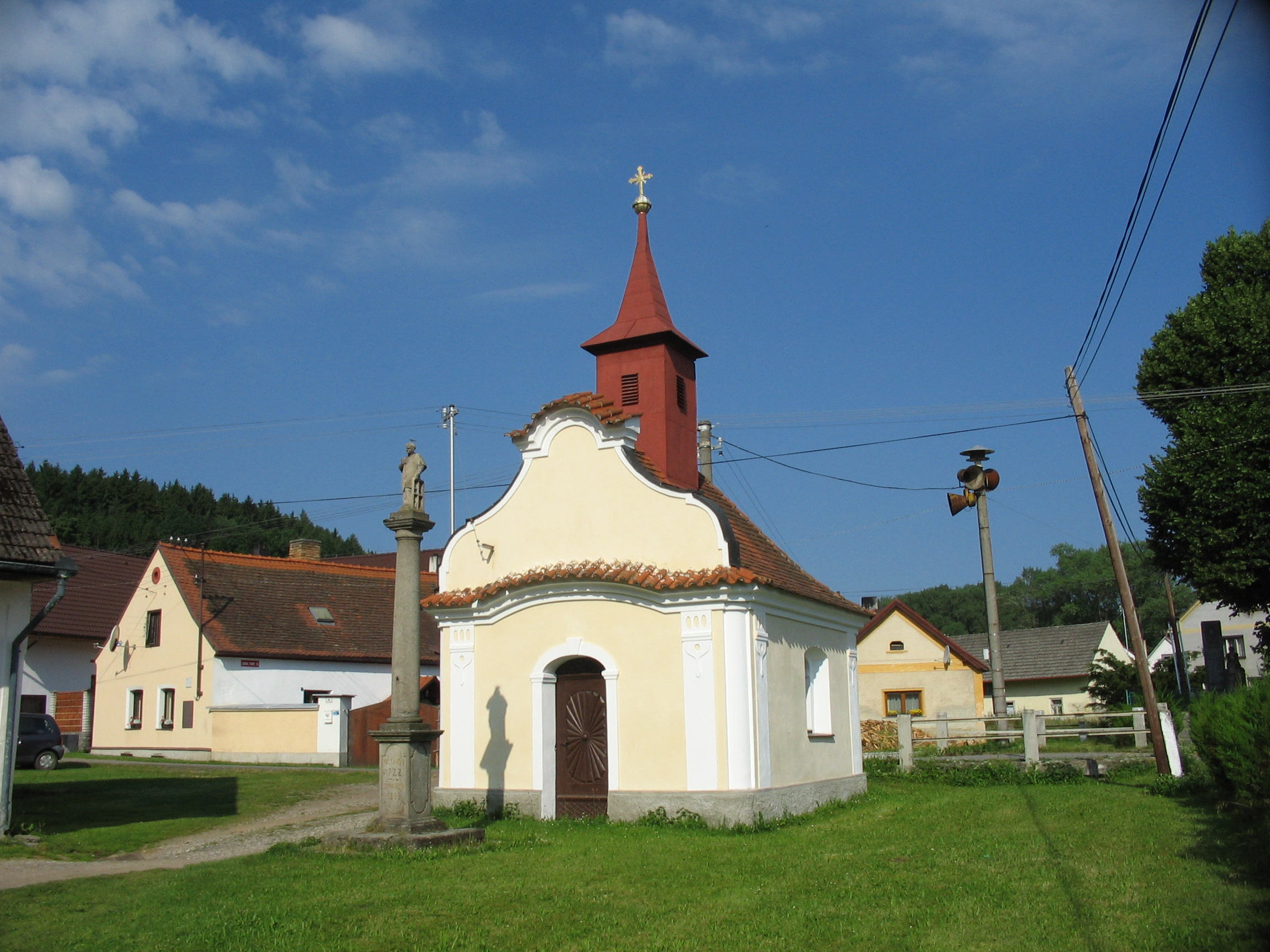
- Chapel of Saint Francis of Assisi

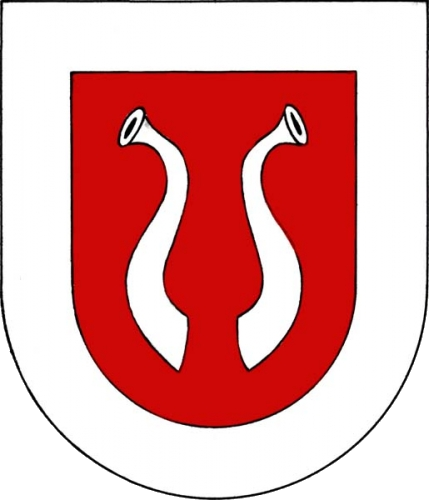
- Flag Coat of arms

- Location in the Czech Republic
- Coordinates: 49°16′18″N 13°43′0″E
- Country: Czech Republic
- Region: South Bohemian
- District: Strakonice
- First mentioned: 1045

Area
  - Total: 4.13 km^{2} (1.59 sq mi)
- Elevation: 513 m (1,683 ft)

Population (2026-01-01)
  - Total: 81
  - Density: 20/km^{2} (51/sq mi)
- Time zone: UTC+1 (CET)
  - Summer (DST): UTC+2 (CEST)
- Postal codes: 386 01, 387 16
- Website: obeckalenice.estranky.cz

Kalenice is a municipality and village in Strakonice District in the South Bohemian Region of the Czech Republic. It has about 80 inhabitants.

Kalenice lies approximately 14 kilometres (9 mi) west of Strakonice, 65 km (40 mi) north-west of České Budějovice, and 104 km (65 mi) south-west of Prague.

== Demographics ==
Historical population
| Year | Pop. | ±% |
|---|---|---|
| 1869 | 316 | — |
| 1880 | 320 | +1.3% |
| 1890 | 361 | +12.8% |
| 1900 | 328 | −9.1% |
| 1910 | 290 | −11.6% |
| 1921 | 307 | +5.9% |
| 1930 | 275 | −10.4% |
| 1950 | 208 | −24.4% |
| 1961 | 190 | −8.7% |
| 1970 | 171 | −10.0% |
| 1980 | 139 | −18.7% |
| 1991 | 115 | −17.3% |
| 2001 | 97 | −15.7% |
| 2011 | 87 | −10.3% |
| 2021 | 77 | −11.5% |
Source: Censuses
