= Kraselov =

- Municipality
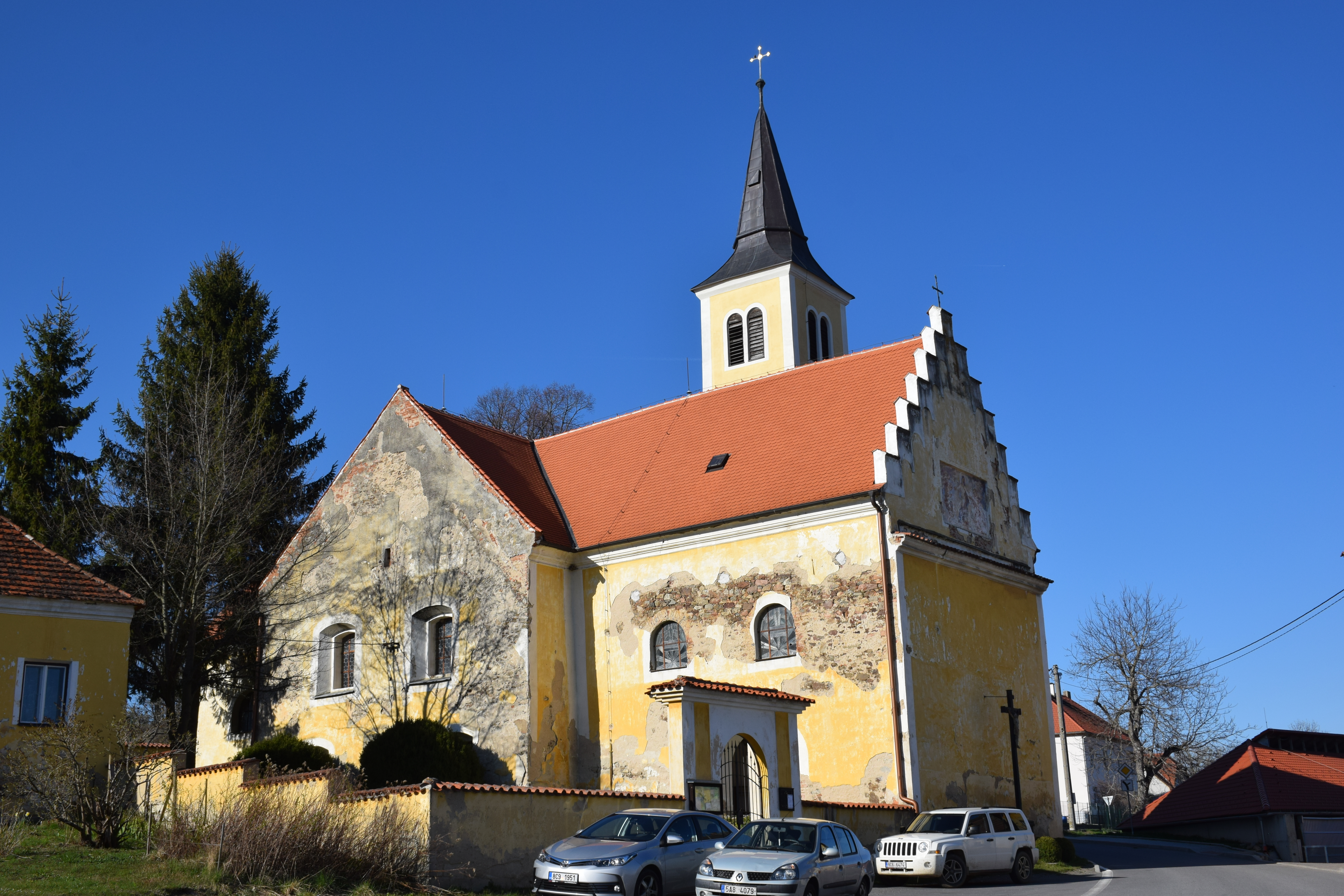
- Church of Saint Lawrence

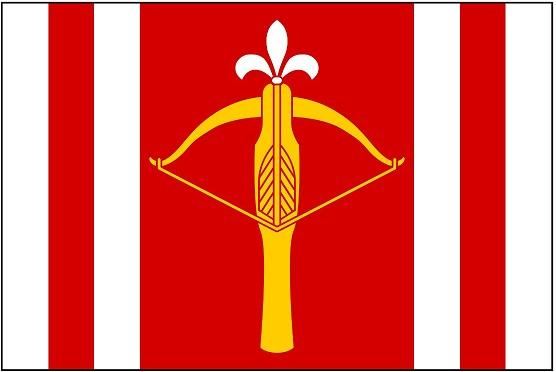
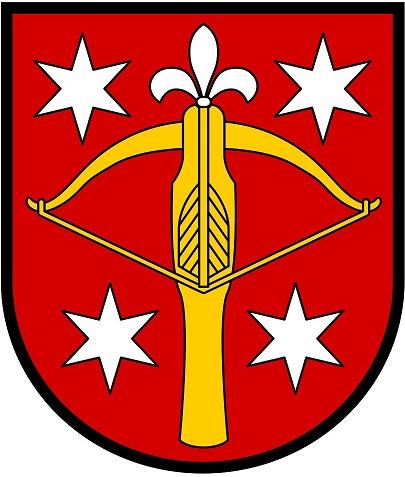
- Flag Coat of arms

- Location in the Czech Republic
- Coordinates: 49°13′41″N 13°48′14″E
- Country: Czech Republic
- Region: South Bohemian
- District: Strakonice
- First mentioned: 1352

Area
  - Total: 8.02 km^{2} (3.10 sq mi)
- Elevation: 595 m (1,952 ft)

Population (2026-01-01)
  - Total: 237
  - Density: 29.6/km^{2} (76.5/sq mi)
- Time zone: UTC+1 (CET)
  - Summer (DST): UTC+2 (CEST)
- Postal code: 387 16
- Website: obec-kraselov.webnode.cz

Kraselov is a municipality and village in Strakonice District in the South Bohemian Region of the Czech Republic. It has about 200 inhabitants.

Kraselov lies approximately 9 kilometres (6 mi) south-west of Strakonice, 57 km (35 mi) north-west of České Budějovice, and 106 km (66 mi) south-west of Prague.

== Administrative division ==
Kraselov consists of four municipal parts (in brackets population according to the 2021 census):

- Kraselov (173)
- Lhota u Svaté Anny (31)
- Milčice (9)
- Mladotice (15)

== Demographics ==
Historical population
Year	Pop.	±%
1869	683	—
1880	666	−2.5%
1890	622	−6.6%
1900	594	−4.5%
1910	657	+10.6%
1921	597	−9.1%
1930	559	−6.4%
1950	412	−26.3%
1961	446	+8.3%
1970	366	−17.9%
1980	352	−3.8%
1991	264	−25.0%
2001	243	−8.0%
2011	214	−11.9%
2021	228	+6.5%
Source: Censuses
