= Černívsko =

- Village
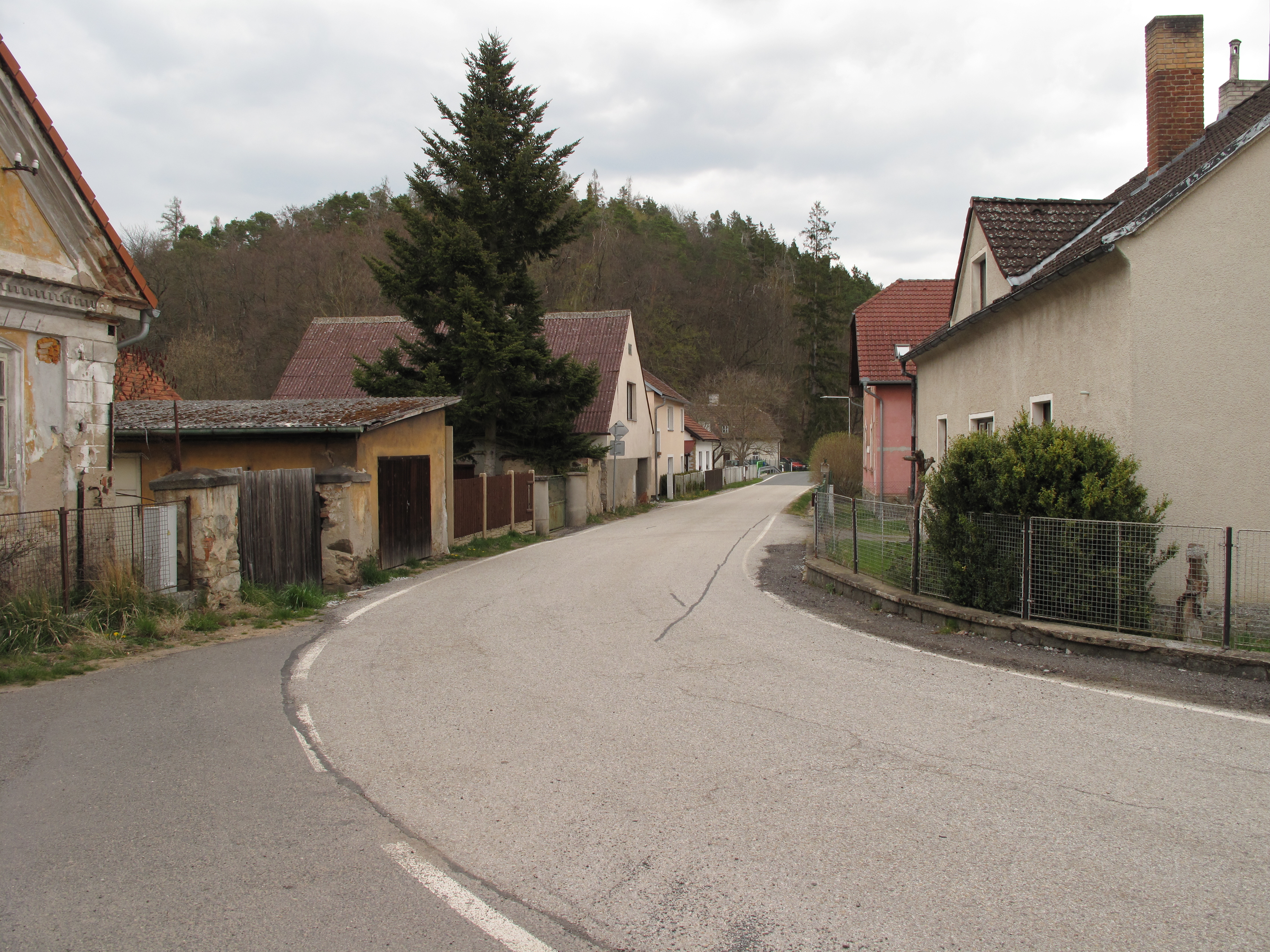
- Main road

- Location in the Czech Republic
- Coordinates: 49°28′27″N 13°56′12″E
- Country: Czech Republic
- Region: South Bohemian
- District: Strakonice
- Municipality: Uzeničky
- First mentioned: 1352

Area
  - Total: 1.29 km^{2} (0.50 sq mi)
- Elevation: 465 m (1,526 ft)

Population (2021)
  - Total: 25
  - Density: 19/km^{2} (50/sq mi)
- Time zone: UTC+1 (CET)
  - Summer (DST): UTC+2 (CEST)
- Postal code: 387 44

Černívsko is a village and administrative part of Uzeničky in Strakonice District in the South Bohemian Region of the Czech Republic It has about 30 inhabitants.

== History ==
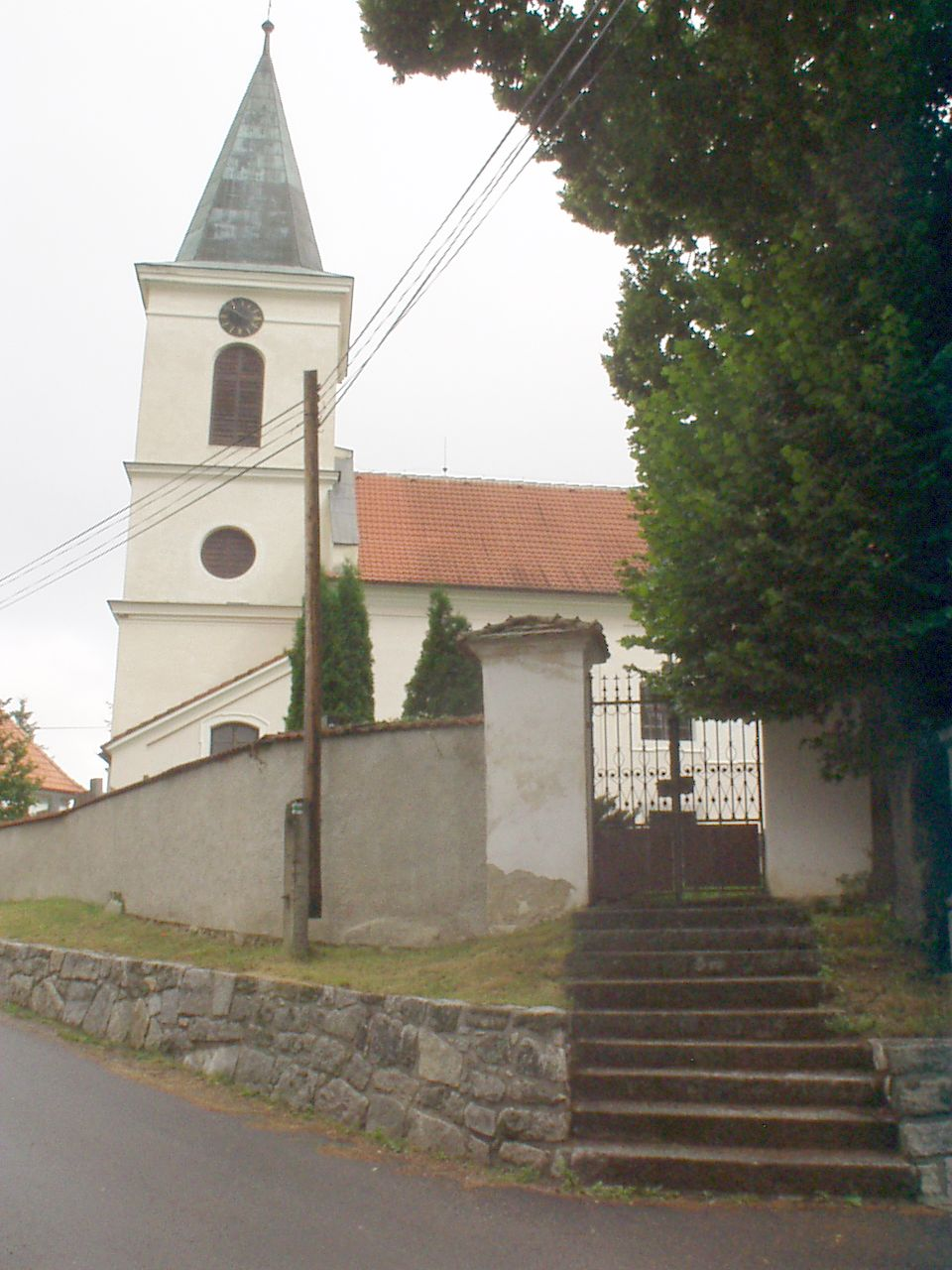
Church of the Holy Trinity

The first written mention of Černívsko is from 1352.

== Sights ==
The most important monument is the Church of the Holy Trinity in Černívsko. It was originally a Gothic building from the 14th century, which was rebuilt in the Baroque style in 1722.

The Křikava Castle in dates from the 14th century and was first mentioned in 1357. It the 15th century, it was abandoned, probably as a result of the Hussite Wars. Today it is a ruin, with only a few fragments remaining.
