= Uzenice =

- Municipality
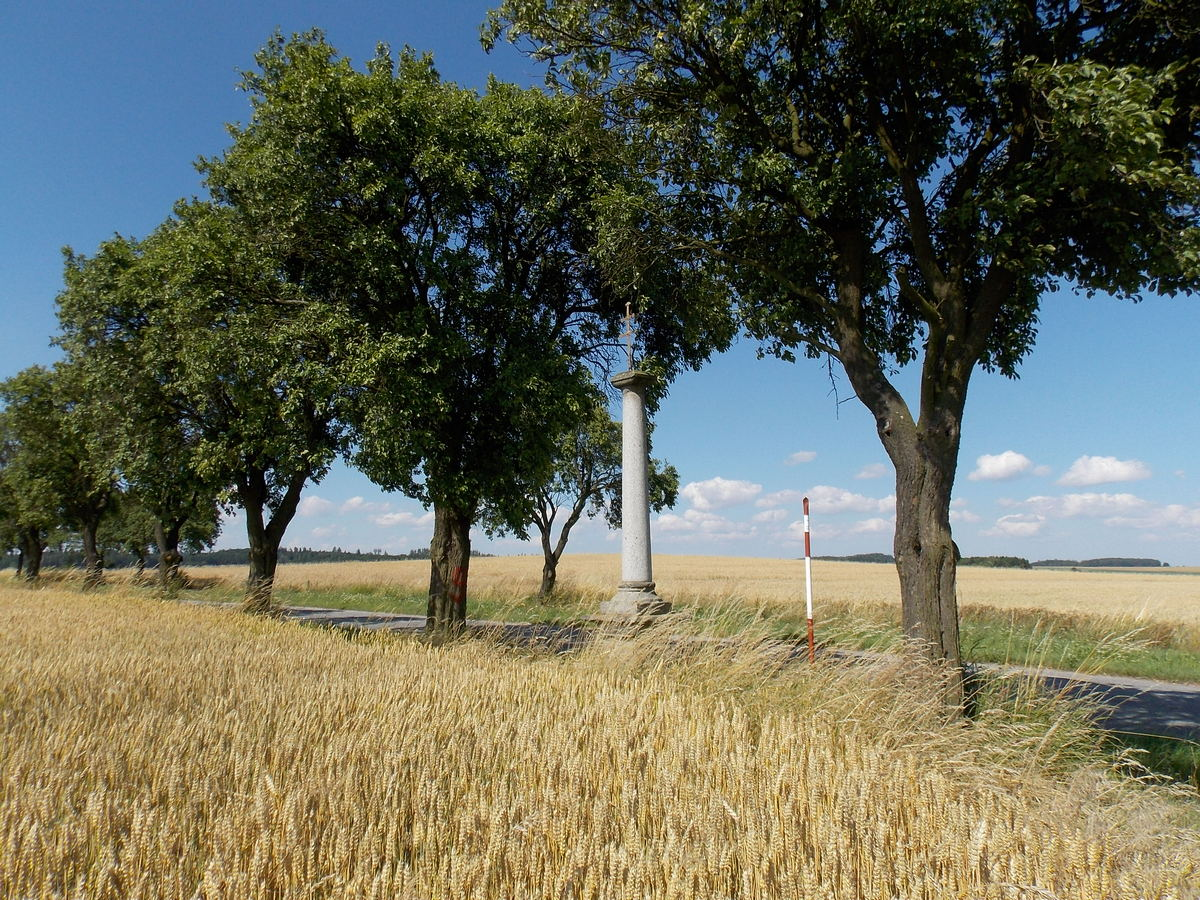
- Column shrine

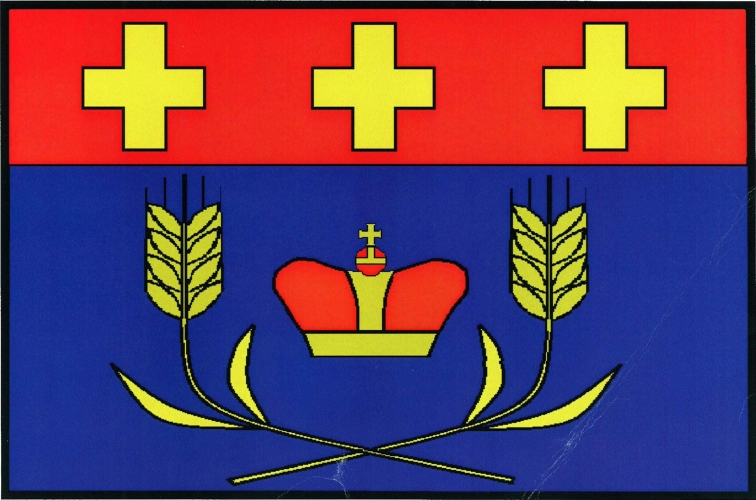
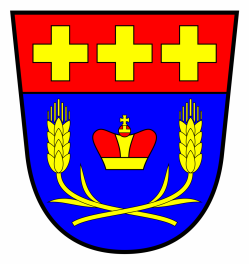
- Flag Coat of arms

- Location in the Czech Republic
- Coordinates: 49°28′24″N 13°57′36″E
- Country: Czech Republic
- Region: South Bohemian
- District: Strakonice
- First mentioned: 1227

Area
  - Total: 5.38 km^{2} (2.08 sq mi)
- Elevation: 488 m (1,601 ft)

Population (2026-01-01)
  - Total: 101
  - Density: 18.8/km^{2} (48.6/sq mi)
- Time zone: UTC+1 (CET)
  - Summer (DST): UTC+2 (CEST)
- Postal code: 388 01
- Website: obec-uzenice.cz

Uzenice is a municipality and village in Strakonice District in the South Bohemian Region of the Czech Republic. It has about 100 inhabitants.

Uzenice lies approximately 24 kilometres (15 mi) north of Strakonice, 67 km (42 mi) north-west of České Budějovice, and 77 km (48 mi) south-west of Prague.

== Demographics ==
Historical population
Year	Pop.	±%
1869	310	—
1880	345	+11.3%
1890	368	+6.7%
1900	339	−7.9%
1910	301	−11.2%
1921	303	+0.7%
1930	274	−9.6%
1950	181	−33.9%
1961	185	+2.2%
1970	168	−9.2%
1980	162	−3.6%
1991	121	−25.3%
2001	120	−0.8%
2011	121	+0.8%
2021	91	−24.8%
Source: Censuses
