= Bažantnice u Pracejovic =

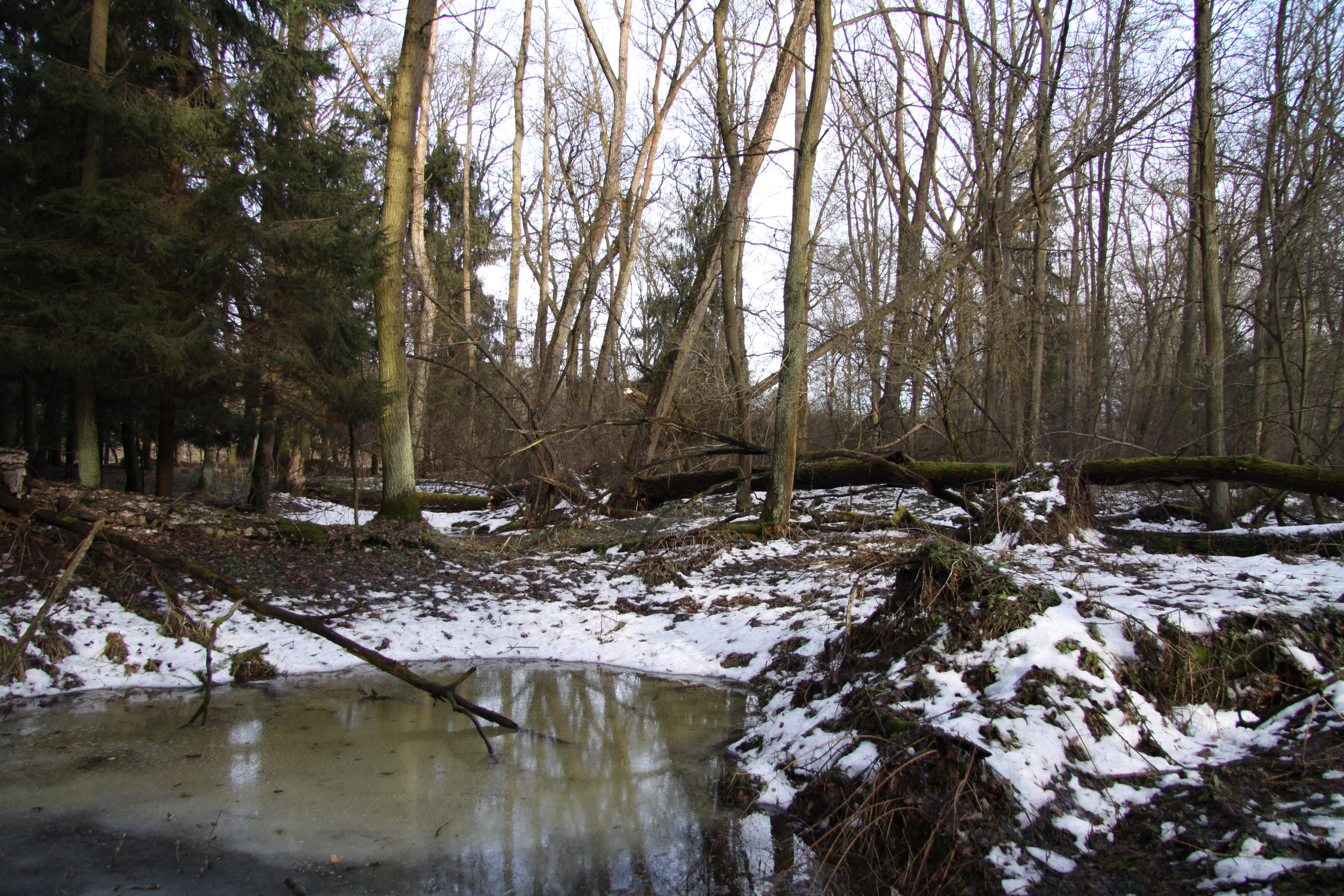
- Bažantnice u Pracejovic in winter

- Location within Czech Republic
- Location: South Bohemian Region, Czech Republic
- Coordinates: 49°15′37″N 13°52′0.6″E
- Area: 21.89 ha (54.1 acres)
- Elevation: 398 m (1,306 ft)
- Established: 1 December 1985
- Operator: AOPK ČR

Bažantnice u Pracejovic is a nature reserve near Strakonice in the South Bohemian Region of the Czech Republic.

== Flora ==
The reason for protection of this area is the occurrence of a riparian forest relic in the Otava River bed with relatively preserved tree and herb layer with typical types of riparian forest. For example, in the area grows Aconitum variegatum, Hottonia palustris, Thalictrum aquilegiifolium, Corydalis intermedia, Primula elatior, Carex riparia, or Lemna trisulca.
