= Střela (Strakonice) =

Coordinates: 49°16′04″N 13°51′07″E

- Village
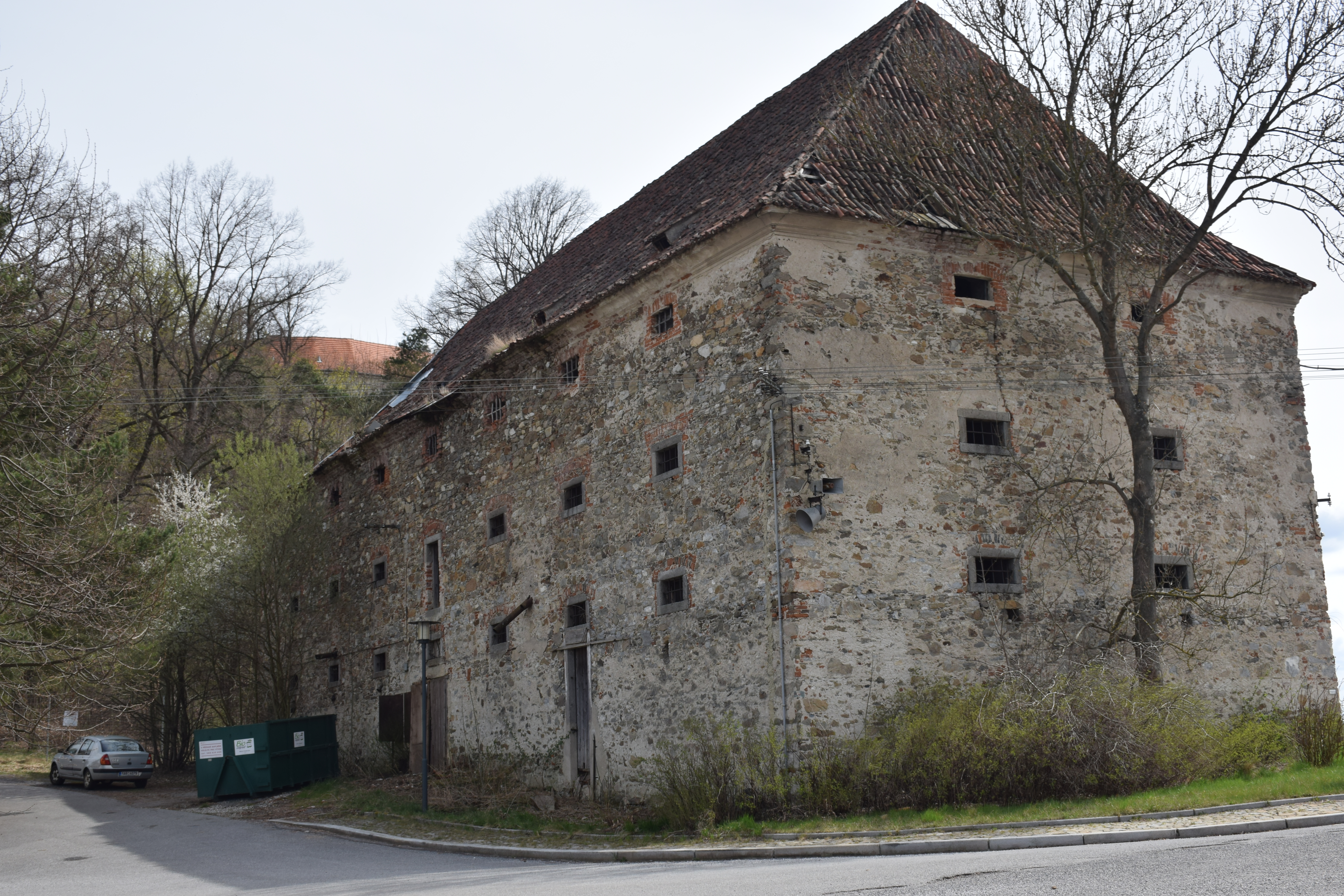
- Former granary in the village
- Interactive map of Střela

Střela is a village, a local part of the town Strakonice in the district of Strakonice, the Czech Republic. It is located less than 4 km west of Strakonice; the Kolčavka stream flows through it, which feeds Střelský pond in the village and a few hundred meters further flows into the Otava river on the left. In the eastern extremity of the cadastral territory of Střela, there is also the old settlement of Virt, which is a separate registered part of the city and divides the local part of Střela into two parts. The village is crossed by road I/22 connecting Strakonice and Horažďovice.

== History ==
The first owner of the village was Martin of Střela in 1242, but the first written mention of the castle with the pool court dates back to 1318. In 1720, its owners, the Jesuits from Klatovy, built a baroque castle on the site of the partially demolished castle. It is a one-story building with a D-shaped floor plan and a late baroque facade. Unique parquet floors are preserved inside. Later, the castle housed a special school with a boarding school and finally the district archive. Today, the Střela castle with the park is once again in private ownership. The castle and the granary below it are protected as Cultural Monuments of the Czech Republic.

== Gallery ==
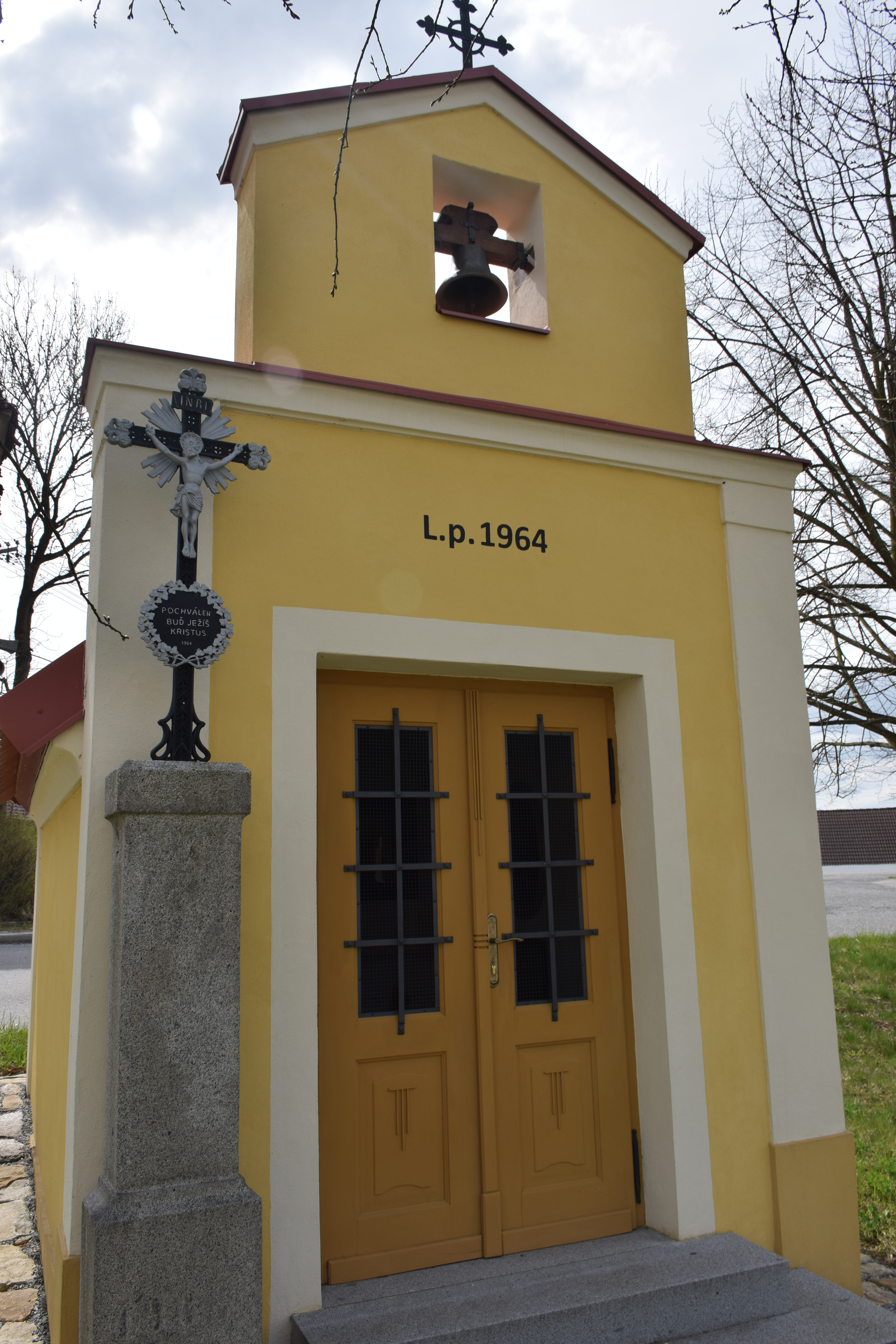
Village chapel

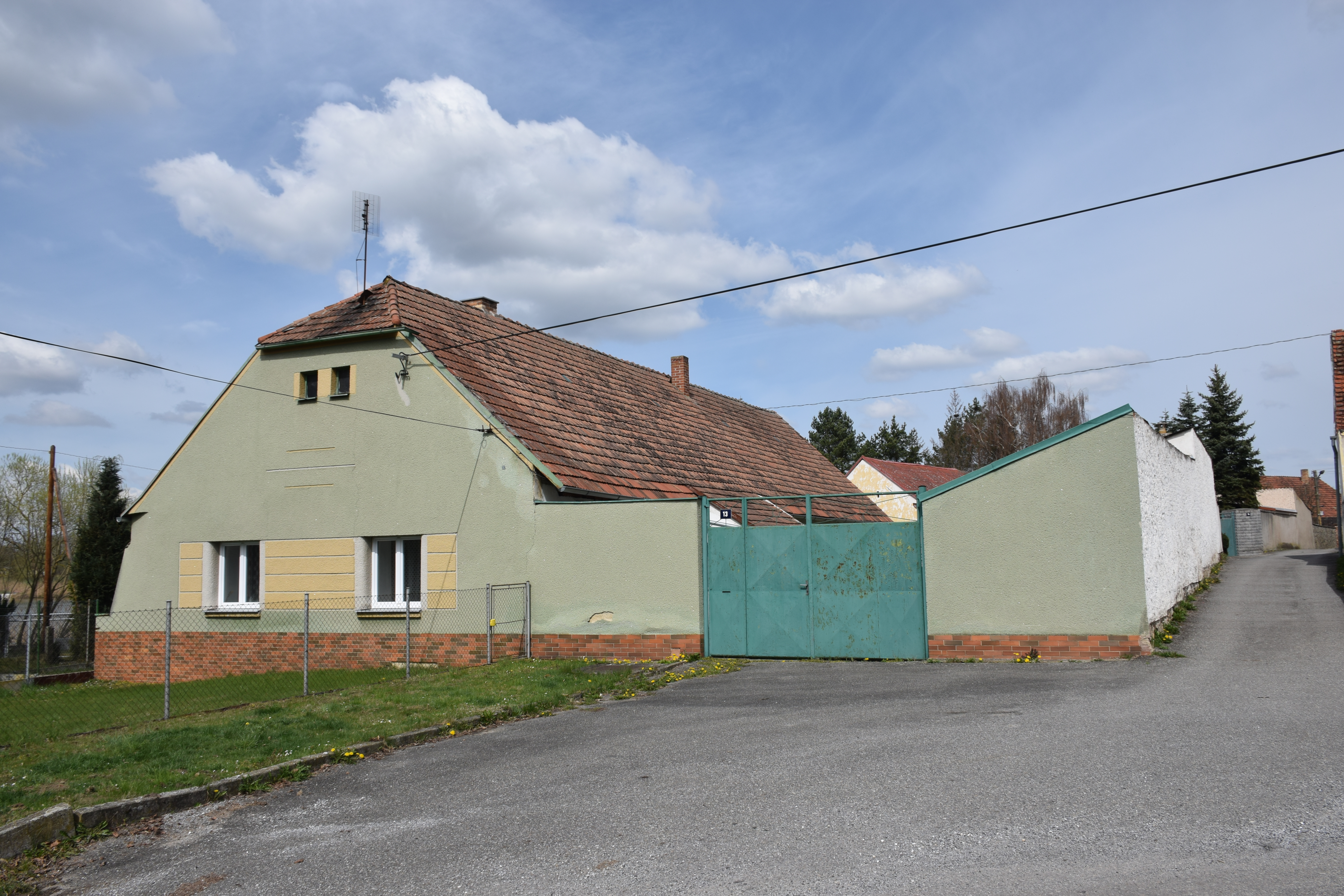
A house on the village square

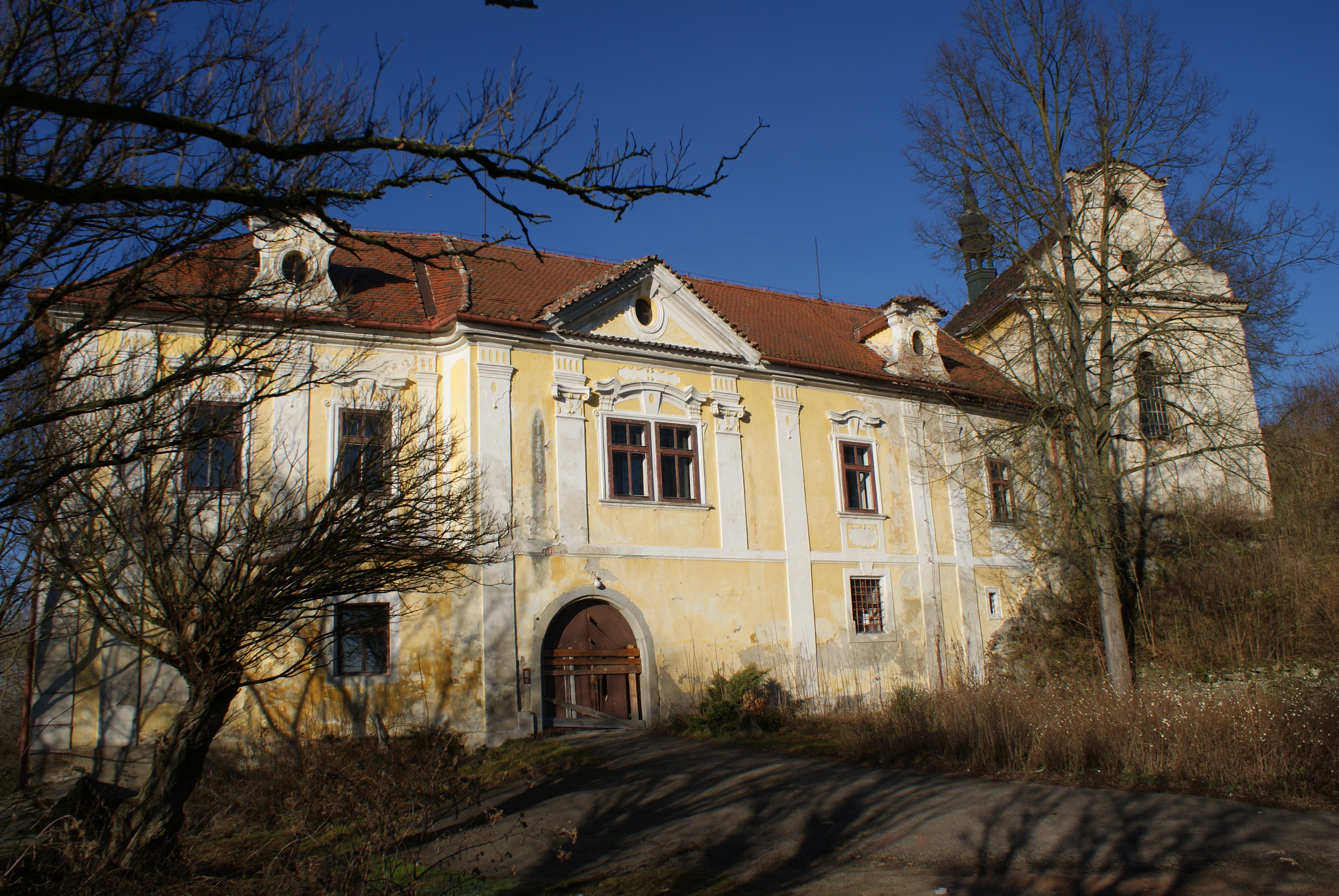
Baroque castle with the chapel

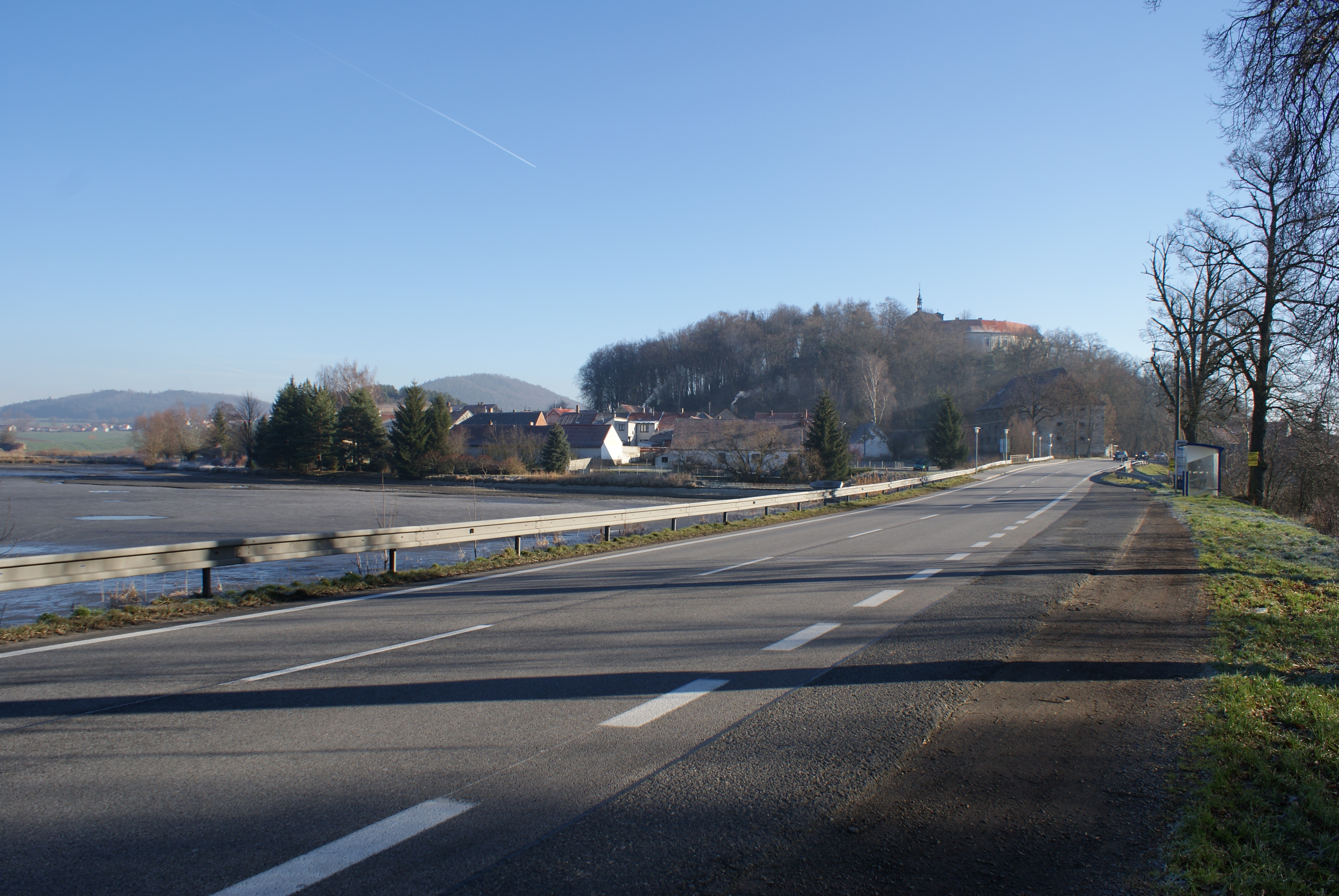
Střela as seen from the west. Main road in the front, pond on the left, village with grannary and castle on the hill covered by tree canopies

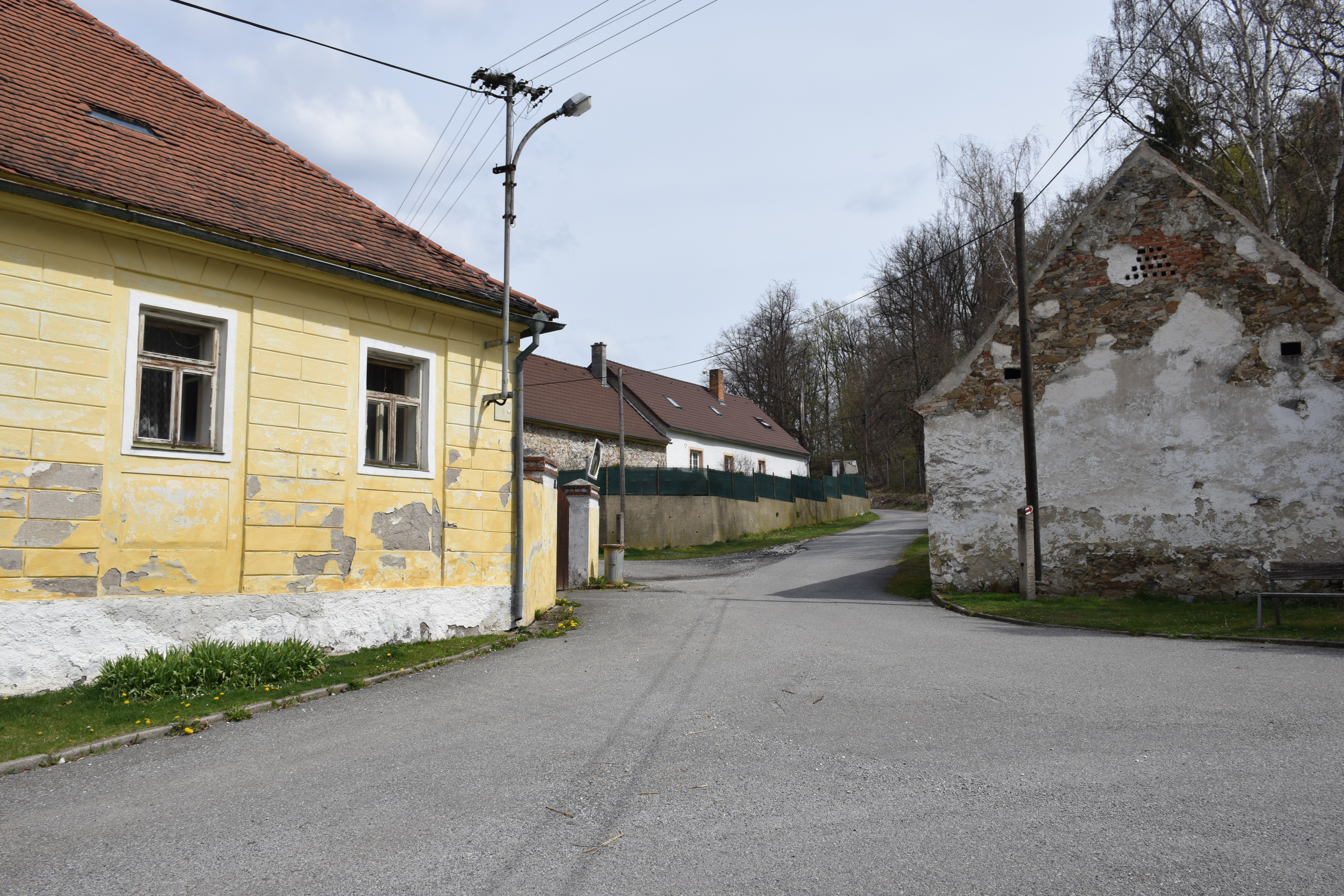
Road in the village
