= Tůně u Hajské =

- IUCN category IV (habitat/species management area)
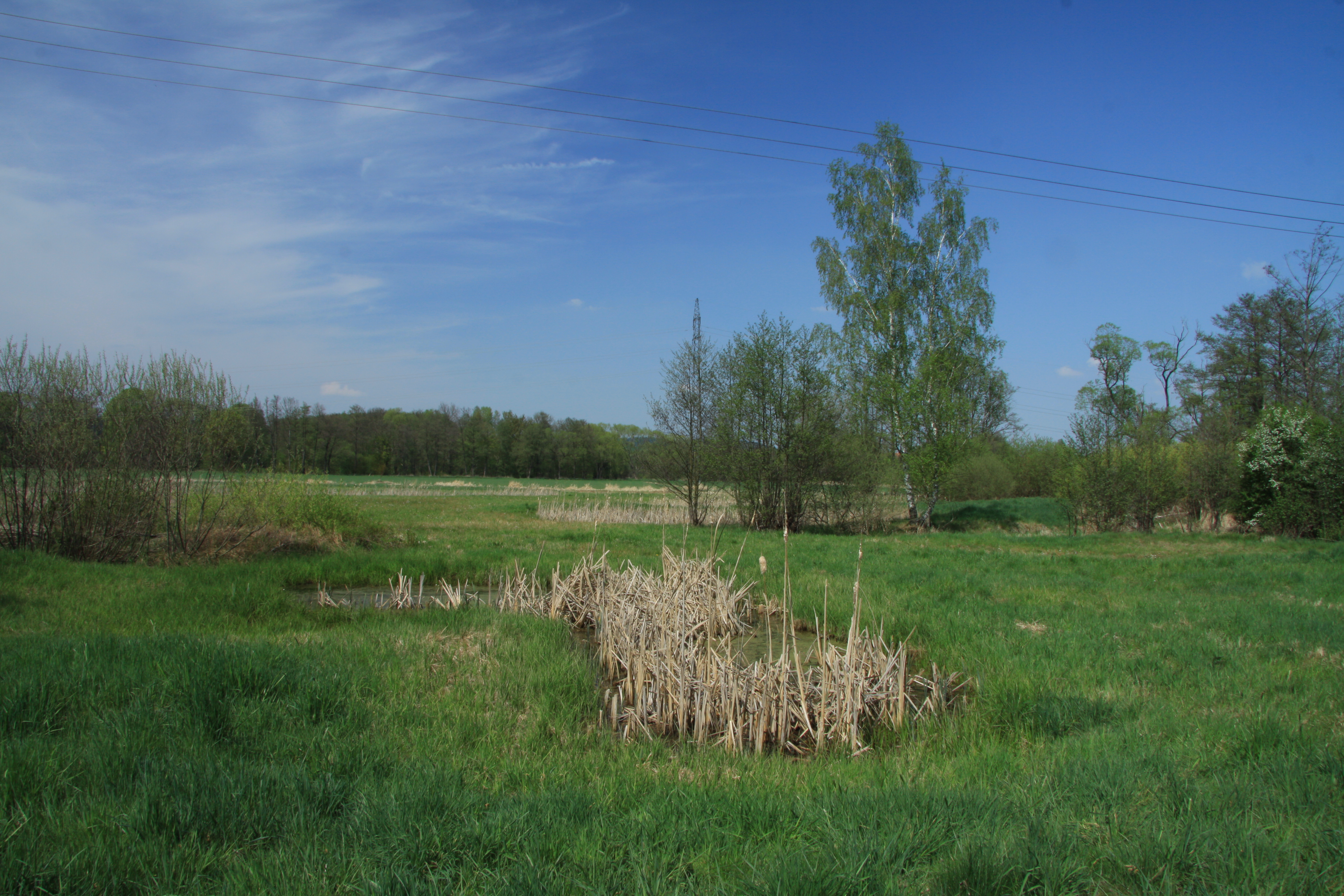
- Tůně u Hajské in spring

- Location within Czech Republic
- Location: South Bohemian Region, Czech Republic
- Nearest town: Strakonice
- Coordinates: 49°15′35″N 13°56′41″E
- Area: 6.633 ha (16.39 acres)
- Max. elevation: 390 m (1,280 ft)
- Min. elevation: 387 m (1,270 ft)
- Established: 1 December 1985
- Operator: AOPK ČR

Tůně u Hajské is nature monument in the territory of Strakonice in the South Bohemian Region of the Czech Republic. It has an area of 6.63 ha (16.4 acres).

The area is protected due to large amount of small pools in Otava river floodplain which were formed as a result of gold mining in the Middle Ages. These pools are containing habitat of critically endangered aquatic plant Hottonia palustris and many representatives of amphibian species as Bufo bufo, Bufo viridis, Bombina bombina, Hyla arborea, Pelophylax esculentus and Rana ridibunda.
