= Strakonice =

- Town
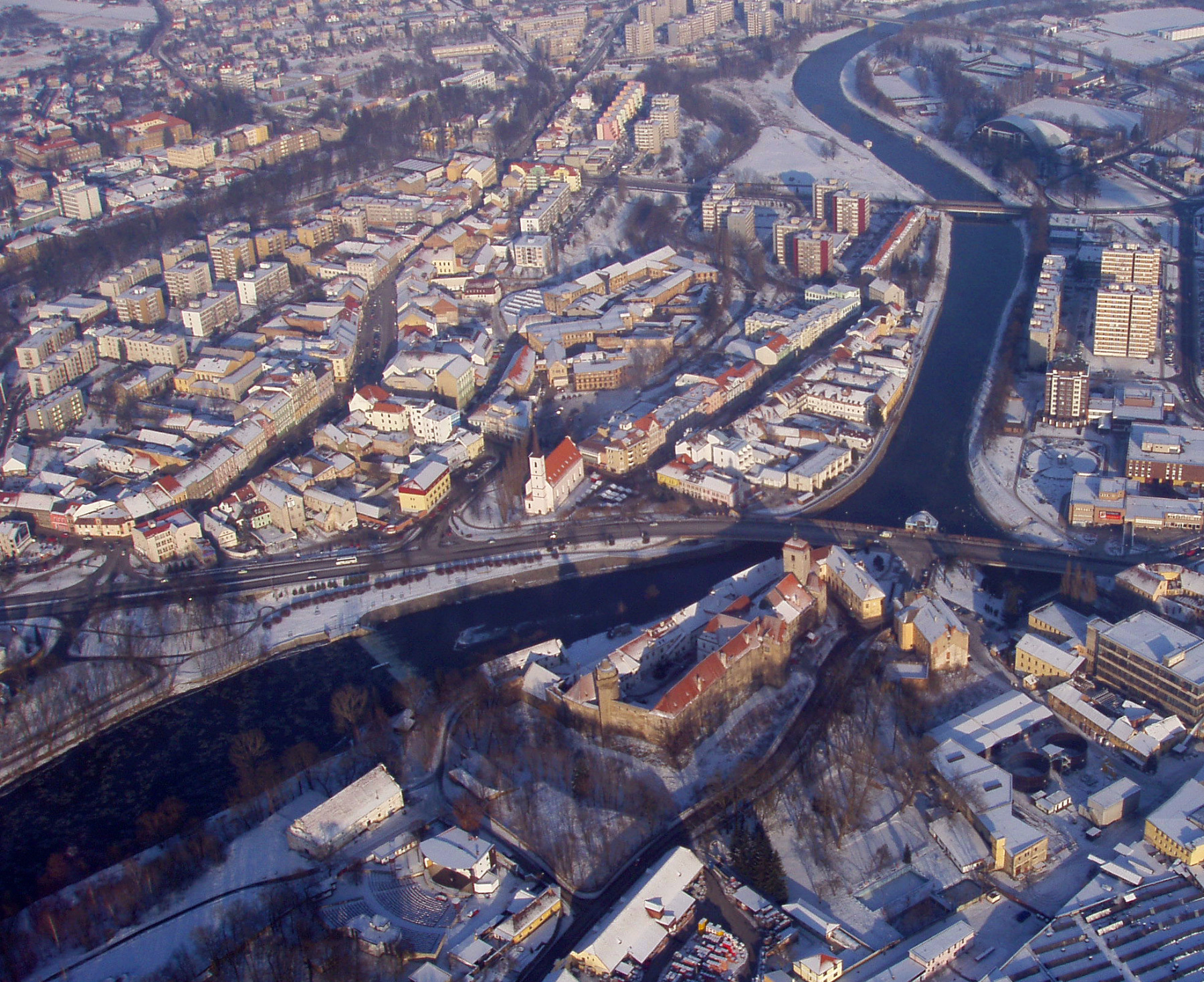
- Aerial view

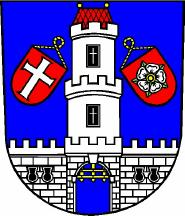
- Flag Coat of arms

- Location in the Czech Republic
- Coordinates: 49°15′41″N 13°54′9″E
- Country: Czech Republic
- Region: South Bohemian
- District: Strakonice
- First mentioned: 1243

Government
  - Mayor: Tomáš Dunovský

Area
  - Total: 34.68 km^{2} (13.39 sq mi)
- Elevation: 393 m (1,289 ft)

Population (2026-01-01)
  - Total: 22,275
  - Density: 642.3/km^{2} (1,664/sq mi)
- Time zone: UTC+1 (CET)
  - Summer (DST): UTC+2 (CEST)
- Postal code: 386 01
- Website: www.strakonice.eu

Strakonice (Czech pronunciation: [ˈstrakoɲɪtsɛ]; German: Strakonitz) is a town in the South Bohemian Region of the Czech Republic. It has about 22,000 inhabitants. The town is located at the confluence of the Volyňka and Otava rivers.

Strakonice's feudal history is closely linked to the Knights Hospitaller. The main landmark of the town is the Strakonice Castle, protected as a national cultural monument. The town has seen rapid industrialisation and urbanisation in the 19th and 20th centuries leading to the loss of many historical buildings and contributing to its modernist appearance. Strakonice is a regional industrial centre, historically known for its engineering and textile industries. It hosts the biennial International Bagpipe Festival.

== Administrative division ==
Strakonice consists of eight municipal parts (in brackets population according to the 2021 census):

- Strakonice I (13,395)
- Strakonice II (4,527)
- Dražejov (1,384)
- Hajská (63)
- Modlešovice (188)
- Přední Ptákovice (2,190)
- Střela (85)
- Virt (77)

== Etymology ==
The name Strakonice is derived from the personal name Strakoň, meaning "the village of Strakoň's people".

== Geography ==
Strakonice is located about 51 kilometres (32 mi) northwest of České Budějovice. It lies mostly in the northern tip of the České Budějovice Basin, but the municipal territory also extends to the Blatná Uplands on the north and to the Bohemian Forest Foothills on the south. The highest point is the hill Velká Kakada at 564 m (1,850 ft) above sea level, located in the southern part of Strakonice's territory.

The town is situated at the confluence of the Volyňka and Otava rivers. There are several fishponds in the area, the largest of which are Velkoholský rybník and Blatský rybník. Among the small-scale protected areas in Strakonice are Bažantnice u Pracejovic Nature Reserve and the Tůně u Hajské Nature Monument.

=== Climate ===
Strakonice has a cool, wet, and temperate inland variant of the humid continental climate (Dfb).

Climate data for Strakonice
Month	Jan	Feb	Mar	Apr	May	Jun	Jul	Aug	Sep	Oct	Nov	Dec	Year
Mean daily maximum °C (°F)	0.8 (33.4)	2.5 (36.5)	8.3 (46.9)	13.5 (56.3)	18.7 (65.7)	21.8 (71.2)	23.6 (74.5)	23.0 (73.4)	19.2 (66.6)	13.0 (55.4)	6.0 (42.8)	2.4 (36.3)	12.7 (54.9)
Daily mean °C (°F)	−2.3 (27.9)	−1.2 (29.8)	3.5 (38.3)	7.9 (46.2)	12.8 (55.0)	16.0 (60.8)	17.8 (64.0)	17.2 (63.0)	13.7 (56.7)	8.3 (46.9)	3.0 (37.4)	−0.3 (31.5)	8.0 (46.4)
Mean daily minimum °C (°F)	−5.4 (22.3)	−4.9 (23.2)	−1.2 (29.8)	2.4 (36.3)	6.9 (44.4)	10.3 (50.5)	12.0 (53.6)	11.5 (52.7)	8.2 (46.8)	3.7 (38.7)	0.0 (32.0)	−3.0 (26.6)	3.4 (38.1)
Average precipitation mm (inches)	48 (1.9)	40 (1.6)	45 (1.8)	46 (1.8)	75 (3.0)	83 (3.3)	92 (3.6)	81 (3.2)	58 (2.3)	45 (1.8)	45 (1.8)	54 (2.1)	712 (28.0)
Source: Climate-Data.org

== History ==
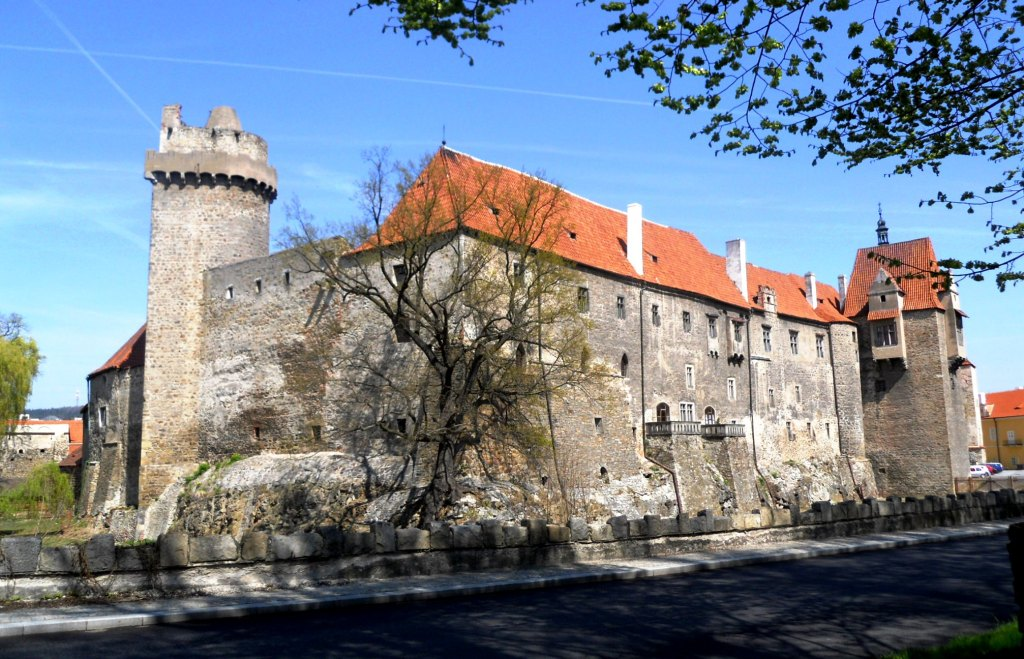
Strakonice Castle

A moated castle on the Otava River was built by the noble family of Bavors of Strakonice at the beginning of the 13th century. The first written mention of the castle is from 1235. The first written mention of the village of Strakonice is from 1243, when the Church of Saint Wenceslaus already existed and the Bavors donated part of the castle and several nearby villages to the Knights Hospitaller of the Order of Saint John. By 1318, Strakonice was already a town.

By 1402, the Knights Hospitaller owned the entire castle, including the town and the surrounding estate. In 1420, the Hussite commander Jan Žižka occupied Strakonice but failed to capture the castle. Strakonice Castle underwent an extensive reconstruction in the 16th century, becoming a representative residence for the Order's Grand Priors. Subsequent alterations were minor. After the Thirty Years' War, the castle lost its significance.

The town was industrialised during the course of the 19th century. In the 1860s, a railway line connecting České Budějovice and Plzeň via Strakonice was built, which spurred its economic development.

== Demographics ==
Strakonice experienced its greatest population growth between 1950 and 1980, when the town's population nearly doubled as a result of further industrialisation, particularly at Česká zbrojovka Strakonice and Fezko. The consolidation of agriculture and rapid urbanisation during the communist era helped make Strakonice one of the fastest growing towns in the region.

Historical population

Year	Pop.	±%
1869	8,327	—
1880	9,246	+11.0%
1890	8,733	−5.5%
1900	8,789	+0.6%
1910	8,715	−0.8%

Year	Pop.	±%
1921	9,001	+3.3%
1930	11,398	+26.6%
1950	12,056	+5.8%
1961	14,297	+18.6%
1970	17,478	+22.2%

Year	Pop.	±%
1980	21,731	+24.3%
1991	24,705	+13.7%
2001	23,800	−3.7%
2011	22,690	−4.7%
2021	21,909	−3.4%

Source: Censuses

== Economy ==
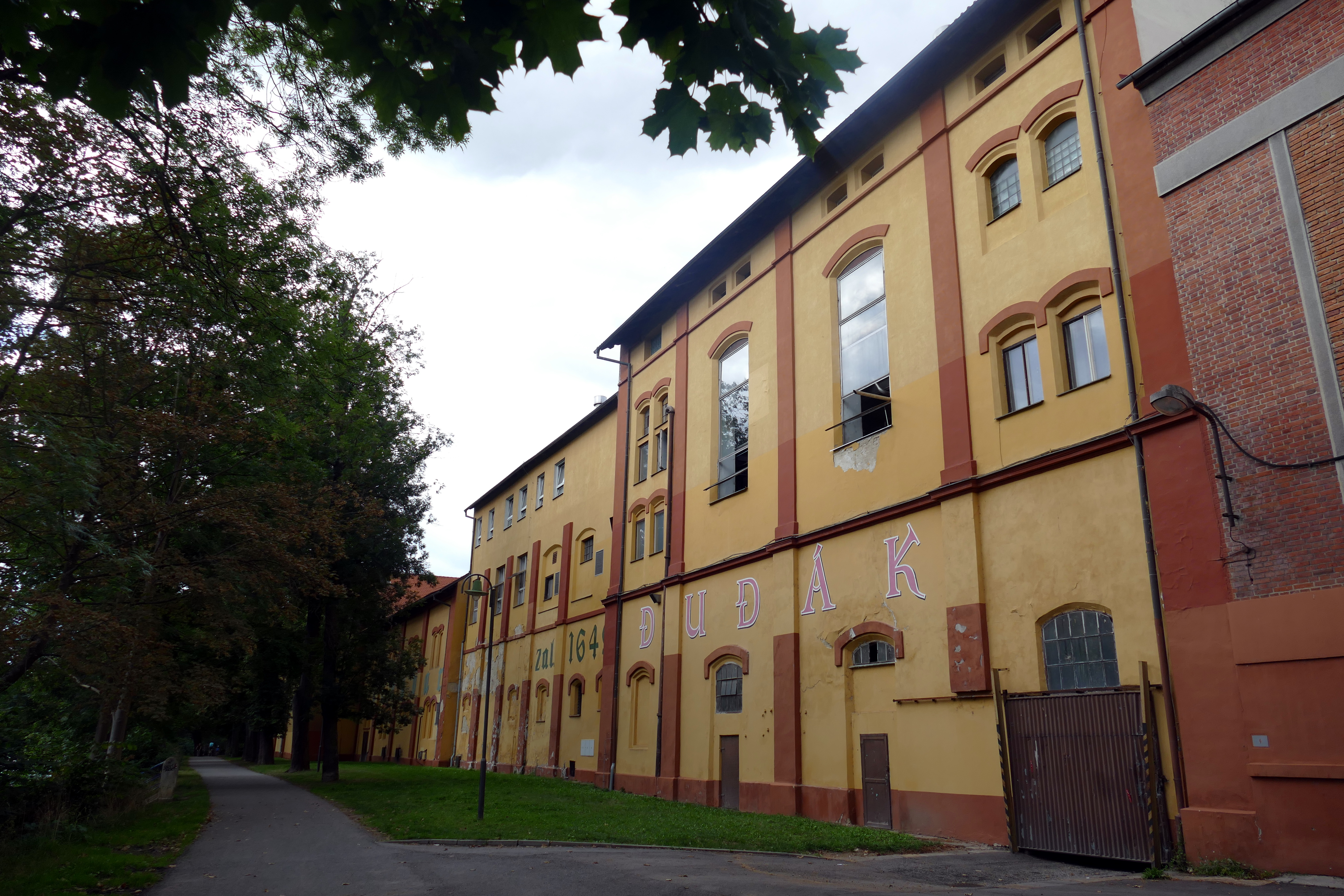
Dudák – Burghers' Brewery Strakonice

Strakonice is known for fez manufacture that dates back to the 19th century, and it has established itself as a small arms and motorbike manufacturing hub. Along with České Budějovice, Tábor, and Písek, Strakonice is considered one of the main industrial centres of South Bohemia.

Strakonice is also known for its brewery called Dudák – Měšťanský pivovar Strakonice (lit. 'burghers' brewery Strakonice'), located near the castle. It produces beer under the Strakonický Dudák brand. The brewery is owned by the municipality, making it the last one of its kind in the Czech Republic. The beer brewing tradition in Strakonice dates back to 1367 and Burghers' Brewery was founded in 1649.

== Transport ==
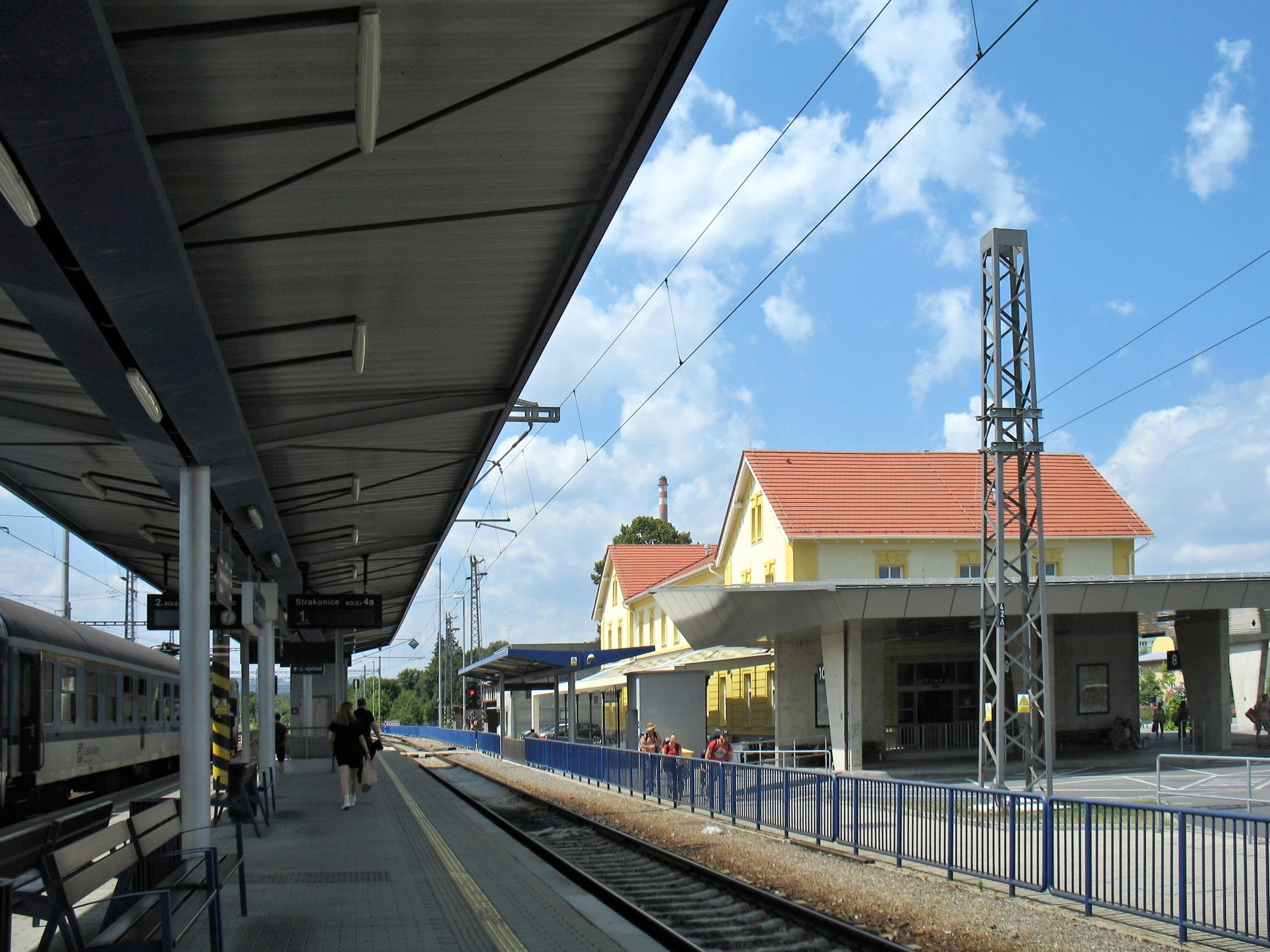
Train station with bus terminal

Two main roads pass through Strakonice: the I/4 road, which connects the D4 motorway with the Czech–German border in Strážný, and the I/22 road in the section from Klatovy to Vodňany.

A nationally important railway line from Brno to Plzeň (via České Budějovice) runs through Strakonice. From Strakonice, railway lines branch off to Beroun, Milevsko, Blatná and Volary.

== Culture ==
International Bagpipe Festival, 2018

Every two years, the town hosts the International Bagpipe Festival. The town's bagpipe tradition goes back to the work of Josef Kajetán Tyl Strakonický dudák ("The Bagpiper of Strakonice"). The festival has been held since 1967 and is one of the most notable folklore festivals in the world.

== Sights ==
The majority of Strakonice's historic buildings were demolished during the 20th century. The Strakonice Castle is its principal landmark and is protected as a national cultural monument. Today, it serves as a regional museum and art gallery, featuring exhibitions focusing on motorcycles, small arms, bagpipes, and the traditional fez hat production. The Rumpál Tower serves as a lookout. The Church of Saint Procopius, which is part of the castle complex, was originally a Romanesque building, later rebuilt in the Baroque style with Rococo elements.

The Church of Saint Margaret was built in 1580–1583 in the late Gothic style with many Renaissance elements. Baroque modifications were incorporated in 1777. It is one of the town centre's main landmarks.

The Church of Saint Wenceslaus was originally a medieval Gothic church, founded in the 14th century. It was rebuilt in the Baroque style in 1720–1730 and serves as a cemetery church.

The Church of the Virgin Mary is a pilgrimage site located in Přední Ptákovice. It was built in 1771–1774, when it replaced a chapel that dated back to 1749.

== Gallery ==
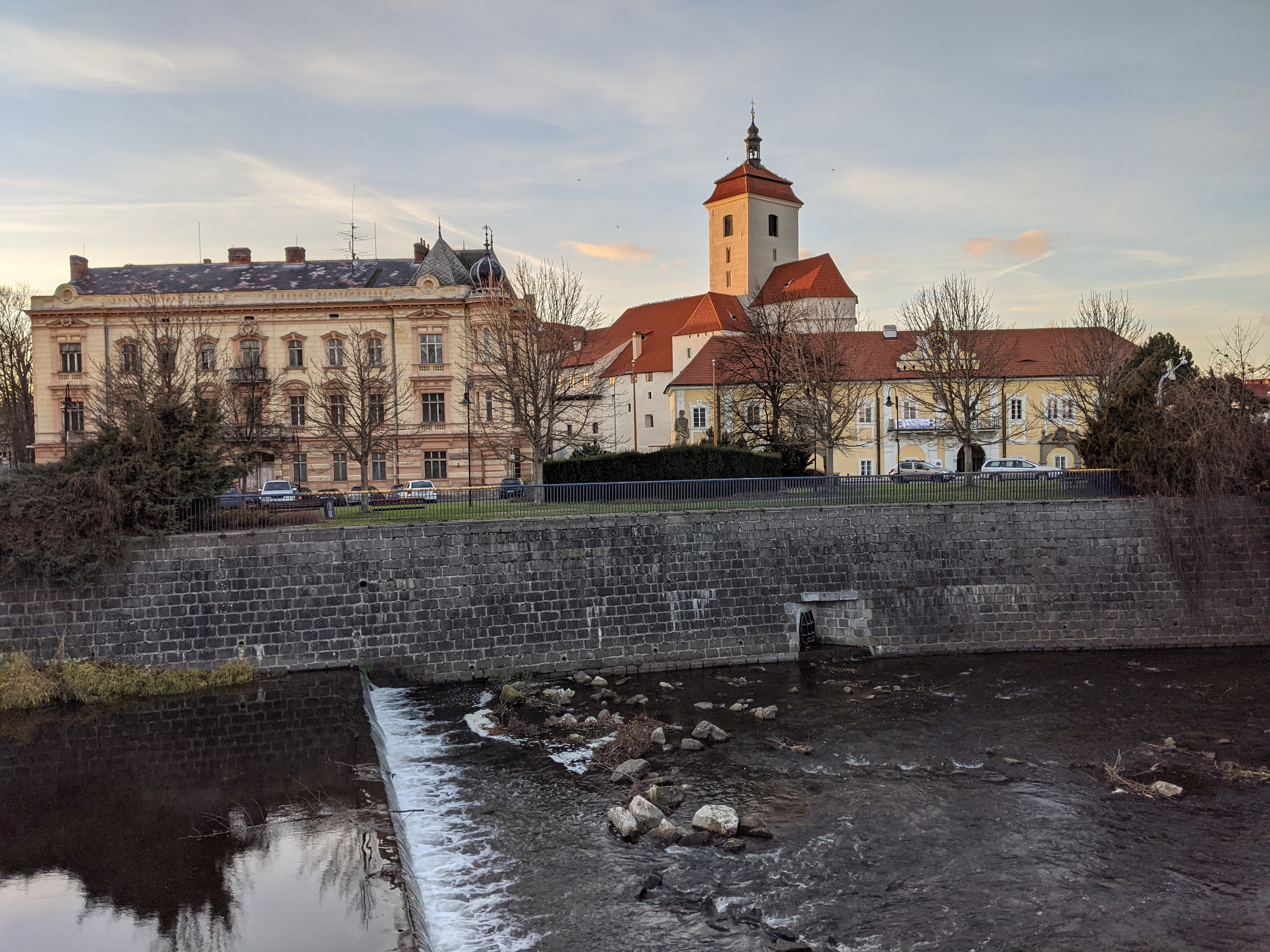
Strakonice Castle

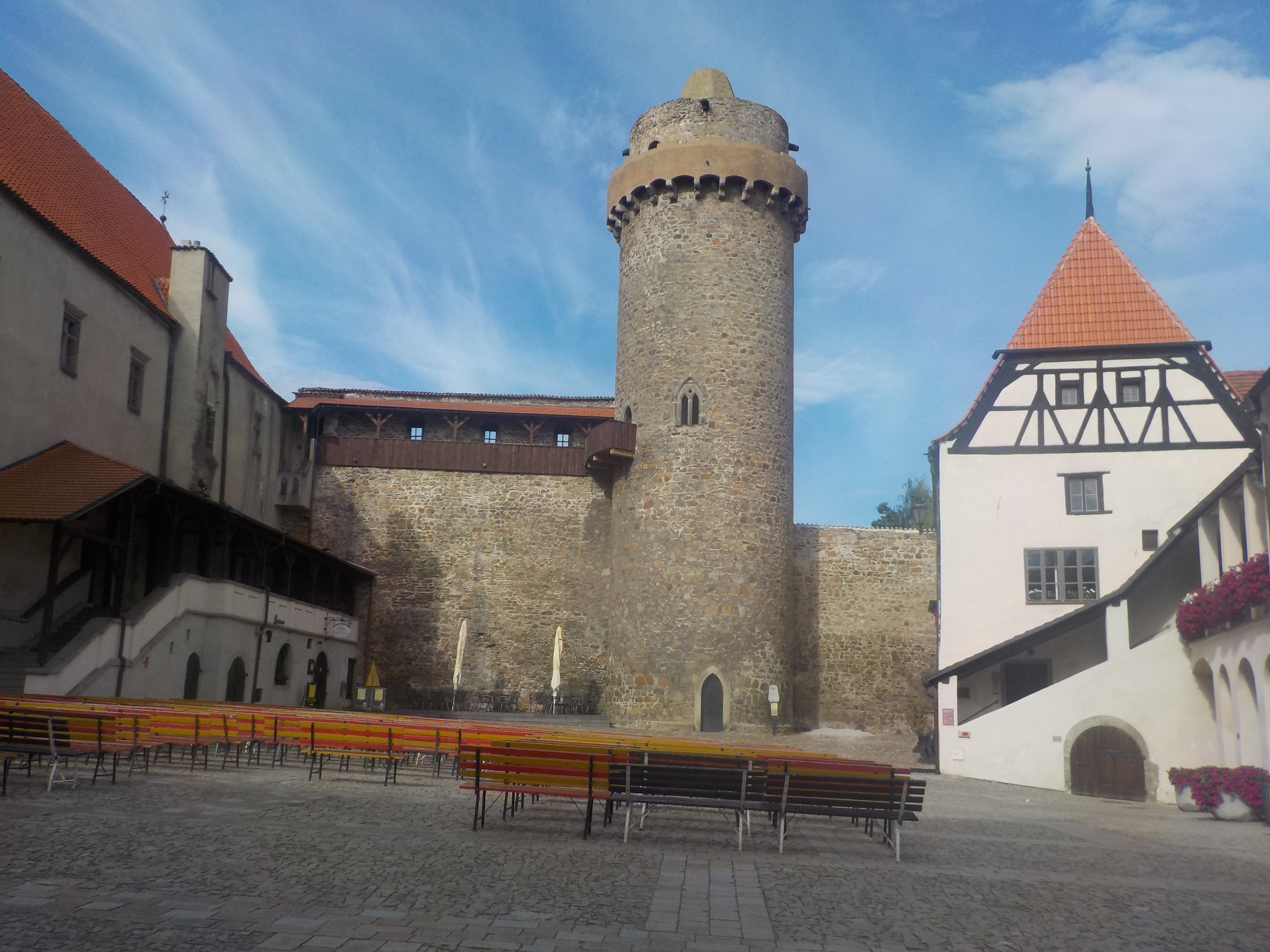
Rumpál Tower

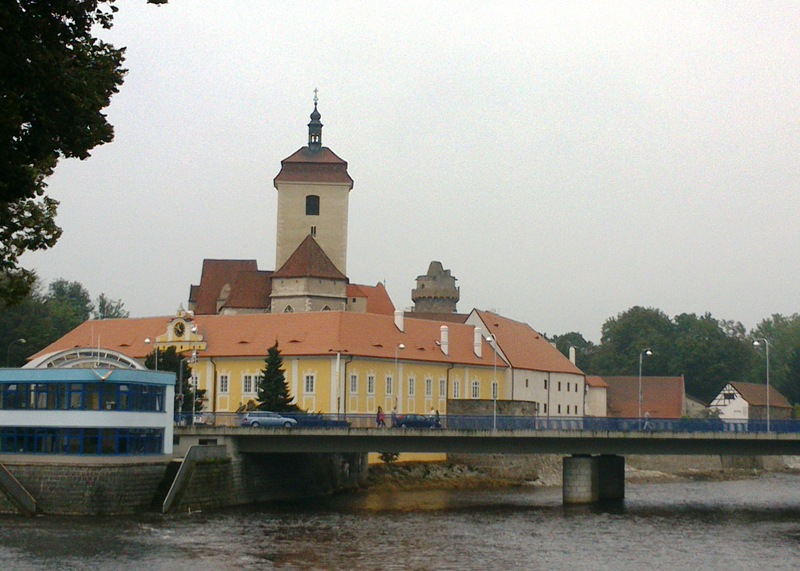
Church of Saint Procopius

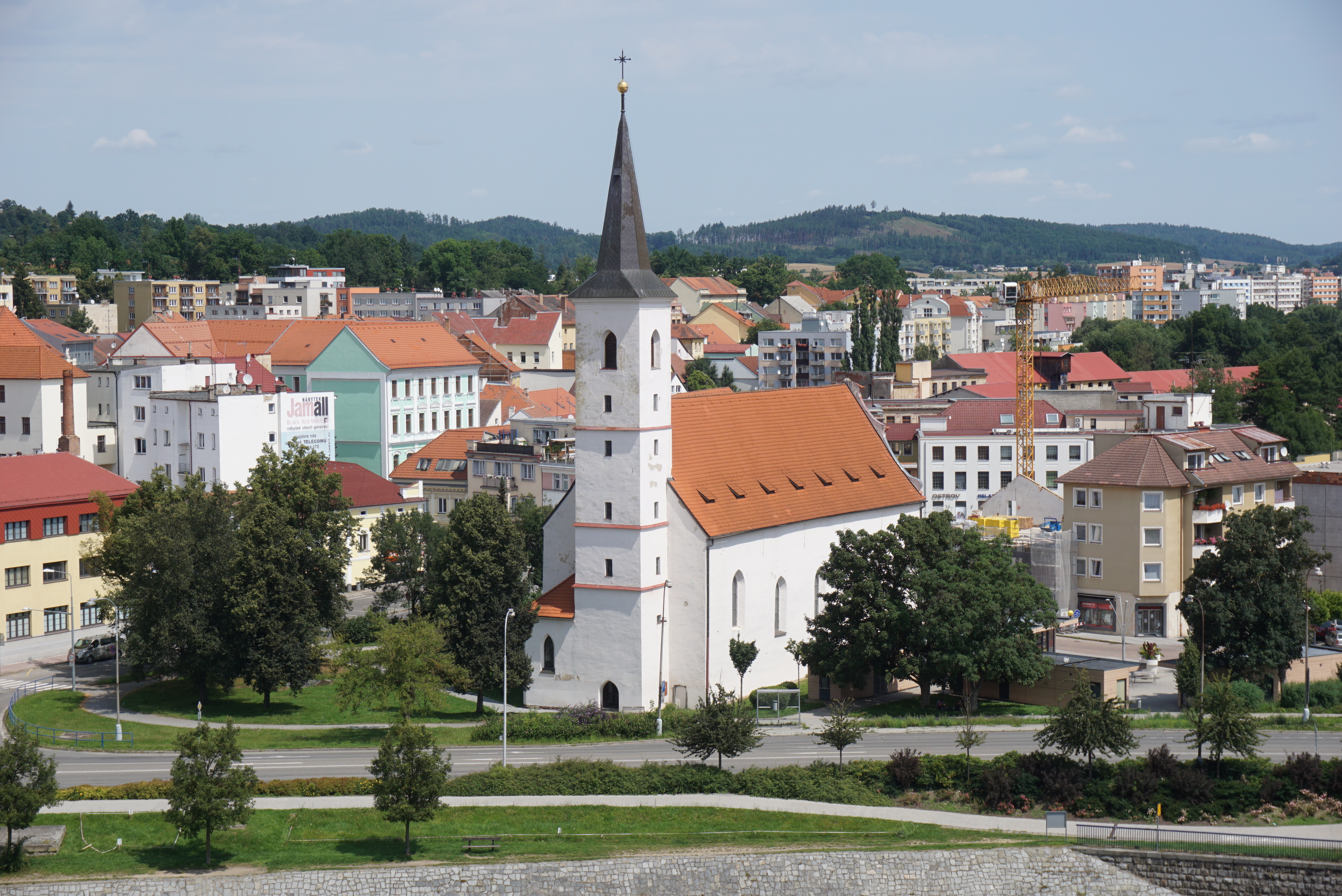
Church of Saint Margaret

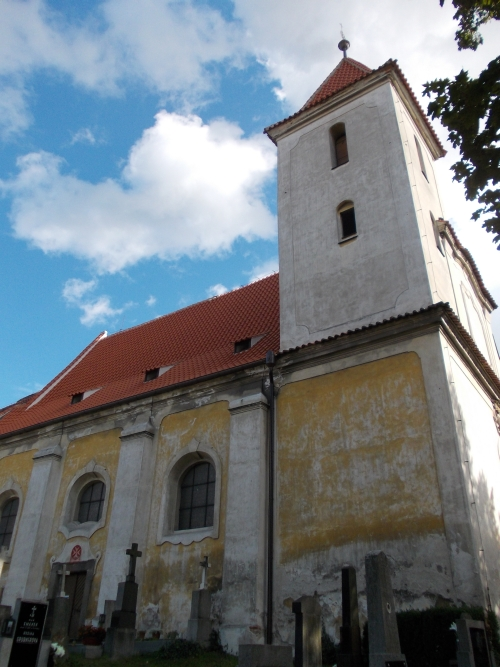
Church of Saint Wenceslaus

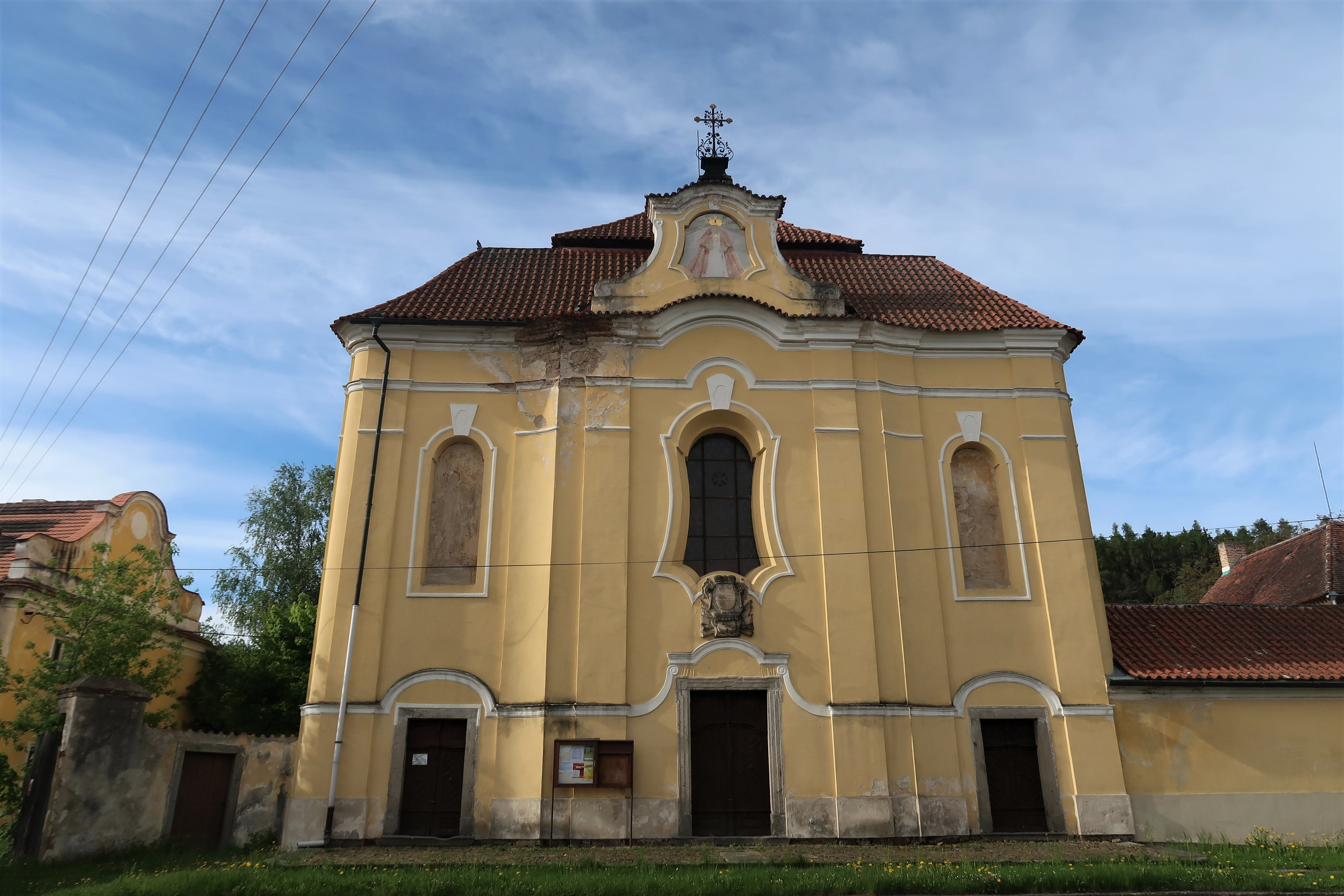
Church of the Virgin Mary in Přední Ptákovice

== Notable people ==
- Jan Antonín Losy (c. 1650 – 1721), lute player and composer
- František Čelakovský (1799–1852), writer and translator
- Martin Mathias Secor (1841–1911), American businessman
- Leopold Ehrmann (1886–1951), architect
- Riccardo Pick-Mangiagalli (1882–1949), Italian composer
- Xena Longenová (1891–1928), actress
- Josef Skupa (1892–1957), puppeteer
- Věra Machoninová (born 1928), architect
- Marie Poledňáková (1941–2022), film director
- Pavel Pavel (born 1957), engineer and experimental archaeologist
- Roman Turek (born 1970), ice hockey player
- Milena Králíčková (born 1972), medical doctor and university professor
- Alexander Salák (born 1987), ice hockey player
- Zdeněk Ondrášek (born 1988), footballer
- Jindřich Staněk (born 1996), footballer
- Tereza Vanišová (born 1996), ice hockey player
- Vít Krejčí (born 2000), basketball player

== Twin towns – sister cities ==
Strakonice is twinned with:

- Bad Salzungen, Germany
- Calderdale, England, United Kingdom
- Lengnau, Switzerland

Strakonice also has friendly relations with Rawicz in Poland.
