= Lomnice (river) =

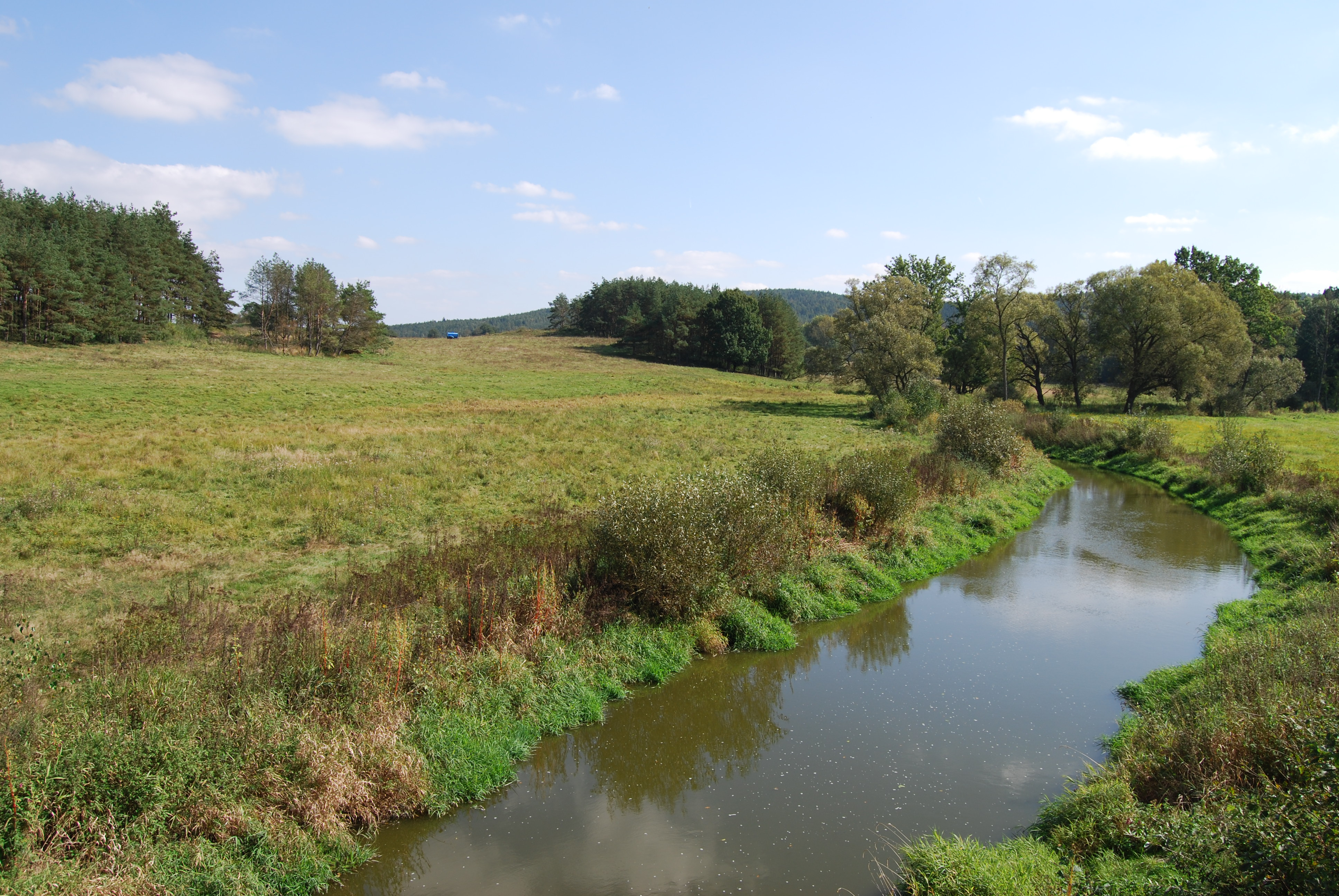
- The Lomnice near Lom-Míreč

Location
- Country: Czech Republic
- Regions: South Bohemian; Plzeň; Central Bohemian

Physical characteristics
- Source
  - location: Rožmitál pod Třemšínem, Brdy Highlands
  - coordinates: 49°34′29″N 13°46′20″E
  - elevation: 745 m (2,444 ft)
- Mouth
  - location: Otava
  - coordinates: 49°24′26″N 14°10′54″E
  - elevation: 349 m (1,145 ft)
- Length: 59.3 km (36.8 mi)
- Basin size: 830.7 km^{2} (320.7 sq mi)
- Discharge
  - average: 3.28 m^{3}/s (116 cu ft/s) near estuary

Basin features
- Progression: Otava→ Vltava→ Elbe→ North Sea

The Lomnice (Czech pronunciation: [ˈlomɲɪtsɛ]; also called Smolivecký potok and Jesec upstream) is a river in the Czech Republic, a left tributary of the Otava River. It flows through the Central Bohemian, Plzeň and South Bohemian regions. It is 59.3 km (36.8 mi) long.

== Etymology ==
The adjective lomný denoted a frequently bending river, but also a stone suitable for quarrying. This could refer to the character of the river bed, which contained gold.

== Characteristic ==
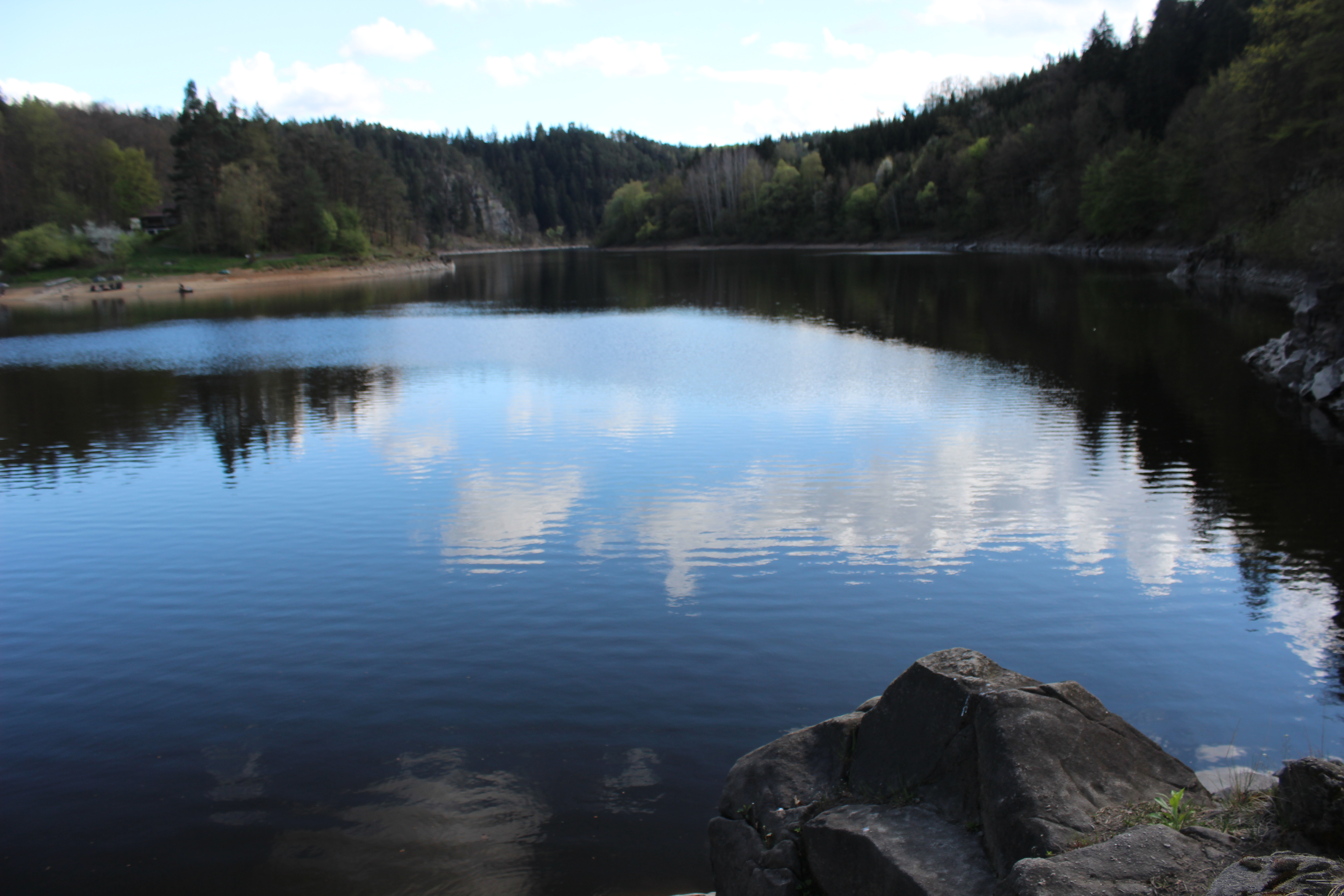
Confluence of the Lomnice (left) and Otava

The Lomnice originates in the territory of Rožmitál pod Třemšínem in the Brdy Highlands at an elevation of 745 m (2,444 ft) and flows to Oslov, where it enters the Otava River at an elevation of 349 m (1,145 ft). It is 59.3 km (36.8 mi) long. Its drainage basin has an area of 830.7 km^{2} (320.7 sq mi).

The longest tributaries of the Lomnice are:

Tributary	Length (km)	Side
Skalice	52.3	left
Závišínský potok	21.9	left
Kostratecký potok	16.9	left
Jesenický potok	16.1	right
Mračovský potok	14.4	right
Hajanský potok	12.0	left
Hradišťský potok	11.1	right
Pálenecký potok	9.3	right

== Course ==
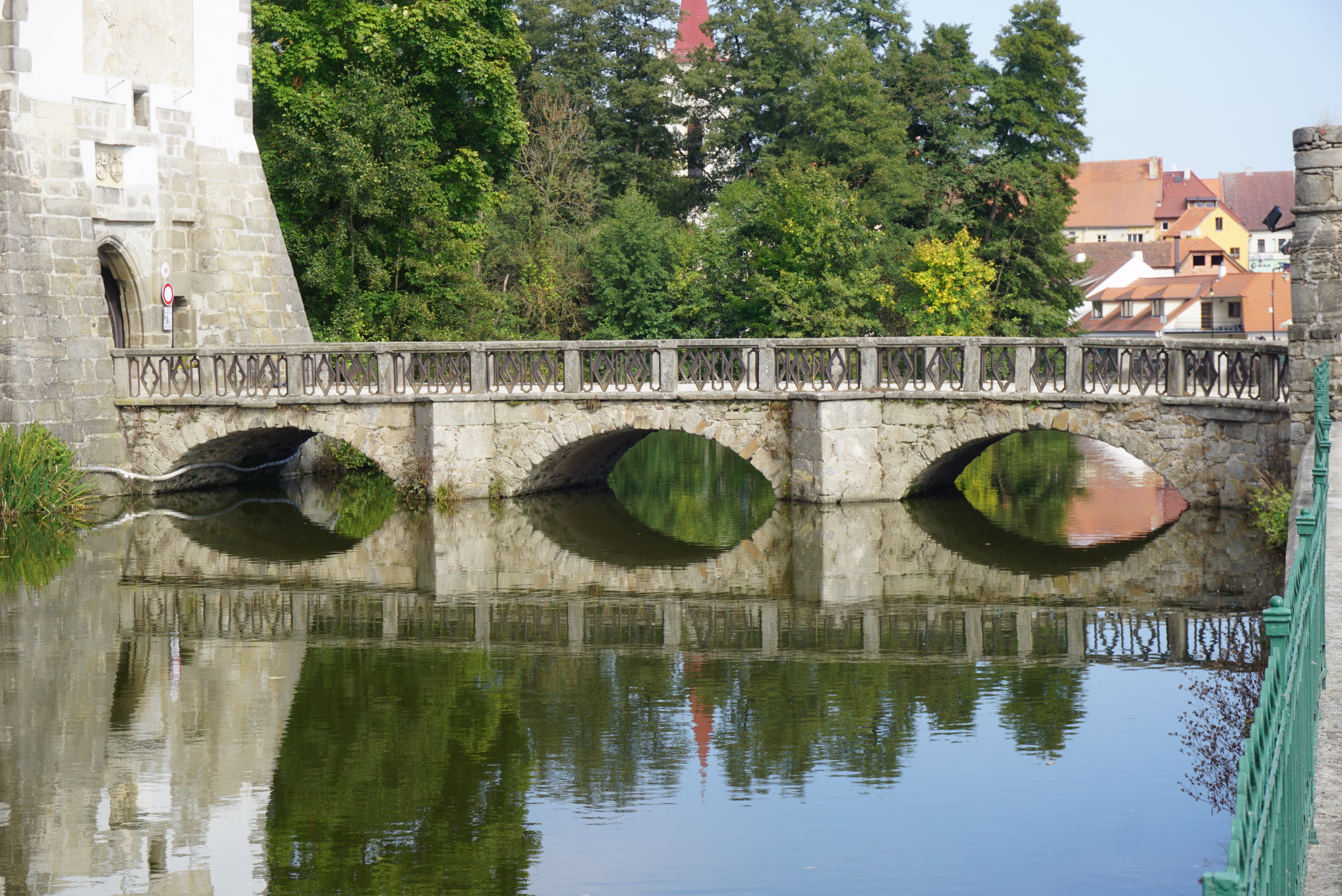
Bridge over the Lomnice to the Blatná Castle

The most important settlement on the river is the town of Blatná. The river flows through the municipal territories of Rožmitál pod Třemšínem, Hvožďany, Mladý Smolivec, Předmíř, Lnáře, Tchořovice, Blatná, Buzice, Myštice, Lom, Mirotice, Smetanova Lhota, Ostrovec, Varvažov and Oslov.

== Bodies of water ==
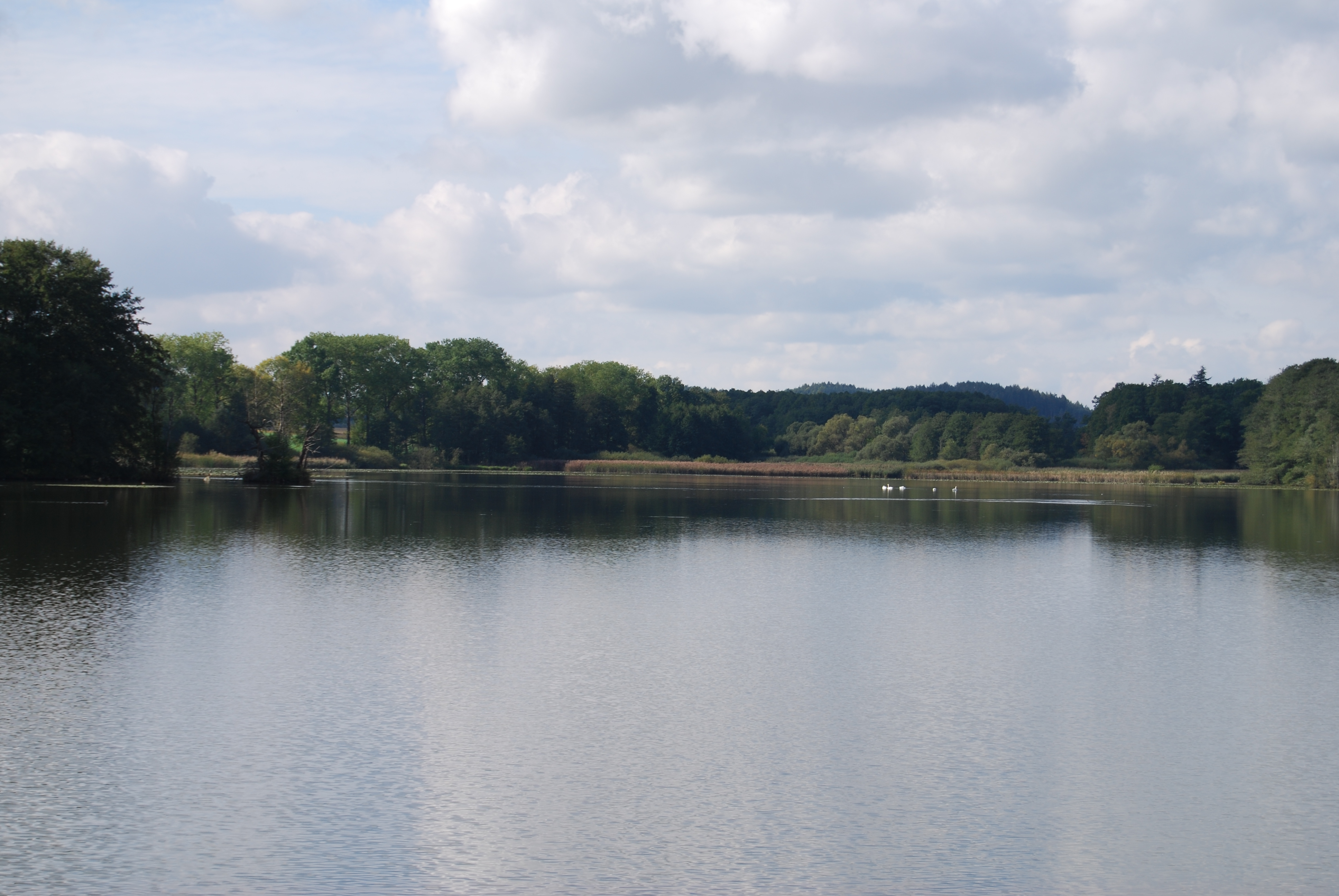
Hořejší rybník Nature Reserve

The drainage basin is rich in fishponds, especially in the area of the Blatná Uplands. There are 241 bodies of water in the basin area larger than 1 ha. The largest of them is the Labuť pond with an area of 101 ha (250 acres), built on the Kostratecký potok. Several fishponds are built directly on the Lomnice. The large Orlík Reservoir, built on the Vltava River, extends also into the river mouth of the Otava and Lomnice.

== Protection of nature ==
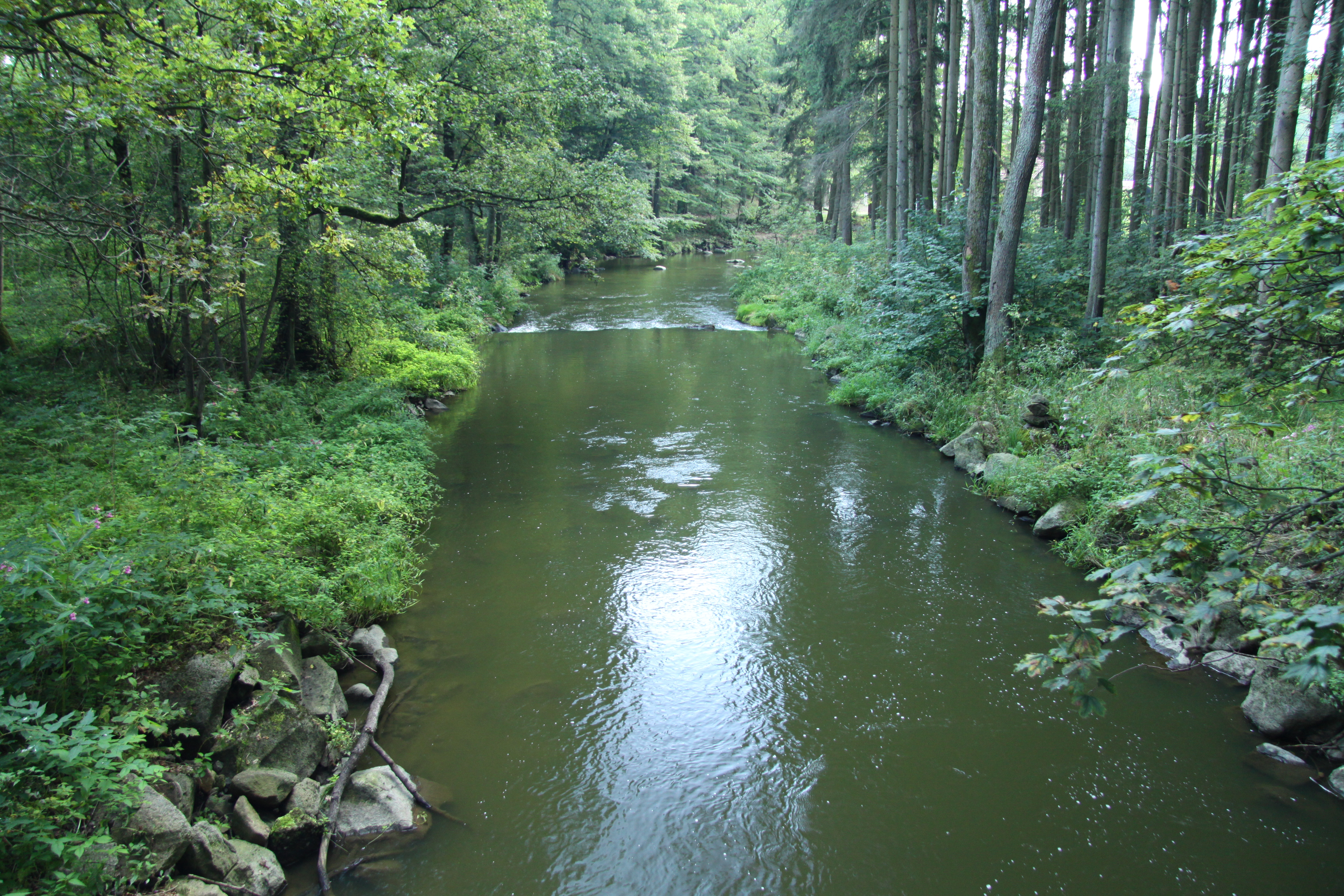
Vystrkov Nature Monument

The spring and the first kilometres of the Lomnice are located within the Brdy Protected Landscape Area. The river also flows through several small-scale protected areas.

The Hořejší rybník Nature Reserve protects the area of the fishpond Hořejší rybník and its surroundings, including the mouth of the Lomnice to the pond. The nature reserve has an area of 56.6 ha (140 acres). The object of protection is a pond ecosystem with very well-preserved littoral vegetation and adjacent mesophilic meadows and waterlogged alder forests, which has high biodiversity. Near Hořejší rybník is located the fishpond Dolejší rybník whose bank is protected as the Dolejší rybník Nature Reserve with an area of 6.5 ha (16 acres). It is an important site of non-forest bog vegetation.

In Blatná, the river flows through the Blatná Castle park, protected as the Blatná Nature Monument with an area of 43.8 ha (108 acres). It is a site with occurrence of rare and endangered species of animals, especially the hermit beetle, which is highly endangered within the country.

The Lomnice's river bed in the municipality of Smetanova Lhota is protected as the Vystrkov Nature Monument with an area of 2.8 ha (7 acres). It is a site with occurrence of rare and endangered species of plants and animals. A few hundred metres further downstream, the river bed is protected as the V Obouch Nature Monument with an area of 5.1 ha (13 acres). The reasons for protection are similar to Vystrkov.

== History ==
In the Middle Ages, the banks of the Lomnice were popular for gold panning. The so-called sejpy (man-made mounds that are the remains of gold panning) in the castle park in Blatná are protected as a cultural monument. Other protected sejpy, extending along the banks of the Lomnice, are located in the territories of Myštice and Lnáře.

== Tourism ==
The Lomnice is occasionally suitable for river tourism, but only in spring and after heavy rains. About 23 km (14 mi) of the river is navigable.

== See also ==
- List of rivers of the Czech Republic
