= Hvožďany =

Hvožďany may refer to places in the Czech Republic:

- Hvožďany (Domažlice District), a municipality and village in the Plzeň Region
- Hvožďany (Příbram District), a municipality and village in the Central Bohemian Region
- Hvožďany, a village and part of Bechyně in the South Bohemian Region
- Hvožďany, a village and part of Úněšov in the Plzeň Region
- Hvožďany, a village and part of Vodňany in the South Bohemian Region
