= Hvožďany (Příbram District) =

- Municipality
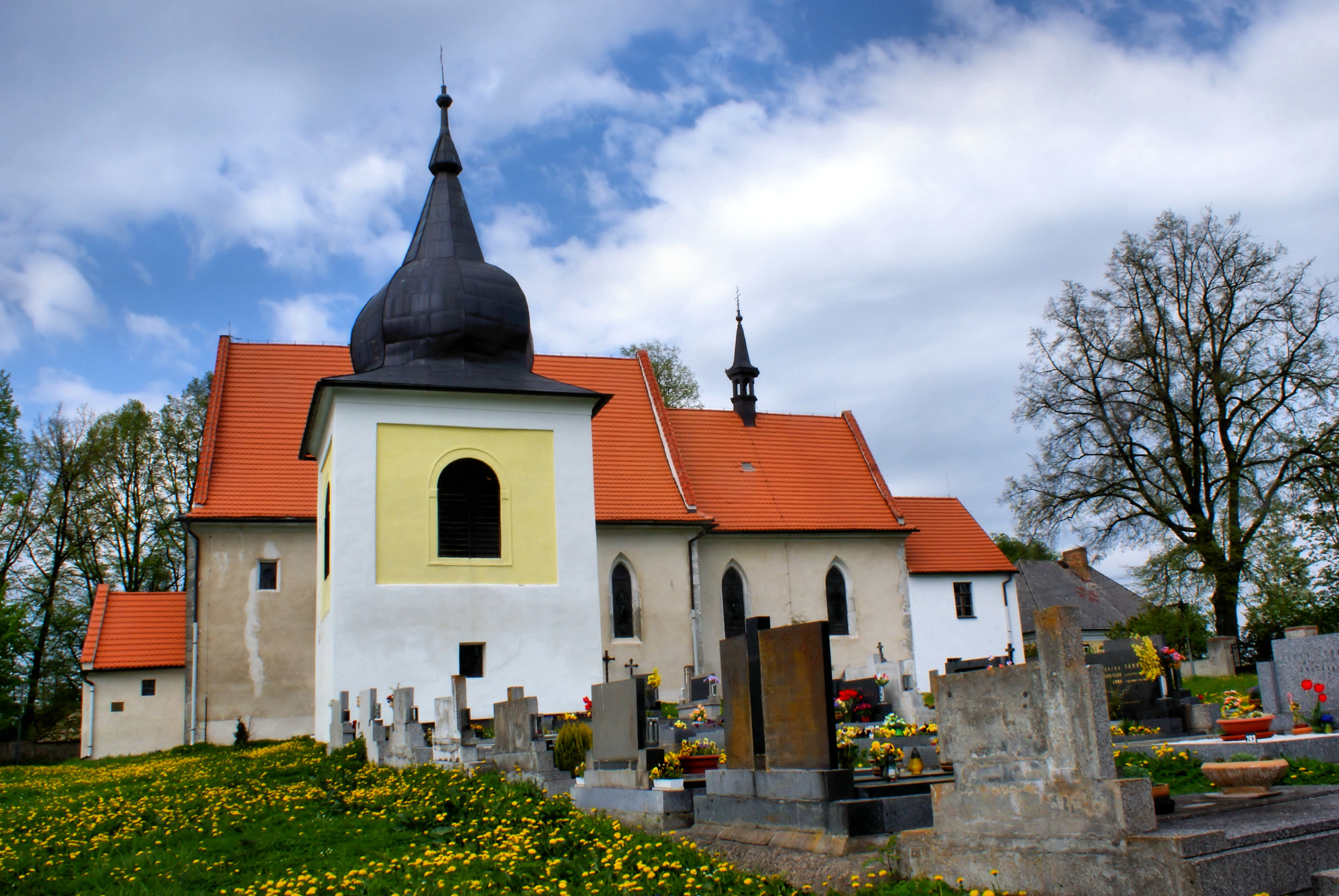
- Church of Saint Procopius and the Visitation of the Virgin Mary

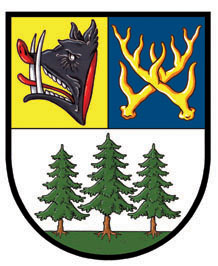
- Flag Coat of arms

- Location in the Czech Republic
- Coordinates: 49°31′42″N 13°48′19″E
- Country: Czech Republic
- Region: Central Bohemian
- District: Příbram
- First mentioned: 1352

Area
  - Total: 49.78 km^{2} (19.22 sq mi)
- Elevation: 533 m (1,749 ft)

Population (2026-01-01)
  - Total: 795
  - Density: 16.0/km^{2} (41.4/sq mi)
- Time zone: UTC+1 (CET)
  - Summer (DST): UTC+2 (CEST)
- Postal codes: 262 42, 262 44
- Website: www.hvozdany.cz

Hvožďany is a municipality and village in Příbram District in the Central Bohemian Region of the Czech Republic. It has about 800 inhabitants.

== Administrative division ==
Hvožďany consists of six municipal parts (in brackets population according to the 2021 census):

- Hvožďany (406)
- Leletice (57)
- Planiny (17)
- Pozdyně (31)
- Roželov (107)
- Vacíkov (109)

== Etymology ==
The name has the root in hvozd, which is an old Czech word for 'forest'. The term hvožďan denoted a person who lives in a forest or near a forest.

== Geography ==
Hvožďany is located about 21 kilometres (13 mi) southwest of Příbram and 71 km (44 mi) southwest of Prague. It lies on the border between three nature regions: Blatná Uplands (southwest, including the villages of Hvožďany and Pozdyně), Benešov Uplands (southeast, including Leletice) and Brdy Highlands (north). The highest point is at 780 m (2,560 ft) above sea level. The upper course of the Lomnice River flows through the woods in the northwestern part of the municipal territory. The stream Hvožďanský potok originates here and flows through the Hvožďany village. The southern part of the municipality is rich in fishponds.

== History ==
The first written mention of Hvožďany is from 1352, when a fortress and a church already stood here. From 1408 to 1472, the village was owned by the Lords of Třemšín. Among the next owners were various less important knight families. From 1666 until the establishment of a sovereign municipality in 1848, Hvožďany belonged to the Lnáře estate.

== Demographics ==
Historical population

Year	Pop.	±%
1869	2,161	—
1880	2,346	+8.6%
1890	2,281	−2.8%
1900	2,119	−7.1%
1910	2,002	−5.5%

Year	Pop.	±%
1921	1,884	−5.9%
1930	1,715	−9.0%
1950	1,379	−19.6%
1961	1,263	−8.4%
1970	1,051	−16.8%

Year	Pop.	±%
1980	880	−16.3%
1991	811	−7.8%
2001	808	−0.4%
2011	789	−2.4%
2021	727	−7.9%

Source: Censuses

== Transport ==
There are no railways or major roads passing through the municipality.

== Sights ==
The main landmark of Hvožďany is the Church of Saint Procopius and the Visitation of the Virgin Mary. It was built in the Gothic style in the first half of the 14th century, then it was extended in the Baroque style. Next to the church is a separate bell tower, built in 1687.
