= Myštice =

- Municipality
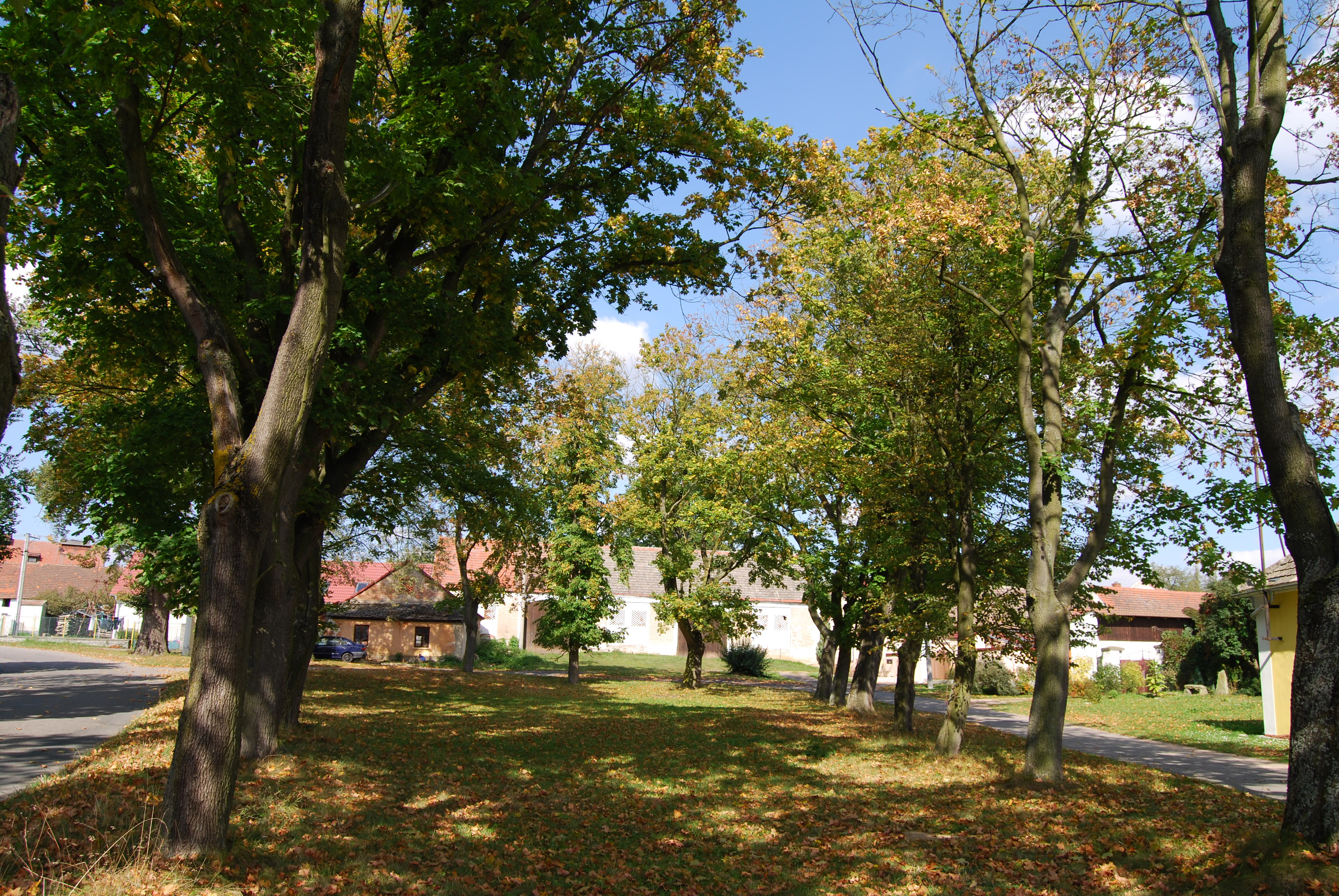
- Centre of Myštice

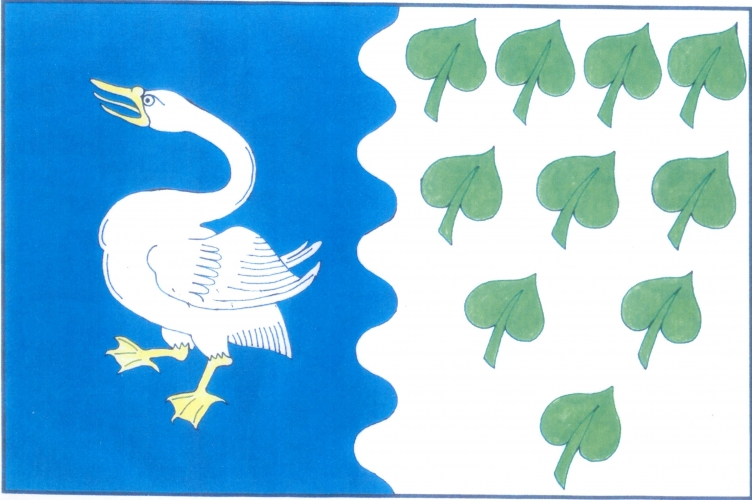
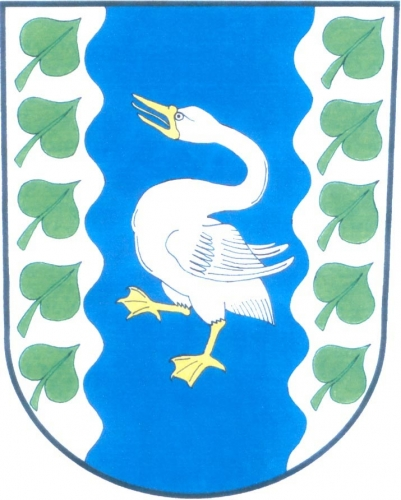
- Flag Coat of arms

- Location in the Czech Republic
- Coordinates: 49°27′12″N 13°58′12″E
- Country: Czech Republic
- Region: South Bohemian
- District: Strakonice
- First mentioned: 1348

Area
  - Total: 15.81 km^{2} (6.10 sq mi)
- Elevation: 459 m (1,506 ft)

Population (2026-01-01)
  - Total: 260
  - Density: 16/km^{2} (43/sq mi)
- Time zone: UTC+1 (CET)
  - Summer (DST): UTC+2 (CEST)
- Postal code: 388 01
- Website: www.obecmystice.cz

Myštice is a municipality and village in Strakonice District in the South Bohemian Region of the Czech Republic. It has about 300 inhabitants.

== Administrative division ==
Myštice consists of seven municipal parts (in brackets population according to the 2021 census):

- Myštice (126)
- Kožlí (14)
- Laciná (34)
- Střížovice (16)
- Svobodka (21)
- Vahlovice (46)
- Výšice (23)

== Etymology ==
The initial name of the village was Myščice. The name was derived from the personal name Myška, meaning "the village of Myška's people".

== Geography ==
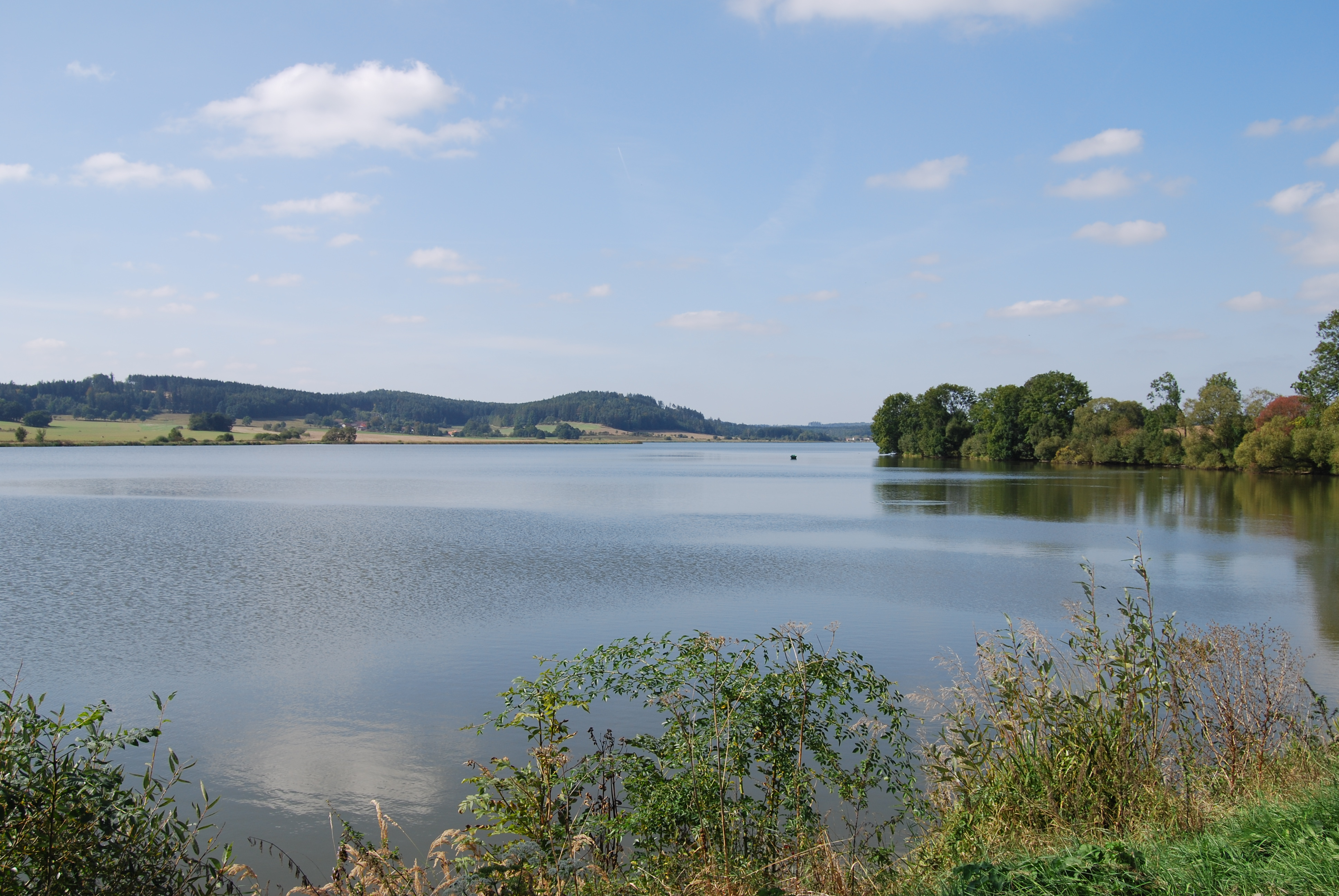
Labuť pond

Myštice is located about 21 kilometres (13 mi) north of Strakonice and 52 km (32 mi) southeast of Plzeň. It lies on the border between the Benešov Uplands and Blatná Uplands. The highest point is at 538 km (334 mi) above sea level. The stream Kostřatský potok and its tributary Ostrovský potok flow through the municipality. The Lomnice River crosses the municipality in the south.

The village of Myštice is situated on the shore of the Labuť fishpond. It has an area of 108.5 ha (268 acres). It was built on the Kostřatský potok in 1492–1503 and it got its name (meaning 'swan') from its elongated shape.

== History ==
The first written mention of Myštice is from 1348, when the village ceased to be part of the Zvíkov estate and was acquired by Huk of Dornštejn. It 1418, his family sold Myštice to Petr Zmrzlík of Svojšín, who annexed it to the Orlík estate. From 1609, Blatná belonged to the Blatná estate.

The oldest village of the municipality is Výšice, which was first mentioned in 1045, when it belonged to the Břevnov Monastery.

== Demographics ==
Historical population

Year	Pop.	±%
1869	1,088	—
1880	1,095	+0.6%
1890	1,029	−6.0%
1900	986	−4.2%
1910	942	−4.5%

Year	Pop.	±%
1921	888	−5.7%
1930	818	−7.9%
1950	582	−28.9%
1961	531	−8.8%
1970	442	−16.8%

Year	Pop.	±%
1980	392	−11.3%
1991	332	−15.3%
2001	282	−15.1%
2011	269	−4.6%
2021	280	+4.1%

Source: Censuses

== Transport ==
There are no railways or major roads passing through the municipality.

== Sights ==
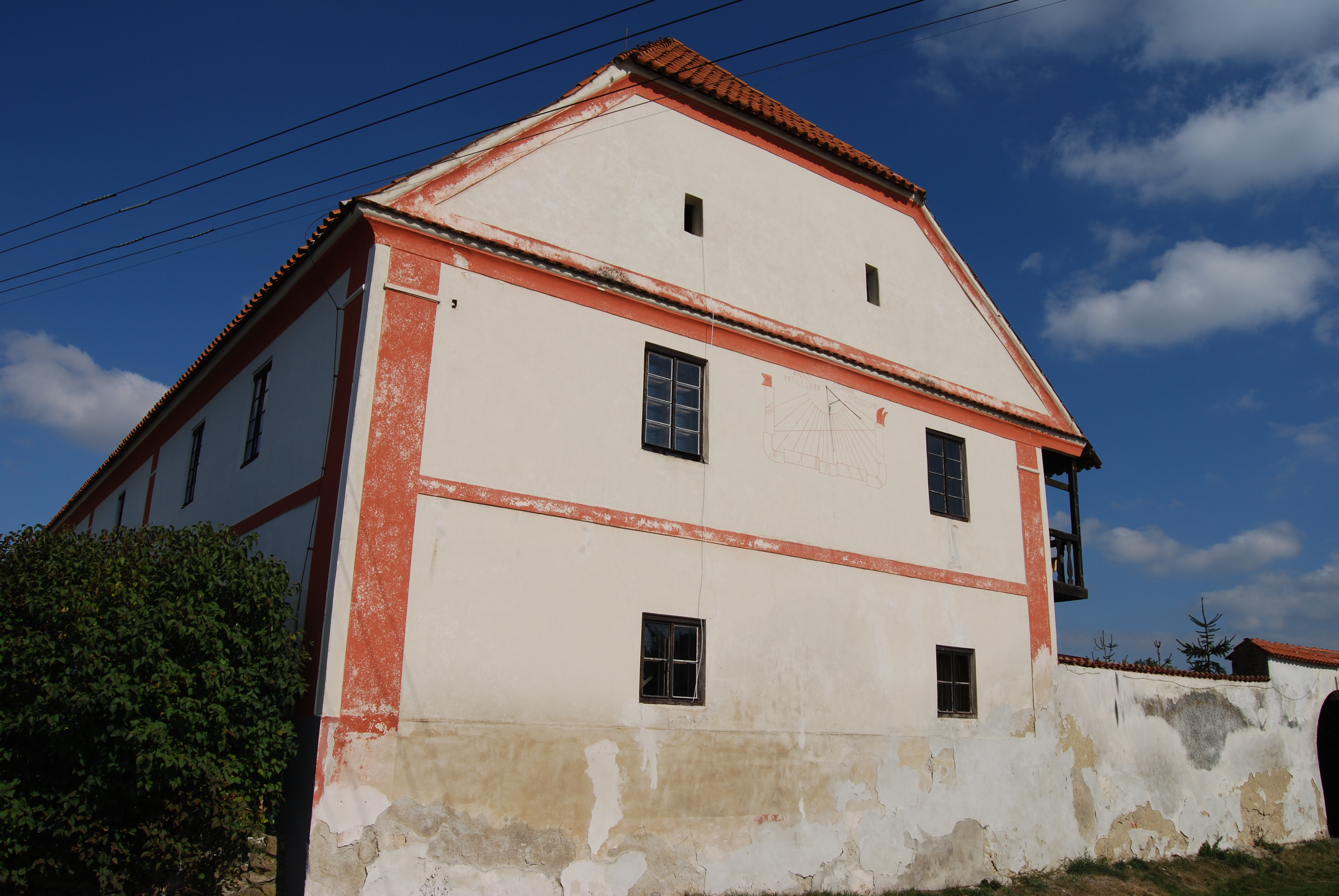
Former inn

A notable building is the former inn of medieval origin. It was rebuilt in the Renaissance and Baroque styles and then in 1971–1975. It has valuable exteriors with Baroque elements.

The so-called sejpy (man-made mounds that are the remains of gold panning) extends 300 m along the banks of the Lomnice River, near Laciná.
