= Zborovy =

- Municipality
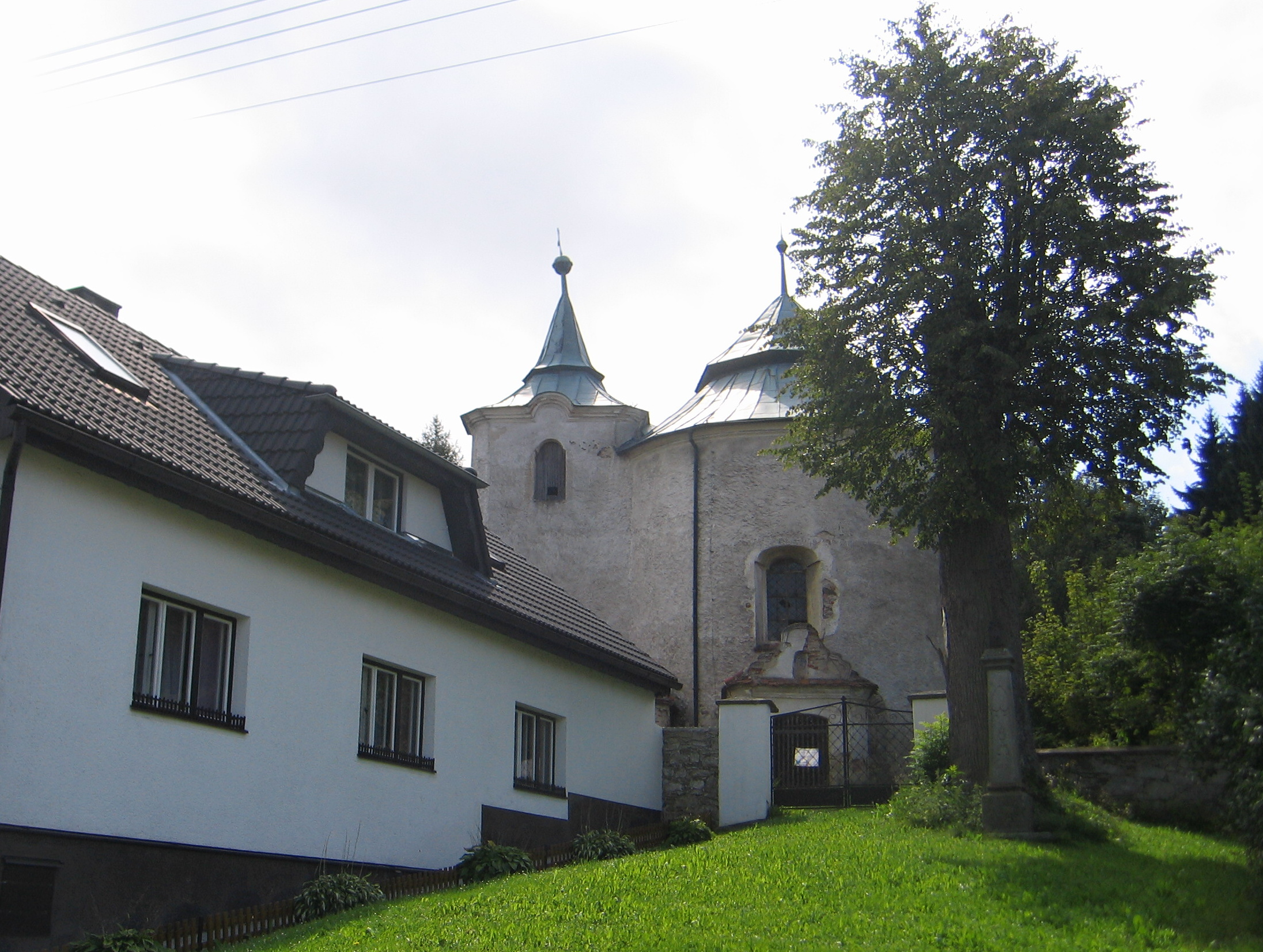
- Church of Saint John the Baptist

- Location in the Czech Republic
- Coordinates: 49°22′52″N 13°30′56″E
- Country: Czech Republic
- Region: Plzeň
- District: Klatovy
- First mentioned: 1418

Area
  - Total: 6.77 km^{2} (2.61 sq mi)
- Elevation: 577 m (1,893 ft)

Population (2026-01-01)
  - Total: 130
  - Density: 19/km^{2} (50/sq mi)
- Time zone: UTC+1 (CET)
  - Summer (DST): UTC+2 (CEST)
- Postal code: 340 34
- Website: www.zborovy.cz

Zborovy is a municipality and village in Klatovy District in the Plzeň Region of the Czech Republic. It has about 100 inhabitants.

== Etymology ==
The name is derived from the personal name Zbor.

== Geography ==
Zborovy is located about 16 kilometres (10 mi) east of Klatovy and 39 km (24 mi) south of Plzeň. It lies in the Blatná Uplands. The highest point is at 640 m (2,100 ft) above sea level. There are several small watercourses and fishponds in the territory.

== History ==
The first written mention of Zborovy is from 1418.

== Demographics ==
Historical population

Year	Pop.	±%
1869	553	—
1880	553	+0.0%
1890	481	−13.0%
1900	424	−11.9%
1910	423	−0.2%

Year	Pop.	±%
1921	412	−2.6%
1930	367	−10.9%
1950	264	−28.1%
1961	256	−3.0%
1970	209	−18.4%

Year	Pop.	±%
1980	173	−17.2%
1991	158	−8.7%
2001	138	−12.7%
2011	130	−5.8%
2021	103	−20.8%

Source: Censuses

== Transport ==
There are no railways or major roads passing through the municipality.

== Sights ==
The most valuable building is the Church of Saint John the Baptist. It was first mentioned in 1384. It was originally a Romanesque rotunda, built at the turn of the 12th and 13th centuries. Baroque modifications were carried out in three stages from the 17th century until 1778.
