= Buzice =

- Municipality
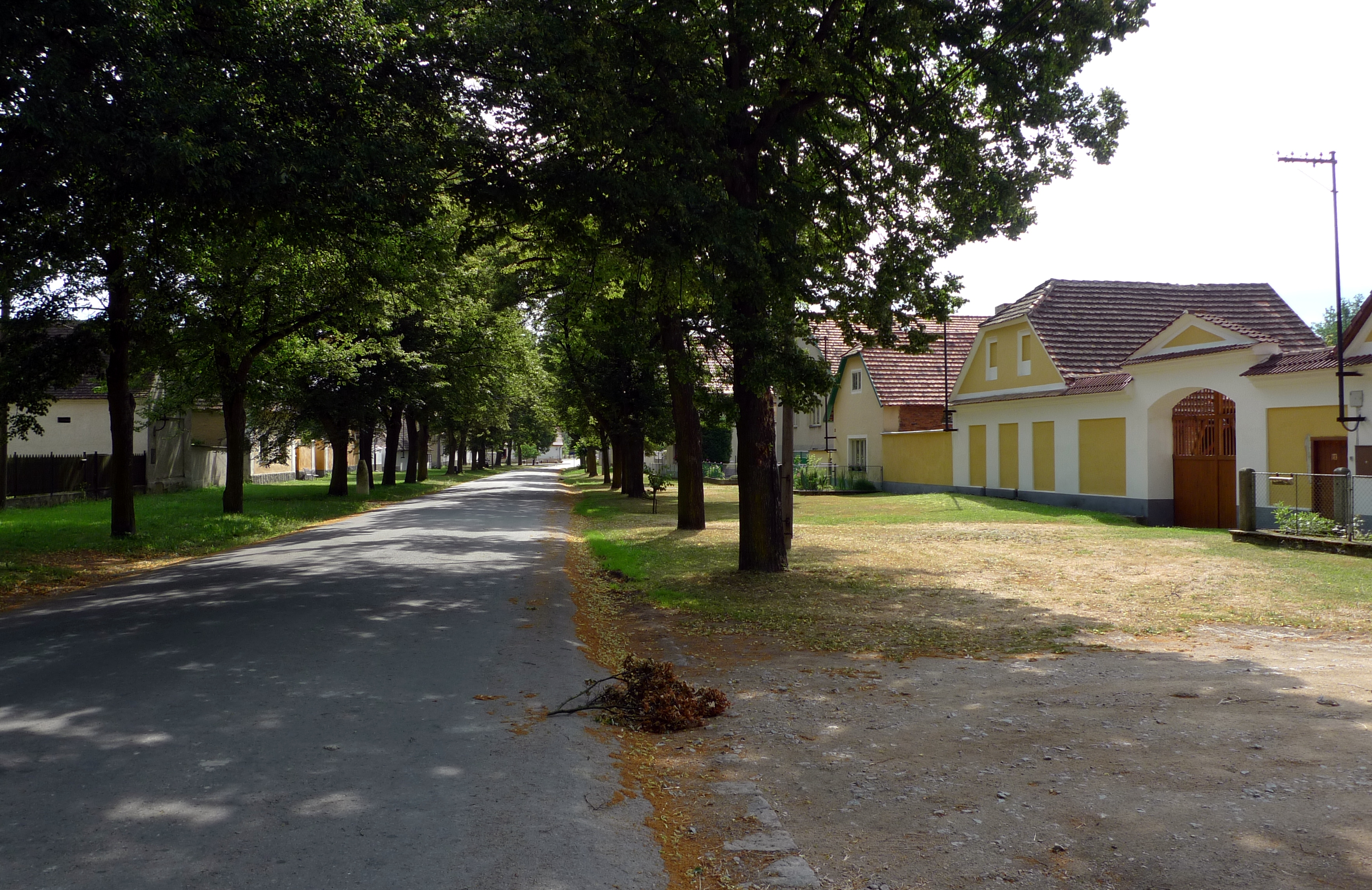
- Main street

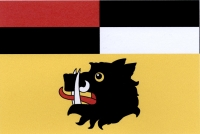
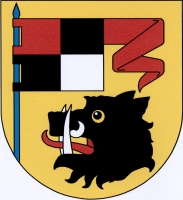
- Flag Coat of arms

- Location in the Czech Republic
- Coordinates: 49°25′22″N 13°55′58″E
- Country: Czech Republic
- Region: South Bohemian
- District: Strakonice
- First mentioned: 1384

Area
  - Total: 8.39 km^{2} (3.24 sq mi)
- Elevation: 432 m (1,417 ft)

Population (2026-01-01)
  - Total: 183
  - Density: 21.8/km^{2} (56.5/sq mi)
- Time zone: UTC+1 (CET)
  - Summer (DST): UTC+2 (CEST)
- Postal code: 388 01
- Website: www.buzice.cz

Buzice is a municipality and village in Strakonice District in the South Bohemian Region of the Czech Republic. It has about 200 inhabitants.

== Administrative division ==
Buzice consists of two municipal parts (in brackets population according to the 2021 census):

- Buzice (159)
- Václavov (7)

== Etymology ==
The name is derived from the personal name Búz, meaning "the village of Búz's people".

== Geography ==
Buzice is located about 18 kilometres (11 mi) north of Strakonice and 51 km (32 mi) southeast of Plzeň. The western part of the municipality with the Buzice village lies in the Blatná Uplands; the eastern part with Václavov lies in the Benešov Uplands. The highest point is the hill Zbuzy at 512 m (1,680 ft) above sea level. The Lomnice River flows through the municipality. The municipal territory is rich in fishponds.

== History ==
The first written mention of Buzice is from 1384, when Předota of Buzice was documented. The next mention is from 1558, when Buzice was described as a village with a fortress, a mill and inns.

== Demographics ==
Historical population

Year	Pop.	±%
1869	573	—
1880	565	−1.4%
1890	498	−11.9%
1900	490	−1.6%
1910	509	+3.9%

Year	Pop.	±%
1921	523	+2.8%
1930	426	−18.5%
1950	285	−33.1%
1961	252	−11.6%
1970	225	−10.7%

Year	Pop.	±%
1980	190	−15.6%
1991	166	−12.6%
2001	136	−18.1%
2011	158	+16.2%
2021	166	+5.1%

Source: Censuses

== Transport ==
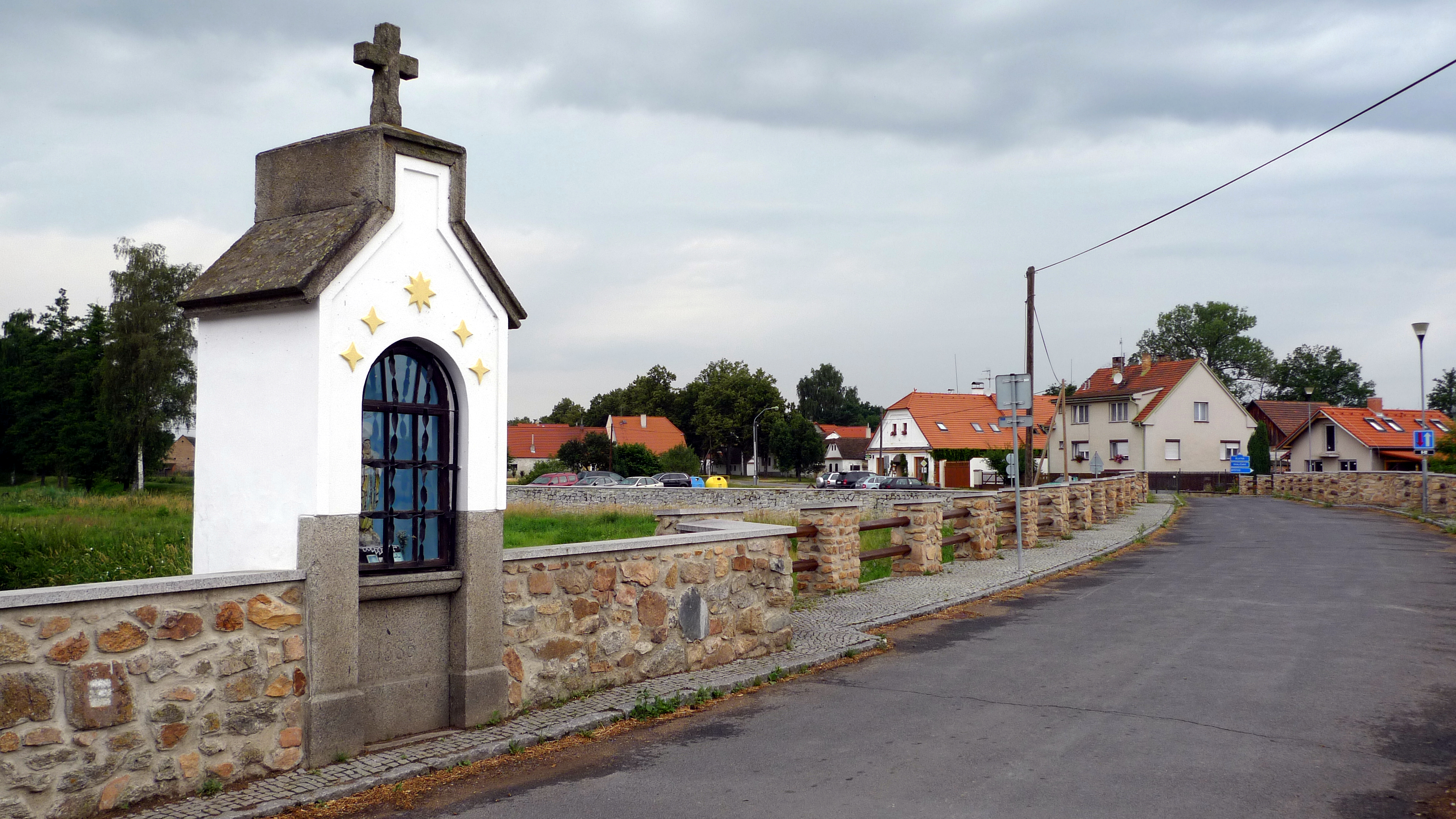
Eastern part of Buzice

There are no railways or major roads passing through the municipality.

== Sights ==
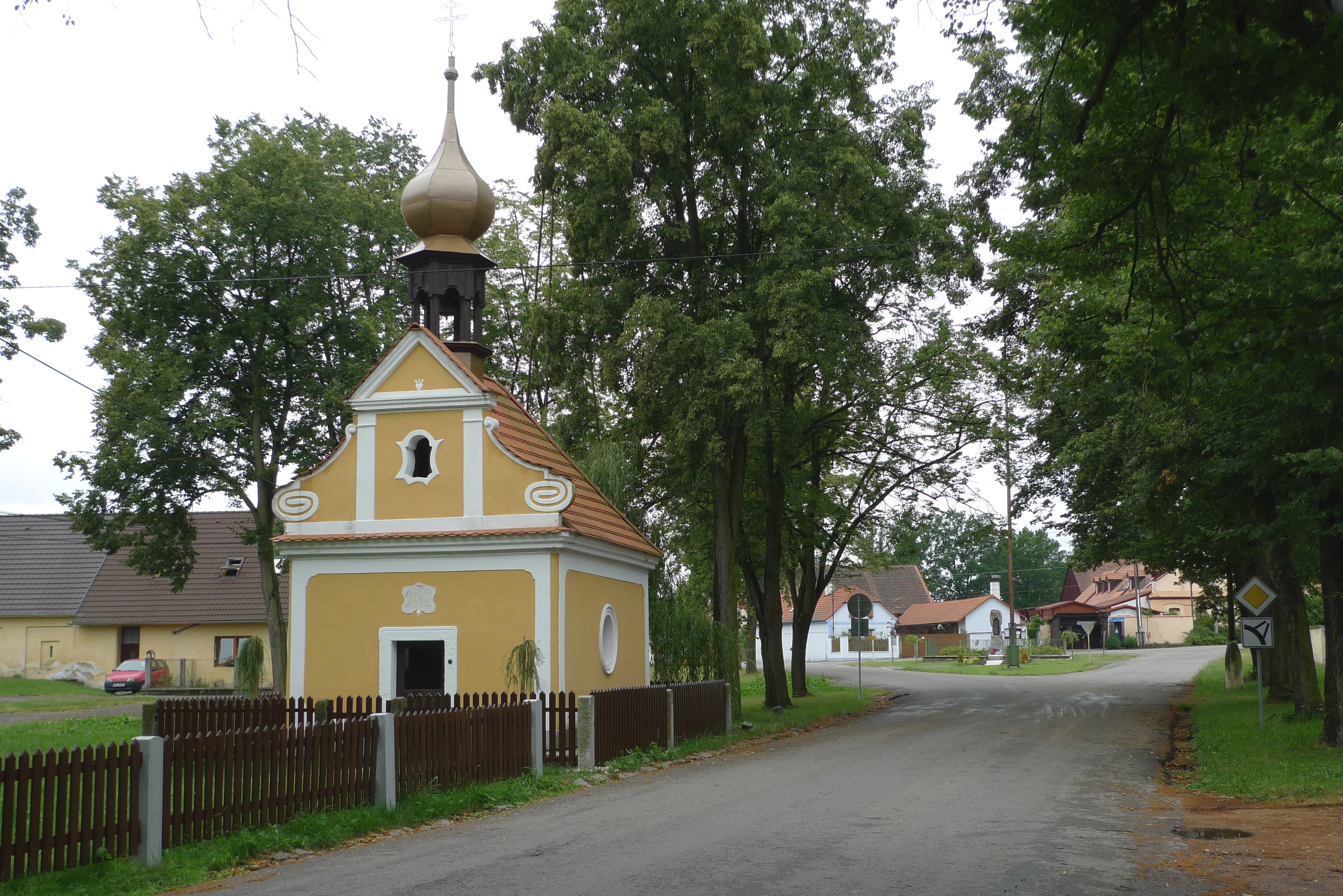
Chapel of Saint Wenceslaus

Buzice Fortress, also called Buzice Castle for its size and massive tower, was founded in the second half of the 14th century. In the mid-16th century, it was abandoned. In the 16th and 17th centuries, its two wings were converted into baroque granaries. Most of the main building with part of the residential wings and the remains of the corner tower have survived from the fortress. The remains of the moat and ramparts are well preserved in the southeastern part.

The Chapel of Saint Wenceslaus in the centre of Buzice was built in the early Baroque style in 1810.
