= Lnáře =

- Municipality
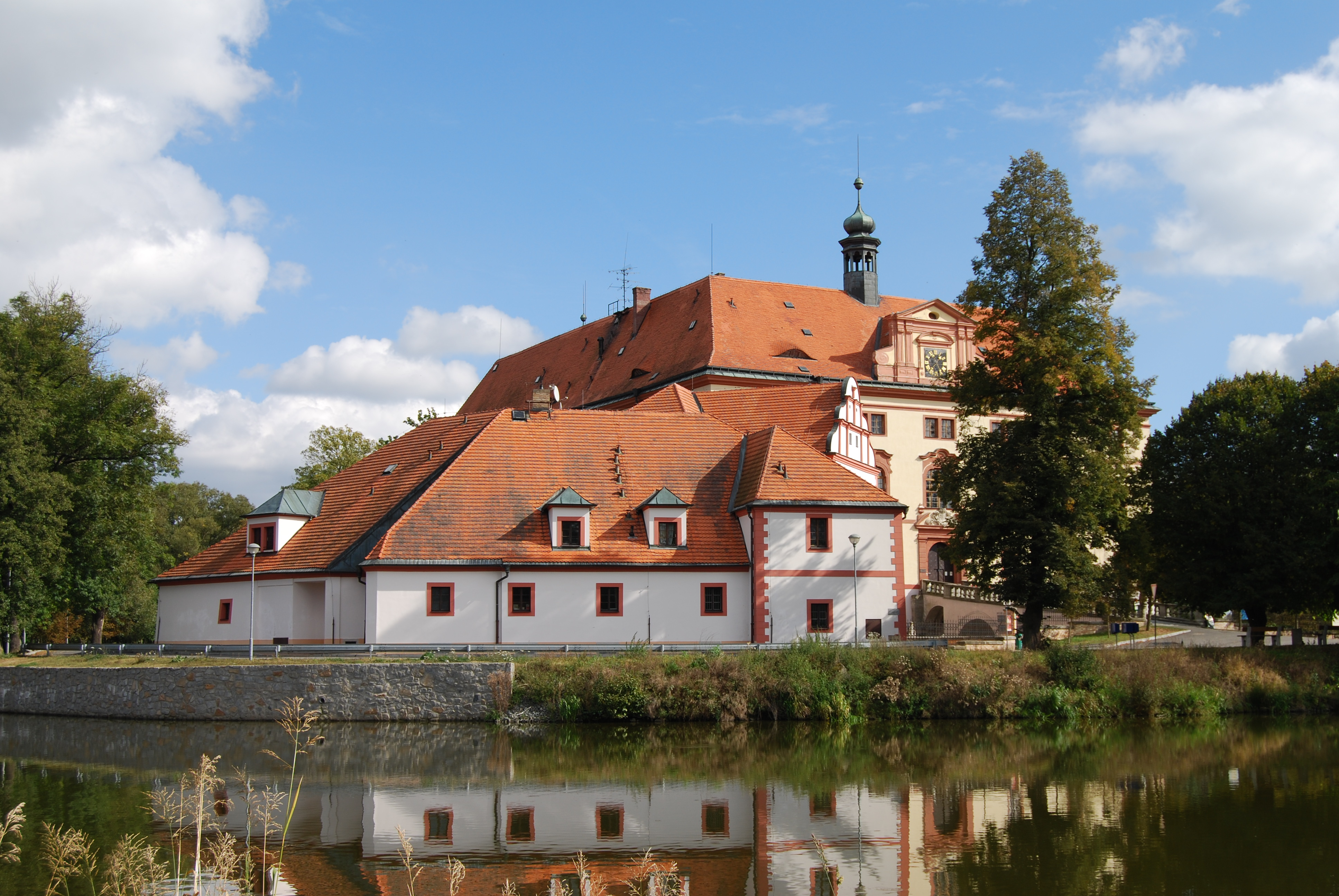
- Lnáře Fortress and Lnáře Castle (in the background) on the shore of Zámecký rybník

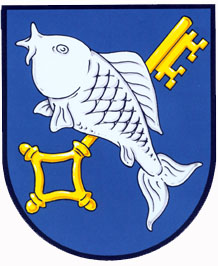
- Flag Coat of arms

- Location in the Czech Republic
- Coordinates: 49°27′29″N 13°47′3″E
- Country: Czech Republic
- Region: South Bohemian
- District: Strakonice
- First mentioned: 1318

Area
  - Total: 12.69 km^{2} (4.90 sq mi)
- Elevation: 565 m (1,854 ft)

Population (2026-01-01)
  - Total: 730
  - Density: 58/km^{2} (150/sq mi)
- Time zone: UTC+1 (CET)
  - Summer (DST): UTC+2 (CEST)
- Postal code: 387 42
- Website: www.lnare-obec.cz

Lnáře (German: Schlüsselburg) is a municipality and village in Strakonice District in the South Bohemian Region of the Czech Republic. It has about 700 inhabitants.

== Administrative division ==
Lnáře consists of two municipal parts (in brackets population according to the 2021 census):

- Lnáře (573)
- Zahorčice (80)

== Etymology ==
The name Lnáře is derived from the Czech word lnář (denoting a person who cultivate, process or sale flax). The German name is derived from Schlüssel (meaning 'key') and Burg ('castle'). It refers to a key worn in coat of arms of the noble family of Schlüsselberg who probably founded the local aristocratic residence.

== Geography ==
Lnáře is located about 23 kilometres (14 mi) north of Strakonice and 40 km (25 mi) southeast of Plzeň, in the historical region of Prácheňsko. It lies in the Blatná Uplands. The highest point is the hill Jezbyně at 577 m (1,893 ft) above sea level.

The built-up area is situated on the shores of three fishponds, connected by the Lomnice River (here also called Smolivecký potok): Veský rybník, Zámecký rybník and Podhájský rybník. The fourth large pond, located in the southern part of the municipal territory, is Nový rybník.

== History ==
The first written mention of Lnáře is from 1318, when it is written about the then owner of the village Habart of Lnáře. The village of Zahorčice is first mentioned in 1383. In the 14th century, the tradition of pond farming began. Pond farming and forestry became the main source of lordship income for next centuries. The first mention of the fortress and the pond below it is from 1465.

In 1899, the railway was built. The construction of the I/20 road in 1931 and 1953–1954 through Lnáře further improved the transport accessibility of the municipality.

== Demographics ==
Historical population

Year	Pop.	±%
1869	1,207	—
1880	1,298	+7.5%
1890	1,326	+2.2%
1900	1,235	−6.9%
1910	1,267	+2.6%

Year	Pop.	±%
1921	1,246	−1.7%
1930	1,163	−6.7%
1950	960	−17.5%
1961	1,103	+14.9%
1970	943	−14.5%

Year	Pop.	±%
1980	878	−6.9%
1991	770	−12.3%
2001	793	+3.0%
2011	721	−9.1%
2021	653	−9.4%

Source: Censuses

== Transport ==
The I/20 road (part of the European route E49) from Plzeň to Písek passes through the municipality.

Lnáře is located on the railway line Blatná–Nepomuk.

== Sights ==
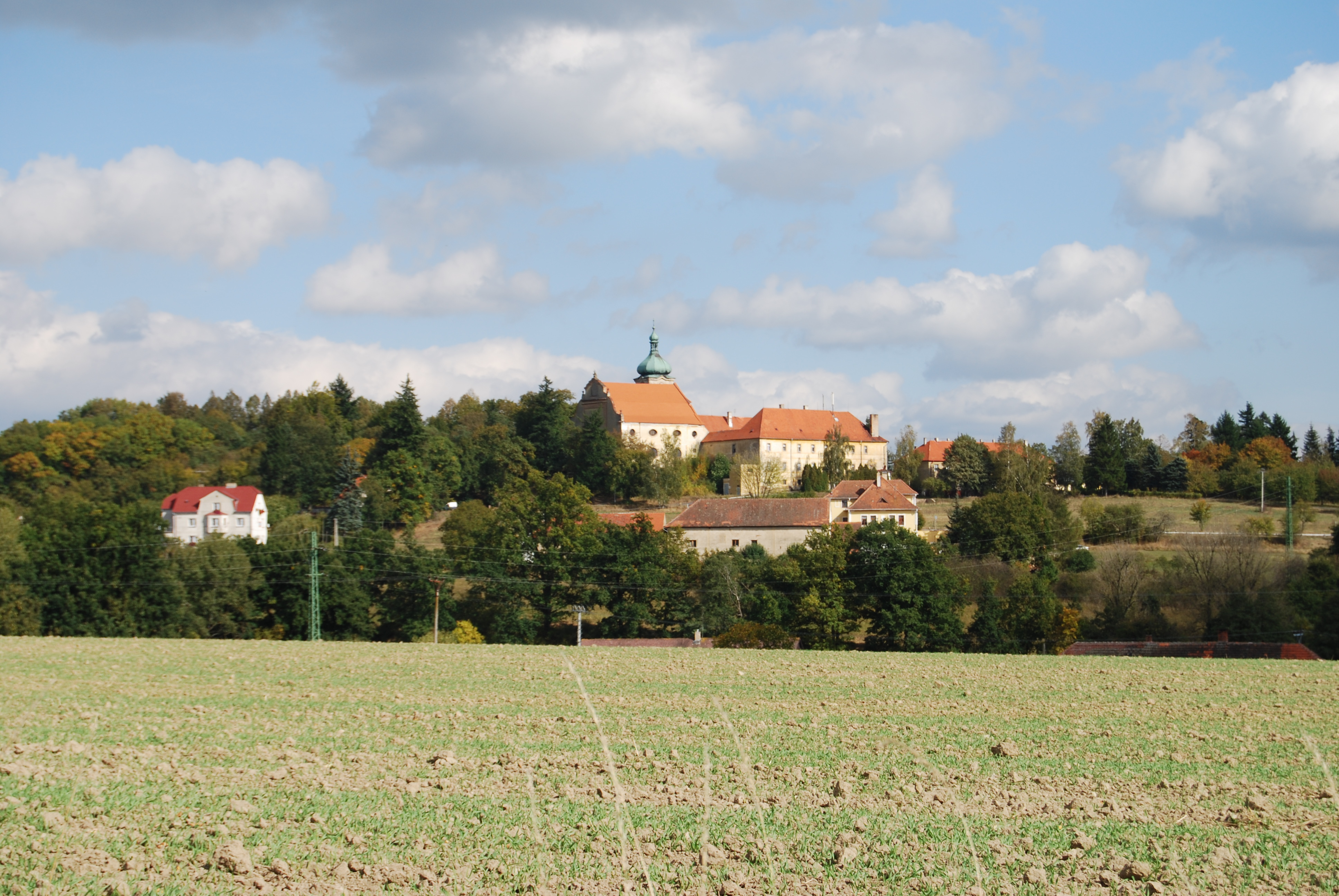
Discalced Augustinians Monastery

Lnáře has two castles: the Lnáře Fortress (also called Old Fortress) and the Lnáře Castle (also called New Castle). The Old Fortress was built before 1318 and rebuilt in the Renaissance style around 1597. After it ceased to satisfy the comforts of a manor's residence, the neighbouring castle was built. Today the Old Fortress houses the tourist infocentre and an art gallery.

The Lnáře Castle is a Baroque building, surrounded by a 4-hectare (10-acre) large English park. The representative rooms of the castle are richly decorated with wall and ceiling frescoes with scenes from ancient mythology. The Great Hall, which is one of the largest Baroque halls in Central Europe, is used for social events. The castle offers sightseeing tours and also serves as a hotel and restaurant.

Other sights include the monastery of the Discalced Augustinians founded in 1684 by the Church of the Holy Trinity. The church itself was built in 1599 and extended in the early Baroque style in 1666. Since 1965, the building of the monastery is used as a psychiatric hospital.

Other ecclesiastical buildings in Lnáře include the Church of Saint Nicholas with a cemetery, Chapel of Saint Anne, and a chapel in Zahořice.

== Notable people ==
- Karolina Slunéčková (1934–1983), actress; lived here and is buried here
