= Ostrovec =

- Municipality
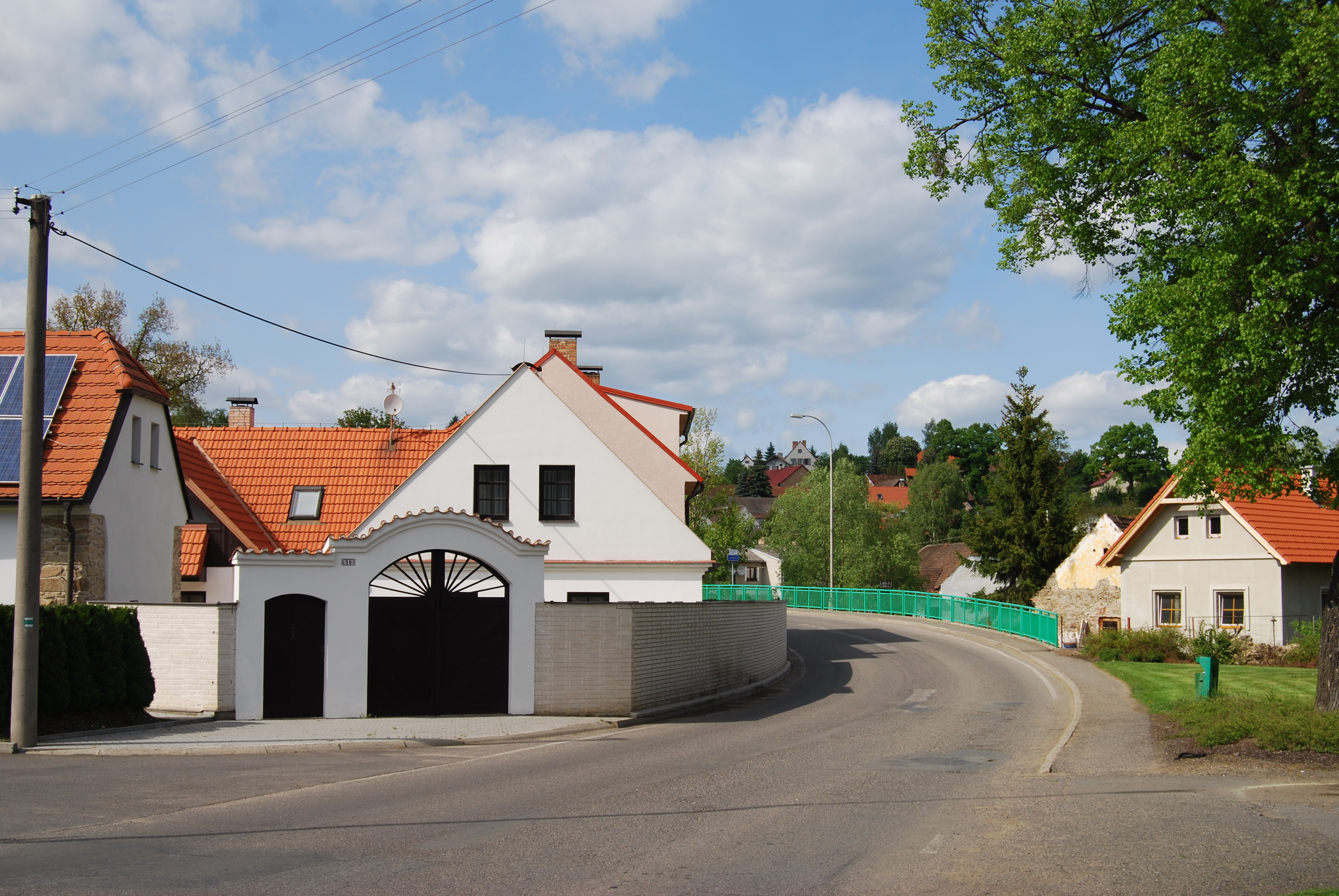
- Dolní Ostrovec, a part of Ostrovec

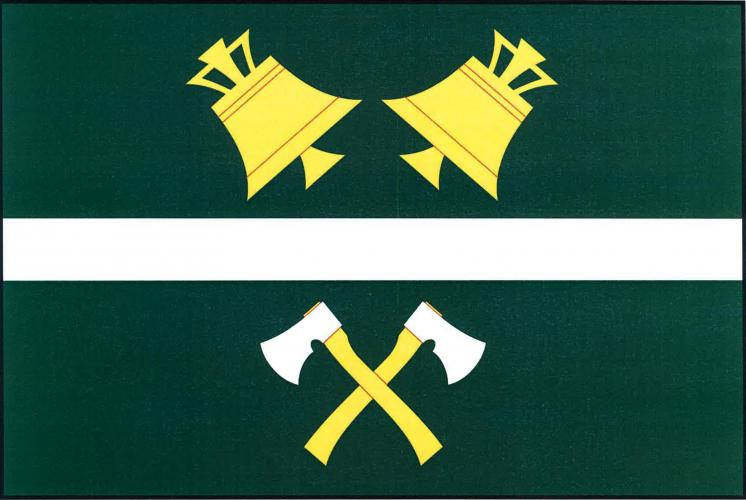
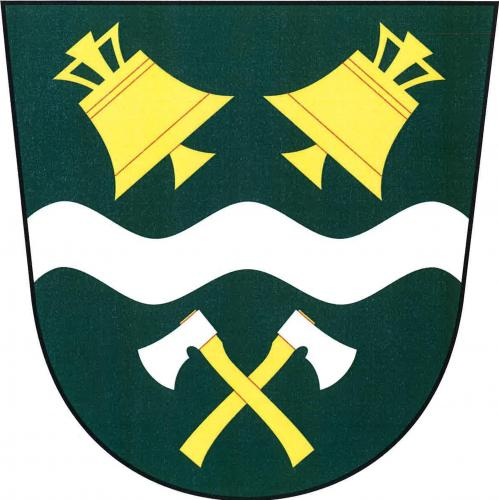
- Flag Coat of arms

- Location in the Czech Republic
- Coordinates: 49°25′15″N 14°7′2″E
- Country: Czech Republic
- Region: South Bohemian
- District: Písek
- First mentioned: 1323

Area
  - Total: 20.57 km^{2} (7.94 sq mi)
- Elevation: 383 m (1,257 ft)

Population (2026-01-01)
  - Total: 378
  - Density: 18.4/km^{2} (47.6/sq mi)
- Time zone: UTC+1 (CET)
  - Summer (DST): UTC+2 (CEST)
- Postal code: 398 33
- Website: www.ostrovec-obec.cz

Ostrovec is a municipality in Písek District in the South Bohemian Region of the Czech Republic. It has about 400 inhabitants.

Ostrovec lies approximately 14 kilometres (9 mi) north of Písek, 56 km (35 mi) north-west of České Budějovice, and 78 km (48 mi) south of Prague.

== Administrative division ==
Ostrovec consists of three municipal parts (in brackets population according to the 2021 census):

- Dolní Ostrovec (225)
- Horní Ostrovec (102)
- Dědovice (16)

== Demographics ==
Historical population
Year	Pop.	±%
1869	922	—
1880	956	+3.7%
1890	943	−1.4%
1900	818	−13.3%
1910	762	−6.8%
1921	807	+5.9%
1930	732	−9.3%
1950	522	−28.7%
1961	568	+8.8%
1970	516	−9.2%
1980	473	−8.3%
1991	396	−16.3%
2001	363	−8.3%
2011	372	+2.5%
2021	343	−7.8%
Source: Censuses
