= Hvožďany (Domažlice District) =

- Municipality
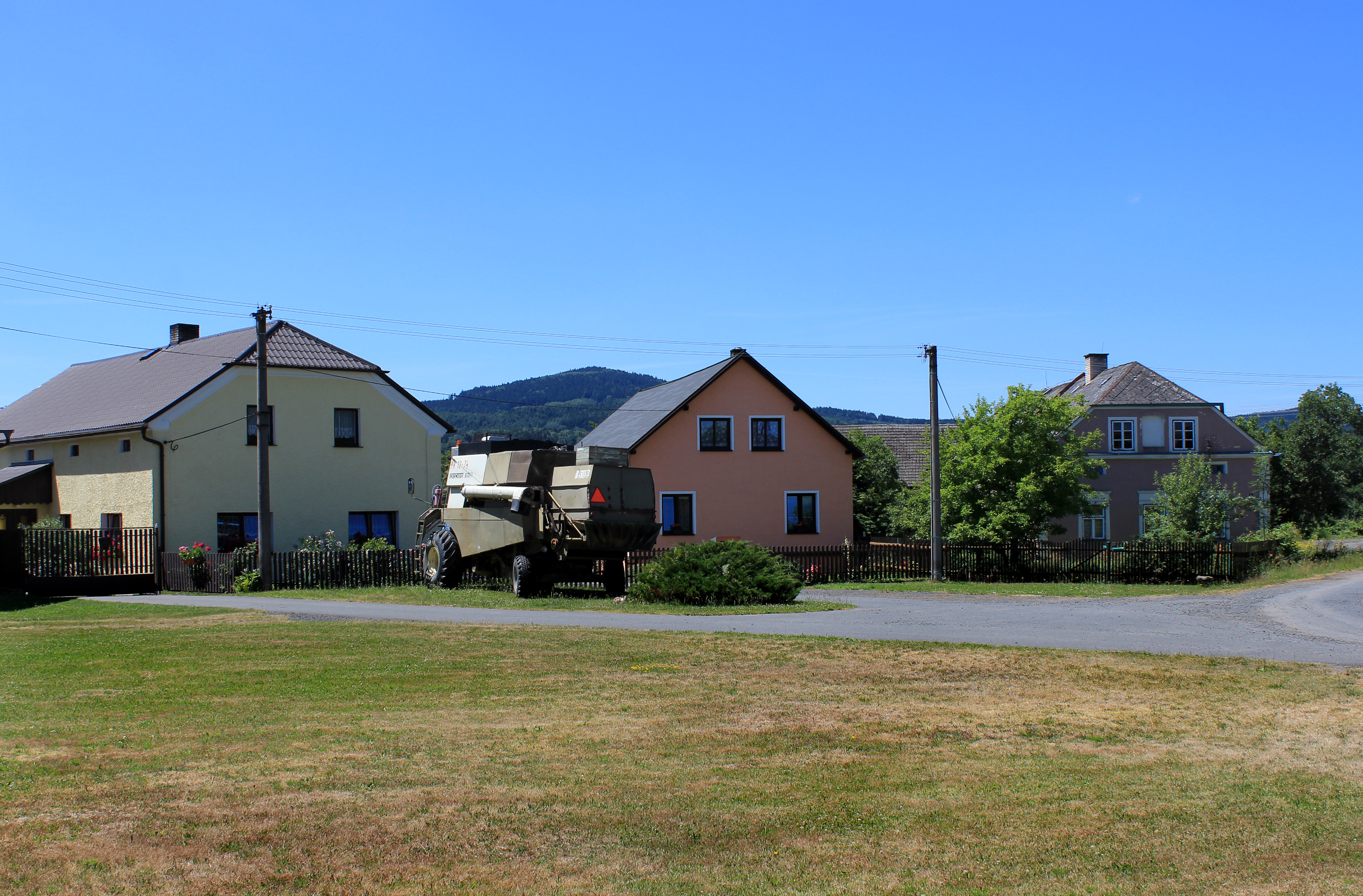
- Centre of Hvožďany

- Location in the Czech Republic
- Coordinates: 49°30′20″N 12°46′17″E
- Country: Czech Republic
- Region: Plzeň
- District: Domažlice
- First mentioned: 1239

Area
  - Total: 3.00 km^{2} (1.16 sq mi)
- Elevation: 507 m (1,663 ft)

Population (2026-01-01)
  - Total: 37
  - Density: 12/km^{2} (32/sq mi)
- Time zone: UTC+1 (CET)
  - Summer (DST): UTC+2 (CEST)
- Postal code: 345 22
- Website: www.hvozdany.info

Hvožďany is a municipality and village in Domažlice District in the Plzeň Region of the Czech Republic. It has about 40 inhabitants.

Hvožďany lies approximately 14 kilometres (9 mi) north-west of Domažlice, 52 km (32 mi) south-west of Plzeň, and 136 km (85 mi) south-west of Prague.

== Demographics ==
Historical population
| Year | Pop. | ±% |
|---|---|---|
| 1869 | 208 | — |
| 1880 | 158 | −24.0% |
| 1890 | 163 | +3.2% |
| 1900 | 144 | −11.7% |
| 1910 | 145 | +0.7% |
| 1921 | 154 | +6.2% |
| 1930 | 145 | −5.8% |
| 1950 | 62 | −57.2% |
| 1961 | 54 | −12.9% |
| 1970 | 49 | −9.3% |
| 1980 | 42 | −14.3% |
| 1991 | 36 | −14.3% |
| 2001 | 34 | −5.6% |
| 2011 | 32 | −5.9% |
| 2021 | 31 | −3.1% |
Source: Censuses
