= Mladý Smolivec =

- Municipality
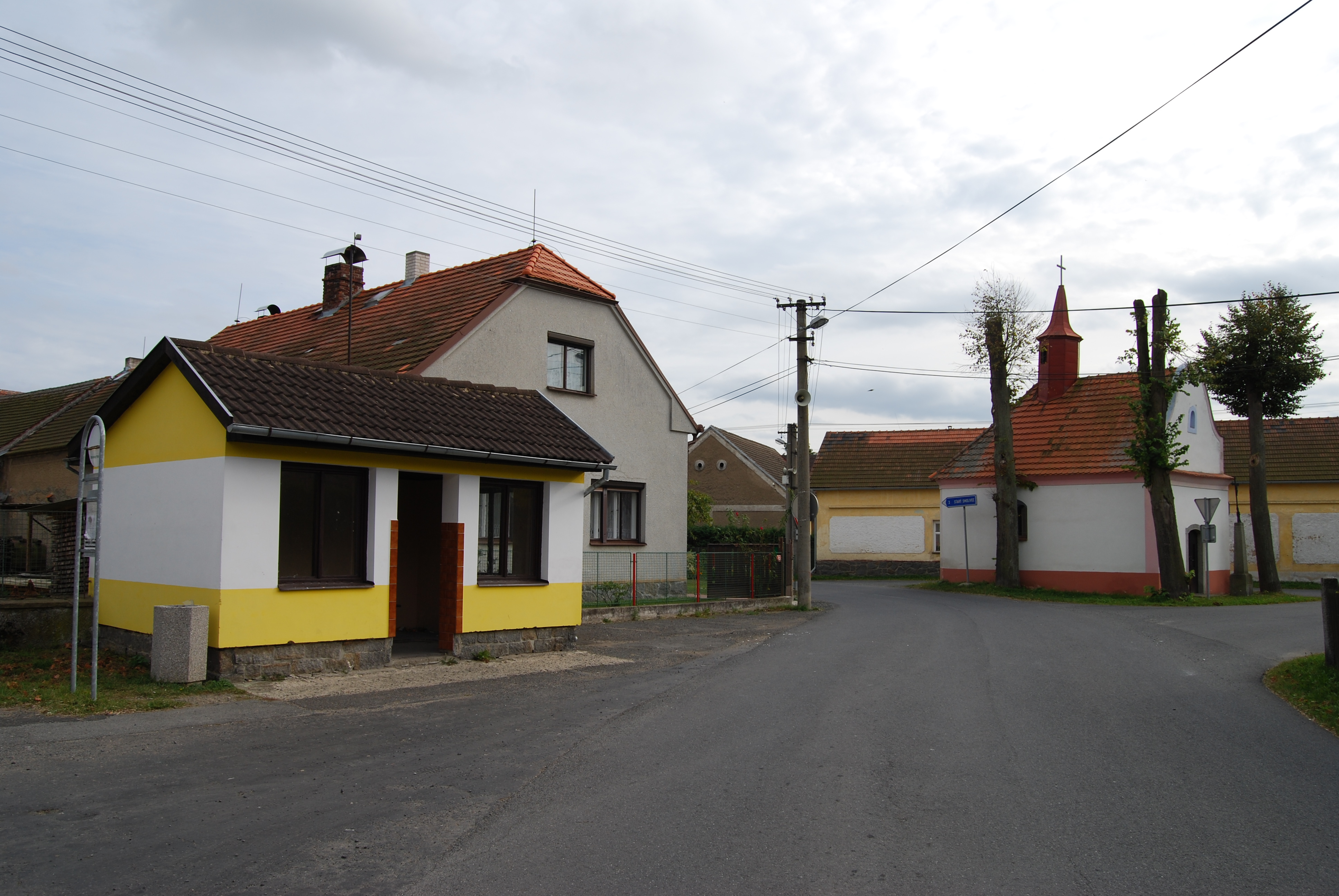
- Centre of Mladý Smolivec

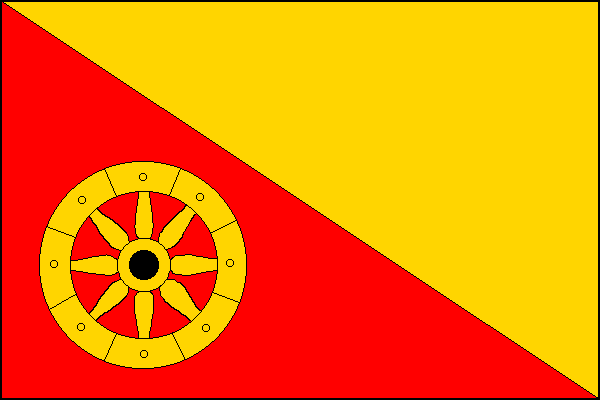
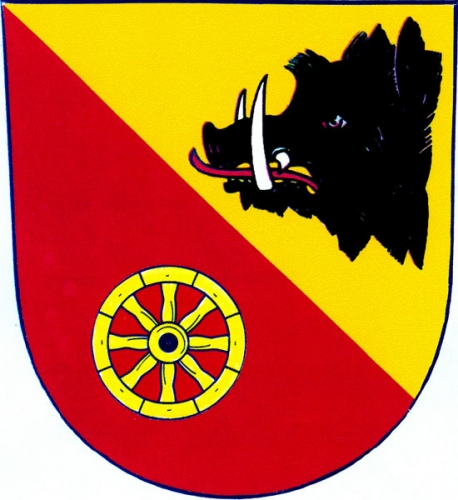
- Flag Coat of arms

- Location in the Czech Republic
- Coordinates: 49°30′23″N 13°44′7″E
- Country: Czech Republic
- Region: Plzeň
- District: Plzeň-South
- First mentioned: 1414

Area
  - Total: 30.40 km^{2} (11.74 sq mi)
- Elevation: 514 m (1,686 ft)

Population (2026-01-01)
  - Total: 666
  - Density: 21.9/km^{2} (56.7/sq mi)
- Time zone: UTC+1 (CET)
  - Summer (DST): UTC+2 (CEST)
- Postal codes: 335 01, 335 43
- Website: www.mladysmolivec.cz

Mladý Smolivec is a municipality and village in Plzeň-South District in the Plzeň Region of the Czech Republic. It has about 700 inhabitants.

Mladý Smolivec lies approximately 38 kilometres (24 mi) south-east of Plzeň and 81 km (50 mi) south-west of Prague.

== Administrative division ==
Mladý Smolivec consists of five municipal parts (in brackets population according to the 2021 census):

- Mladý Smolivec (195)
- Budislavice (67)
- Dožice (119)
- Radošice (113)
- Starý Smolivec (181)

== Demographics ==
Historical population
Year	Pop.	±%
1869	2,416	—
1880	2,357	−2.4%
1890	2,338	−0.8%
1900	2,139	−8.5%
1910	2,034	−4.9%
1921	2,034	+0.0%
1930	1,810	−11.0%
1950	1,241	−31.4%
1961	1,254	+1.0%
1970	1,120	−10.7%
1980	958	−14.5%
1991	848	−11.5%
2001	760	−10.4%
2011	694	−8.7%
2021	675	−2.7%
Source: Censuses
