= Lom (Strakonice District) =

- Municipality
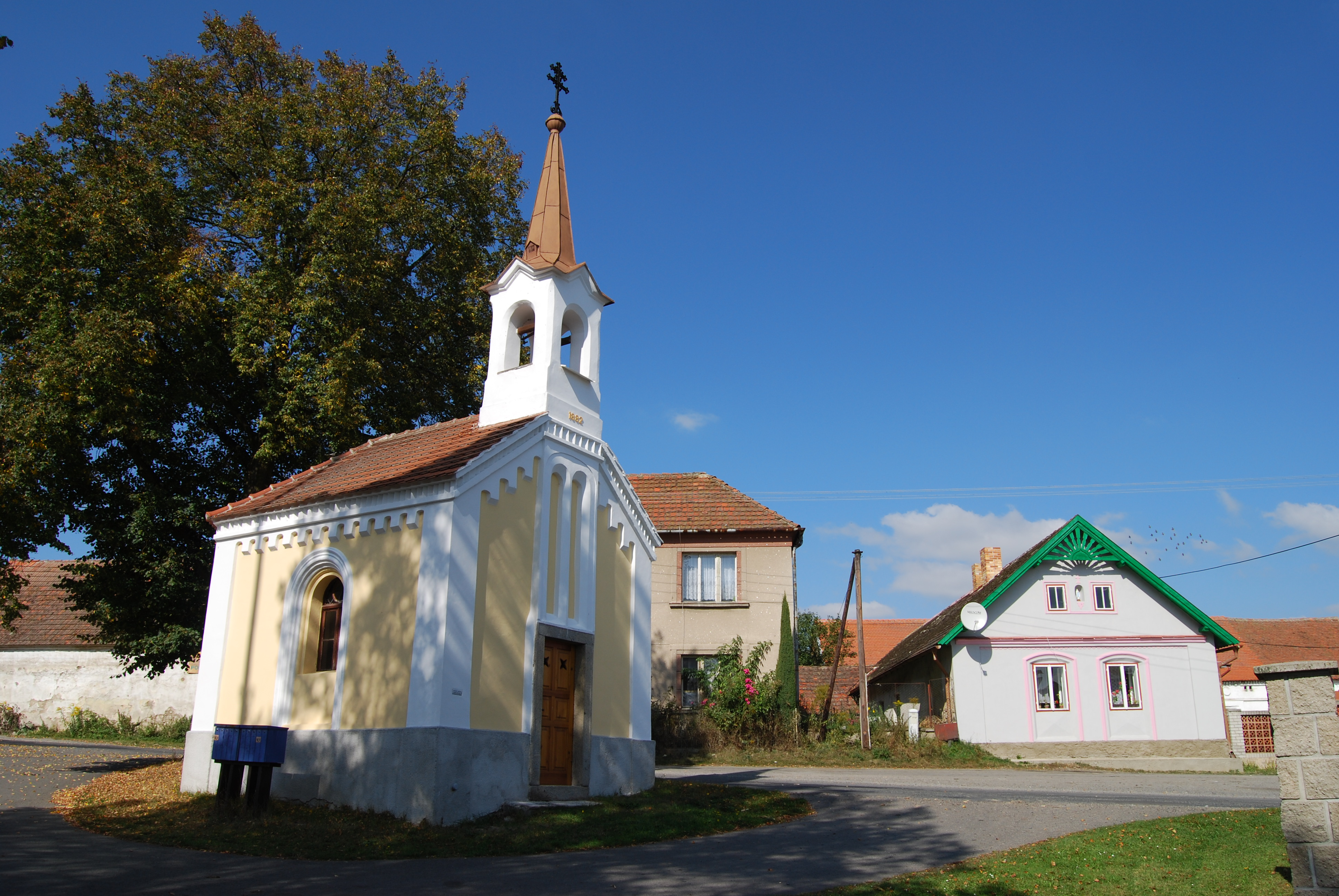
- Chapel

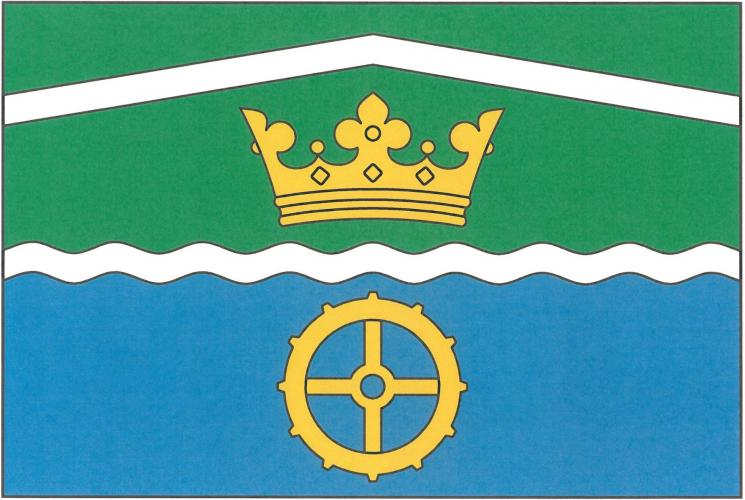
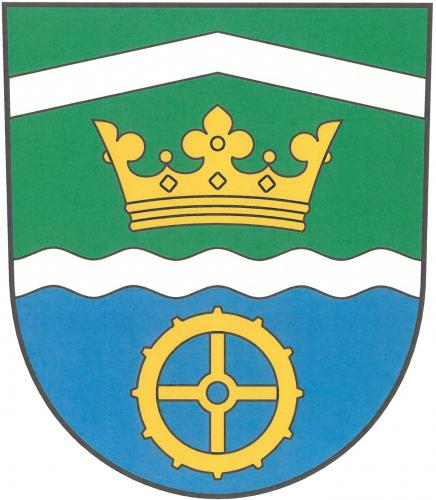
- Flag Coat of arms

- Location in the Czech Republic
- Coordinates: 49°24′38″N 13°59′20″E
- Country: Czech Republic
- Region: South Bohemian
- District: Strakonice
- First mentioned: 1299

Area
  - Total: 5.70 km^{2} (2.20 sq mi)
- Elevation: 474 m (1,555 ft)

Population (2026-01-01)
  - Total: 121
  - Density: 21.2/km^{2} (55.0/sq mi)
- Time zone: UTC+1 (CET)
  - Summer (DST): UTC+2 (CEST)
- Postal code: 388 01
- Website: www.obeclom.eud.cz

Lom is a municipality and village in Strakonice District in the South Bohemian Region of the Czech Republic. It has about 100 inhabitants.

Lom lies approximately 18 kilometres (11 mi) north of Strakonice, 61 km (38 mi) north-west of České Budějovice, and 82 km (51 mi) south-west of Prague.

== Administrative division ==
Lom consists of two municipal parts (in brackets population according to the 2021 census):

- Lom (70)
- Míreč (16)

== Demographics ==
Historical population
Year	Pop.	±%
1869	365	—
1880	376	+3.0%
1890	356	−5.3%
1900	321	−9.8%
1910	348	+8.4%
1921	360	+3.4%
1930	329	−8.6%
1950	240	−27.1%
1961	229	−4.6%
1970	196	−14.4%
1980	180	−8.2%
1991	135	−25.0%
2001	124	−8.1%
2011	100	−19.4%
2021	86	−14.0%
Source: Censuses
