= Tchořovice =

- Municipality
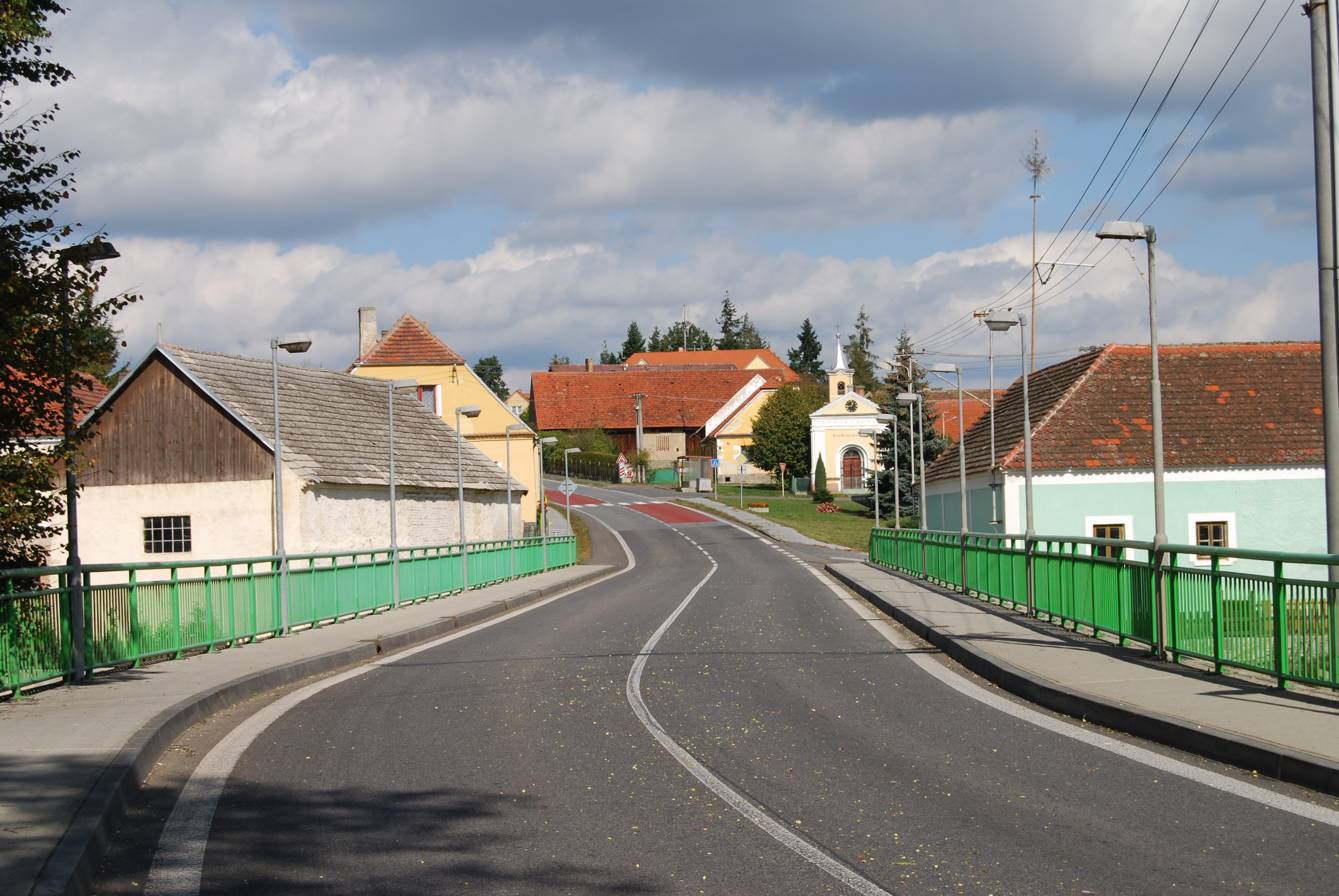
- Centre of Tchořovice

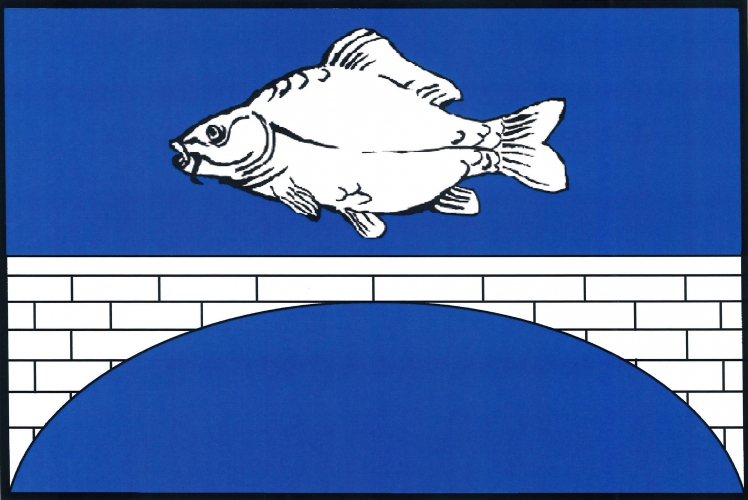
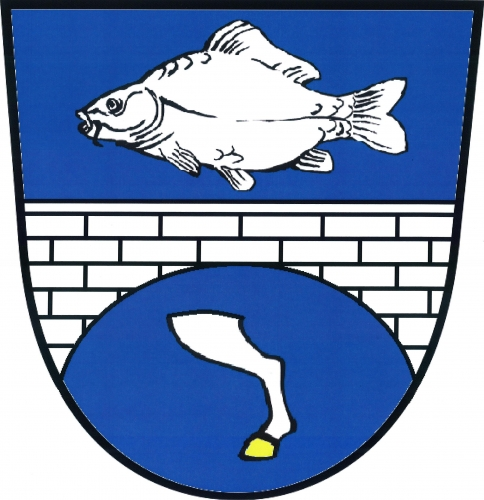
- Flag Coat of arms

- Location in the Czech Republic
- Coordinates: 49°26′14″N 13°48′36″E
- Country: Czech Republic
- Region: South Bohemian
- District: Strakonice
- First mentioned: 1321

Area
  - Total: 10.24 km^{2} (3.95 sq mi)
- Elevation: 454 m (1,490 ft)

Population (2026-01-01)
  - Total: 236
  - Density: 23.0/km^{2} (59.7/sq mi)
- Time zone: UTC+1 (CET)
  - Summer (DST): UTC+2 (CEST)
- Postal code: 388 01
- Website: www.tchorovice.cz

Tchořovice is a municipality and village in Strakonice District in the South Bohemian Region of the Czech Republic. It has about 200 inhabitants.

Tchořovice lies approximately 20 kilometres (12 mi) north of Strakonice, 70 km (43 mi) north-west of České Budějovice, and 85 km (53 mi) south-west of Prague.

== Demographics ==
Historical population
Year	Pop.	±%
1869	476	—
1880	484	+1.7%
1890	478	−1.2%
1900	509	+6.5%
1910	493	−3.1%
1921	478	−3.0%
1930	409	−14.4%
1950	364	−11.0%
1961	356	−2.2%
1970	288	−19.1%
1980	255	−11.5%
1991	244	−4.3%
2001	228	−6.6%
2011	237	+3.9%
2021	242	+2.1%
Source: Censuses
