= Předmíř =

- Municipality
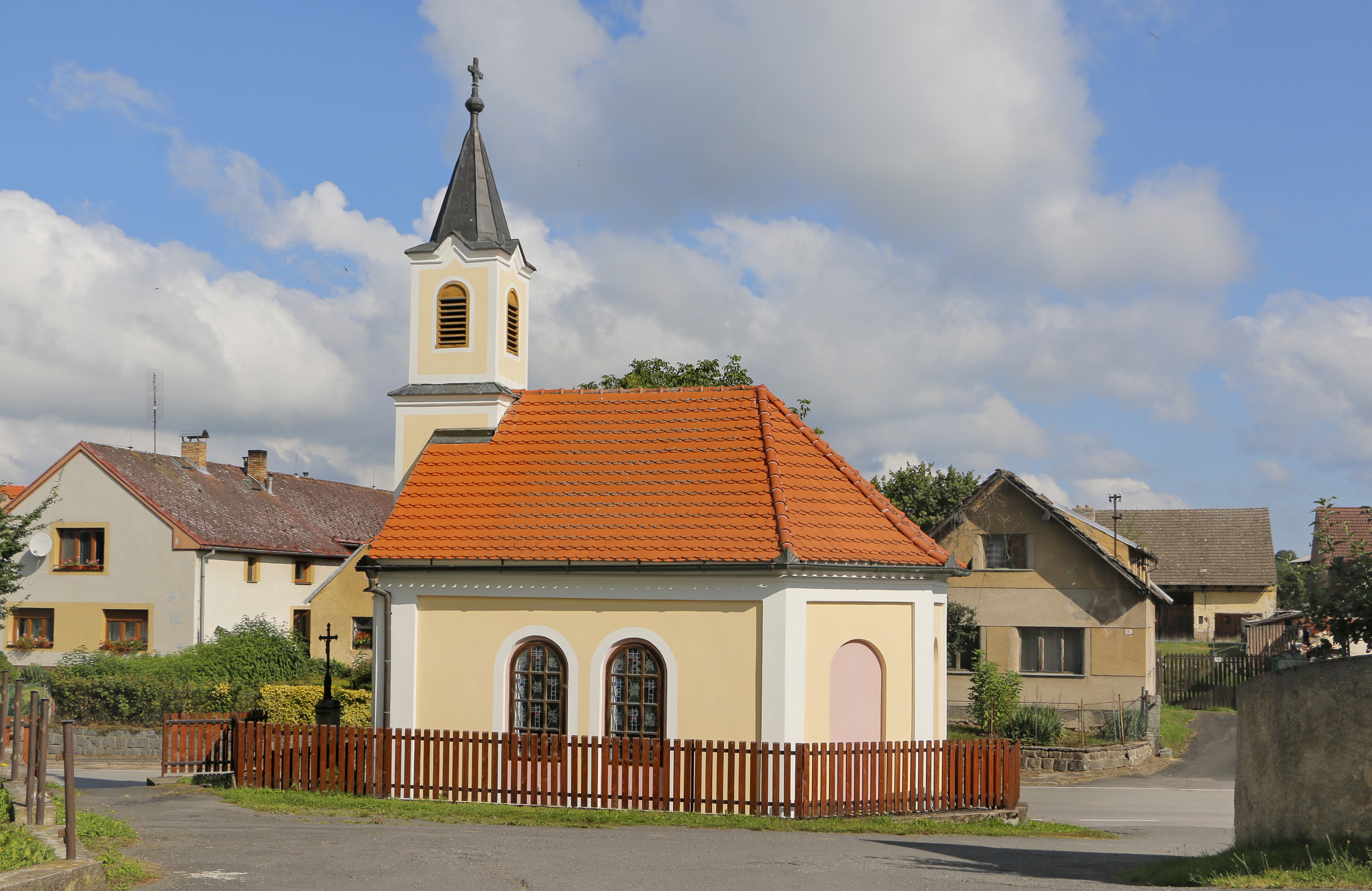
- Chapel in the centre of Předmíř

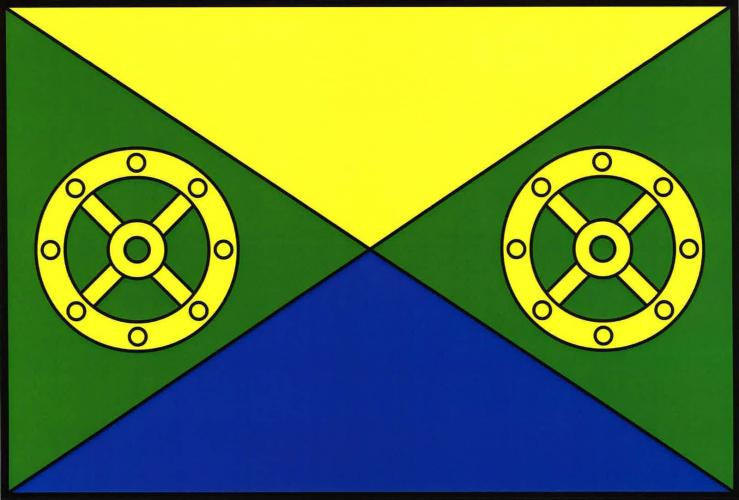
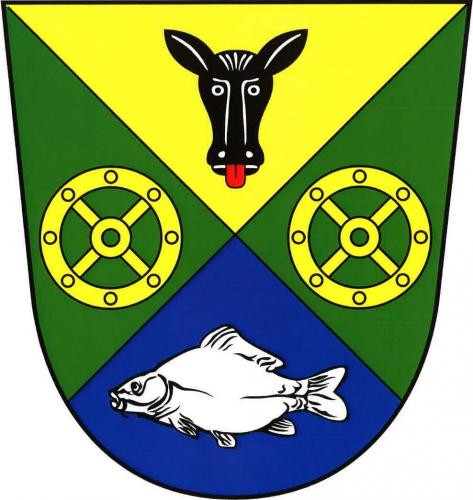
- Flag Coat of arms

- Location in the Czech Republic
- Coordinates: 49°29′22″N 13°46′13″E
- Country: Czech Republic
- Region: South Bohemian
- District: Strakonice
- First mentioned: 1318

Area
  - Total: 10.60 km^{2} (4.09 sq mi)
- Elevation: 491 m (1,611 ft)

Population (2026-01-01)
  - Total: 284
  - Density: 26.8/km^{2} (69.4/sq mi)
- Time zone: UTC+1 (CET)
  - Summer (DST): UTC+2 (CEST)
- Postal code: 387 42
- Website: www.predmir.cz

Předmíř is a municipality and village in Strakonice District in the South Bohemian Region of the Czech Republic. It has about 300 inhabitants.

Předmíř lies approximately 27 kilometres (17 mi) north of Strakonice, 77 km (48 mi) north-west of České Budějovice, and 81 km (50 mi) south-west of Prague.

== Administrative division ==
Předmíř consists of four municipal parts (in brackets population according to the 2021 census):

- Předmíř (154)
- Metly (60)
- Řiště (29)
- Zámlyní (48)

== Demographics ==
Historical population
Year	Pop.	±%
1869	758	—
1880	773	+2.0%
1890	728	−5.8%
1900	713	−2.1%
1910	709	−0.6%
1921	689	−2.8%
1930	609	−11.6%
1950	446	−26.8%
1961	462	+3.6%
1970	384	−16.9%
1980	338	−12.0%
1991	353	+4.4%
2001	309	−12.5%
2011	319	+3.2%
2021	291	−8.8%
Source: Censuses
