= Smetanova Lhota =

- Municipality
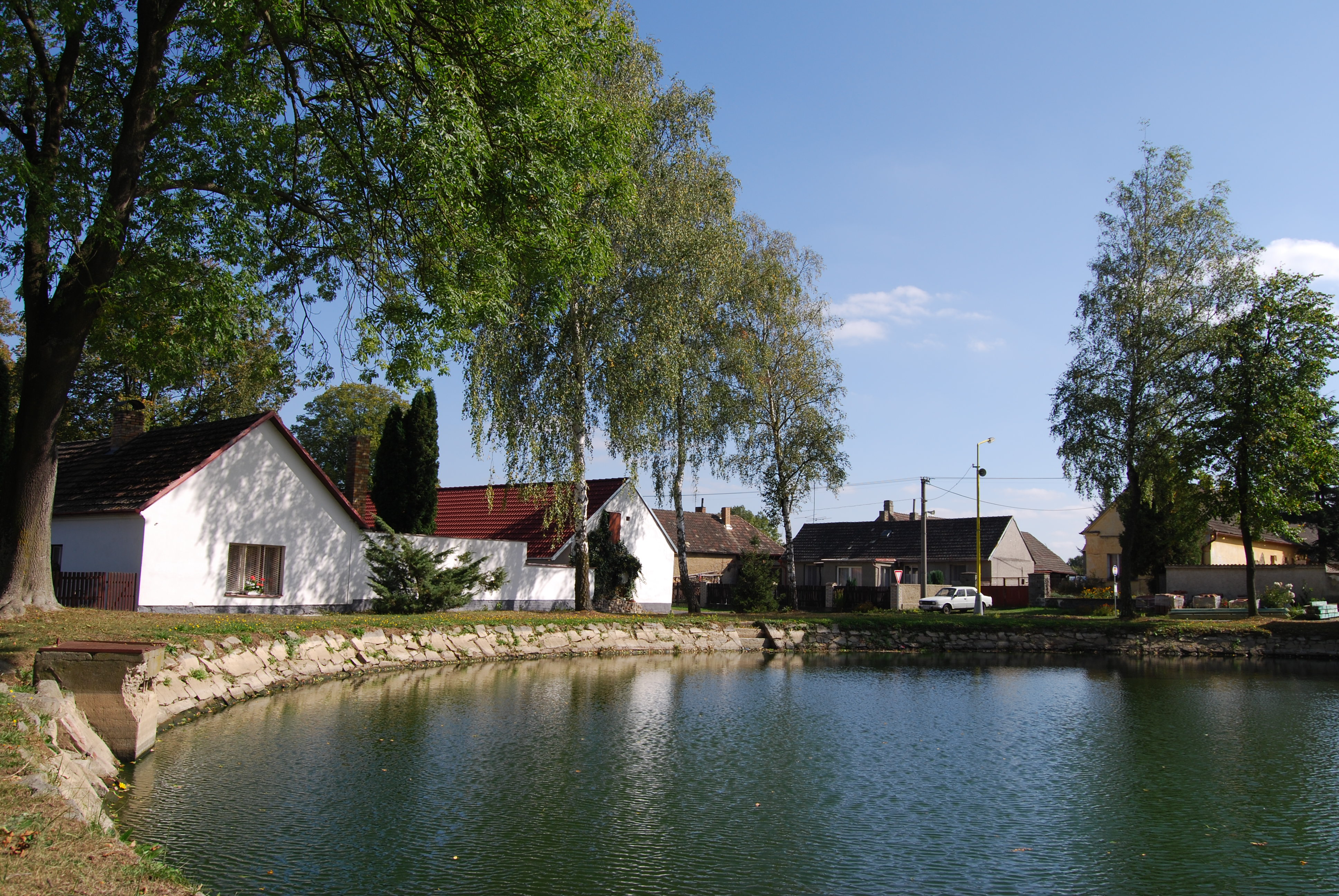
- Pond in Smetanova Lhota

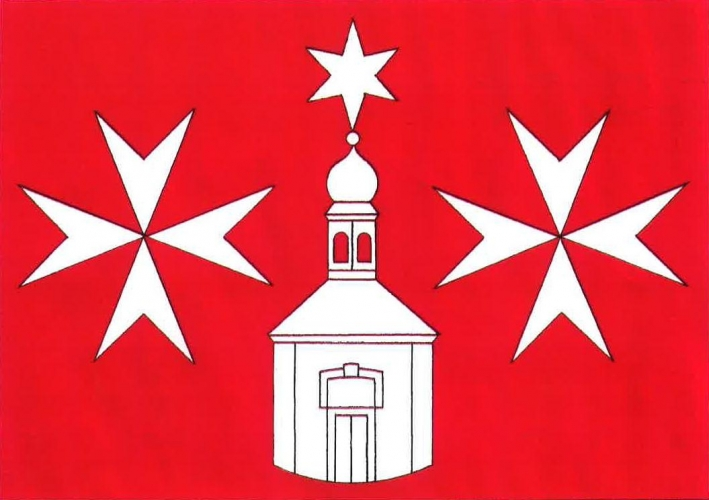
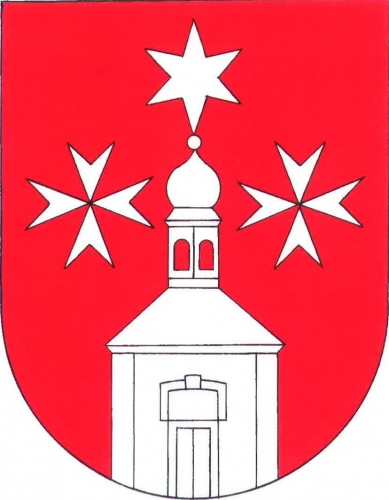
- Flag Coat of arms

- Location in the Czech Republic
- Coordinates: 49°26′52″N 14°5′14″E
- Country: Czech Republic
- Region: South Bohemian Region
- District: Písek
- First mentioned: 1384

Area
  - Total: 13.05 km^{2} (5.04 sq mi)
- Elevation: 413 m (1,355 ft)

Population (2026-01-01)
  - Total: 276
  - Density: 21.1/km^{2} (54.8/sq mi)
- Time zone: UTC+1 (CET)
  - Summer (DST): UTC+2 (CEST)
- Postal code: 398 04
- Website: www.smetanovalhota.cz

Smetanova Lhota is a municipality and village in Písek District in the South Bohemian Region of the Czech Republic. It has about 300 inhabitants.

== Administrative division ==
Smetanova Lhota consists of three municipal parts (in brackets population according to the 2021 census):

- Smetanova Lhota (231)
- Karlov (12)
- Vrábsko (33)

== Demographics ==
Historical population
Year	Pop.	±%
1869	1,054	—
1880	1,039	−1.4%
1890	945	−9.0%
1900	1,008	+6.7%
1910	940	−6.7%
1921	887	−5.6%
1930	788	−11.2%
1950	600	−23.9%
1961	582	−3.0%
1970	433	−25.6%
1980	394	−9.0%
1991	313	−20.6%
2001	265	−15.3%
2011	279	+5.3%
2021	276	−1.1%
Source: Censuses

== Notable people ==
- Jan Koller (born 1973), footballer; raised here and lives here
