= Blatná Uplands =

Topographic feature of the Czech Republic

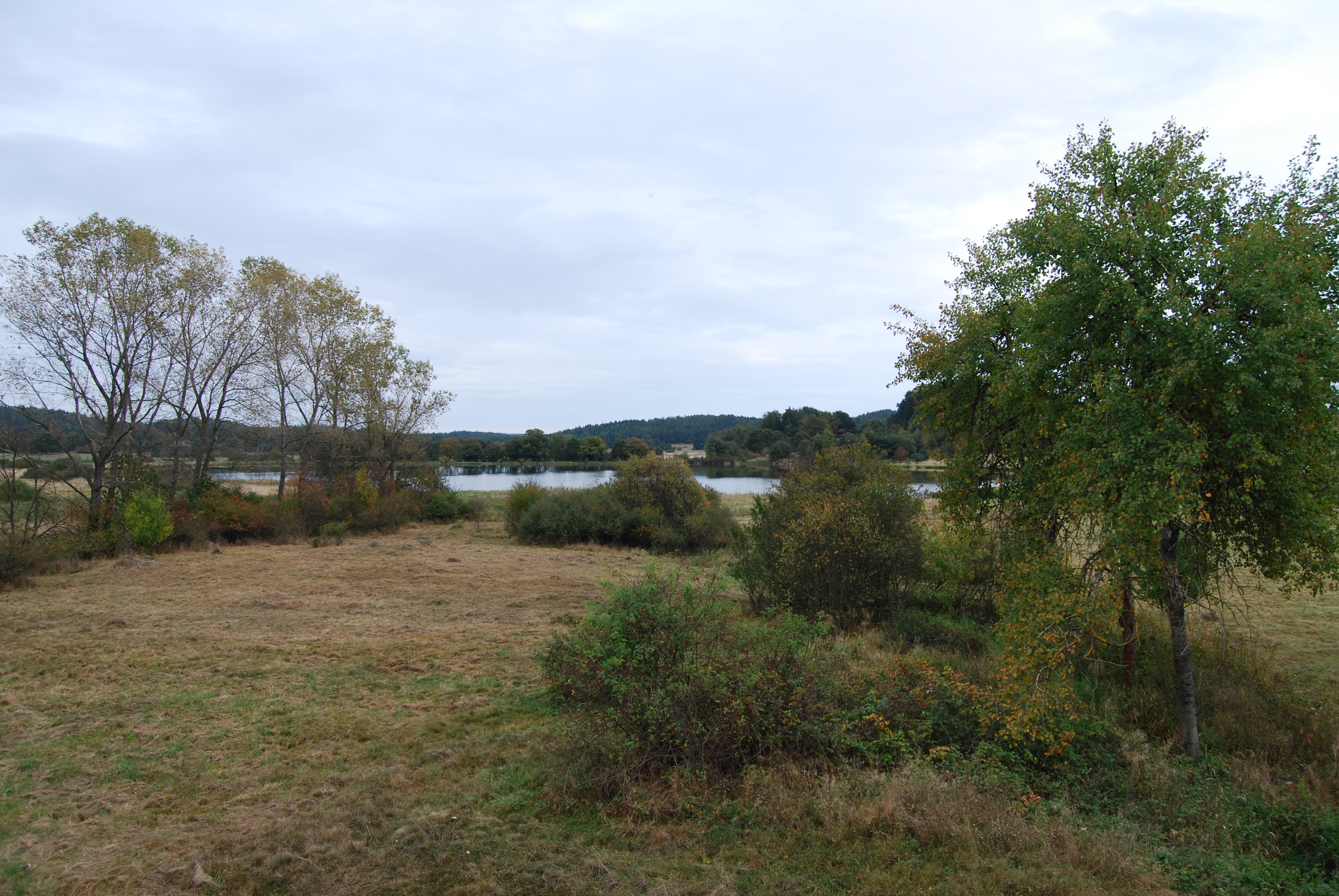
- Kovašínské louky Nature Reserve

Highest point
- Peak: Drkolná
- Elevation: 729 m (2,392 ft)

Dimensions
- Length: 50 km (31 mi)
- Area: 1,087 km^{2} (420 mi^{2})

Geography
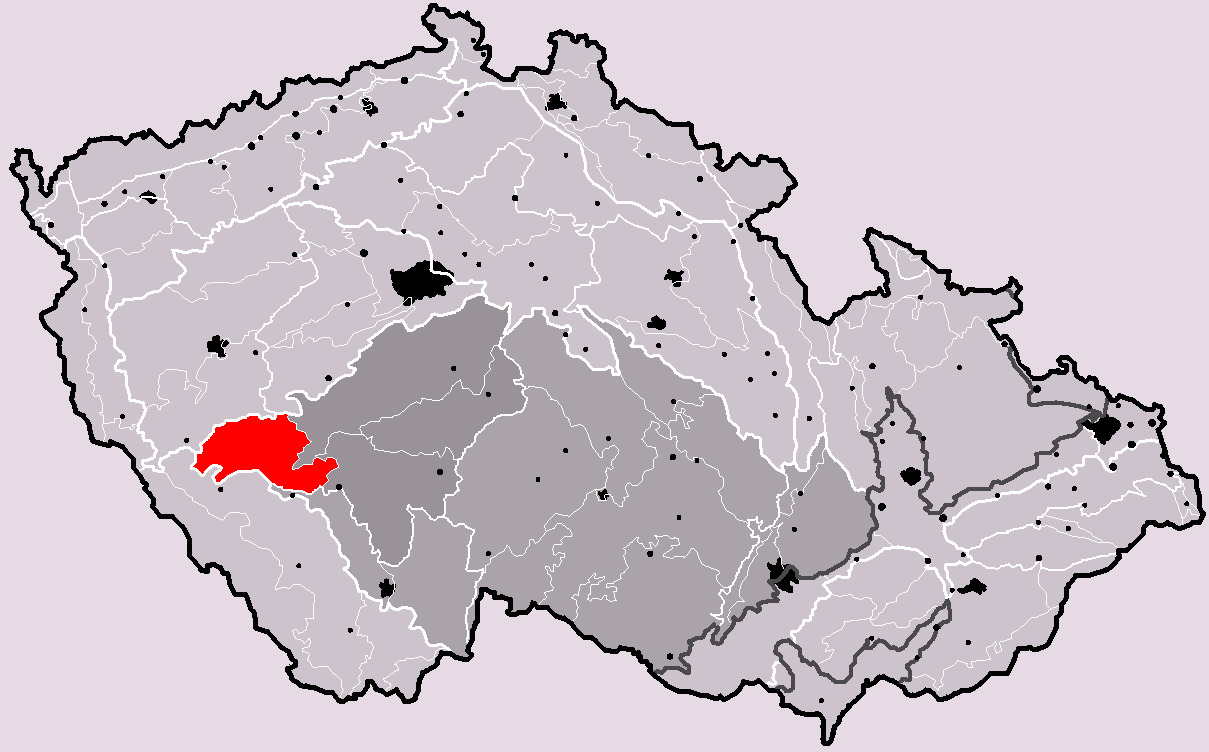
- Blatná Uplands in the geomorphological system of the Czech Republic
- Country: Czech Republic
- Regions: Plzeň, South Bohemian, Central Bohemian
- Range coordinates: 49°24′N 13°43′E
- Parent range: Central Bohemian Hills

Geology
- Rock type(s): Granodiorite, granite

The Blatná Uplands (Czech: Blatenská pahorkatina) are uplands and a geomorphological mesoregion of the Czech Republic. It is located mostly in the Plzeň and South Bohemian regions. It is named after the town of Blatná.

== Geomorphology ==
The Blatná Uplands is a mesoregion of the Central Bohemian Hills within the Bohemian Massif. It is a rugged hilly area with remnants of Neogene aligned surfaces. In the west, the area is tectonically disturbed and there are structural ridges and inselbergs. The uplands are further subdivided into the microregions of Horažďovice Uplands and Nepomuk Highlands.

There are a lot of medium-high hills. The highest peaks are located in the western part of the territory. The highest peaks of the Blatná Uplands are:

- Drkolná, 729 m (2,392 ft)
- Rovná, 724 m (2,375 ft)
- Na Skále, 716 m (2,349 ft)
- Stírka, 706 m (2,316 ft)
- Kovářská, 706 m (2,316 ft)
- Barák, 706 m (2,316 ft)
- Boušový, 700 m (2,300 ft)
- Hůrky, 698 m (2,290 ft)
- Jedlový kopec, 692 m (2,270 ft)
- Kostřáb, 690 m (2,260 ft)
- Smetanec, 690 m (2,260 ft)

== Geography ==
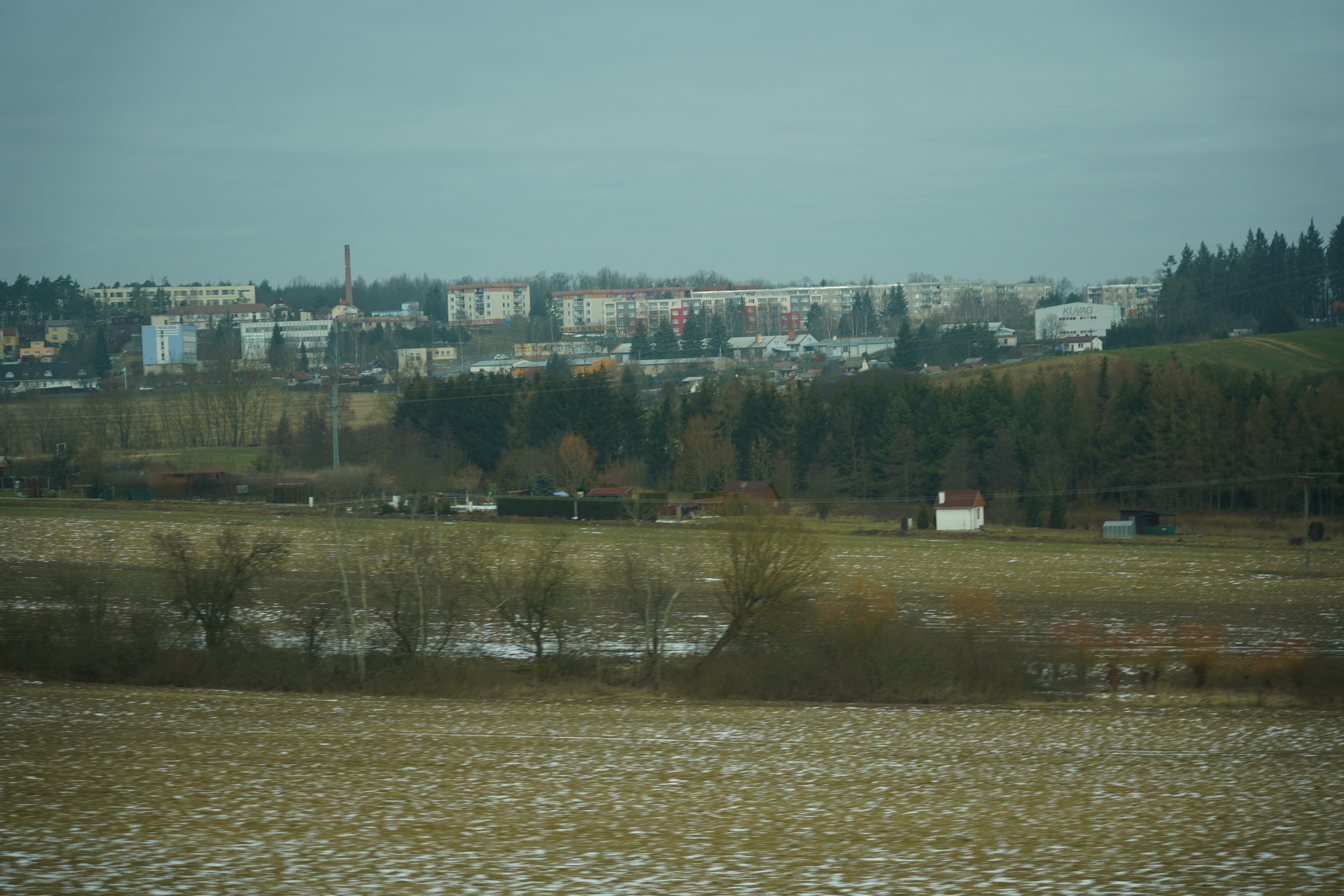
View towards Nepomuk

The Blatná Uplands has a relatively regular shape, slightly elongated from west to east. It lies mostly in the Plzeň and South Bohemian regions, but a small part also extends into the Central Bohemian Region. The territory has an area of 1,087 square kilometres (420 sq mi) and an average elevation of 509 metres (1,670 ft).

The territory is rich in small streams and small fishponds, especially in its central part. The eastern part is drained by the Lomnice River and the western part is drained by the Úslava River. The southern part is drained by the streams that flow into the Otava River, which is located outside the Blatná Uplands. The largest body of water is the fishpond Kovčínský rybník with an area of around 100 ha (250 acres).

There are no large settlements. The most populated towns entirely located in the Blatná Uplands are Blatná, Nepomuk and Plánice. Most of Horažďovice lies in the uplands and the northern part of Strakonice also extends into the uplands.

== Geology ==
The geological bedrock is dominated by granitoids, especially granodiorites.

== Protection of nature ==
There are no large-scale protected areas and only few small-scale protected areas.
