= List of castles in the South Bohemian Region =

This is a list of castles and chateaux located in the South Bohemian Region of the Czech Republic.

== A ==
- Albeř Chateau

== B ==
- Bechyně Chateau
- Beistein Castle
- Blatná Chateau
- Borotín Castle
- Borovany Chateau
- Boršov Castle
- Brandlín Chateau
- Bratronice Chateau
- Brloh Chateau
- Březí u Týna nad Vltavou Chateau
- Budeč Chateau
- Budíškovice Chateau
- Bzí Chateau

== C ==
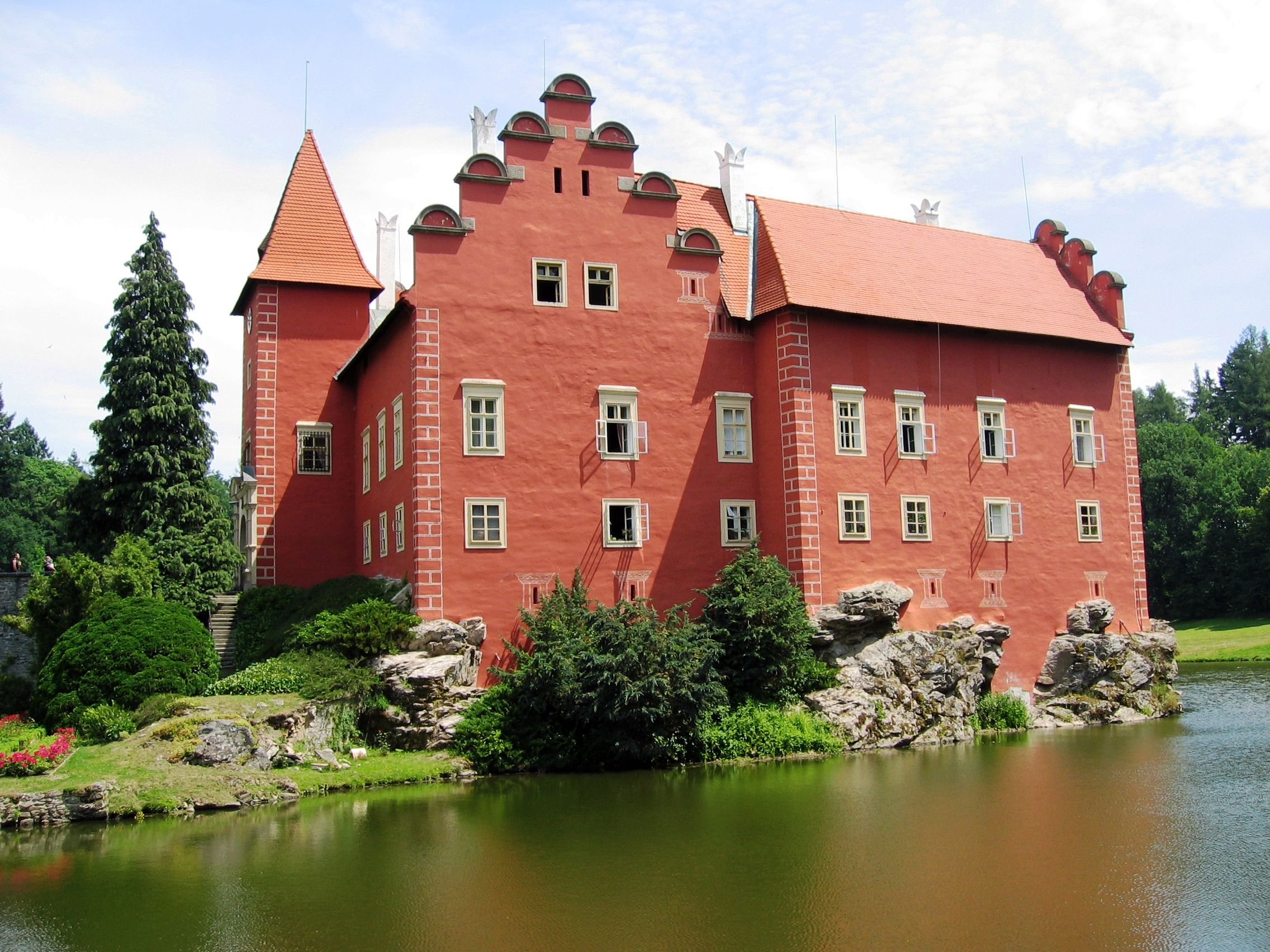
Červená Lhota Chateau

- Cerhonice Chateau
- Chotoviny Chateau
- Choustník Castle
- Chřešťovice Chateau
- Čekanice Chateau
- Černice Chateau
- Červená Lhota Chateau
- Červený Dvůr Chateau
- Český Krumlov Castle
- Český Rudolec Chateau
- Čestice Chateau
- Čimelice Chateau
- Čížová Chateau
- Čkyně Chateau

== D ==
- Dačice Chateau
- Dírná Chateau
- Dívčí Kámen Castle
- Dobronice u Bechyně Castle
- Doubravice Chateau
- Dražíč Chateau
- Drhovle Chateau
- Dřešínek Chateau
- Dříteň Chateau
- Dub Chateau

== H ==
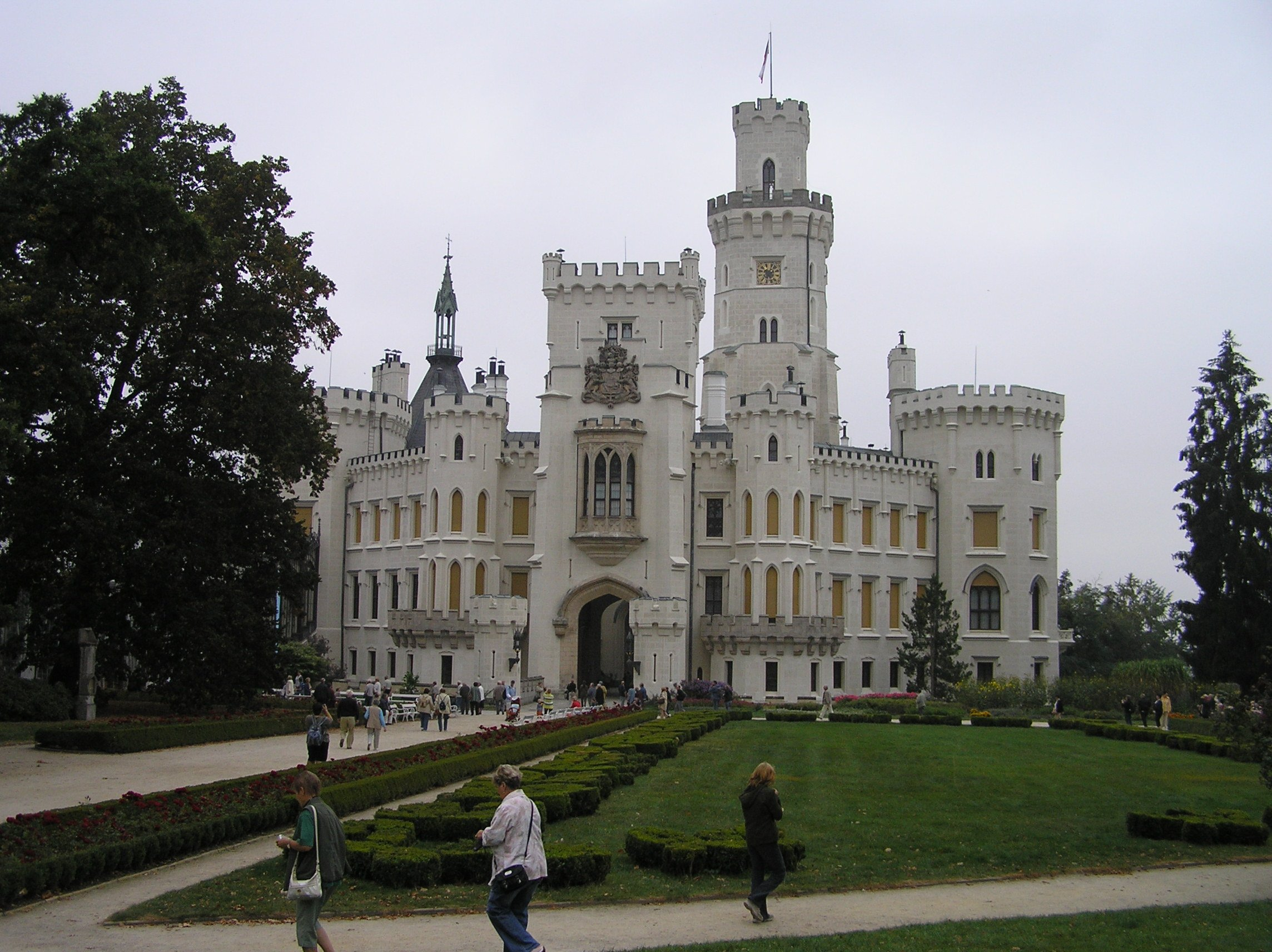
Hluboká nad Vltavou Chateau

- Haselburg Castle
- Hausberk Castle
- Helfenburk Castle
- Hluboká nad Vltavou Chateau
- Hněvkovice Chateau
- Hrad na Stožecké skále Castle
- Hrádek u Purkarce Castle
- Hus Castle

== J ==
- Jemčina Chateau
- Jindřichův Hradec Castle

== K ==
- Kardašova Řečice Castle
- Kardašova Řečice Chateau
- Karlov Chateau
- Kestřany Chateau
- Koloděje nad Lužnicí Chateau
- Komařice Chateau
- Kozí Hrádek Castle
- Kratochvíle Chateau
- Křikava Castle
- Kuglvajt Castle
- Kunžvart Castle

== L ==
- Landštejn Castle
- Lčovice Chateau
- Ledenice Castle
- Libějovice - Starý zámek Chateau
- Lnáře Chateau
- Lom Castle
- Louzek Castle
- Lustenek Chateau
- Lžín Chateau

== M ==
- Maříž Chateau
- Maškovec Castle
- Měšice Castle
- Mladá Vožice Castle
- Myšenec Castle

== N ==
- Nadějkov Chateau
- Nemyšl Chateau
- Neznašov Chateau
- Němčice Chateau
- Nová Bystřice Chateau
- Nová Včelnice Chateau
- Nové Hrady Castle
- Nový zámek Chateau

== O ==
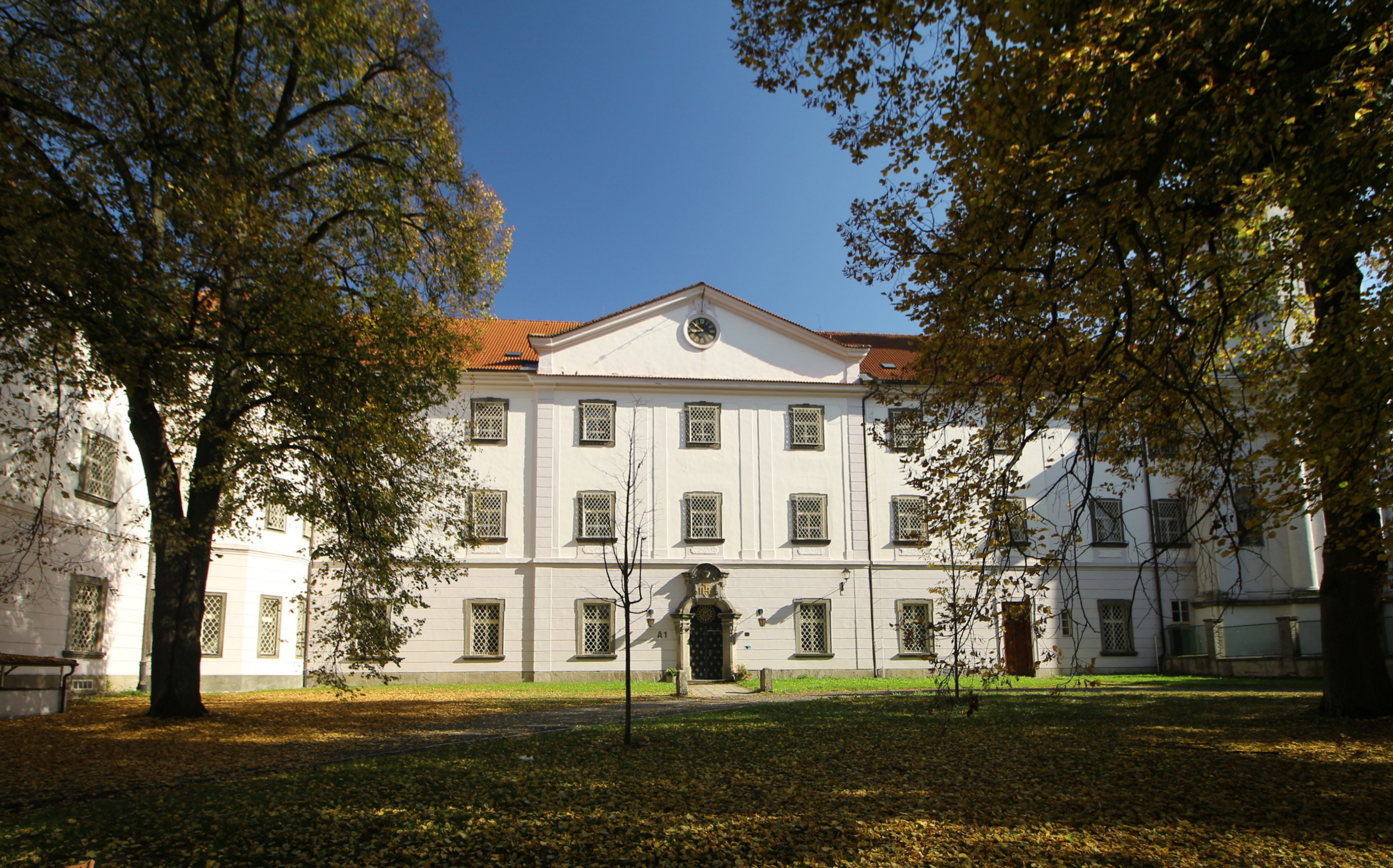
Opařany Castle

- Ohrada Chateau
- Olešnice Chateau
- Oltyně Chateau
- Omlenička Chateau
- Opařany Castle
- Orlík nad Vltavou Castle
- Osek Chateau
- Ostrolovský Újezd Chateau

== P ==
- Písečné Chateau
- Písek Castle
- Pluhův Žďár Chateau
- Poděhusy Castle
- Pomezí Castle
- Pořešín Castle
- Poříčí Chateau
- Přečín Chateau
- Příběnice Castle
- Příběničky Castle
- Protivín Chateau

== R ==
- Radenín Chateau
- Rožmberk Castle
- Rudolfov Chateau

== S ==
- Sedlice Chateau
- Soběslav Castle
- Sokolčí Castle
- Staré Hobzí Chateau
- Stádlec Chateau
- Strakonice Castle
- Střela Castle
- Střela Chateau
- Stráž nad Nežárkou Chateau
- Studená Chateau
- Šelmberk Castle
- Škvořetice Chateau
- Štěchovice Chateau
- Štěkeň Chateau

== T ==
- Tábor Castle
- Trhové Sviny Castle
- Třeboň Chateau
- Tučapy Chateau
- Tůmův vrch Chateau
- Týn nad Vltavou Castle
- Týn nad Vltavou Chateau

== U ==
- Údolský Hrádek Castle

== V ==
- Varvažov Chateau
- Velešín Castle
- Veselíčko Chateau
- Vimperk Chateau
- Vitějovice Castle
- Vítkův Hrádek Castle
- Vlachovo Březí Chateau
- Vodice Chateau
- Vráž Chateau

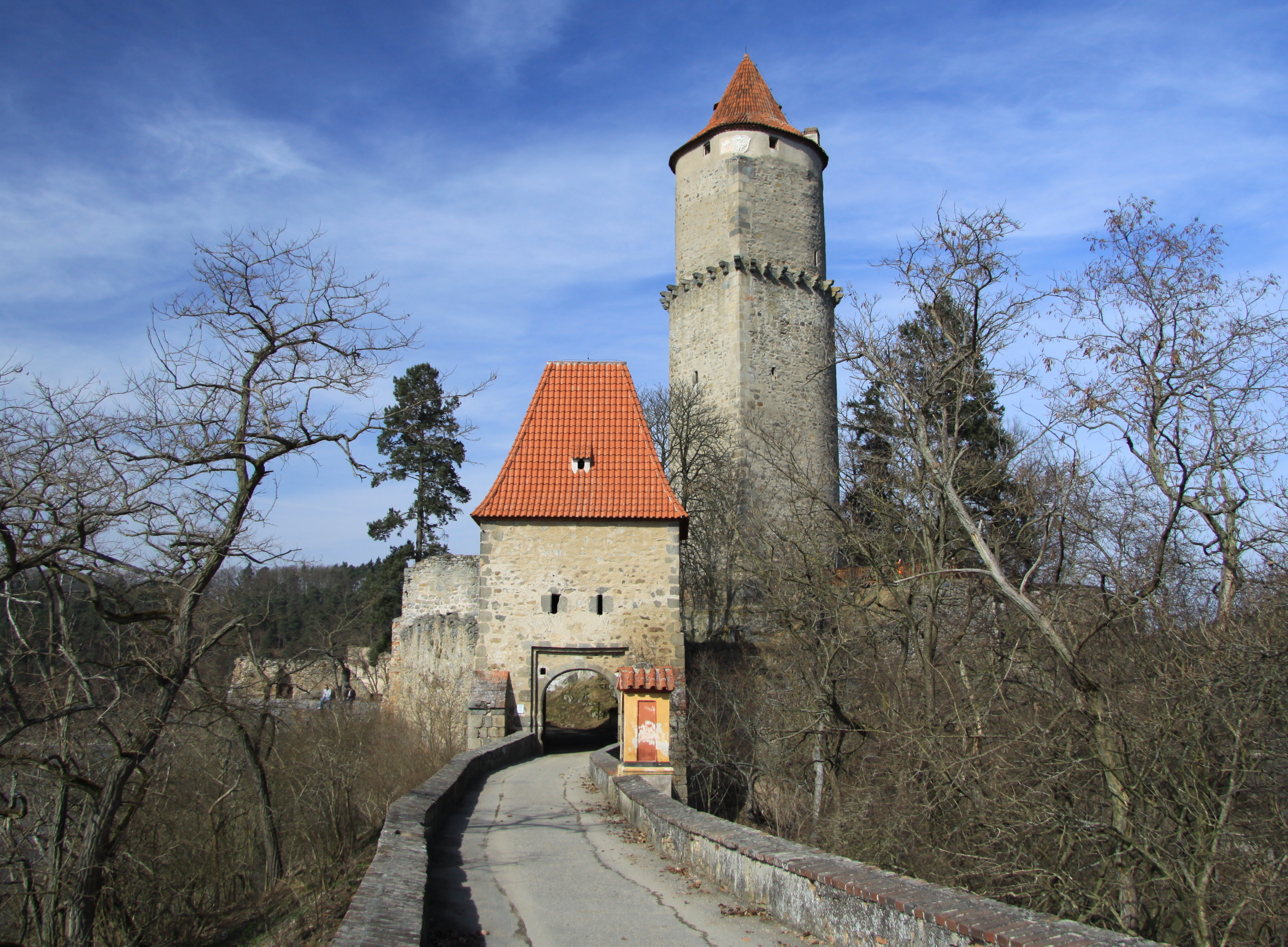
Zvíkov Castle

== Z ==
- Zálší Chateau
- Zdíkov Chateau
- Zvíkov Castle

== See also ==
- List of castles in the Czech Republic
- List of castles in Europe
- List of castles
