= Hoslovice =

- Municipality
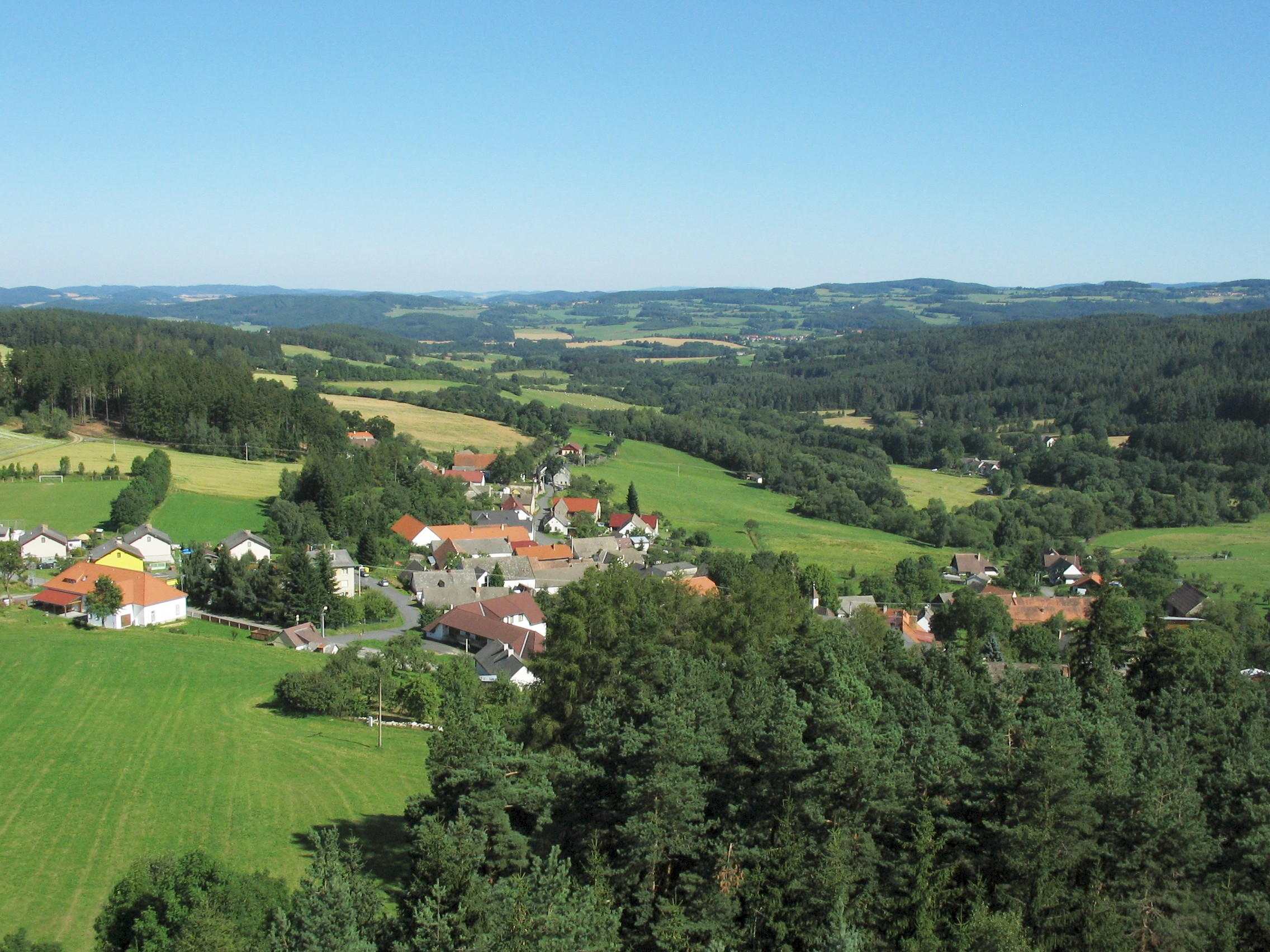
- View from the northwest

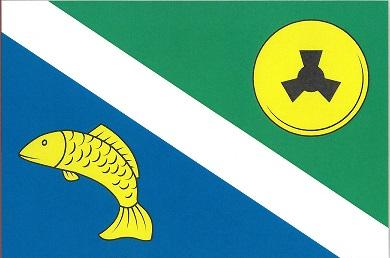
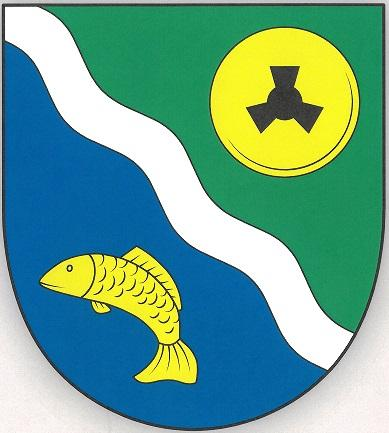
- Flag Coat of arms

- Location in the Czech Republic
- Coordinates: 49°11′29″N 13°45′47″E
- Country: Czech Republic
- Region: South Bohemian
- District: Strakonice
- First mentioned: 1352

Area
  - Total: 10.78 km^{2} (4.16 sq mi)
- Elevation: 618 m (2,028 ft)

Population (2026-01-01)
  - Total: 187
  - Density: 17.3/km^{2} (44.9/sq mi)
- Time zone: UTC+1 (CET)
  - Summer (DST): UTC+2 (CEST)
- Postal codes: 387 16, 387 19
- Website: www.hoslovice.cz

Hoslovice is a municipality and village in Strakonice District in the South Bohemian Region of the Czech Republic. It has about 200 inhabitants. Hoslovice is known for probably the oldest water mill in the Czech Republic, which dates from the 16th century at the latest and is protected as a national cultural monument.

== Administrative division ==
Hoslovice consists of three municipal parts (in brackets population according to the 2021 census):

- Hoslovice (83)
- Hodějov (62)
- Škrobočov (14)

== Geography ==
Hoslovice is located about 13 kilometres (8 mi) southwest of Strakonice and 56 km (35 mi) northwest of České Budějovice. It lies in the Bohemian Forest Foothills. The highest point is the hill Mladotický vrch at 703 m (2,306 ft) above sea level.

== History ==
The first written mention of Hoslovice is in a deed of the Knights of the Cross with the Red Star from 1352. For centuries, it belonged to the Němčice estate and shared its owners.

== Demographics ==
Historical population

Year	Pop.	±%
1869	666	—
1880	714	+7.2%
1890	712	−0.3%
1900	720	+1.1%
1910	718	−0.3%

Year	Pop.	±%
1921	699	−2.6%
1930	648	−7.3%
1950	429	−33.8%
1961	409	−4.7%
1970	352	−13.9%

Year	Pop.	±%
1980	263	−25.3%
1991	194	−26.2%
2001	180	−7.2%
2011	166	−7.8%
2021	159	−4.2%

Source: Censuses

== Transport ==
There are no railways or major roads passing through the municipality.

== Sights ==
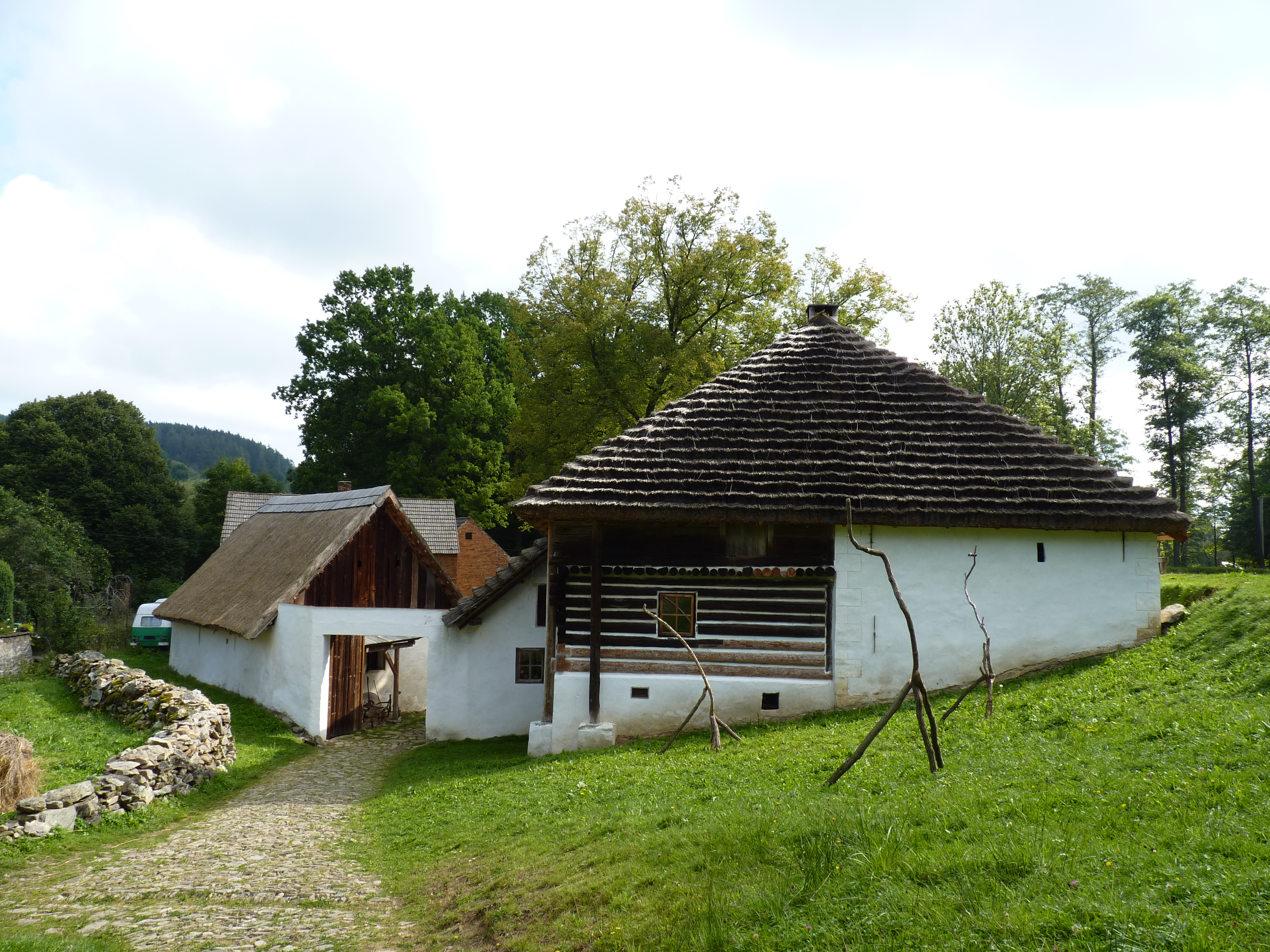
Hoslovice water mill

The most important monument is the Hoslovice water mill. It has a functional grinding device. The mill allegedly existed here already in 1352, which makes it the oldest water mill in today's Czech Republic. Analysis of the age of the wood in the ceiling of the granary confirms the existence of the mill in 1568–1569. For its value, the building is protected as a national cultural monument. Nowadays, it houses an exhibition for visitors.

The Chapel of Saint Wenceslaus is located in the centre of Hoslovice. It was built in the 18th century and rebuilt into its present form in 1934.

There is a telecommunications transmitter here, which also serves as an observation tower. The transmitter is 50 m (160 ft) high and the viewing platform is 29 m (95 ft) high.
