= Stolpersteine in Prague-Podolí =

Memorial installations in Czech Republic

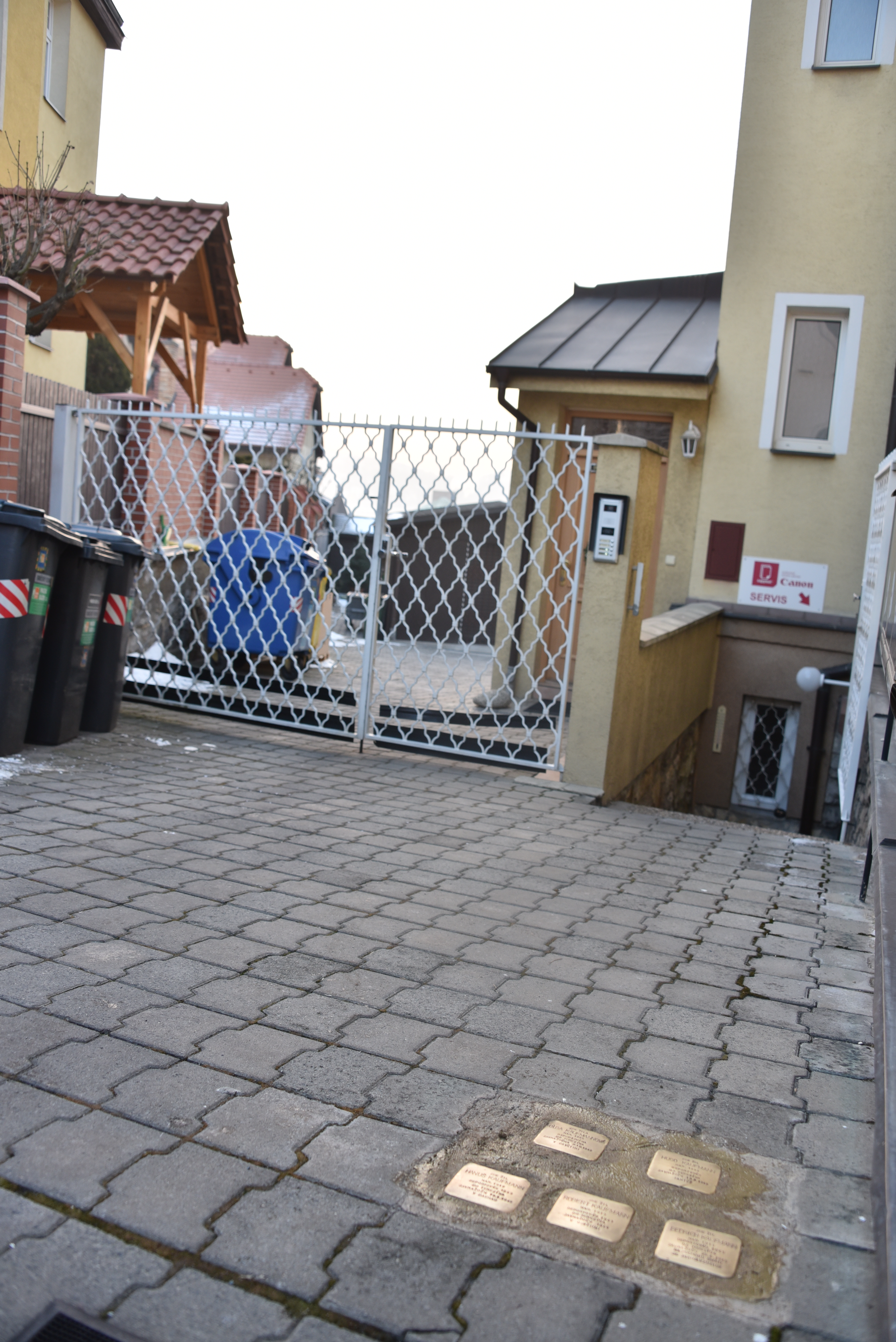
Stolpersteine for family Kaufmann in Prague

This article lists the Stolpersteine in the district Podolí of Prague. Since 2002, the district belongs to Praha 4. Stolpersteine is the German name for stumbling blocks collocated all over Europe by German artist Gunter Demnig. They remember the fate of the Nazi victims being murdered, deported, exiled or driven to suicide.

Generally, the stumbling blocks are posed in front of the building where the victims had their last self chosen residence. The name of the Stolpersteine in Czech is: Kameny zmizelých, stones of the disappeared.

== Podolí ==
Stone	Name	Location	Life and death
	Bedřich Kaufmann	Lopatecká 161/17; Praha 4-Podolí	Bedřich Kaufmann was born on 25 November 1911 in Prague. His first name is also written Bedrikh or in the German version Friedrich. He was the son of Hugo Kaufmann and Olga née Ehrmann. He had two younger brothers: Robert (born 1913) and Hanuš (born 1917). He was a merchant. On 4 December 1941 he was deported from Prague to Theresienstadt concentration camp by transport J. His number on this transport was 194 of 1,000. On 18 December 1943 he was deported to Auschwitz concentration camp by transport Ds. His number on this transport was 474 of 2,503. His inmate number in Auschwitz, tattooed on the left arm, was 85587. When the Red Army approached Auschwitz in early 1945, most inmates of the KZ were sent on death marches toward west. The group in which Kaufmann had to march was later called the Hungermarsch by one of the inmates, Friedrich Kraj. It was geared toward Theresienstadt. When exhausted inmates — without enough food, without proper cloths, without proper shoes — broke down they were shot by the SS. On 23 April 1945, when the group reached the Khaatal near Schwarzheide, Bedřich Kaufmann was murdered by the Nazi regime. Memorial stones in Khaatal (for the victims of the death march) and on the cemetery of Prague-Olšanský (for all five murdered members of his family) remind of Bedřich Kaufmann.
	Hanuš Kaufmann	Lopatecká 161/17; Praha 4-Podolí	Hanuš Kaufmann, also Hans Kaufman, was born on 20 April 1917 in Prague. He was the son of Hugo Kaufmann and Olga née Ehrmann. He had two older brothers, Bedřich (born 1911) and Robert (born 1913). He was a clerk and single. His last residence before deportation was in Prague II, Soukenická 14. On 13 July 1943 he was deported from Prague to Theresienstadt concentration camp by transport Di. His number on this transport was 292 of 839. On 1 October 1944 he was deported to Auschwitz concentration camp by transport Em. His number on this transport was 521 of 1,501. His lost his life on 19 January 1945 in Dachau concentration camp. Also his parents and his brothers were killed in the course of the Shoah.
	Hugo Kaufmann	Lopatecká 161/17; Praha 4-Podolí	Hugo Kaufmann was born on 3 June 1883 in Ratková, Banská Bystrica Region. His parents were Adolf and Regina Kaufmann. He had at least one sister, Olga, later named Bodo. He was an industrialist and married Olga née Ehrmann. The couple had at least three sons, Bedřich (born 1911), Robert (born 1913) and Hanuš (born 1917). He was deported to Theresienstadt concentration camp at an unknown date. He was murdered there on 17 July 1942. His wife and all three sons were also murdered in the course of the Shoah. The report of his death to Yad Vashem was filled by his sister, who survived.
	Robert Kaufmann	Lopatecká 161/17; Praha 4-Podolí	Robert Kaufmann was born 1913. He was the son of Hugo Kaufmann and Olga née Ehrmann. He had two brothers, Bedřich (born 1911) and Hanuš (born 1917). He was an industrialist and married. His last residence before deportation was in Prague XII, Lucemburská 16. On 4 December 1941 he was deported from Prague to Theresienstadt concentration camp by transport J. His number on this transport was 745 of 1,000. On 19 October 1943 he was deported to Auschwitz concentration camp by transport Es. His number on this transport was 1163 of 1,500. He lost his life there. Also his parents and his brothers were killed in the course of the Shoah.
	Olga Kaufmannová née Ehrmann	Lopatecká 161/17; Praha 4-Podolí	Olga Kaufmannová née Ehrmann was born on 14 February 1886 in Osek, Písek District. She was the daughter of Sigmund or Zigmund Ehrmann (1854-1935) and Julia née Kafka, also Julie or Yulia (1854-1939). She had two brothers and three sisters: Martha (later named Weiskopf, 1884-1942), Fanny (later named Klein, 1888-1943), Rudolf (1891-1983), Jindra (1895-1975) and Ida (later named Bergman, dates of birth and death unknown). She married Hugo Kaufmann. The couple had at least three sons, Bedřich (born 1911), Robert (born 1913) and Hanuš (born 1917). It is not known how and when she arrived at Auschwitz concentration camp. But she is listed in the Auschwitz Death Registers. She lost her life on 7 October 1942 in Auschwitz. Her husband and all three sons were murdered in the course of the Shoah. Her sister Martha, then a widow, was sent to Maly Trostenets extermination camp and killed there. Most probably also her sister Fanny was killed by the Nazi regime. Her brothers could survive. Jindra died 1975 in an unknown location, Rudolf 1983 in Kiryat Bialik, Haifa.
	Kamila Leknerová née Grafová	Podolská 293/154; Praha 4-Podolí	Kamila Leknerová née Grafová was born on 5 April 1868. She was deported to Theresienstadt concentration camp on 20 June 1942 by transport AAe. Her transport number was 349 of 1,005. There she was murdered by the Nazi regime on 13 May 1943.

== Dates of collocations ==
According to the website of Gunter Demnig the Stolpersteine of Prague were posed on 8 October 2008, 7 November 2009, 12 June 2010, 13 to 15 July 2011 and on 17 July 2013 by the artist himself. A further collocation occurred on 28 October 2012, but is not mentioned on Demnig's page.

The Czech Stolperstein project was initiated in 2008 by the Česká unie židovské mládeže (Czech Union of Jewish Youth) and was realized with the patronage of the Mayor of Prague.

== See also ==
- List of places with Stolpersteine
- Stolpersteine in the Czech Republic
