= Bratronice =

Bratronice may refer to places in the Czech Republic:

- Bratronice (Kladno District), a municipality and village in the Central Bohemian Region
- Bratronice (Strakonice District), a municipality and village in the South Bohemian Region
- Bratronice, a village and part of Smilovice (Mladá Boleslav District) in the Central Bohemian Region
