= Netolice =

- Town
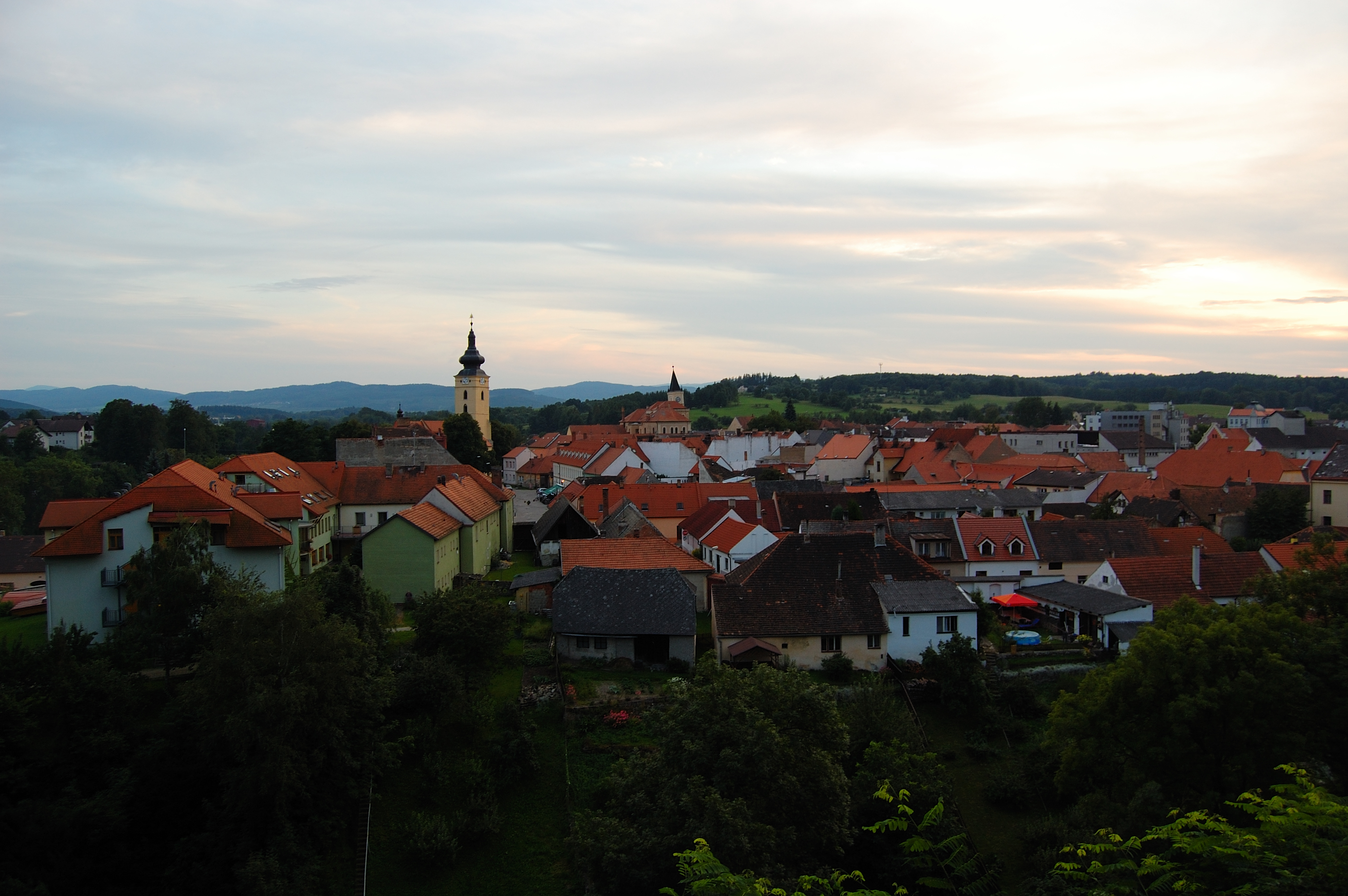
- Panorama of Netolice

- Location in the Czech Republic
- Coordinates: 49°2′58″N 14°11′49″E
- Country: Czech Republic
- Region: South Bohemian
- District: Prachatice
- First mentioned: 981

Government
  - Mayor: Vladimír Pešek

Area
  - Total: 26.35 km^{2} (10.17 sq mi)
- Elevation: 432 m (1,417 ft)

Population (2026-01-01)
  - Total: 2,494
  - Density: 94.65/km^{2} (245.1/sq mi)
- Time zone: UTC+1 (CET)
  - Summer (DST): UTC+2 (CEST)
- Postal code: 384 11
- Website: www.netolice.cz

Netolice (Czech pronunciation: [ˈnɛtolɪtsɛ]; German: Netolitz) is a town in Prachatice District in the South Bohemian Region of the Czech Republic. It has about 2,500 inhabitants. The town is located on the stream Bezdrevský potok in the Bohemian Forest Foothills.

Netolice was probably founded in the 10th century. The historic town centre is well preserved and is protected as an urban monument zone. The most important monument is the Kratochvíle Castle, protected as a national cultural monument.

== Administrative division ==
Netolice consists of two municipal parts (in brackets population according to the 2021 census):

- Netolice (2,254)
- Petrův Dvůr (267)

== Etymology ==
The name is derived from the personal name Netol, meaning "the village of Netol's people".

== Geography ==
Netolice is located about 14 kilometres (9 mi) northeast of Prachatice and 20 km (12 mi) west of České Budějovice. It lies in the Bohemian Forest Foothills. The highest point is the hill Jedlový vrch at 571 m (1,873 ft) above sea level. The stream Bezdrevský potok flows through the town. The municipal territory is rich in fishponds.

== History ==
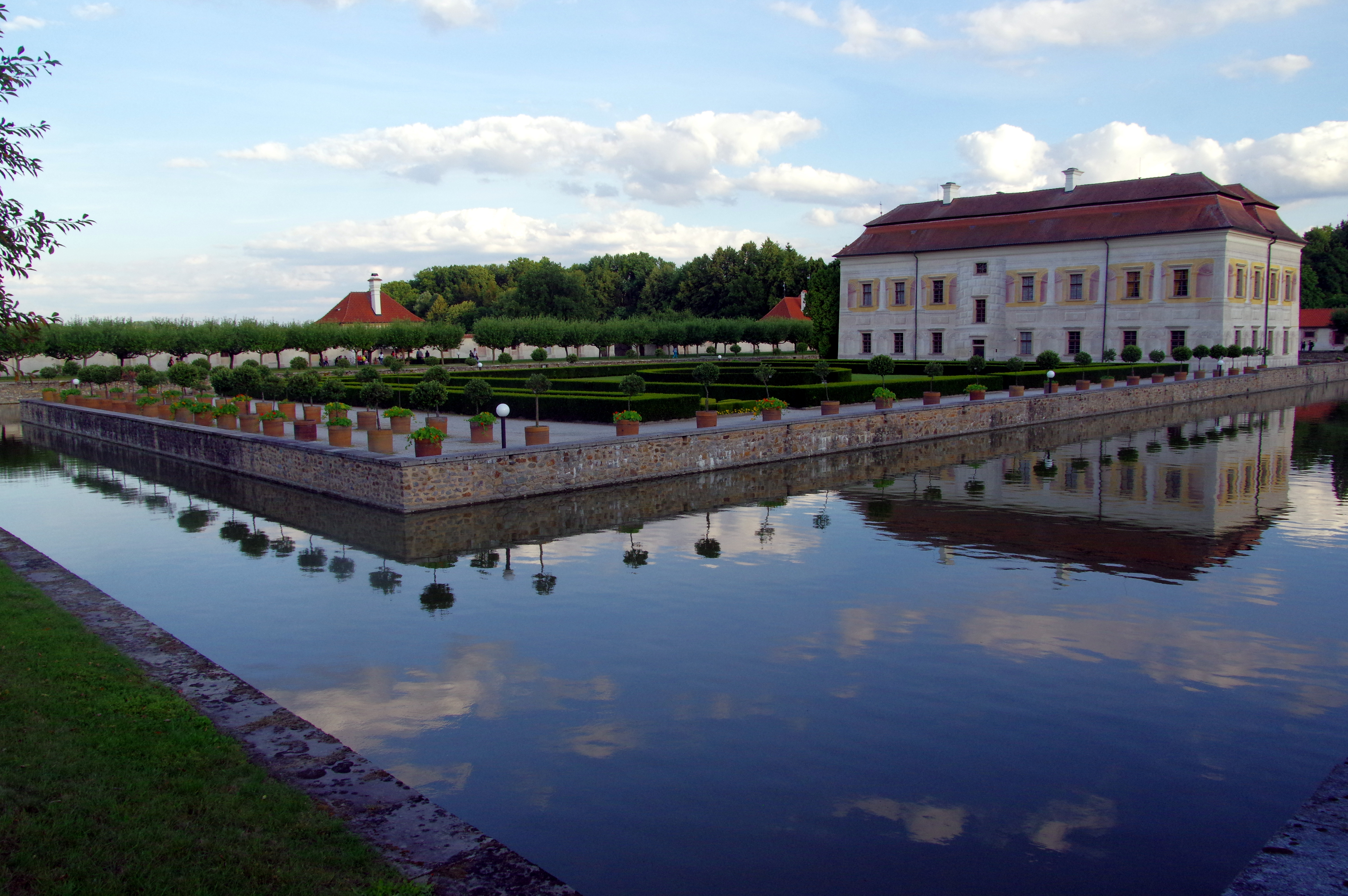
Kratochvíle Castle

The Slavic tribe settled the area probably already in the 8th century and was one of the first in Bohemia. The first written mention of Netolice is from 981, after the castle in Netolice was mentioned in Chronica Boemorum. After the massacre of Slavník dynasty in 995, the Netolice castle became the property of the ruling Přemyslid dynasty. The settlement was established below the castle around the Church of Saint Wenceslaus. Netolice became the administrative and trade centre of the region for its location on the crossroads of important trade routes.

Netolice obtained market privileges from King George of Poděbrady in 1468. At the beginning of the 16th century, the town was acquired by the Rosenberg family. The town prospered and developed, but this ended with the advent of the Thirty Years' War, after Netolice was conquered and burned by the army of General Henri Duval Dampierre in 1619. The town recovered only slowly. In 1622, the estate was bought by the Eggenberg family. In 1719, the estate was acquired by the Schwarzenberg family. The town's second era of prosperity occurred in the 18th and 19th centuries, when new schools, the town hall and the railway were built.

== Demographics ==
Historical population

Year	Pop.	±%
1869	3,136	—
1880	3,508	+11.9%
1890	3,287	−6.3%
1900	3,270	−0.5%
1910	3,411	+4.3%

Year	Pop.	±%
1921	3,018	−11.5%
1930	2,787	−7.7%
1950	2,474	−11.2%
1961	2,507	+1.3%
1970	2,448	−2.4%

Year	Pop.	±%
1980	2,568	+4.9%
1991	2,650	+3.2%
2001	2,620	−1.1%
2011	2,595	−1.0%
2021	2,521	−2.9%

Source: Censuses

== Transport ==
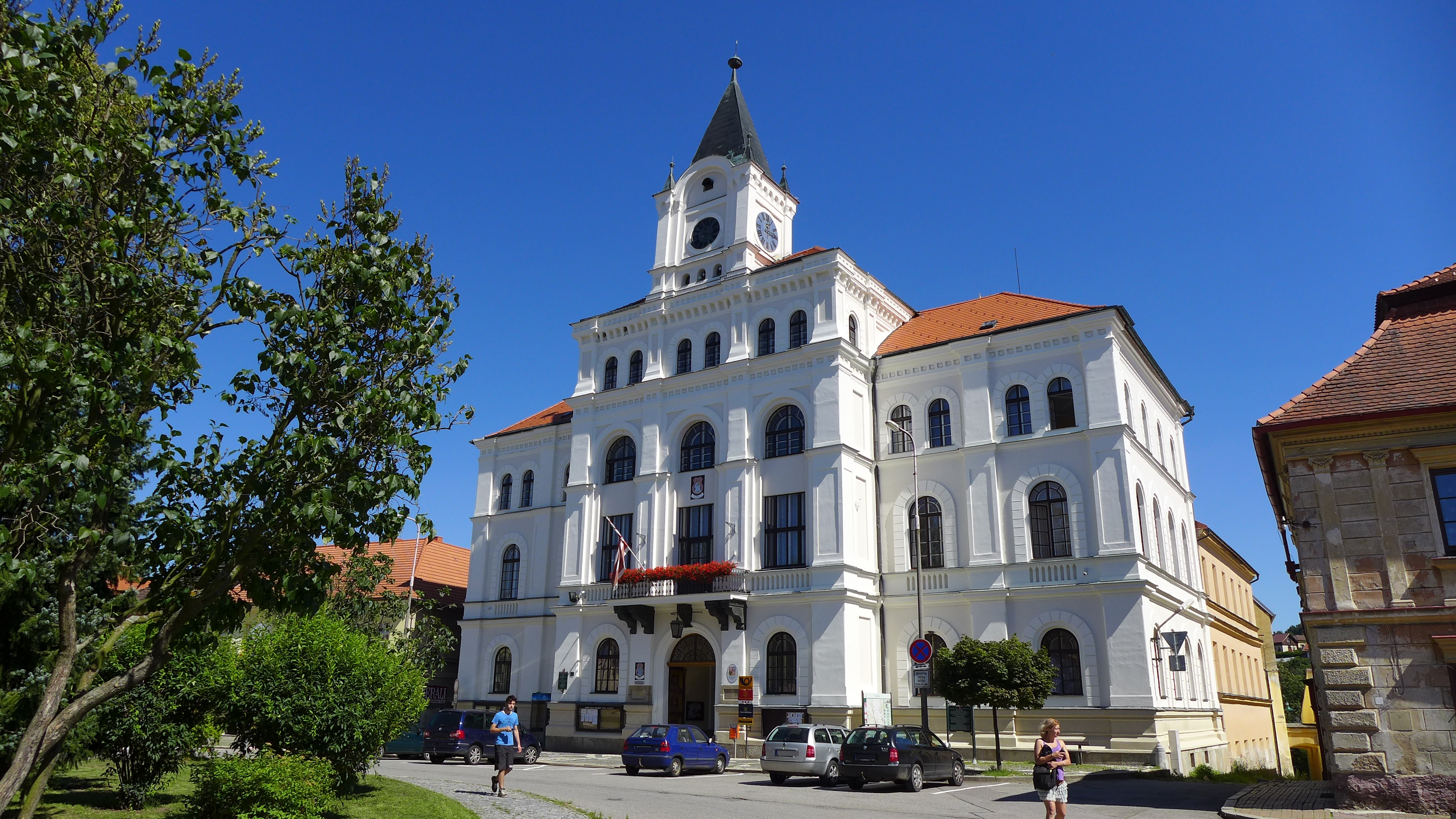
Town hall

There are no major roads passing through the town. The railway that starts here is unused.

== Sights ==
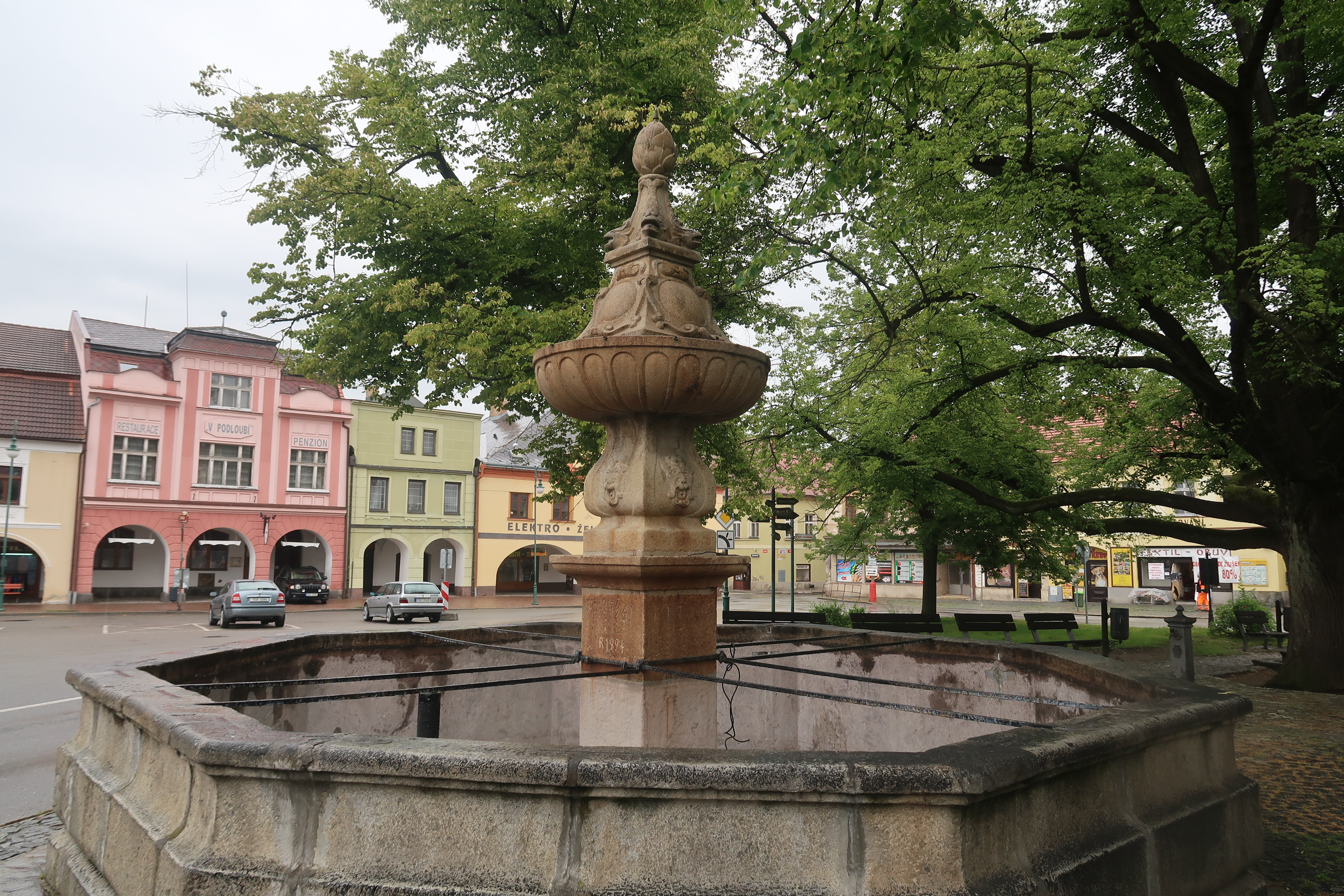
Fountain on the town square

Netolice is known for the Kratochvíle Castle, located in Petrův Dvůr. It is a Renaissance castle from 1583, built as a hunting castle for William of Rosenberg in the style of Italian villas. For its value, it is protected as a national cultural monument.

The historic core of Netolice is an urban monument zone. The most valuable monuments are the town hall building and two churches. The town hall is the main landmark of the town square. It is a Neo-Renaissance building from 1869. The Baroque fountain on the square is from 1677.

The Church of Saint Wenceslaus is originally a Gothic building with Romanesque elements. It was built in the second half of the 13th century and has a Renaissance tower. The Church of the Assumption of the Virgin Mary was also built in the second half of the 13th century. In the 17th century, early Baroque reconstructions were made.

The Mnich pond was founded in the 15th or 16th century. There are two historically valuable stone arch bridges in the dam.

== Notable people ==
- Josef Štěpánek Netolický (c. 1460 – 1539), fishpond builder and architect

== Twin towns – sister cities ==
Netolice is twinned with:

- Ringelai, Germany

== Gallery ==
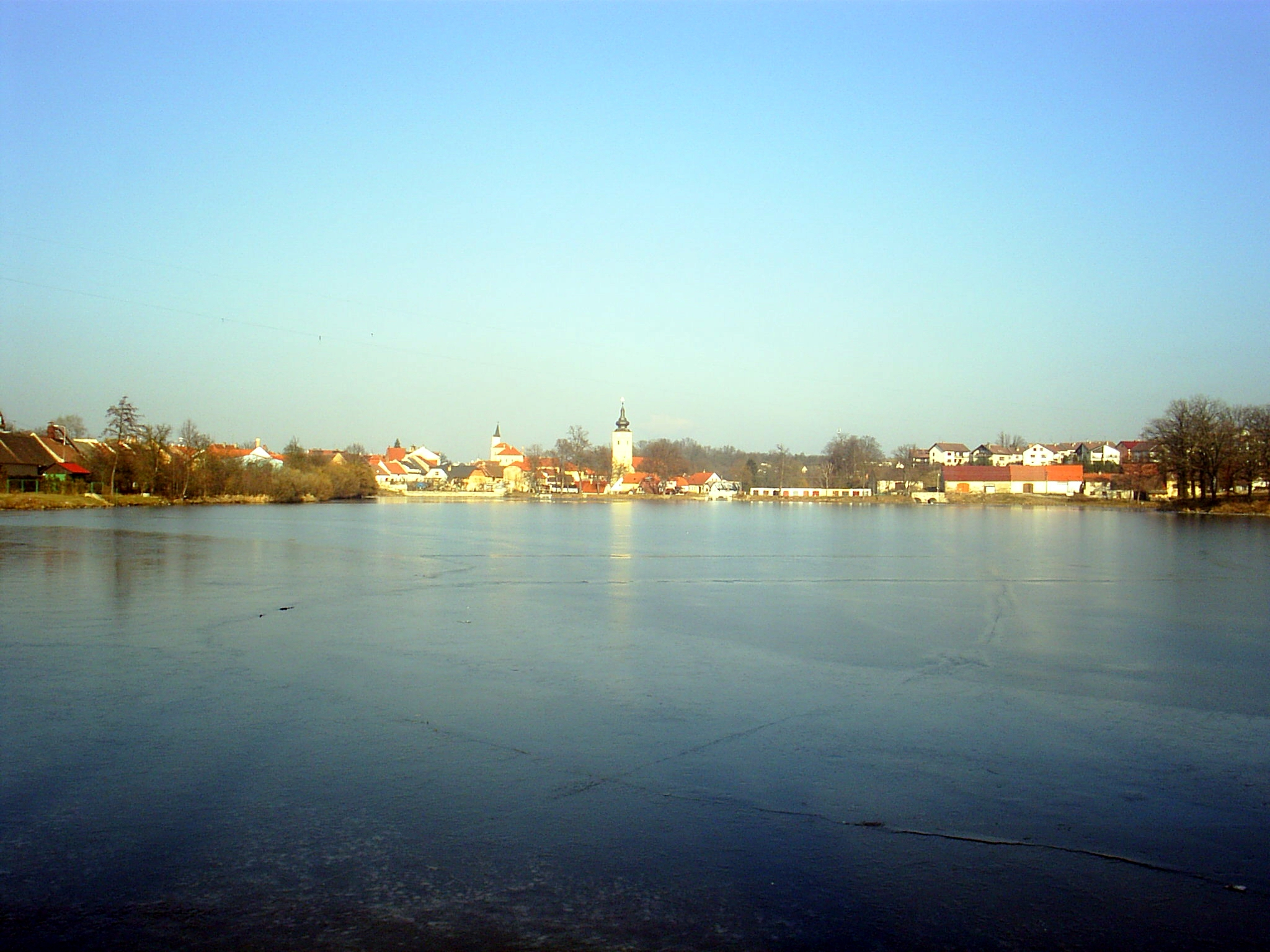
View of Netolice over Mnich pond

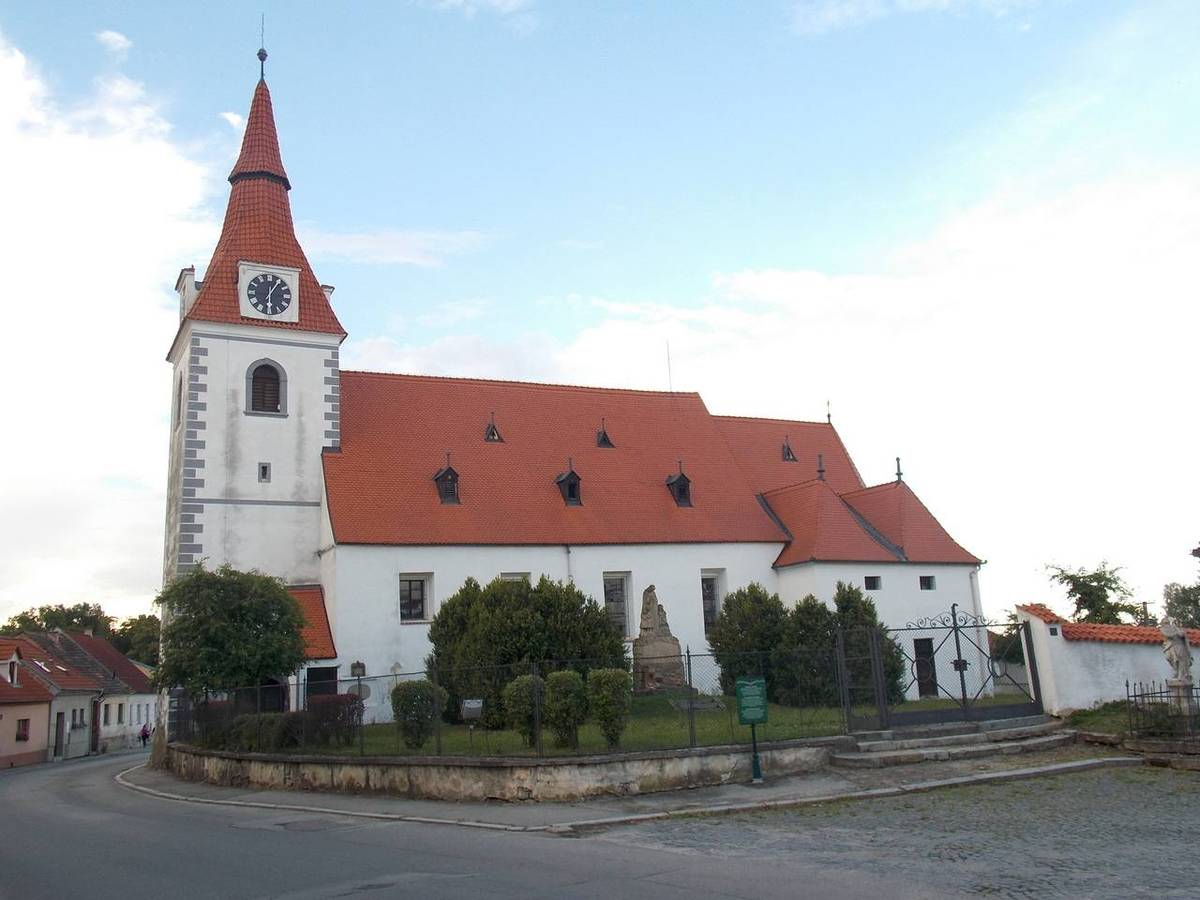
Church of Saint Wenceslaus

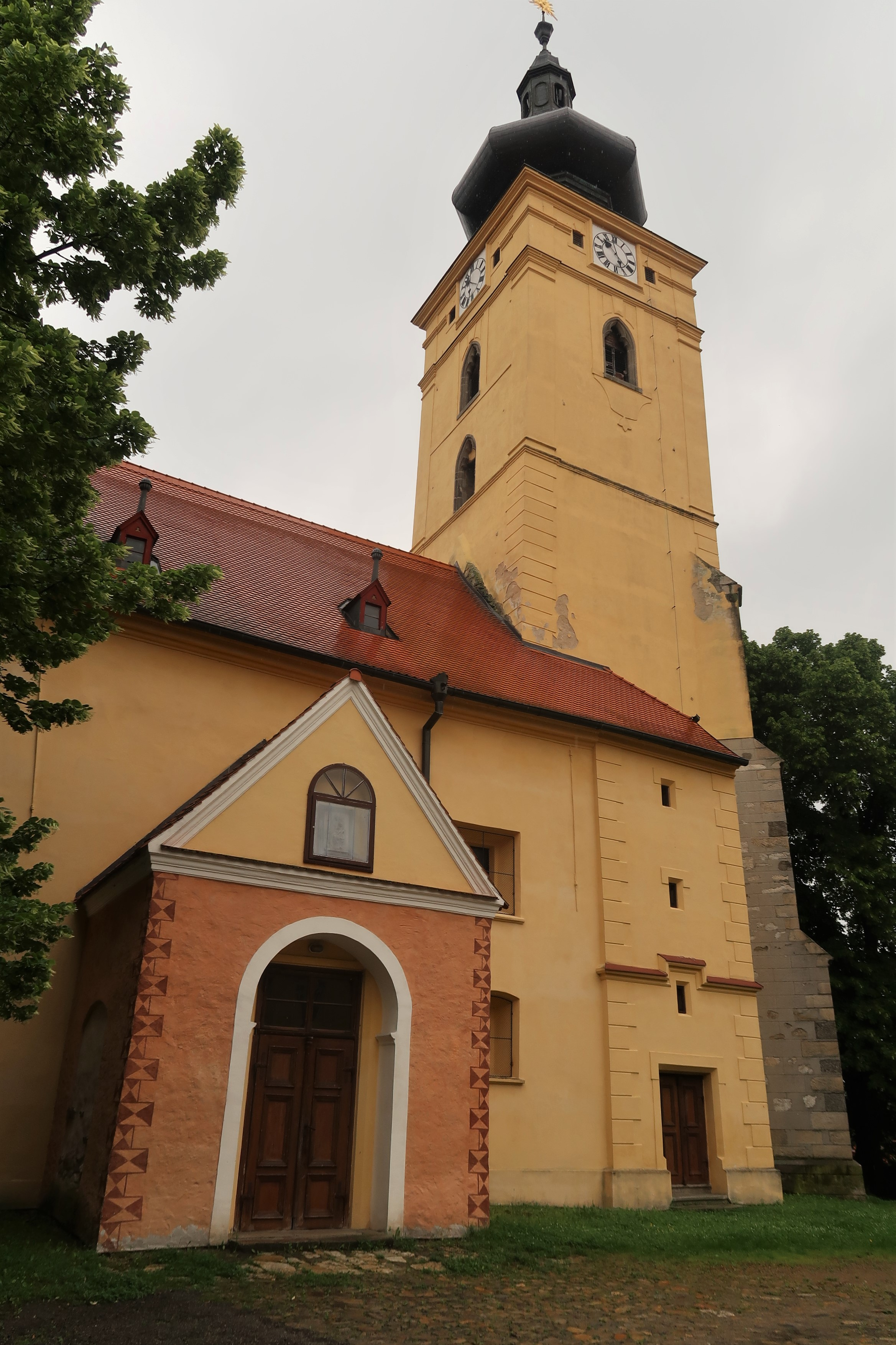
Church of the Assumption of the Virgin Mary

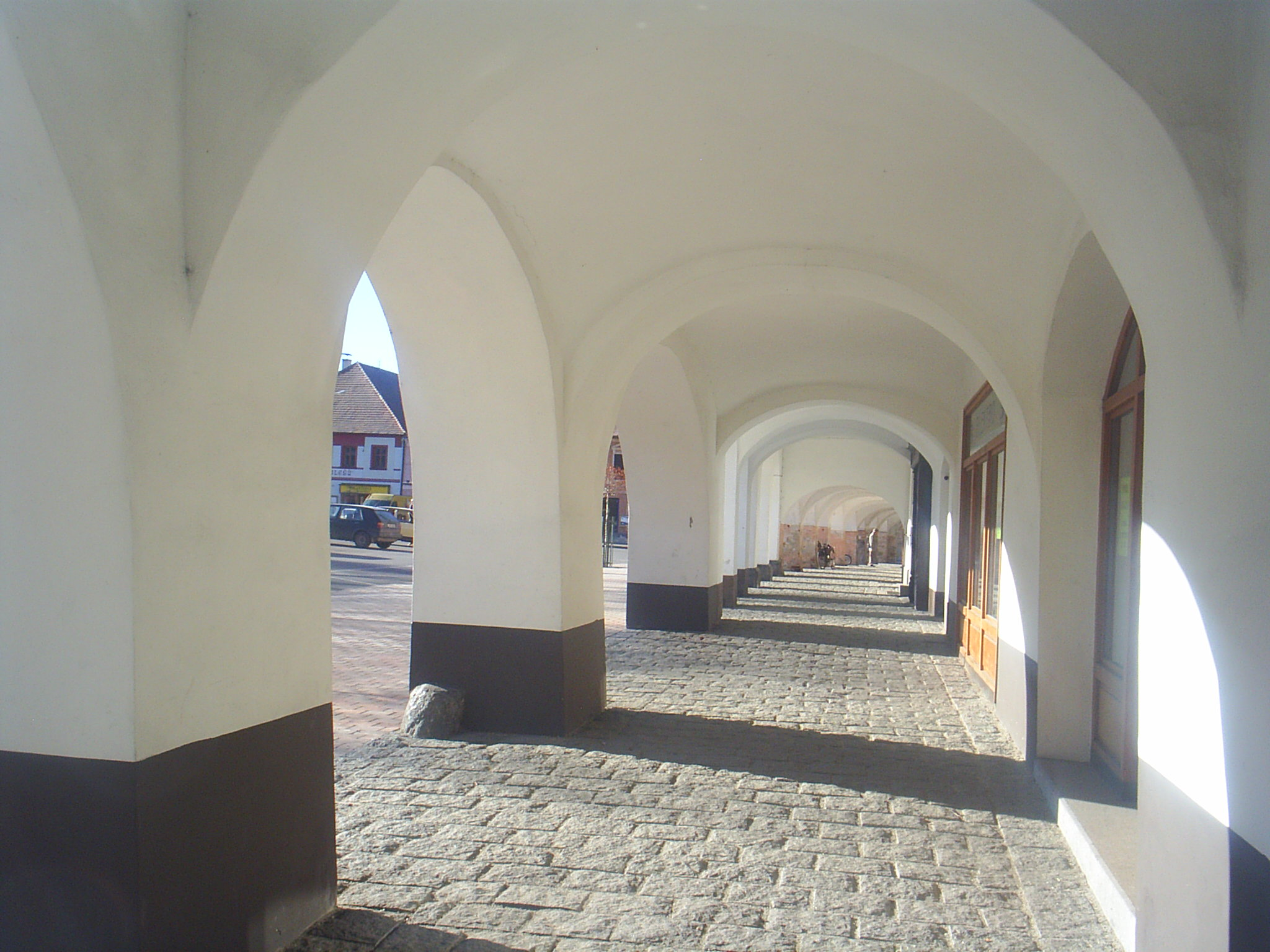
Arcade on the square

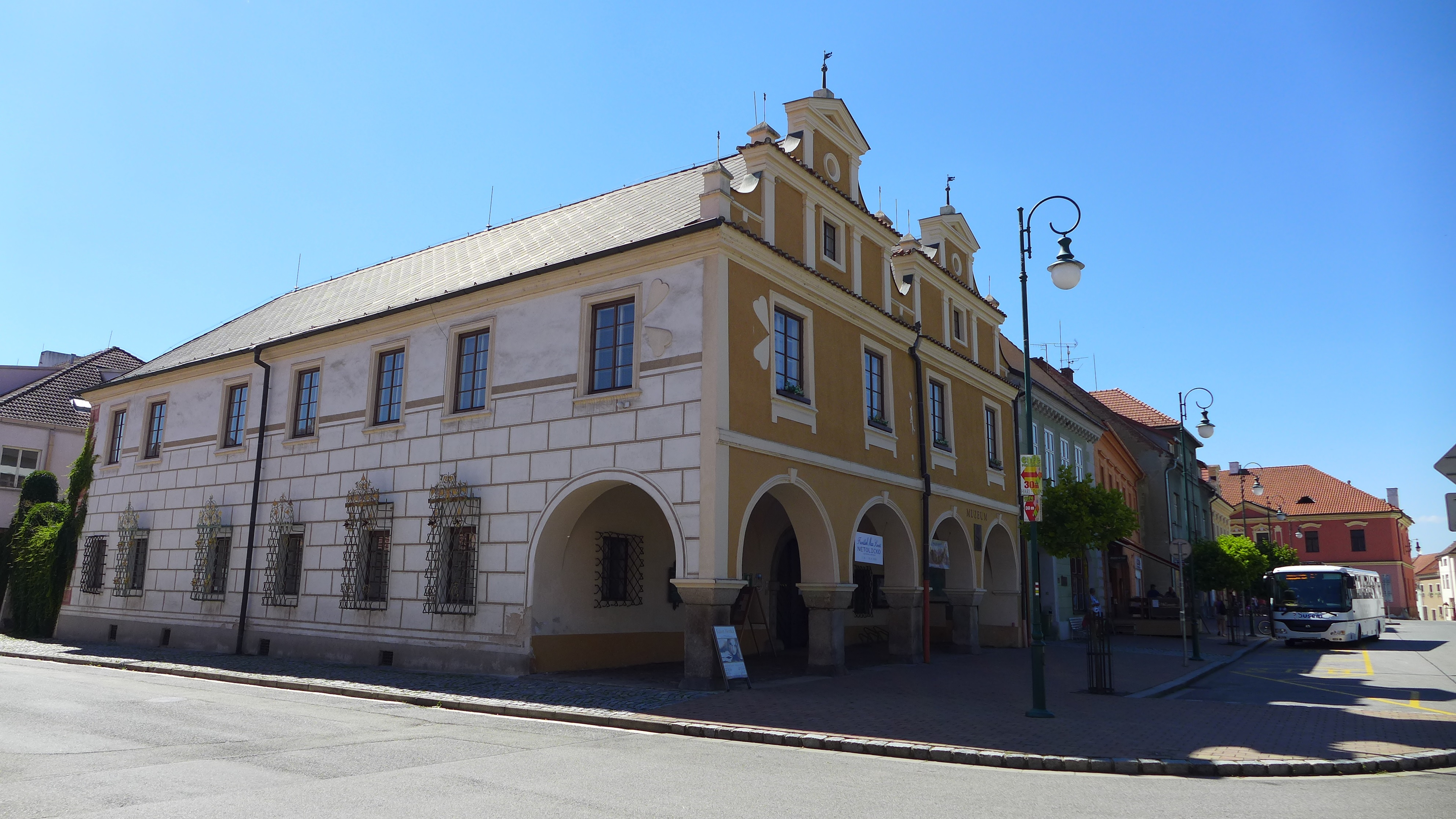
Rosenberg House on the square
