= Dobronice u Bechyně =

- Municipality
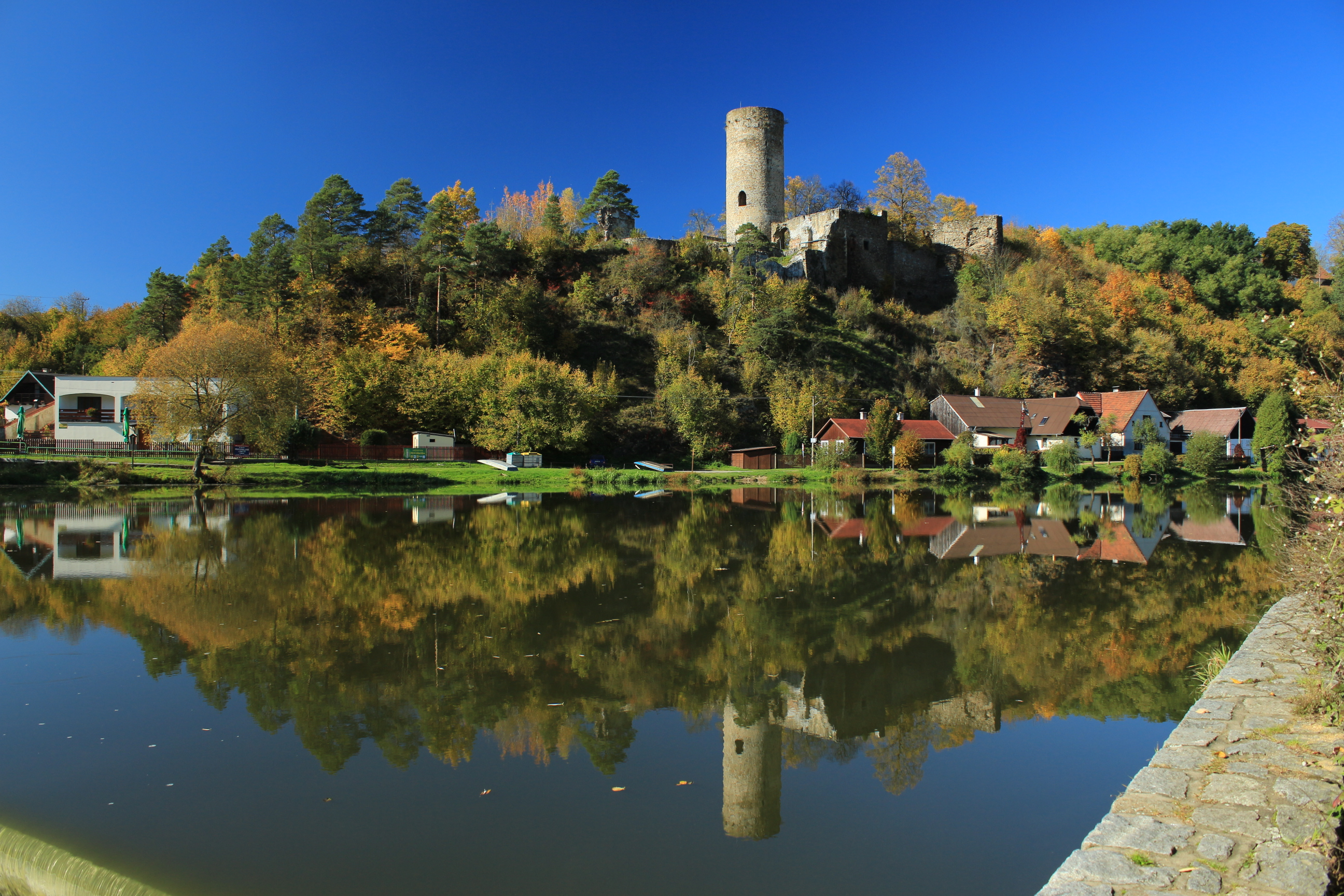
- View towards the Dobronice Castle

- Flag Coat of arms

- Location in the Czech Republic
- Coordinates: 49°20′36″N 14°29′48″E
- Country: Czech Republic
- Region: South Bohemian
- District: Tábor
- First mentioned: 1220

Area
  - Total: 8.32 km^{2} (3.21 sq mi)
- Elevation: 440 m (1,440 ft)

Population (2026-01-01)
  - Total: 123
  - Density: 14.8/km^{2} (38.3/sq mi)
- Time zone: UTC+1 (CET)
  - Summer (DST): UTC+2 (CEST)
- Postal code: 391 65
- Website: www.dobronice.cz

Dobronice u Bechyně is a municipality and village in Tábor District in the South Bohemian Region of the Czech Republic. It has about 100 inhabitants.

Dobronice u Bechyně lies approximately 14 kilometres (9 mi) south-west of Tábor, 42 km (26 mi) north of České Budějovice, and 83 km (52 mi) south of Prague.

== Demographics ==
Historical population
| Year | Pop. | ±% |
|---|---|---|
| 1869 | 587 | — |
| 1880 | 561 | −4.4% |
| 1890 | 534 | −4.8% |
| 1900 | 539 | +0.9% |
| 1910 | 517 | −4.1% |
| 1921 | 545 | +5.4% |
| 1930 | 481 | −11.7% |
| 1950 | 313 | −34.9% |
| 1961 | 298 | −4.8% |
| 1970 | 220 | −26.2% |
| 1980 | 146 | −33.6% |
| 1991 | 118 | −19.2% |
| 2001 | 102 | −13.6% |
| 2011 | 123 | +20.6% |
| 2021 | 105 | −14.6% |
Source: Censuses
