= Budíškovice =

- Municipality
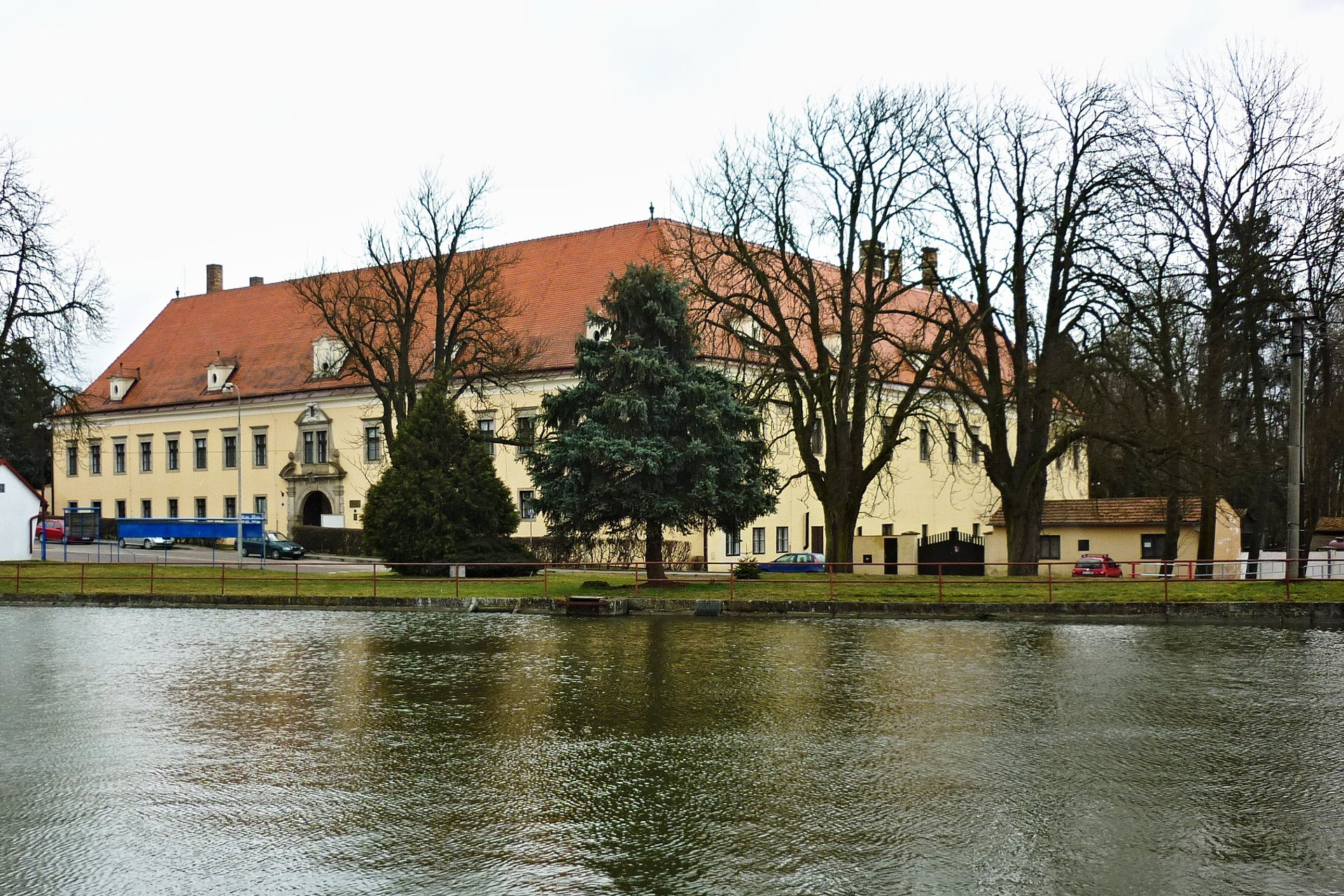
- Budíškovice Castle

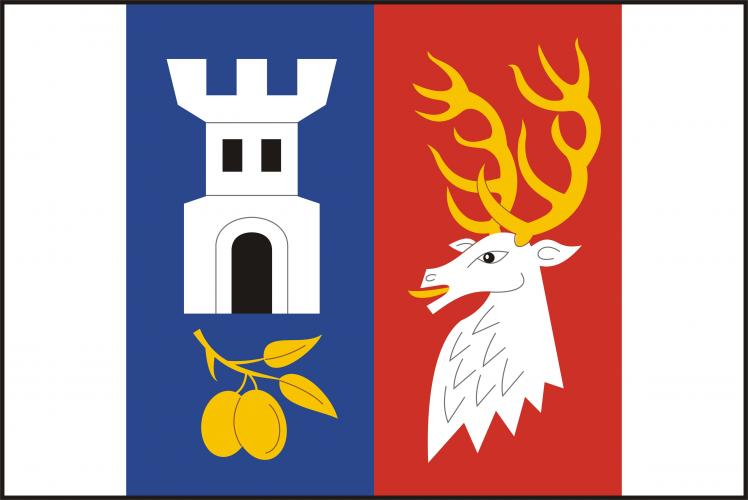
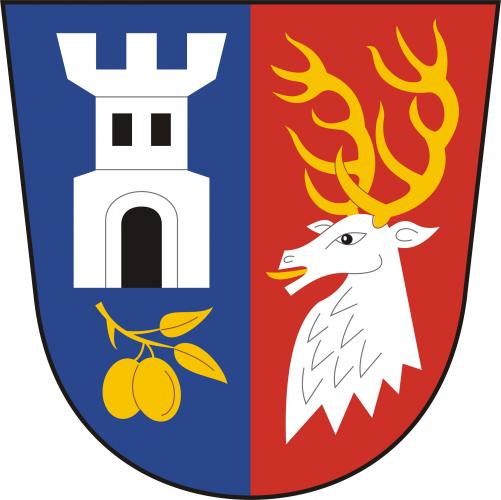
- Flag Coat of arms

- Location in the Czech Republic
- Coordinates: 49°4′35″N 15°31′51″E
- Country: Czech Republic
- Region: South Bohemian
- District: Jindřichův Hradec
- First mentioned: 1353

Area
  - Total: 23.02 km^{2} (8.89 sq mi)
- Elevation: 512 m (1,680 ft)

Population (2026-01-01)
  - Total: 735
  - Density: 31.9/km^{2} (82.7/sq mi)
- Time zone: UTC+1 (CET)
  - Summer (DST): UTC+2 (CEST)
- Postal codes: 378 91, 380 01
- Website: www.budiskovice.cz

Budíškovice (German: Budischkowitz) is a municipality and village in Jindřichův Hradec District in the South Bohemian Region of the Czech Republic. It has about 700 inhabitants.

== Administrative division ==
Budíškovice consists of four municipal parts (in brackets population according to the 2021 census):

- Budíškovice (408)
- Manešovice (36)
- Ostojkovice (150)
- Vesce (86)

Ostojkovice forms an exclave of the municipal territory.

== Demographics ==
Historical population
Year	Pop.	±%
1869	1,085	—
1880	1,070	−1.4%
1890	1,043	−2.5%
1900	1,079	+3.5%
1910	1,052	−2.5%
1921	1,031	−2.0%
1930	1,013	−1.7%
1950	936	−7.6%
1961	1,137	+21.5%
1970	1,022	−10.1%
1980	942	−7.8%
1991	834	−11.5%
2001	814	−2.4%
2011	813	−0.1%
2021	680	−16.4%
Source: Censuses
