= Škvořetice =

- Municipality
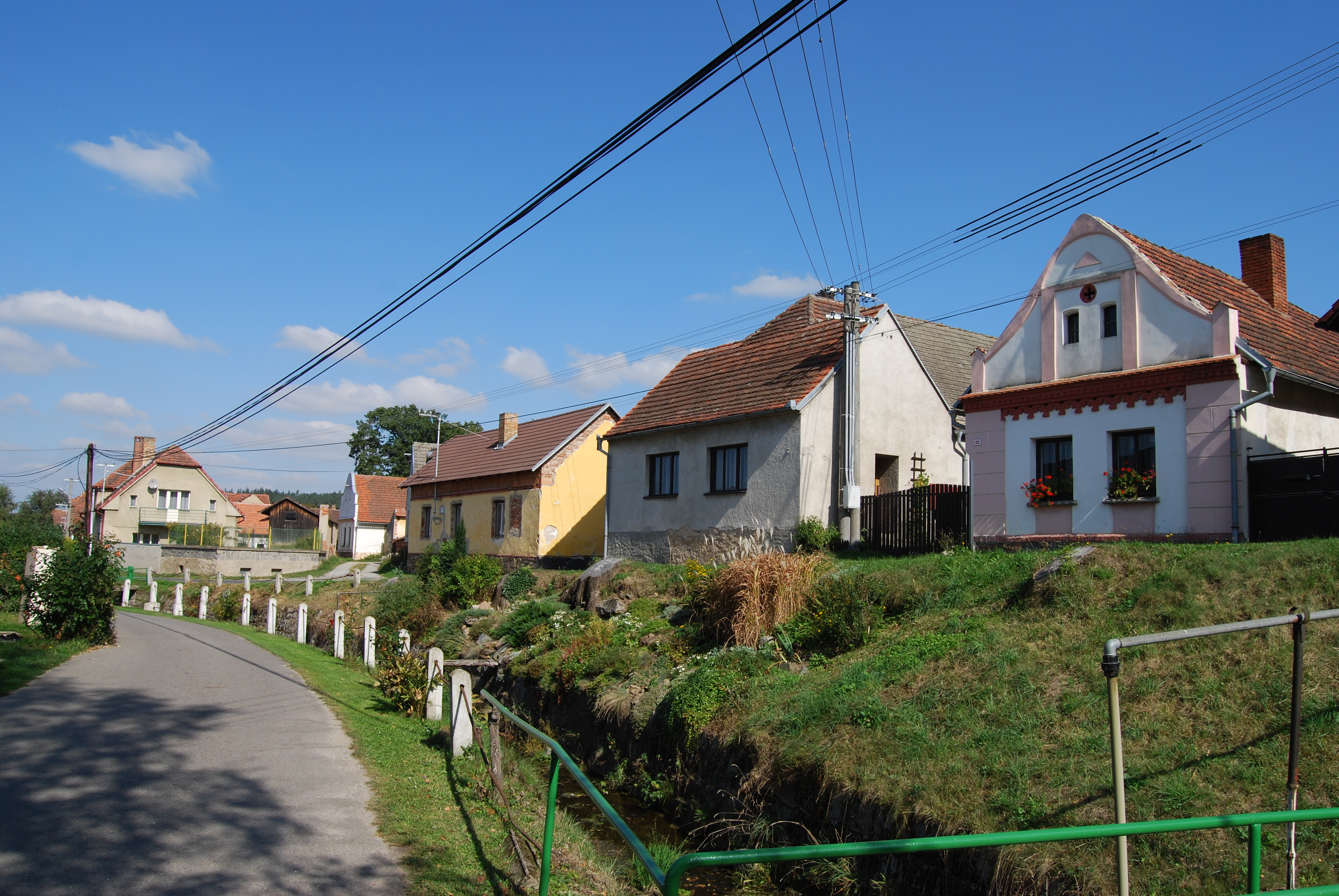
- Houses by the Škvořetice Stream

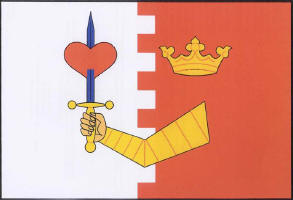
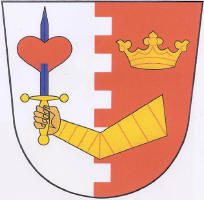
- Flag Coat of arms

- Location in the Czech Republic
- Coordinates: 49°24′9″N 13°56′57″E
- Country: Czech Republic
- Region: South Bohemian
- District: Strakonice
- First mentioned: 1299

Area
  - Total: 9.57 km^{2} (3.69 sq mi)
- Elevation: 458 m (1,503 ft)

Population (2026-01-01)
  - Total: 323
  - Density: 33.8/km^{2} (87.4/sq mi)
- Time zone: UTC+1 (CET)
  - Summer (DST): UTC+2 (CEST)
- Postal code: 388 01
- Website: www.obecskvoretice.cz

Škvořetice is a municipality and village in Strakonice District in the South Bohemian Region of the Czech Republic. It has about 300 inhabitants.

Škvořetice lies approximately 17 kilometres (11 mi) north of Strakonice, 61 km (38 mi) north-west of České Budějovice, and 84 km (52 mi) south-west of Prague.

== Administrative division ==
Škvořetice consists of two municipal parts (in brackets population according to the 2021 census):

- Škvořetice (250)
- Pacelice (59)

== Demographics ==
Historical population
Year	Pop.	±%
1869	792	—
1880	823	+3.9%
1890	741	−10.0%
1900	684	−7.7%
1910	635	−7.2%
1921	659	+3.8%
1930	624	−5.3%
1950	507	−18.8%
1961	484	−4.5%
1970	422	−12.8%
1980	392	−7.1%
1991	377	−3.8%
2001	311	−17.5%
2011	324	+4.2%
2021	309	−4.6%
Source: Censuses
