= Kratochvíle Castle =

Kratochvíle
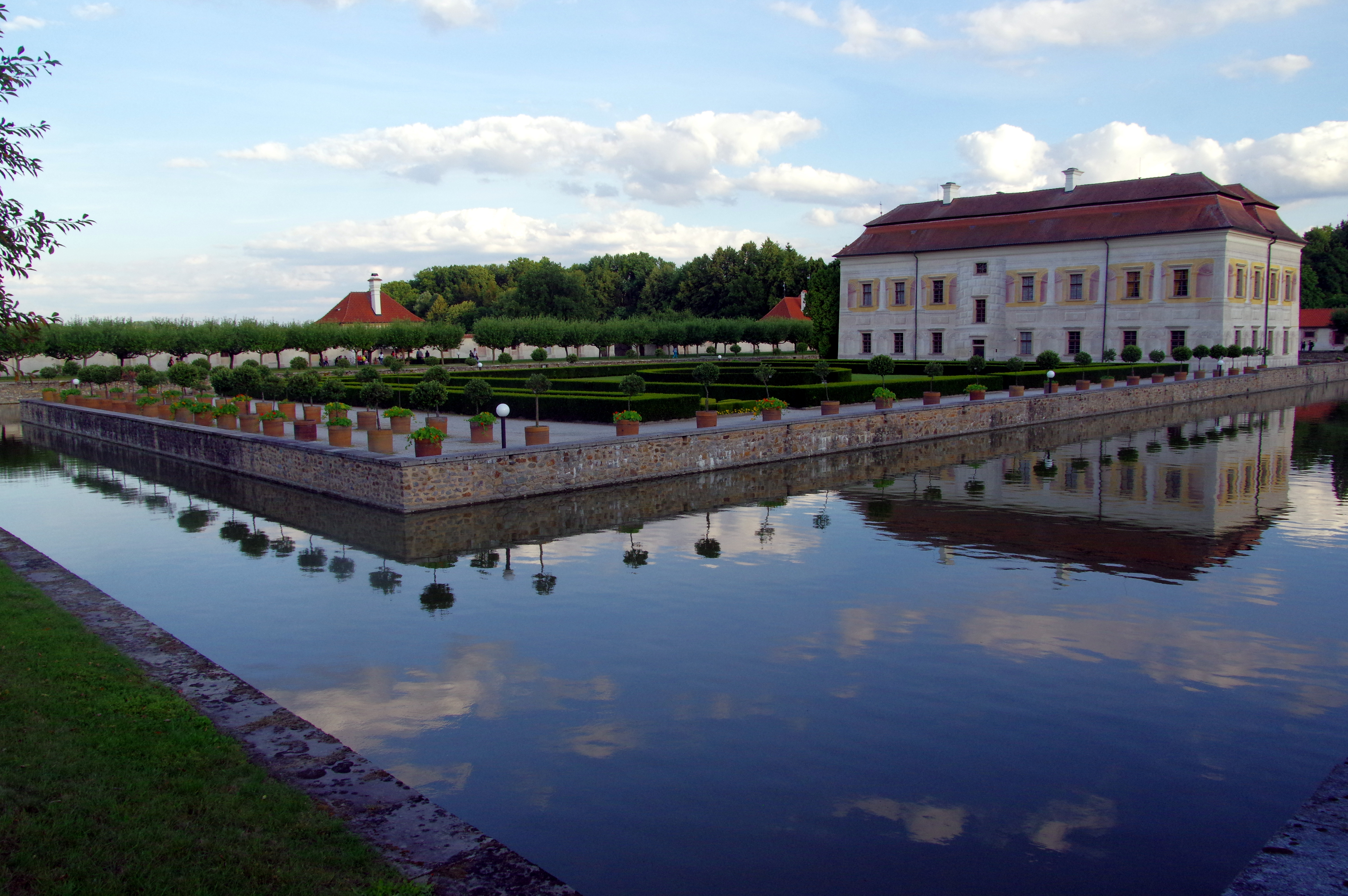
- The castle with its castle park

- Location within Czech Republic

General information
- Type: Manor house
- Architectural style: Renaissance
- Location: Netolice, South Bohemian Region, Czech Republic
- Coordinates: 49°02.57′N 14°11.47′E

Website
- www.zamek-kratochvile.cz/en

Kratochvíle Castle is a Renaissance castle in Petrův Dvůr in the South Bohemian Region of the Czech Republic. It is a picturesque manorial residence surrounded by a small castle park.

== History ==
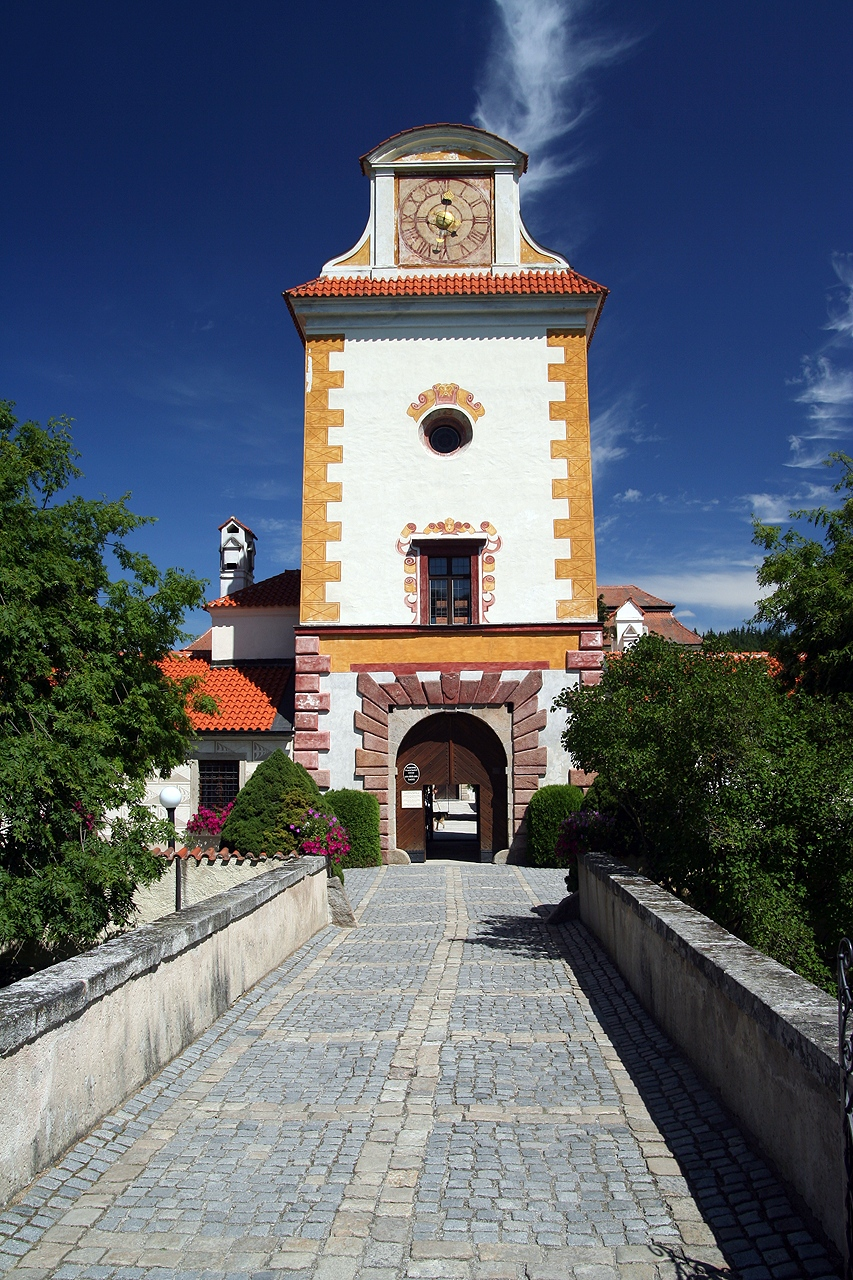
Entrance gate of the castle

The medieval moated fortified stronghold of 1569 was turned into a hunting lodge between 1583 and 1589 by William of Rosenberg. It was designed in the style of the Roman country villa and named Kratochvíle. The architect was Baldassare Maggi from Arogno, Ticino, Switzerland. The whole complex with an entrance wing, outline of fortifications, moat and drawbridge was built in the form of a slightly elongated rectangle, and the castle was built on piles of marshy ground.

The small Chapel of Our Lady in the southwest corner of the castle gardens was built between 1584 and 1589. The glory days of the castle ended when Peter Vok of Rosenberg had to sell it to Emperor Rudolf II in 1601 because of debts. The emperor gave the castle to the Eggenberg family and in 1719 it was acquired by the Schwarzenberg family. The international arrangement of the building to the layout of an Italian villa, with the open loggia on the ground floor being replaced here by a large vaulted entrance hall, which corresponded to the area of the Great Hall on the first floor, is linked to the ground floor by a staircase. On both floors rooms of varying sizes are liked to these chambers.

On the ground floor they were partly of a functional nature and on the first floor they included the private apartments of the lord and lady, and the most grandiose room of the castle the Great Gold Hall where visitors were received and which is richly decorated, as are most of the other rooms, with stucco reliefs and murals based on classical mythology by Antonio Melana. During extensive restoration experts discovered five paintings depicting scenes from the life of Samson, in the adjoining Small Gold Hall.

In the 19th century, the castle was converted into apartments for the Schwarzenberg family and in 1950 the restoration work was carried out. Kratochvíle houses an exhibition of Czech puppet and animated films with original works by notable Czech producers Jiří Trnka, Hermína Týrlová and Karel Zeman.
