= Osek (Písek District) =

- Municipality
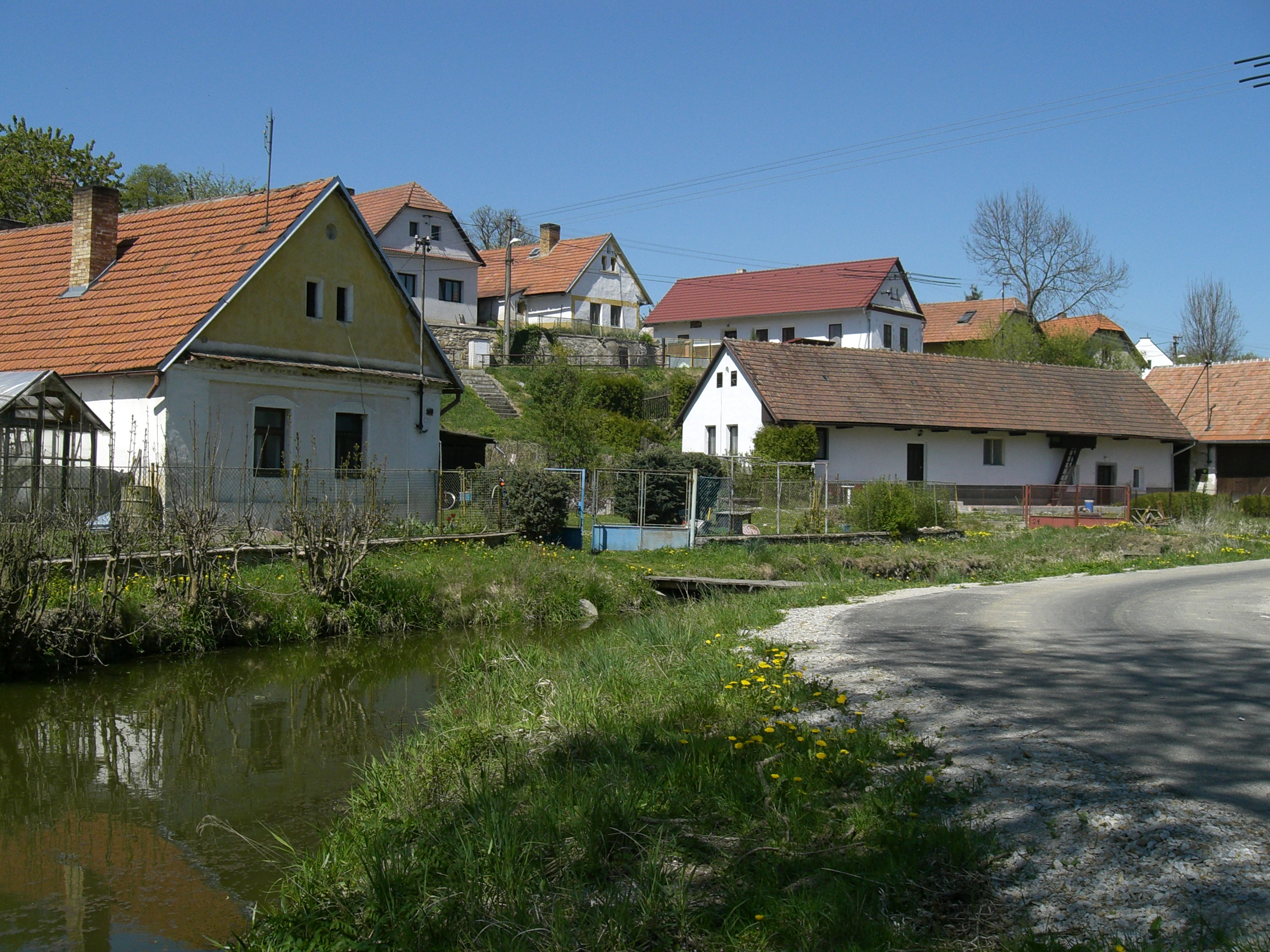
- Side street

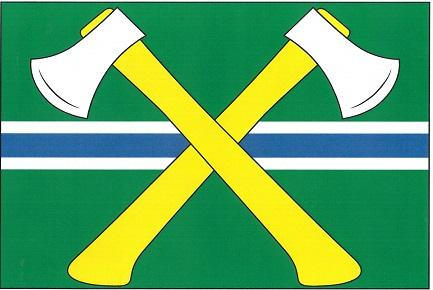
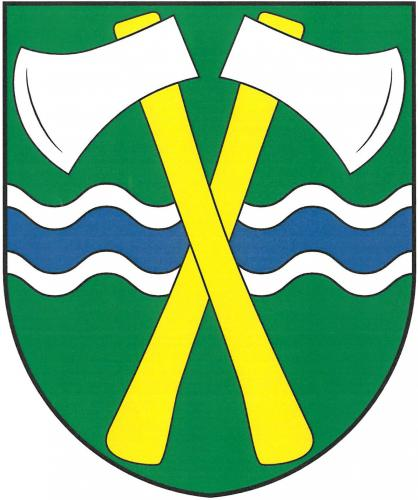
- Flag Coat of arms

- Location in the Czech Republic
- Coordinates: 49°26′36″N 14°18′0″E
- Country: Czech Republic
- Region: South Bohemian
- District: Písek
- First mentioned: 1469

Area
  - Total: 5.29 km^{2} (2.04 sq mi)
- Elevation: 451 m (1,480 ft)

Population (2026-01-01)
  - Total: 153
  - Density: 28.9/km^{2} (74.9/sq mi)
- Time zone: UTC+1 (CET)
  - Summer (DST): UTC+2 (CEST)
- Postal code: 399 01
- Website: osek.eu

Osek (German: Wosek) is a municipality and village in Písek District in the South Bohemian Region of the Czech Republic. It has about 200 inhabitants.

Osek lies approximately 20 kilometres (12 mi) north-east of Písek, 54 km (34 mi) north of České Budějovice, and 72 km (45 mi) south of Prague.

== Etymology ==
Osek is a common Czech toponym. The word osek denotes a cut trunk, but it also could mean a cut forest.

== Demographics ==
Historical population
Year	Pop.	±%
1869	415	—
1880	380	−8.4%
1890	356	−6.3%
1900	366	+2.8%
1910	344	−6.0%
1921	363	+5.5%
1930	324	−10.7%
1950	261	−19.4%
1961	235	−10.0%
1970	197	−16.2%
1980	172	−12.7%
1991	136	−20.9%
2001	132	−2.9%
2011	135	+2.3%
2021	131	−3.0%
Source: Censuses
