= Bratronice (Strakonice District) =

- Municipality
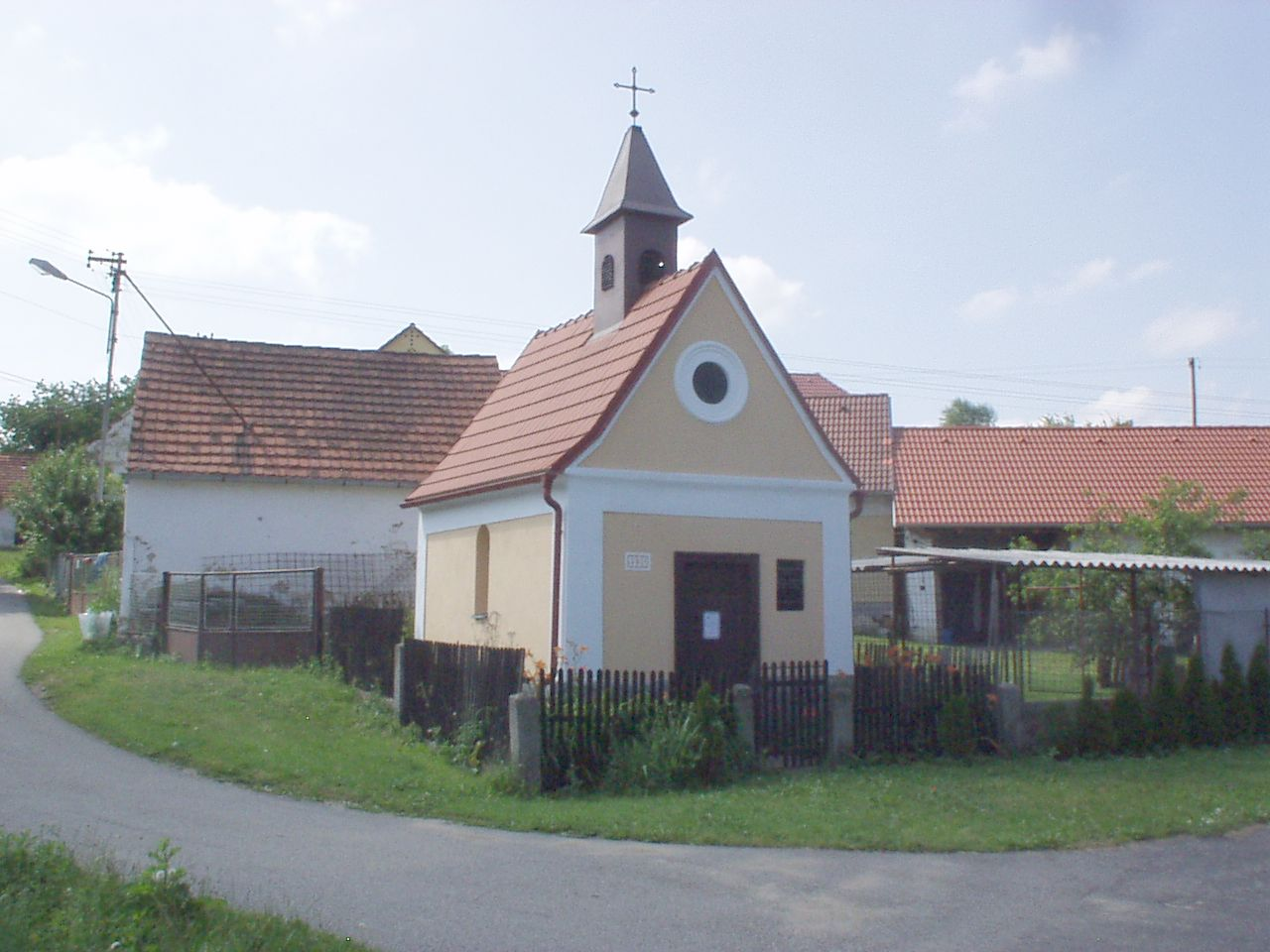
- Chapel in the centre of Bratronice

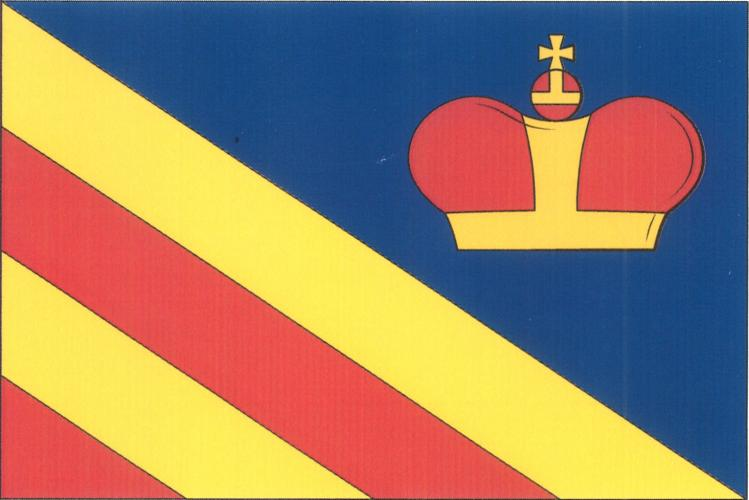
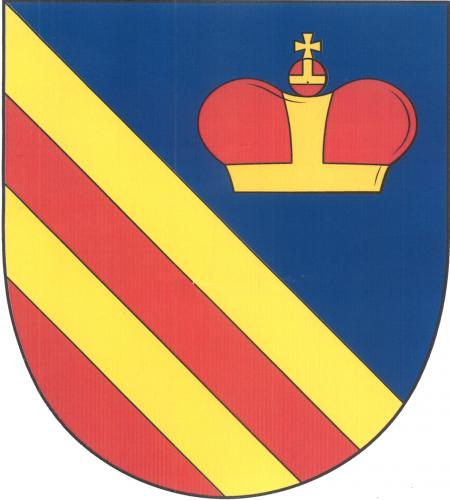
- Flag Coat of arms

- Location in the Czech Republic
- Coordinates: 49°21′55″N 13°50′33″E
- Country: Czech Republic
- Region: South Bohemian
- District: Strakonice
- First mentioned: 1227

Area
  - Total: 4.70 km^{2} (1.81 sq mi)
- Elevation: 545 m (1,788 ft)

Population (2026-01-01)
  - Total: 77
  - Density: 16/km^{2} (42/sq mi)
- Time zone: UTC+1 (CET)
  - Summer (DST): UTC+2 (CEST)
- Postal code: 388 01
- Website: www.ou-bratronice.cz

Bratronice is a municipality and village in Strakonice District in the South Bohemian Region of the Czech Republic. It has about 80 inhabitants.

Bratronice lies approximately 13 kilometres (8 mi) north of Strakonice, 64 km (40 mi) north-west of České Budějovice, and 90 km (56 mi) south-west of Prague.

== Administrative division ==
Bratronice consists of two municipal parts (in brackets population according to the 2021 census):

- Bratronice (58)
- Katovsko (5)

== Demographics ==
Historical population
Year	Pop.	±%
1869	417	—
1880	387	−7.2%
1890	338	−12.7%
1900	293	−13.3%
1910	290	−1.0%
1921	290	+0.0%
1930	247	−14.8%
1950	176	−28.7%
1961	185	+5.1%
1970	145	−21.6%
1980	97	−33.1%
1991	67	−30.9%
2001	53	−20.9%
2011	51	−3.8%
2021	63	+23.5%
Source: Censuses
