= Němčice (Strakonice District) =

- Municipality
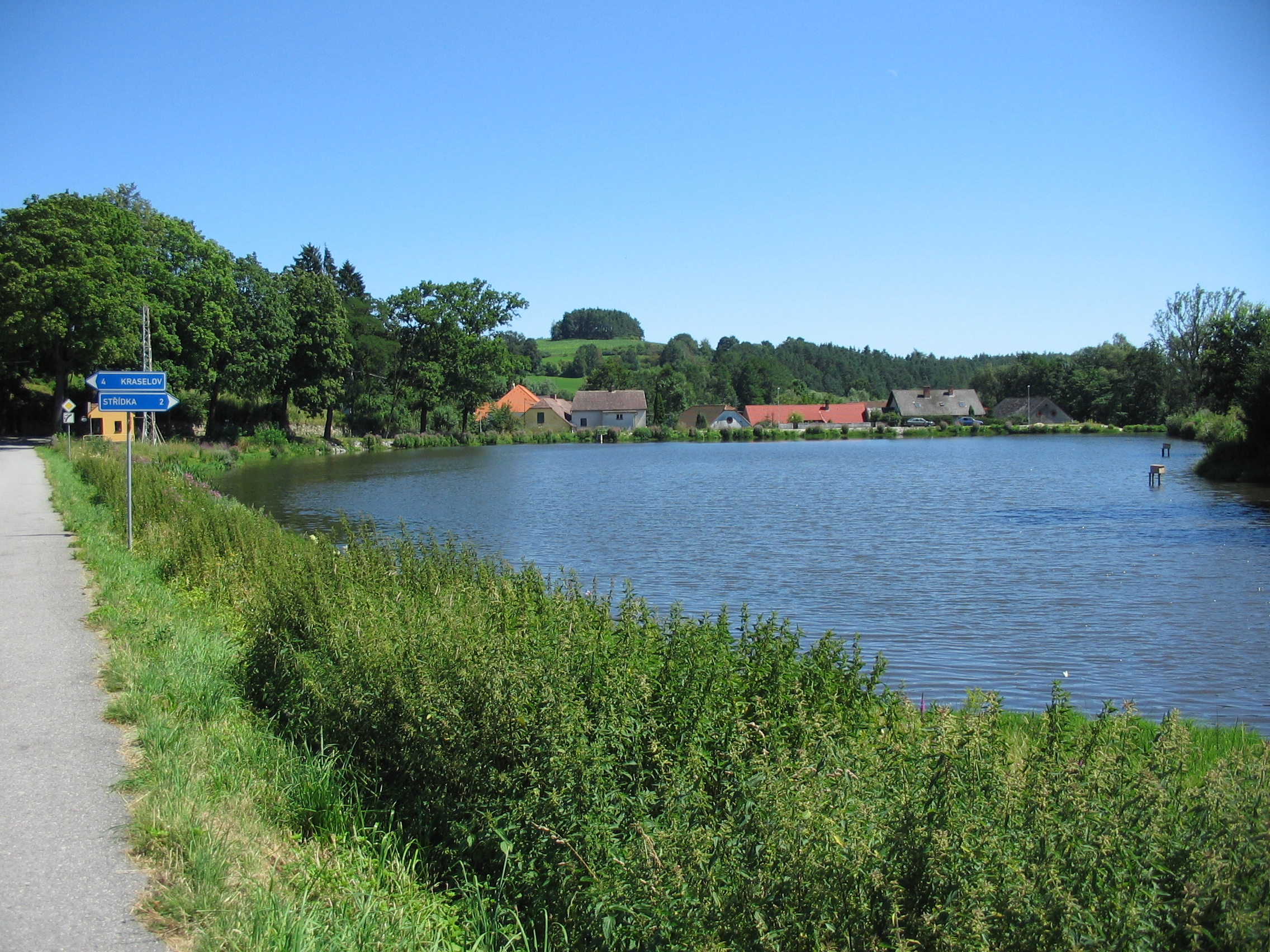
- Fishpond in the centre of Němčice

- Location in the Czech Republic
- Coordinates: 49°11′34″N 13°48′0″E
- Country: Czech Republic
- Region: South Bohemian
- District: Strakonice
- First mentioned: 1227

Area
  - Total: 2.75 km^{2} (1.06 sq mi)
- Elevation: 541 m (1,775 ft)

Population (2026-01-01)
  - Total: 102
  - Density: 37.1/km^{2} (96.1/sq mi)
- Time zone: UTC+1 (CET)
  - Summer (DST): UTC+2 (CEST)
- Postal code: 387 19
- Website: www.nemciceuvolyne.cz

Němčice is a municipality and village in Strakonice District in the South Bohemian Region of the Czech Republic. It has about 100 inhabitants.

Němčice lies approximately 11 kilometres (7 mi) south-west of Strakonice, 56 km (35 mi) north-west of České Budějovice, and 109 km (68 mi) south-west of Prague.

== Demographics ==
Historical population
Year	Pop.	±%
1869	301	—
1880	323	+7.3%
1890	286	−11.5%
1900	298	+4.2%
1910	329	+10.4%
1921	326	−0.9%
1930	257	−21.2%
1950	189	−26.5%
1961	224	+18.5%
1970	186	−17.0%
1980	149	−19.9%
1991	130	−12.8%
2001	106	−18.5%
2011	130	+22.6%
2021	105	−19.2%
Source: Censuses
